= Baldur's Gate III: The Black Hound =

Cancelled video game

- Developer: Black Isle Studios
- Publisher: Interplay Entertainment
- Designers: Josh Sawyer; Damien Foletto
- Series: Baldur's Gate
- Platform: Microsoft Windows
- Release: Cancelled
- Genre: Role-playing
- Mode: Single-player

Baldur's Gate III: The Black Hound is a cancelled role-playing video game developed by Black Isle Studios and intended to be published by Interplay Entertainment for Microsoft Windows. Announced in 2002 under the codenames FR6 and Project Jefferson, it was planned to be the third main entry in the Baldur's Gate series, utilizing the Dungeons & Dragons 3rd Edition ruleset. The game was set to use the developer's proprietary 3D graphics engine rather than the Infinity Engine used for the studio's previous games.

The Black Hound was cancelled in 2003 when Interplay lost the rights to develop further Dungeons & Dragons games for the PC platform. Development at Black Isle Studios moved onto a sequel to the Fallout series codenamed Van Buren, which was itself cancelled in late 2003. Black Isle Studios would develop a further spin-off to the series, Baldur's Gate: Dark Alliance II, before being shut down by Interplay on 8 December 2003.

In 2019, Larian Studios announced an unrelated Baldur's Gate 3. It was released in 2023 to critical acclaim.

== Gameplay ==
=== Game dynamics ===
Several interviews shed light on gameplay components, with the most prominently being conducted with Winterwind Productions. It would have been built on the same fundamentals as the previous Baldur's Gate games updated to fit the Dungeons & Dragons 3rd Edition ruleset, meaning it would have used pausable realtime gameplay. Damien Foletto, a developer on the game, hoped to use elements from other games such as The Temple of Elemental Evil. The game was not to be turn-based because it would have had a significant production and marketing cost, requiring a wider audience base to be profitable. The developers intended to draw deeply from a wide variety of D&D source books to offer a diverse selection of weapons. Not all of the weapons were going to be available, but most of them would have been and the player would have been able to do "crazy" things with any weapon. As in Fallout 2, no single weapon would have been better than other weapons, and each weapon would have had its own traits.

==== Progression ====
Originally, players would have only been able to advance up to level 5. This was later changed to level 8. This was for two reasons: for the player to be able to level up to higher levels in the sequels and for the player to use more strategy. The game was originally planned to have players focus less on leveling up and more on using their brains to solve problems presented within the computer game. While there would have been many D&D character classes and races to choose from, the low level cap would necessitate the exclusion of prestige classes.

=== Karma ===
The game was said to be truly non-linear, where the player has freedom to visit any location and perform any action they wanted, keeping in mind that there will always be repercussions for the player's actions in the game. Failed/incomplete quests would have had consequences as the game progressed. Unlike previous games, the player was able to switch between alignments depending on the actions in the game. This would have also required the player character to make difficult decisions which could affect his reputation with one group in order to maintain his reputation with another.

=== Party ===
CNPCs would only join a player's party if they agreed with the player's actions. Acting contrary to the intentions and philosophies of CNPCs could result in them leaving the party, attacking the player character, or expressing their discontent in dialogue. Player characters possessing a high enough charisma could mitigate the risk of defection. Just like the original Baldur's Gate, the player could switch freely between their character and CNPCs in their party. Continuing to act against the will of CNPCs could result in the player losing the ability to play as them even if they remained within the party as a follower. Conversations would always be conducted from the perspective of the player character, but CNPCs could interject in conversation depending on applicable skills, charisma scores, and personalities. Properly leveling up the charisma levels of CNPCs could also reduce the risk of potentially violent conflict within the party.

Player character belonging to the wizard and warlock classes would have access to familiars and animal companions. It's still not known whether familiars and animal companions would be handled as traditional CNPCs or with a new set of mechanics.

=== Reputation ===
There would have been several types of reputations in The Black Hound: Regional Reputation, Factional Reputation, Fame/Infamy, and Epithets. The first three all have positive and negative scales. Some characters may only care about positive reputation in an area, others might only care about negative reputation in an organization, and others might try to balance a number of reputations when they speak to the player. Regional Reputation is a positive/negative counter that depends on the actions the character performs in a specific region. Not only will Factional Reputation affect dealings with certain organizations, it will also affect your dealings with the allies and enemies of those organizations. Fame and Infamy would have been awarded to the player character depending on their actions. Their reputation would be displayed in epithets.

== Plot ==
=== Setting ===
The game was set to take place in the fictional Forgotten Realms continent of Faerûn. It would have been set in the Dalelands and allowed players to travel mostly in the area of Archendale. Players would have also been able to travel to key areas in Archendale such as the White Ford, the Church of Lathander and bases of the Red Wizards of Thay. Other areas in the Dalelands featured would have been Battledale, Deepingdale as well as an area of North Sembia.

=== Characters ===
None of the characters from the previous Baldur's Gate games would have returned; the cast and story would have been completely original, although characters from the Icewind Dale series would have returned. The reason for this is Icewind Dale was released after Interplay lost the initial D&D license. An original NPC would have been Stellaga Brightstar, a priestess in the Church of Lathander. The game would have revolved around the hunt for May Farrow, an evil cleric who killed a Black Hound. The Black Hound was the representation of the selfish acts of the game's main antagonist and would appear to the player through circumstance and remind him of his actions throughout the game.

The main faction in the game would have been the Archenriders, the first faction encountered by the player; the Church of Lathander would have been a faction at the same importance. The Red Wizards of Thay, the Sembian Silver Ravens, the Malarite People of Black Blood, and the Elves of Deepingdale would have been other major factions in the game that the player would have been allowed to side with. The characters from Icewind Dale that would have appeared would have been the gnome Maralie Fiddlebender and the druid Iselore, who would have appeared in a cameo. The Harpers and the Zhentarim would have also appeared. The Zhentarim would have been seen for part of the game as the Black Network.

=== Story ===
May Farrow and her gang of raiders have spent weeks tracking down the black hound, the essence of May's guilt for unleashing a great evil. The player character is resting by the firelight in an old barn to hide from the storm outside when a black hound arrives and after being shot twice by an arrow, it cries one last time before it dies on the player lap. May accuses the player character (PC) of being in league with the dog (meaning she thinks the player character is another essence of her guilt) and almost kills the player before the Riders of Archendale save the PC. They question the PC and take them to the magistrate, who question the PC further and inform the PC not to leave the areas of North Sembia, Archendale, Battledale and Deepingdale. Whenever the player then approaches somebody with great guilt, the black hound appears to him and eventually the player's actions make the player the essence of guilt throughout the four areas mentioned above. As the player unravels more secrets, he learns that he can't kill guilt, thus he cannot kill the black hound or what he has become (the player can physically die, but people won't forget about what the player did). Eventually, he learns the tale of a widowed farmer's wife, taking great guilt in her husband's death as for some reason she believes it is her fault, she tries to resurrect him. She succeeds but finds him to be an abomination and cannot stop him, despite him being very weak at the time. Through the course of the game, the farmer is growing stronger and stronger off the guilt absorbed by the black hound through the player. The player learns of this wife being May Farrow, who believes killing the hound would be a way to stop the farmer, the hound however latched its soul onto the player and uses him as a tunnel to channel guilt to the farmer and as a guide to the world.

The game would not have been a sequel to Baldur's Gate II in terms of story but rather gameplay, however, it did continue part of story of Icewind Dale II through joinable NPC's, specifically Maralie Fiddlebender, who would have been an adult in the story. There was a hound featured in the storybook of Icewind Dale II of which Maralie narrated, according to the developers, the game would have revolved around this hound. The game was also revealed to have a connection to another one of Black Isle Studios games, Project Jackson. Project Jackson was then revealed to be Baldur's Gate: Dark Alliance II. This connection was unknown and as of current, there is only one connection known: a Forgotten Realms setting. It is possible that there could be a story connection due to both the Harpers and the Zhentarim being in the game, but this was never revealed by any developer on the project. It was only stated that the projects were related once in the entire history of the project.

== Development ==
Development began on The Black Hound in 2001, concurrently with Icewind Dale: Heart of Winter, under the codenames FR6 and Project Jefferson. Interplay announced plans to develop further sequels to the Baldur's Gate franchise in 2002. The Black Hound was intended to be the first game in a trilogy of Baldur's Gate titles.

A new 3D engine was developed for the project to replace the Infinity Engine used in previous Black Isle Studios titles, colloquially referred to as the Jefferson Engine, which drew inspiration from the Aurora Engine developed by BioWare for use in Neverwinter Nights. Key features of the engine included static lighting, support for modular game systems that would allow designers greater flexibility in creating systems outside the constraints of the Dungeons & Dragons ruleset, and an extensive character and monster customization system that would have allowed for a large amount of character variety among enemies and non-player characters. After the game's cancellation, the Jefferson Engine would be used by Black Isle Studios to develop a sequel to the Fallout series codenamed Van Buren until the game's cancellation in late 2003.

The Black Hound was cancelled when Interplay lost the rights to develop further Dungeons & Dragons games for PC, having shifted development focus towards console-focused spinoffs such as Baldur's Gate: Dark Alliance and Fallout: Brotherhood of Steel. Black Isle Studios would develop Baldur's Gate: Dark Alliance 2 before being shut down by Interplay in 2003. Further development on the series would be halted due to legal disputes between Interplay and Dark Alliance developer Snowblind Studios over Interplay's unauthorized use of the Dark Alliance engine.

Members of the Black Isle Studios development team later went on to form Obsidian Entertainment, where they would develop Neverwinter Nights 2 and its expansions. Josh Sawyer, designer on The Black Hound and Neverwinter Nights 2, later expressed an interest in using the user-generated content tools of Neverwinter Nights 2 to develop the Black Hound concept into a content module for the game.
