= Bawls =

Caffeinated soft drink

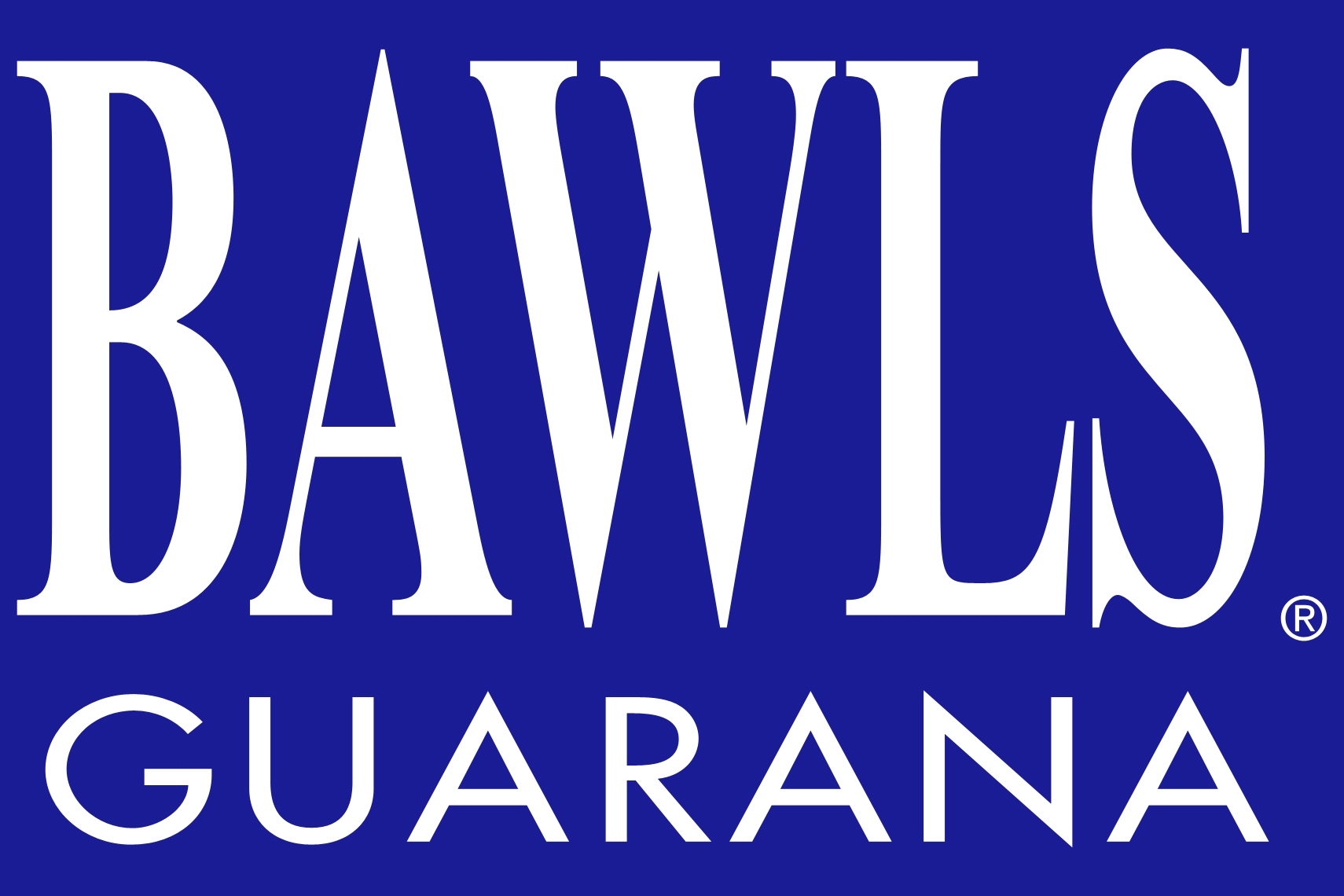
- Type: Soft drink
- Manufacturer: Solvi Acquisition
- Origin: United States
- Introduced: November 14, 1996 (29 years ago)
- Flavor: Citrus and cream soda
- Ingredients: Guarana
- Variants: Cherry; Cherry Cola; Ginger; Orange; Root Beer; Zero
- Website: www.bawls.com

Bawls (marketed as BAWLS Guarana) is a non-alcoholic, highly-caffeinated soft drink.

Created in 1996, the citrus-and-cream soda-flavored beverage leans heavily on the caffeine and natural flavor of the Amazonian guarana berry. Packaged in unique cobalt-blue bottles and cans, the drink was well received by gamers, to whom the company quickly began extensively marketing (through both sponsorships and video games themselves). The soda's name has an unclear provenance, and as of July 2023 is still sold alongside six other flavors.

== History ==
In 1994, Hobart C. Buppert III (born 1973/1974) was a student at the Cornell University School of Hotel Administration. While traveling through Vienna, he found club dancers were paying US$10 (equivalent to $21.72 in 2025) for cans of non-alcoholic, highly-caffeinated, "sludgy brew" derived from guarana beans. Himself unable to tolerate coffee, Buppert saw potential in refining the drink he saw in Europe and received permission from Cornell to develop a business plan as an independent study.

Buppert graduated from Cornell in 1995 with a degree in finance. In 1996, he took out a loan for $200,000 (equivalent to $410,567 in 2025) to launch Hobarama in Miami Beach, Florida. In South Beach on November 14, 1996, he launched his first product: Bawls Guarana, a soft drink with three times the caffeine of Coca-Cola Classic. Bawls capitalized upon trends of the mid-1990s by being highly caffeinated, derived from natural ingredients, and having a gimmicky premise. By 1998, Bawls was not only popular in the nightclubs of New York City, South Florida, and Southern California, but was spreading to grocery stores in the US and Europe. In its first year, Bawls brought in revenue of $400,000 (equivalent to $790,118 in 2025). In 2002, Hobarama moved into new Miami Beach offices at 311 Lincoln Road.

By November 2009, Hobarama was struggling, and creditors like Fifth Third Bank forced out chief executive officer (CEO) and founder, Buppert. A restructuring plan was put into place, and the company was entertaining any buyout offers. On stable footing by 2012, the company bought out competitors Crunk Energy Drink and Strut & Rut. Jon Gunnerson was the company's CEO by 2014; the company had since moved its offices to Twinsburg, Ohio.

The marketing and higher caffeine content of Monster Energy delivered the first damage to Bawls' market share in 2002 by being more-widely appealing. The company later lost even its gamer niche to brands including Mtn Dew Game Fuel, Rockstar, and G Fuel—a brand with over 111 times more social-media followers. In 2022, the drink was being produced by Solvi Acquisition, and Bon Appétit reported on both Buppert's prediction that Bawls was in its twilight, and that the drink was "nearly impossible to find in stores".

== Production ==
=== Composition ===
Buppert and an Indianapolis flavor lab engineered Bawls' flavor in a single day. The Baltimore Sun described its taste as a citrus-flavored cream soda, and the soft drink derives its caffeine from the Amazonian guarana berry.

In 2002, a twelve-US-fluid-ounce (350 ml) bottle contained 80 milligrams (1.2 gr) of caffeine and sold for about $1.00 (equivalent to $1.79 in 2025). In 2004, a ten-US-fluid-ounce (300 ml) bottle contained as much caffeine as 1.5 cups of coffee and was priced between $1–1.50 (equivalent to $1.7–2.56 in 2025).

In 2015, the 16-US-fluid-ounce (470 ml) can of original Bawls contained 95 calories (400 J), and both its composition and guarana suppliers remained unchanged from 1996.

=== Packaging ===
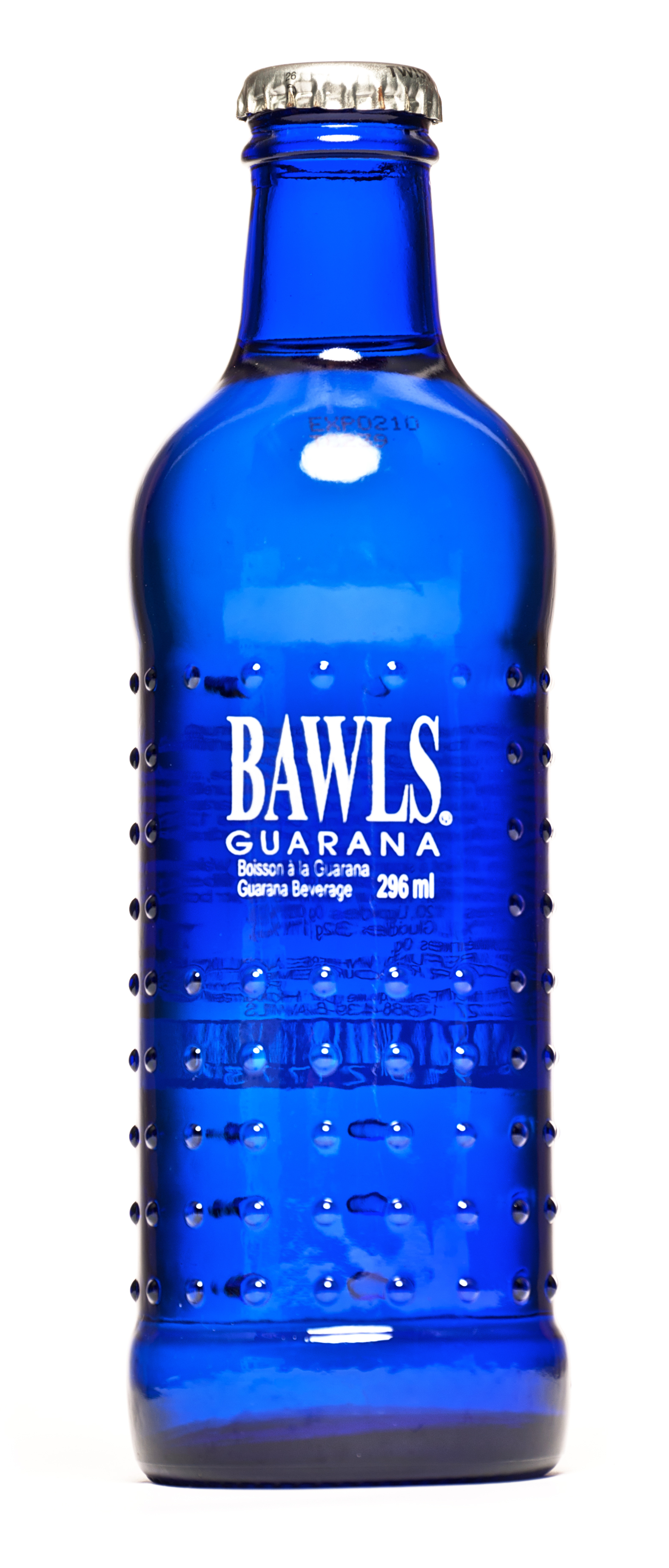
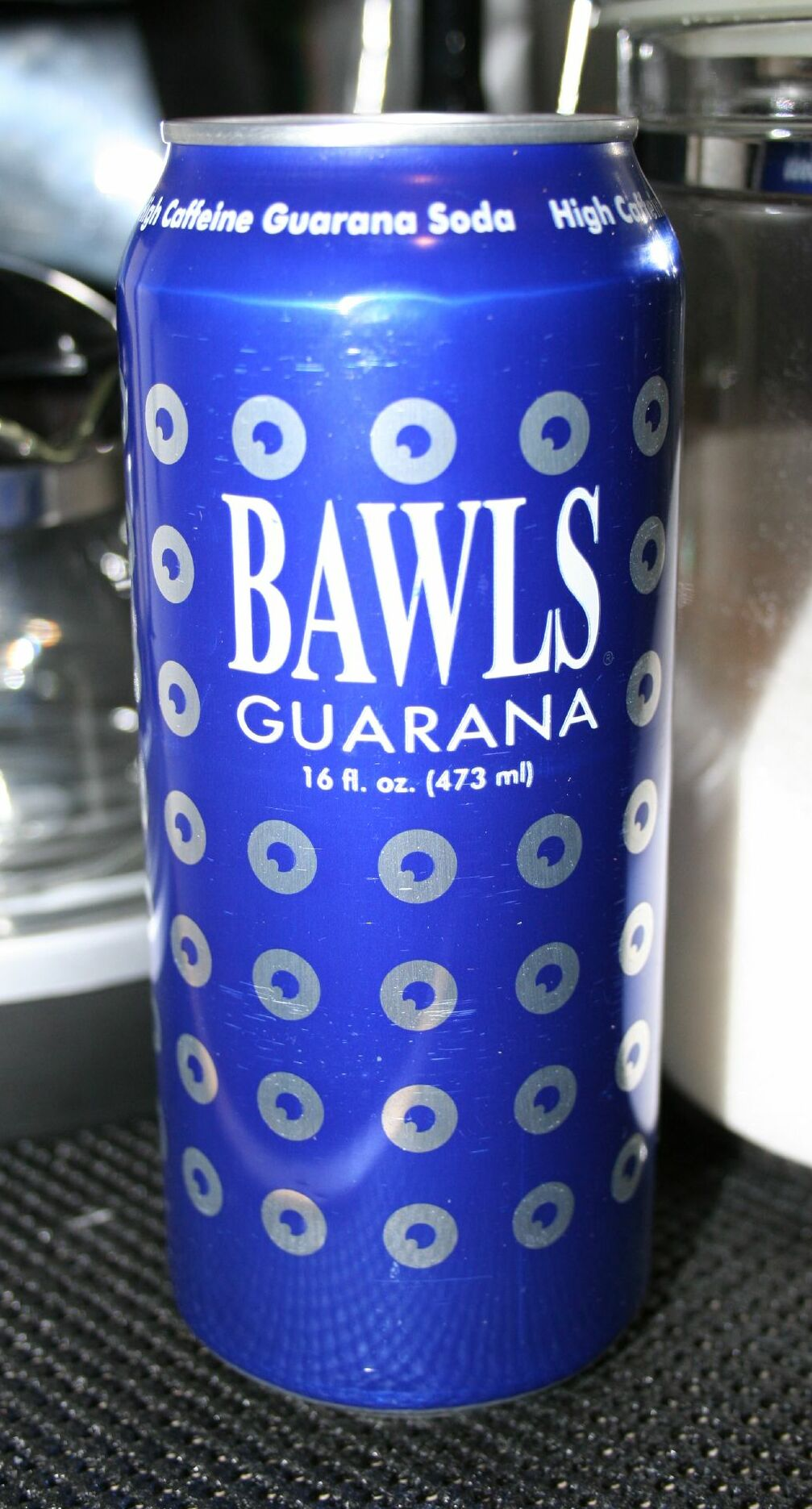
A Bawls bottle (2009) and can (2007)

In 2003, Bawls sourced its cobalt-blue bottles from Germany, and the bottle caps from Ecuador. They came together in Hillside, New Jersey where Bawls was bottled with guarana from Brazil. Circa 2005, Buppert described the drink's brand identity as based on the unique bottles, where the raised bumps "convey the idea of 'bouncing balls inside the bottle punching their way out.'"

In 2006, Hobarama developed a canned variant of Bawls both for shipping to overseas fans serving with the United States Armed Forces, and distribution at events prohibiting glass containers (e.g. paintball tournaments). The company partnered with Crown Beverage Packaging to develop a can that would evoke the uniqueness of the textured bottles: the 16-US-fluid-ounce (470 ml) aluminum cans are the first to feature foaming ink, a new and then-unused technology that applies a low-gloss print that swells when heated, giving the cans a surface akin to the bottles. In Montreal, Crown's manufacturing of these new cans took 18.6–30 percent longer than traditional can-printing processes. Early versions of the can also featured color-changing ink that reflected whether or not it was chilled. The can was one of Brand Packaging's selections for "best new consumer package goods packages of 2006."

== Marketing ==
By 2002, Bawls was focusing its marketing on gamers, who amounted to 50 percent of the drink's consumers, and were "typically males between 18 and 34." Eschewing the health-benefits claims of other energy drinks of the time, Bawls instead focused on just being a soft drink with lots of caffeine, earning "an almost cult-like following among computer addicts looking for a source of energy to keep them awake for gaming binges lasting 15 to 24 hours straight." That year, the company sponsored 2500 LAN parties.

To capitalize on the connection, the national chain CompUSA began selling the soda in its stores "to court the hard-core gamer market" (those who played PC games for more than 40 hours per week). From 2004 through at least 2008, Bawls was featured at the Penny Arcade Expo, which brought the drink "a huge amount of attention". Bawls partnered with GameFly in 2008 to cross-promote each other through mutual discounts. In 2014, Bawls was still marketed to gamers, including sponsoring QuakeCon 2014 where 4,799.9 US gallons (18,170 L; 3,996.8 imp gal) were drunk.

In the mid-2000s, while Bawls had difficulty securing distribution in regular grocery stores (like Meijer) due to its name, the unique packaging worked in its favor.

=== Name ===
In a 1998 interview with CNNfn, Buppert said of the name, "[it] represents a state of mind. Bawls is a very common slang term—to be bold and daring—and that's how we see the product. […] I think it's very difficult for a consumer to forget a product called Bawls Guarana."

In 2002, The Mercury News reported that BAWLS was an abbreviation for Brazilian American Wildlife Society, "intended to promote sustainable uses for the rain forest". Buppert repeated that story to CNN in 2003.

A 2004 article by The Cornell Daily Sun said Buppert was brainstorming to emulate the strong names of existing brands (Flying Tiger, Red Bull), when "Bawls" instead came from a friend's joke of "Why don’t you just call it Balls?" Buppert affirmed this origin in a 2020s interview.

When Gunnerson was asked about the name in 2015, he said, "Bounce like a ball. It gives you enough energy and fuel. That was really the inspiration of it from my understanding. […] Bounce with BAWLS was really our one key tagline for quite some time."

=== Product placement ===
Hobarama and Vivendi Universal Games made a deal in 2002 for cross-promotion. Bawls received product placement as a game mechanic in the 2002 video game, Run Like Hell: protagonist Nick Conner drinks Bawls from vending machines to boost his health. In exchange, cases of Bawls bore advertisements for the game.

In the 2004 video game, Fallout: Brotherhood of Steel, a shakeup in the management of Interplay Entertainment led to the replacement of the Fallout franchise's iconic Nuka-Cola with the real-world Bawls for the franchise's first outing on consoles. The swap was not well-received by fans.

Bawls has also been featured in TV shows and films, including The Big Bang Theory, The Hangover, Silicon Valley, and Reno 911!.

=== Sponsorships ===
In 2002, the soda was the official soft drink of the Cyberathlete Professional League. Bawls has also been the official energy drink for the National Professional Paintball League (in 2004 and 2006), Mercedes-Benz Fashion Week (2008), and Olympus Fashion Week.

== Reception ==
In 1998, after Bawls was positively reviewed by Stephen Heaslip of Blue's News, the company's own site traffic increased by 2700–11320 percent. In 2003, The Baltimore Sun called the drink "a smooth and tasty sip." In 2005, Hobarama shipped 20 million bottles of Bawls. Ars Technica wrote of Bawls in 2008, "the huge amounts of caffeine within each bottle—along with the fact that it tastes far better than Red Bull—have made it a favorite beverage at many a LAN party and game tournament since [2004]."

== Variants ==
The sugar-free Bawls Guaranexx was the first variant of Bawls, released in 2003. In 2006, Hobarama partnered with 7-Eleven to produce a Bawls-based Slurpee (Sno Bawls) in the Dallas–Fort Worth metroplex. By 2008, additional Bawls variants were available, including Bawls Cherry and Bawls Exxtra. Bawls' root beer variant—G33k Beer—premiered at a 2008 Halo tournament in South Miami, Florida; that year it was named BevNET's Energy Drink of the Year.

As of August 2025, there were eleven combinations of Bawls flavors and packaging listed on the official website. In ten-US-fluid-ounce (300 ml) bottles were Original Soda, Zero, Orange, Ginger, Cherry Cola, Cherry, and Root Beer. The 16-US-fluid-ounce (470 ml) cans were sold with Original, Zero, Cherry, and Root Beer.
