= Exodus (role-playing game) =

Tabletop role-playing game

- Logo
- Publishers: Glutton Creeper Games
- Publication: 2008
- Genres: Science fiction, post-apocalyptic
- Systems: d20, OGL Modern

Exodus is a 2008 post-apocalyptic role-playing game developed and published by Glutton Creeper Games using the d20/OGL system. The game was originally set in the Fallout universe, but due to legal complications with the creator of the original Fallout intellectual property Interplay Entertainment, and Fallout's current copyright holder Bethesda Softworks, the license for the intellectual property was revoked. The final released product excludes all references to the Fallout intellectual property, though it retained a post-apocalyptic theme and most of its common elements with the Fallout setting.

== Background ==
Glutton Creeper Games obtained a license from Interplay to create a Fallout pen and paper role-playing game based on the d20 Modern system in 2006. Legal complications arose in mid-2007, when Bethesda Softworks' lawyers claimed Interplay was unable to license a role-playing game, and annulled the license deal. Glutton Creeper Games reworked the project into Exodus, removed all references to the Fallout franchise, and released the game in 2008. In spite of this, Exodus retained several concepts similar to the Fallout franchise with regards to its post-apocalyptic setting.

In 2009, Glutton Creeper Games and Interplay came to a settlement over the license dispute. Glutton Creeper Games became a subsidiary of 4 Hour Games by 2014, and the sourcebooks for Exodus were offered for sale on 4 Hour Games' website for a time.

== Premise ==
Exodus is set in southwest United States in the year 2042. The backstory of Exodus encompass an alternative history of 20th century from 1939 to 2012, which is the year of nuclear war's outbreak. In December 2012, on the winter solstice, a date prophesied by the Maya as the end of evolution, a date prophesied by Nostradamus as World's End, man chose to evolve by the process of natural selection through self extermination from nuclear fallout. The decade long war on terror escalated to a series of short events between many warring nations that ravaged the known world on all sides, forcing humanity into an "exodus" that would last 20 years before survivors could return from fallout shelters to the ruins of civilization and start a new era of human civilization.

== Reception ==
Writing for Flamesrising.com, Megan Robertson gave a positive review for Exodus, praising its post-apocalyptic Southwest United States setting, Mayan-inspired backstory, sound role-playing game mechanics, and adequate product support. Jim Moreno from Geek and Sundry included it in his list of Fallout-inspired tabletop RPGs to try.
