= Black Isle's Torn =

Cancelled video game

- Developer: Black Isle Studios
- Publisher: Interplay Entertainment
- Designer: David Maldonado
- Engine: Lithtech
- Platform: Microsoft Windows
- Release: Cancelled
- Genre: Role-playing
- Modes: Single-player, multiplayer

Black Isle's Torn was a role-playing video game developed for Windows by Black Isle Studios, announced on March 22, 2001, and cancelled in July of that year. The game was to use a modified version of the SPECIAL role-playing system, which had been implemented in the Fallout series. Developed on various editions of the Lithtech engine, Torn possessed features unseen in previous Black Isle Studios games, such as 3D graphics and real-time camera movement.

In Torn, the player assumed the role of a wanderer, who was cursed to bring misfortune to people and places around it. Under a king's orders, the player undertook quests to clarify a series of conflicting prophecies. Unlike several other Black Isle Studios games, the game was to take place in an original world titled "Torn" instead of a traditional Dungeons & Dragons location.

== Gameplay ==
Torn was to use a modified version of the SPECIAL system; combat occurred in quasi-real-time, rather than strictly being turn-based. To achieve this, Black Isle Studios created the "recovery system", in which action points were used to determine the amount a combatant could accomplish in a given amount of time. Action points were spent with each action, and based on what percentage of an acting character's total action points were used, that character would need to wait a varying amount of time before taking action again. For example, if two characters expend half of their action points, they will attack each other at the same speed, regardless of the point totals for each character. Exceptions to this were to include recovery being hindered by movement, using items, or switching equipment, which was always allowed, though it reset the recovery time.

Like Fallout, the game was not to support character classes; instead, the designers opted for a system where a player defined their character by the skills and special abilities selected when leveling up. For example, a character with skill choices of stealth and assassination would become the rough equivalent of a "rogue". The system would have allowed players to choose their characters' race, which would change the types of abilities selectable.

=== Companions ===
A player character with two companions.

Torn was to allow the player direct control over only the protagonist character. However, up to five artificial intelligence-controlled "companions" could be hired at once, and would have replaced a conventional adventuring party. Companions would have interacted with one another, obligating the player to find companions who worked well together.

Torn would have introduced a unique method for the player to communicate with and control allies; altering their behaviour through conversation, and a command menu and hot key-driven command system which allowed the player to give companions commands at any time. The system was based around the concept of simple behaviors, such as "Attack," which could be combined into complex strings. Companions could be ordered to attack, support, defend themselves, follow the player character without attacking, and/or remain behind. It was also possible for the player to command them to carry these orders out in "aggressive" or "passive" manners. Lastly, commands and manners could be "leashed" to other party members or the player character; for example, "support the entire party aggressively," or "support another companion passively." Depending on the playable character's personality, and the orders companions were given, their level of co-operation would vary.

Companions would have followed commands to the best of their ability, but in accordance with their personality; for example, a berserker-type companion told to attack aggressively would charge into melee combat, while an assassin-type companion would attempt to hide, and then creep about knocking foes unconscious or backstabbing. In contrast, a priestess-type companion might support the player character by casting beneficial spells, while a paladin-type would give support by attacking the player character's target, and then healing the protagonist after the battle or if he or she came close to dying.

While these features were publicized, Feargus Urquhart later stated that "even at the end of our work on Torn, we were still considering going back to a system that gave players direct, full control over the party members".

=== Magic system ===
Torn was to contain four types of magic: Chaos, Order, Alchemy and Summoning. Order magic primarily consisted of healing, protective, and empowering spells. Conversely, Chaos magic was to have consisted of harmful elemental attacks, detrimental status afflictions, and invisibility spells.

Alchemical magic was used to create or alter potions to achieve more powerful effects, repair or enchant items, identify unknown items or creatures, and combine different Order or Chaos spells to create spells with multiple elements (such as earth and fire spells creating a molten metal spell). Alchemical magic could also imbue a target with elemental attributes; for example, a warrior imbued with the Water element would deal extra cold-type damage but receive additional heat-type damage.

Lastly, Summoning magic was to consist of "Call" and "Gate" spells, the former summoning entities able to exist for a set duration of time, or until slain. Summoned creatures behaved in different manners; one type might simply defend the caster, while another worked to heal the caster and his or her allies. Gate spells opened a portal, allowing different things access to the game's world. Lead designer David Maldonado called the resulting spells "generally amongst the weirdest in the game," with the effect often being a combination of "normal" spells fired simultaneously.

Unlike Black Isle Studios' previous games, Torn would have used a "mana point" system. Each spell cast would deplete mana points; when fully depleted, a spell-caster would have been unable to cast spells until their mana had been restored. Certain races were more adept at casting certain types of magic than others, increasing the importance of racial choice in how the player wished to experience the game.

== Setting and plot ==
Torn's background plot established an omnipotent being, dubbed "the Architect," as the ultimate creator of the game's universe. The Architect created a number of god-like beings, who in turn created the world "Torn". The gods eventually divided into three separate factions, each pursuing a different philosophy. One faction worshipped Chaos, believing in constant alteration of the world, while another worshipped Order, believing that all things should remain unchanged; between these two was a third faction, which promoted balance between chaos and order.

The game's various races were originally created for combat purposes by the three factions of gods, as the deities struggled to dominate Torn with their respective viewpoints. The name of the game's world was to have been derived from this conflict, due to the ravaging of the world which took place. In the end, the Architect banished the feuding Chaos and Order factions to the ethereal realms of "nightmare" and "dream", respectively, and left Torn in the hands of the faction that advocated balance. While isolated, the Order and Chaos factions continued influencing the world's development, although their segregation forced them to act indirectly through agents still residing in Torn's world. Resulting from the ability of Torn's inhabitants to draw energy from the separate realms occupied by the gods of Chaos and Order, magic became available.

Black Isle Studios stated on multiple occasions that their goal was to create a world that was both familiar to role-playing game fans, while simultaneously new. David Maldonado once commented on this in an interview with IGN:

"I feel that a sense of familiarity and association is a powerful thing, and may be used to heighten a player's emotional experience in the game. If something can be tied into existing imagery (even if only subtly so) and be enhanced by or play off of pre-existing feelings and conceptions within the player, why throw away that extra bit of power at your disposal?"

Later in the interview, Maldonado explained how the world of Torn came about:

"I was given a set of directives by Feargus Urquhart, Black Isle Studios' division head. He was clear that he would encourage the sort of mature, gritty setting that we used in Fallout or Planescape: Torment, but didn't want a world that was simply "covered in darkness"... there should places of light, darkness, and a whole lot o' gray in between. He also wanted some sort of clear, over-arching conflict that influenced all things on some level but didn't simply overpower everything. We decided on Order vs. Chaos as it's far less black and white than Good vs. Evil... after all, agents of Order or Chaos could potentially use any means at their disposal to bring about the rise of their cause, meaning that either side has its share of goodies and baddies."

To this end, the game's plot was to contain a splinter group of Order followers who would scheme to destroy the entire world, in order to re-create it as a new, unblemished one, so as to achieve "ultimate order."

Torn's primary narrative revolved around a wandering protagonist character, cursed to bring pain and misfortune wherever he or she traveled, and to whomever he or she traveled with. A misguided king, later revealed to be the game's ultimate antagonist, would have acted as the player's benefactor, assigning them various quests in order to discover the truth about a series of apparently conflicting prophecies. It would eventually have been revealed that all the prophecies, and even the protagonist character's mysterious curse, could be rationalized, and were in fact related to the protagonist character, effectively granting the player control over which interpretation of the future was realized.

== Development ==
Announced during GDC 2001, Torn was subject to much interest by the press, because the team behind the cult classic Planescape: Torment was revealed to be developing it, and the game itself was to use the much-praised SPECIAL system. According to lead designer David Maldonado, the game had been in development for "about fourteen months" before its announcement.

Torn made a playable showing at E3 2001. Although the preview was an early build of the game with several graphical features disabled, it was generally well received. However, the division director of Black Isle Studios, Feargus Urquhart, later stated that the switch from the LithTech 2.3 engine to the upgraded 3.0 version shortly before the E3 presentation had "significant ramifications", and the amount of changing and recoding necessitated by the switch caused the game's E3 showing to suffer.

In July 2001, after circulation of rumors, Torn was officially cancelled. Following the incident, five members of Black Isle Studios' staff were laid off. The ultimate reason for Torn's cancellation was eventually revealed by Feargus Urquhart:

"I don't know if we ever released an official reason on why [Torn] was canceled, but in a nutshell, the game was canceled because it was not going to be done in time to get Interplay the revenue the company needed to continue operations. That sounds like it was all Interplay's fault, but that's really not the case. The project was not going well and continued to be an ongoing challenge."
