= Baldur's Gate: Dark Alliance II =

2004 video game

- North American PlayStation 2 cover art
- Developer: Black Isle Studios
- Publisher: Interplay Entertainment
- Producer: Kevin Osburn
- Designer: David Maldonado
- Programmer: Bernie Weir
- Artist: Jonathan Hales
- Composers: Craig Stuart Garfinkle; Jeremy Soule
- Series: Baldur's Gate
- Engine: Dark Alliance Engine
- Platforms: PlayStation 2; Xbox; Linux; macOS; Microsoft Windows; Nintendo Switch; PlayStation 4; PlayStation 5; Xbox One; Xbox Series X|S
- Release: PlayStation 2 and Xbox; NA: January 20, 2004; EU: February 6, 2004; Linux, macOS, Windows, Switch, PS4, PS5, Xbox One, and Xbox Series X/S; WW: July 20, 2022
- Genres: Action role-playing, hack and slash
- Modes: Single-player, multiplayer

Baldur's Gate: Dark Alliance II is a 2004 hack and slash action role-playing game for PlayStation 2 and Xbox developed by Black Isle Studios and published by Interplay Entertainment, with distribution handled by Vivendi Universal Games in North America and Avalon Interactive/Acclaim Entertainment in Europe. It is the sequel to the 2001 game Baldur's Gate: Dark Alliance.

The game is set in the Forgotten Realms campaign setting of Dungeons & Dragons, and the gameplay is based on the rules of Dungeons & Dragons 3rd Edition, which were released in 2000. Dark Alliance II is a direct sequel to the original Dark Alliance game, with the story following five adventurers attempting to save Baldur's Gate from a growing evil, and ascertain the fate of the protagonists from the first game.

Dark Alliance II was well received on both platforms, although many critics felt it was not much of an advancement on the first game. A sequel was planned, but was cancelled early in development due to legal problems and the closure of Black Isle Studios after Interplay went bankrupt. The use of the Dark Alliance game engine led to a lawsuit filed by the engine's creators, Snowblind Studios, against publisher Interplay, which alleged the engine had been used in the game without Snowblind's permission.

The game was later re-released being ported for Linux, macOS, Microsoft Windows, Nintendo Switch, PlayStation 4, PlayStation 5, Xbox One, and Xbox Series X|S in July 2022.

== Gameplay ==
Gameplay in the PlayStation 2 version of Dark Alliance II, showing Ysuran fighting an ettin. His health and mana meters are at the top left of the screen. The green meter between them is his experience meter. The gold icon below indicates he has acquired enough experience to level up.

Baldur's Gate: Dark Alliance II is a real-time hack and slash action role-playing game presented in a 3D perspective, with a rotatable isometric three-quarter top-down view.

At the beginning of the game, character stats are preset, with the player able to choose from five race/class combinations; a human barbarian (Dorn Redbear), a drow monk (Vhaidra Uoswiir), a moon-elf necromancer (Ysuran Auondril), a dwarven rogue (Borador Goldhand) or a human cleric (Allessia Faithhammer). The player can customize their character's stats through gaining experience points from defeating enemies. Every time the character increases in level, points are awarded corresponding to that level; i.e. if a character increases to level twelve, the player will gain twelve experience points to spend on the character's spells and feats. For every four levels which the character increases, the player is given one ability point to spend on one of the six core attributes (strength, intelligence, wisdom, dexterity, constitution, charisma).

Each of the five characters have their own unique fighting style and their own specific set of spells and feats. Gameplay strategy is thus different for each character. Dorn is a Barbarian, and his feats tend to focus on increasing his brute strength and ability to resist damage, as well as granting him powerful abilities to aid in melee combat, such as the ability to wield two-handed weapons in each hand. Vhaidra relies on unarmed combat, so her feats tend to focus on increasing her speed and combos, as well as granting her close-range abilities, such as pushing enemies away from her. As Ysuran is a necromancer, his feats tend to focus on increasing the power of his magic and granting him new spells, such as the ability to use shadow magic. Borador tends more towards archery, but is also capable of melee combat. His spells tend to focus on allowing him to use a shield offensively, and granting him the ability to set traps for enemies and disarm traps intended for the player. Allessia is a cleric and has access to many healing and defensive spells. She can also use melee combat. Later in the game she gains the ability to reanimate the dead, and have them fight alongside her.

Gameplay is semi-linear; most of the main quests can be performed in different orders, but only from within a group of given quests. For example, in Act I, the player can choose to tackle a series of kidnappings or investigate a spate of murders, but no other main quests are made available until both quests are complete. There are also optional side-quests, which do not have to be completed. There are more NPCs than in the first game, and the player can interact with many of them. Depending on which character the player is using, these NPCs may or may not provide information and assistance. Weapons, armor and items are only available for purchase from one location throughout the game, a shop in Baldur's Gate, although the stock changes at the commencement of each act, with the weapons increasing in expense and power. The HUD features the option to use either a transparent map that covers most of the screen, or a mini-map, with the player also given the option to turn the map off entirely.

The game also features cooperative gameplay with another player. Both players share the same screen, and are thus limited in how far they can move away from one another. In co-op mode, both players get 50% of the experience for each kill, no matter which player makes the kill. Additionally, unlike in the original game, all treasure is pooled for both players, regardless of which player collects it.

A new feature in Dark Alliance II gives players the ability to create custom weapons and armor. Players can improve items by using runestones and gems. To increase the strength of an item, at least one runestone must be used. Gems are optional, although adding gems increases the strength further and enhances certain of the items' attributes. The player cannot place more gems on an item than runestones; if the player wishes to place four gems, they must have a minimum of four runestones attached. Each item can have two different types of gem attached at any one time, in addition to the required runestones. There are several different kinds of gem and each has a different effect on different types of item. For example, a pearl attached to a piece of armor gives +1 additional treasure drop, attached to a weapon gives +1 "Improved Critical", and attached to a trinket gives +1 Wisdom.

The game contains four difficulty levels: "Easy", "Normal", "Hard" and "Extreme". Extreme is unlocked once the player has completed any of the other three levels. Extreme mode takes the form of a New Game Plus, and can only be played by importing a saved character from another game. The game also contains two secret characters: Drizzt Do'Urden and Artemis Entreri. Drizzt becomes available to use in the main game upon beating any difficulty level. Artemis is unlocked upon defeating Extreme.

== Plot ==
=== Setting and characters ===
While the original game focused on three areas in the Sword Coast and Western Heartlands regions of the Faerûnian continent, the second game is predominately based in and around the city of Baldur's Gate itself.

The game features five main playable characters; Dorn Redbear, Ysuran Aundril, Borador Goldhand, Vhaidra Uoswiir and Allessia Faithhammer, each of whom has come to Baldur's Gate for different reasons. Dorn seeks fame and glory. Vhaidra has come looking for vengeance against those who have attempted to destroy her family. Ysuran is suffering from amnesia and has come in the hope of finding clues to his past. Borador comes for wealth, in order to release his clan from its debt to the drow. Allessia comes to spread the word of Helm and advance to become a high-ranking priest.

=== Story ===
The game begins by revealing that after jumping through the portal at the top of the Onyx Tower, Vahn, Kromlech and Adrianna are taken prisoner by the vampire Mordoc SeLanmere.

Meanwhile, outside Baldur's Gate, Dorn, Vhaidra, Ysuran, Borador and Allessia meet on the Trade Way, and learn that since the collapse of Xantam's Guild, the route has become increasingly dangerous due to the rise of the Red Fang Marauders, a goblin army who prey on travelers. After infiltrating a nearby Marauders cave, and freeing the caravan guard Randalla, the heroes head to Wayfork Village, a nearby fiefdom. There, they rescue the village from the Marauders and kill their hobgoblin leader, Harnak.

Upon entering Baldur's Gate, Randalla hires them to investigate a series of murders in the city. At Bloodmire Manor, they learn that Luvia Bloodmire has been combining the body parts of various creatures in an attempt to make a new species, and has been giving her creations to Lady Aragozia Firewind. Her first creation, Argesh, has set up the Hands of Glory, a thieves' guild faction of the Marauders. The heroes kill Argesh, crippling the Hands of Glory, and infiltrate the main base of the Marauders. There, they defeat but do not kill the Red Queen, leader of the Marauders. They follow her to Lady Arogazia's manor, and learn that Arogazia is a member of the Zhentarim, a criminal network intent on ruling Faerûn. She has been using the Marauders in an effort to bring back the Onyx Tower. Along with her associate Kharne (a former member of Xantham's Guild, presumed killed in the first game), Arogazia escapes from the heroes, revealing herself as the polymorphed form of the red Dragon, Aizagora.

Impressed with their efforts, Jherek, a member of the Harpers, requests that the heroes find four elemental objects. Meanwhile, the Zhentarim are also trying to attain the objects to reactivate the Onyx Tower. During their journey, the heroes encounter Sleyvas, the humanoid lizard who betrayed the protagonists at the end of Dark Alliance. He too is working for the Zhentarim, and the heroes kill him. After finding the four objects, each of the heroes pursues their own personal quest.

After killing the dragon Baragoth, the druid inside Dorn is awakened. Ysuran realizes his horrific past and his hate crimes against humans, determining not to worry about the past, but instead build a good name for himself in the future. Borador frees Gandam's Hold and reclaims the Goblinbreaker name for his clan, who begin working on new forges to free themselves from their debt to fey folk. Vhaidra travels to Cloud Peaks and gets her revenge on a murderous black elf who assisted in the fall of her family's house. Allessia frees the Church of Helm in Baldur's Gate from Goreth Vileback, a cleric of Cyric.

After the five return to town, Jherek enlists them for a journey to each of the Elemental Planes to activate the Elemental Foundations using the four objects they recovered. In each plane, they are attacked by the Zhentarim, who are in control of the Foundations. Luvia Bloodmire and Aizagora attack them, but are defeated. Upon returning from the final plane and speaking to Jherek, they are approached by Kharne. He tells them the Zhentarim no longer wish to reactivate the Onyx Tower, and that the Harpers and the Zhentarim have a common enemy: Mordoc SeLanmere. Mordoc believes he can use the Tower to bring about the downfall of Baldur's Gate, which will please his "allies in the east". His steward, Xanhast, interrogates Vahn, Adrianna and Kromlech, finding they know little of the larger scheme playing out. Kharne, Jherek and the five adventurers storm Mordoc's Keep of Pale Night. They rescue the trio of adventurers, forcing Mordoc to speed up his plans, and relocate the Onyx Tower into Baldur's Gate ahead of schedule.

Now called Mordoc's Gate, the entire population of the city are turned into zombies. The five adventurers attack the Tower, kill Xanhast, and attack Mordoc in the Elemental Plane of Shadows. After killing him, they destroy the Onyx Heart, supposedly destroying the Tower forever. This releases the citizens from their zombification, and led by Randalla, they thank the heroes for saving the city. Meanwhile, in a room with an Ancient Egyptian milieu, a servant tells a stone sarcophagus that Mordoc has failed and Baldur's Gate still stands. The sarcophagus says that Mordoc's failure will not interrupt his "sacred" mission, and orders his servant to prepare the army and ready his sun barge.

== Development and cancelled sequel ==
Dark Alliance II was first mentioned in April 2001, when Interplay Entertainment confirmed that if the first game was successful, a sequel would enter development immediately. The game was officially announced in March 2003 for PlayStation 2 and Xbox. The only information available at that time was that the game would introduce item crafting, have five playable characters and was slated for a simultaneous PlayStation/Xbox release in the winter of 2003. In May, IGN published an interview with Kevin Osburn, head of the development team at Black Isle Studios and the game's producer. Osburn revealed that the developers had taken on-board criticisms of the first game, and addressed those problems in the sequel, as well as making everything bigger, with more enemies, characters, weapons, locations and quests.

At E3 in May 2003, Interplay showcased the Xbox version of the game, revealing three of the new characters: a human barbarian, a moon-elf necromancer and a drow monk. Interplay considered porting the game to GameCube if the PlayStation 2 and Xbox versions sold well. In July, demos for both the PlayStation 2 and Xbox versions were released. All five characters were available for play, and their character-specific sidequests were finalized. Weapon creation was also showcased, as was co-op mode. Both IGN and GameSpot were impressed with the demo, although both expressed some concern that the graphics was essentially the same as in the first game. At the 2003 Gen Con in July, the game was revealed to be 90% complete and was on schedule for an October release.

In September, Interplay canceled its distribution deal with Vivendi Universal Games, due to alleged breaches of the working agreement and failure of payment. According to Herve Caen, CEO of Interplay:

In the interest of our company and its shareholders, we had no choice but to terminate this agreement. After several notifications to Vivendi of its failure to perform in accordance with the terms of our agreement and, in particular, in refusing to pay Interplay certain monies due following our latest release, Lionheart, we still did not receive the payments owed to us. We are currently evaluating several other distribution options. We fully expect to release two of our strongest titles, Baldur's Gate: Dark Alliance II and Fallout: Brotherhood of Steel for Xbox and PlayStation 2 in the fourth quarter.

In October, EB Games and GameStop websites changed the release dates for the game to January 2004. Interplay initially denied the delay, stating it was still aiming for a fourth quarter release, and would distribute the game itself if necessary. Interplay also stated that despite the fallout, Vivendi Universal would still distribute the title and any future installments in the series in Europe. By November, Interplay had resolved its legal dispute with Vivendi, and returned to their prior distribution agreement. The game was also confirmed to be delayed until early 2004.

In December, reports surfaced that Interplay had shut down Black Isle Studios, although Interplay itself made no formal statement. According to IGN, Black Isle Studios was closed that month, and that existed only as a brand under the Interplay label. They reported that when Black Isle's director had quit, the studio was placed under the management of Digital Mayhem, but with the agreement that Interplay would adopt a more hands-off approach. By this stage, Black Isle had already begun work on Dark Alliance III. The title was cancelled after Interplay failed to retain the license to use the Dungeons & Dragons label from Wizards of the Coast, so Black Isle shifted focus to Fallout 3. They handed in a 95% complete demo, including all game functionality. Interplay however, who was several million dollars in debt, with just over $1 million in the bank, began to fire people from Digital Mayhem. Two weeks later, all but two members of the Fallout team were fired. This effectively meant Black Isle Studios no longer existed as anything other than a brand. Apparently, staff were told by Interplay that they will continue to produce titles under that brand. Interplay however denied the rumors about shutting the studio, saying that Black Isle Studios was involved with other projects, which included Fallout 3 (under the working title Van Buren) and Fallout: Brotherhood of Steel. An anonymous former Black Isle employee later confirmed to IGN that the studio had been closed, and that although Dark Alliance II would still be released, Fallout 3 and Dark Alliance III had been officially cancelled.

Dark Alliance II was released for both PlayStation 2 and Xbox on January 20, 2004, with Vivendi Universal Games handling North American distribution of the title. Initially, Vivendi Universal planned on distributing the game in Europe as well, but at the end of that month, Avalon Interactive, Interplay's European distributor, entered into an agreement with Acclaim Entertainment to distribute the title in the UK, France, Germany, and Benelux territories.

A version of the game was later re-released for Linux, macOS, Microsoft Windows, Nintendo Switch, PlayStation 4, PlayStation 5, Xbox One, and Xbox Series X/S on July 20, 2022.

=== Lawsuit ===
In November 2003, Snowblind Studios, developers of the original Dark Alliance and creators of the Dark Alliance engine, filed a lawsuit against Interplay. Snowblind alleged that Interplay had used the game engine in several games without their permission and withheld royalties due from the sale of those games. These games were the GameCube version of the first Dark Alliance game, which was developed by High Voltage Software, Fallout: Brotherhood of Steel, and Dark Alliance II. The lawsuit was settled in April 2005, and determined that while Interplay could continue to publish materials already using the Dark Alliance engine, they could not use the engine in any future projects. The lawsuit also saw Interplay transfer the Baldur's Gate trademark to Atari and temporarily transfer the Dark Alliance trademark to Snowblind.

== Soundtrack ==
A soundtrack for Dark Alliance II has not been released. In September 2013, composer Craig Stuart Garfinkle released an album called Songs of the Dragon, V2 featuring primarily music from the game.

Songs of the Dragon, V2
No.	Title	Length
1.	"The Battle Rages (from Baldur's Gate: Dark Alliance II)"	1:23
2.	"A Cavern of Death (from Baldur's Gate: Dark Alliance II)"	2:36
3.	"Revelation in the Dark (from Baldur's Gate: Dark Alliance II)"	1:44
4.	"Mired in Blood (from Baldur's Gate: Dark Alliance II)"	1:53
5.	"Good and Evil (from Baldur's Gate: Dark Alliance II)"	2:29
6.	"The Dark Dungeon (from Baldur's Gate: Dark Alliance II)"	3:32
7.	"Colored in Red (from Baldur's Gate: Dark Alliance II)"	3:58
8.	"Battle for Redemption (from Baldur's Gate: Dark Alliance II)"	1:29
9.	"Death for Life"	0:45
10.	"Bump in the Night"	4:01

== Reception ==
Reception

Aggregate score
Aggregator	Score	
Aggregator	PS2	Xbox
Metacritic	78/100	77/100

Review scores
Publication	Score	
Publication	PS2	Xbox
Eurogamer		7/10
Game Informer	8.5/10	
GameSpot	8/10	8/10
GameSpy	3/5	
IGN	8.4/10	8.4/10
Official U.S. PlayStation Magazine	3.5/5	
Official Xbox Magazine (US)		7.9/10

Baldur's Gate: Dark Alliance II received "generally favorable reviews", with the PlayStation 2 version holding an aggregate score of 78 out of 100 on Metacritic, based on forty-four reviews, and the Xbox version 77 out of 100, based on forty-four reviews.

Game Informer's Andrew Reiner scored the PlayStation 2 version 8.5 out of 10, calling it a "role-playing bliss", praising the range of characters, missions and weaponry, the item customization, the non-linear structure and the range of environments. Comparing the game to the original, he said that DAII has "a much deeper play" with a higher level of interaction.

IGN's Ed Lewis scored the game 8.4 out of 10, opining that Black Isle Studios made an appropriate continuation of the story, but was critical of the similarity of the gameplay to the first game and felt that there should have been more variety in the game's missions, more weapons and characters, and that the gameplay could have been less linear.

GameSpot's Ryan Davis scored the game 8 out of 10, and praised the range of missions and the ability to craft new weaponry, but was critical of the graphics, which he felt hadn't really advanced from the first game. He called Baldur's Gate: Dark Alliance II "a well-crafted, accessible action RPG experience". GameSpot later named Dark Alliance II the best Xbox game of January 2004.

Eurogamer's Ronan Jennings scored the Xbox version 7 out of 10. While generally positive to the gameplay and graphics, he felt that "DAII feels more like an expansion pack" rather than as a full-fledged sequel and that the game does not have the same "magic" as the original game had.

GameSpy's Raymond Padulla scored the PlayStation 2 version 3 out of 5. He praised the differentiation in the fighting style of the playable characters, but felt that it was inferior to the original game in some other aspects. He was also critical of the graphics, saying that some parts of the game are "dated". He called Dark Alliance II a good game, but said that the game did not progress too much compared to the original game. Writing later in 2004, Allen Raucsh said that Black Isle Studios "took over the development chores" for this game, but that ultimately delivered the same game without some significant innovations.

In 2015, Ian Williams of Paste rated the game #7 on his list of "The 10 Greatest Dungeons and Dragons Videogames". He called its gameplay to be more akin to Diablo than Baldur's Gate, in which the characters cannot be created from scratch, but that the game offers a wide variety of playstyles for playable characters, the game's customization while leveling up, and a co-op mode, compared to other DnD games for PC platform.

=== Re-release ===
Reception

Aggregate score
Aggregator	Score
Metacritic	(PC) 63/100 (NS) 68/100

Review scores
Publication	Score
Nintendo Life	5/10
TouchArcade	3.5/5

The re-release version of the game received "mixed or average" reviews, according to Metacritic.

Mitch Vogel of Nintendo Life gave the game five stars out of ten, praising its gear crafting system and dark atmosphere while lamenting its sluggish combat, drab environmental design, lack of online, low build variety, and high price tag, and felt that the game was "left in the dust" by more modern releases.

Shaun Musgrave of TouchArcade compared the title unfavorably to modern offerings on the Switch such as Diablo III and the Torchlight franchise, citing the no-frills nature of the port and its high price tag as blemishes on a dated experience.
