= Van Buren (video game) =

- The logo for Black Isle Studios' Fallout 3 used in promotional artwork
- Developer: Black Isle Studios
- Publisher: Interplay Entertainment
- Designers: Chris Avellone; Josh Sawyer
- Series: Fallout
- Platform: Microsoft Windows
- Release: Canceled
- Genre: Role-playing
- Mode: Single-player

Fallout 3, often referred to by its development codename Van Buren, is a canceled role-playing video game developed by Black Isle Studios. It was intended to be the third game in the mainline Fallout series before its cancellation in 2003. Set in the year 2253, the plot of Van Buren revolved around an escaped prisoner who would explore the American Southwest while pursued by robotic prison guards. The main antagonist was a mad scientist named Victor Presper, who planned on using the prisoner as an inadvertent vector to spread a deadly virus. Gameplay would have included a mixture of real-time and turn-based combat. The player would explore the map with a team of non-playable character (NPC) companions. Each NPC would make their own independent decisions which would affect the story.

Van Buren was Black Isle's second attempt at making a third mainline Fallout game. After the initial attempt was canceled, designer Chris Avellone worked on a Fallout themed tabletop role-playing game in his spare time. He ran two separate games with Black Isle members, and the actions of the players inspired nearly all of the content in Van Buren. The development of Van Buren was hampered by the financial struggles of publisher Interplay Entertainment. When the Black Isle game Baldur's Gate III: The Black Hound was canceled, Avellone resigned. Josh Sawyer replaced Avellone as the lead designer, but he too resigned due to mismanagement from Interplay. In December 2003, Van Buren was canceled in favor of Fallout: Brotherhood of Steel. Following Bethesda Softworks' purchase of the Fallout series in 2007, they began work on their own Fallout 3 unrelated to the game developed by Black Isle, which was released the following year. Some of the story elements from Van Buren were later used in the 2010 game Fallout: New Vegas. Fans have attempted to recreate and finish Van Buren using a leaked playable demo and 700-page design document as reference.

== Premise ==
Van Buren would have used isometric graphics.

Set in the year 2253, the plot of Van Buren revolved around a prisoner, who the player could decide was either guilty or wrongfully accused of their crime. The player could decide the race of the prisoner: human, ghoul, or super mutant. This decision would affect which quests, communities, and skills the player could interact with. At the beginning of the game, the prisoner would escape, and explore the American Southwest while being chased by robotic prison guards. The map consisted of Arizona, Colorado, Nevada, and Utah, and the player could visit locations like Denver and the Grand Canyon.

During the game, the player would learn that the prisoner carries a virus that either kills its host or makes them sterile. The player would learn that in order to get the prison guards to stop following them, they would need to capture other escaped prisoners. The climax of the game would reveal that a mad scientist named Victor Presper tricked the player into capturing prisoners so that they could spread the virus as a vector. Presper would enact a nuclear holocaust on the infected population. There were several endings, which were determined by the player's actions throughout the story. One of the endings involved the prisoner using Presper's nuclear satellite to destroy part of the world. In addition to Presper, there were multiple subplots related to different factions, such as a war between the Brotherhood of Steel and the New California Republic, a tribal army inspired by the Roman legion called Caesar's Legion, and a matriarchal tribe called the Daughters of Hecate.

The gameplay of Van Buren would have included a mixture of real-time and turn-based combat. The player would explore the map with a team of non-playable character (NPC) companions. Each NPC would make their own independent decisions which would affect the story. Throughout the game, the player would encounter another malevolent group of AI-controlled NPCs. This group would make decisions that would affect the story. Other notable mechanics included the usage of a theme song for any skill of the player's choosing, and the need to repair railway lines in order to fast travel.

== Development ==
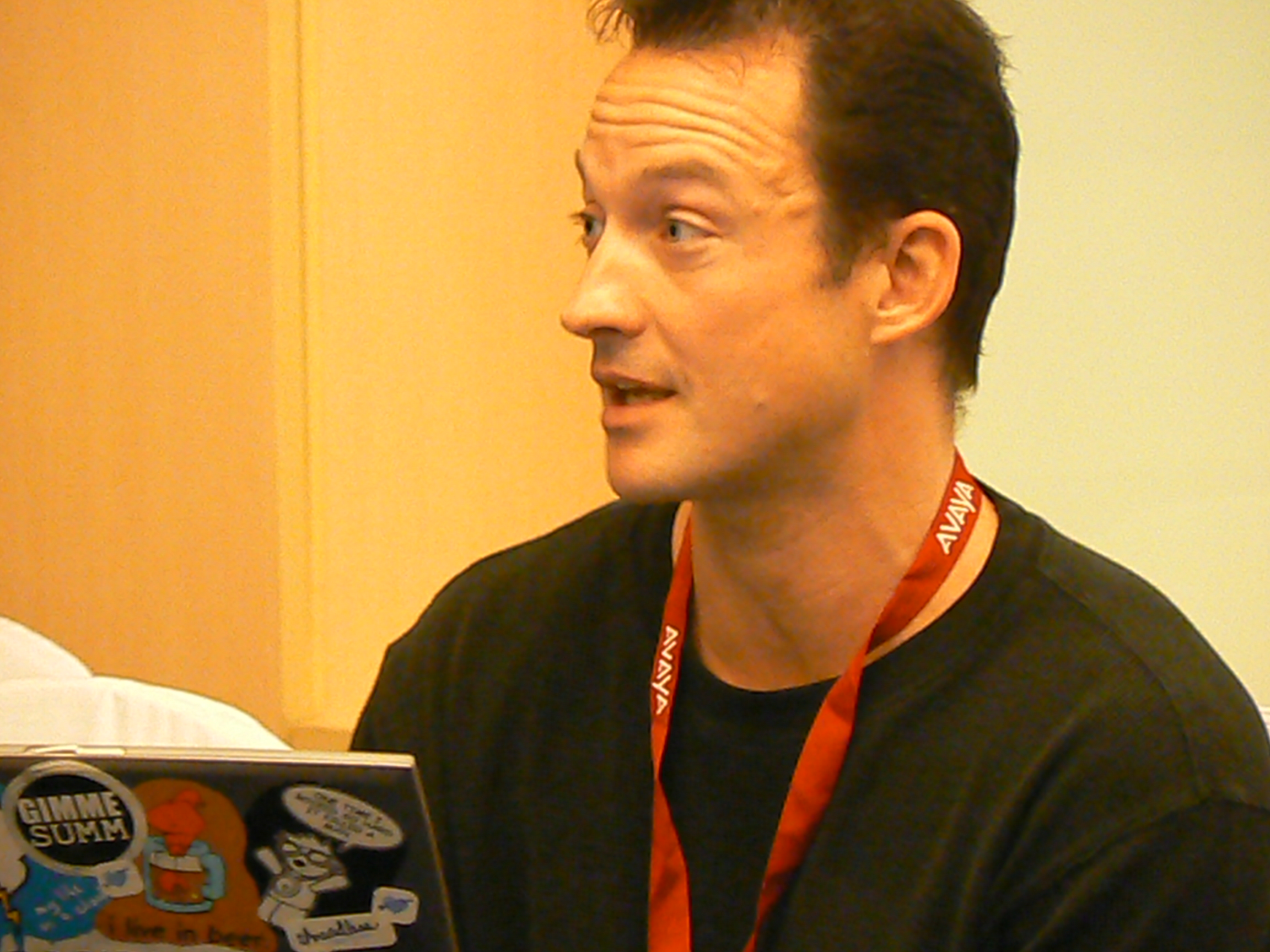
Chris Avellone ran two separate Fallout themed tabletop role-playing games, and the actions of the players inspired nearly all of the content that would have been in Van Buren.

After the release of Fallout 2 in 1998, Black Isle Studios decided the next Fallout game should feature 3D graphics. Development on what was intended to be the third game in the Fallout series coincided with the development of Planescape: Torment. Black Isle worked with the game engine NDL, but due to their inexperience with the 3D engine, development was slow. Black Isle's publisher Interplay Entertainment canceled the project, and moved the team over to the development of what would become Icewind Dale. After the project's cancellation, designer Chris Avellone worked on a Fallout themed tabletop role-playing game in his spare time. He ran two separate games with Black Isle members simultaneously, and did not tell them that their actions were affecting the other game. Nearly all of the content in Van Buren, from the characters to the story, was inspired by the actions of the players during these tabletop games.

At the time, Interplay was undergoing a period of financial hardship, an issue that would persist for several years. Journalist Kat Bailey credits Interplay's financial struggles to the increased cost for game development, and the industry shift toward console gaming in the late 1990s. As a result, layoffs and project cancellations became commonplace for Interplay affiliated studios. In 2003, Interplay lost the license to publish Dungeons & Dragons games on computers, but retained the rights to publish games for consoles. This occurred while Black Isle was developing the Dungeons & Dragons game Baldur's Gate III: The Black Hound, and the project was canceled. Avellone resigned shortly after. When asked about this period, Avellone remarked, "[Interplay founder] Brian Fargo was gone by that point, and the vision for the company went along with him. And while we knew [Interplay] needed to turn a profit, we were starting to feel it in the trenches." After the cancellation of Baldur's Gate III: The Black Hound, Interplay instructed Black Isle to retool the game engine and focus on making a new Fallout game, codenamed Van Buren. The codename was a reference to Martin Van Buren, the eighth president of the United States.

Josh Sawyer took over as lead designer for Van Buren, while Tom French served as the producer. Sawyer notes that he condensed the story Avellone had already written so that it would work on a smaller scale. During development, Sawyer made multiple attempts to get Interplay to evaluate the work that had been done, but he never received a response. According to Sawyer, "It basically made me think, 'They have either no interest or no care for what we're doing'." When Interplay moved one of the remaining character artists for Van Buren onto a different project, Sawyer resigned. During this period, series creator and former Interplay developer Tim Cain was asked to play a demo of Van Buren. The vice president of Interplay asked Cain to estimate how long it would take to complete the game, to which Cain responded 12 to 18 months. The vice president then told Cain that any estimate over 6 months would necessitate the cancellation of Van Buren. Sawyer believes Cain's 18 month estimation was too optimistic, and posited an actual development period of at least 24 months.

In December 2003, Van Buren was canceled, and the remaining Black Isle staff were laid off. Cain believes that the cancelation came down to money: "I do not believe that [with] the money they had left, the game in the state it was in, and the people who were working on it could have completed it within six months ... and [if they did], I don't think it would have been a game you would have liked playing." Interplay's parent company Titus Interactive wanted to focus on console releases, and Van Buren was canceled in favor of Fallout: Brotherhood of Steel. Sawyer estimates that Van Buren had been in development for around half a year before its cancellation.

== Later developments ==
In 2007, Bethesda Softworks purchased the Fallout intellectual property. The following year they released Fallout 3. Fallout 3 was well received by critics, and sold more than 5 million copies in 2008. Although the plot of Fallout 3 was completely unrelated to Van Buren, some story elements from the canceled game were used in the follow-up Fallout: New Vegas, such as the American Southwest setting and Caesar's Legion. Fallout: New Vegas was developed by Obsidian Entertainment, a company Avellone cofounded after he left Black Isle.

In 2014, the company Roxy Friday LLC registered a trademark for the names "Meantime" and "Van Buren". Meantime was the canceled follow-up to Wasteland. Some journalists noted that Roxy Friday LLC was a subsidiary of Brian Fargo's company inXile Entertainment, and since Fargo directed Wasteland, he might try to resurrect the Meantime and Van Buren projects. Fargo later told Eurogamer that he registered the Van Buren trademark in the hope of working with Avellone on a game akin to Van Buren when the two had availability.

One month after Bethesda purchased the Fallout intellectual property, a playable demo for Van Buren was leaked online, along with a 700-page design document. The demo showcased what would have been the tutorial, a self-contained storyline about a town that is attacked by Chinese-affiliated communist insurgents. There have been multiple attempts by fans to recreate and finish Van Buren using the playable demo as reference, including mods for Fallout 2 and Fallout: New Vegas, as well as a full game developed in the Unity engine. Jody MacGregor of PC Gamer noted that Van Buren holds a "mythic quality among Fallout fans" due to the wealth of information about the game.
