= Fallout (franchise) =

Video game seriеs

- Genres: 1997–2004: Role-playing; since 2004: Action role-playing First-person shooter Third-person shooter
- Developers: Interplay Entertainment; Black Isle Studios; Micro Forté; Bethesda Game Studios; Obsidian Entertainment; Fantasy Flight Games; Modiphius Entertainment; Gaea Mobile
- Publishers: Interplay Entertainment; (1997–2004); 14 Degrees East; (2001); Bethesda Softworks; (since 2004)
- Creators: Tim Cain; Leonard Boyarsky
- Platforms: DOS; Windows; Mac OS; Mac OS X; Nintendo Switch; Nintendo Switch 2; PlayStation 2; PlayStation 3; PlayStation 4; PlayStation 5; Xbox; Xbox 360; Xbox One; Xbox Series X/S; iOS; Android
- First release: Fallout; October 10, 1997
- Latest release: Fallout 76; November 14, 2018

Fallout is an American media franchise of post-apocalyptic role-playing video games created by Tim Cain and Leonard Boyarsky, at Interplay Entertainment. The series, set in the first half of the 3rd millennium, follows the descendants of survivors of a mutually destructive nuclear exchange between the United States and China that culminated a series of conflicts over resources which began in the middle of the 21st century. The games share an atompunk retrofuturistic setting and artwork influenced by the post-war culture of the 1950s United States, with its combination of hope for the promise of technology and the fear of nuclear annihilation. Fallout is regarded as a spiritual successor to Wasteland, a 1988 game also developed by Interplay.

The series' first title, Fallout, was developed by Black Isle Studios and released in 1997, and its sequel, Fallout 2, the following year. With the tactical role-playing game Fallout Tactics: Brotherhood of Steel, development was handed to Micro Forté and 14 Degrees East. In 2004, Interplay closed Black Isle Studios, and produced Fallout: Brotherhood of Steel, an action game with role-playing elements for the PlayStation 2 and Xbox. Fallout 3, the third entry in the main series, was released in 2008 by Bethesda Softworks, and was followed by Fallout: New Vegas, developed by Obsidian Entertainment and released on October 19, 2010. Fallout 4 was released in 2015, and Fallout 76 released on November 14, 2018.

Bethesda Softworks owned the rights to the Fallout intellectual property before it was acquired by Bethesda Zenimax Media, which is now the current owner. After acquiring it, Bethesda licensed the rights to make a massively multiplayer online role-playing game (MMORPG) version of Fallout to Interplay. The MMORPG got as far as beta stage under Interplay, but a prolonged legal battle between Bethesda Softworks and Interplay disrupted the development of the game, eventually resulting in its cancellation. Bethesda argued in court that Interplay had failed to fulfill the terms and conditions of the licensing contract. The case reached a resolution in early 2012.

== Origins ==
The ideas of the Fallout series began with Interplay Productions' Wasteland, released in 1988. At that time, Interplay was not a publisher and used Electronic Arts for distribution of the game. According to Interplay's founder, Brian Fargo, they wanted to explore a post-apocalyptic setting and created Wasteland for that. Sometime after release, Interplay decided to shift focus and become a publisher while still developing games. Fargo wanted to continue to use the Wasteland intellectual property but could not negotiate the rights back from Electronic Arts.

Still wanting to do something in a post-apocalyptic setting, Fargo and his team decided to make a new setting and game. They determined what aspects of Wasteland were positives and wrote and developed a new game around them. According to designer Chris Taylor, they took major inspiration from the novel A Canticle for Leibowitz (1959) and the films Mad Max 2 (1981) and The City of Lost Children (1995). The result was the first Fallout games, which were released nearly ten years after Wasteland.

== Games ==
Release timeline Main series in bold
1997	**Fallout**
1998	**Fallout 2**
1999–2000
2001	Tactics: Brotherhood of Steel
2002–2003
2004	Brotherhood of Steel
2005–2007
2008	**Fallout 3**
2009
2010	**New Vegas**
2011–2014
2015	Fallout Shelter
2015	**Fallout 4**
2016	Pinball
2017
2018	Fallout 76
2019	Shelter Online

Year	Title	Developer	Platform(s)			
Year	Title	Developer	Computer		Home console	Mobile
Main series
1997	Fallout	Interplay	Windows, MS-DOS	Classic MacOS, Mac OS X		
1998	Fallout 2	Black Isle	Windows	Classic MacOS, Mac OS X		
2008	Fallout 3	Bethesda	Windows		PS3, Xbox 360	
2010	Fallout: New Vegas	Obsidian	Windows		PS3, Xbox 360	
2015	Fallout 4	Bethesda	Windows		PS4, Xbox One, PS5, Xbox X/S, Switch 2	
TBA	Fallout 5	TBA				
Spin-offs
2001	Fallout Tactics	Micro Forté	Windows			
2004	Fallout: Brotherhood of Steel	Interplay			PS2, Xbox	
2015	Fallout Shelter	Bethesda	Windows		PS4, Xbox One, Switch	iOS, Android
2016	Fallout Pinball	Zen Studios	Windows		PS3, PS4, Switch, Xbox 360, Xbox One, Wii U	iOS, Android
2018	Fallout 76	Bethesda	Windows		PS4, Xbox One	
2019	Fallout Shelter Online	Gaea Mobile				iOS, Android
TBA	Untitled Fallout Project	Obsidian	TBA			

=== Main Series ===
==== Fallout (1997) ====
Released in October 1997, Fallout takes place in a post-apocalyptic Southern California, beginning in the year 2161. The player character, known as the Vault Dweller, is tasked with retrieving a water chip in the Wasteland to replace a malfunctioning unit in their underground shelter, Vault 13. Afterwards, the Vault Dweller must thwart the plans of a group of mutants, led by a grotesque entity named the Master. Fallout was originally intended to run under the GURPS role-playing game system. However, a disagreement with GURPS creator Steve Jackson over the game's violent content led Black Isle Studios to develop the SPECIAL system instead. The game's atmosphere and artwork draw inspiration from post–World War II American culture during the Cold War era, particularly fears of nuclear warfare in the United States.

==== Fallout 2 (1998) ====
Fallout 2 was released in October 1998, featuring several technical and gameplay improvements over the original title, including an upgraded game engine, customizable party-member behavior, and the ability to push non-player characters (NPCs) blocking doorways. The game expanded on the original's dark humor with additional pop culture references, parodies, and self-referential fourth-wall dialogue. Taking place eighty years after the events of Fallout, the narrative follows the Chosen One—the grandchild of the original Vault Dweller—on a quest to retrieve a Garden of Eden Creation Kit (GECK) to save the village of Arroyo from famine. During their journey, the Chosen One comes into direct conflict with the Enclave, the autocratic remnants of the pre-war United States government.

==== Fallout 3 (2008) ====
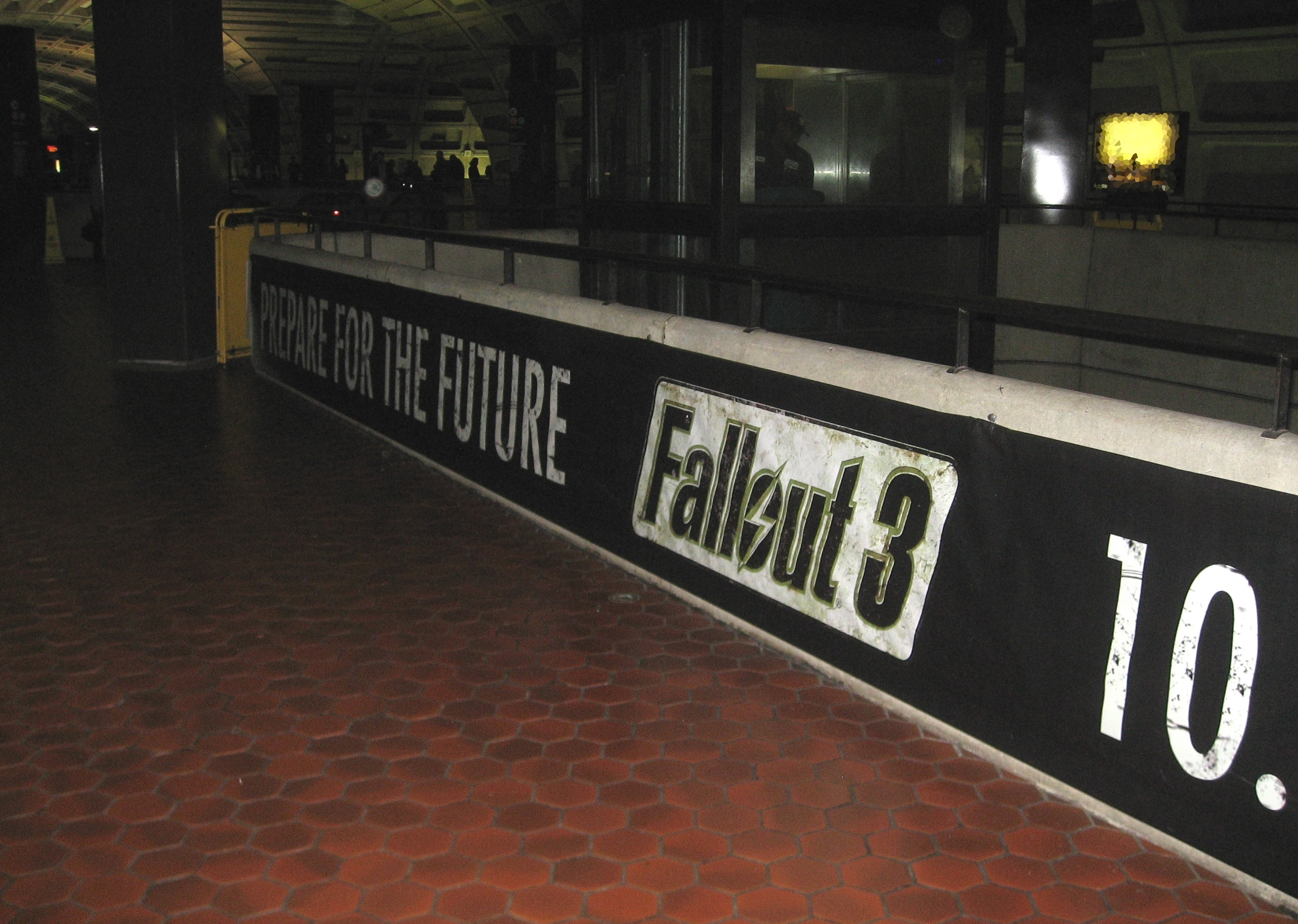
"Prepare for the Future" promotional campaign at the Metro Center station in Washington, D.C.

Fallout 3 was developed by Bethesda Game Studios and released on October 28, 2008. The story picks up thirty years after the setting of Fallout 2 and 200 years after the nuclear war that devastated the game's world. The player-character is a Vault dweller in Vault 101 who is forced to flee when the Overseer tries to arrest them in response to their father leaving the Vault. Once out, the player is dubbed the Lone Wanderer and ventures into the Wasteland in and around Washington, D.C., known as the Capital Wasteland, to find their father. It differs from previous games in the series by using 3D graphics, a free-roam gaming world, and real-time combat, in contrast to previous games' 2D isometric graphics and turn-based combat. It was developed for the PC, Xbox 360 and PlayStation 3 using the Gamebryo engine. It received highly positive reviews, garnering 94 out of 100, 92 out of 100, and 93 out of 100 averages scores on Metacritic for the PC, PS3 and Xbox 360 versions of the game, respectively. It won IGN's 2008 Overall Game of the Year Award, Xbox 360 Game of the Year, Best RPG, and Best Use of Sound, as well as E3's Best of the Show and Best Role Playing Game.

==== Fallout: New Vegas (2010) ====
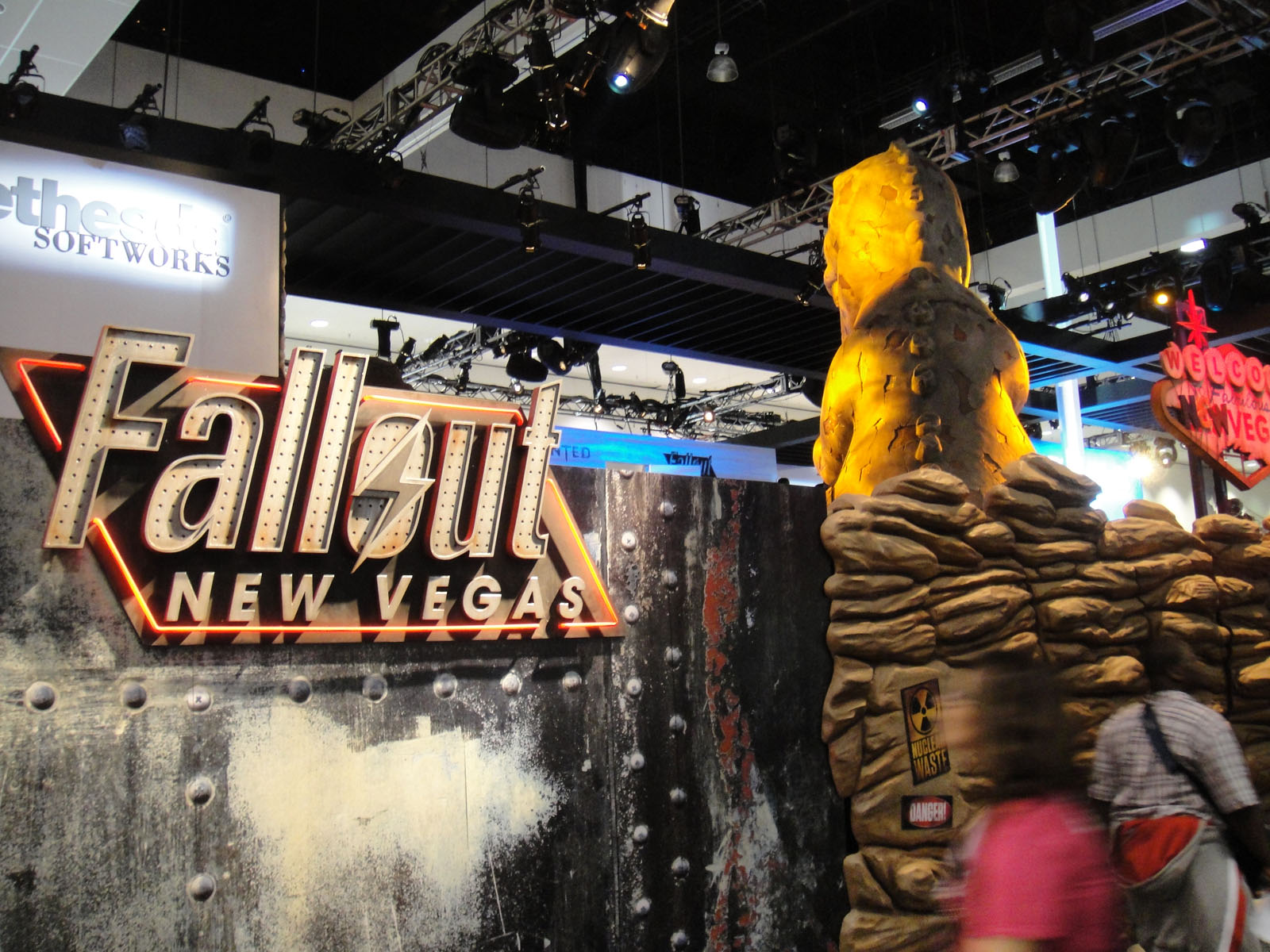
Exposition for Fallout: New Vegas at E3 2010

Fallout: New Vegas was developed by Obsidian Entertainment and released on October 19, 2010. The development team included developers who previously worked on Fallout and Fallout 2. Fallout: New Vegas is not a direct sequel to Fallout 3. Events follow four years after Fallout 3 and offer a similar experience, but no characters from that game appear. The player assumes the role of a courier in the post-apocalyptic world of the Mojave Wasteland. As the game begins, the Courier is shot in the head and left for dead shortly before being found and brought to a doctor in the nearby town of Goodsprings, marking the start of the game and the Courier's search for their would-be murderer. The city of New Vegas is a post-apocalyptic interpretation of Las Vegas.

==== Fallout 4 (2015) ====
Fallout 4, developed by Bethesda Game Studios, was released on November 10, 2015. The game was released for Microsoft Windows, PlayStation 4 and Xbox One and takes place in Boston, Massachusetts, of the in-game New England Commonwealth and features voiced protagonists. The Xbox One version has been confirmed to have mods as of 2016. Bethesda also confirmed mods for PlayStation 4, after lengthy negotiations with Sony. A virtual reality version of the game was released on December 11, 2017, available on SteamVR. Fallout 4 takes place in the year 2287, ten years after the events of Fallout 3. Fallout 4's story begins on the day the bombs dropped: October 23, 2077. The player's character (voiced by either Brian T. Delaney or Courtenay Taylor), dubbed as the Sole Survivor, takes shelter in Vault 111, emerging 210 years later, after being subjected to suspended animation. The Sole Survivor goes on a search for their son who was taken away from the Vault.

==== Fallout 5 (TBA) ====
In June 2022, Todd Howard stated in an interview that Fallout 5 would begin development after the completion of The Elder Scrolls VI, with an unspecified release window.

In July 2025, Fallout 5 was reportedly "fully greenlit," with development moving forward though the reporting outlet indicated that it remains unclear which studio (if any) is leading its production, as key studios at Bethesda were occupied with Starfield DLC and The Elder Scrolls VI at the time.

In July 2026, the game was officially announced to be in pre-production.

=== Spin-offs ===
==== Fallout Tactics: Brotherhood of Steel (2001) ====
Fallout Tactics: Brotherhood of Steel is the first Fallout game not to require the player to fight in a turn-based mode, and the first to allow the player to customize the skills, perks, and combat actions of the rest of the party. Fallout Tactics focuses on tactical combat rather than role-playing; the new combat system included different modes, stances, and modifiers, but the player had no dialogue options. Most of the criticisms of the game came from its incompatibility with the story of the original two games, not from its gameplay. Fallout Tactics includes a multiplayer mode that allows players to compete against squads of other characters controlled by other players. Unlike the previous two games, which are based in California, Fallout Tactics takes place in the Midwestern United States. The game was released in early 2001 to generally favorable reviews. In 2020, Emil Pagliarulo stated that elements and lore from Fallout Tactics have been used in Bethesda Softworks' subsequent entries in the series.

==== Fallout: Brotherhood of Steel (2004) ====
Fallout: Brotherhood of Steel became the first Fallout game for consoles when it was released in 2004. It follows an initiate in the Brotherhood of Steel who is given a suicidal quest to find several lost Brotherhood Paladins. Brotherhood of Steel is an action role-playing game, representing a significant break from previous incarnations of the Fallout series in both gameplay and aesthetics. The game does not feature non-player characters that accompany the player in combat and uses heavy metal music, including Slipknot, Devin Townsend, and Killswitch Engage, which stands in contrast to the music of the earlier Fallout games, performed by The Ink Spots, The Mills Brothers, and Louis Armstrong. It was the last Fallout game developed by Interplay.

==== Fallout Shelter (2015) ====
Fallout Shelter is a simulation game for Microsoft Windows, iOS, Android, Xbox One, PlayStation 4 and Nintendo Switch. The player acts as the Overseer, building and managing their Vault and its dwellers, sending them into the Wasteland on scouting missions and defending the Vault from attacks. Unlike the main entries in the franchise, this game has no ending and mostly revolves around attempting to keep the people who live in the vault, an intricate fallout shelter, alive. The game uses microtransactions, a form of in-game purchases, that take the form of Nuka-Cola quantum, the game's "premium" currency; lunch boxes, an item that would give a random mixture of in-game items; pet carriers, something that would contain a pet, which can boost a single dweller's stats; and "Mister Handys" or "Snip-Snips" (same thing different skin), robots who can harvest the games materials or be assigned to outside the vault to harvest bottle caps, the game's currency. Fallout Shelter was released for iOS on June 14, 2015, Android on August 13, 2015, and for PC on July 15, 2016. On February 7, 2017, Bethesda launched Fallout Shelter on Xbox One. On June 10, 2018, Bethesda announced and launched Fallout Shelter on Nintendo Switch and PlayStation 4.

==== Fallout Pinball (2016) ====
In late 2016, Zen Studios developed a virtual pinball game based on the Fallout universe as part of the Bethesda Pinball collection, which became available as part of Zen Pinball 2, Pinball FX 2 and Pinball FX 3, as well as a separate free-to-play app for iOS and Android mobile devices. The pinball adaptation is based on Fallout 4 while containing elements from previous installments as well.

==== Fallout 76 (2018) ====
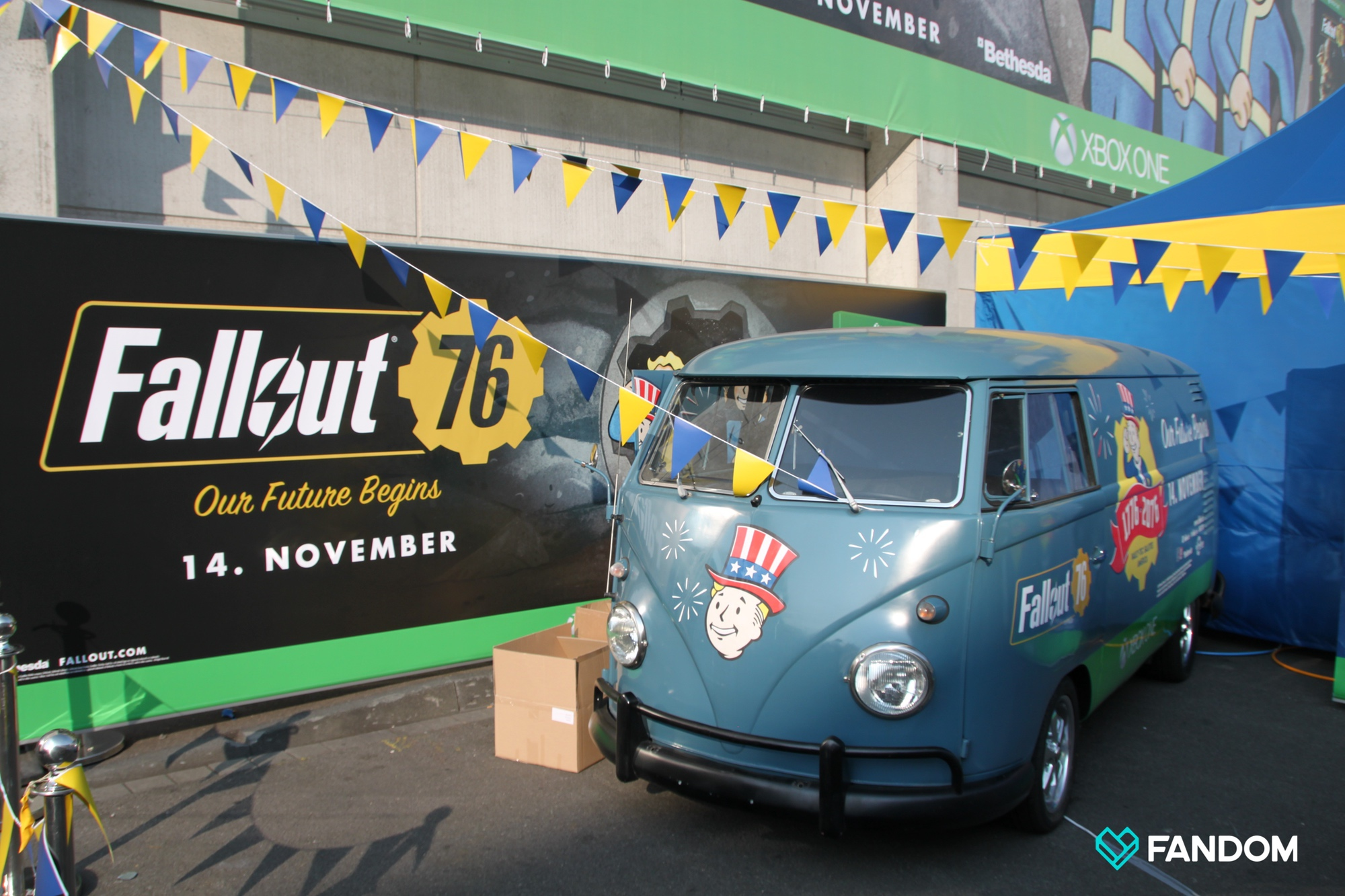
"Our Future Begins" promotion for Fallout 76 at Gamescom 2018

Fallout 76 is the first online multiplayer game in the franchise. It is set in West Virginia, with a majority of monsters and enemies based on regional folklore. When the game was originally released, there were no human non-player characters, although it received NPCs and character dialogue with the "Wastelanders" update. It was released for Microsoft Windows, PlayStation 4, and Xbox One on November 14, 2018.

==== Fallout Shelter Online (2019) ====
Fallout Shelter Online is a sequel to Fallout Shelter developed by Chinese company Gaea Mobile. It expands on the original games' mechanics while also introducing multiplayer capabilities such as PvP and the ability to play online, as well as gacha mechanics. It was released in June 2019 exclusively in China. On March 18, 2020, pre-registration for Indonesia, Malaysia, Philippines, Thailand, Singapore, South Korea, and Japan was opened. On June 1, 2020, it was released in the former territories on iOS and Android devices.

==== Untitled second Obsidian Entertainment game ====
In July 2026, it was reported that Obsidian Entertainment had been shifted towards prioritizing a new Fallout game succeeding New Vegas over other projects by parent company Xbox. Director and designer Josh Sawyer will also return to lead the project after previously doing so on New Vegas.

On July 17, Bethesda and Obsidian officially announced the collaboration, as well as remasters of Fallout 3 and New Vegas.

=== Tabletop games ===
==== Fallout: Warfare (2001) ====
Fallout: Warfare is a tabletop wargame based on the Fallout Tactics storyline, using a simplified version of the SPECIAL system. The rulebook was written by Christopher Taylor, and was available on the Fallout Tactics bonus CD, together with cut-out miniatures. Fallout: Warfare features five distinct factions, vehicles, four game types and 33 different units. The rules only require ten-sided dice. The modifications to the SPECIAL system allow every unit a unique set of stats and give special units certain skills they can use, including piloting, doctor, and repair. A section of the Fallout: Warfare manual allows campaigns to be conducted using the Warfare rules.

==== Fallout: The Board Game (2017) ====
Fallout: The Board Game was announced by Fantasy Flight Games on August 8, 2017. In Fallout: The Board Game, up to one to four players are able to explore the locations of Fallout 3, Fallout 4 and their associated downloadable content. Pre-orders were opened on October 2, 2017. It was released and made available to purchase online and at retailers on November 30, 2017.

An expansion titled Fallout: New California was announced on July 13, 2018, which explores the area of New California featured in Fallout and Fallout 2. Pre-orders were opened on October 2, 2018. It was released and made available to purchase online and at retailers on October 25, 2018.

==== Fallout: Wasteland Warfare (2018) ====
The tabletop wargame Fallout: Wasteland Warfare was announced by Modiphius Entertainment in April 2017. It was released in March 2018.

A virtual tabletop version was released on Fantasy Grounds April 26, 2022.

==== Fallout: The Roleplaying Game (2021) ====
The tabletop role-playing game Fallout: The Roleplaying Game, also by Modiphius Entertainment, was released digitally on March 31, 2021. The game features a modified version of the SPECIAL system, including the seven SPECIAL stats, skills, tag skills, and perks. Its core mechanic is Modiphius's "2d20" system, a dice pool system in which any given action is resolved by rolling two twenty-sided dice and counting the number of "successes", which are any result equal to or below the character's combined SPECIAL attribute plus their skill rank for a particular action. Players can roll additional dice by spending "Action Points", a resource shared by all active players in the game, which are generated and spent continuously over the course of a game session.

The game's default setting is the Commonwealth, the same as in Fallout 4, at the same period in time. Flavor text throughout the rulebook describe characters featured in Fallout 4 and suggest that events are set to occur the same way they are at the beginning of the videogame, such as the arrival of the Prydwen airship. The rulebook contains descriptions of locations, fictional corporations, factions, and events specific to the default greater Boston area. Support for regions that appeared in other Fallout videogames, such as New California, Midwest, Capital Wasteland, Mojave Wasteland or the Appalachia, were not included in the core rulebook.

On May 13, 2020, a supplement-sized questbook expansion titled Winter of Atom was announced. The expansion is set within the Commonwealth before the events of Fallout 4 during a harsh winter, with the conflict involving defending settlements against the Last Son of Atom, the leader of a rogue sect of the Children of Atom. Four new factions are also introduced, as well as additional player character origins for Synth, Protectron and Child of Atom players. Physical pre-orders for Winter of Atom were opened in May 2023, which included a digital copy in PDF form upon purchasing. Physical copies were slated to ship in July 2023.

==== Magic: The Gathering: Fallout (2024) ====
A set of four pre-constructed decks for Magic: The Gathering based on all previous Fallout video games was released by Wizards of the Coast under license from Bethesda on March 8, 2024, as part of the Universes Beyond program of cross-over Magic products. These decks were designed for the Commander format of multiplayer Magic and represent different factions: Survivors, Legions, Scientists, and Mutants. The set contains a total of 146 new cards, representing characters, equipment, vaults, and other elements of the Fallout games, along with reprints of older cards all with new art depicting the post-apocalyptic setting.

==== Fallout Factions (2024) ====
The tabletop skirmishing wargame, Fallout Factions, was announced by Modiphius Entertainment on September 10, 2022, during their online event, ModCon 2022. The game's first release, Fallout Factions: Nuka World, is played using miniatures of three Raider gangs: the Operators, the Pack, and the Disciples, which were originally introduced in Fallout 4's Nuka-World add-on. The game's miniatures were also announced to be compatible with Fallout: Wasteland Warfare. On September 15, 2023, it was announced via newsletter that the game would be released in 2024.

==== Fallout Power Play ====
Fallout: Power Play is a card game released by Modiphius Entertainment in January 2026. It is advertised as a competitive card game for 2–4 players where players can control of one of four iconic Factions, Brotherhood of Steel, Enclave, Raiders, and Super Mutants. Players must use unique cards to battle your friends and other enemies the game throws your way.

=== Cancelled games ===
==== Fallout Extreme ====
Fallout Extreme was in development for several months in 2000 but was canceled before leaving the concept stage. It was intended to be a squad-based, first and third-person tactical shooter to be released on Xbox and built on Unreal Engine.

==== Fallout Tactics 2 ====
Fallout Tactics 2 was proposed as a sequel to Fallout Tactics: Brotherhood of Steel, although it was originally conceived as a sequel to Wasteland, the video game that inspired the Fallout series. It was developed by Micro Forté, but the production was canceled in December 2001 after the poor sales of Fallout Tactics.

==== Van Buren, Black Isle Studios' Fallout 3 ====
Van Buren is the codename for the canceled version of Fallout 3 developed by Black Isle Studios and to be published by Interplay Entertainment. It featured an improved engine with 3D graphics as opposed to sprites, new locations, vehicles, and a modified version of the SPECIAL system. The story disconnected from the Vault Dweller/Chosen One bloodline in Fallout and Fallout 2. Plans for the game included the ability to influence the various factions. The game was canceled in December 2003 when budget cuts forced Interplay to dismiss the PC development team. Interplay subsequently sold the Fallout intellectual property to Bethesda Softworks, who began development on their own version of Fallout 3 unrelated to Van Buren. Main parts of the game were incorporated into Fallout 3 and its add-ons as well as Fallout: New Vegas.

==== Fallout: Brotherhood of Steel 2 ====
Fallout: Brotherhood of Steel 2 is the canceled sequel to Brotherhood of Steel. The development of the game started before the completion of the original, and its development caused the cancellation of the Van Buren project. Like its predecessor, the game would have used the Dark Alliance Engine. It featured fourteen new weapons and ten new enemies. The game would have used a simplified reputation system based on previous entries; depending on whether the player was good or evil, the game would play out differently. Each of the four characters that were playable had a different fighting style, therefore every new play-through would have been a different experience. It had two player co-op action for players to experience the game with their friends. The Dark Alliance Engine would be fleshed out to refine player experience. A new stealth system would have been added to the game. This system would have allowed players to stalk enemies or stealthily assassinate them with a sniper rifle. For characters that could not use the sniper rifle, Interplay added a turret mode allowing those characters to use turrets.

While the main quest of the game would have been linear, how the player reach the conclusion would have been their choice. The main character would have been a Latino girl named Lilith, who was said to have a short temper with short black hair, green eyes and a sexy body. She would have worn a sports bra and jeans. Three other characters would be Maxus, the son of Cyrus, and Jaffe, a Brotherhood R&D worker who was pulled from duty due to Brotherhood/NCR tensions. Scarlet is a character that is completely albino, was raised by Harold, and inspired by the stories of Dweller, the main character of the original Fallout.

==== Fallout Online ====
Fallout Online (previously known as Project V13) is a canceled project by Interplay and Masthead Studios to develop a Fallout-themed massively multiplayer online game. It entered production in 2008. In 2009, Bethesda filed a lawsuit against Interplay regarding Project V13, claiming that Interplay has violated their agreement as development had not yet begun on the project. On January 2, 2012, Bethesda and Interplay reached a settlement, the terms of which include the cancellation of Fallout Online and transfer of all rights in the franchise to Bethesda. In December 2012, a newly reformed Black Isle Studios attempted to re-launch the project as a single-player RPG independent of the Fallout brand. An announcement posted to their website described Project V13 as a strategy RPG in which players would discover and rebuild a "colony" by recruiting NPCs to perform various job roles and embarking on adventures to gather resources. The announcement launched a crowdfunding campaign intended to fund a proof-of-concept prototype that would demonstrate most if not all of the game's systems to potential investors. Backers would be granted access to private forum discussions meant to solicit feedback on development decisions and eventually early access to a beta test of Project V13. The campaign raised over $6,000, but a prototype never materialized. Communication from Black Isle Studios about the project ceased in 2014.

== Gameplay ==
=== S.P.E.C.I.A.L ===
"S.P.E.C.I.A.L" is a character creation and statistics system developed for use in the Fallout series. It is an acronym, representing the seven attributes used to define characters': Strength, Perception, Endurance, Charisma, Intelligence, Agility and Luck. S.P.E.C.I.A.L is heavily based on GURPS, which was originally intended to be the character system used in the game.

The S.P.E.C.I.A.L system involves the following sets of key features:

- Attributes (listed above) represent a character's core, innate abilities. Attributes stay largely constant throughout the game, though they can be temporarily affected by drugs, altered indefinitely by conditions such as the usage of Power Armor, the presence of certain NPCs, eye damage received from a critical hit, or permanently changed at certain points in the game through use of certain items or perks.
- Skills represent a character's chance of successfully performing a group of specific tasks (such as firing a gun, or picking a lock). They are represented as percentages, though these percentages can extend well beyond the expected maximum of 100%, at increased cost for skills over 100%. The SPECIAL stats continually add bonuses to skills. This is done passively, i.e. if the SPECIAL stats change, the bonuses are automatically and instantly adjusted. Skill Points that are earned each time the character levels up can be used to raise skill percentage. At character creation, the player selects three "tag skills"—skills which can be increased at multiples of the normal rate, starting at one skill point per 2% skill at under 101% skill.

The S.P.E.C.I.A.L system was used in Fallout, Fallout 2, and Fallout Tactics: Brotherhood of Steel. A modified version of the system was used in Fallout 3, Fallout: New Vegas, Fallout 4, Fallout 76 and Fallout Shelter.

Aside from Fallout games, modified versions of S.P.E.C.I.A.L were also used in Lionheart: Legacy of the Crusader (also referred to as Fallout Fantasy early in production), a fantasy role-playing video game that involved spirits and magic in addition to the traditional SPECIAL features, as well as the canceled project Black Isle's Torn.

=== The Pip-Boy and Vault Boy ===
The Fallout series' aesthetic is represented in the user interface of the Pip-Boy computer, and the frequent occurrences of the Vault Boy character, illustrating perks and mechanics.

The Pip-Boy (Personal Information Processor-Boy) is a wrist-computer given to the player early in Fallout, Fallout 2, Fallout 3, Fallout: New Vegas, Fallout 4, and Fallout 76 which serves various roles in quest, inventory, and battle management, as well as presenting player statistics. The model present in Fallout and Fallout 2 is identified as a Pip-Boy 2000, and both games feature the same unit, used first by the Vault Dweller and later inherited by the Chosen One. Fallout Tactics contains a modified version of the 2000 model, called Pip-Boy 2000BE, while Fallout 3 and Fallout: New Vegas uses a Pip-Boy 3000. Fallout: New Vegas has a golden version of it, called the Pimp-Boy 3 Billion that is given to the player as a reward for completing a quest in a certain way. Fallout 4 contains a modified version of the 3000, called the Pip-Boy 3000 Mark IV. Fallout 76 contains a modified version of the Pip-Boy, called the Pip-Boy 2000 Mark VI, which is another version of the Pip-Boy 2000.

The Vault Boy character is Vault-Tec's mascot, and is a recurring element in Vault-Tec products in the game world. This includes the Pip-Boy, where the Vault Boy illustrates all of the character statistics and selectable attributes. From Bethesda's Fallout 3 onward Vault Boy models all of the clothing and weaponry as well. The character was originally designed by Leonard Boyarsky, based partly on Rich Uncle Pennybags' aesthetic from the Monopoly board game.

=== Power armor ===
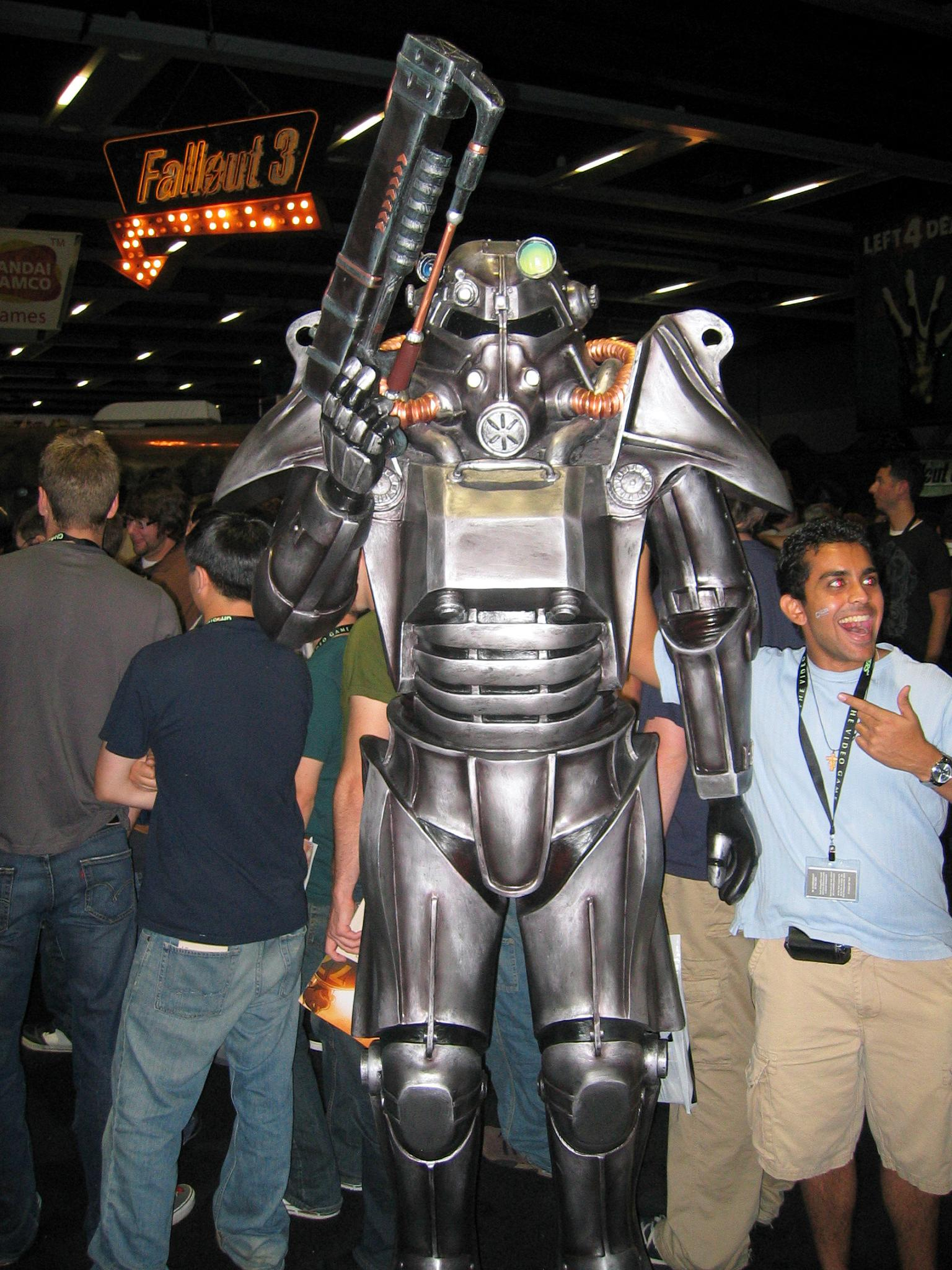
A replica of T-45 power armor, which first appears and is prominently featured in Fallout 3

Powered combat infantry armor, or power armor, is a type of powered exoskeleton featured in every game in the Fallout series. It allows for protection from enemy fire and enables the wearer to carry extremely heavy weapons and other objects with ease. It is considered an iconic part of the Fallout universe, an effective marketing tool for a faceless protagonist, and a prominent symbol within the game's lore.

The final design of the power armor in the original Fallout was created by artist Leonard Boyarsky from a helmet rendering made to showcase "something more detailed to show (on) the cover and in the cinematics" of the game. The design of the helmet and eyepiece was stated by Cain to be partly inspired by the film The City of Lost Children, with its "tubing and vents" serving as "very inspirational" to the overall aesthetic of the game. Leonard Boyarsky stated that he was inspired by the "very industrial...very hardcore mechanical" design of the helmet and "loved it so much" that he revised the initial in-game design of the power armor to reflect the concept art that he had made.

The power armor's recurring appearances in subsequent titles following the acquisition of the Fallout intellectual property by Bethesda Softworks represents a crucial visual motif used to establish continuity with earlier works in the franchise. Lead art director Istvan Pely stated that the power armor was the first asset developed for Fallout 3 because the "iconic element of the series...seemed like a great place to start" and was a "useful exercise in finding a balance between staying true to the original game's vibe and introducing a fresh aesthetic for the new game".

In earlier Fallout games, power armor was depicted as sizeable and imposing powered combat suits that substantially increased the physical stature of the occupant. In Fallout 3 and Fallout: New Vegas, power armor is depicted as symmetrical in height and width to regular apparel in gameplay due to engine limitations. This change was poorly received by many critics and fans, who felt that power armor no longer lived up to its reputation as large and formidable powered exoskeleton suits that greatly enhanced the physical capabilities and endurance of the wearer. PCGamesN reported a fan-created mod called Titans of The New West 2.0 for Fallout: New Vegas, which introduced aesthetic changes to the game's power armor design expressly intended to mirror the original design philosophy of power armor from Fallout, Fallout 2, and Fallout Tactics by adding custom models, animations, and sound effects to reflect their height, weight and heft, along with optional gameplay enhancements when using power armor. Evan Lafleuriel observed that New Vegas is the only game in the series to eschew the use of power armor to advertise the game, which did not leave a lasting impression in his view.

In Fallout 4, power armor is notably more heavily integrated into gameplay, with suits becoming customizable, interactable objects in the game world that the player climbs into rather than typical clothing and requiring fusion cores to use. The studio initially began a "reimagining" of the classic design during the development of Fallout 4 but created a new and revised design that was "bigger, more imposing, more realistic and fully functional" to create the impression of the power armor feeling less like a suit and more like a vehicle that a player would operate, which resonated with some commentators of Fallout 4. In addition, players are capable of creating collections of power armor in concert with the game's base-building features.

==== Lore ====
Within series lore, it was developed before the Great War by a group of United States defense contractors called West Tek in response for the need for a "walking tank" for the United States mechanized cavalry. From 2065 to 2067, several failed prototypes were created, though this research led to the creation of a compact fusion cell. The fusion cells worsened relations with China, which was already facing an energy crisis due to over-dependence on fossil fuels. China soon invades Alaska, and the Power Armor is deployed in 2067, proving extremely effective in battle. The pinnacle of Power Armor technology was achieved in 2077, with units capable of cutting a swath through the Chinese forces. Their success on the battlefield ultimately prompts the Great War, a last-ditch nuclear exchange between America and China later in 2077 that annihilates most of modern civilization, save for irradiated ghouls and those sheltering in the Vault Network.

The 2019 publication Fallout: A Tale of Mutation explained that within the context of series lore, the Power Armor represents pre-war North American power, since every battle against the Chinese was fought by soldiers wearing the armor. Additionally, it is a reminder of how powerless the United States was to prevent its destruction at the hands of nuclear weapons.

Post-war, Power Armor is most widely used by the Brotherhood of Steel, a cult-like organization that collects and preserves technology.

==== Merchandise ====
A Power Armor figurine made by Japanese toymaker ThreeZero was released in 2016 for nearly $400 (~$537.00 in 2025). A $200 version of Fallout 76 known as the Power Armor Edition was bundled with a replica Power Armor helmet. While its appearance was praised as "top notch", aspects such as the paint job and voice box were criticized as "cheap", and the visor as difficult to see through. While not part of the Power Armor Edition, red "Nuka-Cola" helmets sold at GameStop were recalled due to mold contamination, said to be part of a "comedy of errors" surrounding the game's release.

== Series overview ==
=== Setting ===
Fallout's U.S. flag shown here is inspired by the Cowpens flag, but with the center star enlarged to represent the nation as a whole.

Logo of the Nuka-Cola Corporation

The series is set in a fictionalized United States in an alternate history scenario that diverges from reality after 1945, following World War II. In this alternative atompunk "golden age," vacuum tubes and atomic physics serve as the foundations of scientific progress, while transistors are not as scientifically crucial in this world. (Note: A popular myth is that the transistor was never invented throughout the series; the developers have debunked this myth.) As such, a bizarre socio-technological status quo emerges, in which advanced robots, nuclear-powered cars, directed-energy weapons, and other futuristic technologies are seen alongside 1950s-era computers and televisions. The United States divides itself into 13 commonwealths, and the aesthetics and Cold War paranoia of the 1950s continue to dominate American life well into the 21st century.

More than a hundred years before the start of the series, an energy crisis emerged as a result of oil depletion, leading to a period called the "Resource Wars" starting in April 2052 — a series of events caused by global resource scarcity which included a war between the European Commonwealth and the Middle Eastern states (2053–2060) which led to the collapse of both regions, the disbanding of the United Nations (July 26, 2052), the U.S. invasion of Mexico (2051), and hostile annexation of Canada (2072). A Chinese invasion and subsequent military occupation of Alaska in 2066 led to the decade-long "Sino-American War" (2066–2077) between China and the U.S., coupled with the emergence of a disease known as the "New Plague" (2053) that devastated the American mainland. As global situations worsened, the American government became increasingly jingoistic and authoritarian (2000s–2077), going as far as having political dissidents and Chinese-American citizens arrested and sent off to re-education camps where they were tortured, and even experimented on. By 2077, the tension between the United States and China had grown to critical levels as the U.S. retook Alaska and invaded mainland China, eventually culminating in the "Great War" on the morning of October 23, 2077, eastern daylight time, a two-hour long global nuclear exchange on an apocalyptic scale, which subsequently created the post-apocalyptic United States, the setting of the Fallout world.

=== Vaults ===
Logo of the Vault-Tec Corporation

Having foreseen this outcome decades earlier, the U.S. government began a nationwide project in 2054 to build fallout shelters known as "Vaults." The Vaults were ostensibly designed by the Vault-Tec Corporation as public shelters, each able to support up to a thousand people. Around 400,000 Vaults would have been needed, but only 122 were commissioned and constructed. Each Vault is self-sufficient, so it could theoretically sustain its inhabitants indefinitely. However, the Vault project was not intended as a viable way to repopulate the United States in the event of such deadly events. Instead, most Vaults were secret, unethical social experiments and were designed to determine the effects of different environmental and psychological conditions on their inhabitants. Seventeen control Vaults were made to function as advertised, in contrast with the Vault experiments. Still, they were usually shoddy and unreliable, as most funding went to the experimental ones. Many Vaults remained sealed as part of their respective experiments even after the radiation had reached safe levels. The true purpose of the Vaults' experiments was so that Enclave could collect the data gathered from the experiments and use it to build a spaceship and find a new planet for them to colonize.

Experiments were widely varied and included: a Vault filled with clones of an individual (Vault 108); a Vault where its residents were frozen in suspended animation (Vault 111); a Vault where its residents were exposed to psychoactive drugs (Vault 106); a Vault where they are instructed to sacrifice one inhabitant each year (Vault 11); a Vault with only one man and a crate full of hand puppets (Vault 77); a Vault where its inhabitants were segregated into two hostile factions (Vault 19); two Vaults with disproportionate ratios of men and women (Vaults 68 and 69); a Vault where the door never fully closed, exposing the inhabitants to the dangerous nuclear fallout (Vault 12); a Vault with limited space where all its dwellers had access to firearms (Vault 34); a deliberately overcrowded Vault (Vault 27), and several Vaults where the inhabitants were exposed to the mutagenic Forced Evolutionary Virus (F.E.V.), creating posthuman and human/animal hybrid mutants including the monstrous Super Mutants — Vault 87 is the main Vault for this category. Ultimately, many of the experiments had disastrous results, usually leading to their derailment and the Vault's collapse. After abandonment, raiders, Super Mutants, or other mutated creatures occupied several Vaults.

=== Postwar conditions ===
In the years following the Great War, the United States devolved into a post-apocalyptic environment commonly referred to as "the Wasteland." The Great War and subsequent nuclear Armageddon had severely depopulated the country, leaving large expanses of property decaying from neglect. In addition, virtually all food and water are irradiated, and most lifeforms have mutated due to high radiation combined with mutagens of varied origins. Despite the large-scale devastation, some areas were fortunate enough to survive the nuclear apocalypse relatively unscathed, even possessing non-irradiated water, flora, and fauna. However, these areas are exceedingly rare. With much of the country's infrastructure in ruins, basic necessities are scarce. Barter is a common method of exchange, with bottle caps serving as a more conventional form of currency. Most cities and towns are empty, having been looted or deserted in favor of smaller, makeshift communities scattered around the Wasteland.

Many humans who could not get into the Vaults but survived the atomic blasts, affected by the radiation, turned into so-called "ghouls." While their lifespans are greatly extended, their bodies develop widespread necrosis or rot; many lose their hair, their voices take on a raspy tone, and otherwise have permanently deformed physical features. Ghouls often resent normal human beings, either out of jealousy or in response to discrimination. Ghouls typically resent any comparison to zombies, and being called a zombie is viewed as a great insult. Ghouls who continue to be exposed to high radiation levels can have their brains experience irreversible damage, causing them to become "feral" and attack almost anything on sight, having lost their minds.

Creatures known as "Deathclaws" roam the wilderness. Humans deliberately created them as biological weapons before the Great War. After escaping into the wild, they thrived in the nuclear wasteland, becoming apex predators. Known as one of the Fallout series' most recognizable and iconic elements, Deathclaws were praised by critics for their design and the fear they induce in the player due to their immense power. As a result of their popularity, numerous mods were created for Fallout series games with the Deathclaw as a central theme, either to tame the creatures as a pet or use them in combat, concepts which were later added as an official feature.

Various factions of humans would later form in the Wasteland, with five of the most prominent being the Brotherhood of Steel, the New California Republic (NCR), the Enclave, Caesar's Legion, and the Institute:

- The Brotherhood came together when a group of soldiers led by U.S. Army Captain Roger Maxson started a mutiny after finding out about the Forced Evolutionary Virus experiments. Declaring themselves independent from the U.S. government, their rebellion never got off the ground because of the outbreak of the Great War. The defectors, safe in the underground confines of the Mariposa Military Base, emerged, reconnected with other survivors, and headed to the Lost Hills bunker to start anew.

Flag of the New California Republic

- The NCR was formed by a group of Vault 15 dwellers who would go on to found the town of Shady Sands in 2142. Over time, under the leadership of their elder, Aradesh, and his daughter, Tandi, Shady Sands became a major economic power in the southwest. They united with other major hubs of civilization in the area to found the New California Republic.

Symbol of the Enclave

- The Enclave was a secret cabal of wealthy industrialists, military personnel, and influential politicians who operated in the shadows and exerted a significant degree of control over the United States' government. This enigmatic alliance of private interests eventually subverted and developed from the continuity of government protocol to ensure its survival as the real United States, laying claim to the North American mainland.

Flag of Caesar's Legion

- Caesar's Legion was an imperialistic slaver society and totalitarian dictatorship founded in 2247 by Edward Sallow, a former citizen of the NCR, built on the conquest and enslavement of tribal societies and lording over subjects of civilized settlements in the American Southwest. To enforce unity, the Legion loosely models itself after the Roman Empire's military, repurposing its language and aesthetics for the post-apocalypse.

Symbol of the Institute

- The Institute is a reclusive scientific society comprising various intellectuals and mechanists descended from the staff of the Massachusetts Institute of Technology. Emerging as a major post-war power in the 2200s, the Institute considers itself a bastion of knowledge and prosperity amid a dying world, developing numerous revolutionary and advanced technologies. The Synths, androids that resemble humans almost exactly, stand at the forefront of the Institute's scientific achievements, working to benefit the organization's goals by inserting themselves into major post-war factions.

Various raider gangs also formed, such as the Jackals, Vipers, and Khans, which originated from Vault 15, the same Vault that founded Shady Sands and the New California Republic.

=== Influences ===
Fallout satirizes the 1950s' and 1960s' fantasies of the United States' "post-nuclear-war-survival", thus draws from 1950s pulp magazine science fiction and superhero comic books, all rooted in Atomic Age optimism of a nuclear-powered future, though gone terribly awry by the time the events of the game take place. The technology is retro-futuristic, with various Raygun Gothic machines such as laser weaponry and boxy Forbidden Planet-style robots. Computers use vacuum tubes instead of transistors (of which only a few exist), the architecture of ruined buildings feature Art Deco, Streamline Moderne, and Googie designs, direct-energy weapons resemble those used by Flash Gordon, and what few vehicles remain in the world are all 1950s-styled. Fallout's other production designs, such as menu interfaces, are similarly designed to resemble advertisements and toys of the Atomic Age. Advertising in the game, such as billboards and brochures, has a distinct 1950s motif and feel. The lack of retro stylization was a common source of criticism in spin-off games, as was the inclusion of modern features in weapons and other models.

A major influence was A Boy and His Dog, where the main character Vic and his dog Blood scavenge the desert of the Southwestern United States, stealing for a living and evading bands of marauders, berserk androids, and mutants. It "inspired Fallout on many levels, from underground communities of survivors to glowing mutants." Other film influences include the Mad Max series, with its depiction of a post-apocalyptic wasteland. In the first game, one of the first available armors is a one-sleeved leather jacket that resembles the jacket worn in Mad Max 2.

== Other media ==
=== Canceled films ===
In 1998, Interplay Entertainment founded the film division Interplay Films to make films based on its properties, and announced that a Fallout film was one of their first projects, along adaptations of Descent and Redneck Rampage. In 2000, Interplay confirmed that a film based on the original Fallout game was in production with Mortal Kombat Annihilation screenwriter Brent V. Friedman attached to write a film treatment and with Dark Horse Entertainment attached to produce it. The division was later disbanded without any film produced, but Friedman's treatment was leaked on the Internet in 2011.

In 2009, Bethesda Softworks expressed its interest in producing a Fallout film. After four extensions of the trademark without any use, Bethesda filed a "Statement of Use" with the USPTO in January 2012. In the next month, instead of a Fallout film, a special feature was made, entitled "Making of Fallout 3 DVD", which was accepted as a film on March 27 of the same year. This action removed the requirement to continue to re-register that mark indefinitely. In the DVD commentary of Mutant Chronicles, voice actor Ron Perlman stated that if a Fallout film was made, he would like to reprise his role as the Narrator. In 2016, Todd Howard stated that Bethesda had turned down the offers of making a film based on Fallout, but that he did not rule out the possibility.

=== Television series ===
A Fallout television series based on the franchise was announced in July 2020 for Amazon Prime Video. The series was written, created and executive produced by Lisa Joy and Jonathan Nolan. In January 2022, Amazon officially moved forward with the series, with Nolan directing the pilot episode and Geneva Robertson-Dworet and Graham Wagner joining as showrunners. Filming was completed on March 28, 2023. The show is canonical to the games, with its 2296 setting, making it the furthest along the timeline in the franchise. Ella Purnell and Walton Goggins were cast in lead roles as an inexperienced vault dweller venturing to the surface and a ghoul mercenary, respectively. The series premiered its first season, consisting of eight episodes, on April 10, 2024. Later that month, the series was renewed for a second season, which premiered on December 16, 2025. In May 2025, ahead of the second-season premiere, the series was renewed for a third season.

=== The Vault Dweller's Official Cookbook ===
The Vault Dweller's Official Cookbook contains recipes for food items found within the Fallout universe, such as Nuka-Cola, BlamCo Mac N' Cheese, and various others. It was written by Victoria Rosenthal, and was published on October 23, 2018, to coincide with the release of Fallout 76, and the in-game date of the Great War.

=== Fortnite: Battle Royale ===
The T-60 Power Armor appeared in Fortnite, in the Battle Royale gamemode, as a cosmetic outfit in the Chapter 5 Season 3 Battle Pass, alongside a pickaxe tool attaining to the Assaultron, an emote depicting a Mister Handy robot, and many other cosmetic items bearing reference to the series. Nuka Cola also appeared as a consumable, as did the laser rifle as an in-game weapon, in a later update.

=== Super Smash Bros Ultimate ===
During the summer of 2020, the mascot of Vault-Tec, Vault Boy, appeared as a Mii Gunner costume for the Nintendo Switch title Super Smash Bros. Ultimate.

=== Call of Duty ===
On June 18, 2024, Activision announced a collaboration between the Call of Duty franchise and Fallout, which saw the addition of a cosmetic bundle for purchase in Call of Duty: Modern Warfare III and Call of Duty: Warzone. The bundle contains "Vault 141" outfits for four operator characters Soap, Price, Ghost, and Gaz, in addition to Vault-themed weapon skins and other items based on Fallout. The bundle was released on June 20, 2024, in addition to a free in-game event where players can earn other Fallout-themed cosmetic items, including a Nuka-Cola Quantum weapon camouflage.

A second collaboration, themed around the television series, was announced in December 2025 for Call of Duty: Black Ops 7. The collaboration featured the addition of the characters Lucy, The Ghoul and Maximus as playable operators in Black Ops 7, as well as Fallout-themed limited-time game modes and maps, such as a multiplayer mode where killed players respawn as feral ghouls.

=== Trading card game ===
In 2025, Wizards of the Coast released sets based on Fallout for Magic: The Gathering as part of its Universes Beyond collaborations.

== Reception and legacy ==
Aggregate review scores
Game	Year	Metacritic
Fallout	1997	89/100
Fallout 2	1998	86/100
Fallout Tactics: Brotherhood of Steel	2001	82/100
Fallout: Brotherhood of Steel	2004	PS2: 64/100; XBOX: 66/100
Fallout 3	2008	PC: 91/100; PS3: 90/100; X360: 93/100
Fallout: New Vegas	2010	PC: 84/100; PS3: 82/100; X360: 84/100
Fallout Shelter	2015	71/100
Fallout 4	2015	PC: 84/100; PS4: 87/100; XONE: 88/100
Fallout 76	2018	PC: 52/100; PS4: 53/100; XONE: 49/100

The Fallout series has been met with mostly positive reception. The highest rated title is Fallout 3 and the lowest is Fallout 76 according to review aggregator Metacritic.

=== Controversy and fandom ===
Some fans have expressed dismay at the direction the Fallout series has taken since its acquisition by Bethesda Softworks. Notable for their vehement support of the series' first two games, Fallout and Fallout 2, members centered around one of the oldest Fallout fansites, No Mutants Allowed, have complained over departures from the original games' stories, gameplay mechanics and setting. Minor criticisms include the prevalence of unspoiled food after 200 years, the survival of wood-framed dwellings after a nuclear blast, and the ubiquity of Super Mutants at early levels in the game. More serious criticisms involve the quality of the game's writing, lack of verisimilitude, the switch to a first-person action game format, and the reactiveness of the surrounding game world to player actions. In response, James Stephanie Sterling of Destructoid has called fan groups like No Mutants Allowed "selfish" and "arrogant"; stating that a new audience deserves a chance to play a Fallout game; and that if the series had stayed the way it was back in 1997, new titles would never have been made and brought to market. Luke Winkie of Kotaku tempers these sentiments, saying that it is a matter of ownership; and that in the case of Fallout 3, hardcore fans of the original series witnessed their favorite games become transformed into something else and that they are "not wrong" for having grievances.

The redesigned dialogue interface featured in Fallout 4 received mixed reception by the community. Unsatisfied fans created mods for the game, providing subtitles and allowing the player to know what their character would say before choosing it as it was in previous games in the franchise such as in Fallout 3 and Fallout: New Vegas. Though even taking the mods into account, Patricia Hernandez of Kotaku criticized the writing of the game in her review, describing it as "thin", "You never have particularly long or nuanced conversations with the other characters. I like to play a Charisma-focused character, and I was disappointed."

Upon release, Fallout 76 became the lowest rated title. It has been the subject of several controversies since its release. IGN gave the game a five out of ten rating, criticizing the game for its lackluster graphics, poor use of multiplayer, and bugs, saying, "Fallout 76 fails to do any of it well enough to form an identity. Its multiplayer mindset robs its quests of all the moral decision making that makes the series great, and all that's left is a buggy mess of systemic designs that never seems to work [culminating] in an aggravating endgame that's more busywork than satisfying heroics. Bethesda missed the mark with Fallout 76...because it seems it could never decide what it was aiming for." PC Gamer, rated the game a six out of ten, praising it for its evocative and beautiful setting, large world, and combat. However, they also criticizing the game for its bugs, poor UI, and repetitiveness, saying, "[T]he world retains a lot of what I love about Bethesda's previous RPGs with finely crafted environments, enjoyable weapons and crafting, and surprising little scraps of story to uncover and investigate. Like Valley Galleria, though, it doesn't take long to for the shine to fade, the once-fascinating areas to lose their wonder among the mobs of identical enemies I've killed there time and time again."

== Legal action ==
Interplay was threatened with bankruptcy and sold the full Fallout franchise to Bethesda, but kept the rights to the Fallout MMO through a back license in April 2007 and began work on the MMO later that year. Bethesda Softworks sued Interplay Entertainment for copyright infringement on September 8, 2009, regarding the Fallout Online license and selling of Fallout Trilogy and sought an injunction to stop development of Fallout Online and sales of Fallout Trilogy. Bethesda argued that Interplay did not have the right to sell Fallout Trilogy on the Internet via Steam, Good Old Games or other online services. Bethesda also claimed that "full scale" development on Fallout Online was not met and that the minimum financing of 30 million of "secured funding" was not met. Interplay launched a counter suit claiming that Bethesda's claims were meritless and that it did have the right to sell Fallout Trilogy via online stores via its contract with Bethesda. Interplay also claimed secure funding had been met and the game was in full scale development by the cut off date. Interplay argued to have the second contract that sold Fallout voided, which would result in the first contract that licensed Fallout to come back into effect. This would mean that Fallout would revert to Interplay. Bethesda would be allowed to make Fallout 5. Bethesda would have to pay 12% of royalties on Fallout 3, Fallout: New Vegas, Fallout 4 and expansions plus interest on the money owed. On December 10, 2009, Bethesda lost the first injunction.

Bethesda then fired its first lawyer, replacing him and filing a second injunction that claimed Interplay had only back-licensed the name Fallout but no content. Interplay countered, showing that the contract stated they must make Fallout Online that has the look and feel of Fallout, and if they (Interplay) failed to meet the requirements (30 million minimum secure funding and "full scale" development by X date), they could still release the MMO if they remove all Fallout content. The contract then lists all Fallout content as locations, monsters, settings and lore. Interplay argued that Bethesda knew of and didn't object to Interplay's plan to incorporate elements from the Fallout universe in their MMO and that the contract was not solely for the name. Bethesda's second injunction was denied by the court on August 4, 2011. Bethesda appealed the denial. Bethesda then sued Masthead Studios and asked for a restraining order against the company. The restraining order was denied before Masthead Studios could file a counter-suit. Bethesda lost its appeal.

Bethesda filed a motion in limine against Interplay. Interplay filed a motion in limine against Bethesda the next day. The trial by jury (requested by Bethesda on October 26, 2010), was changed to a trial by court because the APA contract stated that all legal matters would be resolved via a trial by court. The trial began on December 12.

In 2012, Bethesda revealed in a press conference that Interplay sold them full rights to Fallout Online in exchange for 2 million dollars. Interplay's rights to sell and merchandise Fallout, Fallout 2 and Fallout Tactics: Brotherhood of Steel expired on December 31, 2013.

== See also ==
- Exodus, a role-playing game previously associated with the Fallout intellectual property during its development
- Fallout: Equestria, a crossover fan fiction between the Fallout franchise and the 2010 cartoon My Little Pony: Friendship is Magic.
