= The Radio (Fallout) =

- Fallout episode
- Episode no.: Season 1 Episode 7
- Directed by: Frederick E. O. Toye; Clare Kilner
- Written by: Chaz Hawkins
- Cinematography by: Teodoro Maniaci; Alejandro Martinez
- Editing by: Micah Gardner
- Original air date: April 10, 2024
- Running time: 61 minutes

Guest appearances
- Sarita Choudhury as Lee Moldaver; Fred Armisen as DJ Carl; Chris Parnell as Overseer Benjamin; Frances Turner as Barb Howard; Leslie Uggams as Betty Pearson; Johnny Pemberton as Thaddeus; Cherien Dabis as Birdie; Zach Cherry as Woody Thomas; Dave Register as Chet; Annabel O'Hagan as Stephanie Harper; Rodrigo Luzzi as Reg McPhee; Jon Daly as Snake Oil Salesman; Dallas Goldtooth as Charles Whiteknife; Eric Berryman as Lloyd Hawthorne; Angel Desai as Cassandra Hawthorne; Erik Estrada as Adam

Episode chronology
← Previous "The Trap"	Next → "The Beginning"
- Fallout season 1

"The Radio" is the seventh episode of the first season of the American post-apocalyptic drama television series Fallout. The episode was written by Chaz Hawkins and directed by Frederick E. O. Toye and Clare Kilner. It was released on Amazon Prime Video on April 10, 2024, alongside the rest of the season.

The series depicts the aftermath of an apocalyptic nuclear exchange in an alternate history of Earth where advances in nuclear technology after World War II led to the emergence of a retrofuturistic society and a subsequent resource war. The survivors took refuge in fallout shelters known as Vaults, built to preserve humanity in the event of nuclear annihilation. In the episode, Lucy and Maximus are forced to leave Vault 4, Norm continues investigating Vault 31, and Howard's past with Moldaver is explored.

The episode received positive reviews from critics, although some expressed frustration with the episode's pacing.

== Plot ==
Adam, a lead farmer (who uses a metal detector to collect small metal objects in the desert), returns home with his son Tommy, only to find the Ghoul sitting at his table, eating food. When Adam calls for his daughter Sandra, she doesn't immediately appear, leading him to fear that her body is part of the food the Ghoul is eating; however, she eventually returns, bringing the Ghoul some more food. The Ghoul then asks Adam and Tommy about Moldaver, showing them a map he'd obtained from Adam's oldest son; the map is covered in blood and has a bullet hole where Moldaver's location is supposed to be. It transpires that Adam's oldest son had joined up with Moldaver, and recruited Tommy (without Adam's knowledge) into accepting an assignment to deliver Wilzig to her, in return for a large amount of caps. Adam urges Tommy to give the Ghoul Moldaver's location, stating that if he does not, the Ghoul will kill all of them, including Sandra. Once Tommy gives him the information, the Ghoul then speculates that Tommy may one day be out for revenge for his older brother's death; after a brief but tense standoff, Tommy tries to go for a weapon but is gunned down by the Ghoul, who departs, leaving a sobbing Adam cradling Tommy's body in his arms.

In 2077, Howard and Moldaver, who goes by the name "Ms. Williams," talk about her conference. Howard is disgusted by her perception of his friends' deaths in war, and how Vault-Tec may be involved. She reveals that she found a solution to a possible nuclear conflict after working on cold fusion research, which could also provide unlimited energy. However, the war-profiteering conglomerate behind Vault-Tec shelved the project. She asks him to watch over his wife Barb, whose division had acquired Moldaver's research division, even telling him to record their conversations by bugging her Pip-Boy.

In the present day, Lucy is scolded by Ben for breaking into level 12. He states that the experiments were real, but were performed by the previous dwellers before they arrived. Lucy is under the impression that she is being executed, but is then told by Ben to simply leave the Vault following a mock public execution; he even gives her a cache of supplies, to her complete surprise. Maximus activates his armor after stealing the Vault's fusion core and tries to defend Lucy from what he believes to be attacking residents but soon realises the true situation, and he decides to leave with her. Maximus reveals his real identity to Lucy, who forgives him for lying and even offers to let him live with her at Vault 33. However, she scolds him for stealing the Vault's fusion core, and convinces him to return it.

In the wasteland, Thaddeus (with CX404 still following him, trying to grab the bag in which Wilzig's head is stored) stops outside of a Red Rocket truck stop to examine his foot that was injured when Maximus stepped on it (while wearing power armor) during their fight. After removing his boot and peeling off his blood-soaked sock, Thaddeus is horrified to discover that his foot is mangled beyond repair. Fearing he is going to die, Thaddeus decides to try to find a radio tower in order to send a message to the Brotherhood. Deciding that CX404 is too much of a nuisance to put up with any more, Thaddeus abandons the dog by placing her inside an empty Nuka-Cola dispenser outside of the truck stop (although he does make sure the dog is still able to breathe before departing). Some time later, he encounters a snake oil salesman, the same man who Maximus had encountered much earlier, who takes him to his "dispensary." Though Thaddeus muses over just killing him and taking his stash of drugs, the snake oil salesman points out that only he knows which of his ingredients are lethal and which are benign. He then offers to craft an unknown concoction to heal Thaddeus's broken foot; when the matter of payment is brought up, Thaddeus offers the fusion core he'd taken from Titus's suit in exchange. The snake oil salesman accepts, and, after making the concoction, gives it to Thaddeus; the unknown concoction heals his foot immediately. When Thaddeus asks the snake oil salesman if he knows of the location of a radio tower, the salesman says there is one in what used to be Shady Sands; when Thaddeus mentions that Shady Sands is supposed to be highly radioactive, the salesman enigmatically tells Thaddeus that radiation won't be bothering him anymore, before departing. Thaddeus eventually reaches the radio station, with Lucy and Maximus arriving shortly after. After shooting at them, Thaddeus triggers a booby trap and is shot through the neck with a crossbow. He removes the bolt and rapidly heals, leading Maximus to infer that Thaddeus has turned into a Ghoul. With the Brotherhood nearing, Thaddeus gives Lucy and Maximus Wilzig's head and flees to avoid being killed. Maximus decides to distract them while Lucy leaves with Wilzig's head, and they kiss before parting.

In Vault 33, Betty is starting to relocate some of the inhabitants to Vault 32. With the co-overseers separated and some of the raiders mysteriously dying, Norm decides to impersonate Betty to hack into her conversations with Vault 31's overseer. He is given access to "return" to Vault 31, and he enters the Vault without encountering anybody. At the end of the main corridor, he is shocked by something off camera.

== Production ==
=== Music ===
The score was composed by Ramin Djawadi. The episode features many songs, including "I'm Tickled Pink" by Jack Shaindlin, "Sixteen Tons" by Merle Travis, "Only You (And You Alone)" by The Platters, "What a Diff'rence a Day Makes" by Dinah Washington, "You're Everything" by The Danleers, and "From the First Hello to the Last Goodbye" by Jane Morgan.

== Release ==
The episode, along with the rest of the season, premiered on April 10, 2024, on Amazon Prime Video. Originally, the season was scheduled to premiere on April 12, 2024.

== Critical reception ==
"The Radio" received positive reviews from critics. William Hughes of The A.V. Club gave the episode a "B–" grade and wrote, "Character work is the cold fusion that keeps things powered for the long haul, and 'The Radio' just doesn't keep the lights on as well as it could. It has some fun moments, a few good gags, a nicely earned kiss, and one very good dog. But it can't do much to transcend the fact that it's an episode almost entirely about setting up what happens in the next episode."

Jack King of Vulture gave the episode a 4 star rating out of 5 and wrote, "The last handful of episodes have been stuffed. It's enough to lead you to suspect the show to have been conceived with a longer initial season in mind; even at just shy of an hour long, six and seven ask you to get through a lot and retain a lot of new information before the finale. Even so, it's impressive that the show has managed to weave together the pre- and post-war arcs so seamlessly."

Sean T. Collins of Decider wrote, "If you're in a Vault, and you're not conducting an experiment, you're the experiment. That's the lesson I think Lucy MacLean ought to take from her madcap adventures in the mysterious Vault 4, which come to a surprising conclusion in this, yet another charmingly nasty episode of Fallout." Ross Bonaime of Collider gave the episode an 8 out of 10 and wrote, "Fallout's penultimate episode is putting the pieces in compelling places for the finale, leaving our characters in their most interesting positions so far, as we wait for the ending to likely cause mayhem in their stories."

Joshua Kristian McCoy of Game Rant gave the episode a 4 star rating out of 5 and wrote, "Fallout delivers on its premise in every way that matters, sometimes to its own detriment. It's a show worth seeking out and an instant classic of its genre. Future video game adaptations should look at this as an example." Greg Wheeler of The Review Geek gave the episode a 4 star rating out of 5 and wrote, "Fallout sets everything up for a very intriguing finale to follow. All roads appear to be leading toward the mystery of Vault 31 and what may actually be inside. This sets everything up nicely for what should be a dramatic final chapter."
