= List of accolades received by Fallout (American TV series) =

Accolades
Award	Wins	Nominations
American Cinema Editors Awards	0	1
Art Directors Guild Awards	1	1
Artios Awards	0	1
Astra TV Awards	2	10
Cinema Audio Society Awards	0	1
Costume Designers Guild Awards	0	1
Critics' Choice Super Awards	0	8
Dorian Awards	0	3
The Game Awards	1	2
Gold Derby TV Awards	0	6
Golden Joystick Awards	1	1
Golden Reel Awards	0	1
Golden Trailer Awards	2	2
Gotham TV Awards	0	2
Hollywood Music in Media Awards	1	1
Make-Up Artists and Hair Stylists Guild Awards	0	1
Primetime Creative Arts Emmy Awards	4	24
Primetime Emmy Awards	0	3
Producers Guild of America Awards	0	1
Satellite Awards	0	1
Saturn Awards	2	6
Screen Actors Guild Awards	0	1
Set Decorators Society of America Awards	2	2
Television Critics Association Awards	0	2
Visual Effects Society Awards	0	1
Writers Guild of America Awards	0	3

Totals (Note: Certain award groups do not simply award one winner. They acknowledge several different recipients, have runners-up, and have third place. Since this is a specific recognition and is different from losing an award, runner-up mentions are considered wins in this award tally. For simplification and to avoid errors, each award in this list has been presumed to have had a prior nomination.)
- Wins: 16
- Nominations: 86

Fallout is an American post-apocalyptic drama television series created by Graham Wagner and Geneva Robertson-Dworet for Amazon Prime Video and based on the role-playing video game franchise created by Tim Cain and Leonard Boyarsky. (Note: Fallout was created by Tim Cain and Leonard Boyarsky, and developed by Black Isle Studios, and formerly published by Interplay Entertainment from 1997 to 2004. It has been owned by ZeniMax Media and developed by Bethesda Game Studios since 2007.) The series is set two centuries after the Great War of 2077, which society has collapsed following a nuclear holocaust – and stars an ensemble cast including Ella Purnell, Aaron Moten, Kyle MacLachlan, Moisés Arias, Xelia Mendes-Jones, and Walton Goggins. Fallout premiered on Amazon Prime Video on April 10, 2024, and the second season aired in 2025.

The first season was nominated for 17 Primetime Emmy Awards, including Outstanding Drama Series and Outstanding Lead Actor in a Drama Series for Goggins. It won two awards at the 76th Primetime Creative Arts Emmy Awards: Outstanding Emerging Media Program and Outstanding Music Supervision.

== Accolades ==
Accolades for Fallout
Award	Date of ceremony	Category	Nominee(s)	Result	Ref.
American Cinema Editors Awards	March 14, 2025	Best Edited Drama Series	Ali Comperchio (for "The End")	Nominated	
Art Directors Guild Awards	February 15, 2025	Excellence in Production Design for a One-Hour Fantasy Single-Camera Series	Howard Cummings (for "The End")	Won	
Artios Awards	February 12, 2025	Outstanding Achievement in Casting – Television Pilot and First Season Drama	John Papsidera, Julie Tucker, and Ross Meyerson	Nominated	
Astra TV Awards	December 8, 2024	Best Streaming Drama Series	Fallout	Nominated	
Astra TV Awards	December 8, 2024	Best Actor in a Streaming Drama Series	Walton Goggins	Nominated	
Astra TV Awards	December 8, 2024	Best Actress in a Streaming Drama Series	Ella Purnell	Nominated	
Astra TV Awards	December 8, 2024	Best Guest Actor in a Drama Series	Kyle MacLachlan	Won	
Astra TV Awards	December 8, 2024	Best Directing in a Streaming Drama Series	Jonathan Nolan (for "The End")	Nominated	
Astra TV Awards	December 8, 2024	Best Writing in a Streaming Drama Series	Graham Wagner and Geneva Robertson-Dworet (for "The End")	Nominated	
Astra TV Awards	August 15, 2026	Best Actor in a Drama Series	Walton Goggins	Nominated	
Astra TV Awards	August 15, 2026	Best Actress in a Drama Series	Ella Purnell	Nominated	
Astra TV Awards	August 15, 2026	Best Guest Actor in a Drama Series	Macaulay Culkin	Won	
Astra TV Awards	August 15, 2026	Best Directing in a Drama Series	Fallout	Nominated	
Cinema Audio Society Awards	February 22, 2025	Outstanding Achievement in Sound Mixing for Television Series – One Hour	Tod A. Maitland, Steve Bucino, Keith Rogers, and Mike Marino (for "The End")	Nominated	
Costume Designers Guild Awards	February 6, 2025	Excellence in Sci-Fi/Fantasy Television	Amy Westcott (for "The End")	Nominated	
Critics' Choice Super Awards	August 7, 2025	Best Superhero Series, Limited Series or Made-for-TV Movie	Fallout	Nominated	
Critics' Choice Super Awards	August 7, 2025	Best Actor in a Superhero Series, Limited Series or Made-for-TV Movie	Walton Goggins	Nominated	
Critics' Choice Super Awards	August 7, 2025	Best Actress in a Superhero Series, Limited Series or Made-for-TV Movie	Ella Purnell	Nominated	
Critics' Choice Super Awards	August 7, 2025	Best Actor in a Science Fiction/Fantasy Series, Limited Series or Made-for-TV Movie	Walton Goggins	Nominated	
Critics' Choice Super Awards	August 6, 2026	Best Superhero Series, Limited Series or Made-for-TV Movie	Fallout	Nominated	
Critics' Choice Super Awards	August 6, 2026	Best Actor in a Superhero Series, Limited Series or Made-for-TV Movie	Walton Goggins	Nominated	
Critics' Choice Super Awards	August 6, 2026	Best Actress in a Superhero Series, Limited Series or Made-for-TV Movie	Annabel O'Hagan	Nominated	
Critics' Choice Super Awards	August 6, 2026	Best Villain in a Series, Limited Series or Made-for-TV Movie	Macaulay Culkin	Nominated	
Dorian Awards	August 12, 2024	Best TV Drama	Fallout	Nominated	
Dorian Awards	August 12, 2024	Best TV Drama	Fallout	Nominated	
Dorian Awards	August 12, 2024	Most Visually Striking Show	Fallout	Nominated	
The Game Awards	December 12, 2024	Best Adaptation	Fallout	Won	
The Game Awards	December 10, 2026	Best Adaptation	Fallout season 2	Pending	
Gold Derby TV Awards	August 14, 2024	Drama Series	Fallout	Nominated	
Gold Derby TV Awards	August 14, 2024	Drama Actor	Walton Goggins	Nominated	
Gold Derby TV Awards	August 14, 2024	Drama Guest Actress	Dale Dickey	Nominated	
Gold Derby TV Awards	August 14, 2024	Drama Guest Actor	Michael Emerson	Nominated	
Gold Derby TV Awards	August 14, 2024	Drama Guest Actor	Kyle MacLachlan	Nominated	
Gold Derby TV Awards	August 14, 2024	Performer of the Year	Ella Purnell	Nominated	
Golden Joystick Awards	November 21, 2024	Best Game Adaptation	Fallout	Won	
Golden Joystick Awards	November 11, 2026	Best Game Adaptation	Fallout season 2	Nominated	
Golden Reel Awards	February 23, 2025	Outstanding Achievement in Music Editing – Broadcast Long Form	Clint Bennet and Christopher Kaller (for "The End")	Nominated	
Golden Trailer Awards	May 29, 2025	Most Original (TV Spot) for a TV/Streaming Series	Amazon MGM Studios / Aspect (for "Wasteland Review")	Won	
Golden Trailer Awards	May 29, 2025	Best Action/Thriller TrailerByte for a TV/Streaming Series	Prime Video / Ignition Creative London (for "Doom Scrolling")	Won	
Gotham TV Awards	June 4, 2024	Breakthrough Drama Series	Fallout	Nominated	
Gotham TV Awards	June 4, 2024	Outstanding Performance in a Drama Series	Walton Goggins	Nominated	
Hollywood Music in Media Awards	November 20, 2024	Music Supervision – Television	Trygge Toven	Won	
Make-Up Artists and Hair Stylists Guild Awards	February 15, 2025	Best Period and/or Character Make-Up in a Television Series, Television Limited or Miniseries or Television New Media Series	Michael Harvey, Kim Amacker, David Kalahiki, and Mara Palumbo	Nominated	
Primetime Creative Arts Emmy Awards	September 7, 2024	Outstanding Emerging Media Program	Fallout: Vault 33	Won	
Primetime Creative Arts Emmy Awards	September 8, 2024	Outstanding Fantasy/Sci-Fi Costumes	Amy Westcott, Amy Burt, Wendy Yang, Jonathan Knipscher, and Cherie Cunningham Collins (for "The End")	Nominated	
Primetime Creative Arts Emmy Awards	September 8, 2024	Outstanding Period or Fantasy/Sci-Fi Makeup (Non-Prosthetic)	Michael Harvey, Kimberly Amacker, and David Kalahiki (for "The Head")	Nominated	
Primetime Creative Arts Emmy Awards	September 8, 2024	Outstanding Prosthetic Makeup	Jake Garber, Rich Krusell, Lindsay Gelfand, Gregory Nicotero, Vincent Van Dyke, and Lisa Forst (for "The Beginning")	Nominated	
Primetime Creative Arts Emmy Awards	September 8, 2024	Outstanding Main Title Design	Patrick Clair, Lance Slaton, Raoul Marks, and Scott Geersen	Nominated	
Primetime Creative Arts Emmy Awards	September 8, 2024	Outstanding Music Supervision	Trygge Toven (for "The End")	Won	
Primetime Creative Arts Emmy Awards	September 8, 2024	Outstanding Picture Editing for a Drama Series	Ali Comperchio (for "The End")	Nominated	
Primetime Creative Arts Emmy Awards	September 8, 2024	Outstanding Picture Editing for a Drama Series	Yoni Reiss (for "The Ghouls")	Nominated	
Primetime Creative Arts Emmy Awards	September 8, 2024	Outstanding Production Design for a Narrative Period or Fantasy Program (One Hour or More)	Howard Cummings, Laura Ballinger Gardner, and Regina Graves (for "The End")	Nominated	
Primetime Creative Arts Emmy Awards	September 8, 2024	Outstanding Sound Editing for a Comedy or Drama Series (One Hour)	Sue Gamsaragan Cahill, Daniel Colman, Joseph Fraioli, Jane Boegel-Koch, Sara Bencivenga, Jonathan Golodner, Karen Triest, Randall Guth, Christopher Kaller, Clint Bennet, Nancy Parker, and Katie Rose (for "The Target")	Nominated	
Primetime Creative Arts Emmy Awards	September 8, 2024	Outstanding Sound Mixing for a Comedy or Drama Series (One Hour)	Keith Rogers, Steve Bucino, and Tod A. Maitland (for "The Target")	Nominated	
Primetime Creative Arts Emmy Awards	September 8, 2024	Outstanding Special Visual Effects in a Season or a Movie	Jay Worth, Andrea Knoll, Grant Everett, Jill Paget, Jacqueline VandenBussche, Devin Maggio, Andreas Giesen, Ahmed Gharraph, and Joao Sita	Nominated	
Primetime Creative Arts Emmy Awards	September 8, 2024	Outstanding Stunt Coordination for Drama Programming	Casey O'Neill	Nominated	
Primetime Creative Arts Emmy Awards	September 8, 2024	Outstanding Stunt Performance	Justice Hedenberg, Hannah Scott, Adam Shippey, and Noelle Mulligan (for "The Target")	Nominated	
Primetime Creative Arts Emmy Awards	September 5, 2026	Outstanding Emerging Media Program	The World Of Fallout	Nominated	
Primetime Creative Arts Emmy Awards	September 6, 2026	Outstanding Fantasy/Sci-Fi Costumes	Dayna Pink, Conan Castro, Annie Jewell, Imogene Chayes, and Christopher Lawrence (for "The Strip")	Won	
Primetime Creative Arts Emmy Awards	September 6, 2026	Outstanding Period Or Fantasy/Sci-Fi Hairstyling	Dennis Bailey, April Schuller, Katy McClintock, George Wilson, Raquel Bianchini, and Roma Goddard (for "The Strip")	Nominated	
Primetime Creative Arts Emmy Awards	September 6, 2026	Outstanding Period or Fantasy/Sci-Fi Makeup (Non-Prosthetic)	Elisa Marsh, John Damiani, Jennifer Aspinall, Cynthia Hernandez, Kenneth Calhoun, Lisa Rocco, Sabine Roller Taylor, and Josh Foster (for "The Strip")	Nominated	
Primetime Creative Arts Emmy Awards	September 6, 2026	Outstanding Production Design for a Narrative Period or Fantasy Program (One Hour or More)	Howard Cummings, David Lazan, and Julie Ochipinti (for "The Wrangler")	Won	
Primetime Creative Arts Emmy Awards	September 6, 2026	Outstanding Prosthetic Makeup	Jake Garber, Greg Funk, Gregory Nicotero, Carey Jones, Vincent Van Dyke, Gabriel De Cunto, Kevin Wasner, and Scott Stoddard (for "The Demon in the Snow")	Nominated	
Primetime Creative Arts Emmy Awards	September 6, 2026	Outstanding Sound Editing for a Comedy or Drama Series (One Hour)	Sue Gamsaragan Cahill, Daniel Colman, Joseph Fraioli, Jane Boegel-Koch, Sara Bencivenga, James Parnell, Randall Guth, Christopher Kaller, Pamela Kahn, Dominique Decaudian, and Alex Ullrich (for "The Strip")	Nominated	
Primetime Creative Arts Emmy Awards	September 6, 2026	Outstanding Sound Mixing for a Comedy or Drama Series (One Hour)	Keith Rogers, Steve Bucino, Ed Novick, and Mike Marino (for "The Strip")	Nominated	
Primetime Creative Arts Emmy Awards	September 6, 2026	Outstanding Stunt Coordination for Drama Programming	Casey O'Neill and Josh Kemble	Nominated	
Primetime Creative Arts Emmy Awards	September 6, 2026	Outstanding Stunt Performance	Jeremy Fitzgerald and Tim Soergel (for "The Profligate")	Nominated	
Primetime Emmy Awards	September 15, 2024	Outstanding Drama Series	Jonathan Nolan, Lisa Joy, Geneva Robertson-Dworet, Graham Wagner, Athena Wickham, Todd Howard, James Altman, Margot Lulick, James W. Skotchdopole, Stephen Semel, Karey Dornetto, Carson Mell, Kieran Fitzgerald, Jill Footlick, Noreen O'Toole, Jay Worth, Crystal Whelan, Halle Phillips, Gursimran Sandhu, and Skye Wathen	Nominated	
Primetime Emmy Awards	September 15, 2024	Outstanding Lead Actor in a Drama Series	Walton Goggins (for "The Ghouls")	Nominated	
Primetime Emmy Awards	September 15, 2024	Outstanding Writing for a Drama Series	Geneva Robertson-Dworet and Graham Wagner (for "The End")	Nominated	
Producers Guild of America Awards	February 8, 2025	Norman Felton Award for Outstanding Producer of Episodic – Drama	Fallout	Nominated	
Satellite Awards	January 26, 2025	Best Actor in a Supporting Role in a Series, Miniseries & Limited Series, or Motion Picture Made for Television	Walton Goggins	Nominated	
Saturn Awards	February 2, 2025	Best Science Fiction Television Series	Fallout	Won	
Saturn Awards	February 2, 2025	Best Actor in a Television Series	Walton Goggins	Nominated	
Saturn Awards	February 2, 2025	Best Actress in a Television Series	Ella Purnell	Nominated	
Saturn Awards	February 2, 2025	Best Supporting Actor in a Television Series	Aaron Moten	Nominated	
Saturn Awards	February 2, 2025	Best Guest Star in a Television Series	Kyle MacLachlan	Nominated	
Saturn Awards	February 2, 2025	Spotlight Award	Fallout	Won	
Screen Actors Guild Awards	February 23, 2025	Outstanding Performance by a Stunt Ensemble in a Comedy or Drama Series	Fallout	Nominated	
Set Decorators Society of America Awards	August 5, 2024	Best Achievement in Décor/Design of a One Hour Fantasy or Science Fiction Series	Regina Graves and Howard Cummings	Won	
Set Decorators Society of America Awards	August 9, 2026	Best Achievement in Décor/Design of a One Hour Fantasy or Science Fiction Series	Julie Ochipinti and Howard Cummings	Won	
Television Critics Association Awards	July 12, 2024	Outstanding Achievement in Drama	Fallout	Nominated	
Television Critics Association Awards	July 12, 2024	Outstanding New Program	Fallout	Nominated	
Visual Effects Society Awards	February 11, 2025	Outstanding Visual Effects in a Photoreal Episode	Jay Worth, Andrea Knoll, Grant Everett, Joao Sita, and Devin Maggio (for "The Head")	Nominated	
Writers Guild of America Awards	February 15, 2025	Drama Series	Jake Bender, Karey Dornetto, Zach Dunn, Kieran Fitzgerald, Chaz Hawkins, Lisa Joy, Carson Mell, Jonathan Nolan, Geneva Robertson-Dworet, Gursimran Sandhu, and Graham Wagner	Nominated	
Writers Guild of America Awards	February 15, 2025	New Series	Jake Bender, Karey Dornetto, Zach Dunn, Kieran Fitzgerald, Chaz Hawkins, Lisa Joy, Carson Mell, Jonathan Nolan, Geneva Robertson-Dworet, Gursimran Sandhu, and Graham Wagner	Nominated	
Writers Guild of America Awards	February 15, 2025	Episodic Drama	Gursimran Sandhu (for "The Beginning")	Nominated	
