= Fallout season 1 =

Fallout
- Season 1
- Promotional poster
- Showrunners: Graham Wagner; Geneva Robertson-Dworet
- Starring: Ella Purnell; Aaron Moten; Kyle MacLachlan; Moisés Arias; Xelia Mendes-Jones; Walton Goggins
- No. of episodes: 8

Release
- Original network: Amazon Prime Video
- Original release: April 10, 2024

Season chronology
- Next → Season 2

The first season of the American post-apocalyptic drama television series Fallout premiered on April 10, 2024, with all eight episodes being released in a single day on Amazon Prime Video. Based on the role-playing video game franchise created by Tim Cain and Leonard Boyarsky, (Note: Fallout was created by Tim Cain and Leonard Boyarsky, and developed by Black Isle Studios, and formerly published by Interplay Entertainment from 1997 to 2004. It has been owned by ZeniMax Media and developed by Bethesda Game Studios since 2007.) the series is set two centuries after the Great War of 2077, in which society has collapsed following a nuclear holocaust. The season stars Ella Purnell, Aaron Moten, Kyle MacLachlan, Moisés Arias, Xelia Mendes-Jones, and Walton Goggins.

Fallout received positive reviews, with praise for the performances (particularly of Purnell, Moten, and Goggins), writing, visuals, production design, and faithfulness to the source material. It was also nominated for 17 Primetime Emmy Awards, including Outstanding Drama Series and Outstanding Lead Actor in a Drama Series for Goggins.

== Cast and characters ==
=== Main ===
- Ella Purnell as Lucy MacLean, a Vault 33 Dweller
  - Luciana VanDette portrays young Lucy MacLean
- Aaron Moten as Maximus, a squire of the Brotherhood of Steel and later ally of Lucy
  - Amir Carr portrays young Maximus
- Kyle MacLachlan (Note: Credited as part of the main cast only for episodes in which they appear.) as Hank MacLean, Lucy and Norm's father and Overseer of Vault 33
- Moisés Arias as Norm MacLean, Vault 33 resident and Lucy's younger brother
- Xelia Mendes-Jones as Dane, a scribe of the Brotherhood of Steel
- Walton Goggins as Cooper Howard / The Ghoul, a Hollywood actor and Vault-Tec ambassador before the Great War, who mutated into a ghoul and is now a gunslinger and bounty hunter

=== Recurring ===
- Sarita Choudhury as Kate Williams / Lee Moldaver, a nuclear scientist who survived the Great War and later became a New California Republic (NCR) commander
- Leslie Uggams as Betty Pearson, Vault 33 councillor and later Overseer
  - Princess Bey portrays young Betty Pearson
- Johnny Pemberton as Thaddeus, a squire of the Brotherhood of Steel
- Zach Cherry as Woody Thomas, Vault 33 councillor
- Annabel O'Hagan as Stephanie Harper, pregnant Vault 33 resident
- Dave Register as Chet, Lucy and Norm's cousin and Vault 33 gatekeeper
- Rodrigo Luzzi as Reg McPhee, Vault 33 councillor
- Leer Leary as Davey, Vault 33 resident
- Elle Vertes as Rose MacLean, Lucy and Norm's mother
- Teagan Meredith as Janey Howard, Cooper's daughter
- Frances Turner as Barb Howard, Cooper's wife and high-ranking Vault-Tec executive

=== Guest ===
- Michael Cristofer as Elder Cleric Quintus, Maximus's superior and leader of the Brotherhood of Steel San Fernando chapter
- Mykelti Williamson as Honcho, a bounty hunter who revives Cooper from imprisonment
- Matt Berry as:
  - "Mr. Handy", a General Atomics helper bot in 2077
  - "Snip Snip", a Mr. Handy turned organ harvester
  - Sebastian Leslie, an English actor who provided the voice of the Handys, and Cooper's pre-apocalypse friend
- Cameron Cowperthwaite as Monty, a raider who "married" Lucy as part of a ruse to kidnap Hank
- Jacinto Taras Riddick as Cleric Felix, high-ranking member of the Brotherhood of Steel
- Joel Marsh Garland and Jacob A. Ware as Biggie and Slim, Honcho's minions
- Mike Doyle and Janie Brookshire as Bob Spencer and Rhonda Spencer, Cooper's pre-apocalypse employers for their child's birthday party
- Michael Emerson as Dr. Siggi Wilzig, an enigmatic defector from the Enclave whose head carries the solution to Cold Fusion
- Michael Rapaport as Knight Titus, whom Maximus initially serves and later impersonates
- Dale Dickey as Ma June, a cantankerous shopkeeper in the settlement of Filly
- Jon Daly as the Snake Oil Salesman, who is a mercantile denizen of the wasteland
- Michael Abbott Jr. as a lonesome farmer living just outside Filly
- Neal Huff as Roger, a ghoul and friend of Cooper's, slowly succumbing to ferality
- Michael Esper as Bud Askins / Brain-on-a-Roomba, a senior junior vice president at Vault-Tec in 2077 and the Overseer of Vault 31 post-war
- Matty Cardarople and Elvis Valentino Lopez as Huey and Squirrel, a pair of bumbling organ harvesters
- Chris Parnell as Benjamin, the Cyclops Overseer of Vault 4
- Cherien Dabis as Birdie, a surface-born resident of Vault 4 and former resident of Shady Sands
- Glenn Fleshler as Sorrel Booker, the self-titled "President" of The Govermint (sic) who seeks to maintain order in the Wasteland
- Dallas Goldtooth as Charles Whiteknife, a pre-apocalypse actor friend of Cooper's
- Eric Berryman as Lloyd Hawthorne, the first overseer of Vault 4
- Angel Desai as Cassandra Hawthorne, Lloyd's wife
- Fred Armisen as DJ Carl, the host of an old-timey radio station
- Erik Estrada as Adam, a former ranger for the New California Republic turned farmer whose son is affiliated with Moldaver
- Michael Mulheren as Frederick Sinclair, a representative of Big MT and the founder of the Sierra Madre Casino
- Rafi Silver as a body-double of Robert Edwin House, the CEO of RobCo Industries and ruler of the New Vegas Strip in 2281
- James Yaegashi as Leon Von Felden, a top West-Tek executive
- Rebecca Watson as Julia Masters, a top REPCONN executive

== Episodes ==
No. overall	No. in season	Title	Directed by	Written by	Original release date
1	1	"The End"	Jonathan Nolan	Geneva Robertson-Dworet & Graham Wagner	April 10, 2024
In 2077, actor Cooper Howard and his daughter Janey are caught in the middle of a nuclear attack against Los Angeles. 219 years later, Vault 33 dweller Lucy MacLean volunteers for an arranged marriage with a dweller from Vault 32, which is connected to Vaults 33 and 31. After the wedding, the Vault 32 visitors are revealed to be raiders led by Lee Moldaver. Lucy's father and overseer of Vault 33, Hank MacLean, is forced to leave with them. In defiance of Vault regulations, Lucy decides to go to the surface by herself to search for her father. Meanwhile, Brotherhood of Steel aspirant Maximus is promoted to the rank of squire and joins Knight Titus in hunting for a member of the Enclave. Elsewhere, several bounty hunters locate Cooper, who has been transformed by radiation into a ghoul, and attempt to recruit him to find the same Enclave member. Instead, the Ghoul kills them all and pursues the bounty alone.
2	2	"The Target"	Jonathan Nolan	Geneva Robertson-Dworet & Graham Wagner	April 10, 2024
In an Enclave facility, Dr. Siggi Wilzig develops a mysterious, small, blue device before injecting it into his neck. He flees the facility with his experimental dog, CX404. In the wasteland, Lucy encounters Wilzig, who urges her to return to Vault 33. Maximus and Titus begin their search and are attacked by a mutant bear. Titus is wounded, but his mistreatment of Maximus prompts the squire to let him bleed out before taking the knight's power armor for himself. Lucy reunites with Wilzig in Filly, where he attempts to arrange safe passage to Moldaver. Seeking the bounty, the Ghoul attacks them but is distracted by Maximus, allowing Lucy to escape with Wilzig. A wounded CX404 is left behind, but the Ghoul heals the dog and uses her to track Wilzig. Severely wounded, Wilzig ingests cyanide as he believes he will slow Lucy down, instructing her to deliver his head to Moldaver in exchange for Hank.
3	3	"The Head"	Jonathan Nolan	Geneva Robertson-Dworet & Graham Wagner	April 10, 2024
Maximus assumes Titus's identity, and the Brotherhood sends a new squire, former bully Thaddeus, believing Maximus dead. Lucy is attacked by a mutated gulper which swallows Wilzig's head. The Ghoul arrives with CX404 and uses Lucy as bait to lure out the gulper, but the chems which maintain his health are destroyed in the attempt. Leaving CX404 behind, the Ghoul departs with Lucy as his prisoner. Maximus and Thaddeus track the head to the same location and defeat the gulper, recovering the head and taking custody of CX404. Back in Vault 33, Norm MacLean asks the council to execute several captured raiders for murder, but he is rebuffed. In 2077, Cooper becomes a celebrity spokesman for Vault-Tec at the encouragement of his wife, a top company executive.
4	4	"The Ghouls"	Daniel Gray Longino	Kieran Fitzgerald	April 10, 2024
In Vault 33, Norm becomes suspicious after an exchange with a captive raider. He and Chet explore Vault 32, discovering that its residents died two years prior as a consequence of infighting and that someone used his deceased mother Rose's Pip-Boy to let the raiders in. The Ghoul encounters his friend Roger, a ghoul on the brink of going feral. He kills Roger and cannibalizes him in front of Lucy. The Ghoul takes Lucy to an abandoned supermarket. He trades her to a gang of organ harvesters for replacement chems but collapses before the trade is complete. About to be cut open, Lucy fights back and frees the captive ghouls held by the harvesters. The feral ghouls attack her and the gang, and Lucy is forced to kill for the first time. She leaves, but not before giving the Ghoul the chems he needs.
5	5	"The Past"	Clare Kilner	Carson Mell	April 10, 2024
Maximus confesses his true identity to Thaddeus. Disgusted, Thaddeus disables Maximus's power armor and leaves with Wilzig's head and CX404. Lucy finds Maximus and they agree to work together to retrieve the head. The pair stumble upon the ruins of Shady Sands, a once thriving post-war city that was the capital of the prosperous New California Republic (NCR), and Maximus's former home. Maximus is injured by a cannibalistic Fiend, and while searching for medical supplies in an abandoned Vault-Tec building, the two accidentally fall into Vault 4. Back in Vault 33, council president Betty Pearson is elected as overseer by a 98% majority. Norm hacks Vault 32's central computer and finds that every overseer of Vaults 32 and 33 originally came from Vault 31, including his father, Hank. Betty orders that Vault 32 be repopulated by 33 once cleared of the deceased dwellers.
6	6	"The Trap"	Frederick E. O. Toye	Karey Dornetto	April 10, 2024
Lucy and Maximus are greeted by Birdie, a Shady Sands survivor, and Ben, the Vault 4 overseer. They explain that Vault 4 has opened itself to the surface, taking in many refugees from Shady Sands and the surrounding area. While Maximus slowly acclimates to the Vault, Lucy is horrified over the refugees' eccentric rituals and worship of Moldaver as "The Flame Mother". The Ghoul wakes up to find an armed posse has arrested him for past crimes; he stalls for time to regain strength and then easily overpowers and kills them. Convinced that Vault 4 is hiding something, Lucy ventures to the forbidden level 12. She uncovers human experiments before getting caught, but it is explained to her that Vault 4 citizens fought back against these scientists and now live in peace. Pre-War, Cooper becomes conflicted over the secrecy of Barb's association with Vault-Tec. He is invited to a covert meeting to discuss the conspiracy behind Vault-Tec, hosted by a younger Moldaver.
7	7	"The Radio"	Frederick E. O. Toye, Clare Kilner	Chaz Hawkins	April 10, 2024
Residents of Vault 4 gather as Lucy is prepped for expulsion from the vault. Maximus leaves with her, after a brief conflict with the vault residents. Lucy invites Maximus to live with her in Vault 33. Thaddeus abandons CX404 and makes contact with the Brotherhood. Lucy and Maximus eventually catch up with Thaddeus; after learning that he is turning into a ghoul, for which the Brotherhood would put him to death, Thaddeus relinquishes the head. Lucy continues her journey alone while Maximus stays behind to distract the Brotherhood. Norm secretly breaks into Vault 31. Meanwhile, the Ghoul, having determined Moldaver's location, reunites with CX404, renaming her Dogmeat. In 2077, a younger Moldaver (then named Kate Williams) reveals that the war-profiting conglomerate behind Vault-Tec shelved her cold fusion research despite its potential to provide unlimited energy and prevent war with China over dwindling oil resources. She persuades Howard that he cannot trust his wife and should record all her conversations with the company board.
8	8	"The Beginning"	Wayne Yip	Gursimran Sandhu	April 10, 2024
Lucy and Norm separately uncover the truth behind the war, while the Ghoul remembers it from his past. Pre-War, Cooper overhears Vault-Tec executives Barb and Bud Askins planning to start a nuclear war to eliminate competitors, and meets Betty Pearson and Hank MacLean. In the present, Norm discovers Vault 31 contains cryogenically preserved Vault-Tec junior executives overseen by Bud's cyborg brain, which traps him there and gives him the choice between starving to death or enter his father's cryopod. Lucy hands a severed head to Moldaver and learns that Rose fled Vault 33 with her children, but Hank later caused the nuclear destruction of Shady Sands, turning Rose into a feral ghoul. Maximus is forgiven by the Brotherhood and joins the fight against Moldaver. Lucy convinces Hank to give Moldaver the code to activate a cold fusion reactor; after learning the truth, Maximus attacks Hank and Lucy disowns him. Lucy kills Rose and agrees to travel with the Ghoul and Dogmeat to find Vault-Tec's leaders. Moldaver activates the reactor, restoring power to Los Angeles before dying, Maximus is hailed as Knight Maximus, and Hank escapes to New Vegas.

== Production ==
=== Development ===
Bethesda had been approached several times about a television adaptation of the Fallout video games since the developer released Fallout 3 in 2008, according to Bethesda's Todd Howard, though he felt none of the suggestions met the vision of the Fallout series. Bethesda's marketing executive Pete Hines had also warned the company in 2015 about the potential impact of a poor adaptation of their video games, saying, "There's way more things that can go wrong than can go right with this," since the adaptation's director may override the vision of the series. Hines pointed to the example of the 2005 Doom film as an example of a bad adaptation.

The situation changed when Jonathan Nolan approached Bethesda with his idea of a Fallout television series, having been an avid player of the game series. Howard, having seen what Nolan had created with the Westworld series, found that Nolan had a clear vision for the adaptation, and agreed this approach was a good way to bring the game series to the television screen. Bethesda gave Nolan the freedom to craft a story as long as it remained true to the Fallout universe but served as its unique narrative within the game series and not translate one of the existing games to television.

The television adaptation was formally announced in July 2020 under Amazon Studios (later renamed Amazon MGM Studios) with Nolan and Lisa Joy developing the work. Joy described the series as "a gonzo, crazy, funny, adventure, and mindfuck like none you've ever seen before".

In January 2022, Geneva Robertson-Dworet and Graham Wagner were hired as show runners for the series, with Nolan set to direct the pilot episode.

The series is canon within the Fallout continuity. Howard wanted an original story instead of an adaptation of the games, though the series incorporates game storylines and factions, such as the Brotherhood of Steel. The series' 2296 setting is the furthest in the future that the Fallout franchise has occurred. On April 18, 2024, Amazon Prime Video renewed the series for a second season. The first season had a budget of $153 million.

=== Casting ===
In February 2022, Walton Goggins was cast in a lead role as Cooper Howard, a Hollywood actor who became a Ghoul after the bombs fell. In March 2022, Ella Purnell joined the cast as a peppy Vault-Dweller. In June 2022, Kyle MacLachlan (Hank MacLean), Xelia Mendes-Jones (Dane) and Aaron Moten (Maximus) joined as regulars.

In October 2023, additional casting including Sarita Choudhury (Moldaver), Michael Emerson (Dr. Siggi Wilzig), Leslie Uggams (Betty Pearson) and Zach Cherry (Woody Thomas) was announced.

=== Filming ===
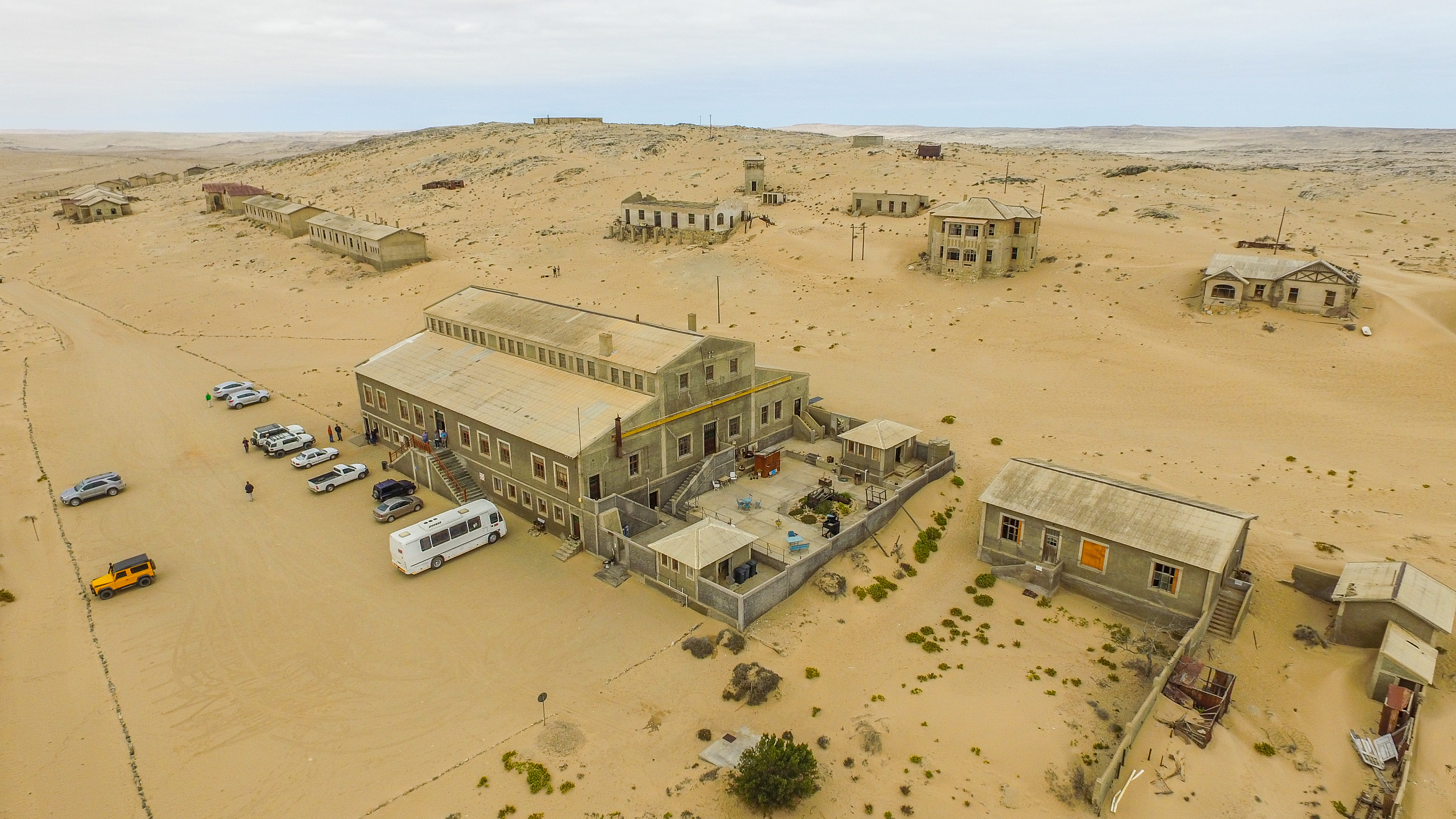
An overhead shot of Kolmanskop, Namibia, which was used for filming shots in the wasteland.

Principal photography began on July 5, 2022, in New Jersey, New York and Utah, and was shot on 35mm film. Wasteland scenes were additionally filmed in Kolmanskop, a former mining operation-turned-ghost town, as well as on Namibia's infamous Skeleton Coast. The desolate location is where desert sands meet the sea, where the western Namib Desert reaches Namibia's South Atlantic coastline. As a result of the treacherous seas offshore, the "skeleton" coast is dotted with both historic and recent shipwrecks; some scenes were filmed at the wreck of the Eduard Bohlen. Nolan directed the first three episodes of the series, with Stuart Dryburgh and Teodoro Maniaci as cinematographers.

=== Music ===
Ramin Djawadi composed a score inspired by the works of Inon Zur's Fallout series compositions. Fallout also features a licensed soundtrack like the video game series.

The television series' first soundtrack was released by Amazon on April 8, 2024.

=== Post-production ===
Jay Worth was the production's visual effects supervisor, returning to work with director Jonathan Nolan and executive producer Lisa Joy following Person of Interest, Westworld, The Peripheral and Reminiscence. Grant Everett was the on-set visual effects supervisor who brought together a variety of visual effects studios for the environment, creatures, hard surface work and more. Framestore in Montreal took on the Yao Guai and Gulper creature work, RISE FX in Germany handled the Vertibird shots, Power Armor work and numerous environments, Swedish studio Important Looking Pirates took on the Cyclops overseer of Vault 4 and Snip-Snip. FutureWorks in India did the Ghoul nosework. Refuge, CoSA, Mavericks, One of Us, Studio 8 and Deep Water FX were also involved across the 3,300 visual effects shots of the season.

== Release ==
=== Streaming ===
Fallout was scheduled to premiere on Amazon Prime Video on April 12, 2024, but this date was later moved forward to be released on April 10, 2024, at 6 PM Pacific Time (GMT-8:00).

=== Home media ===
The first season of Fallout was released on Ultra HD Blu-ray, Blu-ray and DVD by MGM Home Entertainment on July 8, 2025. A limited edition Ultra HD Blu-Ray steelbook will be available exclusively through Amazon's website and will come with six collectible art cards.

== Reception ==
=== Viewership ===
According to Amazon, Fallout pulled in 65 million viewers in its first 16 days of availability, and was the second most-watched title in the history of the platform after The Lord of the Rings: The Rings of Power in 2022. As of October 2024, the series has surpassed 100 million viewers.

The adaptation's success on Amazon Prime Video has led to renewed commercial success of the Fallout video games, including the original game; according to Steam Charts, it experienced the highest percentage increase in player base at 160%.

=== Critical response ===
The review aggregator website Rotten Tomatoes reported a 93% approval rating based on 133 critic reviews, with an average rating of 8/10. The website's critics consensus reads, "An adaptation that feels like a true extension of the games, Fallout is a post-apocalyptic blast for newcomers and longtime fans alike." Metacritic assigned a score of 73 out of 100 based on 33 critics, indicating "generally favorable reviews".

Kristen Baldwin of Entertainment Weekly gave the series a B+ and said, "The eight-episode season exists in a vivid and captivating universe that will be familiar to gamers—though knowledge of the franchise isn't required to enjoy its darkly comic dystopian pleasures." Reviewing the series for the San Francisco Chronicle, Zaki Hasan gave a rating of 3/4 and wrote, "With a raft of unfolding mysteries, protagonists we care about and a quest we want to see through to the end, Fallout is well situated to grow the loyal fan base that has kept the video game franchise going for 27 years."

Multiple critics called Fallout one of the best video game adaptations of all time. Film and television adaptations of video games as a whole have garnered a negative reputation due to multiple high-profile failures (such as the aforementioned Doom film). In this regard, commentators have compared Fallout to The Last of Us, another well-received video game adaptation for television. In a YouTube video, Tim Cain, the creator of Fallout, praised the adaptation for matching the mood of the series and for its easter eggs and characters. He also defended the adaptation from accusations of contradicting the Fallout canon.
