= The Trap (Fallout) =

- Fallout episode
- Episode no.: Season 1 Episode 6
- Directed by: Frederick E. O. Toye
- Written by: Karey Dornetto
- Cinematography by: Teodoro Maniaci
- Editing by: Daniel Raj Koobir
- Original air date: April 10, 2024
- Running time: 60 minutes

Guest appearances
- Sarita Choudhury as Lee Moldaver; Matt Berry as Sebastian Leslie; Chris Parnell as Overseer Benjamin; Frances Turner as Barb Howard; Michael Esper as Bud Askins; Cherien Dabis as Birdie; Glenn Fleshler as Sorrel Booker; Dallas Goldtooth as Charles Whiteknife; Eric Berryman as Lloyd Hawthorne; Angel Desai as Cassandra Hawthorne

Episode chronology
← Previous "The Past"	Next → "The Radio"
- Fallout season 1

"The Trap" is the sixth episode of the first season of the American post-apocalyptic drama television series Fallout. The episode was written by co-executive producer Karey Dornetto and directed by Frederick E. O. Toye. It was released on Amazon Prime Video on April 10, 2024, alongside the rest of the season.

The series depicts the aftermath of an apocalyptic nuclear exchange in an alternate history of Earth where advances in nuclear technology after World War II led to the emergence of a retrofuturistic society and a subsequent resource war. The survivors took refuge in fallout shelters known as Vaults, built to preserve humanity in the event of nuclear annihilation. In the episode, Lucy and Maximus discover more about Vault 4, while Howard's past is explored.

The episode received very positive reviews from critics, who praised the flashback sequences and writing.

== Plot ==
Howard introduces Vault 4 for a Vault-Tec commercial. After filming, he is introduced to Bud Askins, a Vault-Tec executive. Howard dislikes Askins, as his connections to West-Tek (a major defense contractor and research corporation) caused many of his friends and allies to die during a battle in Alaska, due to a defect in the T-45 Power Armor. At a party, Howard talks with English actor Sebastian Leslie, lamenting that his commitment to Vault-Tec caused him to be fired from a film. Sebastian, who has sold his voice rights to be used for Mr. Handy robots, suggests that Howard leave Hollywood and "become a product."

At Vault 4, Lucy and Maximus are introduced to Birdie, a Shady Sands survivor, and Benjamin, the one-eyed Overseer. Many of the residents are from Shady Sands, with Vault 4 opening its doors to anyone on the surface. While Lucy suggests having sex with Maximus, his training at the Brotherhood made him lose interest in sex, as well as cause confusion in his mind about certain details. As Maximus enjoys the benefits of his new home, Lucy decides to explore the area, being told by Ben that some of the inhabitants are victims of mutation. She discovers a classroom, and unfurls a New California Republic flag.

Waking up in the supermarket, the Ghoul is captured by a pair of sheriffs claiming to be working for the Govermint (sic). He is brought before the Govermint's self-titled President, Sorrel Booker, and turns down his suggestion of working with him; Booker then sentences him to death. The Ghoul quickly kills the sheriffs but, before he leaves, is astounded to find a bounty poster of a woman he claims to know, who Booker identifies as Moldaver. In a flashback to the pre-war days, Howard meets with his friend at a covert meeting to discuss a conspiracy theory about Vault-Tec's business model – they cannot sell vaults if people believe peace is imminent. He meets the group's leader, Miss Williams, a younger Moldaver.

Back at Vault 4, Lucy is taken aback when she sees the inhabitants perform a ritual wherein they strip to their waist, cover their face in ashes, and drink blood, worshipping Moldaver as "the Flame Mother." She descends to the forbidden level 12 and discovers that the inhabitants are regularly experimented on. She watches a video of a woman giving birth to gulpers (mutated axolotls) only to be consumed by them, and also discovers several cryogenic sleep pods of other pregnant women. Birdie and other Vault 4 dwellers capture her as Maximus happily watches television in his room, enjoying luxuries he had not known on the surface.

== Production ==
=== Music ===
The score is composed by Ramin Djawadi. The episode featured many songs, including "Theme from A Summer Place" by Percy Faith, "Lonely Hours" by Gene Armstrong and His Texas Nite Hawks, "Summer in Love" by I Marc 4, "Give Me the Simple Life" by June Christy, "Skitter Skatter" by Metrotones, and "I'm Tickled Pink" by Jack Shaindlin.

== Release ==
The episode, along with the rest of the season, premiered on April 10, 2024, on Amazon Prime Video. Originally, the season was scheduled to premiere on April 12, 2024.

== Critical reception ==
"The Trap" received very positive reviews from critics. William Hughes of The A.V. Club gave the episode a "B+" grade and wrote, "“The Trap,” then, is a mixed bag. The highs are very high. But they're also sporadic in an episode with a fair amount of downtime and which sometimes feels like it's marking time for yet more shocking reveals ahead. Still, it is an episode of television in which Matt Berry says he “sold his vocal rights to that spinning robot they sell to housewives and perverts.” So, y'know; There's only so harsh on it we can be."

Jack King of Vulture gave the episode a perfect 5 star rating out of 5 and wrote, "From filler to killer, that was a pretty densely packed episode. From major revelations in the pre- and postwar timelines, to some pretty insidious shit going down in Vault 4, right through to Walton Goggins keeping the badassery dialed up to 11."

Sean T. Collins of Decider wrote, "While far from a perfect episode of television — if I never see that goddamn blue-orange color scheme on a TV screen again it'll be too soon — this is a very well-structured one. Both Coop in the past and Lucy in the present go through the same slow journey of terrified disillusionment. They're both realizing that the society that made them the people they are, in which they believe, for which they’ve worked and fought and even killed, is a sick society, not a healthy one. What does that make them?" Ross Bonaime of Collider gave the episode an 8 out of 10 and wrote, "As we start to learn more about the world's infrastructure and get some answers, even more questions come up, yet not in a way that's frustrating or confusing. Instead, we simply want to engage with this universe even more to learn and understand. Episode 6 is an example of Fallout at its best, through its experiences before the bombs and what's going underground now."

Joshua Kristian McCoy of Game Rant gave the episode a 3.5 star rating out of 5 and wrote, ""The Trap" maintains the high standard of quality seen in every other episode of Fallout. Its strange digressions, some of which don't work out, feel like half-formed sidequests in one of the games. Every new reveal sets the stage for something more exciting. Every new domain escalates the stakes. Fallout is one of the best video game adaptations on the small screen without question. As weird as it gets, the show shows no signs of slowing down." Greg Wheeler of The Review Geek gave the episode a 4 star rating out of 5 and wrote, "Alas, the plot thickens. It seems like Vault 4 hides more than a few shocking surprised and Level 12 looks like the place where they turn either Surface Dwellers into monsters, or mutate those within the Vault to keep them in compliance. Either way, the mystery of the Vaults are partly what make this show work so well."
