= The Head (Fallout) =

- Fallout episode
- Episode no.: Season 1 Episode 3
- Directed by: Jonathan Nolan
- Written by: Geneva Robertson-Dworet; Graham Wagner
- Cinematography by: Stuart Dryburgh
- Editing by: Ali Comperchio; Yoni Reiss
- Original air date: April 10, 2024
- Running time: 57 minutes

Guest appearances
- Johnny Pemberton as Thaddeus; Frances Turner as Barb Howard; Leslie Uggams as Betty Pearson; Zach Cherry as Woody Thomas; Dave Register as Chet; Annabel O'Hagan as Stephanie Harper; Rodrigo Luzzi as Reg McPhee

Episode chronology
← Previous "The Target"	Next → "The Ghouls"
- Fallout season 1

"The Head" is the third episode of the first season of the American post-apocalyptic drama television series Fallout. The episode was written by series developers Geneva Robertson-Dworet and Graham Wagner and directed by executive producer Jonathan Nolan. It was released on Amazon Prime Video on April 10, 2024, alongside the rest of the season.

The series depicts the aftermath of an apocalyptic nuclear exchange in an alternate history of Earth where advances in nuclear technology after World War II led to the emergence of a retrofuturistic society and a subsequent resource war. The survivors took refuge in fallout shelters known as Vaults, built to preserve humanity in the event of nuclear annihilation. In the episode, Lucy has an unpleasant encounter with the Ghoul, while Maximus takes over Titus' identity.

The episode received positive reviews from critics, who praised the performances, writing and tension.

== Plot ==
Before the Great War, Cooper Howard films a Western movie and complains to the director about his character killing the villain. In the present day, the Ghoul finds Wilzig's headless corpse and sets out to follow Lucy after giving his scent to CX404. Lucy reaches the underwater remains of Hollywood Boulevard, where a mutated axolotl known as a gulper swallows Wilzig's head. As she escapes the gulper, she is held at gunpoint by the Ghoul.

Back in Filly, Maximus is forced to sell some teeth to pay to have his armor's radio module repaired, but encounters several scavengers attempting to steal the Power Armor. After initially struggling, Maximus regains control of the armor, kills the leader and chases the others off. Through the camcorder, he pretends to be Titus and claims that Maximus died in battle. The Brotherhood of Steel proceeds to send a new squire, Thaddeus, to assist him in his mission. Maximus hides in the armor and pretends to be Titus. As Thaddeus constantly bullied him at the camp, Maximus takes every opportunity to make his new squire's life difficult, only to change his mind when he learns that Thaddeus's bullying was motivated entirely by peer pressure.

The Ghoul begins submerging Lucy, claiming that he is using her as bait to attract the gulper. The gulper appears but quickly escapes when Lucy struggles and accidentally pulls some vials from the Ghoul's jacket, shattering them. The Ghoul is furious as he no longer has the chems that keep him from turning feral. He angrily sets CX404 loose and leaves with Lucy as his prisoner.

In Vault 33, the new co-overseers call a general hearing regarding the future of the raiders they have captured. Norm suggests that rehabilitation is a waste of time and that they should execute the prisoners. He is rebuked, but news of a water shortage due to the Vault's purification chip failing puts more pressure on the overseers to make a decision.

Sensing a high level of radiation, Maximus and Thaddeus reach Hollywood Boulevard, encountering the gulper. Thaddeus is almost swallowed whole, but Maximus intervenes and pulls Thaddeus out, causing the gulper to throw up the contents of its guts and killing itself in the process. Thaddeus and Maximus, recovering from the encounter, turn to see CX404 licking her deceased owner's head.

Lucy is held hostage by the Ghoul as they cross the desert. Lucy begs for water but her pleas go unheard.

In the past, Cooper's wife, Barb, gets him into contact with Vault-Tec, as Cooper is worried about his career declining. Agreeing to work as a spokesman and ambassador for the company, Cooper wears a Vault-Tec jumpsuit and goes to a photoshoot to advertise the Vault, at one point giving an impromptu thumbs up for a photo. It is implied that Vault-Tec's new mascot, the Vault Boy, is later modeled after Cooper.

== Production ==
=== Development ===
It was the third episode directed by executive producer Jonathan Nolan.

=== Music ===
The score is composed by Ramin Djawadi. The episode featured many songs, including "Maybe" by The Ink Spots, "So Doggone Lonesome" by Johnny Cash, "We'll Meet Again" by The Ink Spots, "Tweedlee Dee" by LaVern Baker, "In the Mood" by Glenn Miller, and "Act Naturally" by Buck Owens.

== Release ==
The episode, along with the rest of the season, premiered on April 10, 2024, on Amazon Prime Video. Originally, the season was scheduled to premiere on April 12, 2024.

== Critical reception ==
"The Head" received positive reviews from critics. William Hughes of The A.V. Club gave the episode a "B+" grade and wrote, "It's to Fallout's increasing credit that it can, in its third episode, do some real character work alongside its gleeful urge to gross out viewers. Take the early scene that sees Lucy chatting placidly with Wilzig's severed head, so recently liberated from his neck at his own request. Ella Purnell has a serious knack for projecting Lucy's cheerful acceptance of the horrors around her, curiously chatting with the head while hunting around for whatever MacGuffin is lurking under the skin."

Jack King of Vulture gave the episode a 4 star rating out of 5 and wrote, "Each glimpse we've been offered of Cooper Howard before the Great War shows him as a completely different entity to the (literal) ghoul he'll become. I mean, he's a virtuous family man who can't even stomach the idea of playing a good-guy sheriff who kills a bandit onscreen. But such is the moral decay of the apocalypse: Filling in the blanks, you can only imagine the heinous shit he has witnessed, and partaken in, since the nuclear firestorm. Still. To get to this level of brutality and barbarism? That's 200 years of real depravity right there."

Sean T. Collins of Decider wrote, "The pattern for Fallout after three episodes is that any given 50-minute installment will feature disgusting violence, sick jokes, and a monster of the week, based on the premise that America ain't shit because its ruling class would rather live in holes in the ground than improve the world we live in. Sure, I'll eat it." Ross Bonaime of Collider wrote, "For all the goofy, absurdist craziness of this Fallout universe, Episode 3 proves that the calmer, more character-focused installments are just as interesting, and can expand both the game's lore and the show's story in ways that demonstrate a love and appreciation for the larger universe."

Joshua Kristian McCoy of Game Rant gave the episode a 4 star rating out of 5 and wrote, "Fallout has some sluggish moments, but it's a refreshingly straightforward series. Despite adapting decades of games, blending several genres, and telling such a broad story, it's a breezy ride through the wasteland. Fallout is everything fans hoped it would be. Its flaws barely shadow its successes. Video game adaptations rarely capture the spirit of their source material. Fallout had several challenges, but it's arguably one of the best of its kind. The show continues to impress as it delves deeper into the wasteland." Greg Wheeler of The Review Geek gave the episode a 3.5 star rating out of 5 and wrote, "As we approach the midway point of the show, this cat and mouse game has just started to get interesting. Quite what Wilzig's significance to the plot is, alongside the various characters who need his head (and how Moldaver ties into it) remains a mystery but it's an enticing one and certainly helps to keep things ticking over."
