= The End (Fallout) =

- Fallout episode
- Episode no.: Season 1 Episode 1
- Directed by: Jonathan Nolan
- Written by: Geneva Robertson-Dworet; Graham Wagner
- Cinematography by: Stuart Dryburgh
- Editing by: Ali Comperchio
- Original air date: April 10, 2024
- Running time: 74 minutes

Guest appearances
- Sarita Choudhury as Lee Moldaver; Leslie Uggams as Betty Pearson; Michael Cristofer as Elder Cleric Quintus; Johnny Pemberton as Thaddeus; Mykelti Williamson as Honcho; Matt Berry as Mr. Handy; Zach Cherry as Woody Thomas; Annabel O'Hagan as Stephanie Harper; Dave Register as Chet; Rodrigo Luzzi as Reg McPhee; Cameron Cowperthwaite as Monty; Jacinto Taras Riddick as Cleric Felix; Joel Marsh Garland as Biggie; Mike Doyle as Bob Spencer; Janie Brookshire as Mrs. Spencer

Episode chronology
← Previous —	Next → "The Target"
- Fallout season 1

"The End" is the series premiere of the American post-apocalyptic drama television series Fallout. The episode was written by series developers Geneva Robertson-Dworet and Graham Wagner and directed by executive producer Jonathan Nolan. It was released on Amazon Prime Video on April 10, 2024, alongside the rest of the season.

The series depicts the aftermath of an apocalyptic nuclear exchange in an alternate history of Earth where advances in nuclear technology after World War II led to the emergence of a retrofuturistic society and a subsequent resource war. The survivors took refuge in fallout shelters known as Vaults, built to preserve humanity in the event of nuclear annihilation. The first episode of the first season, it follows Lucy MacLean (Ella Purnell), a young woman who leaves behind her home in Vault 33 to venture out into the dangerously unforgiving wasteland of a devastated Los Angeles to look for her father Hank (Kyle MacLachlan).

The series premiere received positive reviews from critics, who praised Nolan's directing, performances and production design.

== Plot ==
=== Prologue: The End ===
On October 23, 2077, at a birthday party in Los Angeles, famous actor Cooper Howard (Walton Goggins) entertains the children with his cowboy tricks, while the adults are distracted by news reports regarding a possible nuclear threat. As the kids go inside for cake, Cooper converses with his daughter Janey (Teagan Meredith) over his reluctance in raising his thumb for a photograph based on his experiences as a Marine; he was taught that a mushroom cloud larger than the apparent size of one's thumb would inevitably be deadly. An atomic bomb hits the city in the distance, sending a shockwave towards the house. The attack causes pandemonium and the partygoers flee, with some trying to enter a fallout shelter, only to be fought off by the homeowner. Cooper takes his daughter and flees on horseback while more bombs hit the city, as Earth experiences a nuclear holocaust.

=== Part 1: Lucy ===
219 years later, groups of humanity have been living in underground colonies known as "Vaults", built by Vault-Tec to "preserve American society in the event of nuclear war". A young woman, Lucy MacLean (Ella Purnell), is a model Vault Dweller and the daughter of Vault 33's Overseer, Hank MacLean (Kyle MacLachlan). Wanting to get married, she convinces a special council to grant her a wedding with a man from the neighboring Vault 32. After the wedding, Lucy and her new husband Monty (Cameron Cowperthwaite) consummate their marriage. Meanwhile, Lucy's younger brother Norm (Moisés Arias) becomes suspicious of the visitors from Vault 32 and investigates the empty Vault. He discovers that Vault 32 has been ransacked and finds the mutilated corpse of a Vault Dweller.

Shortly afterwards, the newcomers from Vault 32 begin to murder Vault 33 residents, and after detecting high levels of radiation from her Pip-Boy, Lucy realizes the visitors are actually raiders from the surface. Monty becomes aggressive and brutally attacks Lucy, stabbing her in the abdomen. Despite her severe injury, she manages to strike him back, slicing his face and throat with broken glass. After injecting herself with a Stimpak, Lucy rushes to the main reception area to find the raiders viciously attacking the Vault residents. Monty ambushes her, but Hank attacks him from behind and drowns him. They run into Lee Moldaver (Sarita Choudhury), the leader of the raiders. Threatening Lucy's life, as well as several other Vault Dwellers, Moldaver drugs Hank and takes him to the surface. In the aftermath, Lucy resolves to find her father, and leaves Vault 33 with the help of Norm and their cousin Chet (Dave Register). She is astonished upon discovering the devastated remains of Los Angeles, having not known what natural sunlight looked or felt like until that moment.

=== Part 2: Maximus ===
The Brotherhood of Steel, an organization dedicated to securing pre-War technology, trains young people in a boot camp on the outskirts of Los Angeles. An aspirant, Maximus (Aaron Moten), is jealous when his friend Dane (Xelia Mendes-Jones) is selected to become a squire. However, Dane's candidacy is sabotaged when someone hides a razor blade in their boot, injuring them badly. Maximus is suspected, and in interrogation he admits that he considered it, but the Brotherhood chooses not to punish him when he professes a willingness to accept his fate. Maximus is named as squire to Knight Titus and is assigned with his troop in pursuing a scientist from the Enclave who has escaped with dangerous technology.

=== Part 3: The Ghoul ===
Under the cover of night, three bounty hunters sneak into a cemetery where they dig up "The Ghoul", a still alive and heavily mutated Cooper Howard, who has been held captive for several years by a gang boss named Dom Pedro. The bounty hunters, aware of the Ghoul's reputation as a killer and tracker, request his help in finding the Enclave scientist and offer to split his bounty. When they threaten him into agreeing, the Ghoul gleefully double-crosses them, killing two and burying the third alive in his empty grave. He then departs to find the scientist himself.

== Production ==
=== Development ===
In January 2022, Jonathan Nolan was confirmed to direct the first episode.

=== Music ===
The score is composed by Ramin Djawadi. The episode featured many songs, including "Orange Colored Sky" by Nat King Cole, "Don't Let the Stars Get in Your Eyes" by Perry Como, "Some Enchanted Evening" by The Castells, "So Doggone Lonesome" and "All Over Again" by Johnny Cash, and "Crawl Out Through The Fallout" by Sheldon Allman.

== Release ==
The episode, along with the rest of the season, premiered on April 10, 2024, on Amazon Prime Video. Originally, the season was scheduled to premiere on April 12, 2024.

== Critical reception ==
"The End" received positive reviews from critics. William Hughes of The A.V. Club gave the episode a "B" grade and wrote, "If these three chapters felt of a piece, or like they were meant to comment on each other — or even, honestly, like they came from the same TV show, period — the interpolation could have made for something special. As is, Fallout opens with one really strong episode with a couple of weaker ones jury-rigged to its frame. It's not the end of the world or anything — but a bummer, nevertheless."

Jack King of Vulture gave the episode a 4 star rating out of 5 and wrote, "Splitting its time between three different protagonists is a risk for Fallout, especially given the first season is just eight episodes. You fear that one of the characters may feel short-changed. So far, so good, and it's unsurprising we spend most of our time with Lucy as the most obvious audience surrogate. In my view, nevertheless, the episode leaves the best until last."

Sean T. Collins of Decider wrote, "If the Vault's environment is the work of a film projector anyway, a nice riff on Oklahoma!'s vivid Todd-AO splendor might have done the trick nicely. But while that may impact the show qualitatively, it doesn't impede its goals, which are to make a fun video-game show with a rated-R sense of humor, some gross-out stuff, and the occasional world-historical atrocity to remind us it's not always a good time. I'd say they did what they set out to do." Ross Bonaime of Collider wrote, "In just an hour, Fallout's first episode does an excellent job of seeding important information through the story while still leaving plenty to the imagination, as well as introducing these three characters, each with their own unique perception of the world."

Joshua Kristian McCoy of Game Rant gave the episode a 3.5 star rating out of 5 and wrote, ""The End" is a solid beginning, but it clearly presages something much more enjoyable for Fallout's future." Greg Wheeler of The Review Geek gave the episode a 4 star rating out of 5 and wrote, "The first episode of Fallout gets off to a decent start, with a loot [sic] at several different characters. This actually works surprisingly well to split the focus between different people and understand more of the world and how it all slots together."
