= The Ghouls (Fallout) =

- Fallout episode
- Episode no.: Season 1 Episode 4
- Directed by: Daniel Gray Longino
- Written by: Kieran Fitzgerald
- Cinematography by: Stuart Dryburgh; Teodoro Maniaci
- Editing by: Yoni Reiss
- Original air date: April 10, 2024
- Running time: 49 minutes

Guest appearances
- Matt Berry as Snip Snip; Leslie Uggams as Betty Pearson; Neal Huff as Roger; Michael Esper as Bud Askins; Zach Cherry as Woody Thomas; Dave Register as Chet; Annabel O'Hagan as Stephanie Harper; Rodrigo Luzzi as Reg McPhee; Matty Cardarople as Huey; Elvis Valentino Lopez as Squirrel

Episode chronology
← Previous "The Head"	Next → "The Past"
- Fallout season 1

"The Ghouls" is the fourth episode of the first season of the American post-apocalyptic drama television series Fallout. The episode was written by co-executive producer Kieran Fitzgerald and directed by co-executive producer Daniel Gray Longino. It was released on Amazon Prime Video on April 10, 2024, alongside the rest of the season.

The series depicts the aftermath of an apocalyptic nuclear exchange in an alternate history of Earth where advances in nuclear technology after World War II led to the emergence of a retrofuturistic society and a subsequent resource war. The survivors took refuge in fallout shelters known as Vaults, built to preserve humanity in the event of nuclear annihilation. In the episode, Lucy is traded by Howard to organ harvesters, while Norm discovers secrets at Vault 32.

The episode received positive reviews from critics, who praised the character development and pacing.

== Plot ==
The Ghoul marches Lucy through the wasteland. He visits an old friend, Roger, who is about to turn feral due to his chems running out. The Ghoul stays with him in his last moments, and when Roger reminisces over a happy memory, the Ghoul abruptly kills him with a gunshot, sparing him from his inevitable fate. He then starts eating Roger's corpse, repulsing Lucy. Later, Lucy feels forced to drink irradiated water, having no other choice. She fights the Ghoul and bites his finger off. In retaliation, he cuts off one of her fingers with a knife.

In Vault 33, elections are nearing to name a new overseer. Norm, however, begins to suspect something happened at Vault 32, especially after talking with an imprisoned raider. When he is denied access to the Vault's records, he and Chet decide to sneak into Vault 32 and investigate. They are horrified to discover rotting corpses, most of which have been dead for years, and evidence that the Dwellers killed each other. They also discover the words "Death to management" and "We know the truth" written in blood. Norm is also shocked to discover that the raiders entered using his mother Rose's Pip-Boy.

In Los Angeles, the Ghoul takes Lucy to an abandoned supermarket. He speaks to "Snip Snip", a homicidal Mister Handy robot who has gained sentience, and trades Lucy to it in exchange for chems. Shortly after the deal is completed, the Ghoul collapses from drug withdrawal.

Snip Snip replaces Lucy's finger, and reveals his plan to harvest her organs before trying to kill her. She fights back, disables Snip Snip, and releases several captured ghouls. Martha, an almost feral ghoul, then attacks Lucy, forcing her to kill for the first time. In the aftermath, Lucy takes some of the chems, and, despite his actions, gives them to the barely conscious Ghoul before leaving. The Ghoul composes himself and raids Snip Snip's hideout for more chems and weapons. He then puts on a tape of one of his old movies and, while reminiscing, attempts to copy his finger-gun motion, only to remember he is missing his finger.

== Production ==
=== Music ===
The score is composed by Ramin Djawadi. The episode featured many songs, including "Let's Go Sunning" by Jack Shaindlin, "It Ain't the Meat (It's the Motion)" by The Swallows, "Journey Into Melody" by Sam Fonteyn, and "I Can Dream, Can't I?" by The Andrews Sisters.

== Release ==
The episode, along with the rest of the season, premiered on April 10, 2024, on Amazon Prime Video. Originally, the season was scheduled to premiere on April 12, 2024.

== Critical reception ==
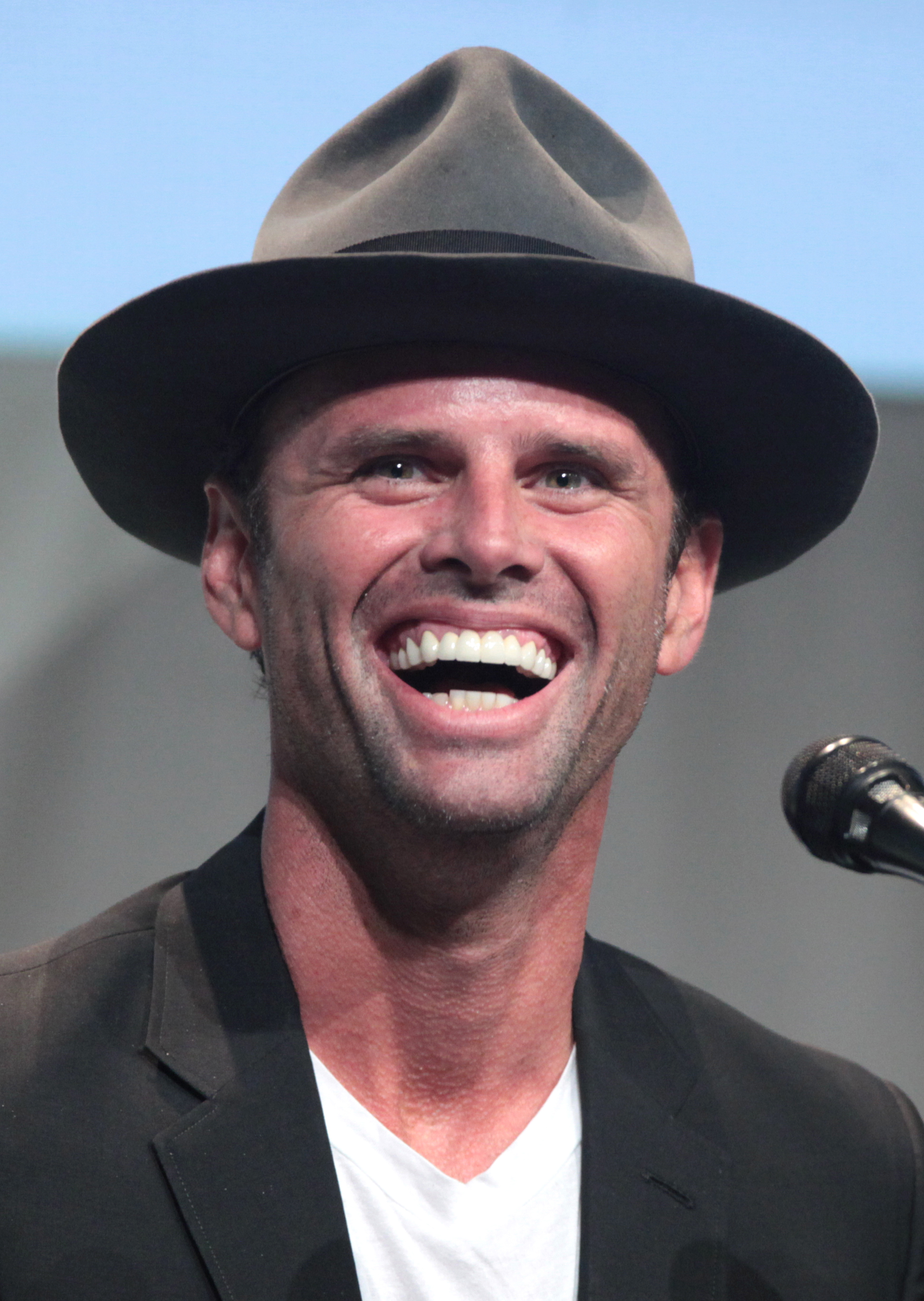
Walton Goggins's performance in this episode garnered an Emmy nomination for Outstanding Lead Actor in a Drama Series.

"The Ghouls" received positive reviews from critics. William Hughes of The A.V. Club gave the episode an "A–" grade and wrote, "this episode is something of a twofer: We not only get Chet and Norm investigating the ruins of Vault 32, but also Lucy clearing a classic Fallout dungeon (an abandoned supermarket) after the Ghoul sells her to two of the most affable organ harvesters we've ever seen on TV. That also means we get plenty of time with Matt Berry as cheerful dissection-bot Snip-Snip and Fallout's most fucked-up sex scene since the last one, so, honestly, what's not to like?"

Jack King of Vulture gave the episode a 4-star rating out of 5 and wrote, "Lucy's ordeal with the Ghoul would be enough to test anyone's resolve, but this episode was the first where he really sought to put her through the ringer [sic]. Her descent into the dark heart of the Super Duper Mart is a crucible that strips away what was left of her innocence."

Sean T. Collins of Decider wrote, "There's no Maximus material in this episode, so it's a little bit off model in that respect. Nevertheless, I'm starting to sound like a broken record, but gnarly violence, fun monsters, solid jokes, and a dirty mind seem to be a winning formula for Fallout. That's even with director Daniel Gray Longino and writer Kieran Fitzgerald taking over from the initial team of Jonathan Nolan, Geneva Robertson-Dworet, and Graham Wagner. Each episode feels like starting the beginning of a new level." Ross Bonaime of Collider gave the episode a 7 out of 10 and wrote, "Even in an episode that mostly takes place in a trashed grocery store, we can take that as a microcosm of the larger Fallout world outside those doors. Between this installment and the previous one, Fallout excels at expanding our view by focusing on smaller-scale stories that explore the harsh truths about its world."

Joshua Kristian McCoy of Game Rant gave the episode a 4-star rating out of 5 and wrote, "Fallout continues to outdo itself. Without its source material, it would be a thrilling post-apocalyptic action series. With it, the show likely becomes the best entry since New Vegas. While some elements fall flat, every entry in Fallout has been a delight to watch. This will be a binge-watching hit. "The Ghoul" stands as a fascinating exploration of the titular monster and the humanity they once laid claim to." Greg Wheeler of The Review Geek gave the episode a 3.5 star rating out of 5 and wrote, "Exploring the different vaults and uncovering the stories on the computers are some of the best subplot storytelling outside of Fallout: New Vegas' plots and intricate writing so it's definitely a welcome inclusion."

Walton Goggins submitted the episode to support his Emmy nomination for Outstanding Lead Actor in a Drama Series.
