= The Target (Fallout) =

- Fallout episode
- Episode no.: Season 1 Episode 2
- Directed by: Jonathan Nolan
- Written by: Geneva Robertson-Dworet; Graham Wagner
- Cinematography by: Stuart Dryburgh
- Editing by: Ali Comperchio
- Original air date: April 10, 2024
- Running time: 65 minutes

Guest appearances
- Michael Emerson as Dr. Siggi Wilzig; Michael Rapaport as Knight Titus; Michael Abbott Jr. as Farmer; Jon Daly as Snake Oil Salesman; Jake Garber as Chicken Collector; Dale Dickey as Ma June; Edythe Jason as Barv

Episode chronology
← Previous "The End"	Next → "The Head"
- Fallout season 1

"The Target" is the second episode of the first season of the American post-apocalyptic drama television series Fallout. The episode was written by series developers Geneva Robertson-Dworet and Graham Wagner and directed by executive producer Jonathan Nolan. It was released on Amazon Prime Video on April 10, 2024, alongside the rest of the season.

The series depicts the aftermath of an apocalyptic nuclear exchange in an alternate history of Earth where advances in nuclear technology after World War II led to the emergence of a retrofuturistic society and a subsequent resource war. The survivors took refuge in fallout bunkers known as Vaults, built to preserve humanity in the event of nuclear annihilation. The episode follows Lucy on her search for her father, Maximus tasked with locating a dangerous scientist, and the Ghoul on the hunt for a bounty.

The episode received positive reviews from critics, with praise towards the directing, writing, and performances.

== Plot ==
Dr. Siggi Wilzig is a scientist working at an Enclave facility, performing behaviour experiments on dogs. He takes pity on one of the new puppies, CX404, after it fails its weight test, saving it from incineration. Soon after, Wilzig rescues the dog from further experimentation, and raises CX404 in secret. Wilzig develops a mysterious glowing pill, which he injects into his neck. CX404 is discovered in his lab by an Enclave scientist; the scientist quickly raises the alarm and attacks Wilzig but is killed by CX404. Both soon flee the facility.

Lucy explores the coastal ruins near Vault 33 and finds a bottle of 'Plan D', a Vault-Tec suicide poison that was ingested by a deceased family. As she spends her first night in the Wasteland, her fire attracts the attention of Wilzig and CX404. After saving her from a mutated giant cockroach predator, Wilzig cautions her to return to Vault 33 and warns her that she will otherwise have to adapt to the harshness of the surface. The next day, Lucy seeks information about her father's whereabouts and is given directions to the nearby settlement of Filly. Wilzig later stops at a hazardous waste dumping site for a short rest. He is alarmed to find bones and human remains at the site and quickly leaves.

Maximus travels with Knight Titus and his escort on the mission to hunt down Wilzig and struggles with Titus' callous attitude. After deploying down to the ground due to Titus' impatience, he and Maximus travel on foot, locating the waste site as well as evidence of Wilzig's recent presence. While investigating the site, a Yao Guai bear appears and attacks them. Titus flees from the bear and is soon brutally mauled before Maximus kills the creature. Titus demands that Maximus heal his injuries, threatening that he will be punished for letting him get injured. In response, Maximus tells Titus that he does not deserve to be a Knight, allowing him to succumb to his injuries. Maximus acquires Titus' T-60 Power Armor, and later discovers just how powerful it is, after launching a brick at high speed toward a structure, partially collapsing it. Maximus approaches and dissipates a fight between two men, and finds out soon after that the fight had occurred due to one of the men sexually assaulting some chickens.

Lucy locates the town of Filly and asks shopkeeper Ma June about Lee Moldaver, the leader of the raiders who kidnapped her father. Ma June warns her to return to her vault, expressing hatred for those who were fortunate to be in the Vaults when the bombs fell. Wilzig and CX404 arrive in Filly, looking to speak to Ma June, and he once again warns Lucy to return home. To Lucy's confusion, Wilzig demonstrates a thorough understanding of Vault 33's design. Suddenly, the Ghoul reveals himself and declares that he is here for Wilzig's bounty. A firefight erupts in the town, and Wilzig loses a foot. The Ghoul wounds CX404 after it tries to defend Wilzig, and Lucy attempts to neutralize the Ghoul. Just as the Ghoul is about to dispatch Lucy, Maximus appears and engages in a fight against the Ghoul.

Ma June reveals to Lucy that she was paid by Moldaver to transport Wilzig to the raider's location. At Wilzig's insistence, Ma June asks Lucy to take him to Moldaver, as a way to find her father. Maximus is beaten by the Ghoul, due to his inexperience with the Power Armor, and abruptly flies out of Filly due to a lack of understanding of the armor's thrusters. The Ghoul later heals CX404 to help him locate Wilzig. Traveling towards Los Angeles, Wilzig struggles with his injuries. He informs Lucy that he has taken a Vault-Tec 'Plan D' suicide pill, and tasks her with removing his head and taking it to Moldaver, promising that it will "change the future." Wilzig dies, and reluctantly, Lucy prepares to decapitate him.

== Production ==
=== Development ===
Like the series premiere, the second episode was directed by executive producer Jonathan Nolan.

=== Filming ===
Much of the wasteland scenes for this episode, including the ruined homes and ship, were filmed in Namibia's Skeleton Coast.

=== Music ===
The score is composed by Ramin Djawadi.

The episode featured many songs, including "Into Each Life Some Rain Must Fall" by The Ink Spots and Ella Fitzgerald, "Don't Fence Me In" by Bing Crosby and The Andrews Sisters, "It's a Man" by Betty Hutton, and "I Don't Want to Set the World on Fire" by The Ink Spots.

== Release ==
The episode, along with the rest of the season, premiered on Amazon Prime Video on April 10, 2024. Originally, the season was scheduled to premiere on April 12, 2024.

== Critical reception ==
"The Target" received positive reviews from critics. William Hughes of The A.V. Club gave the episode an "A" grade and wrote, "The premiere showed that this creative team could assemble the rough building blocks for a really great Fallout show; episode two makes it clear that they actually have a pretty decent idea of what they're trying to build."

Jack King of Vulture gave the episode 4 out of 5 stars, praising Purnell's performance as Lucy as she navigates her hostile new environment. He wrote, "A central question of postapocalyptic media...will always center on how we deal with the threat of other human beings after civilization has rotted away. With resources stretched so thin and the lion's share of those left around relying on their basal survival instincts to get by, everyone becomes a potential risk."

Sean T. Collins of Decider wrote, "Compared to incinerating the planet, incinerating a puppy is a pretty low-stakes way to open an episode. Nevertheless, it's an attention-getter, and thus did the second episode of Fallout get my attention." Ross Bonaime of Collider wrote, "Only two episodes in, Fallout is finding a great blend of the game world and its own story, crafting an intriguing and uncertain future."

Joshua Kristian McCoy of Game Rant gave the episode a 4 star rating out of 5 and wrote, ""The Target" announces the series' aptitude for action, comedy, and storytelling. While it isn't a groundbreaking new experience, Fallout is a fun show worth seeking out. It's an excellent binge-watch if nothing else." Greg Wheeler of The Review Geek gave the episode a 4 star rating out of 5 and wrote, "Fallout is just starting to get interesting and there's a lot of variation to the environment too. As a nitpick there's perhaps a bit too much greenery for the familiar murky greys and yellows that are usually within Fallout's palette but it doesn't detract from the story."
