= Fallout season 3 =

Fallout
- Season 3
- Showrunners: Graham Wagner; Geneva Robertson-Dworet
- Starring: Ella Purnell; Aaron Moten; Walton Goggins; Kyle MacLachlan; Moisés Arias; Frances Turner; Annabel O'Hagan; Dave Register; Aaron Paul

Release
- Original network: Amazon Prime Video

Season chronology
- ← Previous; Season 2

The third season of the American post-apocalyptic drama television series Fallout, based on the role-playing video game franchise created by Tim Cain and Leonard Boyarsky, (Note: Fallout was created by Tim Cain and Leonard Boyarsky, and developed by Black Isle Studios, and formerly published by Interplay Entertainment from 1997 to 2004. It has been owned by ZeniMax Media and developed by Bethesda Game Studios since 2007.) the series is set two centuries after the Great War of 2077, in which society has collapsed following a nuclear holocaust. It is set to be released on Amazon Prime Video.

The season stars Ella Purnell, Aaron Moten, Walton Goggins, Kyle MacLachlan, Moisés Arias, Frances Turner, Annabel O'Hagan, Dave Register, and Aaron Paul.

== Cast and characters ==
=== Main ===
- Ella Purnell as Lucy MacLean, a former Vault 33 Dweller
- Aaron Moten as Maximus, a former knight of the Brotherhood of Steel
- Walton Goggins as Cooper Howard / The Ghoul, a Hollywood actor and Vault-Tec ambassador before the Great War, who mutated into a ghoul and is now a gunslinger and bounty hunter
- Kyle MacLachlan as Hank MacLean, Lucy and Norm's father and former Overseer of Vault 33
- Moisés Arias as Norm MacLean, former Vault 33 resident and Lucy's younger brother
- Frances Turner as Barb Howard, Cooper's wife and high-ranking Vault-Tec executive
- Annabel O'Hagan as Stephanie Harper, Vault 32 Overseer
- Dave Register as Chet, Lucy and Norm's cousin and a Vault 32 resident
- Aaron Paul

=== Recurring ===
- Manny Jacinto
- Emily Mortimer
- Thomasin McKenzie

== Episodes ==
Frederick E. O. Toye will direct episodes of the season.

== Production ==
=== Development ===
On May 12, 2025, Amazon renewed the series for a third season.

=== Casting ===
Main cast members returning from previous seasons include Ella Purnell as Lucy MacLean, Aaron Moten as Maximus, Walton Goggins as Cooper Howard / The Ghoul, Kyle MacLachlan as Hank MacLean, Moisés Arias as Norm MacLean, and Frances Turner as Barb Howard.

In May 2026, Aaron Paul joined the cast in an undisclosed role, while Annabel O'Hagan and Dave Register, reprising their respective roles from previous seasons as Stephanie Harper and Chet, were promoted to series regulars. In June, Manny Jacinto, Emily Mortimer, and Thomasin McKenzie joined the cast in recurring capacities.

=== Filming ===
Principal photography began on July 7, 2026 in Los Angeles. Filming was previously scheduled to begin in June.

== Release ==
The season is set to premiere on Amazon Prime Video.
