= Fallout (soundtrack) =

Fallout (Original Amazon Series Soundtrack)

Soundtrack album by Ramin Djawadi
- Released: April 8, 2024
- Recorded: 2023–2024
- Length: 72:45
- Label: Amazon Content Services
- Producer: Ramin Djawadi

Ramin Djawadi chronology
3 Body Problem (2024)	Fallout (Original Amazon Series Soundtrack) (2024)	House of the Dragon: Season 2 (2024)

Fallout (Original Amazon Series Soundtrack) is the soundtrack to the first season of the post-apocalyptic drama television series Fallout, based on the video game franchise of the same name and produced for Amazon Prime Video. The soundtrack features musical score composed by Ramin Djawadi and was released through Amazon Content Services on April 8, 2024.

== Development ==
In January 2024, it was announced that Ramin Djawadi was hired to compose music for the series. When the showrunner and executive producer Jonathan Nolan was looking for a composer, he chose Djawadi as they share a working relationship, having worked on Person of Interest (2011–2016) and Westworld (2016–2022). Djawadi, Nolan, Geneva Robertson-Dworet and Graham Wagner brainstormed on developing a sonic landscape that would pay homage to Inon Zur's series of compositions for the video game, and also wanted to produce a more serious tone unlike the humor present in the series which went out of their way as "the writing and acting were so great that the comedy really played on its own and didn't need any support musically". Despite the post-apocalyptic setting, the visual treatment and the sonic landscape, which consisted of diegetic music, were from the 1950s, hence the score had to match the series' tone.

The second objective is to develop the themes for the three main characters: The Ghoul (Walton Goggins), Lucy (Ella Purnell) and Maximus (Aaron Moten). The Ghoul's Western gunslinger vibe had let Djawadi to look on Ennio Morricone's themes for inspiration; however, he wanted to provide a "deconstructed, detuned, rusty soundscape". Lucy's theme provided a different musical style which had a clean, orchestral approach, though it merged with the Ghoul's themes as her journey became darker. For Maximus, who was the member of the Brotherhood of Steel, Djawadi adopted a "mechanical, heroic, militaristic approach" which resulted in the use of percussions and French horns. As the show progresses, Djawadi's score becomes more intricate which blends different themes and styles.

The Brotherhood of Steel theme had to be filled with tension as their environment was an uneasy one. To create that, Djawadi produced a percussive rattle through synthesizers. He provided vocals for Maximus' theme that almost felt like a religious feel, but Djawadi did not want it to sound like a traditional church choir, hence, he decided to use the vocals and then pinch them down to provide a darker feel. The use of French horn was to reflect the heroic side of the members, and he further added bass and harmonies in the cue.

The score featured more ambient and non-orchestral moments, where he would either used solo instruments or synthesizers or percussion instruments. He used minimal orchestra in the score, but as all the plots and characters come together, the score provides an orchestral feel.

== Release ==
The Fallout soundtrack featuring 21 cues from Djawadi's score was released through Amazon Content Services on April 8, 2024, two days prior to the show's release. Amazon and Mondo announced the vinyl records of the score; released in a double-LP album of "Opaque Canary Yellow" and "Opaque Sky Blue" variants and packaged in a color sleeve featuring the teaser posters of Lucy and the Ghoul. The pre-orders for the vinyl edition was issued on May 1, 2024, and it is scheduled for release in August 2024.

== Critical reception ==
Mimi Anthikkad Chibber of The Hindu summarized that "Ramin Djawadi does a great job with the score". Therese Lacson of Collider called it as "a stunning score by legendary composer Ramin Djawadi". Nicholas Quah of Vulture wrote "Ramin Djawadi's score, which carries hints of [Trent] Reznor and [Atticus] Ross, drones with excellence." Alex Maidy of JoBlo.com wrote "the score from Ramin Djawadi, which, like the games, combines Western and epic music." Niv M. Sultan of Slant Magazine called it as an "ominous score".

== Track listing ==
Fallout (Original Amazon Series Soundtrack) track listing
No.	Title	Length
1.	"Brotherhood of Steel" (full version)	6:27
2.	"The Ghoul"	5:41
3.	"Ice Cream and Apple Pie"	3:10
4.	"Vault 33"	4:54
5.	"Artifact"	3:22
6.	"Shady Sands"	3:27
7.	"Feo Fuerte y Formal"	2:05
8.	"Rebuild Together"	0:35
9.	"Surface Dweller Tradition"	4:43
10.	"Golden Rule"	2:22
11.	"Are You Compromised?"	3:14
12.	"I Hate It Up Here"	1:50
13.	"Bringing Order to the Wasteland"	3:16
14.	"Management"	1:55
15.	"Vault-Tec"	3:08
16.	"Think About the Future"	3:21
17.	"All the Answers"	8:26
18.	"Run for the Hills"	2:40
19.	"War Never Changes"	2:25
20.	"Do the Right Thing"	2:22
21.	"T-60"	3:22
Total length:		72:45

== Chart performance ==
Chart performance for Fallout (Original Amazon Series Soundtrack)
Chart (2024)	Peak position
Austrian Albums (Ö3 Austria)	39
UK Independent Albums (OCC)	27
UK Soundtrack Albums (OCC)	4

== Release history ==
Release dates and formats for Fallout (Original Amazon Series Soundtrack)
Region	Date	Format(s)	Label	Ref.
Various	July 24, 2024	Digital download; streaming	Amazon	
Various	July 26, 2024	Vinyl	Mondo	
