= The Past (Fallout) =

- Fallout episode
- Episode no.: Season 1 Episode 5
- Directed by: Clare Kilner
- Written by: Carson Mell
- Cinematography by: Alejandro Martinez
- Editing by: Micah Gardner
- Original air date: April 10, 2024
- Running time: 45 minutes

Guest appearances
- Johnny Pemberton as Thaddeus; Leslie Uggams as Betty Pearson; Zach Cherry as Woody Thomas; Annabel O'Hagan as Stephanie Harper; Dave Register as Chet; Rodrigo Luzzi as Reg McPhee

Episode chronology
← Previous "The Ghouls"	Next → "The Trap"
- Fallout season 1

"The Past" is the fifth episode of the first season of the American post-apocalyptic drama television series Fallout. The episode was written by co-executive producer Carson Mell and directed by Clare Kilner. It was released on Amazon Prime Video on April 10, 2024, alongside the rest of the season.

The series depicts the aftermath of an apocalyptic nuclear exchange in an alternate history of Earth where advances in nuclear technology after World War II led to the emergence of a retrofuturistic society and a subsequent resource war. The survivors took refuge in fallout shelters known as Vaults, built to preserve humanity in the event of nuclear annihilation. In the episode, Lucy and Maximus meet and decide to team up, while the elections take place at Vault 33.

The episode received positive reviews from critics, who praised the episode's dark tone and focus on the Vault's storyline.

== Plot ==
In Los Angeles, Maximus brands Thaddeus with a mark of honor for his actions with the gulper before revealing his true identity. Enraged at his deception, Thaddeus disables Maximus's power armor by stealing the fusion core, trapping him inside, and leaves with Wilzig's head as well as CX404. By the following morning, Lucy encounters Maximus and helps him in getting released from the armor. Realizing they can both benefit from the head, they agree to work together in tracking it.

In Vault 33, the elections for the new overseer take place. With a 98% majority, Betty Pearson is selected. As her first order, she announces a plan to repopulate Vault 32 with Vault 33's citizens after cleaning and restoring it to full order. Norm secretly hacks Vault 32's central computer and finds that Vault 31 has provided the overseers, including his father, for 32 and 33 since the day the bombs fell.

Leaving Los Angeles, Lucy and Maximus discover the remains of Shady Sands, a former post-war city destroyed years earlier. While Maximus is devastated as he recalls the deaths of his parents, Lucy laments her ignorance and that of her fellow Dwellers, as they had believed the claims of the Overseers that no civilization existed outside of the Vaults.

As they continue walking through the area, they stumble upon two local raiders. Lucy tries but fails to persuade them to pass peacefully. Maximus is wounded when he fires and kills them, sensing their betrayal and then identifying them as "Fiends", or cannibals. His wound worsens, forcing them to seek medical supplies at an old Vault-Tec office building masquerading as a hospital. However, they are both trapped and rendered unconscious. When they awake, they discover that they are now in a populated Vault.

== Production ==
=== Music ===
The score was composed by Ramin Djawadi. The episode features many songs, including "Henry" by The Jet-Tones, "Robin in the Pine" by Bonnie Guitar, "Ladyfingers" by Herb Alpert, "What a Diff'rence a Day Makes" by Dinah Washington, and "It's Just a Matter of Time" by Brook Benton.

== Release ==
The episode, along with the rest of the season, premiered on April 10, 2024, on Amazon Prime Video. Originally, the season was scheduled to premiere on April 12, 2024.

== Critical reception ==
"The Past" received positive reviews from critics. William Hughes of The A.V. Club gave the episode an "A" grade and wrote, "'The Past' is a heavy hour of television, but in all honesty, Fallout was probably due for one. The show still slips in some goofiness around the sides, whether it's in the wobble of Vault 33's ridiculous Jell-O cakes, or Pemberton's insistent glee on getting a big burning “T” placed on his neck. But the show isn't shying away from the darker aspects of this franchise as it moves into its back half, and it's produced one of its most memorable, irresistible installments to date."

Jack King of Vulture gave the episode a 3 star rating out of 5 and wrote, "As it's revealed toward the end of the episode, at some point in the last few decades, Shady Sands was destroyed, ostensibly in a nuclear blast. It's a decision that will undoubtedly prompt vociferous debate online. It's also a pretty ballsy move that you have to respect, assuming it pays off."

Sean T. Collins of Decider wrote, "each episode of Fallout feels like reaching a new level, or unlocking a new area, or launching a new side quest. This, perhaps, is how to adapt video games: Translate their iterative structure into episodic storytelling in the old television tradition, with cliffhangers to keep things going." Ross Bonaime of Collider gave the episode a 7 out of 10 and wrote, "This is another in a series of episodes that focus more on setting up dynamics and larger mysteries, but like the previous installments that have worked in this same way, Fallout shows that this is just as compelling as absurd action and bonkers violence. Sometimes, it's just as exciting to watch two people come together with a common goal of finding a decapitated [sic] head."

Joshua Kristian McCoy of Game Rant gave the episode a 3.5 star rating out of 5 and wrote, "Fallout feels shockingly sure of itself as it enters its back half. Jonathan Nolan and Lisa Joy knew what they had with this project, guaranteeing an impressive showcase for a rare successful video game adaptation." Greg Wheeler of The Review Geek gave the episode a 4 star rating out of 5 and wrote, "There's actually a lot to like with this story, and the way everything seems to be coming together is gearing up for this mystery inside the Vault revealing itself to be more sinister than we first realized. Fallout has been a compelling watch and the ending does hint that we’ve got lots more drama to come."
