= Dogmeat =

Dogmeat may refer to

- Dog meat, regarding the human consumption of dog flesh and parts
- Dog food, meat eaten by dogs themselves
- Dogmeat (Fallout), a recurring character in the Fallout franchise
