= Ghoul (TV character) =

TV character

The Ghoul
- Fallout character
- The Ghoul as he appears in the television series
- First appearance: "The End S1 E1"; Fallout; 2024
- Created by: Graham Wagner; Geneva Robertson-Dworet
- Portrayed by: Walton Goggins

In-universe information
- Full name: Cooper Howard
- Alias: The Ghoul
- Species: Ghoul; Human (formerly)
- Gender: Male
- Occupation: Bounty hunter Actor (formerly); U.S. Marine (formerly)
- Spouse: Barb Howard (ex-wife)
- Children: Janey Howard (daughter)
- Origin: Los Angeles
- Nationality: American

Cooper Howard, known as the Ghoul, is a fictional character from the sci-fi Western television series Fallout, itself based on the franchise of role-playing games of the same name. He is portrayed by American actor Walton Goggins.

The character is a member of a race of post-human beings called "ghouls", humans whose appearances were greatly disfigured by radiation following an apocalyptic nuclear exchange. The Ghoul is a bounty hunter wandering the post-apocalyptic wasteland who comes into conflict with Lucy MacLean over the course of the show. Extensive flashbacks also depict his past as Cooper Howard, a Hollywood actor and spokesman for Vault-Tec in the year 2077.

The Ghoul has received acclaim from both critics and audiences, with praise directed towards his characterization, visual design, and Goggins' performance. In 2024, Goggins was nominated for the Primetime Emmy Award for Outstanding Lead Actor in a Drama Series for his performance in Fallout.

== Concept and creation ==
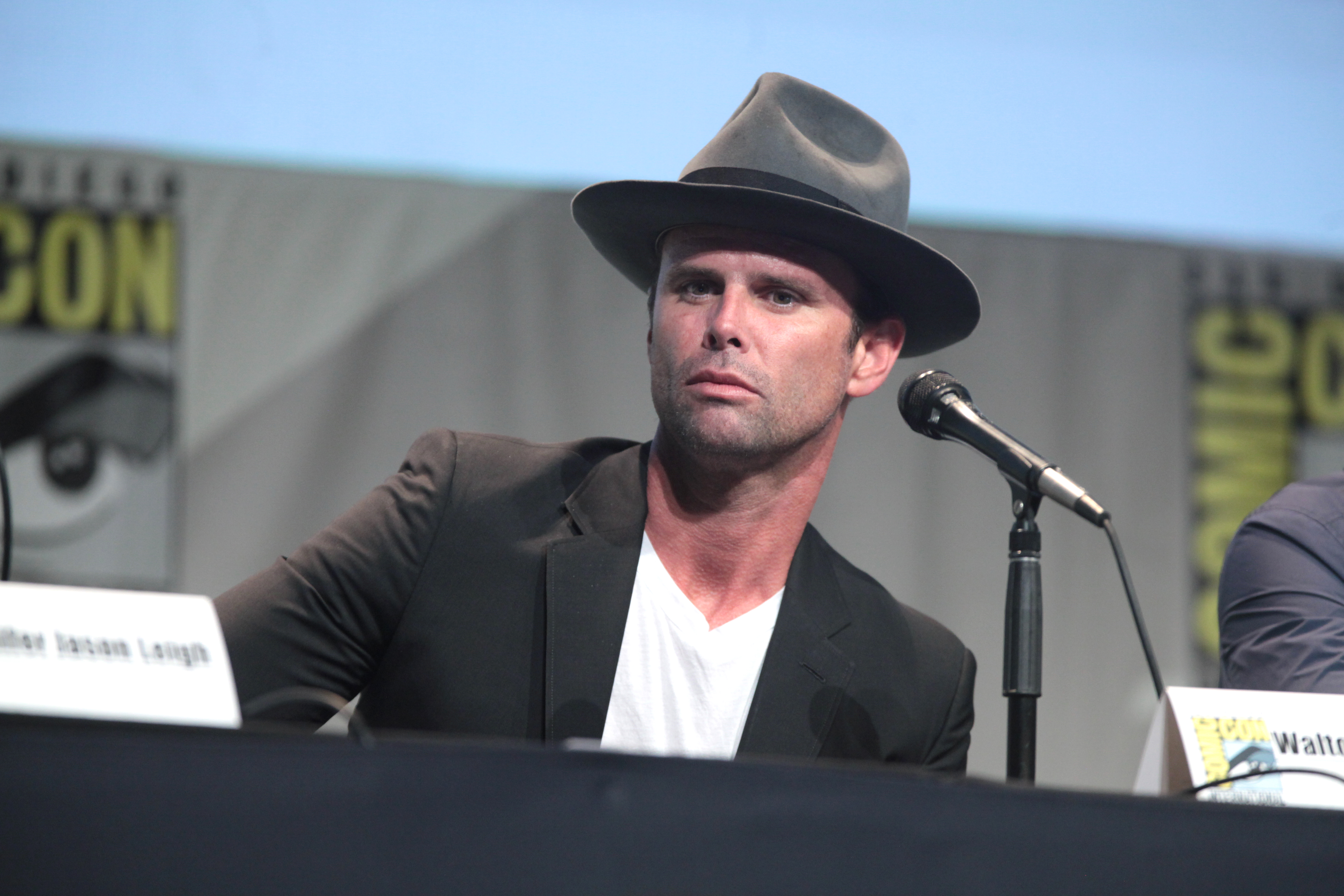
Walton Goggins portrays the Ghoul and Cooper Howard in the series

In February 2022, Variety reported that Walton Goggins had been cast in a leading role as a ghoul in Prime Video's then-upcoming TV adaptation of the Fallout game series. Goggins was the first choice to play the character. Showrunner Geneva Robertson-Dworet told IGN, "I think in our earliest conversations back in 2020, Graham [Wagner] and I were like, oh, if Walton Goggins played a ghoul in a Fallout show, I would totally watch that. That was one of our earliest creative decisions. And Graham and I have talked about how stupid that was in retrospect, because what if he'd been busy?" Goggins was originally led to believe that the role of the character would be akin to one of Fallout's player avatars, as Jonathan Nolan wanted Goggins to be surprised when he was told the extent of the Ghoul's character.

Nolan struggled with the Ghoul's visual design. He wanted the character to match the mutated appearance of Ghouls from the games but also wanted the audience to find him attractive and charismatic rather than repulsive. Goggins said, "The thing that was most important for I think all of us was to not have the audience kind of repulsed by this experience, to not have them look away from the experience, but rather to lean into the roadmap of his face as almost a journey of a person who has been walking in an irradiated, post-apocalyptic kind of landscape for 200 years." Jake Garber, the lead makeup artist on the character, wished to move away from designing grotesque characters, but signed onto the project when he learned that the character was meant to have more humanity. The Ghoul's lack of a nose was depicted by a special piece that was placed onto Goggins during filming. The piece had dots on it that allowed the nose to be digitally removed later. According to Nolan, the typical grotesqueness of the ghouls from the games was deliberately toned down for the character so Goggins would be able to emote. He told Vanity Fair, "I need to be able to see Walton and his performance, he needs to look like a Ghoul from the game, and he needs to be kind of hot."

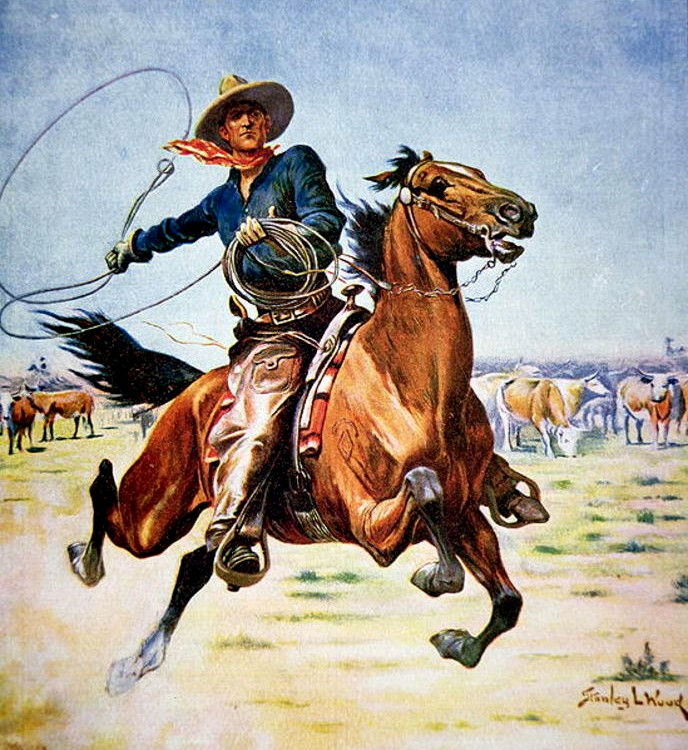
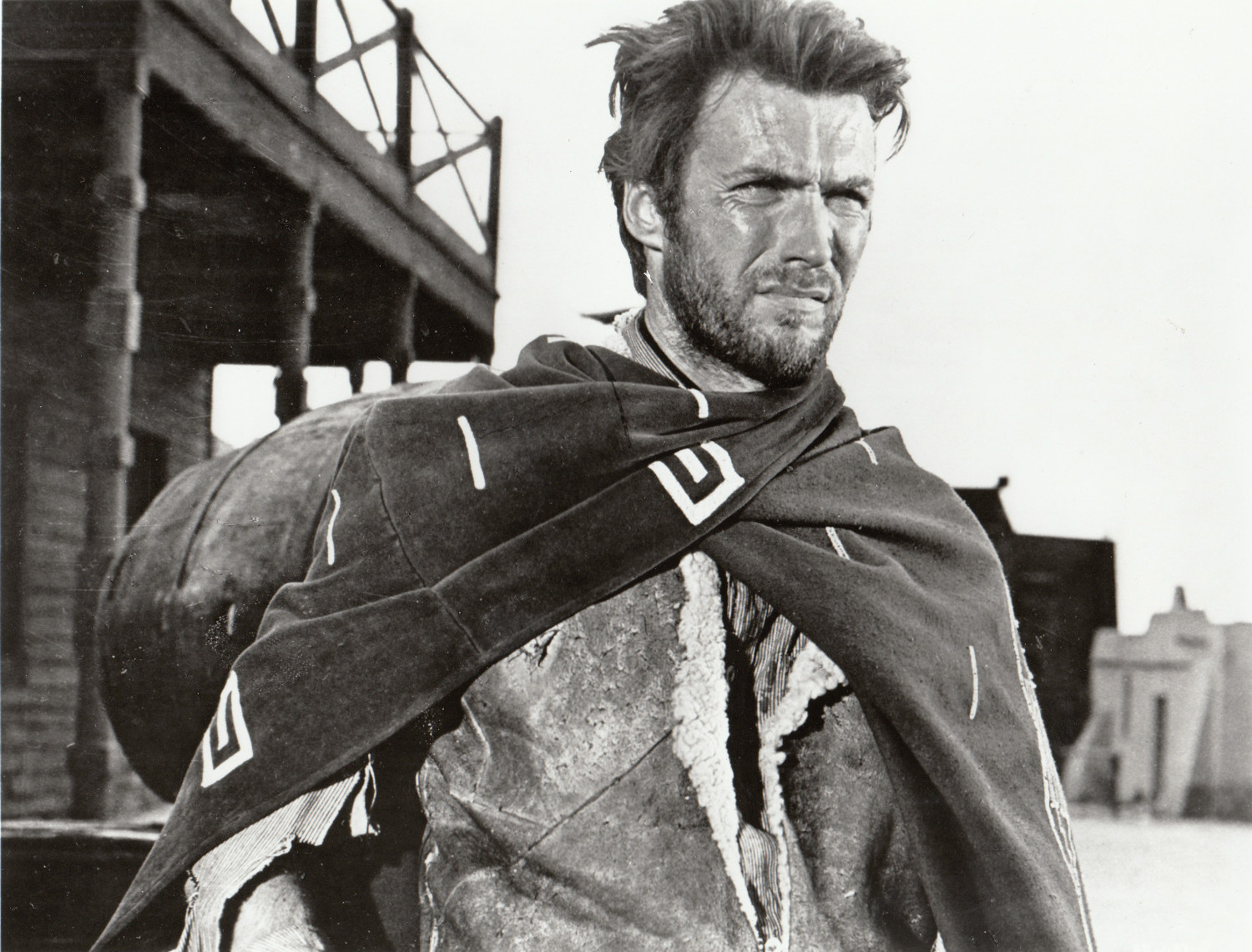
The Ghoul took inspiration from Western films, as well as Western anti-heroes such as The Man With No Name

When designing the Ghoul's outfit, costume designer Amy Westcott incorporated elements of the outfit he wears when the bombs drop in the first episode. She said, "Under his duster and vest, and layers he has acquired in the wasteland over the years, is his cowboy costume, so to speak. You can't really tell... but it's very, very distressed and aged." Westcott stated that the only reason the Ghoul did not appear more grotesque was because "he still had his wits about him." The costume design team created many different "degrees of ghoulness" so as to depict the Ghoul as only being in a stage of being a Ghoul and not depicted as one with his mind lost. Westcott also wished to showcase the show's theme of optimism by having the Ghoul show signs of decay while still maintaining his politeness. This was done to help maintain the Ghoul's humanity and help him relate to audiences. Nolan wished for the Ghoul's eyes to be visible in his design to help communicate the Ghoul's human side, and additionally wanted for the Ghoul to be "sexy."

For his performance, Goggins took influence from classic Western anti-heroes, particularly Clint Eastwood's Man with No Name. He also compared the character to Virgil in Dante's Inferno in the sense that he guides the audience through the post-apocalyptic landscape. In an interview with The Hollywood Reporter, he said, "The Ghoul on paper seemed sadistic and seemed like, 'Why is he torturing this person [Lucy]?' He never tortured her, ever. He's not Machiavellian or sadistic in that way. She is just another encounter on an average day in his life. He just so happens to have a conversation with her because there's nothing else to do while he's using her as bait. There is no glee, he's just not getting anything from being mean to her. He doesn't think he's being mean to her." In an interview with IGN, showrunner Graham Wagner spoke of the advantages of having a character who's lived through two separate eras of history. He said, "Yeah, I think it's what we were interested in is how can you make one man two completely different characters? And the answer is time. You don't have time and you're going to come out different. So yeah, he is a cynic and he is nihilistic, but it is earned. We like to think." Goggins stated that, when portraying the character, he had to figure out "who Cooper Howard was" before he could determine how he wanted to play the Ghoul's character. Goggins watched many Westerns before filming in order to help get a feel for the character. He considered the performance a "once in a lifetime experience."

Prosthetics for the character took five hours to put on the first time it was done; the process was gradually shortened to just two hours. Goggins would watch Western films while prosthetics were applied. Filming took place in hot temperatures, which resulted in discomfort for Goggins as he could not sweat properly while wearing the Ghoul's prosthetics. The Ghoul's perfect teeth, which were retainers placed onto Goggins' own teeth, also initially caused him issues with speaking, though he adapted as filming progressed.

== Appearances ==
The Ghoul is introduced in "The End" in the year 2296 as an infamous mutant bounty hunter. Throughout the first season, his cruelty and cynicism clashes with Lucy MacLean's naivety and optimism. In "The Ghouls", Lucy is sold to organ harvesters by the Ghoul yet chooses to give him life-saving drugs when he collapses from withdrawal. After parting ways with Lucy, the Ghoul adopts Dr. Wilzig's dog CX404 and renames her "Dogmeat" while hunting for a former Pre-War acquaintance. In the season finale "The Beginning", the Ghoul forms a truce with Lucy to track down her father Hank with her and Dogmeat after learning that Hank knows the whereabouts of his loved ones.

The first season also depicts the Ghoul's pre-war life as Cooper Howard, a Hollywood actor and Marine veteran with a wife and daughter in 2077. His wife Barb Howard (Frances Turner) is a high-ranking Vault-Tec executive. At his wife Barb's urging, he becomes a spokesman for Vault-Tec and eventually becomes the inspiration for their mascot Vault Boy. However, he ultimately cuts ties with the company after discovering the unethical conspiracy at the heart of the organization, which his wife is part of. With his career fading, Cooper is reduced to making personal appearances to support himself and his daughter; this results in the both of them witnessing the nuclear bombing of Los Angeles.

=== Other media ===
Among other characters from the TV series, the Ghoul was added to Fallout Shelter in a free update releasing alongside the show. The same week, an update to Fallout 76 added the Ghoul's outfit from the show as a cosmetic item.

The Ghoul makes a physical appearance in the Burning Springs update for Fallout 76, with Goggins reprising his role from the TV series. The Ghoul gives players bounties, higher-tier bounties available for bigger rewards.

The Ghoul, alongside Maximus and Lucy MacLean, appeared as playable characters in Call of Duty: Black Ops 7 as part of a Fallout collaboration event. Voice clips of Goggins from the TV series were used as voice lines for the Ghoul in Black Ops 7.

== Reception ==
Nerdist named the Ghoul among the best new characters of 2024 in either film or television. Reviewing Fallout Season 1, Paul Tassi of Forbes said that the character's casting was "spot-on" and praised his dual nature within the narrative structure. Writing for TheWrap, William Goodman praised the chemistry between Goggins and Ella Purnell, writing "It's no surprise that 'Fallout' crackles like a Geiger counter in the red during the moments Goggins and Purnell are on-screen together — something the show should lean into even more for its potential second season." Nicholas Quah of Vulture drew comparisons between the Ghoul and the Man in Black from Westworld, Nolan's previous series. In particular, Quah highlighted both characters' disillusionment with humanity and use of flashbacks in the narrative.

Following the reveal that Cooper Howard was the inspiration for Vault Boy, Polygon's Michael McWhertor praised the twist as a device showing the character's eventual decline in 2077 before his transformation into the Ghoul. Jordan Todoruk, writing for Collider, praised the Ghoul's backstory, citing that his honorable personality helped make him an appealing character to viewers, while the Ghoul's tragic past helped connect the world of the series in an interesting manner for viewers. Wesley Yin-Poole of IGN cited the character's popularity as the reason for an announced update for Fallout 76 that will allow players to create ghoul characters.

The Ghoul has been highlighted by viewers of the series for his attractiveness, with fanworks relating to the character being released in vast numbers following the release of the series. Lauren Morton, writing for PC Gamer, stated that this was a result of the Ghoul's villainous personality appealing to viewers. She also stated that this stemmed from the character of John Hancock from Fallout 4, and that Hancock's romance helped set the mold for the Ghoul's role in the series. Goggins later shared a Tweet by a fan discussing the Ghoul's attractiveness on his Instagram account.

For his performance, Goggins received his second Primetime Emmy Award nomination, having previously been nominated in 2011 for his role in Justified.
