= Xelia Mendes-Jones =

British actor

Xelia Mendes-Jones is a British actor. He (Note: Mendes-Jones uses the pronouns he/him and they/them. This article uses he/him for consistency.) is best known for his main role as Dane in the Prime Video series Fallout (2024).

== Early life and education ==
Xelia Mendes-Jones is half Indian and grew up in London, England. He attended Coleridge Primary School and North London Collegiate School. He was a javelin thrower with London Heathside and played youth football as a midfielder with Tottenham Hotspur F.C. Women in the 2009–2010 season. He was offered a spot on Tottenham's first team but declined the offer to pursue college. He is a fan of Arsenal.

Mendes-Jones went on to study Anglo-Saxon, Norse, and Celtic (ASNaC) at St Catharine's College, Cambridge, from 2016. He trained at Identity School of Acting. While studying, he pursued modelling.

== Career ==
Mendes-Jones was praised for his performance as Renna in the 2021 Prime Video fantasy series The Wheel of Time. He appeared as a featured actor alongside Maisie Williams in the music video for "She's on My Mind" by Romy, released in December 2023.

He became more widely known for his main role as 2024 Prime Video series Fallout as Dane, a young member of the Brotherhood of Steel. Mendes-Jones returned to reprise his role for the second season in 2025. Mendes-Jones also starred in a lead role in the 2024 Netflix film Havoc, his film debut. Mendes-Jones described Havoc as a career highlight, as it was his first audition for a non-binary masculine role after coming out as transgender.

== Personal life ==
PinkNews reported in 2024 that Mendes-Jones had been "very vocal about his preference" of he/they pronouns, and referred to himself as a "trans guy" in his Instagram bio earlier in that year.

== Filmography ==
=== TV ===
- 2023: The Wheel of Time
- 2024: Fallout

=== Movies ===
- 2025: Havoc
