= Frances Turner =

American actress

- Born: November 18; New Rochelle, New York
- Education: Georgetown Law; Cornell University
- Occupation: Actress
- Years active: 2006–present

Frances Turner is an American actress. She is known for roles in television shows including The Boys (2022–2026) and Fallout (2024–present).

== Early life and education ==
Turner was born in New Rochelle, New York, and graduated from Georgetown Law School and Cornell University.

== Career ==
Before working in acting, she worked as a corporate lawyer.

Turner played Bell Mallory in The Man in the High Castle. She later played Lyn Malio in New Amsterdam. In 2024, Turner joined the cast of Fallout, a show based on the video game franchise of the same name, playing the role of Barbara Howard, the wife of main character Cooper Howard.

== Filmography ==
=== Film ===
Year	Title	Role	Notes
2006	The Situation	Sharon	
2007	The Life After	Maureen	
2007	Exodus 20:13	Cicely David	
2021	After We Fell	Karen	
2022	After Ever Happy	Karen	
2023	After Everything	Karen	

=== Television ===
Year	Title	Role	Notes
2007	Law & Order	Nurse Byrd	Episode: "Remains of the Day"
2007	Guiding Light	Juvie councilor	Episode #1.15185
2009	Two Dollar Beer	Carol	TV film
2011	It's Always Sunny in Philadelphia	Christie	Guest role (season 7)
2012	Gossip Girl	Erica Winograd	Season 6, episode 3: "Dirty Rotten Scandals"
2014	Christmas Wedding Baby	Charlotte	TV film
2014	Sequestered	ADA	Season 1, episode 8: "Stop Crying"
2015	The Exes	Zoey Banks	Guest role (season 4)
2016	Shady Neighbours	Principal Lynn	TV film
2017	Lethal Weapon	Brenda	Season 1, episode 12: "Brotherly Love"
2017	Time After Time	Courtney Anders	One episode
2018	Benji the Dove	Christine	TV film
2018	Blue Bloods	Janay Brown	Season 8, episode 18: "Friendship, Love, and Loyalty"
2018	The Finest	Lena Kendrick	TV film
2018	Quantico	Chelsea Lee	Season 3, episode 3: "Hell's Gate"
2017–2019	The Gifted	Paula Turner	Recurring role
2019	The Man in the High Castle	Bell Mallory	Recurring role (season 4)
2021–2022	New Amsterdam	Lyn Malio	Recurring role (seasons 3–5)
2022–2023	Law & Order: Special Victims Unit	Elaine Samuels	Guest role (season 24)
2022–2026	The Boys	Monique	Guest role (seasons 3–5)
2024–present	Fallout	Barb Howard	Guest role (season 1); Main role (seasons 2–3)

== Further information ==
- Fallout interview
