= Jack Shaindlin =

- Born: April 14, 1909; Karasubazar, Crimea, Russian Empire
- Origin: Chicago, Illinois, U.S.
- Died: September 22, 1978 (aged 69) New York City, New York, U.S.
- Instrument: Piano
- Years active: 54
- Labels: Cinemusic, Inc,

Jack Shaindlin (April 14, 1909 – September 22, 1978) was a Russian-American musician, composer, arranger, conductor, and music director. He was musical director for The March of Time newsreel series.

== Early life and career ==
Shaindlin was born in Karasubazar, Crimea, Russian Empire on April 14, 1909 to a Jewish family. His parents were Rachel (née Golden) and Chaim Shaindlin. His father owned and operated a coal business and was possibly shot and killed during a robbery of his business. Shaindlin came to North America, via Constantinople, on December 8, 1922 and entered the U.S. under the name Jacob Scheindlin. Shaindlin began his musical career as a pianist in silent movie halls, having relocated to the United States as a young boy (Chicago) along with his mother and brother Leo by winning a music scholarship/piano competition in Russia. He became a naturalized US citizen July 28, 1934.

In the late 1940s he was musical director of the Carnegie Pops Orchestra at Carnegie Hall. He was cited by Harry S. Truman for his war contributions for his work on the documentary Tanks.

He was the founder and President of Triumph Publications, Inc. of New York City, an extensive and progressive commercial sound music recording library with affiliation to BMI. He scored numerous television and cartoon music, including such classic favorites as Quick Draw McGraw, Father Knows Best and The Cisco Kid. He also composed the 1951 fanfare for Screen Gems used from 1951

He was Musical Director of the Arthur Penn feature film Mickey One, starring Warren Beatty and with musical features by saxophonist Stan Getz. Shaindlin also directed a number of significant documentaries, ranging in scope from travel themes to education, health and Hollywood. Their offices were located in New York City on West 60th Street between Columbus Circle and Eighth Avenue. He collaborated with famed entertainer Gypsy Rose Lee late in her career to produce a musical review in which she intended to star in New York at the El Morocco nightclub, which in the end did not materialize, reportedly due to her health issues.

Upon formal retirement in the early 1970s he became a musical consultant to Madison Square Garden.

== Conductor ==
Shaindlin is in some respects better known today as the conductor of two scores composed by Morton Gould for Cinerama Holiday (1955), the second Cinerama production, Windjammer (1958), the first (and only) film produced in the rival Cinemiracle format. and In Search of the Castaways (1962). The original soundtrack albums from these films were released on Mercury Records and Columbia Records, respectively.

== In popular culture ==
The songs "I'm Tickled Pink" and "Let's Go Sunning" are featured in-game "Galaxy News Radio" station in the 2008 video game Fallout 3. "Let's Go Sunning" was used in the February 11, 2012 episode of Saturday Night Live during the "Bein' Quirky with Zooey Deschanel" comedy sketch. Due to an error, the song was misattributed to the late Cass Elliot in the sketch. The song was additionally featured in a trailer for the 2005 video game Destroy All Humans!

Also, the opening and closing theme of the TV series Adventures of Superman is accredited to Leon Klatzkin. For some reason, despite the Los Angeles Times listing his many compositions for television shows, some people think Klatzkin was not a composer, but a Mutel employee, a film cutter who helped film editors select appropriate tracks for their pictures and that Shaindlin may have composed the music. The song "Let's Go Sunning" is used anachronistically in the episode "The Good Listener" of Boardwalk Empire's fifth season, set in 1931. It is audible when Nelson Van Alden's son is asking him a question for his science class.

"Let's Go Sunning" is also used in the 2019 TV Show Doom Patrol, where it is heard coming from the room of Rita Farr after she opens the door.

The song "Arizona Fanfare" is used in SpongeBob SquarePants associated with Mermaid Man and Barnacle Boy. Additionally, the song "Verve" plays on Plankton's record player in the episode of the same name.

"Washington in the news" is used in Michael Bay's World War Two drama "Pearl Harbor". The song plays in the background as a newsreel is shown in a movie theater. Three other songs by Jack Shaindlin can be heard on the director's cut of "Pearl Harbor" when you look through the bonus features of the other three discs of the four disc set. "At The Pool", "All Disc & Heaven Too" and "Let's Go Sunning" are used.
