= Teodoro Maniaci =

American film director

- Born: New York
- Education: Tufts University, Graduate Film School of New York University
- Occupations: Cinematographer, director
- Employer: Self-employed
- Known for: Documentary One Nation Under God, cinematography for Tao of Steve and TV specials
- Website: teo.nyc

Teodoro Maniaci is an American cinematographer and documentary director. He is best known for the directing One Nation Under God, a documentary on the ex-gay movement.

== Personal life and education ==
Maniaci was born and raised in Long Island, New York. He attended Tufts University outside of Boston, Massachusetts and received a master's degree from New York University Film School in 1990. As of 2007, he was a member of the Directors of Photography Union, Local 600.

== Cinematography ==
Maniaci's cinematography credits include Clean, Shaven (1993), Claire Dolan (1998) The Tao of Steve (2000), The Business of Strangers (2001), Party Monster (2003), Inside Deep Throat (2005), and Outsourced (2006).

Charles Taylor from Salon said the cinematography of Party Monster "looks as atrocious as most digital video", though Maniaci was praised for the cinematography in Claire Dolan by its director Lodge Kerrigan, and by Ken Hollings from the British Film Institute.

Maniaci has also done cinematography for many TV series, including Brotherhood, Allegiance, The Breaks and The Bold Type, and for several music videos and short films.

When interviewed in 2000, Maniaci commented on the disparaging styles in his films, saying "you’d be hard-pressed to say there’s a single person behind them. They're all really different looking ... Claire Dolan, for instance, is an incredibly formal art film with very precise, almost geometric sort of chrome-and-glass photography. It’s very voyeuristic. Whereas in The Opportunists the camera is invisible. The shots are carefully chosen, but the film is not about the camerawork. It doesn't call attention to itself." Maniaci describes his work as "highly adaptive. I try to create a look that’s appropriate for each film. It’s not about me attaching myself [to a project] and it becoming about me. It’s about me becoming part of it – trying to figure out what that project wants to be."

Maniaci received the Hamptons International Film Festival Cinematography Award for Searching for Paradise (2002).

Maniaci will be one of the cinematographers for the 2024 TV series Fallout.

== One Nation Under God ==
Of all the films he has worked on, the one most identified with Maniaci is One Nation Under God, about the ex-gay movement, in particular the Exodus movement. He was both co-producer and co-director for this 1993 documentary.

=== Synopsis ===
This film is about how lesbians and gay men try to become "ex-gay". The film focuses on one ex-ex-gay male couple, but also shows how through such techniques as the women wearing make-up and the men doing butch or macho mannerisms. It also includes black and white archival footage. It also goes in some historical background, for context.

Yahoo describes it as "A documentary about the contemporary struggle for gay and lesbian civil rights, focusing on the religious, right-wing proliferation of curative therapies for homosexuality." "Judge" Patrick Bromley at DVD Verdict gives a fuller synopsis.

=== Critical response ===
In 1993, Maniaci shared the Audience Award at the San Francisco Lesbian & Gay Film Festival for One Nation Under God.

Variety positively reviewed the film, and Yahoo films gives it an A-minus rating. PlanetOut Inc. gave it four stars, and described as a "riveting documentary (that) offers the most dynamic historical overview of gays and lesbians in modern American society since Before Stonewall." DVD Verdict and DVD Talk also gave positive reviews.

The documentary was shown on the PBS television show, P.O.V. in 1994. The New York Times reviewed that showing on Channel 13 for the New York City market, giving a mixed blessing. The reviewer liked many parts, but demurred, "Unfortunately, One Nation Under God has a patchy, jumpy, overdone quality. The producers can't bear to leave bad enough alone: suddenly you find yourself watching homosexuals being rounded up by German Nazis. Nor can the producers resist some mushy proselytizing." In concluding, he wrote, "A significant argument is advanced here that opinions about homosexuality have less to do with science than with religion, morals and politics. If the producers had been able to contain themselves, develop that argument in a more coherent way and make their case without decoration, One Nation Under God might have been a considerably more consequential work."

In her dissertation, Nancy Dawn Wadsworth called One Nation Under God the "best treatment I have seen on Christian ex-gay movements".

=== Cultural impact ===
One Nation Under God has become part of some academia studies in film studies.

In an article entitled Bullets, Ballots and Bibles: Documenting the History of the Gay and Lesbian Struggle in America, scholar Bruce R. Brasell states the film "explores the recycling by religious fundamentalists of discredited psychiatric treatments from the Sixties, reparative theory, to 'cure' homosexuals today."
