= Stuart Dryburgh =

British-New Zealand cinematographer (born 1952)

- Born: 30 March 1952 (age 74); London, England
- Citizenship: English, New Zealand
- Years active: 1980–present
- Website: www.stuartdryburgh.com

Stuart Dryburgh (born 30 March 1952 in London) is an English-born New Zealand cinematographer.

== Biography ==
Born in London, his family emigrated to New Zealand at the age of 9.

He completed a degree in architecture at the University of Auckland, but subsequently moved into the film industry.

He was nominated for the Academy Award for Best Cinematography for his work on the 1993 romance film, The Piano, but lost to Janusz Kamiński for Schindler's List. He was also nominated for an Emmy for his work on the Boardwalk Empire pilot.

He lives in Brooklyn, New York.

== Filmography ==
=== Feature film ===
Year	Title	Director	Notes
1987	The Leading Edge	Michael Firth	
1990	An Angel at My Table	Jane Campion	
1993	The Piano	Jane Campion	
1994	Once Were Warriors	Lee Tamahori	
1995	The Perez Family	Mira Nair	
1996	Lone Star	John Sayles	
1996	The Portrait of a Lady	Jane Campion	
1999	Analyze This	Harold Ramis	
1999	Runaway Bride	Garry Marshall	
2001	Bridget Jones's Diary	Sharon Maguire	
2001	Kate & Leopold	James Mangold	
2001	The Extreme Team	Leslie Libman	
2003	The Recruit	Roger Donaldson	
2004	The Beautiful Country	Hans Petter Moland	
2004	In My Father's Den	Brad McGann	
2005	Æon Flux	Karyn Kusama	
2006	The Painted Veil	John Curran	
2007	No Reservations	Scott Hicks	
2007	The Girl in the Park	David Auburn	
2008	Nim's Island	Jennifer Flackett; Mark Levin	
2009	Amelia	Mira Nair	
2010	The Tempest	Julie Taymor	
2011	Texas Killing Fields	Ami Canaan Mann	
2011	I Don't Know How She Does It	Douglas McGrath	
2012	Emperor	Peter Webber	
2013	The Secret Life of Walter Mitty	Ben Stiller	
2015	Blackhat	Michael Mann	
2016	Alice Through the Looking Glass	James Bobin	
2016	The Great Wall	Zhang Yimou	With Zhao Xiaoding
2017	Gifted	Marc Webb	
2017	The Only Living Boy in New York	Marc Webb	
2017	The Upside	Neil Burger	
2018	Ben Is Back	Peter Hedges	
2019	Men in Black: International	F. Gary Gray	
2025	Kinda Pregnant	Tyler Spindel	

=== Television ===
Year	Title	Director	Notes
1989	The Ray Bradbury Theater	Roger Tompkins; Costa Botes	3 episodes
1998	Sex and the City	Susan Seidelman	Episode "Sex and the City"
2008	New Amsterdam	Lasse Hallström	Episode "Pilot"
2010	Boardwalk Empire	Martin Scorsese	Episode "Broadwalk Empire"
2011	Expedition Week	Tony Gerber	Episode "Forbidden Tomb of Genghis Khan"
2011-2012	Luck	Michael Mann; Terry George	Episodes "Pilot" and "Ace Meets with a Potential Investor"
2015	American Odyssey	Peter Horton	Episode "Gone Elvis"
2018	New Amsterdam	Kate Dennis	Episode "Pilot"
2024	Fallout	Jonathan Nolan	4 episodes

TV movies

Year	Title	Director
1986	Jewel's Darl	Peter Wells
1998	Poodle Springs	Bob Rafelson

== Awards and nominations ==
Year	Institution	Category	Title	Result	Ref.
1990	New Zealand Film and TV Awards	Best Cinematography	An Angel at My Table	Won	
1993	Australian Film Institute Awards	Best Cinematography	The Piano	Won	
1993	British Society of Cinematographers	Best Cinematography	The Piano	Nominated	
1993	Camerimage Festival	Golden Frog	The Piano	Won	
1993	Los Angeles Film Critics Association	Best Cinematography	The Piano	Nominated	
1993	New York Film Critics Circle	Best Cinematography	The Piano	Nominated	
1994	Academy Awards	Best Cinematography	The Piano	Nominated	
1994	American Society of Cinematographers	Outstanding Achievement in Cinematography	The Piano	Nominated	
1994	BAFTA Awards	Best Cinematography	The Piano	Nominated	
1994	National Society of Film Critics	Best Cinematography	The Piano	Nominated	
1994	St. Louis Gateway Film Critics Association	Best Cinematography	The Painted Veil	Won	
2005	Shanghai International Film Festival	Best Cinematography	In My Father's Den	Won	
2005	New Zealand Film and TV Awards	Best Cinematography	In My Father's Den	Won	
2006	Boston Society of Film Critics	Best Cinematography	The Painted Veil	Nominated	
2006	Primetime Emmy Awards	Outstanding Cinematography	Boardwalk Empire (pilot episode)	Nominated	
2006	Satellite Awards	Best Cinematography	The Secret Life of Walter Mitty	Nominated	
2017	New Zealand Cinematographers Society	Gold Award (Features)	The Great Wall	Won	
2017	New Zealand Cinematographers Society	Cinematographer of the Year	—N/a	Won	
