= Dogmeat (Fallout) =

Non-player character dog in the Fallout series

- Fallout character
- Dogmeat in Fallout 4
- First game: Fallout (1997)
- Created by: Tim Cain
- Designed by: Jesse Heinig
- Motion capture: River (Fallout 4)

In-universe information
- Species: Dog

Dogmeat is the name given to various dogs featured in the role-playing game series Fallout. Dogmeat was introduced as an optional companion to the player character in the original Fallout (1997), and made a cameo appearance in Fallout 2 (1998). Other dogs named Dogmeat are featured and serve similar roles in Fallout 3 (2008), Fallout 4 (2015), and in the television series Fallout (2024).

The character has been well received, widely regarded as a series highlight, as well as one of the most popular sidekick characters in video games. River the dog's performance was positively received, and has won best video game dog for 2015.

== Character design ==
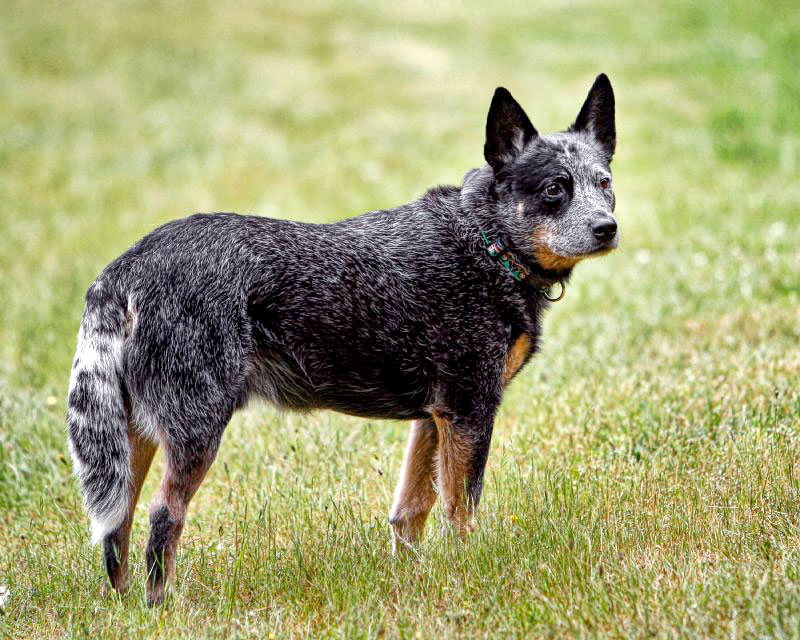
For Fallout 3, Dogmeat was modeled to be of a Blue Heeler breed (pictured) in order to resemble the dog of Mad Max from the film Mad Max 2.

Dogmeat was inspired by the unnamed dog of Max Rockatansky (Mad Max) from the 1981 post-apocalyptic film Mad Max 2. His initial name had been "Dogshit" and his ultimate name was derived from the opening scene of the 1975 post-apocalyptic film A Boy and His Dog, in which the main character Vic calls his dog Blood "Dogmeat". According to Fallout producer, lead programmer and designer Tim Cain, "Leonard Boyarsky, the [game's] art director ... had that movie running continuously in his office, and I think he remarked on several occasions that having a dog in the game would be really cool. [It's] why we wanted a dog in the first place." Fallout programmer and designer Jesse Heinig was credited by Cain as probably "one person to thank for Dogmeat." Heinig himself said: "My understanding is that [Fallout designer] Scott Bennie settled on the name 'Dogmeat' for the character, and it's likely that he did pick that from the story in question."

In 2009, Fallout designer Chris Taylor said they "never expected that Dogmeat would become such a popular character." Taylor said: "I always intended that the various NPCs that joined up with the player would come to a violent end. I was shocked when I heard of all the work people went through to keep Dogmeat alive to the end – especially the hell that they went through with the force fields in the Military Base." According to Fallout 2 and Fallout: New Vegas designer Chris Avellone, Dogmeat is "arguably the most successful NPC companion ever" for several reasons: "One, he doesn't talk, so the players can project a personality on to him. Two, he's effective in combat ... and three, he's a dog that stays with you through thick-and-thin. I don't think there's a deeper 'awww' sentiment than people have in their hearts for their pets."

In Fallout 4, Dogmeat's motion capture was done by a German Shepherd named River. On June 27, 2021, Fallout 4's senior game designer Joel Burgess confirmed via Twitter that River had died. On July 7, 2021, Bethesda Softworks and Xbox donated $10,000 to the Humane society in honor of Dogmeat.

== Appearances ==
In the original Fallout by Black Isle Studios and Interplay Entertainment, the protagonist player character, the Vault Dweller, first encounters the stray Dogmeat in Junktown. Dogmeat's former owner (an unnamed man closely resembling Max Rockatansky) died at the hands of thugs hired by a local gangster named Gizmo. If the player character feeds Dogmeat or is wearing a leather jacket, Dogmeat will follow them and fight in their defense. According to the series' canon, Dogmeat was adopted by the Vault Dweller on 30 December 2161, and killed by a force field barrier during the Vault Dweller's assault on the Master's Military Base on 20 April 2162. Dogmeat was supposed to appear in the canceled film adaptation of the game as well.

In Fallout 2, Dogmeat makes a non-canonical appearance in an easter egg type special encounter "Café of Broken Dreams". During the encounter, Dogmeat can be picked up by the player character, the Chosen One, if the player approaches him wearing Vault 13 jumpsuit (or the Bridgekeeper's robes, due to a bug in the game). If the player chooses to kill Dogmeat, a man named Mel (in a reference to Mel Gibson, the actor who played Mad Max in the film) will appear and try to avenge him. Dogmeat has made uncredited cameo appearances outside of the Fallout universe in Troika Games' 2001 Arcanum: Of Steamworks and Magick Obscura (created by Fallout designer Tim Cain) and in 2004 The Bard's Tale by inXile Entertainment (headed by Fallout producer Brian Fargo). However, there were no plans to bring back Dogmeat for the original third Fallout game project by Black Isle Studios, the canceled Van Buren.

An entirely different dog named Dogmeat appears in Fallout 3 by Bethesda Softworks, which begins in the year 2277. His master, a scavenger, was killed by a band of raiders in the scrapyard where the dog is to be found. Dogmeat can be recruited by Fallout 3's player character, the Lone Wanderer. The dog can find objects of value across the landscape and bring them to the player. Fallout 3 expansion set Broken Steel optionally (enabled by choosing the 'perk' bonus "Puppies!" after reaching 22nd experience level) allows a killed Dogmeat to be replaced by a new one (with twice as many hit points, that is a starting value of 1,000 instead of 500) whenever he dies during the game.

A new version of Dogmeat appears in Fallout 4, as a German Shepherd, who cannot be killed, and can still locate items in the wasteland like in Fallout 3. This version of Dogmeat also appears in Fallout Shelter.

Dogmeat, dubbed "CX404", appears in the 2024 American post-apocalyptic drama television series Fallout. In the series, the dog is a female Belgian Malinois born from a breeding program headed by the Enclave. The program requires that underweight puppies be incinerated at birth, but Dr. Siggi Wilzig (Michael Emerson) falsifies her birth record to spare her. Wilzig cares for CX404 over the years before his research project is discovered and they both flee the Enclave. Wilzig later is mortally wounded by the Ghoul (Walton Goggins) during a shootout in Filly, and dies as Lucy MacLean (Ella Purnell) is escorting him to meet Lee Moldaver (Sarita Choudhury) at the Griffith Observatory. The Ghoul adopts CX404, using her to track Wilzig's scent, which leads him to Wilzig's decapitated body, and then to a lake where Lucy has just lost Wilzig's head to a Gulper. After his chems are destroyed by Lucy during a fight with the Gulper, the Ghoul abandons CX404 as he leaves with a captive Lucy to search for replacement vials. Sometime later, the Ghoul encounters CX404 locked in a Nuka-Cola dispenser at a gas station after having been abandoned by Thaddeus (Johnny Pemberton). He adopts her again, and renames her "Dogmeat". She is last seen accompanying Lucy and the Ghoul as they set out in pursuit of Lucy's father Hank MacLean (Kyle MacLachlan).

== Reception ==
Everyone knows that a dog is a man's best friend. Never is this truer than in a post-apocalyptic nuclear world.

— Tom Hoggins, The Telegraph

Dogmeat's character was well-received by gaming media, who saw it as one of the franchise's most iconic NPCs. Dogmeat was also acclaimed by numerous publications as one of the best sidekicks, and best video game dogs. Ryan McCaffrey of IGN chose Dogmeat as the top feature he wished to return in Fallout 4. Giancarlo Valdes of VentureBeat named Dogmeat one of the best dogs of 2015. Reid McCarter of Kill Screen has praised it for being "obedient". He further said that "it isn't just that he's a handsome-looking German Shepherd, with wonderfully rendered, intelligent, and kind dog eyes. It isn't even that he's so quick to throw himself at any threat to the player character with a suicidal disregard for his own safety." Owen Good of Kotaku called it as its "one of the most [e]motionally fulfilling features." The book Level Up!: The Guide to Great Video Game Design by Scott Rogers used him as an example while discussing how the "party members don't need to be human". In 2008, UGO Team stated this "undisputed champion of Fallout characters" is not "only our favorite Fallout character, he's also one of gaming's greatest dogs." In 2009, Michael Fiegel of The Escapist called Dogmeat possibly the most beloved character of the Fallout universe, writing that "in an uncaring wasteland ... Dogmeat is a moral compass: Though your needle might swing towards good or evil, his center always holds strong provided you protect him." In 2021, Lauren Rouse of Kotaku included Dogmeat as her "best animal companions that are the real mvps of video games", and further stated that "he can fetch, he can attack, he can be dressed up in crazy costumes and he will love you unconditionally." Conversely, John Walker of Rock Paper Shotgun expressed his dislike of Dogmeat, calling it "stupid" and claiming that it "didn't have a strong headstart winning over my love. Dogmeat had a chance. But good grief, what a disastrous piece of crap he is".

River, the dog who portrayed Dogmeat in Fallout 4, was awarded "Top Video Game Dog of 2015" at The CW's World Dog Awards. In 2018, A Dogmeat statue has been made.

Fans have modded various Fallout titles with Dogmeat-centric additions. A Fallout 3 mod that gives Dogmeat armor was compared by Conrad Zimmerman of Destructoid to the horse armor DLC from Bethesda's The Elder Scrolls IV: Oblivion, "except free and functional". A Fallout 4 mod allows the player to play as Dogmeat, using bites to attack enemies, while the F.E.T.C.H. Collectron robot dog in Fallout 76 was modded to have Dogmeat's appearance.
