= Game Rant =

Gaming news website

- Website type: News website
- Founded: 2009
- Headquarters: Ogden, Utah, United States
- Founder: Vic Holtreman
- Editor: Anthony Taormina
- Employees: 193
- Parent: Valnet
- Website: gamerant.com
- Users: 80 million+ (monthly readers)
- Current status: Active

Game Rant is an American news website primarily covering news about video games. It was founded in 2009 by Vic Holtreman as a sister site of Screen Rant. Game Rant is owned by media company Valnet since 2019.

== History ==
Game Rant was founded in 2009 by Vic Holtreman, founder of Warp 10 LLC. The company previously created Screen Rant and decided to launch Game Rant as a sister site to Screen Rant to replicate SR's success in video game news and reviews. Game Rant was sold to Valnet in 2019 and was reunited with Screen Rant, which was sold to Valnet in 2015. Valnet installed Ben Kendrick as the publisher of Game Rant. Game Rant has reportedly become the company's flagship gaming news outlet and its first major acquisition. Game Rant is based in Ogden, Utah and has 193 employees. Valnet said the website is read by over 80 million users monthly.

In a 2025 interview, Vic Holtreman said he launched Game Rant because some Screen Rant editors were "avid gamers" and asked him to create a Screen Rant spin-off dedicated to gaming. He said that there were some difficulties running the site after upon the launch as all editors of the site were volunteers. Since they were not paid, they had no motivation to write new articles. Holtreman said Game Rant was full of short and low-quality articles, which caused the site to lose traffic. In response, he fired the site's co-owner for mismanagement and became the sole owner of Game Rant. Afterwards, the site began to grow and he chose Anthony Taormina as editor-in-chief of the site.

Later, the site's traffic began to decline again, and Holtreman decided to sell it to Valnet, concerned for its future. Vic Holtreman left Game Rant after the acquisition as Valnet did not want him to remain part of the company. In April 2025, Game Rant launched a video game database on its website, initially consisting of 10,000 games. Users can rate games and write reviews, as well as view crucial information of the games such as release date and developer.

== Reception ==
GadgetReview rated the site's credibility at 25 out of 100, noting that it could "benefit from greater transparency and methodological consistency". Website MakeUseOf described Game Rant as a "trusted source of gaming information for over ten years". Founder Vic Holtreman said Game Rant was in "good hands" and would "become more popular than ever" after selling it to Valnet. Gaming blog Smash JT has claimed that one of the site's editors is not a real person, but an AI-generated identity that publishes AI-generated content.
