= Geneva Robertson-Dworet =

American screenwriter (born 1985)

- Born: May 8, 1985 (age 41); Baltimore, Maryland, U.S.
- Education: Harvard College
- Occupation: Screenwriter
- Spouse: Hayes Davenport
- Writing career
- Years active: 2010–present

Geneva Robertson-Dworet (born May 8, 1985) is an American screenwriter. She rose to prominence after being hired in 2015 to rewrite the script for the 2018 Tomb Raider reboot, starring Alicia Vikander and directed by Roar Uthaug. She co-wrote the screenplay for Marvel Studios' Captain Marvel (2019) and is the co-showrunner and co-creator of the television adaptation of the Fallout video game franchise for Amazon Prime Video.

Robertson-Dworet was originally set to write the screenplay for David Ayer's Gotham City Sirens film, as part of the DC Extended Universe. Additionally, she wrote a third Sherlock Holmes film, an adaptation of the role playing game Dungeons & Dragons, and a screenplay adapting the novel Artemis.

She was originally slated to co-write Sony Pictures' Silver & Black, a team-up film about the Spider-Man characters Black Cat and Silver Sable, with Lindsey Beer. However the film was removed from Sony's production schedule and the project's future is unclear.

In 2018, Robertson-Dworet has founded a production company, called Known Universe, together with Lindsey Beer and Nicole Perlman. Known Universe has so far announced that it is going to help produce the new adaptation of William Golding's Lord of the Flies. It will also executive produce a Hello Kitty animation/live-action hybrid movie.

Robertson-Dworet is a 2007 graduate of Harvard College. She wrote for The Harvard Lampoon during her time there.

== Filmography ==
=== Film ===
Year	Title	Director(s)	Notes
2018	Tomb Raider	Roar Uthaug	Co-wrote story with Evan Daugherty; Co-wrote screenplay with Alastair Siddons
2019	Captain Marvel	Anna Boden and Ryan Fleck	Co-wrote screenplay with Anna Boden and Ryan Fleck; Co-wrote story with Nicole Perlman, Meg LeFauve, Anna Boden and Ryan Fleck

=== Television ===
Year	Title	Notes
2024–present	Fallout	Creator, writer, showrunner and executive producer Nominated - Primetime Emmy Award for Outstanding Drama Series; Nominated - Primetime Emmy Award for Outstanding Writing for a Drama Series
