= Christopher Taylor (game designer) =

American computer, board and card game developer

Christopher "Chris" Taylor is a video game, board game and card game, developer originally from Southern California. Taylor is most famous for acting as lead designer for the original Fallout title for Interplay Entertainment, working alongside Tim Cain, Leonard Boyarsky and Jason Anderson. While at Interplay, Taylor contributed to the design of Star Trek: Starfleet Command, Stonekeep and Fallout 2. He also served as producer for The Lord of the Rings Online.

In 2005, Taylor and two other Fallout designers (Tom Decker and Scott Everts) founded Zero Radius Games, a board game and non-collectible card game development company. On September 22, 2008, it was announced on Interplay's website that Taylor had rejoined the company and would be working on "Project V13", later revealed to be Fallout Online. However Bethesda, through a drawn out legal battle, cancelled this project.

He was the designer of Pillars of Eternity: Lords of the Eastern Reach, a tabletop game based on the video game Pillars of Eternity which was released in 2016. He is also the designer of Nemo's War, a game published by Victory Point Games.
