= Jason D. Anderson =

American video game developer

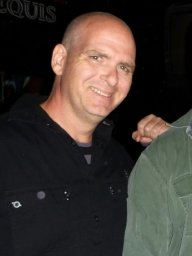
- Anderson in 2015
- Occupations: Video game designer, video game artist
- Employer: inXile Entertainment
- Notable work: Fallout, Arcanum: Of Steamworks and Magick Obscura, Vampire: The Masquerade – Bloodlines, Evolve

Jason D. Anderson, usually credited as Jason Anderson, is a video game developer. He started out as a contract artist for Interplay on the USCF Chess project. He was later hired to work on Fallout for which he became Lead Technical Artist, working on the original game design, interface, and quests. After working on the prototype design for Fallout 2, Anderson left with fellow developers Timothy Cain and Leonard Boyarsky to found Troika Games. After Troika Games collapsed, Anderson left the game industry for a short time to sell real estate.

Interplay reopened in-house development and in 2007 hired Anderson as Creative Director for an unannounced massively multiplayer online game. In March 2009, Anderson joined inXile Entertainment as Creative Director. In January 2011, he left inXile to join Turtle Rock Studios. In March 2012, inXile announced the crowdfunded development of Wasteland 2 with Anderson as the game's storyline author.

In March 2019 it was announced on Twitter that Anderson had rejoined inXile, who in the meantime had been acquired by Microsoft alongside Obsidian Entertainment. This indirectly reunites him with Troika colleagues Tim Cain and Leonard Boyarsky, who work for Obsidian.

== Biography ==
Jason Anderson grew up being the youngest of 10 children. He got into Dungeons & Dragons (D&D) around the age of 10 when his mom bought him the basic D&D set. Already at a young age, he enjoyed using the D&D and Avalon Hill settings to imagine his own adventures set in other universes such as Blade Runner. He learned basic programming on the Apple II and created his own dungeon crawling program to simulate dungeons and random encounters from the D&D table top game. After high school he nearly stopped using the computer altogether, focusing on working in construction and getting his degree as Recording engineering from Golden West College in 1992. He later purchased an Amiga and subsequently taught himself to use both LightWave 3D and 3D Studio (for Windows). He sent a sample of his work to Interplay Entertainment, which got him started in the computer games industry.

He has mentioned X-COM, Jagged Alliance and Planescape: Torment as being some of his favorite games.

== Career ==
=== Interplay Entertainment (March 1994 – July 1997) ===
Anderson got his first contract working on USCF Chess and was subsequently offered a full-time position at Interplay Entertainment. His first job was 'clean-up artist' on Stonekeep, which was just about to ship. In 1993 he was assigned to the GURPS-related project being developed by Tim Cain; the yet to be named Fallout. Within a short time, he rose to a lead position and became a key member of the Fallout team. His role in making the game started out with supplying Cain with art to test out with the graphics engine he was building. Even though Anderson was hired as an artist, he was allowed to take on several roles in the development process. He attended all design meetings and ultimately designed the way art would be implemented into the Fallout engine.

The small team size also contributed to the diversity of the tasks. Anderson created a large part of the opening cinematic, modeled and animated around half of the creatures, including female humans and mutants. He also built the interface, created many of the landscape tiles and wall sets. Finally, he did significant design work as well, especially concerning the story and the quests. Anderson's wife also contributed to the development of the game, creating the death screen and doing several animations (including the two-headed Brahmin and Mr. Handy) and in-game movies shown when the water levels are lowering, the 'dipped in the vats/turn you into a mutant movie' and the 'exploding mutant vats movie'. One of Anderson's fondest memory from Fallout's development was coming up with the ending to the game in conjunction with Leonard Boyarsky. They figured it would fit the tone of the game, including the xenophobic nature of the vault dwellers, if the main character would actually be rejected by his former people. Cain was skeptical at first, given its unorthodox nature compared to other RPGs which were usually about empowering the player and becoming a hero. But he eventually gave in to the idea.

Fallout shipped in October 1997 and became a commercial success, eventually selling around 600,000 copies. Therefore, Interplay began the initial design work for the sequel. However, the initial team, notably Cain, Anderson and Boyarsky, felt that many design decisions were being taken without their consent such as who should work on the project. Anderson recalls disagreement with Interplay concerning who the next team members should be. As Fallout had received little attention internally from Interplay during its development gave the designers extensive freedom to craft the game the way they wanted to. However, that began to change already in the final months before it shipped. Cain says that he was unhappy at how development worked at Interplay while developing Fallout. People who neither played nor liked games were making crucial decisions about marketing the game, its features, and the shipping date. Consequently, Cain became increasingly discontent with the new working environment at Interplay. Already in July 1997, three months before Fallout would ship, he had decided that he did not want to work on the sequel. Before Thanksgiving that year, he told Feargus Urquhart of his plans of quitting the company, as he was afraid that increased interference from different units of Interplay would hamper his creative freedom of working on the game. Cain ended up working on Fallout 2 for a few more months, and was given the role of lead designer and producer. Boyarsky and Anderson wrote the main story line for the game. However, the problems persisted. According to Cain, marketing and sales took counterproductive decisions pertaining inter alia to game box design without consulting him. His wish to become division manager for the marketing department was met with resistance from Urquhart, who saw this as an infringement on his own authority and responsibilities. Cain recalls spending too much time arguing with people and trying to defend the game from devolving into a lesser product. Boyarsky and Anderson were both unwilling to work on a sequel for Fallout without him.

Screenshot from Boneyard: JDA did many landscape tiles and wall sets in Fallout

In mid-January 1998, Cain decided to leave Interplay. Anderson and Boyarsky submitted their resignation the day after. Having left Interplay, Cain, Anderson and Boyarsky met the day after to discuss their next moves. None of them had approached any other gaming company to inquire for a job. Originally, they never planned to make their own company as none of them were businessmen but knew that they enjoyed working together. In the following weeks they contacted local companies such as Blizzard Entertainment and Virgin Interactive, who were more interested in hiring them to work on ongoing projects, rather than let them work on their own idea. Subsequently, they figured that their game would only be made if they formed their own company, so they "switched tactics and began approaching companies for a contract and not for employment". This is when Troika Games was founded.

=== Troika Games (April 1998 – April 2005) ===
Troika Games was incorporated on 1 April 1998 by Tim Cain, Jason Anderson and Leonard Boyarsky, with all three having the title of "Joint CEO". According to Anderson, each had their unique specialty: Cain being a talented programmer, Leonard a talented artist while Anderson created solutions for merging art and programming . The name ‘Troika’ was originally coined by Feargus Urquhart, referring to their ability to work together and complement each other's skills. Anderson described the workplace at Troika as having a casual environment and working hours, with frequent social activities such as barbecues and trips to the movie theater. Also, Troika offered competitive remuneration packages including retirement plans.

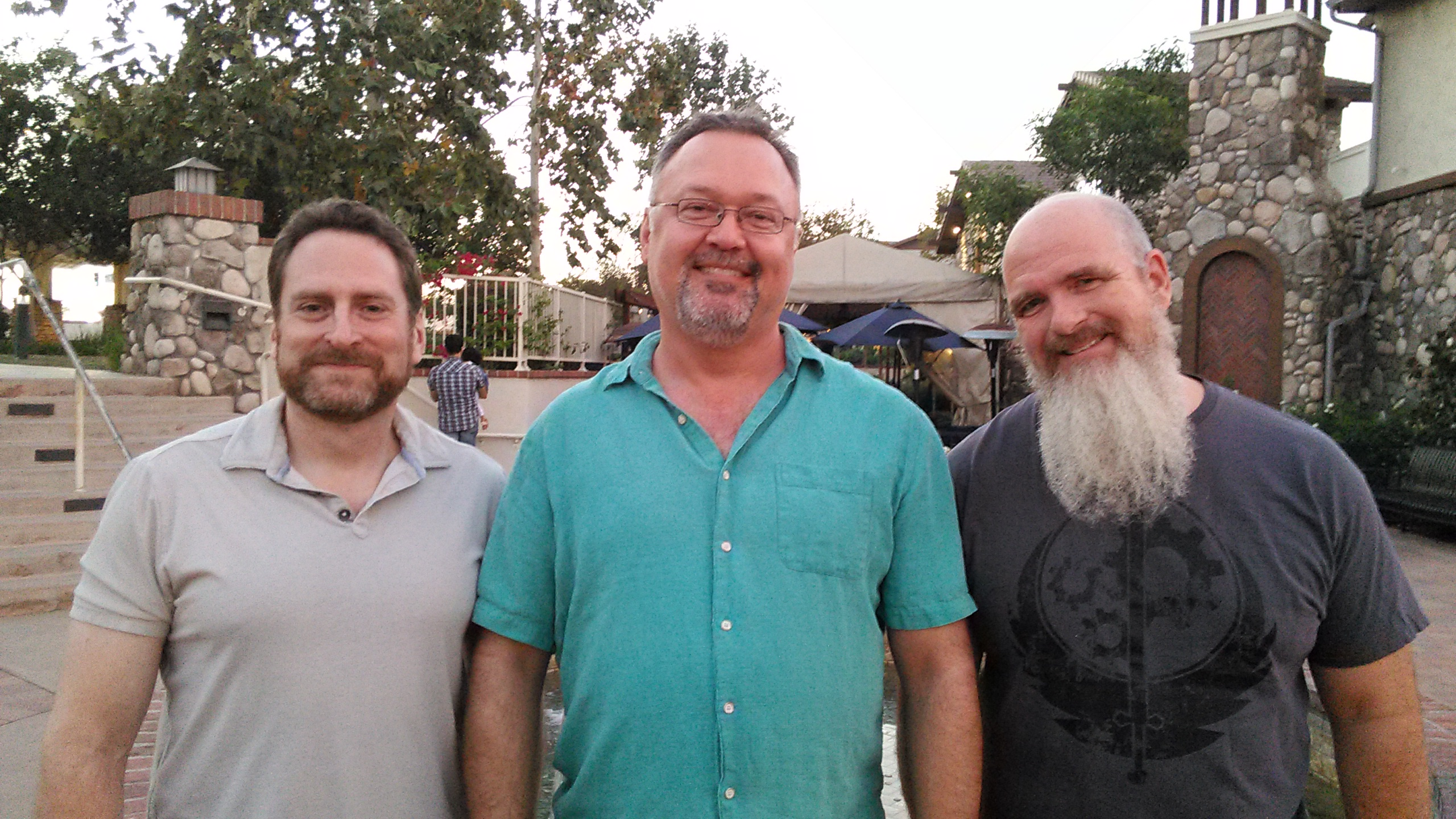
Fallout creators Leonard Boyarsky, Tim Cain and Jason Anderson

Anderson carried out a plethora of tasks at Troika. While doing considerable work on two of the company's three released titles (Arcanum: Of Steamworks and Magick Obscura and Vampire: The Masquerade – Bloodlines), he also handled managerial tasks related to running the company. These included creating design documents for future games, managing projects, interactions with publishers and directing artists.

Arcanum was the first game from Troika Games. The initial design of the game was conceived by Cain, Anderson and Boyarsky after leaving Interplay. While reflecting on what game to make next, they decided that they wanted their turn at making an RPG set in a fantasy setting. The post-apocalyptic setting of Fallout had been a conscious design-choice to distance themselves from fantasy-titles like the Might and Magic series and other games based on Dungeons and Dragons. However, they did not want to make a ‘typical’ fantasy game set in the 14th century, often the case for games in the genre. Arcanum: Of Steamworks and Magick Obscura was thus set in the 18th century, imagining what would happen in a world where magic co-existed with the industrial revolution. Indeed, the desire to mix magic and technology was a given from the start. They drafted ideas for how each race in the world would be affected by technology, with Boyarsky stating that "the orcs would be used as the slaves of all the capitalist machinery". Cain remembers that ideas came swiftly, and they were happy with the outline of the game. Cain, Anderson and Boyarsky worked on the initial design of Arcanum by themselves for five months until they landed a contract by with Sierra Entertainment, which let them expand the team to 12 people.

Because Arcanum was made with a modest sized team (later increased to 14 people), Anderson took on a number of different responsibilities. These included art, movies, design, dialogue, scripting, music and sound effects. Added to this came also business-related tasks where he wrote business plans, managed budgeting, wrote proposals, pitched games to publishers, co-negotiated contracts and created and maintained schedules. The decision to keep the team small was a decision that would cost the team many nights and weekends, remembers Boyarsky. He recalls that the company was in a near constant state of ‘crunch mode’ (working beyond the normal 40-hour work week), and the staff always felt under pressure.

According to Boyarsky, Troika's original goal had been to work exclusively for one publisher, as a kind of their external RPG dev team. This way, they thought they would maintain a staple flow of contracts. Sierra Entertainment was their first choice of publisher, which kept the team busy even while they were unsure about making an Arcanum sequel. But when Sierra faced economic problems, the partnership with Troika was cut short.

Having concluded their dealings with Sierra Entertainment, Troika got a contract from Atari to work on The Temple of Elemental Evil in 2001. Cain spearheaded that project, which was released in 2003 to generally favorable reviews.

Anderson and Boyarsky would focus on a game set in the Vampire: The Masquerade universe. Boyarsky expressed the desire to build a game in a new setting, to challenge themselves ." The project began when Boyarsky and Anderson were invited to Seattle to see the latest build of the Source engine. Subsequently, they had discussions with Scott Lynch of Valve about using the Source game engine to create a brand new, groundbreaking first-person RPG. Troika was thus the first external team to be allowed using the Source engine. Activision (who had recently founded a partnership with Valve), suggested them to make a game using the Vampire: The Masquerade setting, for which they had the license. Troika began to research the World of Darkness and the Vampire system before agreeing that it would be a great fit. "

Anderson's responsibilities on Vampire: The Masquerade – Bloodlines included game design, level design and creation, sound effects, and design and implementation of interface and artwork. He liked the game world compared to his last two games (Fallout and Arcanum)and was happy that he able to make a game about vampires. However, he was not familiar with the Vampire: The Masquerade table-top games, and had to do some research to understand the setting and translate it to a video-game experience. Anderson relied on player experiences from colleagues and online forums, to understand what drew players to the game. First, he learned that the main point liked was Vampire's focus on character interaction with stats, items, and powers taking a backseat. Main elements for the players’ experiences were constantly changing intricacies of the world and vampiric society. Second, Anderson had to reproduce the pen-and-paper experience to satisfy fans of the setting and give newcomers an accurate introduction. Generally, the character attributes from Vampire were easily implemented into the video-game format, while others (such as ‘knowledge of law') had to be left out. Also, dice rolls and randomness were removed as they would not have fit in a first-person setting. Disciplines were confusing and thus challenging to implement. Thus, a deviation from the board game was made to streamline the disciplines into the game. Furthermore, Anderson designed the ‘haunted mansion’ level of the game, which is famous for being "eerily atmospheric" and well-paced. Boyarsky recalls that "several people took turns trying to make that work, but it wasn’t until Jason took it over that it really began to shine".

The development of Bloodlines was challenging for Troika. First, compared to the relative freedom they enjoyed during the development of Arcanum, Vampire's design choices had more checks and balances as both White Wolf and Activision wanted to validate their decisions. Second, the deteriorating working relationship with Activision and constant deadlines had damaged the morale of the development staff. Cain recalls an embargo being placed on the game. In fact, Troika was not allowed to work on it for several months before the release date, as Activision kept a gold version master until the release date. Any patches and fixes that Troika worked on, where thus not allowed to be included in the game. This also included improvements made to the Source engine such as advancements in physics, modelling and facial animation which Bloodlines did not have. The embargo hurt the morale of the team, who had finished a game that could not be shipped, changed, or talked about. Furthermore, Activision wanted to ship it as soon as possible, resulting in many features being cut and forcing the Troika staff to work long hours. Anderson later stated that the vast majority of Bloodline's development time was spent in 'crunch-mode' . While Bloodlines received favorable reviews and praise from RPG fans, its numerous bug and imperfections were flagrant. Anderson reflected that their publishers were not willing to give the Troika team the necessary time to polish their games, pulling an unfinished product from their hands. Furthermore, Cain adds that they never imagined that Activision would ship Vampire on the same day as Half-Life 2. He finds that postponing launch day would have given the team time to polish the game using a stable engine, avoiding direct competition with the very popular Half-Life 2.

Bloodlines was finally released on 16 November 2004 and has become somewhat of a cult classic among RPGs, which is still being updated to this day. Nevertheless, initial sales figures were weak, failing to ensure financial stability to the company. They continued to present game ideas to publishers, Anderson's favorite being "Dreadlands, an [MMOG] set in mythical mid 19th century Eastern Europe". They also worked on a game set in a post-apocalyptic setting reminiscent of Fallout, for which an engine demonstration was released. However, Troika faced difficulty finding new publisher deals, haunted by a track record of great ideas with lackluster implementation. Consequently, Troika shut down their business operations in 2005. Reminiscent on the fate of Troika, Anderson said that Troika's games were considered B-titles, Something that publishers shun away from. He adds, "Unfortunately, although our games had depth and vision, we were never able to release a game that had been thoroughly tested and rid of bugs".

Leonard Boyarsky has since joined Obsidian Entertainment on April 1, 2016, and is currently working on an unannounced RPG with Tim Cain. This made fans hope that Anderson might join the company as well, effectively reuniting the Troika team. In an interview with RPGCodex from September 2016, Boyarsky said that the three are still friends and meet several times per year. He remains positive towards bringing the team together again, although they would have to find new ways of working together, given the differing experiences they have all had over the years.

=== Post-Troika hiatus (2004 – 2007) ===
After Troika shut down, Anderson took some vacation with his wife and family. They decided that they needed a break from the entertainment industry, in order to spend more time together. 2004 had been a difficult year, with several family issues on top of the demise of Troika. Anderson, who is skilled in many facets of construction, spent a few months repairing his house, remodeling the kitchen and baths, removing the sound room and replacing the balcony. After selling the house, they settled down in Phoenix, Arizona and got active in the real estate business. His wife acquired her Real Estate License and the couple bought another old house, which Anderson spent around 3 months fixing. Anderson also home-schooled his daughters during this period.

While contemplating his return to the game industry, Anderson considered working at the new studios of his former Troika partners (Boyarsky and Cain subsequently found jobs at Blizzard Entertainment and Carbine Studios, respectively). However, Anderson did not get along with Boyarsky's project leader at Blizzard, and never got around to applying at Carbine. Moreover, he reflected on the seven years he spent with Boyarsky and Cain as "closely...related to a marriage", coupled with stressful publisher relations, frequent deadlines and the constant fear that the studio would have to close its doors. When the studio closed, they started seeing either other less frequently. However, Anderson "would like to work with them again someday".

Spending time away from game development also allowed Anderson to reflect on the aspects he liked and did not like about his career as a game designer. Also, he had the opportunity to enjoy playing games, regaining the enthusiasm he had upon first entering the industry.

=== Interplay Entertainment (October 2007 – February 2009) ===
In November 2007, it was announced that Interplay Entertainment had resumed development activities and hired Anderson to lead their first project . Anderson worked on Project V13 with fellow Fallout creator Chris Taylor. Although it was never officially stated, the project he worked on was believed to be a Fallout-related MMO. Interplay retained the rights for such a title after selling the Fallout rights to Bethesda Softworks. However, Bethesda later disputed this right in a legal case, which further stalled its development. Anderson had been in talks with Hervé Caen (Brian Fargo's successor after Titus Software's acquisition of Interplay Entertainment in 2001) about the project for nearly a year, and felt it was one of the few projects that could entice him to get back into the video-game industry. As Creative Director, Anderson was responsible for a putting a team together and overseeing progress on the game. Nevertheless, although he enjoyed working on the project, Anderson later decided to leave Interplay to accept an offer from InXile Entertainment who presented him with "a more stable opportunity".

=== InXile Entertainment (March 2009 – December 2010) ===
Anderson was hired as Creative Director at InXile Entertainment. His role was to do design work and elaborate on the story for Wasteland 2. Before successfully funding the project via Kickstarter, Brian Fargo attempted to generate publisher interest and secure their backing by having Anderson (Fallout lead designer), Mike Stackpole (lead designer on the first Wasteland) and someone who helped produce both games following the success of Fallout 3. Fargo was surprised at how little publisher interest there was. Subsequently, Anderson left the company before Wasteland 2 launched on Kickstarter. However, Anderson's work during his time with InXile was kept . The Kickstarter campaign directly mentions Anderson's work on the storyline, which was retained for the final game.

=== Turtle Rock Studios (2011–2019) ===
Anderson subsequently joined Turtle Rock Studios in 2011. They shipped the first-person shooter Evolve in 2015. Anderson's exact role in that project is unknown, although he is credited for level design on the company's forum. He has stated that there are no titles at the company, as everyone is equal.

=== InXile Entertainment (2019–present) ===
On March 26, 2019, Anderson re-joined InXile Entertainment. This was announced by Chad Moore on Twitter, whom Anderson had worked with both at Interplay and Troika. Since both InXile and Obsidian were acquired by Microsoft, this in-directly reunites the Troika: Tim Cain, Leonard Boyarsky and Jason Anderson.

On June 11, 2023, Xbox Games Showcase revealed the new game he has been working on in collaboration with Chad Moore: Clockwork Revolution.

== Works ==
Title	Year	Role
USCF Chess	1993	Artist
Stonekeep	1995	Artist/Designer
Fallout	1997	Lead Technical Artist, original game design
Fallout 2	1998	Main story outline
Arcanum: Of Steamworks and Magick Obscura	2001	Creative principal
Vampire: The Masquerade – Bloodlines	2004	Creative Director
Project V13	2007	Creative Director
Hunted: The Demon's Forge	2011	Design/Secrets and Exploration
Wasteland 2	2014	Main Story Author
Evolve	2015	Unknown
Clockwork Revolution	TBA	Principal Designer

== Personal life ==
Apart from video games, music is one of Anderson's main hobbies. He has had an ear for music since being a child, and has composed several pieces on his own. He enjoys playing his guitar and prefers heavy, aggressive music such as Quicksand, Tool and Sepultura, which he listened to during the development of Fallout.
