= Clockwork Revolution =

Upcoming video game

- Developer: InXile Entertainment (Note: Additional work by Shapeshifter Games)
- Publisher: Xbox Game Studios
- Director: Chad Moore
- Producer: Brian Fargo
- Designer: Jason D. Anderson
- Engine: Unreal Engine 5
- Platforms: Windows; Xbox Series X/S
- Release: 2027
- Genre: Action role-playing
- Mode: Single-player

Clockwork Revolution is an upcoming action role-playing video game developed by InXile Entertainment and published by Xbox Game Studios. The game is scheduled to be released for Windows and Xbox Series X/S in 2027.

== Gameplay ==
Clockwork Revolution is a steampunk-themed action role-playing game played from a first-person perspective. The game incorporates time-manipulation mechanics, character creation, and traditional RPG systems. A central feature is the Chronometer, a time-travel device that allows the player to visit past versions of Avalon, alter historical events, and return to the present to observe the resulting changes. These alterations can have both minor and major effects on characters, districts, and social conditions within the city.

Combat is based on first-person shooting and uses a mixture of steampunk technology and late 19th-century weapon designs. Firearms include revolvers, lever-action repeaters, and modified Gatling-style guns, along with more advanced steam-powered equipment. Weapons and gadgets, such as deployable devices and steampunk-style explosives can be modified and customized at a weapon bench. The game's environmental and narrative systems are designed to react to the player's choices, influencing dialogue, character relationships, and the overall state of the world.

Clockwork Revolution features a detailed character creation system described by the developers as the most expensive asset in the game. The system affects more than appearance; NPCs respond differently to the player depending on their chosen traits and statistics. For example, in-game reports of crimes or events will vary based on how the player builds their character, and dialogue may change accordingly.

== Plot ==
The game is set in Avalon, a steampunk metropolis modeled on a Victorian-era society. In Avalon, wealthy industrialists commonly use ornate clockwork prosthetics, and mechanical servants are employed throughout the city. Much of the city's technological progress is tied to the actions of Lady Ironwood, who uses time-travel technology to alter events in Avalon's past. These interventions are intended to preserve a social and economic hierarchy that benefits Ironwood and the upper class.

The player controls Morgan Vanette, a customizable and voiced protagonist who becomes involved in the consequences of these temporal manipulations. By traveling into the past and changing historical events, players can influence the state of Avalon in the present, affecting characters, districts, and social conditions. The narrative also includes political elements, featuring multiple factions and ideologies within the city that the player may encounter or align with during the story.

== Development ==
Clockwork Revolution is inXile Entertainment's first AAA game under Xbox Game Studios and their largest project in terms of scope and budget. Clockwork Revolution is an action role-playing game led by Chad Moore as game director and Jason D. Anderson as principal designer. Concept and early development began before the release of Wasteland 3 in 2020. The studio hired talent from developers such as Rockstar Games, Bungie, and Blizzard Entertainment to improve the game's cinematics, narrative interactions, lighting, animation, and gunplay.

On January 30, 2024, InXile Entertainment announced that they are partnering with the newly founded video game studio Shapeshifter Games to develop Clockwork Revolution. Shapeshifter Games, a studio founded by former Volition developers, will offer co-development support for Clockwork Revolution.

According to producer Brian Fargo, the game will be at least 20 hours long without side content, and the studio has already written 750,000 words of dialogue for the game as of August 2025.

== Marketing ==
The game was first announced at the Xbox Games Showcase on June 12, 2023. Two years later, at the Xbox Games Showcase in June 2025, a new five-minute trailer was released, showcasing gameplay and providing a closer look at the story and characters. The game is scheduled to be released for Windows and Xbox Series X/S. On June 7, 2026, Xbox announced that Clockwork Revolution would be released as an Xbox console exclusive.
