= The Outer Worlds =

2019 video game

- Developer: Obsidian Entertainment (Note: Virtuos developed the Switch version and the Spacer's Choice Edition.)
- Publisher: Private Division
- Directors: Leonard Boyarsky; Tim Cain
- Producer: Eric DeMilt
- Designer: Charles Staples
- Programmer: Mark DeGeorge
- Artist: Daniel Alpert
- Writer: Leonard Boyarsky
- Composer: Justin E. Bell
- Engine: Unreal Engine 4
- Platforms: PlayStation 4; Windows; Xbox One; Nintendo Switch; PlayStation 5; Xbox Series X/S
- Release: October 25, 2019: PS4, Windows, Xbox One; October 25, 2019; Nintendo Switch; June 5, 2020; PS5, Xbox Series X/S; March 7, 2023
- Genre: Action role-playing
- Mode: Single-player

The Outer Worlds is a 2019 action role-playing game developed by Obsidian Entertainment and published by Private Division. Set in an alternate future, the game takes place in Halcyon, a distant planetary system colonized by megacorporations. In the game, players assume control of a passenger from a lost colony ship, who is revived by a scientist and tasked with rescuing their fellow colonists and taking down the corporations responsible for the colony's impending doom. The game is played from a first-person perspective, and players can use combat, stealth, or dialog (persuasion, lying and intimidation) options when encountering potentially hostile non-player characters. Players can make numerous dialog decisions which influence the branching story.

Led by Tim Cain and Leonard Boyarsky, the creators of the Fallout series, the development of The Outer Worlds began in April 2016. Firefly, Futurama and Deadwood all inspired the game's world and characters. The team used striking color to depict its game world, and the team was influenced by the Art Nouveau style and the works of Alphonse Mucha and Moebius. The game was envisioned to be narrower in scope compared to other role-playing games although a number of locations and characters were still cut due to time and budget constraints, as well as the team's unfamiliarity with using the game's engine. It was announced in December 2018 and then released for PlayStation 4, Windows, and Xbox One in October 2019, with the Nintendo Switch port released in June 2020. Obsidian released two downloadable content packs, and a remastered version was released in March 2023 for PlayStation 5, Windows and Xbox Series X/S as The Outer Worlds: Spacer's Choice Edition.

The Outer Worlds has received generally positive reviews. Critics generally praised the game's writing, characters, freedom of choice, and art direction, though its combat was criticized for being bland. Many critics noted its similarity to the Fallout series. The Switch version was criticized for its technical issues. It was nominated for several end-of-year accolades, including Game of the Year at The Game Awards 2019. It was a commercial success, selling over four million units by August 2021, surpassing expectations. A sequel, The Outer Worlds 2, was released in 2025 by Obsidian and publisher Xbox Game Studios.

== Gameplay ==
In this gameplay screenshot, the player character is exploring the outskirts of Edgewater with Parvati Holcomb, one of the game's companions.

The Outer Worlds is an action role-playing video game played from a first-person perspective. At the beginning of the game, players create their avatar (dubbed the Stranger in-game) and are given six attribute points to distribute across six categories (strength, dexterity, intelligence, perception, charm and temperament). These attributes determine the character's baseline ability in combat, stealth, and engaging in interactions with other non-playable characters (NPCs). For instance, a character with points in strength has additional inventory space, while a character with points in charm and perception gains additional dialog options. Players also choose from one of 15 aptitudes which give minor gameplay bonuses. The chosen attributes and aptitude cannot be changed after character creation but players will get more attribute points as the game progresses.

A spaceship named the Unreliable serves as players' hub of operation, where players can select fast travel destinations on different planets in the Halcyon system. Each location in the game is a large, open space which can be explored freely. Players encounter various NPCs who offer side quests and optional objectives and reward them with experience and bits, which are used to purchase weapons and other items from vendors. Players make numerous dialog decisions which influence the game's branching story. They can respond to NPCs in various ways, such as acting heroically, maniacally, or even moronically if their character's intelligence attribute is set to below average. Players also need to manage their reputation among the different factions in the game. Helping a faction increases reputation, while committing crimes or killing members of a faction decreases it. High reputation with a faction provides benefits such as vendors offering discounts. Very low reputation results in members of that faction attempting to kill the player character on sight.

Several NPCs can also join the player character's party as a companions and participate in combat. Each companion has their own individual skills and special attacks, and they can develop their own skill specialization over the course of the game. Each companion also has an optional quest line that can be completed. While exploring, players can bring up to two companions while the rest stay on the ship. The presence of a companion may unlock additional dialog options, and give players a passive bonus to their stats. Players can also manually direct the companions and adjust their combat AI. Each companion has their own weapons and armor, though they can be changed by players. The player character and companions have a limited carrying capacity (based on the strength stat), and can enter a state of "encumbrance" if they carry too many items or wear overly heavy armor. In this state, characters can no longer sprint or fast travel.

=== Combat ===
Players can play offensively by using the game's assortment of firearms and melee weapons. (Note: Spacer's Choice Edition allows players to also use grenades.) Some weapons have unique damage types, allowing players to inflict elemental damage on enemies. Weapons are divided into rarity; the rarer the weapon, the stronger they are. Weapons break down with use but they can be repaired at workbenches with weapon parts. They can be further customized and upgraded to further improve their efficiency. Weapons and armor, which boosts defense, are collected through exploring the game world, looting enemy corpses, or purchasing from vendors. There are also five unique "Science Weapons" with special and unusual effects. In combat players can enter a "Tactical Time Dilation" (TTD) state, which briefly slows down time and reveals opponents' health statistics. Targeting specific parts of an enemy during TTD enables players to inflict status ailments. For instance, an enemy will become crippled if their legs are attacked.

Players can use stealth tactics, such hiding in long grass and avoiding enemy's line of sight to not be detected. Investing in stealth skills allows players to lockpick, pickpocket other NPCs, and wear a disguise to infiltrate otherwise restricted areas. Players can also use persuasion, lying or intimidation to avoid combat altogether. A large number of quests in the game can be resolved in a non-violent ways, though it is also possible to complete the game despite killing all NPCs. As players progress in the game, they gain experience, allowing them to level up. They can then unlock perks which grant single bonuses or effects and spend points on seven different skill trees (Melee, Ranged, Defense, Dialog, Stealth, Tech and Leadership). Once sufficient points are invested in a skill tree, players can upgrade individual skills in each skill tree, and receives threshold benefits that further boost the player character's ability. Players may also opt to gain flaws, which provide a debuff, in exchange for an additional perk point. These can be obtained when players fail certain gameplay segment repeatedly or engages in harming behaviors such as alcohol abuse or frequently falling from height.

== Synopsis ==
=== Setting ===
The Outer Worlds is set in an alternate future that diverged in the year 1901, when U.S. President William McKinley was never assassinated. As a result, Theodore Roosevelt didn't succeed him, and the great business trusts of the era were never broken up, leading to a hyper-corporate, class-centric society dominated by powerful megacorporations. In this timeline's future, following a global war and the invention of faster-than-light travel, various corporations began sponsoring the colonization of outer space, often terraforming alien planets with varying results. Thousands of Earth residents would sign up for the chance of a fresh start in a new star system. The art, architecture, and technology of the colonies display a unique blend of Art Nouveau, Old West, steampunk, and dieselpunk aesthetics.

On the outskirts of this new frontier is the colony of Halcyon, a star system consisting of six planets: Hephaestus, Tartarus, Terra 2, Olympus (and its moon Monarch), Typhon, and Eridanos. The system also contains the Charybdis Cluster, an asteroid cluster that includes the large colonized asteroids Scylla and Gorgon. Being the most distant colony from Earth, travel to Halcyon requires the usage of both a faster-than-light starship and a ten-year cryosleep for its passengers.

The colony was founded and is now governed by the Halcyon Holdings Corporation, a coalition of ten megacorporations that jointly purchased and settled the system, with the intention of operating it as a network of company towns. In the year 2285, two colony ships, the Hope and the Groundbreaker, departed from Earth to colonize Halcyon. The Groundbreaker arrived as planned, and most of the colonists went on to settle the planets Terra 1 (later renamed Monarch) and Terra 2. The ship's crew, meanwhile, converted the Groundbreaker into an independent port, still maintained and operated by the original crew's descendants. The Hope, on the other hand, vanished in transit, eventually slipping into myth among the colonists of Halcyon.

=== Plot ===
In 2355, seventy years after its disappearance, the lost colony ship Hope is rediscovered drifting on the outskirts of the Halcyon system by scientist Phineas Vernon Welles, who manages to safely revive one of its thousands of cryogenically frozen passengers, whom the player controls and is referred to as the “Stranger”. Welles informs the Stranger that the colonists of Halcyon are struggling due to the incompetence and greed of its governing body, the Halcyon Holdings Corporate Board. He believes that reviving the rest of the Hope's passengers, many of whom possess knowledge and skills necessary for the colony's survival, will help to save Halcyon from collapse. To do so, Welles tasks the Stranger with securing the rest of the necessary resources. He first sends the Stranger to the planet Terra 2 to rendezvous with smuggler Alex Hawthorne, who will assist with their mission. However, upon reaching the planet's surface, the Stranger's escape pod accidentally lands on and crushes Hawthorne. With no other way off the planet, they take control of Hawthorne's ship, the Unreliable, and assume the dead smuggler's identity. As the Stranger explores Halcyon and grows their team of allies, they learn that Welles is wanted by the Board for acts of alleged terrorism and illegal human experimentation. At any point while aiding Welles, they can choose to betray him and assist the Board in capturing him.

The Stranger eventually learns that a large shipment of dimethyl sulfoxide, the primary chemical needed by Welles to revive the rest of the Hope's passengers, has recently been purchased and received by Earth's representative on Halcyon, Aloysius Clarke. Upon confronting him at his home in the colony's capital city of Byzantium, they learn that he is actually being held under house arrest and has been granted no real power by the Board. Having used Clarkes’ name and high profile to secure the valuable shipment, the true recipient is revealed to be the Chairman of the Corporate Board, Charles Rockwell.

While searching Rockwell's office at the Board's headquarters, the Stranger uncovers Rockwell's ultimate goal: to conserve Halcyon's limited resources for the Board and the corporate elite of Byzantium, all working-class colonists will soon be forced to enter cryosleep, only being revived for short periods of hard labor before being frozen again, in a cycle lasting as long as physically possible, all of which taking place under the more appealing name the "Lifetime Employment Program". The workers are to be stored inside the recently rediscovered Hope, while the original passengers will be kept frozen and ejected into outer space to provide more room. However, as extended periods of cryosleep eventually cause the human body to liquidate, the Board is using the dimethyl sulfoxide on human test subjects to learn how to safely revive the workers, repeatedly and indefinitely. The Stranger also learns that Welles used to work on this project for the Board before becoming disenfranchised by their motives, and that he had unsuccessfully attempted to revive at least 12 of the Hope's passengers before succeeding with the Stranger. After making these revelations, the Stranger breaks into the Board's research facility and steals the chemicals, killing the frozen test subjects depending on how much the player chooses to take.

After receiving the necessary supplies, Welles directs the Stranger to infiltrate the Hope and warp it into orbit above Terra 2, in close proximity to his hidden laboratory so he can begin reviving the rest of the Hope's colonists. Sophia Akande, the Adjutant of the Board and the colony's de facto leader, instead requests that the Stranger warp the Hope to the planet Tartarus, home to the Board's infamous Labyrinth prison complex, to apprehend Welles and begin implementing the Lifetime Employment Program. After reactivating the Hope, the subsequent events depend on where the Stranger chooses to send the ship:

- If the Stranger chooses to override the navigation systems and pilot the ship manually (and has been given low intelligence by the player), the Hope is launched straight into Halcyon's sun, killing everyone onboard and ending the game.
- If the Hope is warped to Terra 2, the Board will find and raid Welles' lab and take him to the Labyrinth on Tartarus. The Stranger and their allies fight their way through the prison to free Welles and confront Akande, resulting in either her surrender or her death in combat.
- If the Hope is warped to Tartarus, an enraged Welles will travel there himself, incite a riot in the Labyrinth and take Akande hostage in a final act of desperation. The Stranger must reach Welles and confront him, forcing him to release Akande either peacefully or by force.

Regardless of either outcome, the Stranger learns thereafter that all contact with Earth has been lost, and that a Board-owned ship recently vanished while attempting to leave the Halcyon system. With no possibility of the colony receiving any outside help, the Stranger and their allies decide they can only push forward with the future they have chosen. If the Stranger helped Welles, the pair begin the process of reviving the Hope's passengers, who in turn work to slowly improve the colony's quality of life, while the Board and their corporate oligarchy slowly collapse. If they sided with the Board, however, the Lifetime Employment Program is fully implemented, allowing the elite to live in luxury in Byzantium, while the workers are exploited even more, their cycle of intermittent cryostasis and labor continuing well into the foreseeable future.

=== Peril on Gorgon ===
The Stranger receives a package containing a human arm and a message from freelancer Lucky Montoya, urging Alex Hawthorne (the smuggler who was crushed by the Stranger earlier, and whose ship was taken by the Stranger) to complete the lucrative job given to him by a woman named Minnie Ambrose. Upon meeting at her family's dilapidated mansion on the asteroid Gorgon, she tasks the Stranger with finding journals belonging to her mother Olivia Ambrose, a former high-ranking scientist for the megacorporation Spacer's Choice who disappeared shortly after the failure of a secret project she supervised.

While working to gain access to the project's abandoned research facility, the Stranger and their team gradually learn that the project was researching a chemical discovered on Gorgon that was ultimately used to make Adrena-Time, a stimulant known to drive its users to violence and insanity, as evidenced by Halcyon's large population of hostile marauders. Disgusted by her corporate sponsors’ lack of concern for the drug's side effects and the deaths of the project's human test subjects, Olivia ultimately sabotaged the project and went into hiding. The team also learns that Minnie is secretly working in collaboration with Spacer's Choice, hoping to use information from her mother's journals to resume Adrena-Time's production and improve her family's social standing.

The Stranger can choose to either help Olivia by destroying the drug's production facility, or help Minnie by reactivating it; however, a third option allows the Stranger to convince the pair to reconcile and use their combined knowledge to develop a cure for Adrena-Time's side effects and return Halcyon's marauders to normalcy.

=== Murder on Eridanos ===
The Stranger is summoned to the Grand Colonial Hotel above the gas giant Eridanos to solve the recent murder of famed actress Ruth Bellamy, known for playing the action hero "Halcyon Helen". While searching for clues and interviewing suspects, a nearby distillery owned by the corporation Rizzo's suddenly falls under attack by an unknown party. Upon arriving at the scene, the attacker is revealed to be a living Ruth Bellamy, whose twin sister Belinda had been the actual murder victim while posing as "Halcyon Helen" (a persona secretly shared by the sisters).

Ruth reveals that she had been invited to Eridanos by Rizzo's to promote their release of a new flavor of vodka, only for the sisters to learn that, in order to improve customer satisfaction, the company made the alcohol with a species of happiness-inducing parasites native to the planet. Before they could make the truth public, Belinda was killed as part of a cover-up by the distillery's administrator Quinton Ludovico, unaware of the existence of a second "Halcyon Helen". The Stranger can choose to either aid Ruth in destroying the distillery and preventing the parasites from spreading across the colony, or side with Ludovico by protecting the distillery and allowing the spread to occur.

== Development ==
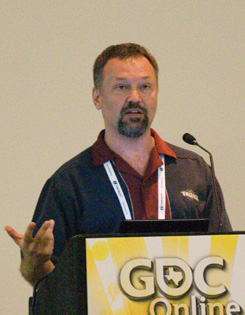
Tim Cain

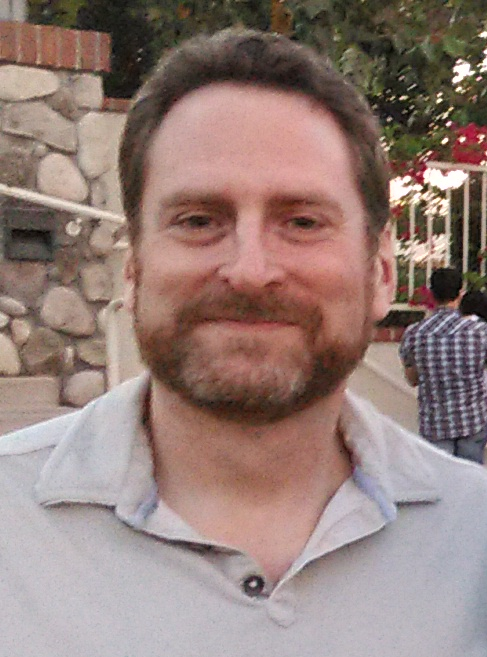
Leonard Boyarsky

Cain and Boyarsky, the creators of the Fallout series, served as the game's directors.

The Outer Worlds was developed by Obsidian Entertainment, the developer behind Fallout: New Vegas. Tim Cain and Leonard Boyarsky, two creators of the Fallout series, served as the game's directors. Both worked together at Interplay Entertainment and Troika Games before departing for other studios. Cain joined Obsidian in 2011, and when he was given the opportunity to create a new intellectual property for the company in April 2016, he invited Boyarsky to join him as his co-director.

=== Gameplay ===
A prototype was put together six months after development began, showcasing the three pillars of gameplay: combat, stealth and dialogue. The team wanted players to build and optimize their character as they see fit, so the team did not introduce any character class. The upgrade system allowed players to create "hybrid" characters who excel at two of three ways of gameplay (combat, stealth or dialogue). Originally the player character had access to special abilities, though they were later moved to companion skills so the companions would be more involved in combat and as a way to further highlight their personalities. The team also designed options for players who favor combat over dialogue, and developed alternative ways for players to obtain essential information should the NPCs involved in quests be killed. A pacifist way of completing the game was planned, although this was scrapped because it created many unforeseen technical issues.

The game was designed to be accessible to all play styles. The Tactical Time Dilation system, which briefly slows down time during combat, was designed to prevent new players from being overwhelmed, while also giving veteran players more options to defeat their opponents. Weapons in the game vary in level as well as branding. For instance, Spacer's Choice provides clunky guns at a cheap price, while other brands provide additional modification slots. These weapons were designed to be wacky, outlandish and unconventional, and the ideas for some of them originated from gameplay bugs. Flaws were introduced as a permanent debuff to players in exchange for an additional point in a stat. They were designed to alter the game's difficulty without fundamentally changing the overall experience. Character creation was significantly streamlined compared to other RPGs. The team wanted players to customize their characters as they progress, and did not want to overwhelm them with information early in the game. It also actively prevents players from specializing until later in the game, with a system that allows multiple attributes to be upgraded at once.

=== Story and characters ===
Boyarsky led the writing team and placed a large emphasis on developing the game's characters. The player character and Phineas Welles were created early in development. Inspired by Fallout, the player character was a frozen colonist who is not familiar with the new world. Players will gradually learn more about the Halcyon colony and its inhabitants alongside the protagonist. The player character therefore, was considered to be an unknown variable in a world where everyone has become accustomed to corporate rule. The main character was a silent protagonist as the team preferred a blank state character whose action and personality were completely shaped by players as they play. Boyarsky said that the game provided players with options to shape their character, who can be heroic, evil, or dumb. The narrative choices were designed to be morally grey. The game informs players of the consequences of their actions, and it is up to them to decide "what [they] care about".

According to the team, the companions were "more involved" in the story of The Outer Worlds when compared with Obsidian's previous games. Most of the companions were based on "basic archetypes" with the exception of Ellie and Felix, who originally were placeholder companions in the vertical slice of the game. These characters were usually deeply involved in a conflict, and once the conflict is resolved, the narrative designer responsible for writing the character will be free to take them to any direction. The Outer Worlds originally featured six human companions, but one was replaced with the janitor robot SAM due to time constraints. Ellie was described as being a pirate with a dubious moral compass; Parvati was considered to be a "sweet" and "naive" mechanic who did not fit into the hyper-corporate society well; Felix was described as a "rebel without a cause" who only wanted to destroy the establishment; Nyoka was envisioned as being a fierce huntress, and Max was designed as a "travelling priest". The Board is not depicted as a completely antagonistic figure. Representatives from the Board attempt to persuade the player character to join their cause because they feel that what they are doing is ultimately good for the colony. Welles, who was compared to a "mad scientist" by the team, was inspired by Rick from Rick and Morty and Walter Bishop in Fringe. The game ends with the player character siding with either Welles or the Board, but it provides ample opportunities for them to double cross anyone.

=== World design ===
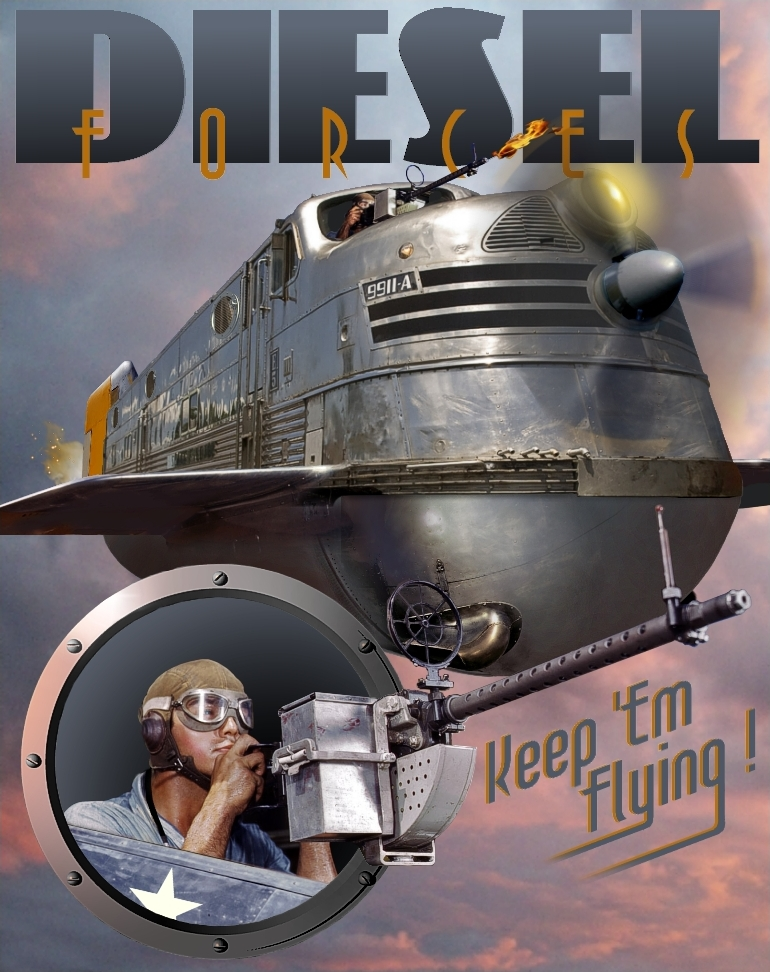
The environments and art style of the game were inspired by dieselpunk art.

Art director Daniel Alpert described the game's aesthetics as the "Old West" set in the future. Halcyon was envisioned to be a remote space colony with a "strong element of heavy machinery". The art team utilized the Art Nouveau style to depict the corporations and large cities in the game to reflect their elitist nature. The Outer Worlds uses vibrant colors to depict its world, and the team was inspired by works of Alphonse Mucha and Moebius. The use of striking color also helped the world to feel more "alien", so that Halcyon will be "familiar, but also slightly different" to players. Loading screens features propaganda images made by the Board to depict the consequences of players' action. Each corporation also has its own color scheme, so that players can identify various company towns easily. Boyarsky has said that the environments and art style of the game were inspired by dieselpunk art.

The universe of the game was inspired by Fallout, Firefly, and Futurama. The corporations were inspired by mining towns in the early 20th century. Boyarsky described the Halcyon system as a "corporate utopia" in which the Board exerted control on every aspect of life, and people were taught to place the companies they worked for above themselves from birth. While the game explores themes such as capitalism and bureaucracy, it was not intended to be "politically charged" and the team did not want to lecture players on these topics. Despite its dystopian setting, it has a humorous tone. Cain and Boyarsky felt that the subject matter was too grim and the experience would become monotonous and depressing without a change in tone. The team hoped to seek a balance between silliness and drama when creating the narrative so that the juxtaposition between its dark themes and lighthearted delivery will create more "emotional resonance" with their audience. According to Cain, the tone of the story becomes progressively dark as players progress. The writing team was also inspired by Deadwood, Brazil, True Grit, and the works of the Coen brothers and Wes Anderson.

The game features a number of locations: Terra-1 is a feral, lawless planet whose occupants staged an uprising against the Board, while Terra-2 is more refined and more influenced by corporatism. Roseway and its quests were among the first to be created, and served as a guide for the creation of other locations. Each region had its own narrative while being tied to the overarching story. The team avoided creating a large continuous environment, because that would not generate "the space opera fantasy/pulp sci-fi fantasy feel" that the team was aiming for. Several locations were cut early in development, such as an overworld region in Terra-2 that would connect various settlements such as Byzantium and Edgewater, partly due to budget constraints and partly due to the team's unfamiliarity with the Unreal Engine 4. This resulted in the critical path of the game being shorter than expected. Some of the scrapped content was integrated into a location set on an asteroid (Scylla), which was created quickly since it had no settlement and did not require intricate art design. Obsidian compared the length of The Outer Worlds to Star Wars: Knights of the Old Republic II, which takes players between 15 and 40 hours to complete depending on their playstyle. The game's smaller scope allowed the team to focus more development time on developing alternate paths and narrative choices.

== Release ==
In December 2017, Private Division, an independent publishing division under Take-Two Interactive, announced the project as their first slate of games to publish. The first trailer for the game premiered at The Game Awards 2018. Though Obsidian was in the process of being acquired by Microsoft Studios at the time of the game's announcement, the project had been under development before that point, and Take-Two secured the publishing rights prior to Microsoft's acquisition offer. The Outer Worlds was released for PlayStation 4, Windows, and Xbox One on October 25, 2019. In March 2019, it was announced that the game would release exclusively on the Epic Games Store and Microsoft Store, with its original Steam release being delayed until October 23, 2020. Fan response to the announcement was negative. A Nintendo Switch version was originally scheduled to be released on March 6, 2020, but was delayed to June 5 due to issues caused by the COVID-19 pandemic. The Switch version was developed by Virtuos.

The game's first piece of downloadable content (DLC), Peril on Gorgon, was released on September 9, 2020. The DLC pack added a new location, a new story campaign, and three new science weapons. In this pack, the Stranger must investigate a science outpost located on an asteroid and uncover the mystery behind a failed science project. The second DLC, titled Murder on Eridanos, was released on March 17, 2021. In this pack, the Stranger must solve the murder case of a famous actress named Halcyon Helen. Both DLC packs were included in the game's season pass. On March 7, 2023, a remastered version of the game called The Outer Worlds: Spacer's Choice Edition, also developed by Virtuos, was released for PlayStation 5, PC, and Xbox Series X/S. Spacer's Choice Edition has updated visuals and a higher level cap, and includes the base game and all downloadable content. The remaster has been criticized for introducing stutter to the game and generally performing worse than the original.

In April 2026, it was announced that the original version of the game and its DLC would be delisted on May 27th on all platforms where the Spacer's Choice Edition is available, with owners of the base game receiving Spacer's Choice Edition for free. In addition, it would be announced that Spacer's Choice Edition would receive new updates, with the first in April fixing long-standing issues while the second in May featured balance changes and added the ability to use grenades.

== Reception ==
Reception

Aggregate score
Aggregator	Score
Metacritic	PC: 82/100; PS4: 85/100; XONE: 85/100; NS: 66/100

Review scores
Publication	Score
Game Informer	9.25/10
GameSpot	9/10 (Switch) 6/10
GamesRadar+	4/5
IGN	8.5/10
PC Gamer (US)	79/100
The Guardian	5/5
VentureBeat	91/100
VG247	3/5

=== Critical reception ===
The Outer Worlds received "generally favorable" reviews from critics for most platforms, with the exception of the Nintendo Switch version which received "mixed or average" reviews, according to review aggregator website Metacritic. The Switch version was criticized for its downgraded visuals and technical limitations.

Many critics noted its similarity to Fallout games. Sam Machkovech from Ars Technica wrote that the game was a "dizzying, dense shot at reclaiming the indisputable glory of Fallout: New Vegas". Adam Rosenberg from Mashable also remarked that The Outer Worlds was essentially a Fallout game but one with its own distinct sense of identity. The free-form character building was strongly praised by critics for allowing each player to have a distinct experience, encouraging them to experiment with different gameplay styles, and increasing the game's replayability. Joe Juba from Game Informer wrote that the game's flexibility made the game "satisfying" to play for supporting various play styles, and compared its space-faring narrative to Mass Effect. Its use of Unreal Engine was praised by GameSpot's Edmond Tran for making exploration and combat feel better than those from Fallout games. Some critics felt Obsidian played too safe with the title, with Eurogamer's Edwin Evans-Thirlwell calling the game forgettable.

Gameplay was considered to be serviceable, with several critics noting the lack of enemy variety. Alex Award from GamesRadar found it to be rudimentary and compared it unfavorably with other first-person shooters, while VentureBeat's Jason Wilson found the combat to be bland and the choice of weapons to be unimaginative. Several critics wrote that the gameplay was too easy in its standard difficulty mode. Matt Martin from VG247 felt that combat was uninteresting and an obstacle for exploration, Tom Senior from PC Gamer felt that its system were uncomplicated and generally lacked depth, while Steve Boxer, writing for The Guardian, praised the game not being too "complicated" to play. Tran praised the combat system for being fast-paced and hectic, and liked how the game offered numerous opportunities for players to progress. Dan Stapleton from IGN also wrote that Obsidian distinguished The Outer Worlds with "clever" adjustments such as the skills and perks systems, and original features such as flaws, and remarked the TTD system enabled faster and more precise gameplay. The game's environment diversity and art style were praised by critics for further enhancing its worldbuilding and making the experience feel consistently fresh.

The narrative received generally positive reviews. Boxer strongly praised the game's writing, calling them "razor-sharp", and enjoyed the game's comedic tone. He further praised the game's characters for being emotionally resonant. Avard also called the characters "the most well written, multi-faceted, intelligent and human NPCs" he had ever encountered in a video game, and liked the morally grey choices players had to make in the game. Wilson wrote that humor was the best part of The Outer Worlds, describing it as a "funny and an effective critique of corporate culture", though Machkovech and Evans-Thirlwell found the game's depiction of capitalism and usage of stale sci-fi tropes to be monotonous and one-dimensional. While the writing was praised, the story received mixed opinions. Avard described it as a "masterfully constructed branching narrative" and Stapleton, despite remarking that the game was not as big as those from BioWare and Bethesda Game Studios, wrote that the game nonetheless "packs in a large portion of flexible quests and conflicts" within its smaller locations. Several critics found the opening segment of the game to be slow and aimless, as the wider overarching story faded into background. Juba criticized the outdated quest design as choices always involved siding with one of two factions or finding an optimal third option through completing side quests. Fraser Brown, also from PC Gamer, called the game Obsidian's "most conservative RPG", and that decisions made by players rarely felt impactful. He compared the game unfavorably to Disco Elysium, which was released in the same month.

=== Sales ===
In the UK, it was the fourth best-selling game at retail in its week of release. It was the second best-selling video game in the US, behind only Call of Duty: Modern Warfare (2019). In November 2019, Take-Two Interactive revealed that the game had been a commercial success, significantly exceeding the company's expectations. By August 2021, it had sold over four million units, becoming one of Private Division's most successful games.

=== Awards ===
Year	Award	Category	Result	Ref.
2019	Game Critics Awards	Best of Show	Nominated	
2019	Game Critics Awards	Best Original Game	Won	
2019	Game Critics Awards	Best PC Game	Nominated	
2019	Game Critics Awards	Best Role-Playing Game	Nominated	
2019	2019 Golden Joystick Awards	Ultimate Game of the Year	Nominated	
2019	The Game Awards 2019	Game of the Year	Nominated	
2019	The Game Awards 2019	Best Narrative	Nominated	
2019	The Game Awards 2019	Best Performance (Ashly Burch)	Nominated	
2019	The Game Awards 2019	Best RPG	Nominated	
2020	New York Game Awards	Big Apple Award for Best Game of the Year	Won	
2020	New York Game Awards	Statue of Liberty Award for Best World	Nominated	
2020	New York Game Awards	Herman Melville Award for Best Writing	Nominated	
2020	23rd Annual D.I.C.E. Awards	Role-Playing Game of the Year	Won	
2020	23rd Annual D.I.C.E. Awards	Outstanding Achievement in Story	Nominated	
2020	20th Game Developers Choice Awards	Best Narrative	Nominated	
2020	SXSW Gaming Awards	Most Promising New Intellectual Property	Won	
2020	SXSW Gaming Awards	Excellence in Visual Achievement	Nominated	
2020	16th British Academy Games Awards	Narrative	Nominated	
2020	2020 Nebula Awards	Game Writing	Won	
2020	GLAAD Media Awards	Outstanding Video Game	Won	

== Sequel ==
On 13 June 2021, at Xbox and Bethesda's joint E3 presentation, The Outer Worlds 2 was announced. The game was released on October 29, 2025 for Windows, PlayStation 5, and Xbox Series X and Series S.

== Adaptations ==
In August 2024, it was revealed that the series would feature in Secret Level, a video game anthology series for Amazon Prime Video. That episode, The Outer Worlds: The Company We Keep, was released on December 17, 2024.
