= Grand Slam Bridge II =

1992 video game

- Developer: Presage Software (Windows)
- Publisher: Electronic Arts
- Platforms: DOS; Windows
- Release: 1992

Grand Slam Bridge II is a 1992 video game developed by American studio Presage Software. The game is an update to the 1986 game Grand Slam Bridge. A third entry Grand Slam Bridge III appeared on PC Data's sales chart in April 2000.

== Gameplay ==
Grand Slam Bridge II modernizes a classic card game by layering features atop its original 1986 predecessor. The gameplay remains centered on traditional bridge bidding and card play, bolstered by a suite of customization tools and visual options. Players can toggle between minimalist newspaper-style symbolic card displays and full 3D table graphics, with memory limitations occasionally forcing a return to the simpler interface. With options for customization, the player can engineer ideal hands through an editor, configure deal dynamics, or draw from Mike Lawrence's bundled Bridge Dealer, which specializes in nuanced tournament scenarios. Bidding mechanics are detailed, allowing players to experiment with strategies like cue bids, Jacoby transfers, and even a "gambling three-no-trump," while aggressiveness levels can be fine-tuned per team. The core gameplay offers visuals, swift card handling, and features like move suggestions and an undo function. Audio support adds shuffling and dealing sounds. For beginners, a "double dummy" mode lets the player view all hands in play, transforming practice into guided learning.

== Development ==
The game was developed by Presage Software, a company founded in 1986.

== Reception ==
Reception

Review score
| Publication | Score |
|---|---|
| PC Joker | 60% |

Computer Gaming World said "Despite the improved graphics and music, GSB2 should be considered an evolutionary rather than revolutionary product. It plays better than its predecessor, but still ignores the dummy and most attitude signals".

Compute! said "If you like bridge, you'll definitely want to get one of these games. Even if you prefer to play with real people, these games will help keep you in practice".
