= Grand Slam Bridge =

1986 video game

- Developer: Cybron
- Publisher: Electronic Arts
- Platform: IBM
- Release: September 1986
- Genre: Card game
- Modes: Single-player, multiplayer

Grand Slam Bridge is a 1986 video game developed by Cybron and distributed by Electronic Arts. A sequel, Grand Slam Bridge II, was released in 1992.

== Gameplay ==
Grand Slam Bridge offers a digital adaptation of the classic card game, designed for both seasoned players and those looking to refine their skills. The game replicates the feel of bridge with mechanics like pre-emptive bidding and weak jump overcalls, adhering closely to the rules of traditional play. Players can choose between contract bridge, duplicate bridge, or solitaire duplicate tournaments. The Practice Mode allows users to view all four hands face-up and experiment with bidding strategies, while the Options Mode caters to advanced players by enabling customization of bidding conventions and sequence settings. Whether playing solo or with up to three friends, the game accommodates any configuration by letting the computer fill in for missing players. Grand Slam Bridge includes a "Replay Hand" feature for trial-and-error learning and supports printing hands for offline review. The interface presents a top-down view of the table with North, South, East, and West positions, hidden cards, and a visible dummy. The game includes realistic card-shuffling and dealing sounds. While it does not teach bridge from scratch, the game assumes familiarity and encourages beginners to consult external primers.

== Development ==
A package compatible with Macintosh and Atari ST machines was in development at one point to be released in late 1986. Tim Cain was a programmer on the game.

== Reception ==
Computer Entertainer said "If you are a Bridge player and yearn to play the game when no one is around, or you'd like to learn the game without doing it in front of other people, this game is for you". Chicago Tribune called Grand Slam Bridge the best card game of 1986.
