= Atom RPG =

2018 video game

ATOM RPG
- Developer: Atom Team
- Platforms: Linux, macOS, Microsoft Windows, Android, iOS, Nintendo Switch, PlayStation 4, Xbox One/Series X/Series S.
- Release: December 19, 2018
- Genre: Role-playing video game

ATOM RPG is a post-apocalyptic role-playing video game, which takes place on the territory of the USSR in an alternative world after a nuclear war. The game was developed and published by the independent studio Atom Team. The game was released on December 19, 2018, through the online digital distribution services Steam and GOG.com, for the gaming platforms Microsoft Windows, macOS and Linux.

ATOM RPG is an indie game, made with Unity 5 engine and inspired by the classic, Fallout. The Fallout aesthetic is in many facets of ATOM RPG, it can see very similar choices in the interface, the color scheme, and the gameplay mechanics, but there are other influences, for example the sociocultural setting is characteristically based on the USSR.

The general idea and beginning started in 2008. In 2017, in a crowdfunding platform, Kickstarter, the game was successfully funded with more than $30,000. The game was created by the international Atom Team developers group. The developers involved in the creation of the game live in Latvia, Poland, Russia and Ukraine.

== Plot ==
It takes place in a post-apocalyptic post Soviet Union wasteland. In 1986 both the USSR and the Western Bloc were destroyed in mutual nuclear bombings. Nineteen years have passed and it's 2005. The protagonist is one of the survivors of the nuclear holocaust, an agent of ATOM. This remnant of a semi-legitimate military and scientific organization sent him out to explore in search of a special squad, which disappeared during the investigation of the mysterious bunker #317. The wastes are dangerous and filled with gangsters, mutants, stalkers, and other survivalists. There is a shadowy conspiracy, aimed at destroying all that is left of life on Earth.

Upon locating Bunker #317, the player learns of the experiments conducted inside the bunker that slowly led to the deaths of the scientists inside. Further inside, the player discovers the bodies of several ATOM agents from Morozov's squad. Evidence suggests that there was a mutiny, leading to violence breaking out. The only other clue is a strange pendant necklace that belongs to members of a local cult.

== Reception ==
Reception

Aggregate score
Aggregator	Score
Metacritic	PC: 70/100; NS: 65/100

The game has been met with mostly positive reception. On review aggregator Metacritic it a score of 70 out of 100 for the PC version, and 65 out of 100 the Nintendo Switch version.

== Expansion ==
ATOM RPG: Trudograd is a standalone expansion or sequel game from the same team, which continues the story of ATOM RPG. This expansion is confined to one city, Trudograd, two years after your adventures in the main game. It entered Steam Early Access in March 2020.

== See also ==
- Fallout series
