= Arcanum: Of Steamworks and Magick Obscura =

2001 video game

- Cover art by Glenn Fabry
- Developer: Troika Games
- Publisher: Sierra On-Line
- Designers: Jason D. Anderson; Leonard Boyarsky; Timothy Cain
- Writer: Edward R. G. Mortimer
- Composer: Ben Houge
- Platform: Microsoft Windows
- Release: NA: August 21, 2001; EU: August 24, 2001
- Genre: Role-playing
- Modes: Single-player, multiplayer

Arcanum: Of Steamworks and Magick Obscura is a 2001 role-playing video game developed by Troika Games and published by Sierra On-Line for Microsoft Windows. The game's story takes place within a fantasy setting currently undergoing a transformation from its own Industrial Revolution, in which magic competes against technological gadgets, and focuses on the efforts of a zeppelin crash survivor to find out who attacked the vessel, ultimately discovering a plot by an ancient power to return to the world and cause chaos. Rendered in an isometric perspective of an open world, the game offers players the opportunity to craft their protagonist with a variety of skills, including the option to be gifted in magic or use guns and gadgets to combat enemies, and complete quests in different ways.

The game proved a commercial success for Troika following its release, selling over 200,000 copies and generating revenue of over US$8.8 million, being deemed the fourth best-seller for video games within the period of its launch by NPD Intelect.

== Gameplay ==
Gameplay in Arcanum consists of traveling through the game world, visiting locations and interacting with the local inhabitants, typically in real-time. Occasionally, inhabitants will require the player's assistance in various tasks, which the player may choose to solve in order to acquire special items, experience points, or new followers. Many quests offer multiple solutions for the player, depending on their playing style, which may consist of combat, persuasion, thievery, or bribery. Ultimately, players will encounter hostile opponents (if such encounters are not avoided using stealth or diplomacy), in which case they and the player will engage in combat, which can be real-time or turn-based.

=== Combat ===
The player (dwarf, center) in combat with the character Virgil against an Ailing Wolf

Three combat modes were included in the final release of the game: real-time, turn-based, and a faster version of turn-based. Arcanum's combat design has received some levels of criticism, with reviews usually stating that it is poorly balanced and frantic. The player's combat capabilities are in large part governed by the character's combat skills and weapons. Attacking is performed automatically by clicking on a hostile non-player character (NPC) provided that they are in range of the attack.

Combat skills that the player character can choose from include melee weapons (with an optional back stabbing skill for stealth-oriented players), thrown weapons, archery, firearms, and a large variety of certain damage-inflicting spells from some schools of magic. Deciding whether or not to use violence in some parts of the game sometimes carries consequences for the player's party and its followers. Some artificial intelligence-controlled followers the player has in the party will find their character's conduct morally objectionable, causing the player to lose reputation with some of the followers who may leave or even attack the player.

=== Character creation ===
Arcanum begins with the player creating their character, choosing from a large and unique variety of races, attributes, technological skills, magical aptitudes, and background traits, or the player may choose a predefined character. Over the course of the game, the character may improve their skills by gaining experience through completing quests or defeating opponents in combat. Every time the player gains a level, they can spend one character point to improve any attribute, weapon skill, technological discipline, school of magic, thievery skill, or social skill. Every fifth level, one additional character point is awarded for a total of 64 character points. The player can only control one character directly but may recruit additional followers during the game depending on their aptitudes and alignment.

Player characters have the choice of specializing in a technological path which emphasizes constructing weapons, ammunition, and items from various components; a magical path which emphasizes spellcasting; or a neutral path, learning both magic and technology skills, which allows the most flexibility. The game uses a meter to show how biased towards magic or technology the player is; any character points spent on a technological discipline or skill move the aptitude meter towards the technology side and any points spent on spells move it towards the magical side. Character points spent on attributes or any other skills do not alter the aptitude meter. A high aptitude toward technology renders the character resistant or immune to magic (both harmful and beneficial) and also greatly decreases the character's ability to use magic effectively and limits the effectiveness of magical items. A high magical aptitude increases the effects of the character's magic and the power of magical items they equip, but technological items they equip will be subject to malfunctions, reflected in an increasingly higher chance of the character critically failing in combat, which can have devastating effects.

=== Modules ===
The game, similar to the later Neverwinter Nights series, features "modules"; the ability to create custom maps and missions using an editor included with the game. Already included with the game is Vormantown, and a number of official modules are also available.

== Synopsis ==
=== Setting ===
A screenshot from the game illustrating Arcanum's game world

Arcanum is the name of the fantasy world in which the game unfolds. It consists of a continental mainland and three islands. The world is inhabited by various races resembling those from the works of Tolkien, including humans, elves and half-elves, dwarves, gnomes, halflings, orcs, ogres, and various wildlife. Players can choose from humans, elves, dwarves, gnomes, halflings, and human hybrid races, including half-elves, half-orcs and half-ogres as playable races. The continent is divided between several different political entities. The Unified Kingdom is rapidly industrializing. Its two largest cities are Tarant and Ashbury, and it is the most technologically advanced kingdom. The Kingdom of Cumbria is a deteriorated kingdom, consisting of Dernholm and Black Root, and ruled by an old conservative king. The Kingdom of Arland, extending from Caladon to Roseborough, is a small but thriving monarchy west of the Stonewall range. The Glimmering Forest, the largest in Arcanum, is home to the elven city of Qintarra and the dark elven city of T'sen-Ang, and has been untouched by the technological advancements of the time. The Stonewall and Grey Mountain Ranges are home to the remaining dwarven clans: the Black Mountain Clan, the Stonecutter Clan, the Wheel Clan, and the Iron Clan. Many other minor settlements also exist, as well as containing ruins of past civilizations. The biggest of these is the ruins of Vendigroth, the most advanced city on Arcanum, which met a sudden and mysterious end.

An important in-game dynamic is the dichotomy of magic and technology in the world. Technology is explained to function by using physical law to produce a desired result, e.g., a bolt of electricity from a Tesla Gun would arc through the most conductive path to its target, with some plated armors being more prone to electrical damage than others. Magic, on the other hand, is explained to manipulate physical law to make a lightning spell follow the shortest path to the target, instead of the natural path. The two are incompatible to the point that they overwhelm each other. Technological devices will become ineffective or even permanently inoperative in the presence of powerful magic and vice versa. Much of the population has chosen to embrace technology for its efficiency, accessibility, and permanent results, while the majority of elves, dark elves, and some humans and half-elves continue to practice magic exclusively. This also affects interactions between different characters, as spells cast on technologists or firearms used against mages have a failure rate.

Orcs and ogres are looked down upon as savage, feral peoples by Arcanum's civilized folk, who own virtually all the industry of the major population centers. There is a great enmity between elves and dwarves, the former being naturally inclined towards magically defined society, the latter being forerunners of the technology race—and many elves blame the dwarves for the rise of human technology and concomitant waning of elvish political power. Scientists are unwelcome in magical societies like Qintarra or Tulla but will be respected if they are righteous and good folk. Conversely, a mage would be admitted onto a steam train only on the provision that he take a third-class seat on the last caboose, so as not to cause interference with the engine (despite there being no in-game mechanic by which even the powerful mages can affect it). Powerful mages may be denied transport altogether.

=== Plot ===
Arcanum begins with a cutscene of the IFS Zephyr, a luxury zeppelin, on her maiden voyage from Caladon to Tarant. Two monoplanes, piloted by Half-Ogre bandits, close in on the craft and commence attack runs, succeeding in shooting it down. An old gnome who is a passenger aboard the Zephyr is now in his death throes under charred debris and tells the player to bring a silver ring to "the boy", and promptly dies. Being the only survivor of the crash, the main character is proclaimed as "The Living One", a holy reincarnate, by the only witness to the crash, Virgil. The story follows the player's path as he or she searches for the origin of the ring. Over the course of the game, the player uncovers more about the history of the continent, the motivation of the assassins who are trying to kill him or her, and the identity of the one threatening to end all life in the land.

Arcanum is an example of a nonlinear role-playing game. At various points throughout the game, players may take the story in different directions, sometimes permanently removing different paths of action. The game's central quest ultimately develops according to how players navigate its dichotomies, the most apparent being that of magic and technology. Many of the game's side quests allow for more than one solution depending on the player character's specializations and certain portions of the main quest can be solved more easily through dialogue than through combat. The game's magic/technology and good/evil alignments also influence what followers a character can attract throughout the game or how other NPCs will react to the player.

The game is also notable for being possible to complete in everything from a completely pacifist to a completely violent way. The player can, technically, kill every person they meet and still complete the game, even the very first companion they meet at the start of the game – if the person was an important NPC with plot information to divulge, they will carry that information with them in the form of a journal or the like. Likewise, the player is technically able to avoid combat altogether from start to finish, and can defeat even the final boss of the game without using violence (although this requires certain conditions to be fulfilled to be possible to do). Most players will of course fall somewhere between these two extremes, but the possibility is unusual for a role-playing game and also something that remains popular with fans.

== Development ==
Arcanum's public beta testing commenced in September 2000. It is the debut title of now-defunct development house Troika Games, which consisted of former Interplay Entertainment staff—most notably Tim Cain—responsible for 1997's critically acclaimed Fallout. On release, the game was found to be incompatible with some video cards, such as Voodoo2, and drivers such as nVidia's Detonator3. Furthermore, the game's copy protection software, SecuROM, caused system-component conflicts with particular brands of sound cards and CD-ROM drives. Such bugs, as well as some gameplay bugs, were one of the game's biggest criticisms.

The latest official patch, 1.0.7.4 was released in October 2001. With the end of the official support, several unofficial patches were produced by the game community to fix the many remaining problems and bugs.

=== Design ===
Arcanum's large, free-form world bears many similarities to Fallout with regards to the scarcity of towns, cities, or other locations of interest; however Arcanum's map is much larger and more diverse than Fallout's. The travel system has some similarities with The Elder Scrolls in that the world can be traveled across in-game (where occasionally the player runs into enemy groups), without the use of the world map, and that the game doesn't rush the player into pursuing the main quest.

The game comes packaged with an editor, called WorldEdit, that allows players to create their own maps, campaigns, and NPCs. The program allows any game-world object to be input into existing and newly created environments via GUI menus. Editing can be done in either isometric or top-down views. Players have charge over the game's variables, such as the skill level required to pick a certain lock or the precise time that an electric light will turn on. Players are also able to create brand new objects via the scenery creator.

=== Sequel ===
In a 2000 interview with Nextgame.it, Tim Cain announced plans for an Arcanum sequel, but these plans would not come to pass—Troika Games filed for dissolution on September 30, 2005.

In September 2006, one of Arcanum's lead programmers and co-founder of Troika, Leonard Boyarsky, divulged that the studio had originally commenced work on a sequel, going by the working title of Journey to the Centre of Arcanum, which would use Valve's Source Engine. Development was curtailed by disputes between Sierra and Valve, resulting ultimately in the project being shelved.

In 2023, Cain said that the game took inspiration from Jules Verne's Journey to the Center of the Earth and it would have taken place underground. In the story, the player character would be hired by the wife of Franklin Payne to find her husband. Payne had gone on an underground expedition in search of an ancient civilization after building a drilling machine. During the game, the player would find a special ore that allows the creation of items capable of combining magic and technology without conflict.

=== Soundtrack ===
Composed by Ben Houge, Arcanum's soundtrack features an unusual instrumentation by avoiding the predominantly symphonic orchestration common to RPG soundtracks. Instead, it is scored almost entirely for string quartet. The compositions follow the conventional RPG soundtrack format: short, impressionistic vignettes which are looped in-game, with each area using different tunes, and alternative pieces for combat. The soundtrack was produced by Ben Houge and Jeff Pobst, with Leonid Keylin on first violin, Kathy Stern on second violin, Vincent Comer on viola, Susan Williams on cello, Evan Buehler on marimba, and Ben Houge on djembe, rainstick and synthesizer. The game's soundtrack has been well received, and was listed amongst the 12 best video-game soundtracks of all time by Forbes in 2012. The soundtrack was not commercially released but is available for free download.

== Reception ==
=== Sales ===
Writing for GameSpot, Desslock reported that Arcanum "sold very well" in the United States during its initial weeks, but "faded" from the charts afterward. The game entered NPD Intelect's computer game sales rankings at #4 for the week ending August 25. It fluctuated between positions four and five for another two weeks, before exiting the weekly charts in the September 9–15 period. Arcanum was the United States' 11th-best-selling computer game for the month of September, and totaled domestic sales of 69,522 units by the first week of November. According to Chart-Track, Arcanum was also September's 10th-highest computer game seller in the United Kingdom. Remarking upon its chart position, Anthony Holden of PC Zone wrote that it was "good to see that a relatively minor RPG with solid gameplay values can shift a few units".

Arcanum ultimately sold 234,000 copies and drew revenues of $8.8 million by February 2005. It was Troika Games' most commercially successful release by that date. The website GameDaily characterized its commercial performance as substandard, and as a contributing factor to the studio's closure in 2005.

=== Critical reviews ===
Reception

Aggregate scores
Aggregator	Score
GameRankings	78%
Metacritic	81/100

Review scores
Publication	Score
GameRevolution	B−
GameSpot	7.3/10
GameSpy	89/100
GameZone	90/100
IGN	8.7/10
Next Generation	4/5
PC Gamer (US)	90/100
RPGFan	86/100

Awards
Publication	Award
IGN	Editors' Choice
GameZone	Editors' Choice

Carla Hacker reviewed the game for Next Generation, rating it four stars out of five, and stated that "An in-depth and engaging role-playing game that deviates from the traditional fantasy setting."

Arcanum received "generally favorable" reviews from critics, according to the review aggregation website Metacritic.

The game received two Editor's Choice Awards from IGN and GameZone with scores of 8.7 out of 10 and 90 out of 100, respectively. IGN stated that "the story is rich and complex", praising the character creation, open-ended gameplay, and size of the game world. They also praised the game for its responsiveness to the player: "A well-adjusted Elf may get more information out of an aristocrat than a surly Half-Ogre, and the conversations you have will be completely different." IGN did, however, criticize its interface, calling it "[not] very intuitive, bordering on downright clunky" and the in-game user interface "takes up over a third of the screen". Gamezone called it an RPG with "some extra bite", also praising the character creation and gameplay, stating, "This one will be on your PC for months". Additionally, they praised the "incredible range of equipment that ranges from standard[s] such as swords and armor to rags and coal and empty cans".

The game also received praise from The Electric Playground, which awarded the game 9 out of 10 and calling it "the most diverse and open-ended RPG to date." Game Revolution praised the game, particularly the character creation, stating, "Whomever you are, the world treats you accordingly", but also criticized the graphics. Game Informer rated the game as 6.75 out of 10, GamePro gave it 4 out of 5 and Mygamer awarded the game 8 out of 10.

GameSpot gave the game a rating of 7.3 out of 10, calling it a "captivating and immersive role-playing experience" and praising the setting as a "great concept". Their review, however, was adverse on the claim of lackluster graphics, and unintuitive interface as the main criticisms: "There's nothing flattering about the dated, washed-out, low-resolution graphics".

The editors of Computer Games Magazine named Arcanum the best role-playing game of 2001—tied with Wizardry 8—and presented it with their "Best Writing" award. They called Arcanum a "phenomenally well-written" title with an "incredibly creative" setting. It also won PC Gamer US's, RPG Vault's, The Electric Playground's and IGN's 2001 "Role-Playing Game of the Year" prizes, and was nominated in GameSpy's "PC RPG Game of the Year" and GameSpot's "Best Single-Player Role-Playing Game" and "Best Story" categories. PC Gamer's editors wrote, "Arcanum greatly exceeded our expectations, optimizing everything we hold dear about roleplaying on the computer."
