= Leonard Boyarsky =

American computer games designer and visual artist

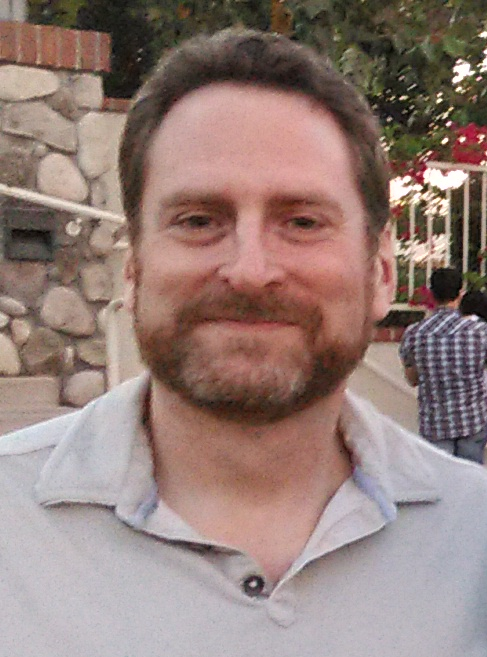
- Boyarsky in 2017
- Occupations: Video game designer, visual artist
- Employer: Obsidian Entertainment
- Notable work: Fallout, Arcanum: Of Steamworks and Magick Obscura, Vampire: The Masquerade – Bloodlines, Diablo III, The Outer Worlds

Leonard Boyarsky is an American computer game designer and visual artist. He is one of the key designers of the video games Fallout and Diablo III.

== Early life ==
After he earned a bachelor's degree in Illustration (at Cal State Fullerton) and a bachelor's degree in Fine Art (at Art Center College of Design), he worked as freelance artist for Interplay and Maxis in 1992.

He has cited Wizardry and Lands of Lore: The Throne of Chaos as being his favorite video games, albeit admittedly he was more into comic books when first entering the industry.

== Career ==
=== Interplay Entertainment (1992–1998) ===
Boyarsky joined Interplay Entertainment as employee number 88.

After some freelance work for Interplay (Rags to Riches: The Financial Market Simulation and Castles II: Siege and Conquest) he was hired as art director, lead artist and designer-writer.

His first work was as lead artist in 1995 was Stonekeep. He was in charge of the conceptualization and implementation of 2D and 3D sprites.

While at Interplay, Boyarsky met Tim Cain and Jason D. Anderson, the future co-founders of Troika Games. The three met after work hours to play Dungeons & Dragons and GURPS. Cain eventually sent an email around, proposing colleagues to meet after work hours over pizza to discuss making a video game based on an engine he had built. The five people who showed up, including Boyarsky and Anderson, would become the core team working on Fallout.

Boyarsky recalls suggesting the post-apocalyptic setting, as he and Anderson were both huge Mad Max 2 fans. Boyarsky was adamant about not making a fantasy game, due to the large number of fantasy RPGs in the market.

Two years later, in 1997, he finished his work as art director on Fallout, where he set the recognizable 1950s future graphics style, the humorous Vault Boy Traitcards and also the unusual ending. He also did some polishing on the dialogs for the game. Before leaving Interplay to form Troika Games with Cain and Anderson, he designed the overall gameplay refinements and main story arc, quests, areas, and characters for Fallout 2 in 1998.

=== Troika Games (1998–2005) ===
Boyarsky had different roles at Troika Games; among others he was project leader, art director, designer-writer and CEO.

On their first project, Arcanum: Of Steamworks and Magick Obscura, which was released 2001, he filled similar positions as in Fallout, doing the art direction, dialog writing-editing and story-quest design. He was the project leader and art director on Troika's last released game in late 2004, Vampire: The Masquerade - Bloodlines. He worked also on an untitled post-apocalyptic game which was never released due to financial trouble, though a demonstration video of the engine was later released for the public.

As Troika closed in early 2005, he took a year off due to burnout syndrome. He was later asked by Blizzard Entertainment to work on the story and RPG elements on Diablo III.

=== Blizzard Entertainment (2006–2016) ===
Boyarsky worked as lead world designer on Diablo III and its subsequent expansion Diablo III: Reaper of Souls at Blizzard Entertainment. His role included fleshing out the lore, dialogue and quests in the game. He found it important to build upon the story elements of the Diablo franchise, and convey its intricacies in a more compelling way.

This emphasis marked a shift for Blizzard, who had previously focused less on developing the story elements of the Diablo franchise. This shift was exemplified at 2011’s BlizzCon, where Chris Metzen chaired the first-ever lore panel, with Boyarsky as the main presenter.

Subsequently, Boyarsky would go on make several public appearances and became somewhat of a spokesperson for the lore and story aspects of Diablo III.

Boyarsky was affectionately known as ‘LeBo’ in the Diablo fan community. A legendary gem called ‘Boyarsky’s Chip’ can be found in Diablo III as an homage. Its item description contains a reference to Fallout.

=== Obsidian Entertainment (2016–present) ===
In April 2016, Boyarsky joined Obsidian Entertainment. Soon after, Feargus Urquhart has confirmed that Boyarsky and Tim Cain are working together on an unannounced project. Urquhart also stated that the duo were not working on then current Obsidian projects such as Tyranny, Pillars of Eternity or Armored Warfare. Boyarsky has described the project as his “dream game”.

During the 2018 Game Awards, Obsidian announced that the game Boyarsky and Cain have been working on is The Outer Worlds, a first-person science fiction action-RPG that takes place on a terraformed exoplanet. The game was released for Microsoft Windows, PlayStation 4, and Xbox One on October 25, 2019.

== Quotes ==
When later asked why he left Interplay, Boyarsky commented that :

Interplay had been a great place to work, and we felt that it was losing a lot of what we felt was great about it, and that they were making a lot of bad decisions that would destroy the company. We were about five or six years early on that, but we saw the writing on the wall. If Baldur's Gate hadn't hit big, Interplay might well have imploded much earlier, but we left about a year before BG was even released.

After the Fallout IP was bought by Bethesda he said (in 2004) :

To be perfectly honest, I was extremely disappointed that we did not get the chance to make the next Fallout game. This has nothing to do with Bethesda, it's just that we've always felt that Fallout was ours and it was just a technicality that Interplay happened to own it. It sort of felt as if our child had been sold to the highest bidder, and we had to just sit by and watch. Since I have absolutely no idea what their plans are, I can't comment on whether I think they're going in the right direction with it or not.

== Games ==
Title	Year	Role(s)
Castles II: Siege and Conquest	1992	Artwork
Unnatural Selection	1993	Assistant artist
Stonekeep	1995	Lead artist
Fallout	1997	Art director, original game design
Fallout 2	1998	Main story arc, quests, areas, characters
Arcanum: Of Steamworks and Magick Obscura	2001	CEO, project leader, art director, designer-writer
Vampire: The Masquerade – Bloodlines	2004	CEO, project leader, art director, designer-writer
Diablo III	2012	Senior world designer
Diablo III: Reaper of Souls	2014	Senior world designer
Wasteland 2	2014	Portrait art
The Outer Worlds	2019	Game director (with Tim Cain)
The Outer Worlds 2	2025	Game director (with Brandon Adler)
