= Troika Games =

American video game developer

- Type: Privately held
- Industry: Video games
- Founded: April 1, 1998
- Defunct: February 24, 2005
- Headquarters: Irvine, California, United States
- Key people: Tim Cain, Leonard Boyarsky and Jason Anderson
- Products: Arcanum: Of Steamworks and Magick Obscura, The Temple of Elemental Evil, Vampire: The Masquerade – Bloodlines
- Website: troikagames.com (archived)

Troika Games was an American video game developer co-founded by Jason Anderson, Tim Cain, and Leonard Boyarsky. The company was focused on role-playing video games between 1998 and 2005, best known for Arcanum: Of Steamworks and Magick Obscura and Vampire: The Masquerade – Bloodlines.

== History ==
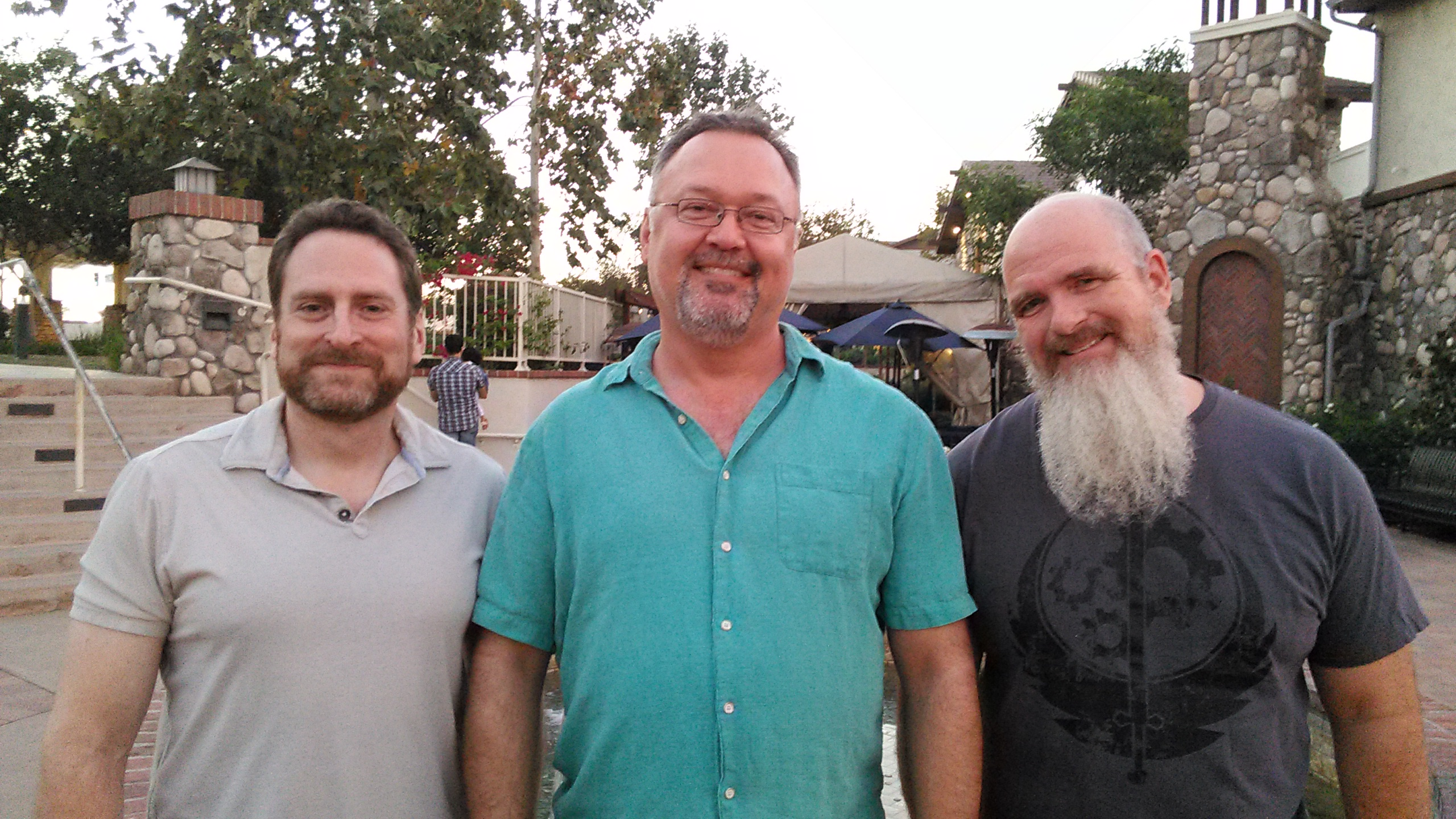
Troika founders Leonard Boyarsky, Tim Cain, and Jason Anderson in 2017

In 1997, Tim Cain, Leonard Boyarsky, and Jason Anderson worked on the Fallout sequel at Interplay. Finishing the initial design for Fallout 2, they were unable to come to an agreement with Interplay about the future team structure. They formed their new company, called Troika Games (a Russian word "Тройка" meaning "three of a kind") since they were the three key developers behind the critically acclaimed Fallout, on April 1, 1998. They initially planned to do games exclusively for one publisher (Sierra Entertainment), but a different company published each game. After being unable to secure funding for future projects, it laid off its staff in late 2004 and later closed its doors on February 24, 2005.

== Games ==
In 1998, Troika started designing a steampunk fantasy crossover role-playing video game named Arcanum: Of Steamworks and Magick Obscura and convinced Sierra Entertainment to publish it. The game was launched on August 21, 2001. While criticized for being unpolished and having poor combat, it received generally favorable reviews, averaging 81% on Metacritic. With 234,000 units sold, it is Troika's best-selling game. In 2016 it was released on Steam, where as of March 2017, it has over 200,000 owners.

After Arcanum was released in 2001, two teams started to work on two different games. One team created The Temple of Elemental Evil for publisher Atari which was released on September 26, 2003. It received praised for its implementation of the D&D 3.5 system, but received mixed reviews due to gameplay bugs and a lacking plot. With a 71% on Metacritic, it was the lowest-rated Troika game. It sold about 128,000 units.

Using an early version of the Source engine, the other team worked for Activision on Vampire: The Masquerade – Bloodlines. Development for that title finished in October 2004, and it released one month later. Critics praised Bloodlines' visuals, audio, and story but warned of bugs. It was rated 80% on Metacritic and sold merely 72,000 units on its original release. With the addition of the game to the digital distributors Direct2Drive and Steam in 2016, many units were sold digitally. As of March 2017, approximately 550,000 people own the game on Steam.

In 2004, Troika tried to find a publisher for an unnamed post-apocalyptic role-playing video game but was unsuccessful, leading to rumors in January 2005 that the company had already shut down. Screenshots of the unnamed game were posted in 2004 to the Fallout fan sites "No Mutants Allowed" and "Duck and Cover". A tech demo video was released in early 2005, weeks before closing. Tim Cain later confirmed that this was supposed to be a sequel to Fallout: "Leonard pursued Fallout 3, which ultimately went to Bethesda, who outbid us."

=== List of games ===
Year	Title	Publisher	Platform
2001	Arcanum: Of Steamworks and Magick Obscura	Sierra On-Line	Microsoft Windows
2003	The Temple of Elemental Evil	Atari	Microsoft Windows
2004	Vampire: The Masquerade – Bloodlines	Activision	Microsoft Windows
