= Stonekeep =

1995 video game

- Developer: Interplay Productions
- Publisher: Interplay Productions
- Director: Michael Quarles
- Producers: Michael Quarles; Brian Fargo
- Designers: Peter Oliphant; Christopher Taylor; Spencer Kipe
- Artists: Spencer Kipe; Leonard Boyarsky
- Writers: Peter Oliphant; Christopher Taylor; Scott La Rocca
- Composer: Brian Luzietti
- Platforms: MS-DOS, Windows
- Release: Windows 95: NA: 1995; MS-DOS: NA: November 8, 1995
- Genre: Role-playing
- Mode: Single-player

Stonekeep is a role-playing video game developed and released by Interplay Productions for the PC in 1995. It is a first-person dungeon crawler game with pre-rendered environments, digitized characters and live-action cinematic sequences. Repeatedly delayed, the game that was supposed to be finished in nine months took five years to make.

== Gameplay ==
Stonekeep is a first-person role-playing game in the style of Eye of the Beholder and Dungeon Master. The game is set in a series of underground labyrinths, filled with monsters, treasures and traps. The player uses the keyboard for movement and typing in notes in the journal, and the mouse to interact with objects and characters. The mouse pointer is usually a target indicator for aiming attacks and weapons wherever it is clicked. When the mouse pointer is moved onto a particular something it changes to another icon to indicate a different action. For example, the mouse pointer changes to an eye when the player can examine things (often signs), or a spread-out hand when the player can pick up items. Other tasks performed with the mouse pointers include opening and closing chests, opening and closing panels, pulling levers and switches, pressing buttons, drinking water, and giving items.

Fighting the Ice Queen

The protagonist Drake has two starting possessions: the magic scroll and the magic mirror. The magic scroll allows the player to pick up an infinite number of items. Items of the same type can be combined up to a maximum quantity of 99; other items can be combined such as a quiver which can hold 99 arrows. The magic mirror allows the player to equip Drake and other characters with weapons, armor, and accessories, and to consume items to affect their status, such as healing potions or bad smelling Throg food. Drake can also read scrolls used on him. Although Drake can wield any weapon, other characters like Farli and Karzak can only wield hammers, axes, and shields. Certain weapons like polearms and heavy swords require Drake to have two free hands to wield. Some armor can be worn by certain characters. For instance, only dwarves can wear dwarven platemail, and only Drake can wear knight armor. Exceptional characters like Sparkle and Wahooka cannot be outfitted, but can still consume items.

The third possession is the journal, which the player must procure. The journal is divided into six sections. The first section records the statistics of Drake, shows the status of his current equipped weapons, and describes the characteristics of his partners. Drake's statistics are strength, agility, and health, and his weaponry skills include polearm, sword, magick, missiles, and others. The second section of the journal records any clues and hints the player may come across. The third section is used for writing notes. The fourth section records items each time the player picks up a new type. The fifth section records runes each time the player comes across a new one. Unlike the items section, the runes do not have their own respective name recorded. The sixth section of the journal records the level maps that the players journeys through. Spots on the map can be clicked and notes referring to them can be written.

Stonekeep features an elaborate "magick" system where four types of runes are inscribed onto a spellcaster (wand): Mannish, Fae, Throggish, and Meta. The first three runes are used for offensive, defensive and special interaction purposes. The Meta runes enhance the effectiveness of the base runes—for example, double power multiplies a single firebolt in two. To use a spellcaster, it must contain adequate mana, and runes must be inscribed onto its shaft. To inscribe runes on the spellcaster, the player needs to equip the spellcaster on either one of Drake's hands, open the journal onto the Runes section, take out the spellcaster, and copy the runes onto the spell slots of the spellcaster. Then the runecaster can be taken out at any time and the spell that can be used has the spell slot highlighted and launched on the indicated target point. Using the magic mirror, some spells can be aimed at the characters, especially healing and quickness spells.

== Plot ==
Stonekeep's mythology revolves around a variety of gods associated with planets of the Solar System. In order, they are Helion (Mercury), Aquila (Venus), Thera (Earth), Azrael (Mars), Marif (Jupiter), Afri (Saturn), Saffrini (Uranus), Yoth-Soggoth (Neptune) the Master of Magick, and Kor-Soggoth (Pluto) the Brother to Magick. These gods were captured and imprisoned in nine orbs by the dark god Khull-Khuum 1000 years before the events of the game, during a cataclysm referred to as "The Devastation".

Stonekeep is centered on a hero, Drake. Ten years before the events of the game, Drake's home, the castle of Stonekeep, was destroyed by the insane god Khull-Khuum, the Shadowking. Drake, at this time just a boy, was saved from the castle by a mysterious figure. Returning to the ruins of Stonekeep, Drake is visited by the goddess Thera, who sends his spirit out of his body into the ruins itself to explore, find the mystical orbs containing the other gods, and reclaim the land.

Along the way, Drake makes many friends, including Farli, Karzak, and Dombur the dwarves; the great dragon Vermatrix; the elf Enigma; and the mysterious Wahooka, the King of goblins. Together, they embark on a quest of ridding the world of Khull-Khuum and his consort the Ice Queen.

== Development ==
=== Budget and technology ===
The earliest development of Stonekeep dated back in October 1988, discussed between Brian Fargo and Todd Camasta with the simple title "Dungeon Game". Producer Peter Oliphant and lead programmer Michael Quarles joined the company in 1990 and 1991, respectively. The game development was planned for a minimum period of nine months and a minimum budget of $50,000. However, because the initial stages of the game looked good, it exceeded nine months, lasting a total of five years. Stonekeep's final cost was $5 million; its production crew had grown to 200 members by the time of the game's release. The intro sequence was the most expensive part of the production, costing nearly half a million dollars to produce, which was ten times more than the initial budget for the entire project.

The initial story line was written by Oliphant, who also designed and programmed the graphics and artificial intelligence engine for the game. The project started out being called Brian's Dungeon (named after Brian Fargo, the president of Interplay Entertainment at the time). Fargo came up with the final name, Stonekeep.

The production took much longer than expected because of the rapid advancement of personal computer hardware at the time; specifically, PC CPUs advancing from 80386, to 80486, to Pentiums in the years the game was being developed. Oliphant, who originally designed the game and was lead programmer, left the game as the project passed its fourth year in development. He felt his continued presence was resulting in the constant addition of feature creep and changes (he was a contractor, and had initially only signed up for a nine-month project). After he left, the design became finalized and the product was shipped one year later. Quarles, who was an Interplay employee, stayed as the game's producer and saw it through to the end.

The initial specification for the game included that it could not require a hard drive or a mouse, run on an 80286 CPU, use 640K, and run off floppy disks. At the project's end, the game had been upgraded to requiring a mouse, a hard drive, a 386 CPU, and ran off CD-ROM. As a result, the engine had to be extensively modified throughout the production.

About three years into the project, Oliphant suggested to Fargo that the product be delivered on CD-ROM. Fargo rejected this idea at the time, citing the failure of previous Interplay CD-ROM projects that had gone this route. Oliphant suggested this after Fargo requested him to drop his percentage of royalties by half due to the high cost of production and goods to create the product, as it was at that time to be shipped on eight floppy disks. The cost of one CD was about the cost of one floppy disk, and the possibilities for eight floppy disks having problems is much greater than a single CD, so the solution seemed obvious to Oliphant. And, in fact, six months later Fargo changed his mind and agreed.

=== Graphics and audio ===
The 3D rendering was accomplished by using the Strata Vision application to create the room layouts, monsters, and objects. The initial motions of the monsters in the game were captured by using a blue screen outside with the sunlight. This resulted in uneven lighting from take to take, so eventually all that work was scrapped. Later, a professional studio with controlled lighting was used.

The earliest film footage was taken with a standard film camera and Macintosh computer for editing. This technology proved to be inadequate. After two years of failed filming, the team turned their attention to Hollywood. Aided by the production company Dia Quest and new digitizing technology, successful filming was finally implemented into the project. The entire five months of successful filming was soon met with several setbacks including toning, lighting, and digitization problems. When the team finally obtained the Betacam technology, the development was back on track.

According to Oliphant, when the project was taken over by Quarles, two questionable decisions were made. The game was always designed to be grid-based, where the player moved from grid to grid (in contrast to today's full freedom of motion 3D environments). Oliphant wanted the movement from center of grid to center of grid, but Quarles changed this to edge of grid to edge of grid. This resulted in the problem that turning within a grid moved the player to the other side of the grid. Much of the long production was a result of correcting this lack of symmetry. The other questionable decision was to not include Oliphant in the production of the motion graphics (Oliphant had an extensive Hollywood background before becoming a game developer). One consequence was that the original combat graphics had been captured from the waist up only, as Quarles had reasoned one must be close to a monster to fight it. Peter Oliphant, upon being delivered these graphics and seeing them for the first time, pointed out that the player could back away during a fight, which would result in seeing their legs. The legs therefore had to be drawn in by hand frame-by-frame to fix this, until these graphics were scrapped for a professional green-screen treatment used later on. The original skeleton in the game was an actual skeleton being worn by one of the artists, and was filmed against a green screen. Because of this, there were no images or animations of the skeleton walking away from the player during game play. A few months before the game's release the skeleton was replaced with the 3D model which was used on the packaging.

Due to the complexity of the graphics, during play the computer would have to constantly load graphics from the CD. This prohibited the use of the CD for music, so the developers used chip music for the soundtrack. The game features the voice of Arthur Burghardt—well known as the character Destro in the 1985 G.I. Joe cartoon series—in the role of Khull-Khuum.

== Release ==
Stonekeep was originally released for MS-DOS and Windows 95 in 1995, packaged in an elaborate gravestone-style illustrated box, and came with a white hardback novella Thera Awakening, coauthored by Steve Jackson and David L. Pulver (all rights of the novel went to Interplay). The CD-ROM also included a file called "muffins.txt" which contained a recipe for "Tim Cain's Chocolate Chip Pumpkin Muffins". Years later, Stonekeep was later made available for purchase through GOG.com's digital distribution system for Windows XP and Windows Vista.

== Reception ==
=== Sales ===
In preparation for Stonekeep's launch, Interplay shipped 175,000 units to retailers. This was the company's biggest shipment ever, according to Greg Miller of the Los Angeles Times. Interplay dedicated $1.5 million to the game's marketing budget, also the largest for any of its games by that point. In response to public reception of Stonekeep's pre-release demo, the company "stepped up the initial release forecast to 200,000 units". In the days before Stonekeep's release, Next Generation reported: "With store orders already topping 90,000, Interplay says it's set to become the fastest selling game in the company's twelve-year history." Upon its release, the game placed fourth on PC Data's monthly computer game sales chart for November 1995, but was absent on the following month's chart. According to Interplay, its global sales surpassed 300,000 copies by June 1998. Author Erik Bethke later described Stonekeep's commercial performance as "weak", which he blamed on its five-year development cycle.

=== Reviews ===
Reception

Review scores
Publication	Score
Computer Gaming World	4/5
GameSpot	6.6/10
Next Generation	5/5
PC Gamer (US)	77%
PC Zone	76 out of 100
Arcane	7/10
Maximum	3/5
Fusion	4.5/5
PC Games	A

A Next Generation critic deemed it "well worth the wait. The graphics are stunning, the music is eerie, and the interface is a pleasure to use." He made particular note of the automap, strong puzzle element and original visual designs for the monsters. Maximum praised the game's "atmospheric 3D rendered world" and sound effects, but criticized the lack of challenging puzzles, low amount of gore and "sluggish" combat. The editors of Computer Games Strategy Plus named Stonekeep the best computer role-playing game of 1995.

Petra Schlunk of Computer Gaming World called Stonekeep "successful on many levels; both hard-core and newcomers to role-playing should enjoy this." She wrote that "a lot of thought and heart went into the game's design and production", and she singled out its writing, characters and storyline for praise. The game was later nominated for Computer Gaming World's 1995 Role-Playing Game of the Year award. The editors praised it as "a milestone in computer role-playing games", with "beautiful SGI rendered characters and fascinating story development", but noted that it was held back by bugs. It won the magazine's readers' choice award in its genre.

PC Gamer US's Mike Wolf called it "a decent offering for roleplaying novices [... but] far from the magnum opus you'd expect". A review by Bernard Yee of GameSpot did not offer similar praises, concluding that "Stonekeep is a dated first-person RPG that suffers from a poor interface, little depth, and few frills." In Fusion, Arnie Katz called Stonekeep "a good antidote to the idiosyncratic complexities that pass for depth" among role-playing games, and praised its interface and audiovisual presentation. He summarized it as "an exciting quest that doesn't concede much to rival RPG releases." Paul Presley of PC Zone called Stonekeep "a case of gloss but no substance", which failed to offer "something over and above that which Eye of the Beholder was delivering all that time ago."

Andy Butcher reviewed Stonekeep for Arcane, commenting, "Although the 'plot' as such is somewhat weak, and the game quickly falls into an 'explore the level, kill the monsters, solve the puzzles' affair, Stonekeep is engaging and surprisingly addictive."

In 1996, editors of Computer Gaming World ranked it as the tenth top vaporware title in computer game history (due 1991, delivered 1996), stating that "after seeing the same basic demo for years, the game finally shipped, as an anti-climax." Stonekeep was also ranked at number six on GameSpot's top ten vaporware hall of shame. In 2009, GamesRadar also included Stonekeep among the games "with untapped franchise potential", due to the cancellation of Stonekeep 2: Godmaker. In 1996, GamesMaster ranked Stonekeep 56th on their "Top 100 Games of All Time."

== Legacy ==
The Oath of Stonekeep, a novel set in the world of Stonekeep, was written by Troy Denning and published 1999 by Berkley Boulevard Books. Interplay's Black Isle Studios worked on a sequel, Stonekeep 2: Godmaker, for roughly five years, before cancelling it in 2001 in order to work on Icewind Dale II and Baldur's Gate III: The Black Hound.

The game and its novelization would remain the only entry in its series until the 2010 announcement of Stonekeep: Bones of the Ancestors, a game developed for Interplay by Alpine Studios. It is not a sequel to Stonekeep, but rather an all-new game and a standalone entry in the franchise. Bones of the Ancestors was released in 2012 as downloadable content at WiiWare.
