= Tim Cain =

American video game developer

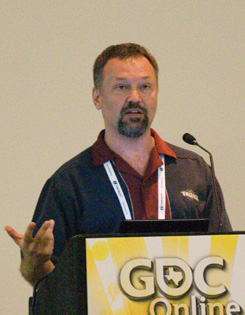
- Cain on the GDC Online 2010
- Born: Timothy Cain; August 25, 1965 (age 61)
- Education: University of Virginia (BSc); University of California, Irvine (MSc)
- Occupations: Programmer, designer, producer
- Employer: Obsidian Entertainment
- Known for: Creator of Fallout series
- Spouse: Robert Land (m. 2011)

YouTube information
- Channel: @CainOnGames
- Years active: 2011–present
- Subscribers: 221k
- Last updated: October 20, 2026

Timothy Cain (born August 25, 1965) is an American video game developer best known as the creator, producer, lead programmer and one of the main designers of the 1997 video game Fallout. In 2009, he was chosen by IGN as one of the top 100 game creators of all time.

== Early life, family and education ==
Cain was born on August 25, 1965, and was raised in a suburb of Alexandria, Virginia. His mother had worked for a local branch of the Judge Advocate General's Corps, and around 1979, his mother brought him along by invitation to get together with several high-ranking officers from the U.S. Navy to play Advanced Dungeons & Dragons. Cain loved the game after that and played it as a hobby with friends throughout his early years. He attended the University of Virginia, and in 1989 received a master's degree in computer science at University of California, Irvine. He continued following tabletop role playing games in college, using both the Dungeons & Dragons system as well as GURPS.

== Career ==
=== Early work ===
During his time in college, he helped a friend program a card game, Grand Slam Bridge, for CYBRON Corporation which was released in 1986.

=== Interplay Entertainment ===
Cain began working at Interplay Entertainment in 1991. Cain claimed that his voracious knowledge of Dungeons & Dragons helped secure the job, at one point asked if he knew what the term "THAC0" (to hit armor class 0) meant. The first game released with his involvement was The Bard's Tale Construction Set (1991) where he served as one of the game's programmers. He was also a programming consultant on Stonekeep (1995) and helped with coding for Star Trek: Starfleet Academy (1997).

==== Fallout and Fallout 2 ====
In early 1994, he began work on an isometric game engine which would eventually develop into the post-apocalyptic role-playing video game Fallout. Fallout's role-play system was built out from GURPS, which Cain had been running sessions with other Interplay employees after his arrival. For the first six months, he was the only employee on the project. He eventually took over the producer role from Thomas R. Decker who had to supervise multiple other projects at the time. Fallout was released in 1997 after three and half years of development to critical acclaim.

He was placed on the team for the sequel, Fallout 2, over his objections, wanting instead to work on a project unrelated to Fallout. Cain later explained in May 2023 that he left Fallout 2 months into development due to burnout and the cut in his bonus pay for Fallout by executive producer Brian Fargo as punishment for not revealing who was behind a game-delaying buffer overflow crash bug. Colleagues Jason D. Anderson and Leonard Boyarsky resigned along with him. In an interview, he criticized the bigger influence from sales/marketing department during Fallout 2 development, saying, "We were losing part of the game to a larger group who had bigger plans for it."

=== Troika Games ===
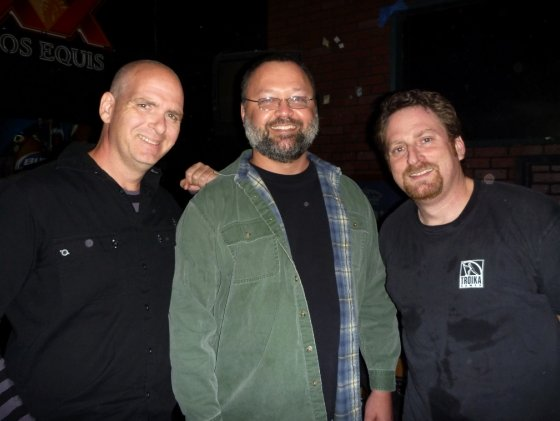
Tim Cain (middle) with the two other co-founders of Troika Games, Jason Anderson (left) and Leonard Boyarsky (right)

Cain co-founded Troika Games in 1998 with former Fallout colleagues Jason Anderson and Leonard Boyarsky.

That same year, Cain, Anderson, and Boyarsky began co-designing Troika’s first game, Arcanum: Of Steamworks and Magick Obscura. Cain also served as both project lead and lead programmer. Arcanum was a commercial success upon its 2001 release, and was the fourth best-selling video game at its debut according to NPD Intelect.

His next game reunited him with Thomas R. Decker, the original Fallout producer. As project leader and lead designer he produced within 20 months the Dungeons & Dragons game The Temple of Elemental Evil for publisher Atari in 2003. While he enjoyed the development process, Cain was ultimately disappointed in the resulting game.

After Bethesda Game Studios secured the Fallout license from Interplay Entertainment in 2004, Cain expressed disappointment.

I was hoping that Troika would get the license, but we were massively outbid. But in the end, they made a good game.

Cain had mixed reactions to Fallout 3, praising Bethesda's understanding of Fallout lore as well as the adaptation of "S.P.E.C.I.A.L." system into a first-person shooter role-playing video game (FPS-RPG), while criticizing the humor and reuse of story elements from earlier Fallout games.

He assisted in programming the last Troika game, Vampire: The Masquerade – Bloodlines, a horror RPG for Activision in 2004. He also worked on a post-apocalyptic roleplay game for which he could not convince any publisher to fund. As consequence he had to lay off most employees in late 2004 and shuttered Troika Games in February 2005.

=== Carbine Studios ===
Cain joined Carbine Studios when it was formed in 2005 as its programming director working on a fantasy MMO game for NCSoft. He was promoted to design director October 7, 2008. Cain left Carbine Studios in July 2011.

=== Obsidian Entertainment ===
In 2011, Tim Cain joined Obsidian Entertainment as senior programmer. He worked on Pillars of Eternity, which was funded through Kickstarter. He was also a co-director for The Outer Worlds. As of June 2020, Cain was no longer a full time employee of Obsidian, but still collaborated on The Outer Worlds 2, as well as for two other companies on a contract basis. On December 5, 2025, Tim announced on his YouTube channel that he had moved back to Southern California and returned to full time, in person employment with Obsidian.

=== Youtube channel ===
Cain created a YouTube channel in 2011. He began regularly uploading videos in 2023 in which he discusses topics such as the video game industry, video game development, business management, and his experiences with different companies and projects, as well as occasional personal stories. As of October 2026, the channel has released 792 videos and has 221k subscribers.

I have an ulterior motive which I've revealed after months of doing Youtube. I want people watching my channel to learn how to make games, and then make games for me to play[…] because I'm explaining games how I like them made, so if a few people start making those kinds of games, it's win-win!

== Personal life ==
Cain came out as a gay man in the early 2000s after concealing his sexuality throughout much of his early career. He married his husband Robert Land on July 14, 2011. He resided in the Seattle metropolitan area between 2020 and 2025, after previously living in the Los Angeles area for most of his career, and returned to Irvine located in Southern California in 2025.

Cain is affected by hereditary color blindness, stating in a Gamasutra interview that he "[can now] see less than half the spectrum of colors." He enjoys cooking, particularly Japanese and Chinese cuisine, and his favorite dishes are garlic chicken fried rice and chicken karaage. He considers himself a chocolate connoisseur, collecting chocolate wrappers and blogging about the chocolates he eats.

== Games ==
Year	Title	Role(s)
1986	Grand Slam Bridge	Programmer
1991	The Bard's Tale Construction Set	Designer, programmer
1993	Rags to Riches: The Financial Market Simulation	Programmer, additional design
1995	Stonekeep	Programming consultant
1997	Star Trek: Starfleet Academy	Programmer
1997	Fallout	Creator, producer, designer, lead programmer
1998	Fallout 2	Designer, additional programming
2001	Arcanum: Of Steamworks and Magick Obscura	Project lead, lead programmer
2003	The Temple of Elemental Evil	Project lead, lead designer
2004	Vampire: The Masquerade – Bloodlines	Programmer
2014	South Park: The Stick of Truth	Programmer
2014	WildStar	Design Director, Programming Director
2015	Pillars of Eternity	Programmer, additional design
2016	Tyranny	Programmer
2019	The Outer Worlds	Director
2025	The Outer Worlds 2	Creative consultant
