= The Strip (Fallout) =

- Fallout episode
- Episode no.: Season 2 Episode 8
- Directed by: Frederick E. O. Toye
- Written by: Karey Dornetto
- Cinematography by: David Franco
- Editing by: Ali Comperchio; Andrew Groves; Yoni Reiss
- Original air date: February 3, 2026
- Running time: 56 minutes

Guest appearances
- Johnny Pemberton as Thaddeus; Michael Cristofer as Elder Cleric Quintus; Macaulay Culkin as Lacerta Legate; Martha Kelly as Representative Diane Welch; Annabel O'Hagan as Stephanie Harper; Dave Register as Chet; Barbara Eve Harris as Rodriguez; Xelia Mendes-Jones as Dane; Bashir Salahuddin as Joseph; Edwin Lee Gibson as Shotgun Jeff; Clancy Brown as U.S. President; Rachel Marsh as Claudia; Adam Faison as Ronnie McCurtry; Jeremy Levick as Pete; Shinelle Azoroh as Julia; Justin Theroux as Robert House

Episode chronology
← Previous "The Handoff"	Next → —
- Fallout season 2

"The Strip" is the eighth and final episode of the second season of the American post-apocalyptic drama television series Fallout. It is the sixteenth overall episode of the series and was written by co-executive producer Karey Dornetto, and directed by executive producer Frederick E. O. Toye. It was released on Amazon Prime Video on February 3, 2026.

The series depicts the aftermath of an apocalyptic nuclear exchange in an alternate history of Earth where advances in nuclear technology after World War II led to the emergence of a retrofuturistic society and a subsequent resource war. The survivors took refuge in fallout shelters known as Vaults, built to preserve humanity in the event of nuclear annihilation. In the episode, Lucy tries to stop her father's plans, while the Ghoul learns the truth about his family's status.

The episode received mostly positive reviews from critics, who praised the performances, production values, closure to storylines, and set-up for the third season.

== Plot ==
In 2077, Cooper Howard and Barb are approached by Hank and Steph, who reveal they are engaged, much to their shock. Cooper is then called by House, who states he is not to blame for the incoming events. Suddenly, Howard is arrested, taking the blame for Barb for handing the relic to the President, secretly tied to the Enclave.

In 2296, Lacerta Legate finds a note from the prior Caesar, proclaiming that the Legion ends with himself. He seizes this as an opportunity to name himself Caesar, and tells the Legion that he intends to take over New Vegas.

The Vault-Tec executives, led by Ronnie, attack Norm and try to bring him to trial, but the group are attacked by radroaches, and the executives flee into an adjacent room, leaving Norm behind. However, the radroaches break into their room and massacre the executives, accidentally sparing Norm. Norm returns and rescues the wounded Claudia, dragging her away on a stretcher.

In Vault 32, the enraged mob attempt to break down the door to where Steph is hiding. Chet enthusiastically joins in until he realizes they are chanting the same things the raiders wrote when murdering the original Vault 32 residents. Steph activates a Pip-Boy from Hank's box, identifying herself as Hank's wife, and contacts the Enclave to begin Phase 2.

In New Vegas, House tells the Ghoul that he should act reasonably in his quest for his family, and offers to guide him if he willingly puts a Pip-Boy on his wrist. Maximus continues fighting the Deathclaw, and is forced to try it without armor, earning him respect among the Freeside citizens. While Thaddeus tries to help him, the NCR help kill the Deathclaw.

At the Vault-Tec facility, Lucy confronts the head of Diane Welch, who asks her to kill her. She mercifully complies, but is captured again by Hank. Before he can brainwash her, the Ghoul shoots him. Lucy implants a control chip in Hank, who admits his Enclave ties before activating it himself and losing his memory.

Arriving at a Vault-Tec section, the Ghoul finds cryo-pods with his family names, but without any bodies. He finds a Colorado postcard, and decides to journey there, despite House's protests, dropping his Pip-Boy in the process. As Lucy and Maximus reunite and explore the Lucky 38, the Legion marches towards New Vegas.

In a post-credits scene, the Brotherhood of Steel recovers from its losses. Dane visits Quintus, providing him with the Liberty Prime blueprints.

== Production ==
=== Development ===
The episode was written by co-executive producer Karey Dornetto, and directed by executive producer Frederick E. O. Toye. It was Dornetto's second writing credit and Toye's fifth directing credit.

=== Writing ===
Co-showrunner Geneva Robertson-Dworet explained that finale wanted to show the importance of New Vegas in the narrative, "New Vegas has always been one of the flowers of civilization in the Fallout world, obviously, because House's missiles largely protected it from the worst of the bombs and allowed it to be a relatively undestroyed city in the Wasteland, which was an incredibly rare thing. So it is really a crown jewel and many factions want it accordingly. So we were excited to leave the Legion, the NCR and Robert House — which in the New Vegas game are three of the major factions — warring for territory in that area once again. War never changes." Executive producer Jonathan Nolan teased, "It's not really about the end of a world; it's about the beginning of a new one."

Regarding Hank's plans, executive producer Jonathan Nolan said, ""[Hank] set a plan in motion. His commitment is so extreme that he's willing to unplug himself. That way, [Lucy] will have no way to figure out what he's done. I just thought that was a delicious idea. This is where the show is at its best, when you know you have this massive scale but you also have these very intimate relationships. This is ultimately about a father and a daughter arguing. It's science fiction, but it plays on a very real tension of trying to turn people you love into people they're not."

On Hank's decision to erase his memory, Kyle MacLachlan added, "He's trying to be the best he can be as a father. He did a wonderful job raising her up, preparing her for the ordeal that she had to go through. At the end of Season 1, he felt like, wow, she made it through the Wasteland. So that decision was one of sacrifice. He'd already set his plan in motion, so his job was done in a way." MacLachlan also admitted surprise by the episode's plot twist, revealing that he married Steph in flashback sequences.

=== Music ===
The episode featured many songs, including "It's a Good Day" by Perry Como, "I've Got You Under My Skin" by Frank Sinatra, and "This Is Worth Fighting For" by The Ink Spots.

== Critical reception ==
"The Strip" received mostly positive reviews from critics. Matt Purslow of IGN gave the episode a "great" 8 out 10 rating and wrote in his verdict, "With a number of storylines left without any significant sense of closure, the concluding episode of Fallout Season 2 does feel more like a midpoint than a finale. But while it's unable to make this collection of eight episodes feel like a complete arc, it does connect all the pieces together and provide answers to many of this season's most pressing questions. Its greatest achievement, though, is hitting well-earned emotional milestones for its central characters – be they bittersweet goodbyes, renewed hopes, or simply being the bravest kid in a missile-firing suit of armour."

William Hughes of The A.V. Club gave the episode a "C–" grade and wrote, "The series' first season made it clear that this show could be about more than just playing the hits of a popular video game's TV Tropes page, that it had something meaningful and cohesive to say about the ways the world dies. Season two demonstrates how it can also, frequently, be less than that: a collection of good scenes held together by strong performances and not much else, riffing on ideas without ever building anything fundamentally solid. The finale sits firmly at that lazy heart: At nearly every turn, when given the chance to say something, it instead simply feints, listlessly gesturing at a cool idea it can tell you about in the future. Fallout does a fine job, even at its worst, of presenting a vivid portrait of the Wasteland. Rarely has it ever felt like more of a waste."

Jack King of Vulture gave the episode a perfect 5 star rating out of 5 and wrote, "On balance, this was probably my favorite episode of Fallout to date: It's emotional, it's cathartic, it's satisfying, it's sad, it's triumphant. For one, I'm glad that Maximus was finally given some time to really shine — Moten puts in some of his work yet in the finale — while doing battle with the deathclaws in Freeside." Chris Gallardo of Telltale TV gave the episode a 4 star rating out of 5 and wrote, "Fallout Season 2 Episode 8 will leave fans with a bittersweet aftertaste as it opens new doors for Lucy, Maximus, and the Ghoul while laying the groundwork for an impactful Season 3. Even though Season 2, since Episode 6, has pretty much been setup to next season's story, it's a satisfying cliffhanger for the most part."

Ross Bonaime of Collider gave the episode a 8 out of 10 and wrote, ""The Strip" is a fantastic conclusion to a pretty great sophomore season. More than any other episode in this installment, "The Strip" is excellent at weaving together multiple stories, popping back and forth between characters and timelines to create the most captivating hour of the series so far. It also offers a wonderful evolution for all the main characters that makes them feel like they're finally discovering who they need to be to survive within the Wasteland while setting up an entirely new location for Season 3." Alexandria Ingham of TV Fanatic gave the episode a perfect 5 star rating out of 5 and wrote, "We've come to the end of another season of Fallout, and just like with the first season, there are far more questions. The Fallout Season 2 finale did deliver some answers, though, setting up for an intriguing and exciting next season."

Sean T. Collins of Decider wrote, "there's an air of anticlimax to Fallout's Season 2 finale. There were just a few too many payoffs deferred, a few too many secrets held back, a few too many storylines stretched thin. Don't get me wrong, everything here was good, but there's the nagging sense that the show decided to stop just short of being great." Greg Wheeler of The Review Geek gave the episode a 3.5 star rating out of 5 and wrote, "So Fallout wraps up its second season... by not really wrapping anything up. Everything that's here is basically teased toward a third season, although we do get a conclusive ending for Hank and an explanation over what's inside his box."
