= The Demon in the Snow (Fallout) =

- Fallout episode
- Episode no.: Season 2 Episode 4
- Directed by: Stephen Williams
- Written by: Jane Espenson
- Cinematography by: David Franco
- Editing by: Ali Comperchio
- Original air date: January 7, 2026
- Running time: 49 minutes

Guest appearances
- Johnny Pemberton as Thaddeus; Michael Cristofer as Elder Cleric Quintus; Leslie Uggams as Betty Pearson; Annabel O'Hagan as Stephanie Harper; Xelia Mendes-Jones as Dane; Dave Register as Chet; Rodrigo Luzzi as Reg McPhee; Barbara Eve Harris as Rodriguez; Zach Cherry as Woody Thomas; Dallas Goldtooth as Charles Whiteknife; Jon Gries as Biff; Brian Thompson as Coronado Elder; Sisa Grey as Yosemite Elder; Chris Browning as Grand Canyon Elder; Rachel Marsh as Claudia; Adam Faison as Ronnie McCurtry; Rajat Suresh as Clark; Jeremy Levick as Pete; Ciel Shi as Wenjie

Episode chronology
← Previous "The Profligate"	Next → "The Wrangler"
- Fallout season 2

"The Demon in the Snow" is the fourth episode of the second season of the American post-apocalyptic drama television series Fallout. It is the twelfth overall episode of the series and was written by consulting producer Jane Espenson, and directed by Stephen Williams. It was released on Amazon Prime Video on January 7, 2026.

The series depicts the aftermath of an apocalyptic nuclear exchange in an alternate history of Earth where advances in nuclear technology after World War II led to the emergence of a retrofuturistic society and a subsequent resource war. The survivors took refuge in fallout shelters known as Vaults, built to preserve humanity in the event of nuclear annihilation. In the episode, Deathclaws are introduced, Lucy and the Ghoul reach New Vegas, while the Brotherhood of Steel turn against one another.

The episode received highly positive reviews from critics, who praised the episode's comedic elements and production values, particularly the design of New Vegas.

== Plot ==
During the Sino-American War, a power-armored Cooper Howard is ambushed and immobilised by Chinese soldiers in Alaska. They taunt him, before they are killed by a Deathclaw. The Deathclaw confronts Howard before it is lured away by gunfire, leaving him be.

In 2296, Norm grows suspicious of a Vault-Tec executive who seems to know more than he reveals. In Vault 33, a broken water chip causes severe shortages, leading Betty to consult Steph; they discover Vault 31 is empty and thus the experiment effectively over, but Steph withholds help unless she receives Hank's keepsake box stored in Vault 33. Woody overhears and reports the conversation to Steph, who is dismissive, while Chet learns Steph has a pre-war Canadian ID.

Still shaken after killing Xander, Maximus convinces Thaddeus to take on Xander's power-armor to impersonate him, as Xander's death would likely provoke a civil war. Upon returning to Area 51, Dane immediately deduces that Xander died, with Maximus confiding that he plans to seize the opportunity to kill Quintus. Maximus confronts Quintus at gunpoint, but is unable to bring himself to shoot. He confesses to killing Xander, and Quintus tries to kill him after Maximus reveals that he did so to save ghoul children. Chaos erupts after Dane steals the cold fusion relic, as the Brotherhood chapters attack one another, each believing the others are responsible. Maximus and Thaddeus flee with the relic into the desert.

Lucy recovers at a New California Republic camp and is provided with weapons by the Rangers there. The Ghoul and Lucy continue towards New Vegas, although she has become addicted to drugs used during her recovery. The Ghoul provides her with more drugs, which causes her to gleefully kill feral ghouls at the New Vegas Strip gate. Lucy and the Ghoul enter the New Vegas Strip, which they find abandoned and irradiated, and are confronted by a Deathclaw which has taken residence there.

== Production ==
=== Development ===
The episode was written by consulting producer Jane Espenson, and directed by Stephen Williams. It was Espenson's first writing credit and Williams' first directing credit.

=== Filming ===
Ella Purnell said that Lucy killing the Ghouls under the influence of drugs was her favorite scene to film in the season, explaining "it's like something you'd never in a million years think Lucy would do. I particularly love the bit where she realizes she's not herself, and The Ghoul explains to her what's caused her altered state of mind." She added, "She's really trying to justify it, which I think is perfect. It's such good writing. It's the perfect amalgamation of Lucy genuinely trying to do the right thing, but also tinged by the drugs talking."

=== Music ===
The episode features many songs, including "Rum and Coca-Cola" by The Andrews Sisters, "Cocaine Blues" by Roy Hogsed, and "He's a Demon, He's a Devil, He's a Doll" by Betty Hutton.

== Critical reception ==
"The Demon in the Snow" received highly positive reviews from critics. Matt Purslow of IGN gave the episode a "great" 8 out 10 rating and wrote in his verdict, "Lucy and The Ghoul finally reach the New Vegas strip this week, and their long journey is rewarded with two of the show's more spectacular creations, which also happen to be two of the season's best video game nods: the ghoulified Kings and, finally, a deathclaw. Underground, things finally seem to be moving in interesting directions, suggesting there are more secrets in the vaults than just Bud's Buds. But the real big bang of the episode comes courtesy of the Brotherhood of Steel's plotline, in which Maximus' attempts to do some kind of good result in dozens of people shooting the shit out of each other. With civil war erupting and the Cold Fusion device taken, the balance of power in the wasteland is about to shift once more."

William Hughes of The A.V. Club gave the episode an "A–" grade and wrote, "Fans of the Fallout games will already know how fucked our heroes are by the time Lucy's making jokes about giant eggshells; everybody else can presumably infer it from seeing The Ghoul shit himself with fear for the first time in the series' run. The show (which has held off on this aspect of the Fallout bestiary for as long as it probably reasonably could) doesn't say the word here. But anyone who’s ever faced down one of these fuckers knows: It's Deathclaw time. Expect misery and mayhem to follow in its wake."

Jack King of Vulture gave the episode a 4 star rating out of 5 and wrote, "Ring–a-ding-ding, baby! Well, it's been a long four-episode road, but we're finally in New Vegas. Fallout fans will have already seen the “leaked” photos of the (extremely public) Vegas set built atop a Los Angeles strip mall earlier this year; even so, it's something else entirely to see postapocalyptic Sin City in all of its cinematized, VFX-augmented glory."

Eric Francisco of Esquire wrote, ""The Demon in the Snow," the fourth episode of Fallout season 2, is another dosage of high energy and forward-moving direction." Chris Gallardo of Telltale TV gave the episode a 4 star rating out of 5 and wrote, "Fallout Season 2 Episode 4 finally gives Maximus the push he needs as a lead while meticulously expanding what's happening in the Vaults. It might be a bit much, with all of the moving parts finally coming into play. That said, the scale of how each arc is handled starts to make them all the more intriguing."

Ross Bonaime of Collider gave the episode a 7 out of 10 and wrote, "While this is definitely an episode of table-setting, the storylines for Maximus, as well as Lucy and the Ghoul, are thrilling in their own right. However, by comparison, the story in the Vaults is starting to wane, even though it does seem all hell could break loose at any second. Nevertheless, "The Demon in the Show" is an exciting way to get viewers ready for the rest of Season 2." Alexandria Ingham of TV Fanatic gave the episode a 4.7 star rating out of 5 and wrote, "Fallout Season 2 Episode 4 makes up for the slightly filler episode that Episode 3 was, and it's a great way to get us to the halfway point of the season."

Sean T. Collins of Decider wrote, "In conclusion, more shows should feature sexist pigs getting stabbed through the tongue by warrior women and end on cliffhangers pertaining to whether or not the main characters get eaten by a monster. Fallout remains as highly addictive as ever, and my advice is the same as the Ghoul's: Do more drugs." Greg Wheeler of The Review Geek gave the episode a 3.5 star rating out of 5 and wrote, "All things considered, this was a pretty good episode, with the ending leaving everything hanging in the balance for all our main storylines."
