= The Handoff =

- Fallout episode
- Episode no.: Season 2 Episode 7
- Directed by: Stephen Williams
- Written by: Kieran Fitzgerald
- Cinematography by: Bruce McCleery
- Editing by: Micah Gardner
- Original air date: January 27, 2026
- Running time: 51 minutes

Guest appearances
- Johnny Pemberton as Thaddeus; Annabel O'Hagan as Stephanie Harper; Dave Register as Chet; Leslie Uggams as Betty Pearson; Martha Kelly as Representative Diane Welch; Clancy Brown as U.S. President; Natasha Henstridge as Joan; Jon Gries as Biff; Jon Daly as the Snake Oil Salesman; Adam Faison as Ronnie McCurtry; Rachel Marsh as Claudia; Rajat Suresh as Clark; Jeremy Levick as Pete; Justin Theroux as Robert House

Episode chronology
← Previous "The Other Player"	Next → "The Strip"
- Fallout season 2

"The Handoff" is the seventh episode of the second season of the American post-apocalyptic drama television series Fallout. It is the fifteenth overall episode of the series and was written by co-executive producer Kieran Fitzgerald, and directed by Stephen Williams. It was released on Amazon Prime Video on January 27, 2026.

The series depicts the aftermath of an apocalyptic nuclear exchange in an alternate history of Earth where advances in nuclear technology after World War II led to the emergence of a retrofuturistic society and a subsequent resource war. The survivors took refuge in fallout shelters known as Vaults, built to preserve humanity in the event of nuclear annihilation. In the episode, Lucy tries to stop Hank from using his brainwashed crew for his schemes, while Maximus and the Ghoul try to locate Lucy. Meanwhile, Steph's past is explored.

The episode received generally positive reviews from critics, who praised the performances and character development (particularly Steph), but many were mixed over its pacing and lack of momentum.

== Plot ==
Before the war, Steph escapes an internment camp in American-occupied Canada with her mother. When her mother is wounded, she sends Steph away, instructing her not to see Americans as humans. She makes her way to the border, where she murders a customs officer. By 2077, she finds work in Las Vegas, where she meets Hank while seeking a job with Vault-Tec. Cooper, advised by Congresswoman Diane Welch, decides to hand over a cold fusion relic to the President.

In 2296, at the Vault-Tec facility, Hank explains to Lucy the method and purpose of his brainwashed crew. He lets her drive a golf cart, explaining that his actions are beneficial for a greater cause. He tries to get her to return to their normal routine, while downplaying the actions in the New California Republic. Maximus, Thaddeus, and the Ghoul agree to rescue Lucy in exchange for the relic, and they make their way to New Vegas using the armors. Reaching the New Vegas Strip, Thaddeus' arm falls off as a result of his mutation, Maximus battles Deathclaws in power armor and the Ghoul infiltrates the Lucky 38.

Norm recovers and is freed by Claudia, who urges him to flee. He instead transmits a radio message to Lucy, but is recaptured by the Vault-Tec executives. Inside the Vaults, Betty gives Steph a box belonging to Hank. As Steph makes arrangements, Chet discovers Woody's glasses in the garbage disposal, and reluctantly shatters them. During the wedding, Chet refuses to marry her, accusing her of killing Woody and reveals her true identity as a Canadian. Steph flees the scene, locking herself in an office.

Lucy handcuffs Hank in his room, and sets out to shut down the control chips' mainframe. Using Hank's key, she opens the vault to the mainframe, and is shocked to find that it is connected to Diane Welch's severed head. The Ghoul uses the relic to activate a monitor, displaying a big screen. To his shock, House suddenly appears on screen, (Note: As he is depicted in Fallout: New Vegas (2010).) greeting him.

== Production ==
=== Development ===
The episode was written by co-executive producer Kieran Fitzgerald, and directed by Stephen Williams. It was Fitzgerald's second writing credit and Williams' second directing credit.

=== Casting ===
The episode includes a guest appearance by Clancy Brown as the unnamed last President of the United States. He previously worked in the franchise, voicing the Brotherhood of Steel head paladin Rhombus in the first game, released in 1997.

== Critical reception ==
"The Handoff" received positive reviews from critics. Matt Purslow of IGN gave the episode a "good" 7 out 10 rating and wrote in his verdict, "After last week's episode dedicated itself to reorganizing the board and all its many pieces, Episode 7 feels like another chapter that's tasked with a lot of work – there are loose threads and unsolved mysteries to be connected, and the final remaining dominos in need of setting up ahead of the finale. All this feels more satisfying than the previous chapter thanks to answered questions and the partial pulling back of curtains, but we're definitely still in Fallout Season 2's lull before the storm."

William Hughes of The A.V. Club gave the episode a "B+" grade and wrote, "I'm on the record as liking Steph, with Annabel O'Hagan giving a performance that walks the line between Fallout's comedy and drama halves better than many of her fellow Vault Dwellers do. And I like what this episode does with her, threading the character's literally cutthroat need for survival through both the show's past and its potential futures. But the existence of this episode as, essentially, half a spotlight for the character does make me a little sad about some of the things Fallout sacrifices with its “move every portion of our plot forward six inches every episode” approach to storytelling."

Jack King of Vulture gave the episode a 4 star rating out of 5 and wrote, "The Steph B-plot is very much in line with one of the key themes of Fallout across its two seasons: the idea that you never truly know someone, nor the actual content of their character, whether they be your doting — and widely respected — father, the loving wife with whom you share a daughter, or an irradiated Clint Eastwood cosplayer."

Eric Francisco of Esquire wrote, "With Fallout season 2 so close to the end, it doesn't seem in the cards that we'll learn more about Clancy Brown's POTUS before season 3. But the Prime Video series has done the impossible for longtime Fallout fans: It brought the president out of hiding." Chris Gallardo of Telltale TV gave the episode a 3.2 star rating out of 5 and wrote, "Fallout Season 2 Episode 7 is a mixed bag that pushes Steph to the forefront all while trying to get the main storylines to their peak as quickly as possible. While allowing Steph to further develop does show her potential to become a lead, the Vaults storyline has felt a bit diluted overall."

Ross Bonaime of Collider gave the episode a 7 out of 10 and wrote, ""The Handoff" puts Fallout in an exciting place for Season 2 to wrap up. Heading toward the finale, it looks as though we're going to see just how high the corruption in the government goes, both in the past and in the present, as well as some of the major power players in the Wasteland. "The Handoff" not only raises some great questions before the end of Season 2, but fleshes out the show's characters (especially Stephanie) in important and key ways." Alexandria Ingham of TV Fanatic gave the episode a 4.5 star rating out of 5 and wrote, "Fallout Season 2 Episode 7 raises so many questions going into the finale, and I can't see how the finale can deliver on many of them. However, I'm here for it because this has been one wild and enjoyable ride."

Sean T. Collins of Decider wrote, "It's weird to refer to a show as wild and woolly as Fallout as having done anything elegantly, but I really am impressed by how this penultimate episode of the season advanced all of its storylines without feeling scattershot." Greg Wheeler of The Review Geek gave the episode a 3 star rating out of 5 and wrote, "The show decides not to follow that and go its own way, and perhaps not for the better. 7 episodes in, we have several plotlines here that aren't advancing the story along at all. Everything inside and outside the Vault feels like window dressing, and its taken effectively 13 episodes before we see anything about Stephanie and what her past looks like."
