= The Wrangler =

- Fallout episode
- Episode no.: Season 2 Episode 5
- Directed by: Liz Friedlander
- Written by: Owen Ellickson
- Cinematography by: John Conroy
- Editing by: Micah Gardner
- Original air date: January 14, 2026
- Running time: 57 minutes

Guest appearances
- Sarita Choudhury as Kate Williams / Lee Moldaver; Martha Kelly as Representative Diane Welch; Jon Daly as the Snake Oil Salesman; Dale Dickey as Ma June; Rafi Silver as Robert House's Double; Edwin Lee Gibson as Shotgun Jeff; Rachel Marsh as Claudia; Adam Faison as Ronnie McCurtry; Jeremy Levick as Pete; Rajat Suresh as Clark; Tony Robinette as Simon; Justin Theroux as Robert House

Episode chronology
← Previous "The Demon in the Snow"	Next → "The Other Player"
- Fallout season 2

"The Wrangler" is the fifth episode of the second season of the American post-apocalyptic drama television series Fallout. It is the thirteenth overall episode of the series and was written by co-executive producer Owen Ellickson, and directed by Liz Friedlander. It was released on Amazon Prime Video on January 14, 2026.

The series depicts the aftermath of an apocalyptic nuclear exchange in an alternate history of Earth where advances in nuclear technology after World War II led to the emergence of a retrofuturistic society and a subsequent resource war. The survivors took refuge in fallout shelters known as Vaults, built to preserve humanity in the event of nuclear annihilation. In the episode, the Ghoul and Lucy take refuge in New Vegas, while Norm discovers new information about Vault-Tec.

The episode received critical acclaim, with critics praising the reunion between Cooper Howard and Robert House, the world-building, and the ending.

== Plot ==
In 2077, Cooper Howard arrives in Las Vegas, where he is assigned by Kate Williams to kill Robert House and retrieve the cold fusion technology. He refuses to kill House, making it clear he will just retrieve cold fusion. Accompanying Barb and Hank to the Lucky 38, he meets House at his penthouse suite, where House reveals he knows about Cooper's assignment and plans to use cold fusion to survive indefinitely, concluding that an oncoming nuclear war, caused by an unknown third party rather than himself or Vault-Tec, is inevitable. He also notes that day the war's certainty was calculated was the date of birth of Janey, Cooper's daughter. Cooper rejects House, consoling himself by drinking before confronting Barb of what he learned.

In 2296, Lucy and the Ghoul find themselves cornered by Deathclaws in the New Vegas Strip. They barely manage to evade them and take refuge in the Freeside district. While the Ghoul visits a bar, Lucy enters a shop, where she steals a power fist and a drug to remedy her addiction. When a thief posing as the owner becomes suspicious, Lucy kills him.

Norm and the Vault-Tec executives reach the ruins of the company's headquarters, gaining access to Barbara Howard's notes. On a computer, Norm uncovers information about the Forced Evolutionary Virus (FEV), and opens up to Claudia, a Vault-Tec executive who is critical of the company. However, Ronnie overhears their conversation. He overpowers and strangles him.

In the secret Vault-Tec facility, Hank kidnaps a California snake oil salesman and implants a control chip. After numerous failures, the chip finally works on the salesman.

When Lucy reunites with the Ghoul, they are approached by the now-mind-controlled salesman, who offers the safety of the Ghoul's family in exchange for Lucy's return to Vault 33. The Ghoul then reveals he brought Lucy to negotiate with Hank, and prepares to accept the deal, sedating Lucy. Upset with his betrayal, Lucy wakes up and uses the power fist to punch the Ghoul out of a window, impaling him on a pole. Before losing consciousness, she is greeted by Hank.

== Production ==
=== Development ===
The episode was written by co-executive producer Owen Ellickson, and directed by Liz Friedlander. It was Ellickson's first writing credit and Friedlander's second directing credit.

=== Writing ===
Justin Theroux admired the mystery surrounding House, "It's a character I haven't played before or it doesn't feel close to any other character I've played before. The writing is fantastic, so it's like tick, tick, tick, tick, tick. The directors were fabulous. And then obviously, the biggest tick is getting to, for the first time, work with Walton." Theroux also said that reserving the character's big reveal until this episode was part of the plan, "I think that's part of the enigmatic charm of House is that there's proxy House. There are other Houses out there, but there's only one real House. And I think that's partly out of necessity, and also because he's just so weird that he can't really afford to go into the real world." Rafi Silver, who plays his double, compared House's use of doubles to Howard Hughes, "we think that he has an actor playing him as the public persona, and that's who you are."

Regarding the Ghoul's betrayal of Lucy, showrunner Geneva Robertson-Dworet said, "It's very jarring for her to realize that he's still using her. It's still exactly the dynamic that they had when they first met in Season 1, when he dangles her into the water to bait a Gulper to come potentially eat her." She said that all the conflicts escalating would lead to some interesting plotlines, "I think may make her more receptive to what he is suggesting, but she's still Lucy. She's someone who also has a real, very deep core sense of morality and she doesn't trust her father and she knows he's a mass murderer and judges him tremendously. She's very conflicted about him. So I hope that audiences are excited to see what happens when the two of them are together." Ella Purnell added that Lucy using the gauntlet to punch the Ghoul out of the window is a sign that she is becoming more like the Ghoul, "He said to her in Season 1, ‘You are me, sweetie, just give it time.’ This is what he means. It's that age-old prophecy: What you fear is what you create. She spent so long trying to not be like him and suppressing and it comes out."

== Critical reception ==
"The Wrangler" received critical acclaim. Matt Purslow of IGN gave the episode a "great" 8 out 10 rating and wrote in his verdict, "Fallout Season 2’s fifth episode is its most honed and coherent yet. By narrowing the focus to (mostly) just the stories of Lucy and The Ghoul, it's able to craft a tight, impactful chapter that concludes in emotional tragedy that echoes across the timeline. While its big Robert House reveal falls flat due to a number of factors, the suggestion that Cooper Howard may be inescapably linked to the apocalypse ensures the flashback sequences still land with a bang. And while Norm's scenes initially appear to be the odd ones out, their connection to the grander plot means we're finally getting to see the outline of Season 2's big picture."

William Hughes of The A.V. Club gave the episode an "A" grade and wrote, "I rarely end an episode of Fallout asking “Well, what the hell happens next?” As I said up top, it's not really an itch this show scratches for me or where its strengths tend to lay. But damn if the second season hasn't achieved something like real story momentum by this point, as both our past and present plotlines build toward what are feeling like major reveals. All of the things that are always good about Fallout make a strong showing here, of course, as it pivots between absurdity and heartbreak, letting its Wasteland weirdos shine even as its core characters show off their fractured humanity."

Jack King of Vulture gave the episode a 4 star rating out of 5 and wrote, "Not only was this a wildly entertaining episode in which a lot of shit went down, but it's hard to think of another — save for the season-one finale, perhaps — that has been more consequential for the series at large."

Eric Francisco of Esquire wrote, "For now, the role of F.E.V. in the television Fallout is yet to be known. But as a new war brews across the wasteland, with the Brotherhood of Steel plunging into civil war and the New California Republic and Caesar's Legion at each other's throats — not to mention Lucy's father slowly resurrecting Vault-Tec from the dead — it's only a matter of time before the whole place gets sicker than ever." Chris Gallardo of Telltale TV gave the episode a 4.2 star rating out of 5 and wrote, "Fallout Season 2 Episode 5 perfectly presents the idea of who a person decides they should be through Cooper and Mr. House's formal meeting, Lucy's in-town visitations, and more. This episode not only leaves the right amount of emotional baggage to carry forward, but also puts more narrative suspicion on what's really going on."

Ross Bonaime of Collider gave the episode a 7 out of 10 and wrote, ""The Wrangler," fitting to its name, has to wrangle a lot of details, storylines, and characters into the final hours of Season 2, but does so extremely well. This season has often focused primarily on Lucy's fall from grace and the Ghoul's troubled past, and narrowing in on that leads to an incredibly strong episode that puts them in interesting places. We knew getting to Las Vegas was going to be wild, but "The Wrangler" truly shows just how much it's going to test our characters going forward." Alexandria Ingham of TV Fanatic gave the episode a 4.5 star rating out of 5 and wrote, "Fallout Season 2 Episode 5 has left us with far more questions than answers, and it's hard to believe there are only three episodes to wrap it all up, especially after focusing on only two locations during the episode."

Sean T. Collins of Decider wrote, "This episode of Fallout teaches us you can't trust Fallout first and foremost, so take everything I'm about to say with a grain of salt. But it certainly appears that much of what we've learned about the origin and architects of the apocalypse has been a lie. And even in the current-day storyline, it's best not to take the word of even your closest allies at face value." Greg Wheeler of The Review Geek gave the episode a 4 star rating out of 5 and wrote, "Despite being a slightly slower episode, this one has a lot more character work and it shines as a result. There's a lot to sink your teeth into here and Fallout continues to deliver great drama on that front."
