= The Profligate =

- Fallout episode
- Episode no.: Season 2 Episode 3
- Directed by: Liz Friedlander
- Written by: Chaz Hawkins
- Cinematography by: John Conroy
- Editing by: Micah Gardner
- Original air date: December 31, 2025
- Running time: 55 minutes

Guest appearances
- Johnny Pemberton as Thaddeus; Michael Cristofer as Elder Cleric Quintus; Kumail Nanjiani as Xander Harkness; Macaulay Culkin as Lacerta Legate; Martha Kelly as Representative Welch; Barbara Eve Harris as Rodriguez; Dallas Goldtooth as Charles Whiteknife; Jon Gries as Biff; Sisa Grey as Yosemite Elder; Justin Theroux as Robert House

Episode chronology
← Previous "The Golden Rule"	Next → "The Demon in the Snow"
- Fallout season 2

"The Profligate" is the third episode of the second season of the American post-apocalyptic drama television series Fallout. It is the eleventh overall episode of the series and was written by Chaz Hawkins, and directed by Liz Friedlander. It was released on Amazon Prime Video on December 31, 2025.

The series depicts the aftermath of an apocalyptic nuclear exchange in an alternate history of Earth where advances in nuclear technology after World War II led to the emergence of a retrofuturistic society and a subsequent resource war. The survivors took refuge in fallout shelters known as Vaults, built to preserve humanity in the event of nuclear annihilation. The episode expands on Caesar's Legion and the New California Republic (NCR) in the Mojave while also showing Maximus making decisions on the future of the Brotherhood of Steel.

The episode received highly positive reviews from critics, who praised the performances and ending.

== Plot ==
In 2077, Cooper Howard is confronted by Robert House at a veterans' event, whom the former does not recognise yet. After questioning his and his war comrade Charlie's loyalties, House cryptically tells him that they will meet again.

In 2296, Lucy is captured by Caesar's Legion who execute the woman, a Legion slave, she was escorting. Lucy learns that after Caesar's death, (Note: As depicted in Fallout: New Vegas (2010).) the Legion splintered into two opposing factions due to a succession crisis. Despite attempting to offer her services in conflict resolution, she is crucified.

The Ghoul manages to cure himself by cutting out the poisoned section of his leg. After tracking Lucy to the rival Legion camps, he travels to Camp Golf to enlist the aid of the NCR. Finding the base abandoned, he is told by the securitron Victor that there is only a single NCR unit left in the region. The Ghoul locates them but declines their request for help, instead opting to sell them out to the Legion in exchange for Lucy's freedom. As they leave the Legion camps the Ghoul blows up Caesar's body, causing the two factions to descend into civil war.

At Area 51, the Yosemite Elder refuses to take part in the coup against the Commonwealth chapter after the surprise arrival of Commonwealth Paladin Xander Harkness. After his suggestion to kill Xander is coldly rebuffed by Elder Quintus, Maximus speaks to Xander who invites him on a flight in a vertibird to discuss alternative options to war. The two start to get along, and Maximus is impressed by the Commonwealth's technology, including a super sledge which Xander uses as the two destroy a Securitron. The two then discover a bottle cap plant that Thaddeus has been managing, using child labor. Thaddeus and Maximus both plead with Xander not to kill the ghoul children, which he refuses. Maximus then kills Xander with the super sledge, realising he has probably started a war.

== Production ==
=== Development ===
The episode was written by Chaz Hawkins, and directed by Liz Friedlander. It was Hawkins' second writing credit and Friedlander's first directing credit.

=== Writing ===
Regarding Maximus' decision to kill Harkness, Aaron Moten said this is "from a more personable place, but [also] more morally correct." On unleashing a new war, he added, "It's maybe the last thing he would wish for. [Executive producer] Jonah [Nolan] and [showrunners] Graham [Wagner] and Geneva [Robertson-Dworet] do this incredible thing when writing the stories where your characters have no choice but to continue, like we all have to as human beings. So they put us into these circumstances where choice is limited in certain times, but you see the characters doing what they can to make sure that they can survive."

=== Casting ===
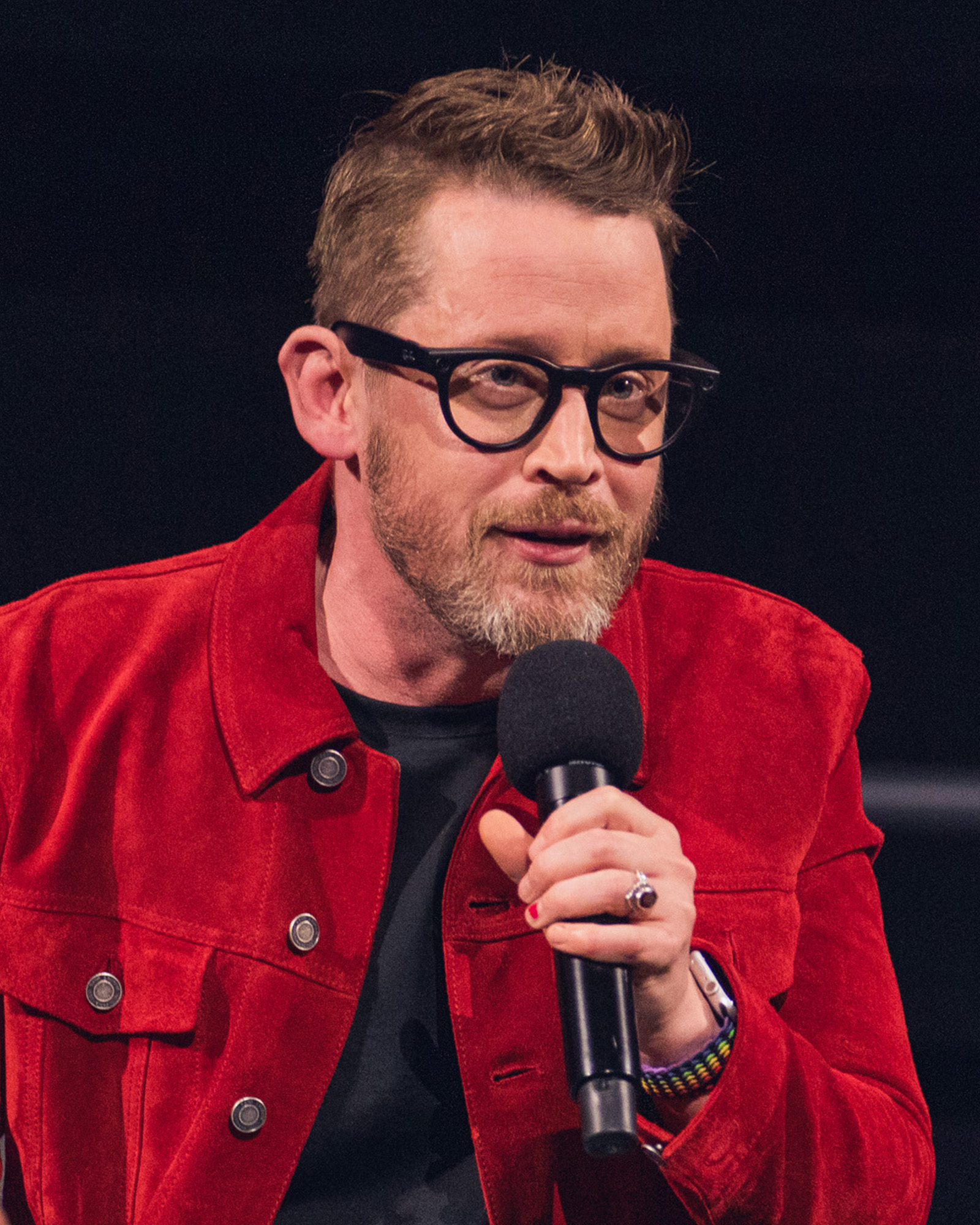
Macaulay Culkin makes his debut in the series with this episode.

In November 2024, Macaulay Culkin was reported to have joined the second season in an undisclosed role. Co-showrunner Geneva Robertson-Dworet praised the actor, saying, "We were so honored to have him. We met with him before he started and he's such a thoughtful person and I love what he brought to the role. He had this very particular read on the kind of character that he wanted to play within the Legion and I think he really brought that to the screen."

=== Music ===
The episode features many songs, including "Chain Gang" by Sam Cooke, "The Yellow Rose of Texas" by Mitch Miller, and "Hot Dog Buddy Buddy" by Bill Haley & His Comets.

== Critical reception ==
"The Profligate" received highly positive reviews from critics. Matt Purslow of IGN gave the episode a "great" 8 out 10 rating and wrote in his verdict, "Civil wars are erupting all over the wasteland in Fallout Season 2's third chapter, and in the middle of it all are two men making hugely important decisions that will shape their destinies. While it's a shame that Lucy had to be put in crucifixion time-out for most of this episode, and Robert House's not-so-mysterious identity continues to be a sticking point, this is an otherwise fantastic, character-driven episode that thrives on bringing important elements from the New Vegas video game into the spotlight. It's packed with so much good stuff that I didn't even get to mention Victor the Securitron's guest appearance, but I'm sure you're as pleased as me that he's still rolling around the Mojave."

William Hughes of The A.V. Club gave the episode a "B+" grade and wrote, "So, a few minor performance and script quibbles aside, “The Profligate” is easily the most focused episode that Fallout has posted in its second season to date, following just two plotlines, which manage to meaningfully rhyme with each other in genuinely interesting ways."

Jack King of Vulture gave the episode a 4 star rating out of 5 and wrote, "As in season one, the best part of these first three episodes has been the continued exploration of the duality of the Ghoul and Cooper Howard." Sean T. Collins of Decider wrote, "When I press play on any given episode, I sit back secure in the knowledge that everything I see will be entertaining. Some of it will be funny in a nice way. Some of it will be funny in an extremely nasty way. [...] All on Amazon's dime! Fallout has the giddy feeling of people getting away with something, and it's infectious as fuck."

Eric Francisco of Esquire wrote, "Only in the wastelands can child labor look like summer camp. In the newest episode of Fallout, our characters split up once again to push forward a plot that is (finally!) really getting somewhere." Ross Bonaime of Collider gave the episode a 8 out of 10 and wrote, ""The Profligate" at times feels like a side quest, especially surrounding Lucy and the Ghoul at the Legion's headquarters. Yet Episode 3 is great at mixing absurdity and brutality while also showing how the characters are evolving this season. As the show recenters itself around its three characters and starts to explore the history of the Wasteland and the people who made it what it is today, Fallout makes its world feel more fleshed out than ever before in Season 2."

Alexandria Ingham of TV Fanatic wrote, "These slower episodes are needed because of that, but as a standalone episode, this one didn't work. At least, one bad episode does not a show destroy." Greg Wheeler of The Review Geek gave the episode a 4 star rating out of 5 and wrote, "The best written character in the show though is the Ghoul/Coop. The ironic symbolism of him cutting out a toxic part of himself before deciding to do something good and help out Lucy is a nice way of developing his character too."
