= Fallout season 2 =

Fallout
- Season 2
- Promotional poster
- Showrunners: Graham Wagner; Geneva Robertson-Dworet
- Starring: Ella Purnell; Aaron Moten; Moisés Arias; Frances Turner; Kyle MacLachlan; Walton Goggins
- No. of episodes: 8

Release
- Original network: Amazon Prime Video
- Original release: December 16, 2025 – February 3, 2026

Season chronology
- ← Previous; Season 1 Next → Season 3

The second season of the American post-apocalyptic drama television series Fallout premiered on December 16, 2025 on Amazon Prime Video, with the remaining episodes released weekly through February 3, 2026. Based on the role-playing video game franchise created by Tim Cain and Leonard Boyarsky, (Note: Fallout was created by Tim Cain and Leonard Boyarsky, and developed by Black Isle Studios, and formerly published by Interplay Entertainment from 1997 to 2004. It has been owned by ZeniMax Media and developed by Bethesda Game Studios since 2007.) the series is set two centuries after the Great War of 2077, in which society has collapsed following a nuclear holocaust.

The season stars Ella Purnell, Aaron Moten, Moisés Arias, Frances Turner, Kyle MacLachlan, and Walton Goggins. This season continues the story set in the wasteland of post-nuclear America and introduced New Vegas, a major location from the video game Fallout: New Vegas.

The season received positive reviews from critics, praising the character development, performances, visuals, and production values. It received ten nominations at the 78th Primetime Emmy Awards.

== Cast and characters ==
=== Main ===
- Ella Purnell as Lucy MacLean, a Vault 33 Dweller
  - Grace Kelly Quigley portrays young Lucy MacLean
- Aaron Moten as Maximus, a knight of the Brotherhood of Steel
  - Amir Carr portrays young Maximus
- Moisés Arias as Norm MacLean, Vault 33 resident and Lucy's younger brother
  - Cody Alexander Guevara portrays young Norm MacLean
- Frances Turner as Barb Howard, Cooper's wife and high-ranking Vault-Tec executive
- Kyle MacLachlan as Hank MacLean, Lucy and Norm's father and former Overseer of Vault 33
- Walton Goggins as Cooper Howard / The Ghoul, a Hollywood actor and Vault-Tec ambassador before the Great War, who mutated into a ghoul and is now a gunslinger and bounty hunter

=== Recurring ===
- Leslie Uggams as Betty Pearson, Vault 33 Overseer
  - Princess Bey portrays young Betty Pearson
- Annabel O'Hagan as Stephanie Harper, Vault 32 Overseer
- Dave Register as Chet, Lucy and Norm's cousin and a Vault 32 resident
- Rodrigo Luzzi as Reg McPhee, Vault 33 councillor
- Justin Theroux as Robert Edwin House, the CEO of RobCo Industries and ruler of the New Vegas Strip in 2281
  - Rafi Silver portrays a body-double version of the character
- Leer Leary as Davey, Vault 32 resident
- Michael Cristofer as Elder Cleric Quintus, Maximus' superior and leader of the Brotherhood of Steel San Fernando chapter
- Xelia Mendes-Jones as Dane, a scribe of the Brotherhood of Steel
- Rachel Marsh as Claudia, a novice Vault-Tec employee who was cryogenically frozen in Vault 31
- Adam Faison as Ronnie McCurtry, Bud Askin's former assistant and one of the Vault-Tec employees who were cryogenically frozen in Vault 31
- Rajat Suresh and Jeremy Levick as Clark and Pete, part of the group of Vault-Tec employees who were cryogenically frozen in Vault 31
- Johnny Pemberton as Thaddeus, a former squire of the Brotherhood of Steel who mutated into a ghoul
- Martha Kelly as Representative Diane Welch, a pre-apocalypse congresswoman for the district of Glendale
- Jon Gries as Biff, a ranger for the New California Republic
- Jon Daly as the Snake Oil Salesman, a mercantile denizen of the wasteland

=== Guest ===
- Sarita Choudhury as Kate Williams / Lee Moldaver, a nuclear scientist who survived the Great War and later became a New California Republic (NCR) commander
- Michael Esper as Bud Askins / Brain-on-a-Roomba, a senior junior vice president at Vault-Tec in 2077 and the Overseer of Vault 31 post-war
- Susan Berger as Old Woman Gretch, an elderly soup seller
- Jared Bankens as Nick the Prick, the leader of the Great Khans raiders
- Christopher Matthew Cook as Bill, a pre-apocalypse bar patron
- Teagan Meredith as Janey Howard, Cooper's daughter
- Kumail Nanjiani as Paladin Xander Harkness, a liaison to the Commonwealth Brotherhood of Steel
- Bashir Salahuddin and Shinelle Azoroh as Joseph and Julia, Maximus' father and mother
- Brian Thompson, Sisa Grey, and Chris Browning as the Coronado Elder, Yosemite Elder, and Grand Canyon Elder, the cleric leaders of separate Brotherhood of Steel chapters
- Judson Mills as Stephen Winthrop, a rich businessman cryogenically frozen by Vault-Tec
- Tim Soergel as Gnatius, a knight of the Brotherhood
- Macaulay Culkin as Lacerta Legate, a high-ranking member of Caesar's Legion, a society inspired by Ancient Roman traditions
- Barbara Eve Harris as Rodriguez, a captain of the New California Republic
- Dallas Goldtooth as Charles Whiteknife, a pre-apocalypse war veteran and actor friend of Cooper's
- Guy Heilweil, Ava Scarola, and Alyssa Riley Ndati as Perry, Lois, and Trudy, children who work in Thaddeus' factory
- Zach Cherry as Woody Thomas, Vault 32 resident and a former Vault 33 councillor
- Ciel Shi as Wenjie, a pre-apocalypse Chinese soldier
- Dale Dickey as Ma June, a cantankerous shopkeeper who previously lived in the settlement of Filly
- Edythe Jason as Barv, June's partner and a former resident of Filly
- Edwin Lee Gibson as Shotgun Jeff, a bartender in New Vegas
- Tony Robinette as Simon, the shopkeeper for the Sunny's Sundries general store in New Vegas
- Michael Emerson as Dr. Siggi Wilzig, an enigmatic member of the Enclave
- Ron Perlman as a super mutant who encounters Cooper
- Clancy Brown as the last pre-apocalypse President of the United States
- Natasha Henstridge as Joan, Stephanie's pre-apocalypse mother who attempts to escape with her from Canada

== Episodes ==
No. overall	No. in season	Title	Directed by	Written by	Original release date
9	1	"The Innovator"	Frederick E. O. Toye	Geneva Robertson-Dworet & Graham Wagner	December 16, 2025
In 2077 before the war, Robert House, CEO of RobCo Industries, implants a control chip in a bar patron which forces him to murder his companions before the chip explodes. After uncovering Vault-Tec's secret plans, actor Cooper Howard attempts to flee with his daughter Janey, but Lee Moldaver (then known as Kate Williams) convinces him to spy on his wife Barb, who is traveling to Las Vegas to meet House. In 2296, Lucy MacLean and the Ghoul kill a group of Great Khans while tracking Lucy's father, which leads them to the abandoned Vault 24. They discover a Vault-Tec experiment using chips for brainwashing. A man with an implanted chip briefly speaks to Lucy before the chip explodes. Norm, trapped in Vault 31 without food or water, awakens Vault-Tec junior executives from stasis. In Vault 32, Overseer Steph struggles with leadership while in Vault 33, Overseer Betty supervises repairs to the water chip. Hank arrives at an abandoned Vault-Tec facility and leaves a message for House that he will finish House's project.
10	2	"The Golden Rule"	Frederick E. O. Toye	Chris Brady-Denton	December 24, 2025
In 2283, a caravan trader with an implanted chip under Hank's control smuggles a nuclear bomb into Shady Sands, destroying the city; only young Maximus survives. In 2296, Lucy aids a woman wounded in a radscorpion attack, against the Ghoul's wishes; she denies him her last Stimpak because of his cruelty. The woman leads Lucy into an ambush by the Legion. Norm leads the reawakened Vault-Tec executives to the surface, under the pretense that it is a final test from Bud Askins. Hank continues his chip tests, first on mice, then on a reawakened Vault-Tec customer; each test is a failure, causing the subjects' heads to explode. Maximus and his chapter of the Brotherhood of Steel take Area 51 as their new base. Elder Quintus convinces the Elders of other chapters to stage a civil war against the stronger Commonwealth chapter with the help of the seized cold fusion technology. An envoy of the Commonwealth chapter, Xander Harkness, arrives unexpectedly.
11	3	"The Profligate"	Liz Friedlander	Chaz Hawkins	December 31, 2025
In 2077, House confronts Cooper at a veterans event and questions his loyalties, hinting they will meet again. In 2296, Lucy is captured and crucified by Caesar's Legion, which has split into rival factions after Caesar's death. The Ghoul recovers from his injuries and visits an abandoned New California Republic (NCR) camp, where a Securitron directs him to the last NCR outpost in the Mojave. When the NCR refuses aid against the Legion, the Ghoul negotiates directly with the Legion, trading the outpost location for Lucy's freedom. He secretly sabotages the camp, reigniting conflict between the rival Legion factions. The alliance of western Brotherhood chapters falls apart after the arrival of Harkness. Quintus shames Maximus for offering to kill Harkness, an act that would have incited war with the Commonwealth without the support of the other chapters. Maximus later kills Harkness anyway to stop the slaughter of "abominations" consisting of Thaddeus and a group of ghoul children.
12	4	"The Demon in the Snow"	Stephen Williams	Jane Espenson	January 7, 2026
During the Sino-American War, Cooper is ambushed by Chinese soldiers in Alaska but survives when a Deathclaw kills them. In 2296, Norm grows suspicious of Ronnie, a Vault-Tec executive who seems to know more than he reveals. In Vault 33, a water shortage resulting from the broken water chip leads Betty to consult Steph. They discover that Vault 31 is empty and its experiment effectively over, but Steph withholds help unless she receives a box from Vault 33. Woody overhears and reports the conversation, while Chet learns Steph has a pre-war Canadian ID. Maximus returns to Area 51 with Thaddeus disguised in Harkness' power armor. To prevent the civil war, Maximus attempts but fails to kill Quintus. Chaos erupts after Dane steals the cold fusion relic, forcing Maximus and Thaddeus to flee with it. Lucy recovers at the NCR camp but becomes addicted to a combat drug. She and the Ghoul enter the deserted New Vegas Strip, where they are surprised by a Deathclaw.
13	5	"The Wrangler"	Liz Friedlander	Owen Ellickson	January 14, 2026
In 2077, Kate Williams orders Cooper to kill House and retrieve her cold fusion device; he agrees only to recover the device. Cooper, Barb and Hank travel to the Lucky 38 in Las Vegas, where Cooper confronts House. House, who plans to use the device to survive indefinitely, reveals his mathematical system for predicting the coming apocalypse. He finds Cooper is an unforeseen variable whose sudden involvement alters the parameters of his predictive model. He says that neither Vault-Tec nor he will directly drop the bombs, but he no longer has any idea who will. In 2296, Norm and the Vault 31 executives reach the ruins of Vault-Tec's headquarters. Norm searches for data about Future Enterprise Ventures, but discovers the Forced Evolutionary Virus (FEV) instead. Ronnie overhears Norm admit he is not Bud's successor, and attempts to strangle him to death. Lucy and the Ghoul escape deathclaws and find safety in Freeside. Hank kidnaps a snake oil salesman, successfully implants a control chip, and sends him to Freeside to make the Ghoul an offer he can't refuse: the safety of Barb and Janey (whom Hank has found in stasis in the Vegas HQ) in exchange for transporting Lucy to Vault 33. The Ghoul tranquilizes Lucy, who resists the drug long enough to knock him out the window and impale him on a broken lamppost. Hank arrives and takes Lucy back to the Vegas HQ.
14	6	"The Other Player"	Lisa Joy	Dave Hill	January 21, 2026
In 2077, Cooper confronts Barb about Vault-Tec's plans. Barb reveals she's shielding their family from the inevitable nuclear war by playing a role, only promoting the idea of dropping the bombs after it was suggested first by Dr. Wilzig. Cooper drugs Hank, and Barb extracts the cold fusion relic from him. In 2296, Woody goes missing in Vault 32. Chet learns from a third party that he and Steph are getting married the next day. In Vault 33, Reg stands up to Betty on the snacks budget issue and she dissolves his club. Lucy awakes in the Vegas HQ, where Hank has created an army of brainwashed wastelanders to build more control chips. She arrests Hank to face justice for destroying Shady Sands, but he tricks her into brainwashing two rival wastelanders. The Ghoul is rescued by a Super Mutant just before he goes feral. The Super Mutant attempts to recruit him for a war against the humans but the Ghoul declines; the Super Mutant dumps him in the desert. Dogmeat leads Maximus and Thaddeus to the Ghoul.
15	7	"The Handoff"	Stephen Williams	Kieran Fitzgerald	January 27, 2026
Before the war, Steph escapes an internment camp in American-occupied Canada with her mother, who is mortally wounded. In 2077, she finds work in Las Vegas, where she meets Hank while seeking a job with Vault-Tec. Cooper, advised by Congresswoman Diane Welch, decides to hand over a cold fusion relic to the President. In 2296, Norm recovers and manages to transmit a radio message to Lucy but is captured by the Vault-Tec executives. Inside the Vaults, Betty gives Steph a box belonging to Hank. During Steph's wedding, Chet accuses her of killing Woody and reveals her true identity. At a Vault-Tec facility, Lucy appears to support Hank's plan but secretly sabotages it by shutting down the control chips' mainframe, run by the preserved head of Welch. Meanwhile, Maximus, Thaddeus, and the Ghoul agree to rescue Lucy in exchange for the relic. On the Strip, Maximus battles Deathclaws in power armor. The Ghoul infiltrates the Lucky 38, uses the relic to activate a monitor, and comes face to face with House on screen.
16	8	"The Strip"	Frederick E. O. Toye	Karey Dornetto	February 3, 2026
In 2077, Hank and Steph get engaged in Las Vegas, while Cooper is arrested after taking the blame for Barb for handing the relic to the President, secretly tied to the Enclave. In 2296, the Legion schism ends when Lacerta Legate proclaims himself Caesar and plans to seize New Vegas. Norm and Claudia survive a radroach attack at Vault-Tec HQ that kills the rest of the Vault-Tec executives as they attempt to bring Norm to trial. In Vault 32, Steph activates a Pip-Boy from Hank's box and contacts the Enclave to begin Phase 2. Fighting between Maximus and Deathclaws reaches Freeside, where the NCR rescues him. The Ghoul enters the Vault-Tec facility with House's help. Lucy mercy kills Welch, but is captured by Hank and then saved by the Ghoul. Lucy implants a control chip in Hank, who admits his Enclave ties before activating it himself and losing his memory. The Ghoul finds his family's cryo-pods empty and a clue pointing to Colorado. Maximus and Lucy reunite as the Legion marches into New Vegas. In a post-credits scene, Dane retrieves Liberty Prime blueprints for Quintus.

== Production ==
=== Development ===
Amazon renewed Fallout for a second season shortly after the success of its first, with showrunners Graham Wagner and Geneva Robertson-Dworet returning. The new season expands the scope of the series to include New Vegas and new factions from the games. The series was renewed for a third season on May 12, 2025, before the second premiered.

=== Casting ===
In November 2024, it was reported that Macaulay Culkin had joined the cast of season 2 in a recurring role as a "crazy genius"-type character. In August 2025, it was announced that Justin Theroux joined the cast as Robert House, a major character from Fallout: New Vegas.

=== Filming ===
In October 2024, actress Leslie Uggams confirmed that production on the second season would begin the following month. Filming began in November 2024 in Los Angeles, after season 1 had filmed across New York, Utah, and Namibia.

Production was temporarily halted in January 2025 due to wildfires in California, delaying filming for several weeks. By late January, leaked set photos showed a prop model of Dinky the Dinosaur’s head from Fallout: New Vegas.

In February 2025, a section of the Valley Plaza mall in North Hollywood was transformed into the New Vegas Strip, with signage for locations including the Ultra-Luxe, Vault 21, and the Lucky 38 casino. Additional leaks in March 2025 depicted interior sets of Camp McCarran and signage referencing Mr. House, along with depictions of pre-war settings. Around the same time, photos also surfaced showing members of Caesar’s Legion and NCR soldiers.

By April 2025, Kyle MacLachlan confirmed that he had finished filming his scenes for the season. Principal photography officially wrapped on May 7, 2025.

Later that month, The New York Times reported that portions of the season had been filmed in California, including a set built to resemble Freeside.

== Release ==
=== Streaming ===
The season premiered on December 16, after an announcement by Prime Video via the Las Vegas Sphere, just one day earlier than the expected December 17, 2025 release date, with the remaining episodes released weekly until February 4, 2026.

On January 26, 2026, Prime Video announced that the release dates for the final two episodes of the season were moved up and they would now be released on Tuesday nights.

=== Home media ===
The second season of Fallout was released on Ultra HD Blu-ray, Blu-ray and DVD on May 19, 2026.

== Reception ==
=== Critical response ===
On Rotten Tomatoes, 96% of 126 critics gave a positive review. The website's critics consensus reads, "Fallout Season Two successfully expands its post-apocalyptic world to deliver everything audiences could want from a video game adaptation, including sumptuous visuals and riveting performances". The second season of Fallout received "generally favorable reviews" according to review aggregator Metacritic, with a weighted score of 73 out of 100 based on 22 reviews.

=== Audience viewership ===
The second season debuted at No. 7 on the Nielsen and drew 794 million minutes of viewing for the week of December 15, 2025, following its premiere.
