= The Other Player =

- Fallout episode
- Episode no.: Season 2 Episode 6
- Directed by: Lisa Joy
- Written by: Dave Hill
- Cinematography by: David Franco
- Editing by: Yoni Reiss
- Original air date: January 21, 2026
- Running time: 51 minutes

Guest appearances
- Johnny Pemberton as Thaddeus; Michael Emerson as Dr. Siggi Wilzig; Leslie Uggams as Betty Pearson; Dave Register as Chet; Rodrigo Luzzi as Reg McPhee; Jon Daly as the Snake Oil Salesman; Jon Gries as Biff; Michael Esper as Bud Askins; Rafi Silver as Robert House's Double; Jared Bankens as Nick the Prick; Ron Perlman as Super Mutant

Episode chronology
← Previous "The Wrangler"	Next → "The Handoff"
- Fallout season 2

"The Other Player" is the sixth episode of the second season of the American post-apocalyptic drama television series Fallout. It is the fourteenth overall episode of the series and was written by co-executive producer Dave Hill, and directed by executive producer Lisa Joy. It was released on Amazon Prime Video on January 21, 2026.

The series depicts the aftermath of an apocalyptic nuclear exchange in an alternate history of Earth where advances in nuclear technology after World War II led to the emergence of a retrofuturistic society and a subsequent resource war. The survivors took refuge in fallout shelters known as Vaults, built to preserve humanity in the event of nuclear annihilation. In the episode, Lucy discovers her father's intentions, while the Ghoul is approached by a potential ally.

The episode received positive reviews from critics, who praised the performances and character development, although some criticized the Vault 33 subplot.

== Plot ==
In 2077, Barb talks with Robert House's double, planning to exchange the cold fusion reactor for a mind-control device. At her bedroom, she is confronted by Cooper Howard, who has discovered she is involved in Vault-Tec's plans. Barb reveals she is shielding their family from the inevitable nuclear war by playing the part, only sharing the idea of dropping the bombs first after it was suggested by Dr. Wilzig. Despite losing her husband's trust, Barb extracts the cold fusion device from Hank after Cooper drugs him.

In 2296, Lucy wakes up at the secret Vault-Tec facility. She makes her way through the facility, where she learns Hank has been kidnapping wastelanders and brainwashing them to build more control chips. Reaching a "Simulation" room modeled after her apartment at Vault 33, she reunites with Hank. He tries to downplay his actions, reaffirming that they serve the greater good. Lucy remains disgusted and apprehends him instead, intending to take him back to Vault 33 and face justice for destroying Shady Sands.

Woody goes missing in Vault 32 while Chet learns he will officially marry Steph. In Vault 33, a defiant Reg stands up to Betty before she closes his club, earning him the citizens' approval. In the desert, Maximus and Thaddeus are forced to leave the power armor behind, knowing the Brotherhood can track it. During the night, they are woken up by Dogmeat; noticing she is carrying the Ghoul's hat, they follow her as she runs off.

Following his defenestration and subsequent impalement, the Ghoul is seemingly deserted by Dogmeat. He experiences the onset of feralness while he struggles but fails to free himself. At night, a Super Mutant saves him and takes him to his hide-out, where he treats the Ghoul's injury. He attempts to recruit him for an upcoming war with the Enclave, the true instigator of the nuclear war. When the Ghoul declines, the Super Mutant knocks him out and dumps him at a different location, where Maximus and Thaddeus discover him the following morning, having been led there by Dogmeat.

== Production ==
=== Development ===
The episode was written by co-executive producer Dave Hill, and directed by executive producer Lisa Joy. It was Hill's first writing credit and Joy's first directing credit.

=== Casting ===
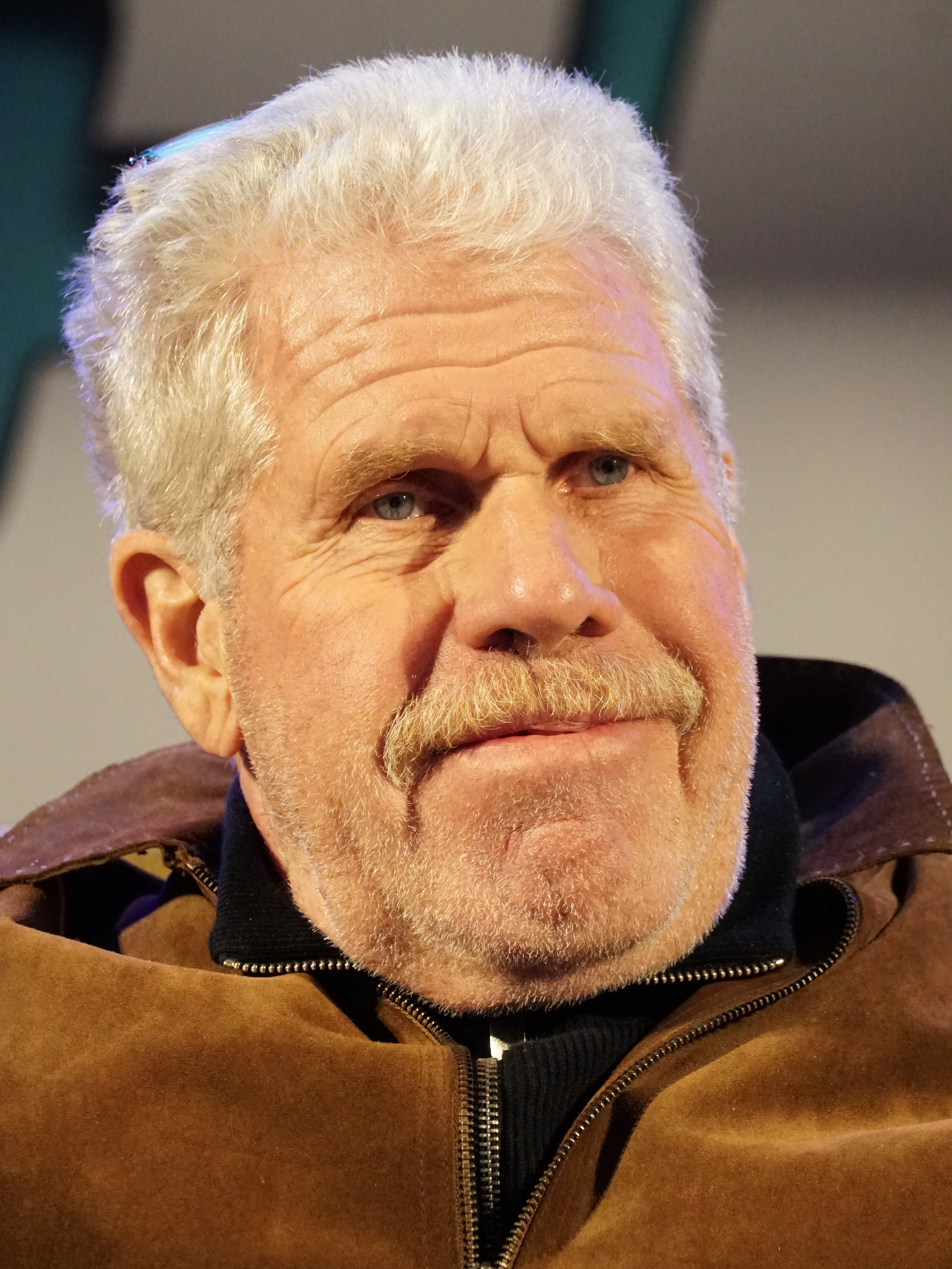
Ron Perlman guest stars in the episode.

Ron Perlman, who narrated every game in the series except Fallout 4 and Fallout: Brotherhood of Steel, guest stars in the episode as an unnamed super mutant who saves the Ghoul's life. When the series was greenlit, Perlman was waiting to be contacted to be involved in some form. The writers were trying to figure out a character with Perlman in mind, before coming up with a character "who feels kind of like you’re finally meeting Colonel Kurtz." Perlman said, "In this post-apocalyptic world, I'm one of the remnants of the dust heap upon which civilization is trying to rebuild itself."

== Critical reception ==
"The Other Player" received positive reviews from critics. Matt Purslow of IGN gave the episode a "good" 7 out 10 rating and wrote in his verdict, "Fallout twists its big Season 1 finale by revealing that there's an entirely different hand steering the apocalypse, finally bringing The Enclave into the picture. Back to back with last week's Mr. House confrontation, this recent set of flashbacks are easily the best of the show so far. But things are more uneven out in the wasteland: while Lucy's morals and her relationship with Hank are tested in interesting, complicated ways, our first encounter with a super mutant is disappointing, as is Fallout's refusal to make the Vault storylines feel a truly essential part of the entire stage."

William Hughes of The A.V. Club gave the episode a "B" grade and wrote, "Thematically, it's actually more cohesive than many episodes this year have been, circling the drain in interesting ways on the basic question of what makes a person good and finally dialing in hard on the ethics and ugliness of “The Automated Man” tech that it's been seeding all season. But as a story it creaks, bouncing around in time unsteadily and undoing a few of the show's most fascinating character moments. With just two episodes left this season, some table-setting is understandable. But I'd love to see something significantly more focused from the series as it cruises into its sophomore finale."

Jack King of Vulture gave the episode a 4 star rating out of 5 and wrote, "Honestly, when you survey the conditions of the wasteland, that question doesn't feel as cleanly open-and-shut as you might otherwise expect it to be, nor does Hank's Vault-Tec (and RobCo) approved remedy seem all that outlandish. But then, perhaps that's the conflict that is most present in all of Fallout: the fight to sustain one's humanity, and the human spirit at large."

Eric Francisco of Esquire wrote, "We know zilch about his "super mutant," other than the obvious and that he has ideas for uniting the wasteland against the humans who ravaged it. Until then, fans are just relishing the fact that a key staple from the games is now realer than ever." Chris Gallardo of Telltale TV gave the episode a 3.7 star rating out of 5 and wrote, "Fallout Season 2 Episode 6 continues to show much-needed progress in Lucy, the Ghoul, and Hank, but has this need to make way for the grand finale. With only two episodes left, I do hope these storylines will conclude in a satisfying way."

Ross Bonaime of Collider gave the episode a 8 out of 10 and wrote, " 'The Other Player' ends in a great place near the end of Season 2. It's a clever episode that leads to questions about which character can be trusted, and really leans into the shades of gray for characters that initially seem just inherently evil." Alexandria Ingham of TV Fanatic gave the episode a 4.5 star rating out of 5 and wrote, "Fallout certainly leaves us with many more questions, but we also get some answers. With two more episodes to go, we’re surely in for an epic climax and cliffhanger."

Sean T. Collins of Decider wrote, "Either way, you can rest assured that bastards like Steph are only ever gonna look out for them and theirs. It's what unites all the rotten characters on this show: her, Hank, Barb, House, Quintus, even the Ghoul at his worst. It's the basis of the factionalism that’s divided the wasteland and further decimated is population. It's a mindset any society determined to survive would do well to reject." Greg Wheeler of The Review Geek gave the episode a 3.5 star rating out of 5 and wrote, "The show does continue to deliver pretty decent drama though and Fallout has been an enjoyable ride so far."
