= Fallout Tactics: Brotherhood of Steel =

2001 video game

Fallout Tactics
- Developer: Micro Forté
- Publisher: 14 Degrees East (Note: Bethesda Softworks published the digital version of the game.)
- Producer: Tony Oakden
- Designer: Ed Orman
- Programmer: Karl Burdack
- Artist: Parrish Rodgers
- Composer: Inon Zur
- Series: Fallout
- Platform: Microsoft Windows
- Release: NA: March 15, 2001; EU: March 30, 2001
- Genre: Tactical role-playing
- Modes: Single-player, multiplayer

Fallout Tactics: A Post Nuclear Tactical Combat Game, or simply Fallout Tactics, is a turn-based real-time tactical role-playing game set in the post-apocalyptic Fallout universe. Developed by Micro Forté and published by 14 Degrees East, Fallout Tactics was released on 15 March 2001 for Microsoft Windows. It had sold over 300,000 units worldwide by 2008.

The game follows a squad of the Brotherhood of Steel as it becomes engaged in a desperate war. Although the game takes place in the Fallout universe, it does not follow or continue the story of either Fallout or Fallout 2. Fallout Tactics shipped with a bonus CD when it was pre-ordered. The bonus CD included Fallout: Warfare, a table-top miniatures game based on the Fallout universe, as well as a bonus mission for the main game.

In 2020, Emil Pagliarulo stated that elements and lore from Fallout Tactics have been used in Bethesda Softworks' subsequent entries in the series. A timeline of the series posted by him in 2024 lists the game as happening in 2197.

== Gameplay ==
A squad uses high ground to attack deathclaws and human Beastlords.

Unlike the previous two Fallout games, Fallout Tactics emphasizes tactical combat and strategy over role-playing. Players have much more limited interactions with non-player characters, but they can still trade with them, and some missions include dialogue. Instead of towns, Fallout Tactics centers around Brotherhood bunkers and missions. The bunkers serve as a central point for the Brotherhood, and players can obtain the services of quartermasters, mechanics, personnel yeomen, and medics. Characters from completed missions occasionally visit the bunkers.

After receiving a mission briefing from the general in charge of the bunker, the player's squad can then move to the area where the mission will take place. Although this is usually a town, it can also be a factory, military encampment, or a Vault. There, the player is given a map of the area marked with objectives and notes.

Combat in Fallout Tactics is more complicated than in the previous two Fallout games. Unlike those, which featured an individual turn-based system, Fallout Tactics features three modes of combat: Continuous Turn-Based (CTB), Individual Turn-Based (ITB), and Squad Turn-Based (STB). In CTB, everyone can act at the same time, and action points are regenerated at a rate based on Agility. ITB is the system used in the original games. STB is a variation of that; each turn is given to a squad. Other changes include the ability to change stance, modifiers for height, and setting sentry modes, which let characters shoot automatically in CTB upon encountering an enemy.

Fallout Tactics is the first Fallout game to feature a multiplayer mode. In this mode, each player controls a squad of characters and faces off against opposing players. During game setup, players are granted a number of points with which to purchase squad members and gear.

Although the main character in the singleplayer campaign can only be human, recruits from the Brotherhood and characters in multiplayer matches can be of any of the six races featured in the game:

- Humans: Humans are the most common race on the wastelands. They do not excel in any particular area, but they do not suffer in any areas either. Humans gain perks every three levels.
- Super Mutants: Modified by the Forced Evolutionary Virus, super mutants are hulking beasts that are excellent at combat but lacking in intelligence and agility. Unfortunately, they can't use small weapons such as pistols or rifles. Super Mutants gain perks every four levels.
- Ghouls: Ghouls are humans who have mutated due to the radiation of the wastes and have extremely long lifespans. Although not as strong as humans, ghouls are luckier and more perceptive. They gain perks every four levels.
- Deathclaws: Deathclaws are massive beasts that use their bodies' size and strength to tear their enemies apart. Although lacking in intelligence and charisma, the bodies of deathclaws are far more durable than humans. They gain a perk every four levels.
- Dogs: Dogs are canines that have adapted to life in the Wastelands. Their main strengths are perception and agility, but they cannot use weapons or other tools. Dogs gain perks every two levels.
- Humanoid Robots: Robots are machines created to fight. Although they always have an average amount of luck and no Charisma, Robots are strong and tough, resistant to most attacks, and immune to poison and radiation. Robots never gain perks.

== Plot ==
With nuclear apocalypse looming over the world, several vaults were constructed to contain the best and brightest of humanity. By being shielded from the imminent death, the offspring of these people could reclaim and repopulate the Earth. One of these vaults located in California emerged from the war determined to restore civilization. Using their superior weapons, they were able to reclaim the surrounding wasteland. The members of this vault formed the Brotherhood of Steel, an organization dedicated to restoring civilization and reclaiming or developing new and better technologies.

A split soon formed in the Brotherhood, however. One faction supported allowing tribals (human outsiders) to join the organization to prevent a lack of troops. The other faction wanted to keep the Brotherhood pure and not accept outsiders. The faction against expansion won out, and the other faction was sent across the mountains on great airships to destroy the remnants of the mutant army defeated in the first Fallout game. A lightning storm struck down the ships, however, and they were dispersed and forced to crash-land. One of the surviving airships crashed near the ruins of post-war Chicago. After regrouping, and free from the Brotherhood members in California who wanted nothing to do with the tribals, the crash survivors established a first base near Chicago and founded a new Brotherhood that would grow and expand by recruiting outsiders and expanding across the land.

When the game starts in 2197, the Brotherhood is trying to claim territory surrounding Chicago. By offering protection to villages of tribals, the Brotherhood is able to draft recruits from among the tribals. At the beginning of the game, the player character is an Initiate, a new recruit to the Brotherhood, tasked to lead a squad of soldiers made up of available initiates. Raiders in the area are the first challenge to the Brotherhood's authority, so the player's squad of initiates is dispatched to kill the bandit leaders and mop up the bandit threat. As the campaign against the raiders succeeds in dispersing them into the wasteland, the player character is accepted fully into the Brotherhood, and learns the eventual goal of the Brotherhood — a campaign west across the Great Plains towards the Rocky Mountains in search of Vault Zero, the one-time nucleus and command center of the pre-war Vault network, where the most senior government, scientific, systematic and military leaders were housed, and the highest technology available was maintained.

The next challenge in the Brotherhood's campaign are the Beastlords, humans who are able to control the animals of the wastes, and who have come to use Deathclaws as their servants. Once again, the Brotherhood fights the menace, and once again the Brotherhood emerges victorious. Before the Brotherhood can rest, however, they encounter a new foe as they push into post-war Missouri, an area known as "the Belt": the remnants of the mutant army they were sent to destroy. The initial battles are costly to the Brotherhood. Outgunned and outmanned, the Brotherhood is overwhelmed outside of St. Louis. There General Barnaky, head of the Brotherhood, is captured by the Toccomata, leader of the mutant army. Although the Brotherhood is able to withdraw, they remain under constant attack. A squad dispatched to destroy a munitions manufacturing plant instead finds a laboratory dedicated to curing mutant sterility. The Brotherhood claims the lab in order to use it as a future bargaining chip. A few days later, at the ghoul town of Gravestone, in the ruins of Kansas City, Brotherhood scouts find an intact nuclear bomb. The Brotherhood defends the town from several mutant encroachments, and they are soon able to remove the weapon to a safe bunker.

Brotherhood scouting reveals the base of the mutants to be at Osceolla, near the ruins of one of the wrecked Brotherhood zeppelins. A squad fights its way into the base. Inside, they find Toccomata, who is dying. He reveals that General Barnaky had been lost to an unknown menace from the west that was too powerful for even the mutant army. As the squad enters the room where the mutant leader was hiding, they find Paladin Latham, one of the leaders of the Brotherhood air convoy. He tells the squad that after crashing, he fought Gammorin in hand-to-hand combat for leadership of the mutants. Latham won, but a head injury from the battle became infected, and he soon became delusional. Latham assumed the identity of Gammorin, and led his new army against his old allies. The squad kills Latham before he can endanger the Brotherhood even more.

Soon, the menace from the west reveals itself: a robot army is sweeping across the American Midwest. The reavers, a cult dedicated to technology worship, is caught between the Brotherhood and the robots as the two armies clash in Kansas. Although the Reavers try to wage a two-fronted war, they are soon beaten, and seek sanctuary among the Brotherhood in exchange for an electromagnetic pulse weapon. The Brotherhood agrees, and a squad armed with the new technology destroys a robot repair plant as they push into Colorado, towards Vault Zero. It is revealed that the robots are originating from Vault Zero, and are being directed by an enigmatic enemy known as the Calculator. Evidence uncovered by the Brotherhood points to a catastrophic experiment in the Vault that created the Calculator from a fusion of computers and human brains. The robots regroup, but the Brotherhood is able to use the momentum to destroy a robot manufacturing plant. The robots disrupt this plan when they capture Bartholemew Kerr, a merchant who had roamed among the Brotherhood bunkers. If the robots could gain this information from him, they would be able to destroy the Brotherhood. The squad arrives in time, however, and they put an end to the merchant's life. While there, they also discover the body of General Barnaky-with his brain missing.

As the robots press hard, the Brotherhood creates a plan to destroy the robots at their base, Vault Zero, located in the underground Cheyenne Mountain Complex. Using the captured nuclear warhead, the Brotherhood hopes to blast an entrance into the vault. After a tough fight up the slopes of Cheyenne Mountain, a Brotherhood squad places the warhead. The explosion does its job, and two squads enter into the bunker. The power was disabled by the blast, however, one of the squads must find the auxiliary power so the elevators can be used. Meanwhile, the robots are attacking the Brotherhood's bunker. At the vault, the power is soon back on, and the squad proceeds to the bottom level. There they encounter the last of the robot army, led by a cyborg General Barnaky. The General does not attack, however, when he is reminded of his promise to make the world safe for his wife, Maria (the player must have Maria's photo in their inventory for this to occur, or Barnaky will attack). The squad then makes it to the Calculator. After defeating the last robots that guard the bunker and destroying the brains that kept the Calculator alive, the squad is asked by the Calculator to join minds with it in order to end the war and bring peace to the world. The squad is given the choice to either allow the Calculator to self-destruct, sacrifice a member of the squad as a brain donor to repair it, or allow General Barnaky (if he has been kept alive) to become the donor.

- Allowing the Calculator to self-destruct allows the Brotherhood to capture Vault Zero and use it as its primary base of operations. However, the Calculator was in fact the most valuable asset the Vault housed-without its databanks, the vault is just another cache of old technology, not a new industrial resource.
- Repairing the Calculator with a character's brain means the Vault's resources are fully available to the Brotherhood, increasing its power exponentially. The Midwest will be restored to its former glory in decades, if not centuries. However, that character's ethics now guide the Calculator's actions.
- If the character in question had committed unethical acts throughout the game, the new Calculator outlaws discrimination against mutated species (mutants, ghouls, deathclaws and humans) in the name of expediency. For the same reason, it has the Brotherhood's elders quietly assassinated and takes control, planning a similar fate for the Brotherhood in California.
- If Barnaky becomes the donor, the new Calculator will start a campaign of genocide against all "unpure" humans, eventually driving them into extinction.
- However, if the person in question acted with distinction, discrimination is still outlawed, but no harmful acts are committed. This is a difficult feat, as the Calculator's former brains are considered innocent (so "killing" them causes a karma loss), but they can still be "killed" indirectly, for example through explosion splash damage, as long as they are not directly attacked.

== Development ==
Fallout Tactics drew from Final Fantasy Tactics for inspiration. The game was developed in 18 months.

== Release and reception ==
Reception

Aggregate score
Aggregator	Score
Metacritic	82/100

Review scores
Publication	Score
Computer Games Magazine	3.5/5
GameSpot	8.3/10
GameSpy	89/100
IGN	8.3/10
Next Generation	4/5
PC Gamer (US)	85%

Fallout Tactics was released on March 15, 2001. Physical copies included a bonus disc with printable files for the miniature wargame Fallout: Warfare, such as the board and the ruleset. In the United States, Fallout Tactics debuted at No. 10 on NPD Intelect's computer game sales rankings for March 11–17. It rose to fourth place the following week, but was absent from NPD's top 10 in its third week. According to the Australian Centre for the Moving Image, Fallout Tactics has sold over 300,000 copies.

Fallout Tactics was well received and scored generally favorable reviews according to review aggregator Metacritic. PC Gamer gave it a score of 85%. The upgraded combat system was often applauded, even if the computer AI would typically not react until shot at by the human player. The major criticisms of Fallout Tactics were its linearity compared to previous Fallout games and its emphasis on combat over open-ended role-playing. Several bugs involving vehicles in the game were never fixed. John Lee reviewed the PC version of the game for Next Generation, rating it four stars out of five, stating it was "[a] treat for Fallout and strategy fans alike."

Fallout Tactics was a nominee for Computer Gaming World's 2001 "Best Strategy Game" award, which ultimately went to Kohan: Immortal Sovereigns. The editors wrote, "Fallout Tactics charmed many an editor in the office, fusing the best parts of Fallout with the tactical savvy of a Jagged Alliance or an X-COM."

=== Retrospective commentary ===
Fallout Tactics is often ranked by journalists as one of the weaker games in the Fallout series. (Note: Attributed to multiple references:) Compared to the mainline entries, journalists have noted Fallout Tactics's emphasis on linear design and tactical gameplay alienated casual fans of the series. Jordan Forward of PCGamesN went as far as to describe it as "the black sheep of the series". Forward argues however that despite its reputation within the fandom, Fallout Tactics deserves a sequel. Turn-based games experienced a resurgence in popularity during the 2010s, as indicated by the success of games like Divinity: Original Sin II, Mario + Rabbids Kingdom Battle, and XCOM: Enemy Unknown. As a result, Forward believes a sequel would be commercially viable, so long as the developers place a greater emphasis on the role-playing elements, such as decisions the player can make that would affect the rest of the story.

The tepid reception toward Fallout Tactics and its successor Fallout: Brotherhood of Steel, as well as the cancellation of the Van Buren project, led to the stagnation of the Fallout series in the mid 2000s. In October 2004 Bethesda Softworks purchased the rights to develop Fallout 3 from Interplay for $1,175,000 minimum guaranteed advance against royalties. Fallout 3 was released in 2008, and revitalized interest in the series. It was well received by critics, and sold more than 5 million copies in its first year. In a pre-release interview, executive producer Todd Howard noted that Bethesda sought to avoid making any connections to the spin-off games. "For our purposes, neither Fallout Tactics nor Fallout: Brotherhood of Steel happened." said Howard.

== Canceled sequel ==
A sequel, titled Fallout Tactics: Brotherhood of Steel 2 was briefly in preproduction until its cancellation in 2001. It would have been set in the Deep South, and the plot revolved around a device known as the Garden of Eden Creation Kit, which contains amenities to reestablish civilization after the nuclear war. Some enemies would have been intelligent plants and mutated crocodiles. Micro Forté was again contracted to work on the sequel, and according to developer Ed Orman, the game would have featured 3D graphics and an isometric perspective. Micro Forté wanted to further emphasize the combat gameplay, simplify the in-game economy, and expand on the multiplayer mode. Fallout Tactics did not sell as well as Interplay had hoped, and only a few months after its release, the sequel was canceled. Micro Forté was then subjected to layoffs.
