= Frank Horrigan =

Frank Horrigan may refer to:

- Frank Horrigan, main character in the 1993 film In the Line of Fire, portrayed by actor Clint Eastwood
- Frank Horrigan (Fallout), character in the computer game, Fallout 2 and a reference to the above character
