= California Republic (disambiguation) =

California Republic, or Bear Flag Republic, was the period of revolt against Mexico initially proclaimed by a handful of American settlers in Mexican California on June 14, 1846.

California Republic may also refer to:

- The modern State of California in the United States.
- California Republic (mixtape), 2012 mixtape by Game
- New California Republic, a fictional government from the Fallout series
