= Enclave (Fallout) =

Fictional faction from the Fallout video game franchise

The Enclave
- Fallout organization
- Seal of the Enclave
- First appearance: Fallout 2 (1998)
- Genre: Role-playing video game

In-universe information
- Type: Military
- Location: United States
- Purpose: A restoration of the pre-war structure of the United States.

The Enclave is a quasi-state from the post-apocalyptic Fallout franchise. The Enclave has branches in the American southwest and greater Washington. It serves as a paramilitary organization founded by high-ranking US government officials attempting to restore said government, which has become a military dictatorship in the Fallout universe.

Their debut appearance in Fallout 2 (1998) and return in Fallout 3 (2008) depict them attempting to restore their power via eugenics and genocide through military force, a practice that continues to be a staple of the faction in their appearances since.

== Concept and creation ==
Series creator Tim Cain says that although he does not remember who thought of the Enclave, they were explicitly inspired by The X Files (1993), which was running during the creation of Fallout 2. This inspiration informed the faction’s portrayal as a secretive, conspiratorial remnant of the pre‑war government. He originally envisioned them as neither good nor bad, with the player ultimately deciding themselves whether they thought the group should continue to exist.

The members of the Enclave are influential figures, such as presidents, politicians, military officers, scientists, and others, who were already active before the war. After the war, they believe they are the rightful heirs to the United States government. Within the Enclave’s ideology, only "pure" people should live in the Wasteland, those who have not been affected by radiation or mutated in the Wasteland. Their ultimate goal is to restore the old pre-war order under their command.

Because of these beliefs and their rigid hierarchical structure, other factions frequently describe the Enclave as a fascist organization.

== Technology and identity ==
In the television adaptation, a customized Pip-Boy from the Enclave is revealed.

The Deathclaws were created by the Enclave together with the US government, with also having the technology to transmit radio messages over long distances. The Enclave is shown in the television series to have direct contact with all pre-war Vault-Tec vaults and is suggested to have been involved with the creation of the Super Mutants.

Despite hating all beings mutated or exposed to radiation, the Enclave kept USSS agent Frank Horrigan among its ranks. Horrigan mutated after being exposed to FEV. The Enclave used him for experimentation for decades until they deployed him as an operative, providing him with an armor and weapons. He is considered the strongest Super Mutant.

== Appearances ==
Flag of the Enclave, a modified version of the Betsy Ross Flag

Their first appearance in the franchise was in Fallout 2, in which the group is attempting to "purify" the wasteland by introducing a modified form of the FEV into the water supply, effectively enacting a genocide against all people with traces of radiation exposure, including human wastelanders as well as ghouls and Super Mutants.

Symbol of Sigma Squad

Following ZeniMax Media's acquisition of the Fallout IP, the Enclave reappeared in Fallout 3, portrayed as a separate branch operating out of Washington, D.C. This branch has a similar goal, to inject an in-progress water purifier with a modified form of FEV to kill all wastelanders with traces of radiation exposure. The player is given a chance to side with them by carrying out this plan and poisoning the purifier.

Fallout: New Vegas (2010), developed by a team at Obsidian that overlapped with the staff of Fallout 2, featured the Enclave as a minor faction called the remnants, a group of six former members of the western branch featured in Fallout 2. They can be recruited to fight at the final stage of the game, the Battle of Hoover Dam, for either the New California Republic (NCR) or Caesar's Legion. A group of modders greatly expanded on the Enclave in 2014, making them a playable faction.

As part of Fallout 4 (2015)'s next-gen update released in 2024, a free Creation Club addon featuring the east coast Enclave was released. This features a small questline with Enclave members as enemies, described in-game as remnants. These enemies are unrelated to Fallout: New Vegas' Enclave remnants, instead originating from Fallout 3's Enclave. In addition, a semi-canon mod known as "America Rising 2" implements a full Enclave quest line and endings in Fallout 4, in an alternate timeline where the Enclave won in Fallout 3. This mod was published to GOG.com alongside Fallout London as part of their modding service.

They later appeared in Fallout 76 (2018), taking place 59 years before the original Fallout (1997). They appear as a defunct branch operating out of the Appalachian wasteland entirely by robots, including its leader, the computer MODUS. They are in an inoperable state until the player first encounters them, where they are tasked to complete MODUS' mission.

=== TV series ===
In Amazon MGM Studios' Fallout (2024), a live action series taking place in the Fallout universe, features the Enclave. In the first season, an Enclave scientist, Dr. Siggi Wilzig (Michael Emerson), escapes from an Enclave facility of unknown allegiance. Wilzig carries with him the cold fusion technology, which he intends to give to Lee Moldaver (Sarita Choudhury) of the New California Republic (NCR). In Filly, Wilzig encounters Lucy Maclean (Ella Purnell), and they flee together after a battle. Severely wounded, Wilzig tells Lucy to cut off his head, which she does.

In the second season, in 2077, Wilzig reminds Barb Howard (Frances Turner) that she cannot back down on the bomb launch or she will be replaced, as the nuclear war is inevitable. Cooper Howard (Walton Goggins), hoping to avert nuclear war, hands over cold fusion to the President of the United States (Clancy Brown), secretly part of the Enclave. In 2296, Howard, seriously wounded, is saved by a Super Mutant (Ron Perlman) who proposes that he join the war that his race will wage against the Enclave, but Howard declines his offer and the Super Mutant leaves him elsewhere. Hank MacLean (Kyle MacLachlan) confesses to his daughter Lucy that he has been working for the Enclave all this time and that the Wasteland is the true experiment. At Vault-Tec's Vault 32, Overseer Stephanie Harper (Annabel O'Hagan), contacts the Enclave to initiate Phase 2.

== Reception ==
The Enclave was considered by Screen Rant as the most evil faction in the Fallout universe.
