= Brotherhood of Steel =

Fictional organization in the Fallout franchise

- Fallout organization
- Insignia of the Western Brotherhood of Steel, its founding chapter
- First appearance: Fallout (1997)
- Created by: R. Scott Campbell
- Genre: Role-playing video game

In-universe information
- Type: Quasi-religious paramilitary organization
- Founded: October 20, 2077 (de facto), 2082 (de jure)
- Location: United States
- Technologies: Power Armor

The Brotherhood of Steel (often abbreviated to BoS) is a fictional organization from Fallout, a post-apocalyptic video game and TV series franchise. Descended from a secessionist group of United States Armed Forces soldiers, the Brotherhood collects and preserves advanced pre-war technology. However, they are not generally known for sharing this knowledge, even if doing so would improve the quality of life among the people of the wasteland.

The Brotherhood faction has been present in every Fallout game to date.

== Structure ==
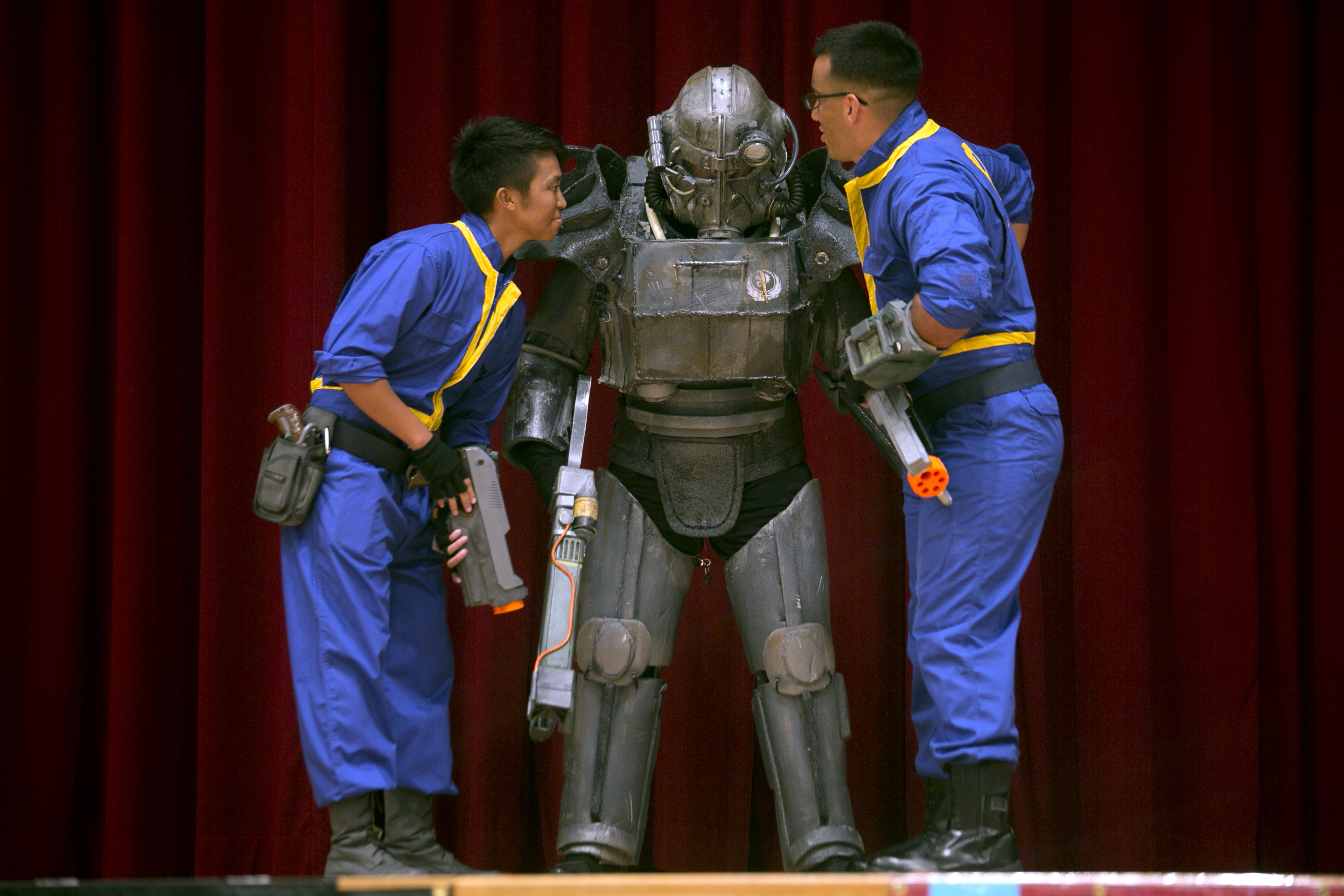
A cosplayer dressed in a Brotherhood of Steel Power Armor (center)

Due to the fragmented nature of the Brotherhood, existing in multiple Expeditionary Forces (known as "Chapters"), a set structure is hard to follow. All Chapters follow a chain of command, known as "The Chain That Binds", with six ranks used universally by all. These are, in ascending importance, Squire, Initiate, Knight, Paladin, Sentinel, and Elder.

All Chapters stem from the original Western Brotherhood seen in Fallout: A Post Nuclear Role Playing Game, and usually take on names relating to their location, such as the Appalachian Brotherhood (Fallout 76), Mojave Chapter (Fallout: New Vegas), and the Eastern Brotherhood (Fallout 3 and Fallout 4).

Within each chapter, two groups exist: Scribes and Paladins. Scribes are the non-combatant medical officers, scientists and engineers, responsible for all logistical matters within each chapter and are subdivided into different "orders". Members of the Order of Swords are responsible for the maintenance of advanced weaponry and power armor. The Order of Shields are responsible for reverse engineering civilian technology for medical and defensive purposes. The Order of Scrolls are responsible for intelligence gathering and the recovery and acquisition of advanced schematics and pre-war knowledge in the form of books and other media. Paladins are the combatant "armed forces" of the Brotherhood and are the main users of power armor and advanced energy weaponry. These members are the main components of the teams which recover old world high technology, as well as the members who combat threats to the Brotherhood (such as mutants, the Enclave, and the New California Republic (NCR)). Brotherhood paladins traditionally are the members which can ascend to the rank of elder in a chapter, although certain scribes have been known to become elders, such as in Elder Elijah's case.

The Brotherhood have been shown to have an internal affairs division, known as the Circle of Steel. At least one member (Christine) is known to have been sent after a rogue Elder (Elijah) in the Fallout: New Vegas add-ons Old World Blues and Dead Money.

== Development ==
The Brotherhood was created by R. Scott Campbell, who stated that he "simply wanted a group exactly like the monks from the Guardian Citadel in Wasteland". He stated that he "really wanted the player to be able to befriend and join up with this group (and grab all of their awesome gear, of course)". He added that while "this did make them similar to concepts in Gamma World and Warhammer 40K", he "just loved the idea of high-tech knights in power-armor", calling their creation "total fan service to me".

== Appearances ==
The Brotherhood of Steel made its first appearance in the original Fallout video game and has been present in every entry in the series since. It is also the central faction of two spin-off titles, Fallout Tactics: Brotherhood of Steel and Fallout: Brotherhood of Steel.

The depictions of the Brotherhood have greatly varied. They are first shown to be an enigmatic, militaristic cult that the protagonist may join in Fallout, who can be critical to defeating the Master, the main antagonist. There their "high elder" and leader is John Maxson, grandson of founder Roger Maxson, a former United States Army Captain who declared a defection and secession from the Union once they found out their base was being used for human experimentation regarding a deadly virus, and once the world was ravaged by the Great War, hid along with his troops in a Lost Hills bunker that became the current Brotherhood headquarters. The Brotherhood has a different appearance in Fallout 2, where they are shown to have outposts throughout the wasteland and are in cooperation with the NCR.

In Fallout 3, the East Coast Brotherhood of Steel were portrayed as an altruistic organization dedicated to protecting the wastelanders from raiders and super mutants. The diversion in ideology has caused a splinter group to emerge called the Brotherhood Outcasts, who have no interest in assisting wastelanders but instead pursuing the Brotherhood's original mission of confiscating pre-War technology. If the player character chooses to assist Lyons, the Brotherhood faction soon becomes a dominant power in the region with much of the population appreciating its assistance, such as in operating a massive water filtration project to make the region's water supply safely drinkable.

Other chapters, like the Mojave chapter in New Vegas, remained isolationist and were chiefly focused on obtaining pre-War technologies and often used extreme measures to obtain them, such as terrorizing wastelanders and even becoming embroiled in a war with the New California Republic before the events of the game. The war with the NCR left the chapter very weakened, with around half of their paladins and knights lost after the NCR invaded the Mojave chapter's original headquarters in a decisive victory. Depending on the player character's actions in New Vegas, the Mojave Brotherhood chapter can maintain the status quo, make peace with the NCR, or be destroyed.

By the time Arthur Maxson succeeded Owen Lyons as Elder of the Eastern chapter during the events of Fallout 4, the Brotherhood had reverted to their original mission of confiscating and reverse engineering lost pre-war technology, reunified with the Outcasts, and re-established contact with their superiors on the West Coast. The Brotherhood are one of the pivotal factions in Fallout 4, and players may choose to either side with them or join another faction to eliminate the Brotherhood in order to progress the narrative of the game's main storyline.

The Brotherhood are heavily featured in the Steel Dawn update to Fallout 76, as part of an expansion pack called Fractured Steel. In that game, it is led by Paladin Leila Rahmani, who arrived from California with her troops to establish a new Appalachian chapter.

A main character of the 2024 television adaptation Fallout, Maximus, is depicted as a squire in the Brotherhood's West Coast chapter. After being mistreated by his knight, Titus, he refuses to save the knight's life following a Yao Guai attack, stealing the power armor and assuming his identity. Maximus, in the guise of Titus, is later sent his own squire, Thaddeus, who discovers his real identity and steals his power armor fusion core.

== Promotion and reception ==
A Brotherhood of Steel member clad in Power Armor is featured as part of a range of Fallout-themed Funko Pop figurines which were first released in 2015.

Brendan Lowry of Windows Central called the Brotherhood's quest line in Fallout 4 morally grey, saying that while "The Minutemen are the "good guys" [...] and the Institute are unquestionably evil", "the Brotherhood is the only faction [...] that makes you critically think." Saying that "when the Brotherhood arrives in the Commonwealth, they make a promise to defend the people living there", things start to change later, and the Brotherhood "shows its enemies no mercy" regardless of whether they are hostile. Lowry states that "there's a strong argument to be made both for and against the Brotherhood's ideology".

Controversy arose among fans due to a retcon of the Brotherhood in the plot of Fallout 76. Despite established Fallout lore stating that "first recorded activity from the Brotherhood of Steel was in California in the year 2134," Fallout 76 establishes a Brotherhood presence "in West Virginia in the year 2102", something that "should be downright implausible if not impossible". Bethesda explained this discrepancy with the use of a "functioning satellite" that allowed the Brotherhood of Steel to extend their reach to Appalachia.

== See also ==
- Space marine – Type of soldier in military science fiction
