= Annabel O'Hagan =

American actress (born 1997)

- O'Hagan in 2026
- Born: May 7, 1997 (age 29)
- Education: Harvard University
- Occupation: Actress
- Years active: 2020–present

Annabel O'Hagan (born May 7, 1997) is an American actress. She is best known for her role as Stephanie Harper in the Amazon Prime Video post-apocalyptic drama series Fallout (2024–present). She has appeared in films and in an episode of the series Law & Order: Special Victims Unit (2020).

== Early life ==
O'Hagan was born on May 7, 1997. She grew up in Richmond, Virginia. She graduated from St. Catherine's School in 2015. She partook in the Bal du Bois in June 2017, and attended Harvard University, earning both degrees in psychology and theatre studies in 2019. O'Hagan "fell in love with acting" while a student at Harvard, participating in about three productions per semester. In September 2018, she was one of the first six women to join the cast of the theatrical society Hasty Pudding Theatricals after it ended its policy of only casting men; she said she "look[ed] forward to fighting back at the stereotype that women can't be funny".

== Career ==
After graduating from Harvard, O'Hagan moved to New York City in 2019 to pursue her acting career; she soon met her manager, Myrna Jacoby. O'Hagan made her screen acting debut in the twenty-first season of Law & Order: Special Victims Unit as Dehlia. O'Hagan guest starred in Dear Edward in 2023, and appeared in the comedy-drama film Rent Free with her friends in 2024.

In 2022, O'Hagan was requested to audition for the Amazon Prime Video post-apocalyptic drama series Fallout; she was notified that she was successful while on holiday in Italy, and rushed home to begin working within days. She was cast as Stephanie Harper, a pregnant Vault 33 resident, debuting in the first season in 2024. She was promoted to a series regular for the third season in May 2026, and is set to appear in The 99'ers as Carla Overbeck.

== Filmography ==
Key
†	Denotes films that have not yet been released

Year	Title	Role	Notes
2020	Law & Order: Special Victims Unit	Dehlia	Episode: "Dance, Lies and Videotape"
2021	A Journal for Jordan	Waitress	Feature film
2022	Half	Kate	Short film
2023	Dear Edward	Harper	Episode: "Chrysalis"
2023	Knowing Me, Knowing You		Short film
2024	Rent Free	Lindsay	Feature film
2024–present	Fallout	Stephanie Harper	Recurring role (seasons 1–2); main role (season 3)
2026	The Door	Sierra Ashgrove	Short film
2026	Into the Sky †	TBA	Feature film
TBA	The 99'ers †	Carla Overbeck	Feature film
