= New California Republic =

Fictional republic

- Fallout organization
- Flag of the New California Republic
- First appearance: Fallout 2 (1998)
- Genre: Role-playing video game

In-universe information
- Type: Federal presidential republic
- Founded: 2189
- Location: Western United States; Baja California peninsula

The New California Republic (NCR) is a fictional post-apocalyptic federal republic in the Fallout franchise. Initially mentioned in an ending for Fallout (1997), the NCR were first formally depicted in Fallout 2 (1998) as a technologically advanced and expansionist nation. The republic later reappeared as a major role in the plot of Fallout: New Vegas (2010), and served as a key story element in both seasons of the 2024 Fallout television series.

As an attempting governing body modeled after the pre-war United States government, the New California Republic aim to rebuild society after its collapse following a nuclear holocaust. After being formed out of the village of Shady Sands in 2189, the NCR quickly became one of the largest governmental and economic powers in North America since the Great War. Though primarily operating out of Southern California, the nation's territory extends into the former states of Oregon and Nevada, along with further colonization efforts in Arizona and the Baja California peninsula of Mexico.

== Development ==
The NCR were intended to feature in the unfinished Van Buren, the codename for the original Fallout 3, developed by Black Isle Studios. Within the game, the NCR were to be involved in conflicts against the Brotherhood of Steel and a "merchant mafia", as well as be involved in the origin of the antagonist Victor Presper. Many concepts from Van Buren were eventually repurposed for Obsidian Entertainment's Fallout: New Vegas, with developer Chris Avellone stating that the "NCR in Van Buren was very much like it was in New Vegas in the sense it was trying to rebuild," and that many concepts from the game were considered to be expanded upon within an expected sequel to New Vegas.

When working on the NCR's appearance in New Vegas, Josh Sawyer intentionally added both morally virtuous and intentionally malicious characters as members of the republic into the game, aiming to avoid "painting too simple of a picture for the player and their decision making," further stating that the diversity properly represented a democracy. When comparing the NCR and their adversary, Caesar's Legion, Avellone stated that "in many respects, NCR isn’t better than the Legion, and while the Legion has plenty of bad qualities, it's not cartoon bad: it's got some elements about it that NCR could stand to pay attention to." Avellone has also vocally expressed worry about the NCR growing too large and "making things too civilized" within the franchise, and chose to allow the player to release a nuclear weapon onto the faction in New Vegas' DLC Lonesome Road, intending to allow the player to destabilize and "shake up" the faction.

When explaining the choice to destroy the NCR's capital of Shady Sands with a nuclear weapon in the Fallout television series, showrunner Graham Wagner stated: "I think it would have been a mistake to go from the retro-futuristic America to another America that has been fully civilised and the NCR is doing everything great," comparing the state of the NCR to the end of the wild west. During the creation of Fallout season 2, which takes after the events of New Vegas, showrunners Wagner and Geneva Robertson-Dwore decided to a take a "fog of war" approach to confirming the ending of New Vegas, in which the player decides the fate of the NCR's control of Hoover Dam.

== Structure ==
The New California Republic is a federal republic with the primary goal of reestablishing a formal governing body for the wasteland; it has a professional military, a system of elected government and collects taxes from trade routes. With a population of over 700,000, the republic is divided into the five states of Dayglow, Hub, Los Angeles, Maxson, and Shady, all of which located in southern California, and has multiple territorial holdings in northern California and the former states of Oregon and Nevada, with efforts to colonize Arizona and the former Mexican state of Baja California.

As a democracy, the faction models its government after that of the United States, however does not strictly follow its practices. For example, the NCR president is not elected by the people, but rather chosen through the elected members of the senate, nor does the position feature term limits, leading to instances such as President Tandi serving 52 consecutive years in office. The republic struggles with corruption, for example, a law was lifted which prevented cattle barons from holding strong political power. The NCR prints its own paper currency and mints its own coinage which is primarily backed by gold, although the value of its currency had rapidly fallen after attacks on the republic's gold reserves. Operating out of military installations in locations such as McCarran International Airport, one of the most notable branches of the faction's army is the New California Republic rangers. Consisting of former anti-slaver fighters, the NCR rangers serve as commandos, spies and border control agents, utilizing armor sourced from pre-war riot gear.

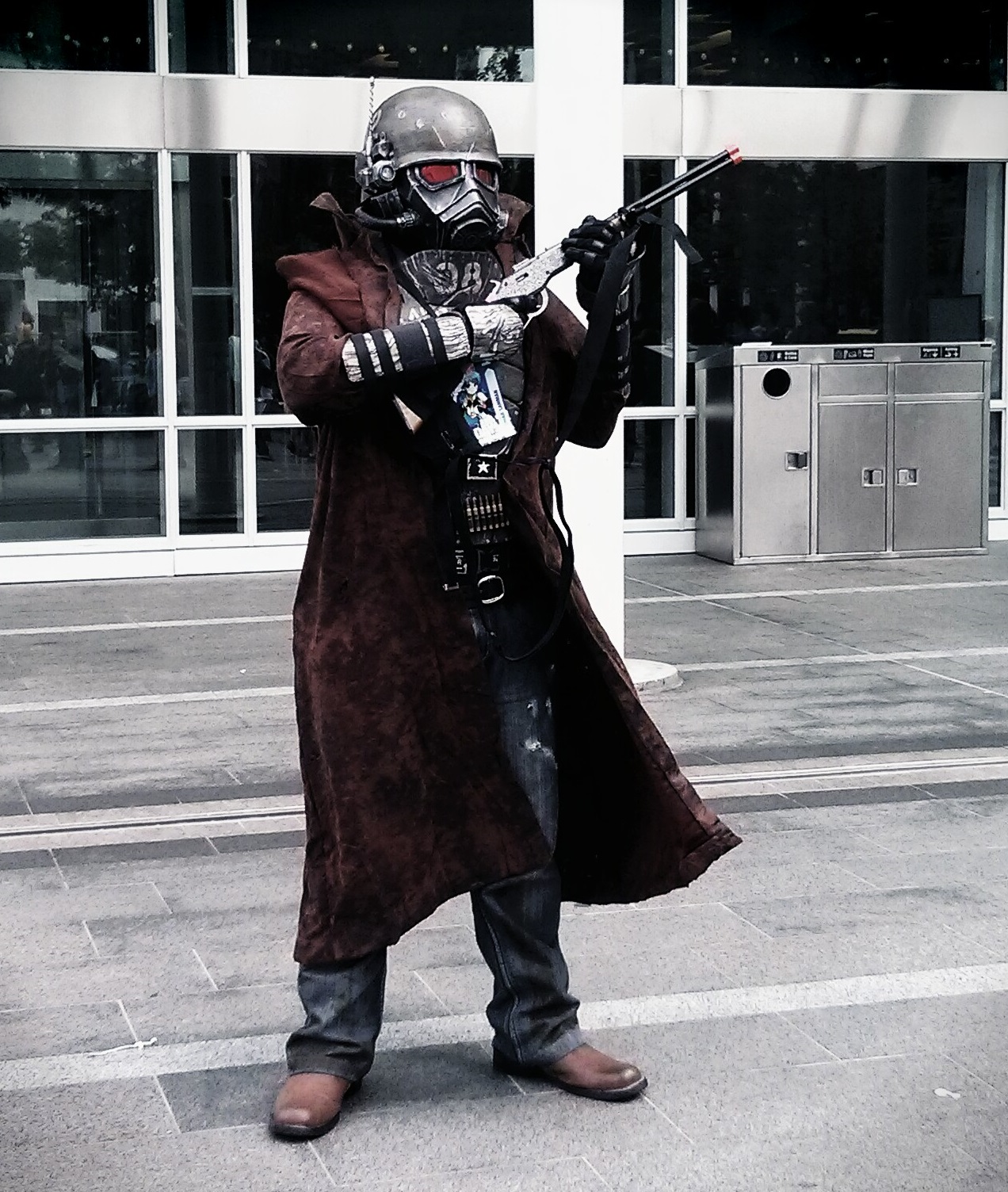
A cosplayer dressed up as a New California Republic veteran ranger.

The NCR have been able to rebuild advanced infrastructure throughout its territory, some of which nearly recreating pre-war civilization. For example, the nation's capital of Shady Sands, which houses a population of over 30,000, is depicted as having power grids, public transportation, a Hall of Congress, public markets and public utilities such as libraries. Another city, the Boneyard, contains advanced banking systems and medical universities. The republic also has systems of trade routes, roadways and trains throughout its territory. The NCR has established civil laws, including upholding the rights of posthuman beings such as ghouls and mutants, the prohibition of gambling and prostitution, and has formal immigration and annexation policies.

== Appearances ==
=== Fallout (1997) ===
Upon leaving a fallout shelter called Vault 13, the first location the Vault Dweller comes across is Shady Sands, a post-apocalyptic village consisting of adobe-built structures and agricultural land in southern California, founded by the inhabitants of Vault 15 in 2142. The Vault Dweller canonically chooses to help the town's leader, Aradesh, by saving his daughter, Tandi, from a group of raiders. After the events of the game, Shady Sands established trade with other towns and eventually installed a pilot government in 2186, before writing a constitution and voting to form the New California Republic and its five founding states three years later in 2189, with Aradesh as the republic's first president.

=== Fallout 2 ===
In 2241, roughly eighty years after the events of Fallout, the NCR has become a powerful and technologically advanced force in southern California under President Tandi, allied with the Brotherhood of Steel, and is expanding into the lawless northern Californian wasteland. Seeking to annex the technologically advanced Vault City and the gold mining town of Redding, the NCR collaborates with the Bishop crime family of New Reno to bully Vault City into joining the NCR by covertly stealing technology and sending mercenaries to attack the city, with the goal being to force Vault City into desperation and accept NCR governance. Redding is lusted after by the NCR, Vault City, and New Reno for its gold mining, all the while engulfed in a cold war between the various resident mining companies and local medic Doc Johnson, who each want to choose which faction Redding will join, with Marge LeBarge of Kokoweef Mine voting to join the NCR. Elsewhere, the New California Rangers, an unofficial branch of NCR law enforcement with limited government support, is on a crusade to destroy slavery in northern California, particularly opposed to the Slaver's Guild.

Flag of the New California Republic in Fallout 2

The Chosen One, the main protagonist of Fallout 2 and grandchild of the Vault Dweller, can either aid the NCR's expansion northward or hamper it, fighting the NCR's enemies in the region or destabilizing the NCR's efforts. Though the player can achieve multiple different endings, the NCR canonically annexes the vast majority of northern California, and the New California Rangers reorganize into the New California Republic Rangers, an elite branch of the NCR's army. As the Enclave, the genocidal remnants of a post-War American government deep state, collapses in the region after being destroyed in a personal conflict with the Chosen One, the NCR attacks and overruns its mainland base at Camp Navarro in 2246, engaging in manhunts together with the Brotherhood of Steel to destroy survivors of the attack.

=== Fallout: New Vegas ===
After the events of Fallout 2 and under new presidential leadership, the NCR began an imperialistic eastward expansion into Nevada, setting eyes on Hoover Dam to restore it and provide the republic and its civilians with power and clean water. The NCR's expansion garnered attention of Mr. House, a pre-war businessman and technocratic ruler of the advanced post-war city of New Vegas, and Caesar's Legion, a totalitarian dictatorship modeled after the Roman Empire, led by NCR-born former researcher Edward Sallow. After negotiating and coming to agreements with Mr. House over the occupation of Hoover Dam, the NCR narrowly maintained control after Caesar's Legion attempted to take control of the dam for themselves in 2277. The NCR also engages in war against its former ally the Brotherhood of Steel and tribal group the Great Khans, effectively committing genocide against both groups.

By the events of New Vegas in 2281, the NCR are overstretched and mismanaged, but the faction now occupies a large portion of Mojave wasteland. The faction is now preparing to defend Hoover Dam once more from a regrouped Caesar's Legion, who are now attempting to take the dam once more. The player can chose to side with the NCR in taking out Mr. House, and maintaining control over Hoover Dam during a second battle over the dam with Caesar's Legion, and as a result annexing New Vegas and the Mojave wasteland into the NCR's territory. Alternatively, the player can choose side with either Mr. House and Caesar's Legion, and block the NCR from holding the dam. Upon completion of New Vegas' DLC Lonesome Road, the player is given the option to launch a nuclear weapon into NCR territory.

A New California Republic ranger challenge coin.

=== Fallout TV series ===
Starting in 2277, Shady Sands experienced a slow decline which culminated shortly after the events of New Vegas, when the NCR's capital of Shady Sands was completely destroyed by a nuclear bomb dropped by Vault-Tec employee and Enclave member Hank MacLean (Kyle MacLachlan), and the subsequent attacking of scattered and disorganized remnants of the local NCR forces by the Brotherhood of Steel. By the events of the TV series in 2296, the NCR's influence in the Los Angeles area has largely diminished. Lee Moldaver (Sarita Choudhury), an NCR leader seeking cold fusion in order to power the surrounding area, leads a raid upon Vault 33 and kidnaps MacLean, prompting his daughter, Lucy MacLean (Ella Purnell), to leave the vault to search for him.

On the surface, Lucy discovers the crater where Shady Sands once stood, alongside Maximus, a Brotherhood of Steel knight who survived the destruction of the city as a child before being taken in by the Brotherhood. Lucy and Maximus eventually find themselves in Vault 4 which is populated by survivors of the destruction of Shady Sands, and quickly discover that the inhabitants of the Vault worship Moldaver as "the Flame Mother," before being banished from the Vault. After obtaining the cold fusion and presenting it to the NCR in exchange for her father, Lucy discovers his involvement in the destruction of Shady Sands, and that her mother had raised her in the city before its destruction and refused to return to Vault 33. After an NCR loss during a battle at Griffith Observatory to the Brotherhood of Steel, MacLean escapes to New Vegas, and Moldaver dies as she repowers the Los Angeles skyline using cold fusion.

On the path to New Vegas, the NCR are depicted as largely absent from the Mojave wasteland, with only small isolated groups of military remnants remaining in the area. As Maximus uses NCR power armor to fight Deathclaws occupying New Vegas strip, the citizens of the town of Freeside cheer for the return of the NCR, before a battalion of NCR soldiers arrive to assist Maximus, as a restrengthened Caesar's Legion march towards the city.

=== Other appearances ===
The NCR are briefly mentioned in Fallout 4 through a memory sequence involving the formation of the NCR.

== Promotion and reception ==
On June 17, 2021, Bethesda released limited-edition, wearable NCR Desert Ranger helmets. The helmets, listed with a limited quantity of 500, were sold out right after they had been put up for sale. Bethesda have released flags based on major factions in the Fallout series, including the New California Republic's two-headed bear flag.

Kristine Steimer of IGN Gaming Network labelled the NCR as "bloated and ineffective at protecting its people" during her review of Fallout: New Vegas, while Dan Whitehead of Eurogamer granted that the NCR had brought "semblance of order" to the Wasteland. When writing for VG247, Kat Baily wrote that although the NCR "fight to restore order and introduce democracy to the Wasteland," that "they are bogged down by beaurocracy" and "psycho" leaders. Christopher Monfette of G4 described the NCR as "a semi-benevolent military organization attempting to both restore peace," which has come at "the cost of some hasty, uninformed military decisions that have led to a high civilian body count." Bloody Disgusting's Luiz H.C. described the faction as an "expansionist government" which falls victim to corruption and "bureaucratic red tape." Emma Martin, writing for the Brock Press, wrote that the conflict between the NCR and Caesar's Legion "mirrors our own modern debates about the fragility of democracy in the face of rising authoritarianism."

In 2017, a man cosplaying as a New California Republic veteran ranger in Grande Prairie, Alberta, Canada, was arrested after members of the public mistook him for an individual carrying a bomb. The NCR and its territory have been a source of inspiration for multiple fan modifications, most notably Fallout: New California (set in the Cajon Pass), Fallout: The Frontier (set in Portland, Oregon), and The Long 15 (set in Baker and Kelso, California).

=== Television series ===
Following the release of the Fallout series' 2024 television adaptation, the New California Republic's lore came into question by Fallout fans who discovered apparent contradictions between the timeline of events surrounding the show's sixth episode, The Trap, and events from Fallout: New Vegas, particularly the destruction of NCR's capital of Shady Sands. A further discrepancy between the city's depicted location in the series (the Los Angeles Basin) compared to Fallout and Fallout 2 was noted and caused further questioning by fans, as the city was initially depicted closer the Nevada state border. After Fallout fans questioned the faction's future, Bethesda executive producer Todd Howard responded in an interview with IGN by teasingly remarking, "I don't think you've heard the last of the New California Republic." Howard additionally noted that the NCR after all had operations beyond California, implying that the destruction of Shady Sands will not be the end for the republic. Showrunner Graham Wagner stated "I really want to caution people [that] the story [of the NCR] isn't over yet, and we really bet on that," and that "there's more to tell" with the faction. Upon being asked about the series' narrative choices regarding the NCR, New Vegas' director Josh Sawyer stated that "there are things that I might watch [in the series] and say, ‘I don’t think I would have taken this that way’, and then there are other things that I think are really cool. But it’s not my space, it was never my thing."
