= Deathclaw =

Fictional species in the Fallout franchise

- Fallout race
- An example of a Deathclaw from Fallout 4
- First appearance: Fallout (1997)
- Last appearance: Fallout (2026)
- Created by: R. Scott Campbell

In-universe information
- Distinctions: American military bioweapon, reptilian physiology

Deathclaws are a fictional bipedal reptilian species from the post-apocalyptic Fallout video game franchise. They were created by humans as biological weapons prior to the series' in-universe nuclear war. Surviving the conflict and escaping into the wild afterwards, they went on to thrive in the nuclear wasteland, becoming apex predators. While most Deathclaws have limited intelligence and function purely as deadly monsters, isolated groups were depicted as possessing sentience and human-level intelligence. This was controversial with the series' creators, leading to many such Deathclaws being purposely killed off.

Known as one of the Fallout series' most recognizable and iconic elements, Deathclaws were praised by critics for their design and the fear they induce in the player due to their immense power. As a result of their popularity, numerous mods were created for Fallout series games with the Deathclaw as a central theme, either to tame the creatures as a pet or use them in combat, concepts which were later added as an official feature.

== Background ==
Deathclaws were not created by any accidental mutation, but genetically engineered using the DNA of various animals, including the Jackson's chameleon, as a bioweapon for the American army, prior to the Great War of 2077. They were later refined by The Master and the Forced Evolutionary Virus. Bipedal, carnivorous reptiles, when fully standing, they are typically 8-12 feet tall, with rough, scaly skin, a pair of curved horns, and several humanoid features. They also have five clawed fingers with opposable thumbs. They exhibit a hunched posture, and their feet have a sickle-shaped claw similar to that of a velociraptor. Deathclaws have a fearsome reputation, as they are usually some of the strongest enemies found within the in-game universe.

After the death of The Master, the Deathclaw population increased, and different varieties evolved, diversifying gameplay. Alpha males, matriarchs, and albino Deathclaws emerged as part of a new hierarchy. A community of highly intelligent Deathclaws capable of basic speech was shown in Fallout 2, but talking Deathclaws remained a local phenomenon and were not carried over into later games, besides the mobile spin-off Shelter Online, which features Kura, a distant relative of the Fallout 2 character Goris, showing that they had been somewhat repopulated on the West Coast.

== Appearances ==
While Deathclaws normally feature as enemies since their debut appearance in the first Fallout, they have also featured as non-player characters. In Fallout 2, the player encounters Goris, a kindly, talking Deathclaw who wears a robe in an attempt to obscure his identity, in Vault 13, home of the previous game's protagonist. Goris can be recruited as a companion. Deathclaws were portrayed in a more sympathetic light in Fallout 4 - one quest involves reuniting a Deathclaw mother with her stolen egg. The Wasteland Workshop downloadable content of Fallout 4 allows the player to capture and tame Deathclaws, as well as the "Wasteland Whisperer" perk in Fallout 76, although it has been noted to suffer from glitches causing the deaths of the tamed animals.

Deathclaws were intentionally omitted from Season 1 of the Fallout television series, but were included in Season 2. Leaked set photos demonstrated a practical effects Deathclaw suit. Their live-action design, also seen in a collectible figurine, is somewhat different than the Deathclaw's in-game appearances, with a more upright posture and longer horns.

== Development ==
Deathclaws were originally conceived as a mixture of wolverine and brown bear. However, this design was rejected as having "way too much hair". The inspiration for the final design of the Deathclaws came from the Tarrasque, a Dungeons & Dragons monster. A decoration of the creature was located in the offices of Interplay when the developers of Fallout were looking for inspiration for the Deathclaw's design.

Fallout 2's talking, intelligent Deathclaws were the brainchild of designer John Deiley, who had planned for them to modify Power Armor for Deathclaw use and then assault the Enclave to steal the Forced Evolutionary Virus. He also planned for them to enter the wider world and interact with the population of the Wasteland, giving them a far larger role in future series entries. However, other developers had most of the intelligent Deathclaws killed off behind his back by Frank Horrigan, an Enclave secret service member, rendering the idea unusable. Fallout creator Timothy Cain, as well as Obsidian co-founder Chris Avellone, have called the idea of intelligent Deathclaws "too silly" and been opposed to it.

The design of Deathclaws changed slightly throughout the series. The idea of hairy Deathclaws returned for Fallout Tactics, attributed to over-enthusiasm on the part of the developers, though this was highly controversial and may have played a role in Bethesda's removal of the game's from official canon. Deathclaws were redesigned in Fallout 4 by art director Jonah Lobe, improving on their depiction in Fallout 3 with "thicker, more armored skin; shorter, strong-looking claws and hands", as well as "a bull-like redesign to the horns […] and a thicker tail". "Chameleons, alligators, bulls, panthers, serpents & lizards" were integrated into the final design.

According to Josh Sawyer, design director of New Vegas, the inclusion of Deathclaws near Goodsprings early on in the game was to teach the player that they could not simply run all over the map, and had to be careful where they went.

== Cultural impact ==
=== Critical reception ===
Author Erwan Lafleuriel called the Deathclaw Fallout's most iconic creature, describing it as "a mountain of muscle and claw that has eviscerated more than one Wasteland hero". Official Xbox Magazine stated that Deathclaws "are one of Fallout's deadliest enemies", calling them "gigantic, ferocious beasts with skin like a tank, no weak points and even less mercy," and noting that the player's gun "whittles off mere atoms of health bar". Nathan Grayson of Kotaku, in response to the idea of a Deathclaw companion, stated, "why settle for dumb old Dogmeat or sadly unromanceable Codsworth when you can roam the wasteland with a loyal Deathclaw?"

TheGamer's James Lucas argued that the talking Deathclaws should appear in the Fallout TV series, saying that it would be an interesting subversion of expectations and that making them purely monsters would be a wasted opportunity.

=== Fandom ===
Prior to the release of the Wasteland Workshop downloadable content in April 2016, fans have introduced the functionality of recruiting a Deathclaw follower or companion in Fallout 4 through unofficial modding of the game. A notable Fallout 76 fan mod, the Deathclaw Maze, is patterned after the Labyrinth from Greek mythology with the Deathclaw filling in the role of the Minotaur. Players of Fallout 76 were noted to have started an "adoption agency" to provide players with tamed animal pets, with the Deathclaw being one of the most requested and popular.

Zack Zweizen, also of Kotaku, drew attention to the large amount of pornographic Deathclaw fan art that circulates online, also noting that Lobe had mentioned on social media that he was "silently impressed/horrified" by the artwork. When further questioned by Zweizen, Lobe speculated that elements of the redesigned creature such as its powerful body, predatory gaze, lion-like eyes and "soft skin" in certain places may have added to its appeal. While saying that he did not want to criticize it and found it impressive, he nevertheless stated that it also left him "unsettled".
