= Vault-Tec =

Fictional corporation in the Fallout franchise

Vault-Tec Corporation
- Fallout organization
- Vault-Tec Logo
- First appearance: Fallout (1997)
- Created by: Tim Cain
- Genre: Role-playing video game
- Location: United States
- Purpose: Creating and running vaults
- Products: Vaults

Vault-Tec Corporation, otherwise known as Vault-Tec and sometimes called Vault-Tec Industries, is a fictional defense megacorporation from the post-apocalyptic Fallout franchise. Throughout the United States, Vault-Tec created government-funded vaults, large fallout shelters that would serve to shelter civilians and allow for the continuation of human life in the threat of a nuclear attack. Within most of these Overseer-governed vaults, Vault-Tec carried out human experiments on its residents without their consent or knowledge, ranging from being mostly harmless to disturbing and inhumane.

== Concept and design ==
Vault-Tec is a pre-war defense megacorporation responsible for creating the vaults featured throughout the Fallout series. Their purpose of conducting human experiments on its residents began as an idea by Fallout co-creator Tim Cain following the 1997 release of the first Fallout game. Despite its slogan "revolutionizing safety for an uncertain future," Vault-Tec is consistently portrayed as a corrupt, unscrupulous corporation with themes of unfettered capitalism.

=== Vaults ===
Vault-Tec created vaults throughout the United States with the help of government funding. These vaults served as large fallout shelters used to house civilians and allow for human life to continue in the potentiality of the U.S. being in immediate threat of a nuclear attack.

These vaults were Overseer-governed laboratories and psychological test chambers, each with its own premise, with Vault-Tec carrying out unethical human experiments on its residents without their consent or knowledge, which ranged from being mostly harmless to inhumane and disturbing. The true purpose of the vaults' experiments was so that Enclave could collect the data gathered from the experiments and use it to build a space ship and find a new planet for them to colonize.

In total, Vault-Tec created 122 vaults, 17 of which were "control vaults," or vaults not made for human experimenting purposes and transparently operated as advertised. Vault-Tec made revenue through selling reserved spots in these vaults. In order to market themselves, Vault-Tec made various products such as lunchboxes and bobbleheads.

== Technology and identity ==
The Pip-Boy, a wearable computer by RobCo Industries, was initially made for pre-war and vault-living use, with many of the device's settings used for inhabitants of Vault-Tec's vaults due to the Pip-Boy being issued to each dweller. The Pip-Boy's useful functionalities have also allowed for it to be used in the wasteland. Fallout 4 features two games created by Vault-Tec that are playable on a Pip-Boy, one of which, titled Red Menace, being a propaganda game against China.

Vault-Tec created V.A.T.S., or the Vault-Tec Assisted Targeting System, a special combat system introduced in Fallout 3 and featured throughout the series. The combat system allows for the player to target the specific limb of an enemy based on chance. Fallout 76 features technology created by Vault-Tec such as portable C.A.M.P.S. (Construction and Assembly Mobile Platform) and G.E.C.K. (Garden of Eden Creation Kit) devices.

Vault-Tec's identity is highly represented by Vault Boy, the corporation mascot.

== Appearances ==
The first of Vault-Tec's creations appeared in the first Fallout game, where the player originates from Vault 13, one of many created by Vault-Tec. Although Vault-Tec's concept of conducting human experiments was not yet developed, Vault 13 still had remnants of the yet-existent concept as the Overseers were tasked with keeping its residents in the vault no matter what, for as long as possible.

Vault-Tec's lore formulized with the release of Fallout 2, in which Cain described one of the vaults as being a "control vault," explaining it as giving the company "a purpose beyond just 'let's save some of the American population then release them back into a radioactive dead zone.'"

Vault-Tec appears in Fallout 3, notably behind the creation of several vaults in the Capital Wasteland such as Vault 101, where the Lone Wanderer begins the game.

In Fallout 4, the player is guided through a tutorial sequence where they enter Vault 111 and, as part of Vault-Tec's experiment within this vault, becoming cryogenically frozen for two centuries. One of the game's DLC is Vault-Tec Workshop, in which the player has the ability to construct and customize the initially-empty Vault 88.

In Fallout Shelter, the player builds and manages their own vault.

In Fallout 76, which takes place in West Virginia, the player is an inhabitant of Vault 76, one of the 17 "control" vaults. According to a log in Fallout 3, one of the workers for Vault 76, the assistant CEO of Vault-Tec, was kidnapped by aliens. Vault-Tec runs an institution in the area known as Vault-Tec University, which features a simulation vault for training purposes.

=== Vault-Tec buildings and structures ===
Some of Vault-Tec's buildings and structures have been featured throughout the series. The Vault-Tec Headquarters is a landmark featured in Fallout 3, which takes place in Washington, D.C., and the Vault-Tec Regional HQ, Vault-Tec's headquarters in Boston, is a landmark in Fallout 4. Additionally, "Among the Stars" is a Vault-Tec amusement park attraction in the Fallout 4: Nuka-World expansion pack. The Vault-Tec University is also a landmark in Fallout 76. The Fallout television series also reveals that Vault-Tec has a headquarter building in California.

=== Fallout show ===
Vault-Tec is featured in the 2024 television adaptation Fallout. It goes into more depth surrounding its pre-war corporate events, contributing heavily to the plot of the series. Four of their vaults were featured in the series: three neighboring vaults (Vault 33, Vault 32 and Vault 31), Vault 4, and Vault 24, whose experiment was the brainwashing of American patriots into communists.

Lucy MacLean (Ella Purnell), a dweller of Vault 33, leaves in search of her Overseer father Hank MacLean (Kyle MacLachlan) who was kidnapped during a New California Republic (NCR) raid led by Lee Moldaver (Sarita Choudhury). One of the earliest mentions of the corporation itself takes place in the second episode where Enclave-defector Siggi Wilzig (Michael Emerson) takes "Vault-Tec Plan D," a cyanide pill which he described as "the most humane product that Vault-Tec ever made." It becomes later revealed in the show that Vault-Tec, led by representative Barb Howard (Frances Turner), was proposing dropping nuclear bombs throughout the United States to initiate a nuclear war, allowing themselves to be the only ones left thanks to the Vaults. High-ranking employees of the corporation, including Hank, were cryogenically frozen inside of Vault 31, as discovered by Norm MacLean (Moisés Arias). It is also revealed that Hank dropped a nuclear bomb on the NCR's headquarters, Shady Sands, following the NCR's rise in political power over California.

The show featured an easter egg by providing a Vault-Tec phone number through an in-show advertisement casting actor and Vault-Tec spokesman Cooper Howard (Walton Goggins), which viewers could actually contact.

== Promotion and reception ==
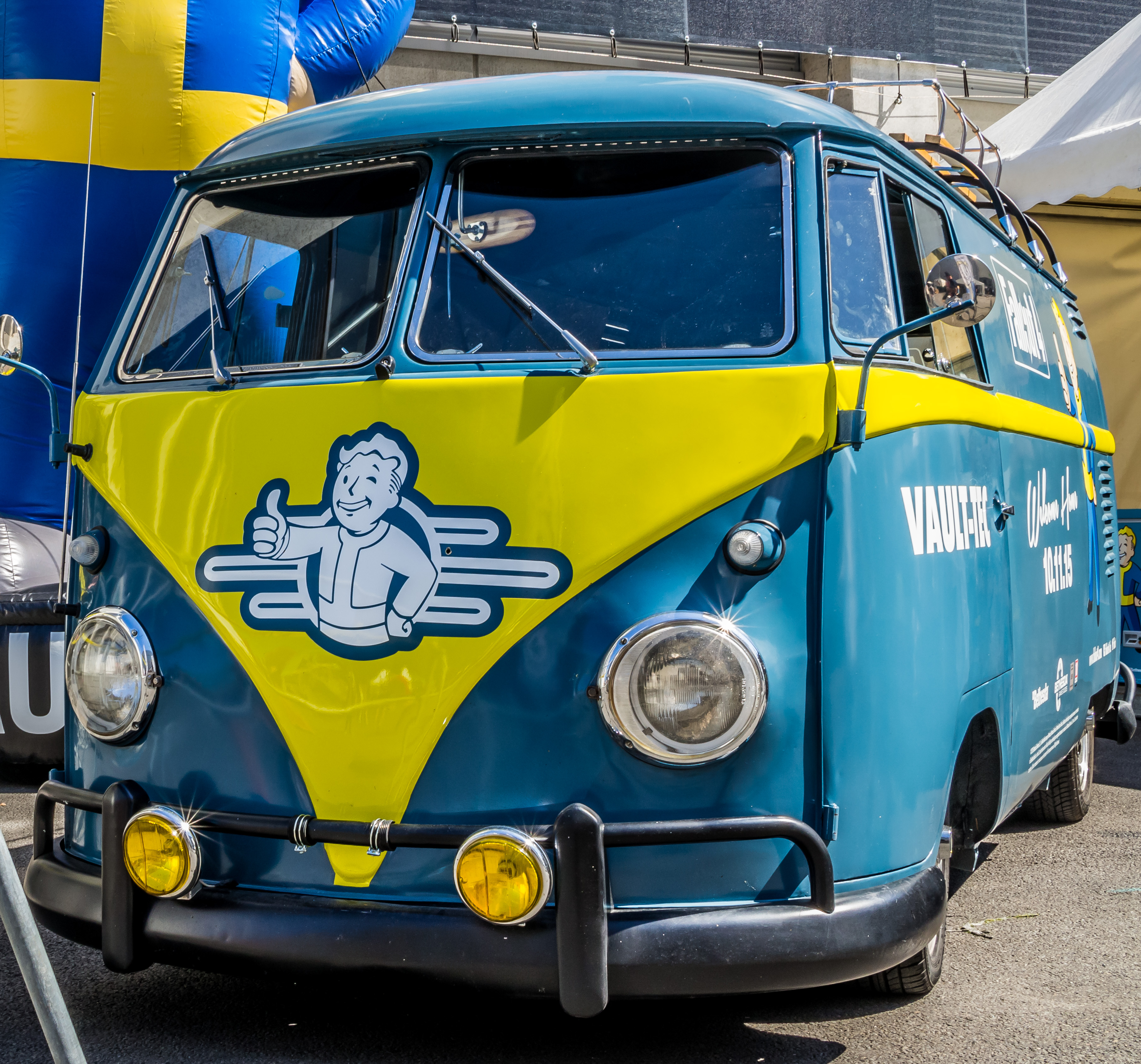
A Vault-Tec themed van at Gamescom 2015

In 2008, as part of a marketing campaign for Fallout 3, a collector's edition version of the game was released, which included a Vault-Tec lunch box. In 2019, a limited edition Vault-Tec themed computer case was released by NZXT, with a limited quantity of 1,000 units. The following year, Bethesda partnered with gaming chair company Noblechairs to release a Vault-Tec edition chair. Following the release of the 2024 Fallout series, Arizona Beverage Company released Fallout and Vault-Tec themed ice tea energy drinks. Gunnar Optiks also released Vault 33-themed eyeglasses.

Vault-Tec has been placed in several top-ranking lists for evil corporations within video games, including by The Guardian, GamesRadar+, PC Gamer, and TheGamer. Sarah Milner of Polygon described Vault-Tec as having "little interest in saving the population – its corporate leadership was playing the long game, using the majority of the Vaults to conduct social experiments and scientific research, free from the restraints of regulations or ethics."
