= Fallout 2 =

1998 video game

- Developer: Black Isle Studios
- Publisher: Interplay Productions (Note: MacPlay published the Mac OS X version.)
- Producers: Eric DeMilt; Feargus Urquhart
- Designers: Tim Cain; Feargus Urquhart; Matthew J. Norton
- Programmer: Jesse Reynolds
- Artists: Gary Platner; Tramell Ray Isaac
- Writer: Mark O'Green
- Composers: Mark Morgan; Rick Jackson
- Series: Fallout
- Platforms: Windows; Mac OS X
- Release: Windows; October 29, 1998; Mac OS X; August 23, 2002
- Genre: Role-playing
- Mode: Single-player

Fallout 2: A Post Nuclear Role Playing Game is a 1998 role-playing video game developed by Black Isle Studios and published by Interplay Productions. It is a sequel to Fallout (1997), featuring similar graphics and game mechanics. The game's story takes place in 2241, roughly 80 years after the events of Fallout and 164 years after the atomic war which reduced the vast majority of the world to a nuclear wasteland. The player assumes the role of the Chosen One, the grandchild of the first game's protagonist, and undertakes a quest to save their small village on the West Coast of the United States.

Fallout 2 was well received by critics, who praised its gameplay and storyline, and considered it a worthy successor to the original Fallout and one of the greatest games of all time. Its bugs and limited updates to the formula of the first game attracted criticism. In 2008, it was followed by a sequel, Fallout 3, developed by Bethesda Game Studios.

== Gameplay ==
An example of dialogue between characters in Fallout 2

Fallout 2 is a role-playing video game. The player begins by selecting one of three pre-made characters, or one with player-customized attributes. The protagonist, known as the Chosen One, has seven primary statistics that the player can set: strength, perception, endurance, charisma, intelligence, agility, and luck. Each statistic may range from one to ten, provided their sum does not exceed 40. Two other statistics set during character creation are skills and, optionally, traits. All 18 skills are learned abilities, their effectiveness determined by a percentage value. Their initial effectivenesses are determined by the primary statistics, but three can be tagged and given a 20% boost. Traits are character qualities with both a positive and negative effect; the player can pick up to two from a list of sixteen. During gameplay, the player can gather experience points through various actions. For gathering experience points, the player will level up and may increase their skills by a set number of points. Every three (or four with the Skilled trait) levels, the player can optionally grant themselves a special ability, or perk. There are 69 perks (plus ten "special" perks which can only be obtained through specific means), and each has prerequisites that must be met. For example, "Pickpocket", which makes it much easier to steal from people by removing the debuffs from pickpocketing them in their line of sight and from stealing larger items, requires the player to be level fifteen, have an agility of eight, and have a steal skill of 80%.

=== Exploration and combat ===
In Fallout 2, the player explores the game world from a trimetric perspective and interacts with non-player characters (NPCs). Characters vary in their amount of dialogue; some say short messages, while others speak at length. Certain characters are illustrated with 3D models, known as "talking heads", during conversations. The player can barter with other characters by trading unwanted valuables or by using gold coins produced by one of the game's major factions as currency. The game has fourteen companions that the player can recruit for exploration and combat and can be configured via a menu to determine their inventory as well as their preferred weapons, armor, and combat style, except for dog characters. Unlike the previous game, it is possible to continue playing after beating the main storyline, and the player has thirteen in-game years to explore the world before the game automatically ends due to engine limits.

A new mechanic is reputations, which dictates how the game's various factions and settlements view the player character. Having positive reputation with an entity will usually result in rewards from leaders of the community, as well as opening up new questlines or ways to complete certain quests that might not have been available otherwise. Negative reputation will result in many of the community's members shunning the player and refusing to work with them and may even cause them to turn hostile on sight.

There are two main quests where completion is required, although the first one can be mostly skipped. The main quests have no time limit unlike the first game, but the player's reputation in their hometown will slowly decrease the longer they take to complete the first quest. Some characters give the player side quests; if the player solves them, they receive experience points and occasionally a reward in the form of money and/or goods. The player can utilize the PIP-Boy 2000, a portable wearable computer that tracks these quests. Many quests feature multiple solutions; they can often be completed through diplomacy, combat, or stealth, and some allow solutions that are unconventional or contrary to the original task. Based on how they completed quests, the player can earn or lose karma, which determine how others treat them. The player's actions dictate what future story or gameplay opportunities are available and the ending.

Combat is turn based and uses an action-point system, the number of action points that are available depending on certain perks and the player's allocation in the agility statistic. During each turn, multiple actions may be performed by the player until they run out of action points. Different actions such as attacking, moving, reloading, interacting with objects mid-combat, and accessing the inventory consume different amounts of points. The player can rapidly switch between two equipped weapons, and may acquire a diverse range of weapons, many of which can target specific areas of enemies. Melee (hand-to-hand) weapons typically have two attacks: swing or thrust. If the player has equipped no weapon, they can punch or kick.

When a player uses up all of their action points, they end their turn and enemies start theirs. If the player survives, they have their action points restored. Injuries and poisons can reduce the number of action points semi-permanently until the player heals themselves with stimpaks, doctor's bags, from an actual doctor, or by resting for a substantial period of time.

Organized crime, prostitution, and slavery are major elements of the setting.

== Plot ==
In 2241, the tribal community of Arroyo suffers the worst drought on record. Faced with the calamity, the village elder and daughter of the Vault Dweller tasks her child, the player, to retrieve a Garden of Eden Creation Kit (G.E.C.K.) — a device capable of creating thriving communities out of the post-apocalyptic wasteland. Assuming the title of the Chosen One, they are given the Vault Dweller's jumpsuit, a RobCo PIPBoy 2000, a Vault 13 water flask, a spear, and some cash to start them on their mission.

The Chosen One finds Vault 13, the location of a G.E.C.K., devoid of its former human residents and instead inhabited by intelligent Deathclaws. Returning to their village, they find it empty and learn its population was captured by the remnants of the United States government known as "The Enclave". The Enclave terrorizes the inhabitants of the continental United States with their supreme arsenal of advanced technology. The Chosen One, through various means, activates an ancient oil tanker and engages its autopilot, thus allowing them to reach the Enclave's main base on an offshore oil rig. It is revealed that the dwellers of Vault 13 were captured as well, to be used as test subjects for the Forced Evolutionary Virus (FEV). Vault 13 was supposed to be closed for 200 years as part of a government experiment, making them perfect test subjects. The Enclave modified the FEV into an airborne disease, designed to attack any living creatures with mutated DNA. With all genetic impurities removed, the Enclave (who remain protected from radiation) could take over. The Chosen One frees both their fellow villagers from Arroyo and the Vault 13 dwellers from Enclave captivity and subsequently destroys the Enclave's oil rig, killing Dick Richardson (Jeffrey Jones), the President of the United States, and Frank Horrigan (Michael Dorn), a cybernetic Super Mutant working for the Enclave's Secret Service.

In the end, the inhabitants of Vault 13 and the villagers usher in a new era of prosperity to Arroyo with the help of the G.E.C.K., turning the community into a flourishing city.

== Development ==
Tim Cain announced Fallout 2 via a Usenet posting in December 1997, and wrote that it "should take 11 months". Cain later clarified that the sequel entered development before the launch of Fallout, as the previous game had "really caused a buzz in the studio about six months before it was released". According to co-founder of Black Isle Studios Feargus Urquhart, Interplay was experiencing financial difficulties at the beginning of 1998, which according to Urquhart, gave the studio "basically nine months to make the whole game". In order to reach this deadline, many staff were taken from the Planescape: Torment development team and made to work on Fallout 2. Additionally, the development team were also made to work crunch time to make up for a lack of manpower and time.

== Reception ==
Reviews

Aggregate scores
Aggregator	Score
GameRankings	87%
Metacritic	86/100

Review scores
Publication	Score
AllGame	4.5/5
Computer Gaming World	4/5
GamePro	5/5
GameSpot	8.8/10
IGN	8.9/10
PC Gamer (US)	89%
Computer Games Strategy Plus	4/5
Next Generation	4/5
PC Gaming World	9.5/10

Edit on Wikidata

Fallout 2 received critical acclaim, according to the review aggregator websites Metacritic and GameRankings. It was a finalist for "PC Role-Playing Game of the Year" during the AIAS' 2nd Annual Interactive Achievement Awards, along with nominations for role-playing game of the year awards from Computer Gaming World, GameSpot, CNET Gamecenter, and IGN; all were ultimately given to Baldur's Gate. The editors of GameSpot wrote, "A bigger, better Fallout, this sequel to 1997's RPG of the Year was populated with more characters, more places to go, and more things to do."

Positive reviewers praised the gameplay, storyline, and worthiness as a successor to the original Fallout, while detractors criticized frequent bugs and lack of improvement over the first game. Daniel Morris of GamePro praised the mix of action and character interaction as well as the non-linear gameplay. IGN applauded the developers for the sizable game world, the writing, and "not fixing something that wasn't broken." Game Revolution praised the game's depth and storyline but criticized its graphics and interface.

=== Sales ===
Fallout 2 was a commercial success. In the United States, it secured third place on PC Data's computer game sales rankings for the first week of November 1998. It was absent from the weekly top 10 by the following week, but debuted at #20 for the month of November overall. Fallout 2 sold 123,000 copies in the United States by March 2000. GameSpot writer Desslock considered these "very good sales, especially since the overall [worldwide] figures are likely double those amounts." According to Keza MacDonald of Eurogamer, Fallout 2 was unsuccessful in the United Kingdom; she noted that the game and its predecessor totaled just over 50,000 sales combined in the region.

As of March of 2025 Fallout 2 is available for purchase on several major PC game platforms, including Steam and GOG. These platforms include the SFALL version 4.4.5 patch (see improvements section of GOG's Fallout 2 store page) that modifies the game to have improved compatibility and performance with modern operating systems & screen resolutions, and cloud save functionality; though there is an option when launching the game to play "classic Fallout", which runs the game in its original 640x480 resolution. Both platforms also include the 1.02 version of the game, which was the last official patch released by Interplay on February 11, 1999, it could originally be downloaded from their website or mailed on a 3½-inch floppy disc (prior to broadband internet games often had to be patched with disks), the final U.S. version of the patch was 1.02d (U.K. is 1.01) and includes fixes for a number of major bugs including both combat and quest glitches.

== Legacy ==
In 2013, GamesRadar ranked Fallout 2 number 68 on their list of top video games of all time. That same year, IGN ranked it as the 28th best role-playing video game ever. In 2015, PC Gamer ranked the game #3 on its list of best RPGs of all time.

In retrospect, the designers of Fallout 2 expressed reservations about the game, with Chris Avellone calling it "a slapdash project without a lot of oversight". Retro Gamer described Fallout 2 as "an impressive feat, yet still one that rubbed Fallout diehards the wrong way."

Fallout 2 was one of the first games to feature same sex marriage (Great Greed, released in 1992, is an even earlier example) and one of the first games to include LGBT representation in general.
