= Galaxy News Radio =

Video game radio station

- Fallout location
- The plaza for the Galaxy News Radio in Fallout 3
- First appearance: Fallout 3 (2008)
- Genre: Action role-playing game

In-universe information
- Location: Washington, D.C., United States (Fallout)
- Characters: Three Dog, Margaret, Brotherhood of Steel

Galaxy News Radio (GNR) is a fictional radio station in the 2008 video game Fallout 3, created by Bethesda Game Studios as part of the Fallout franchise, expanded from the brief mention of "Galaxy News Network" in the 1997 video game Fallout. In the game's lore and prior to the main events, it was co-revived by the militant faction called the Brotherhood of Steel (which hosts a military base there) and a mostly independent DJ and subsequent radio host Three Dog, voiced by Erik Todd Dellums. It serves as one of the game's three radio stations that can air music from transmissions that can be received by the arm-strapped Pip-Boy of the player character, known as the Lone Wanderer. The radio's signal starts off as weak, but the player character can approach the station's plaza to potentially help Three Dog replace the satellite dish atop the Washington Monument in exchange for information regarding their father's whereabouts as part of the game's main quest. The GNR broadcasts pre-recorded commentary on the Capital Wasteland setting, the Lone Wanderer's actions, and other characters from Three Dog along with real-life big band songs dating from the 1930s to the 1950s in reference to the series' pre-war setting and vibes.

The Galaxy News Radio has been well received by critics for its iconicity and standards set for radio stations in the Fallout franchise, with particular praise being given to Three Dog for his entertaining commentary that made players feel uplifted and less lonely amidst travel in the desolate wasteland setting. The radio station and its music choices have been discussed by academic scholars in relation to player agency over them and how the lyrics and music style of the classic songs like "I Don't Want to Set the World on Fire" by The Ink Spots could be interpreted in relation to the post-war setting (especially invoking senses of irony and double meaning). It has also been part of an online urban legend in which a numbers station replaces the signals of the GNR to air cryptic messages predicting major events.

== Appearance ==
The Galaxy News Radio (GNR) is a radio station that airs in the Galaxy News Radio building plaza, a pre-war structure (built prior to the nuclear war of 2077 that devastated the United States) in the Capital Wasteland setting of Washington, D.C in the 2008 action role-playing game Fallout 3, developed by Bethesda Game Studios as part of the Fallout franchise. Galaxy News Radio was a subsidiary of the Galaxy News Network, itself the largest media corporation prior to the 2077 war that issued pro-government and pro-corporation news stories. The radio station was co-revived in 2272 by a militant faction called the Brotherhood of Steel and an independent individual named Three Dog, the former of which guards the area as a military base and the latter of whom serves as the radio station's DJ and host. The Brotherhood of Steel had also repurposed the Washington Monument to serve as a radio broadcasting tower for the Galaxy News Radio station. Galaxy News Radio is one of the three radio stations that broadcasts music and commentary in Fallout 3, the other two being the Enclave Radio (under control of a fascist paramilitary organization called the Enclave) and Agatha's Station (operated by an old woman named Agatha Egglebrecht). Three Dog was voiced by Erik Todd Dellums, who had not been confirmed for future Fallout entries but had repeatedly expressed interest in playing similar roles to that of the Fallout 3 DJ.

Upon exiting Vault 101 early game as part of the main quest for the Lone Wanderer (the player character) to find their father James in 2277, they can use their arm-strapped Pip-Boy to immediately access outside radio frequency transmissions like that of GNR. However, GNR's signal starts off as weak. As part of the game's main quest, the player can head over to the plaza to ask Three Dog for the whereabouts of their father should they not have yet have found him. Upon approaching the area, the player character can choose to defend the radio station's area with the guarding Brotherhood of Steel members from a hostile Super Mutant Behemoth. In return for information regarding James from Three Dog, the radio host tasks the Lone Wanderer with boosting the GNR radio signal. The Lone Wanderer has to complete the task by retrieving the Virgo II Moon Lander's satellite dish, located in The Mall's Museum of Technology, and then installing it on top of the Washington Monument to serve as a high-level radio tower. Alternatively, the player character can bypass Three Dog's quest and obtain information about their father using a dialogue check from a high-enough speech stat. However, they can still choose to perform an enhancement to the GNR's signal. Should the player character decide to take on Three Dog's radio signal quest after having visited Rivet City and/or finding their father in Vault 112, he will offer an alternative reward for the Lone Wanderer upon completion.

Three Dog's philosophy while airing the radio is fighting the "good fight". His affiliation with the Brotherhood of Steel was only loose as his commentary was of his own opinions. Depending on the player character's actions, Three Dog will either praise them for their heroic actions or condemn them for doing evil acts. For instance, should the player character detonate a nuclear warhead in Megaton, the radio host will condemn them for their action. If the Lone Wanderer has negative karma (an in-game stat weighed by the moralities of the player's actions), Three Dog will harshly deride them. He is also a vocal critic of the Enclave, especially speaking harshly of its president John Henry Eden. While the airings are meant to replicate live commentary, the fact that the player can hear them while seeing that Three Dog is not actually live on air implies that they were pre-recorded. He also offers other forms of commentary like advocating for ghouls' rights by asking that Alistair Tenpenny allow them to live in Tenpenny Tower. Three Dog may also appeal to James that his child misses them, advising that should the two meet again, James should give them "a pat on the back and wish [them] luck." The Galaxy News Radio station also airs big band music dating from the 1930s to the 1950s, such as the 1938 pop song "I Don't Want to Set the World on Fire", the 1947 traditional pop song "Civilization", and the 1949 song "Butcher Pete, Pt. 1". 20 songs are played from GNR total, although specific details of some of the songs like the performer and the year the song was composed are unknown and therefore are not listed in the game's credits. Of note is that many of the songs featured by GNR were originally created by black musicians. The music choices are strongly contrasted with the American patriotic hymns played by the Enclave Radio and the violin repertoires and improvisions from Agatha's Station. If Three Dog was killed by the Lone Wanderer, his assistant Margaret will take over and broadcast complaints about her boss being deceased.

== Reception ==
The Galaxy News Radio station and its DJ Three Dog have both been positively received by critics as some of the top features of the Fallout series. TheGamer writer Zackary Wiggs said that Three Dog appealed to many players as "the only voice of comfort in the Capital Wasteland" because of his "often calming voice and music repertoire" and the fact that players could meet him in-person. Similarly, Issy van der Velde of NME ranked GNR as the best radio station in the Fallout game series, praising it for serving as the wasteland's "bastion" and Three Dog for his wit and being a "loveable, righteous, charismatic presenter". Cass Marshall, writing for Polygon, also ranked Galaxy News Radio as the best Fallout series radio station. They argued that it introduced the concept of live radio stations in the Fallout franchise and not only "remains iconic" but also "helped set the standard for the rest of these stations". PC Gamer writer Andy Chalk, like Three Dog's voice actor Erik Dellums, voiced disappointment at his character not returning for Fallout 4, lamenting that he would not return to play a similar role in which he "[brought] the Capital Wasteland to life". Diego Arguello of VG247 felt that Three Dog helped to provide strong encouragement to push forward on his goals, did a "good job" providing updates on news of the Capital Wasteland, and helped to alleviate the "initial sense of loneliness" that came from exploring the wasteland early on. He also stated that he felt senses of surprise then joy the first time he heard of Three Dog speaking about James in relation to the Lone Wanderer, expressing that it made him feel as if a "complete stranger now had [his] back, and [he] didn’t feel alone anymore"; he said that he also found himself smiling whenever the DJ made a joke or an "inspiring line". He finally said that people should follow Three Dog in lifting people up, that even the smallest moments of such can be valued in the long run.

Galaxy News Radio has also been the subject of several academic sources mainly in relation to what it broadcasts. Michael James Heron, a British academic scholar of Robert Gordon University, noted the music choices of the "cheerfully liberal" Three Dog (contrasting with the strongly jingoistic Enclave Station) as being an instance of Caledonian Antisyzygy, in which two strong polarities make up a greater entity. He cited the lyrics and music style of two songs played by GNR, "Into Each Life Some Rain Must Fall" by The Ink Spots and "Anything Goes" by Cole Porter, as being light-hearted in contrast to the strongly desolated Capital Wasteland setting. This, he suggested, highlighted the vibes of the United States in the 1950s (the pre-war time in the Fallout setting) versus the desolated setting that causes a sense of mental dissonance that "cannot ever be fully resolved". William Cheng, the music professor of Dartmouth College, highlighted Fallout 3 as a good example to how the player has enough agency to determine whether certain music stations will air or not, such as if they do not help to replace the faulty satellite dish on top of the Washington Monument to strengthen the radio signals. He argued that the music aired by GNR could have reminded the wasteland survivors of a golden age long past, back when a time where the world was set on fire (referencing "I Don't Want to Set the World on Fire" by the Ink Spots) was hardly imaginable and therefore served as contradictory and nostalgic tunes in relation to the game's setting. Furthermore, Cheng suggested that the songs from both GNR and the Enclave Radio invoked the sense that the hyperviolence plaguing the American wasteland was there to stay. Furthermore, he noted that the lyrics of several songs from GNR like "I Don't Want to Set the World on Fire" serve as double entendres in which they could be interpreted by audiences as tying into the game's desolate ruins themes.

The GNR in Fallout 3 has also been the subject of an urban legend as discussed by GamesRadar author Justin Towell in 2010, who questioned why someone would write "such a detailed and elaborate hoax". He said that forum posts on Snopes wrote of a rumor in which Fallout 3 was rarely able to predict future events based on certain conditions from a numbers station that occasionally replaces the airings of GNR under certain conditions. One post alleged that a WikiForums user interpreted the threads' Morse code that read "one-two-five-five-two-eight-two-zero-one-zero. What you talkin' 'bout? You'll be missed" and connected the line to the time and death of American actor Gary Coleman (who died on May 28, 2010) based on the numbers' order. The user then continued through the forum's messages, enlisted the help of others, and reacted in shock to the next message he read and interpreted, which said, "nine-four-five-four-two-zero-two-zero-one-zero. Accident in the gulf, several dead. Oil spill apparently averted." His shock was due to his realization that the code predicted the Deepwater Horizon oil spill of April 20 of 2010. Towell said that the hoax sounded believable at first but had no evidence of such existence online and was disproven by an email from Bethesda, who said that it sounded like a "cool theory".

== See also ==
- Music of the Fallout series
