= Fallout 3 downloadable content =

Downloadable content for 2008 video game

- Developer: Bethesda Game Studios
- Publisher: Bethesda Softworks
- Designers: Emil Pagliarulo; Todd Howard; Istvan Pely
- Series: Fallout
- Engine: Gamebryo
- Platforms: Microsoft Windows, PlayStation 3, Xbox 360
- Release: Operation: Anchorage; January 27, 2009 (XBL/GFWL); October 1, 2009 (PSN); The Pitt; March 25, 2009 (XBL/GFWL); October 1, 2009 (PSN); Broken Steel; May 5, 2009 (XBL/GFWL); September 24, 2009 (PSN); Point Lookout; June 23, 2009 (XBL/GFWL); October 8, 2009 (PSN); Mothership Zeta; August 3, 2009 (XBL/GFWL); October 8, 2009 (PSN)

There are five packs of downloadable content (DLC) for the Bethesda action role-playing video game Fallout 3. Each package of downloadable content adds new missions, new locales to visit, new non-player characters to encounter, and new items to use. Of the five, Broken Steel has the largest effect on the game, altering the ending, increasing the level cap to 30, and allowing the player to continue playing past the end of the main quest line. The 2009 Game of The Year edition of Fallout 3 includes the full game and all five pieces of downloadable content.

The downloadable content was originally only available for Xbox Live and Games for Windows. Although Bethesda had not offered an explanation as to why the content was not released for PlayStation 3, Lazard Capital Markets analyst Colin Sebastian speculated that it may have been the result of an exclusivity deal with Bethesda by Sony's competitor, Microsoft. When asked if the PlayStation 3 version would receive an update that would enable gameplay beyond the main quest's completion, game director Todd Howard responded, "Not at this time, no". However, in May 2009, Bethesda announced that the existing DLC packs (Operation: Anchorage, The Pitt and Broken Steel) would be made available for the PlayStation 3; the latter two (Point Lookout and Mothership Zeta) were initially planned to release for all platforms simultaneously, but ended up releasing on Xbox and GFWL several months in advance before PS3.

== Operation: Anchorage ==
Operation: Anchorage is the first Fallout 3 downloadable content pack and takes place in a virtual reality "military simulation" in the main game where the protagonist, the Lone Wanderer, is stripped of their equipment and is forced to use provided replacements. The content focuses on the Liberation of Anchorage during the Sino-American War in 2077. The pack contains several new quests, new items, and adds four new achievements. Gameplay within the simulation is different than the main game; health and ammo are replenished by supply stations in certain areas of the simulation world, items functionally do not suffer from decay, and enemy corpses disappear instead of allowing the player to loot them for supplies.

Operation: Anchorage was released in North America and Europe on January 27, 2009 on Xbox Live and Games for Windows Live. Although the content was scheduled for release on the PlayStation 3 in June 2009, the final week of June's PlayStation Store updates did not include it. Bethesda released information suggesting that the delay was due to their desire to iron out all of the bugs before release as well as test compatibility between DLCs. Operation: Anchorage, along with The Pitt, were released on October 1, 2009, for PS3.

=== Plot ===
In the mid-21st century, vital economic and industrial resources, including food, uranium, and petroleum, began to run out worldwide. In 2066, the People's Republic of China desperately invaded Alaska and occupied Anchorage in order to capture the United States' oil reserves, starting the Sino-American War. The US launched a counter-invasion of mainland China and fully liberated Alaska during the Battle of Anchorage in early 2077. A virtual reality simulation depicting the battle, designed to train American soldiers for live combat, was created prior to the eruption of the Great War later that year.

Two centuries later, a detachment of Brotherhood of Steel Outcasts are attempting to acquire a stash of advanced technology in a pre-war government bunker beneath Bailey's Crossroads, but the armory requires a special code to unlock, which can only be obtained from the Anchorage simulation. The Outcasts cannot access it because an external interface device, the Lone Wanderer's Pip-Boy, is required. After the player is drawn to the area by a distress signal sent by the Outcasts and assists them in fighting off attacking super mutants, they are recruited to complete the simulation in return for a share of the reward.

In the simulation, the player is tasked with fighting the Chinese in various scenarios, such as clearing out bunkers in the cliffside, destroying artillery batteries, and finally disrupting a massive forcefield before advancing on their base and defeating the enemy general, Jingwei, in single combat. Once the simulation is complete, the player gains access to the armory and the advanced technology it contains. Upon opening the door and claiming their reward, an argument ensues between Protector McGraw and Defender Sibley, the latter of whom revolts and betrays the former for sharing the equipment with the Lone Wanderer. The player can fight alongside McGraw, Specialist Olin, and their loyalists or leave them to die at the hands of Sibley and his rebels. Either way, the revolting Outcasts must be killed or evaded.

=== Reception ===
Both the PC and the Xbox 360 version of the Operation: Anchorage DLC received mixed reviews from critics, averaging a 67 and a 69 respectively at Metacritic. Several reviewers criticized Operation: Anchorage for being too expensive for the content provided. Play.tm's Richard Bright and other reviewers were disappointed overall, with Bright stating "this episode was a little disappointing for me personally." Game Over's Phil Soletsky was particularly critical of the expansion's story, saying "I had been hoping that the liberation of Alaska would be a massive affair involving battalions of soldiers hammering away at each other." IGN's Erik Brudvig gave high praise to the new weapon, the Gauss rifle, calling it "freakin' awesome". Reviewers also criticized the shift to a focus on action gameplay, instead of the more varied gameplay that Fallout 3 had.

== The Pitt ==
The Pitt is the second downloadable content pack. It allows the player to journey to the remains of Pittsburgh, Pennsylvania, now an industrial raider-controlled city known as the Pitt. The pack features several new weapons, new armor and clothing items, four achievements and around four to five hours of gameplay. The Pitt was released on March 24, 2009, on Xbox Live and Games for Windows Live, but was quickly removed due to severe glitches in the gameplay which made the Xbox 360 version of the expansion unplayable. Further investigation was performed by Bethesda and Microsoft, and on March 25, 2009, the expansion was again uploaded to Xbox Live, and was made available once more that afternoon. For those who downloaded it on March 24 in the morning, glitches were still apparent. A new version was available on Xbox Live on April 2, fixing freezing issues many players had encountered with the previous version. A retail disk was released at the end of May 2009 containing this and the Operation: Anchorage downloadable content. It was released for Xbox 360 and Games for Windows. The downloadable content is copied to the hard drive and functions as it would have had it been downloaded. This pack was released for the PlayStation 3 at the same time as Operation Anchorage on October 1, 2009.

=== Plot ===
"Welcome to The Pitt"

Following the Great War, the radiation from nuclear fallout mixed with the unique industrial toxins and pollutants from Pittsburgh, Pennsylvania's pre-war factories, creating the Troglodyte Degeneration Contagion (TDC) and resulting in both the overall decay and inhospitality of the region. Consequently, the inhabitants suffer from extreme radiation poisoning. Some unlucky survivors slowly regress mentally into crazed individuals known as wildmen, before eventually degenerating further and becoming mindless dwarfed creatures called trogs.

Around 30 years before the Lone Wanderer leaves Vault 101 and begins their journey, Star Paladin Owyn Lyons led a Brotherhood of Steel expedition to Pittsburgh, now known as the Pitt. After witnessing its state — being filled with marauding gangsters, rapists, and killers preying on the innocent — he ordered a large-scale assault, destroying the raider forces occupying the city and killing anything that put up a fight. This event is chronicled as "the Scourge". One Brotherhood member, Initiate Ishmael Ashur, was believed killed and the only casualty, having been buried under rubble and ultimately left behind. In reality, Ashur survived due to his power armor protecting him from being crushed, before being dug up by a family of scavengers. In the following decades, he would go on to form an army of raiders and conquer the Pitt, using slave labor and the pre-war industrial infrastructure to begin rebuilding the city. As such, the entire non-wildman and non-trog population are either slaves or overseers.

The Lone Wanderer is informed of the Pitt from a distress broadcast by a man named Wernher, an escaped slave who asks for their help in liberating the other slaves there. The player enters the city as a slave and works their way to freedom by partaking in gladiator fights, which earns them a meeting with Ashur. They learn that his infant daughter, Marie, possesses a natural immunity to radiation and TDC, and he is studying her to develop a cure. It is revealed that Wernher was formerly Ashur's right-hand man and lieutenant, before being enslaved for attempting to usurp him. The player is then given the choice of siding with either Wernher or Ashur, aiding the slave uprising or quelling it. Unlike other decisions in Fallout 3, there is no karmic penalty or reward for choosing either side, as each have both good and bad aspects.

=== Reception ===
The Pitt received generally positive reviews, averaging a score of 77 for the PC version and 76 for the Xbox 360 version. When initially released, the Xbox 360 version had a corrupt file which caused technical issues and rendered the DLC unplayable. On April 3, 2009, Bethesda Softworks reported that they had uploaded a new version of The Pitt which fixed these problems. The PC version of The Pitt had the same problem, leading modders to upload a community patch to provide a temporary fix until Bethesda patched the PC release.

== Broken Steel ==
Broken Steel is the third and most significant downloadable content pack, altering the original ending of Fallout 3 and allowing the player to continue playing past the end of the main quest line. If the player personally activates Project Purity, their character no longer dies but instead wakes up after a two-week coma to officially join the ranks of the Brotherhood of Steel and help rid the Capital Wasteland of the Enclave once and for all. The pack raises the game's level cap from 20 to 30. It includes three main quests and three side-quests. Three Dog has new dialogue in this expansion, but no new songs are added to the radio.

Broken Steel was released on May 5, 2009, on Xbox Live and Games for Windows Live. It was quickly removed from GFWL due to bugs which made the PC version of the expansion unplayable, and rereleased two days later. Some Xbox 360 users reported a bug that prevented them from activating Project Purity, resulting in the plot elements added by the DLC being inaccessible. PC users reported that changes caused by Broken Steel and the 1.5 patch adversely affected mods.

This pack was the first released for PlayStation 3 due to it being the most requested DLC for Fallout 3. This is primarily due to the continuation of the story past the game's original ending, and for the raise in the level cap from level 20 to 30, as many complained that the cap could be reached far too quickly in playing the game's main campaign. Bethesda announced on their website that "The first DLC for PlayStation 3, Broken Steel, [was] made available on September 24 in English territories and will be followed by the release of Operation: Anchorage and The Pitt on October 1 and Point Lookout and Mothership Zeta on October 8."

=== Plot ===
Liberty Prime, a US Army assault robot built before the Great War, attacking an Enclave position

Broken Steel alters the ending of the original Fallout 3 to allow continued play after the end of the main quest line. When the player reaches the final point of the quest "Take it Back!", new options are given to allow specific followers to enter the irradiated control room, but the original options still remain viable. Regardless of what is chosen (unless the Purifier is allowed to explode, which automatically ends the game), the Lone Wanderer wakes up two weeks later at the Brotherhood's headquarters, the Citadel — formerly the Pentagon — having been knocked unconscious by a radiation spike. Sentinel Sarah Lyons will also be in a coma, unless she activated the purifier, in which case she will have perished.

In the time the Lone Wanderer was knocked out, the Brotherhood established a partnership with Rivet City's security force to distribute clean, fresh water from Project Purity throughout the Capital Wasteland, finally achieving the dream of the Lone Wanderer's father. Meanwhile, the Brotherhood has been using the assault robot Liberty Prime to root out the remaining Enclave presence. The Lone Wanderer is officially knighted by Elder Owyn Lyons and is sent to take part in a forward assault on an Enclave satellite relay station, led by Liberty Prime and supervised by Paladin Tristan. The assault goes well, until an unexpected strike by an orbital weapons platform, the Bradley-Hercules, destroys Liberty Prime. After investigating the relay station, the Brotherhood agrees that taking out this new threat is the top priority.

The Lone Wanderer is tasked with retrieving a tesla coil from an underground power plant in the deathclaw-infested town of Old Olney in order to build a prototype weapon, the Tesla Cannon. The Brotherhood soon begins an attack on the Enclave's last major stronghold, Adams Air Force Base. The fighting provides cover for the Lone Wanderer to sneak in through a secret presidential metro tunnel. There, Tristan instructs them to enter the base's old air traffic control tower in order to activate a ramp to a large crawler transport containing the Bradley-Hercules' control terminal. After fighting through Enclave soldiers at the base's hangars and reaching the tower, the Lone Wanderer infiltrates the crawler. Upon locating the terminal, they use it to call an orbital strike on itself, before evacuating via a Brotherhood vertibird as the crawler explodes behind them.

Alternatively, the Citadel can be targeted instead, which destroys it completely and brands the Lone Wanderer as a traitor to the Brotherhood.

Additional quests include stopping attacks on the Brotherhood's purified water distribution lines and investigating a ghoul salesman's supposed miracle tonic.

=== Reception ===
Broken Steel received positive reactions, averaging an 81 for the PC and an 82 for the Xbox 360. The Sacramento Bee wrote "The previous two downloadable expansions are good, but this one's pretty much essential for a Fallout 3 fan". IGN mirrored this view by stating "Lifting the level cap breathes new life into a great game, but shouldn't totally overshadow a new series of quests that is a lot of fun." Edge, on the other hand, while commenting that "it's the most you're going to get out of Fallout's current batch of DLC", felt that "it lacks the scope or density of The Elder Scrolls IV: Oblivion's The Shivering Isles". The A.V. Club commented that "After deflating the finality of the original ending, Broken Steel is unsure what to do next, beyond sending you on a few entertaining but hollow missions to snuff out the remnants of the para-military Enclave. Thankfully, the expansion's B-story is more thoughtful, as it plunges into the chaos and profiteering that result when a limited supply of clean water starts flowing into the Wasteland".

In their end of year awards special, IGN named Broken Steel Best Expansion for the PC.

== Point Lookout ==
Point Lookout is the fourth downloadable content pack. It takes place in the rural Point Lookout State Park in southern Maryland, an irradiated swamp wasteland. Unlike previous DLC packs, which had their own main questlines and new maps with restricted exploration capabilities that the player was required to progress through, Point Lookout has a fully explorable wasteland and does not have a main questline, instead allowing the player to roam, explore, and interact with content of their own volition. This pack adds new enemies called swampfolk, mutated hillbillies that attack with weapons such as axes, shovels, and double-barreled shotguns (weapons that are also available to the player and other non-player characters), and feral tribals who worship an exotic psychoactive fruit called punga, as well as "swamp" variants of various base game creatures, including mirelurks and feral ghouls. The pack also adds numerous other weapons, new armor and clothing, new non-player characters, and new locations. Point Lookout was released on June 23, 2009, for the Xbox 360 and the PC and on October 8, 2009, for the PlayStation 3.

=== Plot ===
While no bombs were dropped on Point Lookout during the Great War, it was still adversely affected by radiation and degenerated into a toxic landscape just as unforgiving as the Capital Wasteland. In the years since, safe passage to the area has been provided via a riverboat called the Duchess Gambit, captained by Tobar the Ferryman who is offering travel to any wastelander seeking fortune and adventure.

Upon approaching the Duchess Gambit, the Lone Wanderer is informed by a woman named Catherine that her daughter Nadine previously went to Point Lookout but has yet to return and requests their assistance in finding her. The player then travels there onboard the ferry, which docks at Pilgrim's Landing, a pre-war tourist destination. While investigating an abandoned mansion, the player fends off an attack by local tribals and meets a ghoulified scientist named Desmond Lockheart, who has been feuding with his rival, Professor Calvert, since before the war.

Following a rite of passage in which they are briefly knocked unconscious, the Lone Wanderer infiltrates the tribe. They find Nadine and learn the tribe is secretly led by Calvert, who has survived the years as a brain floating in a vat of liquid. The player can choose to side with either him or Lockheart. Furthermore, it is revealed that Tobar secretly cuts out part of the brains of prospective tribals while they are unconscious during their rite of passage—the Lone Wanderer included, who confronts and kills him. Afterwards, Nadine becomes the ferry's new captain.

Additional quests include following the trail of a long-dead Chinese spy and discovering an ancient Lovecraftian tome known as the Krivbeknih.

=== Reception ===
Point Lookout received generally positive reviews, averaging a 79 for the PC and an 83 for the Xbox 360. Eurogamer stated "Like a compacted version of its parent game, this is the first DLC that has felt like a genuine expansion, as opposed to a just a few inconsequential missions thrown together." IGN noted that "[t]he stories and characters here are filled with that trademark Fallout dark humor, elevating these quests to a level that rivals the main game" and that "[t]he major draw to Point Lookout... is its emphasis on exploration." Edge calls it "the best expansion so far and the game at its worst," stating "if you want a microcosm of Fallout 3, equal parts adventuring, grinding, questing and scavenging, you might just think it the best expansion so far". Edge goes on to criticize Point Lookout for using "a lot of what you might call 'economy content' in Point Lookout: recycled enemies, text journals, variant weapons, and bogus forks in the storyline."

== Mothership Zeta ==
Mothership Zeta is the fifth and final downloadable content pack and follows the main character after being abducted by aliens when going to explore a mysterious radio transmission from a UFO crash site. It takes place entirely on an alien spacecraft, is comparable in size to Operation: Anchorage, and has a similar emphasis on combat as that DLC had. It was released on August 3, 2009 for the Xbox 360 and PC and on October 8, 2009 for the PlayStation 3, along with Point Lookout. This expansion is a first for the series, as it explores an easter egg, specifically the crashed alien spacecraft that can be found in Fallout 3 and the original Fallout.

=== Plot ===
Over the course of centuries, an alien race has secretly abducted countless humans from Earth, bringing them onboard a mothership, Zeta, for experimentation. While many are frozen and kept alive for extensive periods of time in a state of suspended animation, others are forcibly turned into aggressive creatures called abominations.

The Lone Wanderer receives an unintelligible radio transmission which leads them to a UFO crash site. Upon approaching the wreckage, they are beamed into Zeta. The player is relieved of their equipment and locked in a cell with another abductee named Somah, who helps them escape their initial captivity. With the assistance of Somah, a little girl named Sally, and a few other prisoners from several different time periods, the Lone Wanderer must fight their way through the aliens, robotic drones, and abominations to reach the bridge of the ship and defeat the alien captain.

Once the captain is dealt with, the abductees take control of the vessel to fight another alien mothership. The player controls the death ray in the battle. After destroying the enemy craft, the Lone Wanderer becomes Zeta's new captain and is able to return to Earth. They can go back to the ship at will, though most of it is locked down.

=== Reception ===
Mothership Zeta received mixed reactions from critics, averaging a 70 for the PC and a 65 for the Xbox 360. Edge comments that "Mothership Zeta's greatest asset is its looks" and that "whoever designed such beauty should be pretty peeved at the game around it". Edge also noted that they "encountered a script bug so catastrophic that we couldn't finish the game – we actually had to clip through a doorway and use console commands to bring everything back on track" and criticized the DLC for locking off most of the ship after completion. Eurogamer states that "the most disappointing factor about Mothership Zeta is how little subtlety is afforded to the details" and sums up the DLC as "repetitive, largely uninspired corridor combat, and boring, linear and samey mission design." Gamedaily praises Mothership Zeta for "keep[ing] Fallout's trademark humor intact", its improved graphics, and for the new enemies and weapons introduced.
