= Megaton (Fallout 3) =

Fictional town in video game

- Fallout location
- Megaton, as seen facing towards the town's center from above in Fallout 3
- First appearance: Fallout 3 (2008)
- Genre: Action role-playing game

In-universe information
- Location: Virginia, United States
- Characters: Lucas Simms, Moira Brown, Confessor Cromwell, Colin Moriarty, Manya Vargas, Walter

Megaton is a fictional settlement in the 2008 action role-playing game Fallout 3, created as part of the Fallout franchise by Bethesda Game Studios. It is one of the first locations that the player-controlled Lone Wanderer may encounter upon leaving the Vault 101 fallout shelter. Megaton's exterior is a cone-shaped structure with an automatic gate to protect its residents. The town is run by Lucas Simms, a mayor and sheriff who will ask the player character to help deactivate a dud nuclear warhead at the settlement's center; the player can instead choose to detonate it at the request of Allistair Tenpenny of Tenpenny Tower. The interior of Megaton is a crater with winding pathways and wooden sheds held by girders that surround the bomb, which became a center of worship for a religious faction called the Church of the Children of the Atom. Although the main quest of the game is finding their father, early on by asking Megaton's residents for clues, they can trade with local vendors and perform side quests like helping out a mechanic and vendor named Moira Brown in writing the Wasteland Survival Guide by performing various tasks at the outside world.

In the game's lore, the crater served as both a trading post and a shelter for people who needed protection from sandstorms and failed to seek refuge from Vault 101. Megaton was founded by multiple people who constructed it from the wealth they accumulated during trade and sought to build a fortified structure around the bomb for protection from hostile groups. Megaton, as the developers of Fallout 3 discussed, emphasized "quality over quantity" of non-player characters by focusing on meaningful interactions from them and limiting the quantity of them to fit the desolate wasteland setting. The localized Japanese version removed the player's ability to detonate the Megaton bomb in light of cultural sensitivities over the atomic bombings of Hiroshima and Nagasaki in Japan.

Megaton has been positively received by critics who argued that it was one of the best and most memorable locations in the Fallout series given its early game presence as well as its perceived liveliness and usefulness. While contemporary reviewers praised Megaton as an example of Fallout 3's gameplay flexibility, many retrospective sources emphasized it as one of the best and most iconic video game locations in the context of how well it fit into the philosophies of open-world gameplay design and narrative variability. Writers highlighted Moira Brown as a standout character within the settlement due to her quirky but friendly personality, her professions' usefulness, and the quests involving her guidebook. The side quest around detonating or defusing the bomb has also been described by critics as showcasing the large-scale consequences that the player character and others are exposed, with many expressing guilt for detonating the warhead and thus destroying the settlement. Academic analyses on Megaton focused on moral incentives and in-game rewards for either detonating or defusing the warhead. The bomb has also been analyzed within the wider contexts of religion and similarities to cultural works like Beneath the Planet of the Apes.

== Description ==
Concept art of Megaton by Adam Adamowicz. Note the intentional portrayals of the cluttered structural nature of Megaton's buildings and the cultlike attention to the nuclear warhead shown, being parallel to Megaton ingame.

Megaton, a fictional town located just south of the ruins of Springvale, Virginia, is a relatively large-sized settlement area within the Capital Wasteland in the 2008 action role-playing game Fallout 3, developed by Bethesda Game Studios as part of the Fallout franchise. In 2277—200 years after the United States was obliterated by a nuclear war in an alternate world history—the player character, called "Lone Wanderer" in the game, exits Vault 101 in search of their father James who fled the fallout shelter to resume a water purification project to provide radiation-free water for the area's residents. After exiting the vault, the protagonist finds Megaton while exploring. The exterior is a conical structure on a small hill surrounded by arches pointing upward towards the sky, serving as a gate. The gate is guarded by a robot that greets human visitors while protecting the area from creatures like giant ants. Once near the structure, the bulky metal sheets will automatically lift to allow entry. As opposed to the exterior cone-like shape, the interior is shaped like a large hole. Upon first entry into Megaton, Lucas Simms (a non-player character like the town's other residents), its mayor and sheriff, greets the player to ensure they do not intend to cause trouble. He also asks the player whether they could disarm a live bomb in the middle of the town. The name Megaton is derived from the undetonated bomb that Lucas asks them to defuse. Prior to the settlement's founding, wasteland survivors used the crater as a shelter to avoid sandstorms after being rejected from refuge in Vault 101. Some began to worship the bomb there, forming the Children of Atom religion. The crater eventually became a significant trading post. Several traders used their earnings to building walls around the crater to protect themselves from hostile groups like raiders and super mutants, which attracted more residents.

The town's structure is made of irregular pathways and a cluster of wooden sheds held up by girders where residents live in that surrounds a crater with a dropped atomic bomb that failed to detonate. The Church of the Children of Atom, a religious organization led by Confessor Cromwell, worships the bomb as well as a monotheistic god and personification of atomic power named Atom. Cromwell loudly preaches at the bomb site to his praying followers and baptizes himself with the nearby irradiated water. The buildings accessible to the player include townhouses, two pubs, a waterworks, a church, a hostel, an armory, a shop, and bathrooms. The Lone Wanderer can visit Colin Moriarty at his saloon to gain information regarding James' whereabouts; Moriarty redirects the player towards visiting Three Dog of Galaxy News Radio for clues. The player can interact with Manya Vargas, an elderly granddaughter of one of Megaton's founders, to hear about the settlement's history.

Vendors also reside in Megaton with whom the Lone Wanderer can exchange collected items for bottle cap-based currency. The player can pursue side quests given by the town's residents. For instance, the player character can help fix pipes for the handyman Walter at the area's water processing plant. One of the most prominent quest-givers in Megaton is Moira Brown, a quirky and cheerful vendor and mechanic who runs the Craterside Supply. She asks the protagonist to help her write a guidebook called Wasteland Survival Guide. To complete her book, Moira tasks the player with performing dangerous activities outside the town. Many of the tasks involve exploration far from Megaton and require encounters with hostiles like raiders and irradiated creatures; examples include scavenging for food and medicine or exposure to heavy amounts of radiation. Moira's quests effectively act as a "secondary tutorial" for the player that help understand game mechanics not taught during earlier game sequences in Vault 101.

The nuclear warhead at the middle of Megaton is the focus of a side quest potentially given by Lucas that the player can address. After successfully defusing it, Lucas will reward them with caps, a slight karma stat boost, and a residence within Megaton; the house can be upgraded by Moira to the player's liking and comes with a robot butler who can provide purified water and restyle the player character's hair. Alternatively, the Lone Wanderer can visit Moriarty's Saloon to talk to Mr. Burke, an employee of Allistair Tenpenny. Burke and his employer want Megaton wiped out via the warhead's detonation because they dislike seeing it from the faraway Tenpenny Tower, where they reside. If the player agrees to blow up Megaton, Burke will provide the detonator and tell the player to meet him at the tower after the bomb is set to explode. Once at the tower, the protagonist can detonate the warhead, destroying the settlement and killing nearly everyone in Megaton. The Lone Wanderer is rewarded with a payment of caps and access to a suite at the tower but loses a large amount of karma points. The only survivor of the explosion is Moira, who becomes "ghoulified" (mutated massively as a result of large amounts of radiation exposure) but is willing to forgive the Lone Wanderer and continue her guidebook. If the player chose to disarm the bomb, the player will later encounter deadly hitmen sent by Tenpenny. Likewise, if they instead destroy Megaton, hostile former residents may attempt to ambush the player as may vigilantes of the "Regulators" faction due to the player character's negative karma.

According to the epilogue of the Fallout 3 Official Game Guide, Moira in 2297 confirms that the protagonist saved Megaton from the warhead and complete her Wasteland Survival Guide, which became a popular book in the Capital Wasteland. The director of the 2024 TV adaptation, Jonathan Nolan, revealed that the Californian town Filly was largely inspired by Megaton given the "trashy" appearance of both and that the protagonists of both Fallout 3 and the TV show likely arrive at their respective areas early on.

== Development information ==
Executive producer Todd Howard originally wanted to continue Fallout 3 on the West Coast of the United States; however, Emil Pagliarulo, the game's lead designer, pushed to set the game in Washington, D.C. and the surrounding area, which they were local to and familiar with. While the game features an open world, the cities, like Megaton, are separate game worlds due to contemporary hardware limitation; when the player enters Megaton, the game transitions to a loading screen before interactions can occur. The game locations vary in density and organization from "remote bastions of life" like Megaton to the central hub Rivet City. The fewer number of NPCs reflect the harsh nature of the series' setting. Pagliarulo emphasized that they were focused on making "better NPCs" that engage in more meaningful dialogue rather small talk; for example, addressing others by name and talking more about themselves and their life goals. He cited Lucas Simms of Megaton as an example, elaborating that the player character when talking to Simms while near his son produces dialogue specifically about the child. While reminiscing about a player's satisfaction of detonating the Megaton bomb, Pagliarulo described the player's reaction as "priceless"; Howard used the discussed reaction as an example regarding how the game does not hide whether the player does something bad in-game and instead makes evil acts "visually entertaining". Bethesda Softworks' localization team changed the Japanese version of Fallout 3 to remove both Mr. Burke and the ability to destroy Megaton by activating the nuclear warhead. This was due to the cultural sensitivity regarding the atomic bombings of Hiroshima and Nagasaki in 1945 during the end of World War II, in which Japan was the only nation to have been hit by nuclear attacks.

== Reception ==
Gameplay image of the Lone Wanderer with the detonator (right) and Mr. Burke (left) at Tenpenny Tower witnessing the destruction of Megaton. This moment has been highlighted as one in which the game exposes the player to devastating consequences done by them.

Megaton has received positive attention among game critics, with Ritwik Mitra of Game Rant referring to the Fallout 3 town as "easily one of the most iconic locations in video gaming history" and one that any new player should visit. Screen Rant's Kyle Gratton said that Megaton's "odd location" made it memorable and "a big contribution to Fallout 3's world design". He also wrote that its "close proximity to certain death" (the nuclear bomb) is a good representation of the harsh life in the Capital Wasteland. Multiple game magazines had positively referenced Megaton within the context of Fallout 3, with PC Zone editor Will Porter in 2007 referring to the location as "a lovingly constructed area." In the same year of the release of Fallout 3, PlayStation Official Magazine – UK considered the quests of Megaton to be among the game's side quests that add hours to gameplay and enhance the liveliness of the setting. The magazine expressed favorability of the morality and reward for helping to defuse the bomb, including for getting the humorous robot butler Wadsworth. PlayStation: The Official Magazine in 2009 acknowledged that the game in relation to Megaton allows the player to roleplay as an "unapologetic bastard," from the "humorous" eventual death of a nearby hobo Mickey if they reject providing purified water to him to the "sadistic fun" of detonating the Megaton bomb.

Many retrospective works on Fallout 3 have positively covered Megaton in bigger detail, with Extra Lives: Why Video Games Matter by Tom Bissell recording the author's observations in its introduction that he spent a few hours exploring Megaton and getting to know of its residents and then acknowledging that in essence of open-world games, his first few hours there were in fact optional and therefore evidence of "an awesome range of narrative variability". GB Buford, writing for Kotaku, argued that the area between Vault 101 leading up to Megaton helped ease new players into the world of Fallout 3 by understanding where to go without immediate distractions. Diego Arguello of Inverse remarked that Megaton is easy to get lost in given its unconventional pathways, which he considered ironic because it was much smaller than Rivet City, another Fallout 3 location. He argued, however, the range of townsfolk make the settlement "a world of its own" despite the smaller size. Furthermore, he stated, it was "a strong example of a design philosophy that few open-world games have since managed to replicate, one in which density trumps scale, creating a sense of place that strives to be remembered", being an early example of a game that emphasized space over time as early as 2008. In comparison, he felt that neither Fallout 4 nor Fallout 76 were able to replicate the feeling of livelihood for a residential area.

Critics have praised Megaton as a thematically fitting and relatively lively area of non-player characters whom the player can interact with. Cameron Kunzelman of Vice compared Megaton to "a rusted metal flower blooming in the wasteland" where people could live normal and productive lives, citing both the Moira Brown and Lucas Simms characters. He compared it to Tenpenny Tower, in which its wealthy elite intend to remove what they saw as a new world intending to replace the old and violent world that favored the rich, pointing to the player character as having potential agency in making their goal come true. Buford of Kotaku suggested that the real highlight of Megaton is Moira Brown, acknowledging that she has been ridiculed by some players but voicing that he never understood why. He argued that she is quirky but always friendly, is the game's best mechanic early on, is a good vendor for selling items to, and has quests that provide notable in-game perks. He continued that most importantly, Moira's side quests for her guidebook are a "fantastic way to get an introduction to the world" given that her quests normally have the player going far and getting distracted by in-world events and locations, therefore both teaching the player additional in-game mechanics and encouraging them to seek out exploration. The A.V. Club writer Drew Toal discussed Vault 101 as an authoritarian location in which freedom is sacrificed in exchange for security, then comparing it to Megaton. He argued that Megaton was like "an enormous flaming trash barrel" that lacked the protections and hygiene from the fallout shelter but was "the ideal post-apocalyptic neighborhood" because of the residents depending on each other to get along. Toal felt that while Megaton had obvious flaws that it was better than the Republic of Dave (with an unstable government), Rivet City (with high amounts of classism), and Vault 101 (of which it and Megaton represented "two competing visions of society").

Megaton's nuclear bomb and the side quest have both been considered standout features of the area by writers. Buford of Kotaku said that he found the side quest involving defusing or detonating the giant bomb interesting enough. Brendan Graeber of IGN considered that witnessing the Megaton's destruction as the result of being greedy for a Tenpenny Tower luxury suite exposed him to large consequences not normally seen in many RPGs. He noted it elicited remorse for the firsthand destruction and for paying back the hospitality of the settlement with a nuclear detonation. Eurogamer editor Robert Purchese expressed that no other moment of video game destruction compared to the nuclear warhead wiping out Megaton due to "some idiot atop a tower who stood to make only a measly 1000 caps for doing so." His return to Megaton made it "the one, and only, virtual object [he had] ever felt guilty about destroying."

The Edge magazine staff wrote that the consequences behind destroying Megaton teaches players in part that one should caution taking drastic in-game choices until at least after they have done all available and relevant side quests. They felt that the game has the player question whether gaining a suite in Tenpenny Tower was worth blowing up Megaton on behalf of some evil people. The staff remarked that the game would feel emptier and worse with Megaton gone and brought up the possibility that the player would just kill everyone at Tenpenny Tower before reloading to before the Megaton bomb was detonated. TheGamer editor Jade King expressed that the bomb "acts as a compelling moral dilemma for the player to deal with" given how easy it can be used for evil. She said that on her first playthrough, she refused to have Megaton's warhead be detonated and instead chose to kill Burke because she felt that it was justified despite lacking any reward. She then said that the player character being able to see the ruins of a destroyed Megaton and a ghoulified Moira showed how Fallout 3 was unafraid of showing people how evil they could be. In another retrospective, she reflected that moral polarity of the choices regarding the Megaton bomb was a flaw in Fallout 3 but one that reflected moral systems of other game series of the time like Mass Effect and Infamous as opposed to the later games with themes around moral grayness like The Witcher 3 and Baldur's Gate 3. She additionally explained her interest in an option to sit out of the Megaton bomb conflict and see what happens to the town should a future remaster or remake come out.

=== Academic analysis ===
Megaton and its nuclear bomb have also been the focus of several academic works. Marcus Schulzke, writing for the journal Game Studies, considered the side quest regarding the Megaton bomb to be entertaining but criticized it for the rewards being too parallel in experience points and residency along with the karma points given for disarming the bomb being disproportionately low compared to the massive karma loss for detonating it. Daniel Singleton, dedicating a chapter of a book to video games and science fiction, highlighted that while Fallout 3 intended to showcase the effects of nuclear destruction on the world, players can "transform" nuclear weapons into their own personal toys and decide how they want to use it. He elaborated that many players may choose to detonate the bomb just to see what happens before reloading the game to defuse it and continue on afterward.

James Schirmer, writing a chapter on morality in Fallout 3, pointed out that Megaton's side quest around the bomb is likely the first opportunity presented for the player to shift their in-game karma points and suggested that it had similarities to the post-apocalyptic social science fiction novel A Canticle for Leibowitz on the basis of the connection between religion and science. He suggested that the cult-like worship of the nuclear warhead in Megaton by the local members of the Church of the Children of the Atom was likely a reference to the science fiction film Beneath the Planet of the Apes, which similarly features humans worshiping an unexploded atomic bomb. Furthermore, he wrote that although the religious group viewed the bomb as a "creative and unifying holy element" that their deaths do not negate the negative karma gained from detonating it because of the non-cult members that the Lone Wanderer would also kill in the process. Lars De Wildt and his fellow coauthors, writing for the journal Religions, analyzed the Church of the Children of Atom, providing context of the post-war religious faction being formed based on the belief that the 2077 nuclear devastation was a holy event by their god Atom. They discussed further lore context where the faction, formed in Megaton by Fallout 3, had attained a popular following throughout the United States as seen in Fallout 4. Atom as worshiped by Cromwell and the rest of the Church of the Children of Atom, they stated, was "omnipresent, omniscient and omnipotent" and was described as a "masculine, incomprehensibly opaque deification of atomic power". The religious nature of Oasis in comparison, they continued, contrasted with that of Megaton in that the romantic spiritual cult there called the Treeminders worship nature in the form of a talking tree called "The Great One", who himself is mortal and can be killed by the Lone Wanderer.

Dan Staines of the University of New South Wales was more critical of the content of Megaton, considering both Simms and Burke to lack enough emotional depth beyond being moral opposites for the player to be personally invested in either character and especially criticizing the latter as being cartoonishly evil to the point that good-aligned role-players have no real reason to engage with him. He also acknowledged Cromwell as a kooky character and a "parody of real-life street-corner evangelists", considering him to be a slightly more interesting, albeit narratively "underdeveloped", individual of the location because he does not attempt to sway the player character on what to do with the nuclear warhead. Staines argued that although the characters of Megaton do have a personality, players cannot personally relate to them due to a lack of reason for such, that a character's motives or actions are connected more to gameplay quests and rewards than narrative. He also criticized the quest involving the Megaton bomb as too "stark[ly] black and white" in morality, which he suggested left no moral ambiguity. In comparison, he continued, another Fallout 3 location called the Oasis made a better case for moral ambiguity.
