= Tenpenny Tower =

Fictional building

- Fallout location
- Tenpenny Tower as it appears in Fallout 3
- First appearance: Fallout 3 (2008)
- Genre: Action role-playing game

In-universe information
- Location: Virginia, United States
- Characters: Allistair Tenpenny, Mr. Burke, Roy Phillips (conditionally)

Tenpenny Tower is a fictional building in the 2008 action role-playing game Fallout 3, created as part of the Fallout franchise by Bethesda Game Studios. Previously a luxury resort prior to a nuclear war that devastated much of the Earth, it was revived by British immigrant Allistair Tenpenny and his right-hand man Mister Burke as a residence for wealthy and non-irradiated humans within the former Washington metropolitan area, now known as the Capital Wasteland. Tenpenny Tower's area is kept strictly guarded and intentionally bars "ghoulified" individuals due to bigotry, general distrust, and their mutated appearances. One quest revolves around a conflict in which Roy Phillips and his gang of ghouls are kept out of the building by security chief Gustavo. The player character can resolve the situation by either killing the ghouls on behalf of Gustavo, killing all the human residents for Roy, or negotiating for a peaceful solution in which bigoted human denizens are removed from the hotel and Allistair Tenpenny is convinced to allow the ghouls to live in his complex. While the short-term solution for the last option appears to hold at first, a later return reveals that Roy and the other ghouls slaughtered nearly all the human residents and hid their bodies in the basement. Another questline involves the detonation of a nuclear warhead at Megaton on behalf of Mr. Burke and, depending on the outcome of the other quest, either Allistair Tenpenny or Roy Phillips. Fallout 3 lead designer Emil Pagliarulo stated that Tenpenny Tower was directly inspired by a wealthy-only hotel in the post-apocalyptic movie Land of the Dead, and purposefully was designed to not have any best ending in the human-ghoul conflict quest to showcase the harshness of the game world.

Tenpenny Tower's two main side quests have been positively received by game critics for the representation of elitism in the game's world and ethical choices (or lack thereof) presented to the player. The human-ghoul conflict from the Tenpenny Tower questline has been well-covered by many academic sources, many authors of whom closely studied the extent of player agency and the subversion of a seemingly best outcome leading to bloodshed that was likely not intended by the player. Multiple of them have also connected the quest to themes of discrimination and bigotry, weight of karma in-game, and ethical solutions that may not work out as well in more dystopian worlds like that of the Fallout series.

== Appearance and development ==
Concept art of Tenpenny Tower by Adam Adamowicz. As seen ingame and in the concept art, the gated structure surrounds the Tenpenny Tower and its surrounding area to keep out unwanted people and creatures to protect its wealthy inhabitants.

Tenpenny Tower is a large-sized apartment complex at the Capital Wasteland, an alternate timeline setting of a nuclear-devastated United States, in the 2008 action role-playing game Fallout 3, developed by Bethesda Game Studios as part of the Fallout franchise. It is named after its current owner Allistair Tenpenny and serves as a luxury hotel and the sole residential building of a desert. The hotel served as a luxury resort until the nuclear war of 2077, leading to its subsequent closure until its eventual revival by Tenpenny. The building itself is fortified and protected by security gates that keep out unwanted outsiders. To enter the tower's area, a visitor has to talk to the complex's head of security Chief Gustavo from the gate's intercom for access. When the player character, known as the Lone Wanderer, arrives at the Tenpenny Tower's outside area the first time, a ghoul (extremely irradiated human) named Roy Phillips can be speaking to the intercom, demanding that he and his fellow ghouls be allowed to live in the building. Gustavo can be heard making anti-ghoul slurs against him and again rejecting his request. Roy then vows to achieve his aim of getting himself and the other ghouls inside and leaves. The first time onwards, the Lone Wanderer will have to talk to the head of security via intercom to be allowed inside the Tenpenny Tower's vicinity.

The residents of Tenpenny Tower are non-mutated humans who pay to rent living spaces. The complex consists of shops on the bottom floor, living quarters in high-level floors, and a high society-only for upper class residents on an upper floor. Above all the previous floors is one owned by Allistair Tenpenny, the private chambers connecting to a balcony. Ghouls are specifically excluded from Tenpenny's society to ensure that "unhealthy" individuals are not mixed in with the "healthier" ones. Allistair Tenpenny was a British refugee who arrived in the United States seeking fortune, a goal he later achieved as the Tenpenny Tower's landlord and owner. Tenpenny, when talked to by the Lone Wanderer, reveals that he knew of the potential behind the then-abandoned complex and hired musclemen to polish the place. He continued that he had the "great fortune" to run into his "absolute gem" of an assistant Mister Burke for his capability in completing his tasks. Finally, he said, he had to then find the "right type of tenants with the right type of assets" to lead to the upper-class life of his tower". Tenpenny Tower's area is guarded by a security force equipped with unique armor. Allistair Tenpenny can be found at his balcony, using his rifle to shoot at wasteland creatures from afar.

Tenpenny Tower is involved in multiple side quests that the player character can help to fulfill. The main side quest of the location can be started either by talking to Chief Gustavo at the hotel or Roy Phillips at a hideout in a subway station called Warrington station. Should Gustavo be talked to first, he will task the Lone Wanderer with killing Roy and other ghoul members of his gang at the metro station. Should the player choose to kill Roy and his gang, they can talk to Gustavo for their reward of bottle caps, a form of currency. Alternatively, the Lone Wanderer can talk to Roy, who will ask them to find a solution allowing them to eventually move into Tenpenny Tower. Two of the solutions to help Roy involve violence while one is a more peaceful solution. The first solution to this straightforward, involving the player character killing all of the tower's residents by themself. The second solution has the Lone Wanderer unlock a generator-basement at Tenpenny Tower to allow feral ghouls in, killing all the human residents in the process. The third and final solution is for the player to negotiate with the residents of Tenpenny Tower to allow the ghouls from the station to reside at the hotel. The player character has to deal with five residents of the complex, who all can be convinced to exile themselves because of their anti-ghoul stances. Afterward, they can talk to Allistair Tenpenny to convince him to allow the ghouls to live at his hotel. Later, the ghouls from the station and the original human residents can both be found peacefully coexisting at Tenpenny Tower. Upon returning to the location a few in-game days later, however, the Lone Wanderer can find that only the ghoul residents are still around. Should the player character unlock the building's basement, they can find all of the corpses of the former human residents who have been stripped of their contents. When confronted by them over the deaths of the human residents, Roy Phillips explains that the humans and ghouls supposedly had a "disagreement", leading him to decide to "take out the trash". Regardless of the option taken to help Roy, he will reward the player with bottle caps and a ghoul mask, which if worn will make feral ghouls friendly to the player character. The only human resident who ends up surviving the massacre is Mr. Burke.

Another side quest that the Tenpenny Tower leadership is involved in is in another location called Megaton, a settlement built around a nuclear bomb. While the quest presents the option of disarming it on behalf of the people of Megaton, the Lone Wanderer can alternatively visit Moriarty’s Saloon to meet Burke there. Mr. Burke informs the player character that the nuclear warhead in Megaton can be set up to detonate and therefore destroy the settlement itself and kill nearly everyone there in the process. He then hands a detonator to the Lone Wanderer and asks them to rig the bomb then meet him at Tenpenny Tower. The reasoning for Allistair Tenpenny's interest in seeing Megaton explode was that he found it to be eyesore while watching the outside world and therefore wanted it gone. Should the player character choose to side with Burke and Tenpenny in destroying Megaton by detonating the bomb from Tenpenny Tower, the player character will be rewarded with bottle caps and a suite near Allistair Tenpenny's space but will lose massive amounts of in-game karma points in the process. If the player character chose to do the quest after Roy Phillips and his gang had taken over Tenpenny Tower, the player character will find that Roy Phillips and Burke discussing common ground on destroying Megaton before allowing the player character to do so.

=== Development information ===
Nate Purkeypile, an environmental artist for Fallout 3, was the designer behind Tenpenny Tower. In a 2008 interview with 1Up Network, Fallout 3 lead designer Emil Pagliarulo said that Tenpenny Tower was inspired by a fictional skyscraper in the 2005 post-apocalyptic horror movie Land of the Dead called "Fiddler's Green", where the rich and powerful lived in isolation from zombies and the rest of the vulnerable population. He also said that the location was a chance for the developers to introduce Allistair Tenpenny as a character originally from outside the United States. He elaborated that his background of coming from the United Kingdom and later immigrating to the United States was meant to implicate the likely desolate state of the European continent, alluding to the state of the world outside the United States while leaving further details to the imagination of players. Additionally, the developers intentionally left out any "happy ending" outcome for Tenpenny Tower because they intended to portray the Capital Wasteland as a "brutal place" where "not everything is black and white".

== Reception and analysis ==
The side quests involving Tenpenny Tower have received praise from gaming journalists. Cameron Kunzelman of Vice, suggested that whereas Megaton is a place where regular people could thrive and represents construction of a new world, Tenpenny Tower is a "beacon of evil" where the wealthy thrive and represents the old and violent world. Thus, he explained, the player character's choice in the Megaton bomb quest determines which kind of world they would prefer. The Edge magazine staff questioned whether gaining a suite from Tenpenny Tower by destroying the entirety of Megaton from the nuclear warhead's detonation was worth it, arguing that the game felt worse and emptier without the settlement. Devin Friend of Game Rant said that Tenpenny Tower was one of the "nicest-looking places in the wasteland" but that its owner is an "absolutely terrible person" who was rightfully marked by the game as very evil in karma. He, however, criticized the game marking Roy Phillips as having good karma as one of the game's "most baffling details" due to his deep bigotry against humans proven by his actions like choosing to slaughter the Tenpenny Tower residents shortly after moving in and egging on the destruction of Megaton. He suggested that Roy should have shared the very evil karma in-game listing with his counterpart Allistair. The New Gamer writer D. Riley considered Tenpenny Tower to be "the setting of a morality play as good as any we've seen in gaming", continuing that his sympathy for the subway ghouls did not make him feel that the slaughter of the original hotel's residents were really justified because they never harmed anyone. They argued that while Roy believed he was fighting for ghoul rights, his subsequent seizure of power proved his hypocrisy and ultimately bigoted intentions. Riley expressed their wish that they left Tenpenny Tower alone and acknowledged that Fallout 3 managed to make them feel uncomfortable about their own agency over the land.

The Tenpenny Tower questline involving the ghouls has been discussed by various academic sources. Evan Watts of Women's Studies Quarterly highlighted the wide options for solving the human-ghoul conflict there as an example of how the game presents the player with vast amounts of options instead of forcing them into a particular playstyle. James Schirmer, writing a chapter on morality in Fallout 3, noted that Tenpenny Tower is one of the human settlements that is permanently affected by the player's choices and highlighted the option to negotiate to allow the ghouls to settle into Tenpenny Tower peacefully as a seemingly "idealistic" path in which people put aside prejudice and the violence that comes with it to coexist with others. He argued that the eventual outcome of the supposedly peaceful path would have cheapened the good karma earned from the initial quest completion, citing D. Riley's explanation that despite the Lone Wanderer driving out the bigoted residents and encouraging others to accept coexistence, innocent people ended up dying in the end. Schirmer then wrote that the quest could be followed from a path of "post-apocalyptic neutrality", in which the player does not involve themselves in the affairs of others. Gerald Farca, dedicating his book to dystopian video games, wrote about Tenpenny Tower and potential solutions between its human residents and the outsider ghouls at his introduction as an instance of "emancipatory potential" where the player is creatively engaged for a slim potential of an ethical solution. The author explains that to solve the quest by engaging with the game in a "multi-faceted form of play" connecting between literally interacting with the game world and figuratively using their imagination. He stated that the concept of play, where the player can connect the game world to real life and therefore act within the former in such contexts, can be illustrated from Tenpenny Tower's exclusion of ghouls in comparison with the Mexico–United States border wall to keep out Mexican immigration and marginalize minorities and anti-immigration sentiment against Syrian refugees in European countries like Poland and Hungary amidst the Syrian Civil War.

Hans-Joachim Backe and Espen Aarseth, for the Proceedings of DiGRA 2013 Conference, considered the Tenpenny Tower quest to be "one of the most intricate examinations of zombies in any game to date". They remarked that the quest connects to the "racist subtext" of the zombie horror film Night of the Living Dead because of the death as a concept threatening the idea of consumerism. The two authors compared the ghouls to the disenfranchised and Tenpenny Tower to a "symbol of wealth and commodified happiness", given that the former enacts the "stereotypical zombie-behavior that humans associate with their appearance" by threatening open violence to achieve their goals of entering the building. This, Backe and Aarseth explained, meant that the game conveyed both the humans and the ghouls as "equally xenophobic, segregationist, and morally questionable". They also said that while the compromise from negotiations presents a short-term victory that the ghouls destroy such work from the player character, leading the player to explore their own morality based on their reaction to the long-term outcome. Moritz Wischert-Zielke of New American Studies Journal commented on Allistair Tenpenny being a "stereotypical colonial patriarch" who manages a "group of mostly White characters pay large amounts of money for their residence in the gated community". He argued that this represents a social structure favoring whiteness in the post-apocalyptic world with the racialization in Fallout 3 being solely represented by "anti-Ghoulism" on the bases of them all being supposedly dirty, dangerous, cannibalistic, and/or inhuman. He added that because of the xenophobic and "morally questionable" ideologies of Roy, the player choosing to side with them does not mean that they attain any higher moral ground than if they sided with Tenpenny Tower's security against the ghouls.

Matthias Kemmer, for a book chapter about Fallout 3, recognized Tenpenny Tower as "an obvious homage to George A. Romero's Land of the Dead but also noted that despite having the financial capabilities to do so, the ghouls could not leverage their financial statuses to be allowed there. He wrote that Tenpenny Tower's quest serves as a reminder to the limits of political negotiations as demonstrated by some residents leaving because they refuse to accept the status quo changing and the security chief's bigotry against ghouls based on their physical appearances. The situation, he said, could be compared to real-life historical segregation where African Americans were long separated from White Americans and discriminated against because of their skin color but addresses themes of racism through the human-ghoul conflict instead of skin-based racism unlike in real life. Joan Casas-Roma and Joan Arnedo-Moreno, coauthors on a book chapter focusing on in-game acts of morality, similarly discussed the initially peaceful option and the good karma being gained from the path's completion without being negated upon the reveal of the ultimate outcome. They interpreted the lack of karma loss from the player character seemingly unintentionally and indirectly causing the deaths of the human denizens as the game still recognizing the player for having chosen a "good path" for the quest even if the unforeseen consequences ended up being bad. This, they justified, made the moral system of the Fallout series stand out in comparison to other video games.

Games and Culture writer Frank G. Bosman recalled when he pursued the path to negotiations to allow the ghouls into the complex and felt that he was "rather smart" for finding a peaceful option only to eventually react with shock to the unintended consequences of the supposed "ideal outcome" given that the ghouls decided to slaughter the others. The Tenpenny Tower, to the author, was an example of "ethical gameplay", defined by when the player comes a morally difficult problem to solve to progress with gameplay. Bosman observed that the moral problems within the Tenpenny Tower quest are highlighted from tenants being "human supremacists" but correctly fearing the potentially malicious intentions of the ghoul outsiders and the ghouls having the right to protest against injustices, causing the player to have to consider balancing the moral claims of the two factions before making a decision. He said that when the player discovers the long-term outcomes of coexistence, they would likely react with mixed emotions. The game's karma system, as Bosman stated, rewards the player for their negotiation efforts leading to temporary coexistence but does not shift from the long-term consequences. In addition, he commented, there is no "ideal" outcome in the quest and the player can potentially miss the "unideal" outcome of the negotiation path if they chose not to revisit Tenpenny Tower.

Sari Piittinen, writing for the journal New Media & Society, analyzed the reactions of Let’s Play players to the Tenpenny Tower questline and observed that whether or not they help the ghouls to peacefully move in is based on whether they are roleplaying as a player character with villainous or heroic tendencies. One of the Let's Players, roleplaying as a villainous character, chose not to help the ghouls but recognized them as a "persecuted group" and therefore self-reflected on his own morality. He asserted that Let's Players who chose the negotiation path never questioned the morality of trying to remove bigoted Tenpenny residents because they saw them as "tyrannical Gothic villains who misuse power in unjust ways and must be punished". He continued on to explain that since Let's Players typically assumed the ghoul gang to be an innocent, the outcome of the human residents eventually being killed results in negative reactions from the players due to the sense of betrayal to their acts of kindness. Another Let's Player, for instance, had his limit reached in reaction to the events, said "Oh, that's it" as an outburst, kills Roy Phillips, and then justifies his own actions as retribution for the deceased human residents. He dismisses the karma loss from killing Roy and then complains that Tenpenny Tower became useless in-game because of all the human vendors being dead. Piittinen then suggested that the ghouls upon taking over the Tenpenny Tower "arguably upset the typical Gothic relationship of tyrannical villains and their blameless victims of injustice", and Roy was as "dislikeable and offensive" as the "snobbery and rudeness" of Tenpenny Tower's residents.

Miguel Sicart, seeking to define the application of ethical cognitive friction, used Tenpenny Tower as an example of a "classic ethical dilemma" and defined it as having been "built as an illusion and ruled by fear". He recalled how despite hearing the requests of the humans of Tenpenny and the ghouls of the metro station to exterminate each other, he chose to pursue the "golden mean" and initially thought that he managed to achieve a humanitarian solution to the crisis. When he found out otherwise, however, he felt that the world became a suspicious place and felt morally lost because of the line between right and wrong being blurred. He reflected that he should have thought in hindsight about how even the most ethical solutions may not be the best ones in a world where there is not a "most ethical solution". Sicart then argued that the ethical cognitive friction comes in context of the player lacking the same kind of moral compass rooted within the Capital Wasteland and probably lacking further information over the outcomes of their in-game decisions. His colleague, video game developer Manveer Heir, shared to him in 2010, "Fallout 3’s Tenpenny Tower quest was a huge moment for me as a player and something I will remember forever. The way the 'right' solution still ended with a bad outcome and the effect it had on me, making me extremely angry at virtual characters and wanting revenge on them, are emotions I've never felt towards non-humans before. That the game could incite such emotion within me by defying expectation is an amazing example of the power of the medium and something I'm fully interested in exploring further." Sicart argued that the Tenpenny Tower quest was a wicked problem (where a problem is difficult to impossible to solve because of its incomplete and challenging nature), in which only the vague karma system, in-game statements from characters, and the player's own characters rather than overarching values can lead the player character to any potential solution.
