= Music of the Fallout series =

Music from the video game series Fallout

The Fallout series sources licensed music originally released on a wide variety of audio formats. All formats are sized to scale. The song titles are noted with subscript captions. Click on the format to load the appropriate article.

The music soundtrack of the Fallout series is composed of both licensed music from the mid-century's Jazz Age to the Space Age, as well as original scores by Mark Morgan, Matt Gruber, Devin Townsend, Inon Zur, and Ramin Djawadi. The series also features original songs and covers commissioned for the games as diegetic music heard in the world of Fallout.

Much of the licensed music used in the Fallout series includes popular hits recorded in the 1940s and 1950s in accordance with its atompunk retrofuturistic setting influenced by the post-war culture of 1950s United States in a post-apocalyptic version of the 21st, 22nd and 23rd centuries. However, with the introduction of 2010's Fallout: New Vegas, the Fallout series has also featured licensed recordings from each of nine consecutive decades from the 1920s to the 2000s.

== Fallout ==
Fallout: The Soundtrack

Soundtrack album by Mark Morgan
- Released: 30 September 1997
- Recorded: c. 1997
- Genres: Video game music, Dark ambient, Industrial
- Length: 56:17

The original score for Fallout was composed by Mark Morgan as an ambient album and includes samples and remixes from other works. The score was released on CD by Interplay Productions in 1997. A selection of tracks was released to fans for free on May 10, 2010, as part of the Vault Archives album.

Fallout: The Soundtrack
No.	Title	Length
1.	"Metallic Monks"	3:27
2.	"Desert Wind"	3:23
3.	"A Trader's Life"	4:06
4.	"The Vault of the Future"	4:04
5.	"Industrial Junk"	3:27
6.	"Moribund World"	3:06
7.	"Vats of Goo"	3:21
8.	"City of the Dead"	3:27
9.	"Second Chance"	4:06
10.	"Underground Troubles"	3:56
11.	"City of Lost Angels"	3:49
12.	"Followers' Credo"	3:01
13.	"Radiation Storm"	4:00
14.	"Acolytes of a New God"	3:20
15.	"Flame of the Ancient World"	3:10
16.	"Khans of New California"	3:19

== Fallout 2 ==
Fallout 2: The Soundtrack

Soundtrack album by Mark Morgan
- Released: September 30, 1998
- Recorded: c. 1998
- Genres: Video game music, Dark ambient
- Length: 58:20

The original score for Fallout 2 was composed by Mark Morgan as an ambient album and includes samples and remixes from other works as well as previous tracks from Fallout. The score was released on CD by Interplay Productions in 1998. A selection of tracks was released to fans for free on May 10, 2010, as part of the Vault Archives album.

Fallout 2: The Soundtrack
No.	Title	Length
1.	"A Trader's Life"	4:06
2.	"Moribund World"	3:06
3.	"Khans of New California"	3:19
4.	"Desert Wind"	3:23
5.	"Vats of Goo"	3:21
6.	"City of Lost Angels"	3:49
7.	"Industrial Junk"	3:27
8.	"Underground Troubles"	3:56
9.	"City of the Dead"	3:27
10.	"Follower's Credo"	3:01
11.	"Beyond the Canyon"	3:17
12.	"Dream Town"	3:19
13.	"Biggest Little City in the World"	3:18
14.	"My Chrysalis Highwayman"	1:10
15.	"Many Contrasts"	3:58
16.	"All-Clear Signal"	3:20
17.	"California Revisited"	1:35
18.	"Gold Slouch"	3:28

== Fallout 3 ==
Fallout 3 (Original Game Soundtrack)

Soundtrack album by Inon Zur
- Released: October 28, 2008
- Genre: Video game music
- Length: 1:25:49

The original score for Fallout 3 was composed by Inon Zur as an orchestral album. The score was officially released on the iTunes digital store.

The Fallout 3 score was also released several times as a vinyl LP. In 2015 coinciding with the release of Fallout 4, a 14-track picture disc version of the Fallout 3 score was released through Hot Topic. It was reissued as a single LP in 2017 through ThinkGeek. In addition, record label Spacelab9 released a complete 29-track box set for the Fallout 3 score. In 2019, this was reissued as a 10th Anniversary Ultimate Edition which also included the licensed music LP Galaxy News Radio - Radio Selections from the Fallout 3 Soundtrack.

Fallout 3 (Original Game Soundtrack)
No.	Title	Length
1.	"Main Title"	2:04
2.	"New World, New Order"	1:34
3.	"Lockstep"	1:37
4.	"Price of Honor"	1:40
5.	"Fortress"	1:41
6.	"Unwelcome Guest"	3:38
7.	"Ambush"	3:29
8.	"Never Surrender"	2:03
9.	"Metal on Metal"	3:28
10.	"Behemoth"	2:43
11.	"Think Fast, Shoot Faster"	3:00
12.	"Chance to Hit"	3:00
13.	"Forgotten"	3:34
14.	"Clues in the Darkness"	3:25
15.	"No Way Out But Through"	3:38
16.	"Out of Service"	3:36
17.	"The Ferals"	3:16
18.	"Gotta Start Somewhere"	2:03
19.	"Old Lands, New Frontiers"	3:28
20.	"Pieces of the Past"	3:25
21.	"City of Ruin"	4:04
22.	"Wandering the Wastes"	3:26
23.	"Ashes and Sand"	2:48
24.	"What Remains"	3:32
25.	"Place of Refuge"	2:37
26.	"The Smallest Hope"	2:44
27.	"The Caravans"	3:31
28.	"Megaton"	3:27
29.	"A Stranger in Town"	3:18

Fallout 3 also features a licensed soundtrack largely from the 40s and 50s which is broadcast as diegetic music on the in-game radio stations: Galaxy News Radio, Enclave Radio, and the Vault 101 PA System. According to the game's credits, the radio features songs from Decca (Geffen), Columbia (Brunswick), King (De Luxe), and RCA Victor Records. Several songs were licensed from Soundies Inc. which had digitized songs from transcription discs made available to the public for the first time. The Ink Spots song "Maybe" was reprised from the 1997 release of Fallout.

Portions of the licensed Fallout 3 soundtrack have been released on official compilation albums. A 5-song sampler CD of the licensed soundtrack and the score was given as a pre-order bonus for Fallout 3 at GameStop retailers. The CD was styled as a 45 rpm record from the game's radio station, Galaxy News Radio. In 2019, a 10-song sampler LP Galaxy News Radio - Radio Selections from the Fallout 3 Soundtrack was released by Spacelab9 with Googie-inspired cover art also styled after Galaxy News Radio; it was released as a standalone LP or bundled with the 10th Anniversary Fallout 3 score boxset. Three songs were not publicly issued on vinyl before. Due to licensing restrictions, the LP features the later 1947 version of Billie Holiday's "Easy Living" released under Decca Records with the Bob Haggart orchestra instead of the in-game 1937 version of Billie Holiday's "Easy Living" released under Brunswick Records with the Teddy Wilson orchestra.

Certain songs were used in promotional material, but not in the game itself. The Fallout 3 cinematic trailer presented at E3 2008 on July 15 featured the Bing Crosby cover of "Dear Hearts and Gentle People" which was omitted from the rest of the Bing Crosby songs used in the final game. "Dear Hearts and Gentle People" would later be included with the other Bing Crosby songs in 2015's Fallout 4 and 2018's Fallout 76. Warner Chappell Production Music provided the opening track for the live-action portion of the trailer, "Picnic Prattle" composed by Cyril Watters. The rest of the E3 gameplay demonstration featured instrumental songs from Enclave Radio.

== Fallout: New Vegas ==
Fallout New Vegas: Original Game Soundtrack

Soundtrack album by Inon Zur (tracks 1-35) & Various
- Released: October 9, 2010
- Genre: Video game music
- Length: 2:18:37

The original score for Fallout: New Vegas was composed by Inon Zur as an orchestral album. The game also reprises several Mark Morgan score pieces from the Fallout 1 and 2 soundtracks as listed above. The score was officially released on the iTunes digital store.

Fallout New Vegas: Original Game Soundtrack
No.	Title	Music	Length
1.	"Main Title"		2:03
2.	"The Doctor is In"		0:29
3.	"Howdy Partner"		3:55
4.	"Wasteland Justice"		2:16
5.	"Mutant Massacre"		4:11
6.	"No Rest for These Bones"		4:08
7.	"Industrial De-Evolution"		4:01
8.	"Not My Vault"		3:58
9.	"Primm and Proper"		4:03
10.	"Knock On My Cazador"		4:10
11.	"Jacobstown Ladder"		3:58
12.	"CCC Doesn't Work for Free"		4:02
13.	"Marcus Needs a Favor"		4:01
14.	"Mountaintop Movement"		4:05
15.	"Beneath the Streets"		3:52
16.	"Garden of Evil"		4:06
17.	"The Courier Walks Softly"		4:05
18.	"Under the Stars"		4:03
19.	"TCB in Freeside"		4:09
20.	"Out of Business"		3:58
21.	"Subterranean Meltdown"		4:00
22.	"Rubble of the Forgotten"		3:55
23.	"The Gangs of Las Vegas"		1:47
24.	"Junkies in the Trunk"		4:05
25.	"Boys and Ghouls"		4:17
26.	"The Two Headed Bear"		3:58
27.	"Battle for the City"		2:19
28.	"Rocket to Repconn"		4:01
29.	"Thorn in my Side"		4:12
30.	"Blood and the Bull"		4:21
31.	"Hail Caesar"		4:22
32.	"Righteous Republic"		4:04
33.	"The Viper's Sting"		2:24
34.	"Monsters of the Mojave"		4:16
35.	"Dam Nation"		4:05
36.	"Begin Again"	Stephanie Dowling & Justin Bell	2:10
37.	"Home on the Wastes"	Josh Sawyer & Nathaniel Chapman	2:31
38.	"New Vegas Valley"	Josh Sawyer & James Melilli	1:59
39.	"Streets of New Reno"	Josh Sawyer & Nathaniel Chapman	2:18

The 2010 downloadable content Dead Money features two musician characters, Dean Domino and Vera Keyes. Dean Domino can perform the song "Saw Her Yesterday", a retitled and unedited clip of Bing Crosby's "Something's Gotta Give", previously featured on the main game's radio station. Additional song titles are mentioned, but are unplayable. Vera Keyes sings an original composition, "Begin Again", which serves as the "theme song" of the downloadable content. The song was produced by various members of the Obsidian developer staff: Vera Keyes is voiced by art intern Stephanie Dowling (née Stephanie DeBrule, original credit) with music by Justin Bell, sound designer. Chris Avellone, creative lead, and Mikey Dowling, audio producer, wrote the lyrics. The song "Begin Again" was featured again on the Mysterious Broadcast radio tied to the 2011 downloadable content Old World Blues. The Bethesda blog released an official download in 2011 followed by official sheet music for the song in 2012.

Certain songs were used in promotional material, but were not used in the game itself. The 1950 song "Orange Colored Sky" by Nat King Cole was featured in a television commercial promoting Fallout: New Vegas in 2010. The song was not included in the final game, but would be featured in 2015's Fallout 4 and 2018's Fallout 76 as well as 2024's Fallout TV series.

== Fallout 4 ==
=== Original score ===
Fallout 4: Original Game Soundtrack

Soundtrack album by Inon Zur
- Released: November 6, 2015
- Genre: Video game music
- Length: 3:37:44

The original score for Fallout 4 was composed by Inon Zur as an orchestral album. The score was officially released on the iTunes digital store.

The Fallout 4 score was also released several times as a vinyl LP. In 2016, a 8-track picture disc version of the Fallout 4 score was released through GameStop and ThinkGeek. In addition, record label Spacelab9 released a complete 65-track box set for the Fallout 4 score.

An additional digital EP was officially released on iTunes in 2015 featuring the original covers sung by Lynda Carter in the game, covered more fully below.

Fallout 4: Original Game Soundtrack
No.	Title	Length
1.	"Fallout 4 Main Theme"	3:02
2.	"The Commonwealth"	4:10
3.	"Of Green and Grey"	4:46
4.	"Portal to the Past"	3:37
5.	"Standoff"	2:12
6.	"Combat Ready"	2:02
7.	"Deeper and Darker"	3:45
8.	"Wandering - The Blasted Forest, Pt. 1"	1:29
9.	"Brightness Calling"	4:58
10.	"Of the People, for the People"	5:01
11.	"Hope Remains"	4:19
12.	"Wandering - The Blasted Forest, Pt. 2"	1:58
13.	"Predator and Prey"	2:06
14.	"War in the Wastes"	3:09
15.	"Time to Die"	2:13
16.	"Uninvited"	4:19
17.	"Wandering - The City, Pt. 1"	2:55
18.	"Rebuild, Renew"	6:11
19.	"Concrete Mysteries"	4:23
20.	"Tread Carefully"	4:37
21.	"The Infiltrator"	2:23
22.	"No Quarter"	2:54
23.	"Wandering - The City, Pt. 2"	2:28
24.	"The Vigilant"	3:36
25.	"The Warlord"	1:43
26.	"Red Brick, Broken"	4:22
27.	"Lonely Walls"	4:16
28.	"Wandering - The City, Pt. 3"	3:51
29.	"Regrouped, Reloaded"	2:06
30.	"V.A.T.S. or Die"	2:19
31.	"Wandering - The Foothills, Pt. 1"	3:52
32.	"Darkness Falls"	4:20
33.	"War of Wills"	3:20
34.	"Wandering - The Foothills, Pt. 2"	2:21
35.	"Only One Survives"	2:06
36.	"A Critical Chance"	1:57
37.	"Dust & Danger"	3:21
38.	"Liberty Lives"	3:18
39.	"Lost Boston"	3:58
40.	"Wandering - The Foothills, Pt. 3"	2:27
41.	"Honor & Steel"	4:15
42.	"We Are Unstoppable"	2:05
43.	"Dominant Species"	2:01
44.	"Explore and Discover"	4:28
45.	"Wandering - The Glowing Sea, Pt. 1"	3:28
46.	"The Stars My Solace"	4:16
47.	"Imagine Utopia"	2:52
48.	"Lone Wandering"	4:23
49.	"Wandering - The Glowing Sea, Pt. 2"	2:05
50.	"The Last Mariner"	5:24
51.	"Echoes of the Dead"	2:07
52.	"Enough is Enough"	2:17
53.	"Wandering - The Coast, Pt. 1"	1:54
54.	"Humanity's Hope"	3:05
55.	"Endless Ocean, Endless Dreams"	5:33
56.	"No Voices, No Cries"	2:12
57.	"Wandering - The Coast, Pt. 2"	3:56
58.	"Covert Action"	3:33
59.	"Rise and Prevail"	2:14
60.	"No More Sails"	4:19
61.	"Wandering - The Coast, Pt.3"	3:33
62.	"In This Together"	4:46
63.	"Still Standing"	4:02
64.	"Science & Secrecy"	3:57
65.	"Fallout 4 Main Theme ('Spinner Mix')"	2:49

=== Licensed soundtrack ===
Fallout 4 also features a licensed soundtrack which is broadcast as diegetic music on the in-game radio stations. A number of atomic and nuclear themed novelty songs were added to the soundtrack when audio director Mark Lampert was shown and become interested in "a pocket of music that [he] hadn't heard before" and as a 1950s commentary of "there's almost a naiveté to the lyrics in these songs – as if these were children playing with something [atomic weapons] they didn't understand." Lynda Carter also provides original songs for the character Magnolia which can be optionally unlocked and added to the game's main radio station, Diamond City Radio. In total in addition to 5 songs from Magnolia, 25 songs are new to the Fallout series radio with 12 songs being reprised.

=== Original songs and covers ===
Fallout 4 (Original Game Soundtrack) - EP

Soundtrack album by Lynda Carter, John Jarvis, Kerry Marx
- Released: November 6, 2015
- Genre: Video game music
- Length: 15:10

Certain songs may be optionally unlocked by completing an in-game task. Upon completion the character Magnolia can have her songs added to the Diamond City Radio setlist. Actress and singer Lynda Carter provided the voice for Magnolia in addition to writing the songs along with songwriter John Barlow Jarvis and guitarist Kerry Marx. Session players from Nashville included director/drummer Paul Leim and horn player "Blue Lou" Marini. The 5 songs were officially released as a digital EP on the iTunes digital store.

Fallout 4 (Original Game Soundtrack) - EP
No.	Title	Length
1.	"I'm the One You're Looking for"	3:25
2.	"Baby It's Just You"	2:33
3.	"Good Neighbor"	3:35
4.	"Man Enough"	3:23
5.	"Train Train"	2:14

=== Nuka-World ===
The game also features an additional radio station tied to the 2016 downloadable content Nuka-World. It features original songs performed by the character RedEye who also hosts the radio station. Musician Andrew W.K. wrote and performed the songs in addition to voicing the character. He described working on character as, "When I pictured RedEye, I kind of imagined myself being more filthy and ravaged than ever - like I would be after not sleeping for two months and drinking nothing but radioactive cola. That's actually pretty close to how I actually felt during the voiceover recording sessions for the game. I was drinking super intense custom energy drinks and I hadn't slept in days. I think it worked great as a method for getting into character - I was totally fried and sizzling!"

The Nuka World downloadable content also features the titular theme song and jingle which plays over the theme park's loudspeaker systems on repeat. It was produced by COPILOT Music and Sound and officially released as a digital single on the iTunes digital store.

Nuka-World Theme Song (From Fallout 4: Nuka World) - Single
No.	Title	Length
1.	"Nuka-World Theme Song (From Fallout 4: Nuka World)"	1:21

=== Promotional ===
Certain songs were used in promotional material, but were not used in the game itself. During E3 2016, the promotional trailer for the downloadable content the Contraptions Workshop featured Raymond Scott's "Powerhouse" instrumental.

The promotional trailer for the virtual reality version of Fallout 4 (Fallout 4 VR) shown at E3 2017 featured "Mr. Sandman". The song would later be used in 2018's Fallout 76.

== Fallout 76 ==
Fallout 76 (Original Game Score)

Soundtrack album by Inon Zur
- Released: December 16, 2018
- Genre: Video game music
- Length: 2:52:50

The original score for Fallout 76 was composed by Inon Zur as an orchestral album. The score was officially released on the Apple Music digital store.

Portions of Fallout 76 score were also released as a vinyl record and CD. In 2018, French retailer Micromania offered a pre-order bonus 10-track LP featuring 5 songs from the Fallout 76 score and 5 songs from the Fallout 4 score. A 5-track sampler CD was also offered at various game retailers.

Two additional singles of the covers of "Take Me Home, Country Roads" and "Ring of Fire" by Spank were also officially released on Apple Music, covered more fully below.

Fallout 76 (Original Game Score)
No.	Title	Length
1.	"Main Theme"	2:40
2.	"Reclamation Day"	3:34
3.	"You Must Rebuild"	4:17
4.	"Invisible Ghosts"	4:29
5.	"Find Me There"	4:40
6.	"The Mole Miners"	2:28
7.	"Contact!"	1:18
8.	"You Can't Hide Forever"	2:25
9.	"Wandering Appalachia, Pt. I"	7:45
10.	"Burn Away the Mist"	3:37
11.	"The Wind and the Reeds"	4:20
12.	"The Savage Divide"	4:10
13.	"Blackwater"	2:12
14.	"Pest Control"	1:11
15.	"Facing Myths"	1:49
16.	"Wandering Appalachia, Pt. II"	10:18
17.	"Gather Around the C.A.M.P. Fire"	4:20
18.	"The Grafton Damned"	4:34
19.	"Out There in Appalachia"	4:03
20.	"The Power Plant"	2:32
21.	"We Are One..."	1:14
22.	"This Is Your Death"	1:43
23.	"Wandering Appalachia, Pt. III"	10:30
24.	"Lit Only by the Stars"	4:13
25.	"Moonrise"	4:27
26.	"The Excavator"	4:21
27.	"Catacombers"	2:25
28.	"We Hold the Line Here"	2:14
29.	"Wandering Appalachia, Pt. IV"	11:21
30.	"Nightfall in the Mire"	3:57
31.	"A Light Up Ahead"	4:39
32.	"Crags and Cliffs"	4:04
33.	"Landscape Lament"	4:18
34.	"Hesitation Is Discouraged"	2:20
35.	"Wandering in Appalachia, Pt. V"	9:03
36.	"Ash Heap Lullaby"	4:23
37.	"Three Minutes"	2:52
38.	"Scorched Earth"	2:13
39.	"Wandering in Appalachia, Pt. VI"	11:07
40.	"Our Way of Life Will Endure"	4:28

Another score installment was added with the early 2020 downloadable content Wastelanders. The score was officially released on the Apple Music digital store.

Fallout 76: Wastelanders (Original Game Score)

Soundtrack album by Inon Zur
- Released: April 7, 2020
- Genre: Video game music
- Length: 1:06:54

Fallout 76: Wastelanders (Original Game Score)
No.	Title	Length
1.	"Wastelanders Main Theme"	2:20
2.	"Wayward Souls"	3:42
3.	"Strength in Numbers"	4:27
4.	"Foundation"	4:25
5.	"Wandering Appalachia: Part 7"	5:27
6.	"Stay Clear of the Space Station"	4:20
7.	"Appalachia Has Changed"	4:14
8.	"What Kind of Future"	3:58
9.	"Stick Together"	4:27
10.	"The Crater"	4:26
11.	"Whisper a Story"	4:20
12.	"All That Glitters"	4:25
13.	"Wandering Appalachia: Part 8"	6:20
14.	"Follow Me"	4:15
15.	"Appalachian Retrospective"	5:48

An additional score installment was added for the late 2020 downloadable content Steel Dawn. The score was officially released on the Apple Music digital store.

Fallout 76: Steel Dawn (Original Game Score)

Soundtrack album by Inon Zur
- Released: February 4, 2021
- Genre: Video game music
- Length: 1:00:12

Fallout 76: Steel Dawn (Original Game Score)
No.	Title	Length
1.	"Steel Dawn Main Theme"	2:27
2.	"Homecoming"	3:52
3.	"Descent"	3:37
4.	"Dawn Patrol"	3:50
5.	"Into the Unknown"	4:21
6.	"Darkness into Light"	3:51
7.	"Atlas"	3:43
8.	"In Our Midst"	3:16
9.	"Wildwood"	3:52
10.	"Lying in Wait"	3:16
11.	"A New Dawn"	3:38
12.	"Valor"	3:44
13.	"Respite"	3:47
14.	"Uncertain Rest"	3:50
15.	"Mission"	3:40
16.	"Something Lurking"	2:12
17.	"M.I.A."	3:16

=== Additional licensed tracks ===
In 2018, APM Music released a statement revealing it had provided "100+ cues licensed for Fallout 76". APM Music also released an official digital album in 2018 featuring 39 tracks licensed for the game. Several tracks serve as background music for the game's item store, the Atomic Shop, with seasonal Halloween and Christmas song variants. Others play during gameplay such as on the game's jukeboxes, gramophones, and specific quests including "Jazz Potatoes" from the Wasted on Nukashine quest and "One More Pils" for a quest based on Fastnacht.

=== Original songs and covers ===
Two original covers of the songs "Ring of Fire" and "Take Me Home, Country Roads" were recorded by New York-based doo wop group Spank, produced by COPILOT Music and Sound, and arranged by Ravi Krishnaswami. "Country Roads" was introduced in the debut trailer for Fallout 76 in 2018 while "Ring of Fire" was introduced in the trailer for the 2019 downloadable content Nuclear Winter. The cover of the 1971 song "Country Roads" is the second original cover of a pre-existing modern song used in the Fallout series, the first being the cover of the 1993 song "Cobwebs and Rainbows" from Fallout: New Vegas.

In a 2019 interview, Spank group member Scout Ford noted that getting the opportunity to record the songs was a happy coincidence from performing at a child's birthday party to the parents putting them in contact with the Fallout 76 producers. Specifically, they wanted a certain musical tone and "We did it according to what the client wanted, but we were able to layer the harmonies with our own sound".

Initially used in the promotional trailers for the game, both songs were added to the in-game radio and officially released on the Apple Music digital store. In 2018, Bethesda announced all proceeds from the digital sales of "Country Roads" were being donated to Habitat for Humanity, assuring a minimum US$100,000 donation. The cover of "Take Me Home, Country Roads" also saw a physical release as a vinyl 45 record given as a promotional item with the December 2018 issue of Stack magazine from Australian retailer JB Hi-Fi.

Fallout 76 (Original Trailer Soundtrack)
No.	Title	Length
1.	"Take Me Home, Country Roads"	3:01
2.	"Ring of Fire"	3:00

=== Promotional only ===
Certain songs were used in promotional material, but were not used in the game itself. During E3 2018, a shorter variation of the "Let's Work With Others" trailer for Fallout 76 featured Ray Smith's song "Right Behind You Baby", previously used in Fallout 4, but not in Fallout 76. The promotional trailer for the early 2020 downloadable content Wastelanders featured Eddie Cochran's "C'mon Everybody". The 2020 Summer Update trailer for The Legendary Run season featured the song "The More I Get, The More I Want" by the contemporary Swedish-Danish band, The Kokomo Kings.

The trailer for the late 2020 downloadable content Steel Dawn featured the Outlaws' cover of the song "(Ghost) Riders in the Sky: A Cowboy Legend" taken from their 1980 album Ghost Riders. Fallout 76 had previously featured the 1959 Sons of the Pioneers version of the song. The 2020 Year in Review trailer featured the rockabilly song "Keep on Rollin" by Terry Devine-King.

== Fallout (TV series) ==
The soundtrack for the television series Fallout was composed by Ramin Djawadi. The soundtrack was released on April 8, 2024 through Amazon Content Services two days before the series' release.

== Other games ==
=== Fallout Tactics: Brotherhood of Steel ===
The 2001 game Fallout Tactics: Brotherhood of Steel features 20 ambient tracks composed by Inon Zur. An official download was released by GOG.com upon purchasing the game. It is the only Fallout title to not feature a licensed 1950s-inspired track.

=== Fallout: Brotherhood of Steel ===
The 2004 game Fallout: Brotherhood of Steel features a number of 1950s-inspired background tracks by Matt Gruber (credited for "Additional Ambient Music") as well as more heavy metal inspired background tracks by Devin Townsend (credited for "Ambient and Battle Music"). The main menu theme, "A Nuclear Blast", was composed by Craig Stuart Garfinkle with sung lyrics as a pastiche of a 1950s nuclear-themed novelty song. An official score album has not been released. In addition, the game features licensed tracks from modern day heavy metal bands mostly used as non-diegetic battle music.

=== Van Buren ===
Game development on the Van Buren project was cancelled in 2003 prior to release. In 2007, a short video of a tech demo created by Black Isle Studios in 2003 was hosted by No Mutants Allowed. The video features a cover of the 1931 song "Dream a Little Dream of Me" recorded by The Beautiful South in 1995. A download of the tech demo included several ambient tracks from the 2001 compilation album Funeral Songs.

=== Fallout Online ===
Fallout Online is a cancelled massively multiplayer online game. Also known as Project V13, game development on the title was cancelled by 2012. In 2010, a teaser trailer was released on the now-defunct Fallout Online website featuring a song by Ma Rainey, "Slave to the Blues" recorded in 1925.

== Critical reception and analysis ==
The soundtrack of the Fallout series has also attracted commentary and analysis in the popular press and in academic ludomusicological study particularly of the licensed music presented as diegetic music within the game world.

=== Ambient score ===
French author Rémi Lopez complimented Mark Morgan's ambient score for 1997's Fallout as a "sensory experience...one moment desolate, the next wild." The tracks varied from droning, dark ambient ("Radiation Storm", "Underground Troubles") to tribal percussion ("Moribund World", "City of Lost Angels") to contrast the choice between "the remains of a dead civilization and a return to primal brutality." However, Lopez noted that Morgan was accused of plagiarism due to similarities of his tracks with ambient musician Aphex Twin due to having been given a reference music CD containing Aphex Twin's work by video game producer Tim Cain though Cain "deliberately omitt[ed] the names of the artists".

Likewise for 1998's Fallout 2, Lopez noted that the game expanded the pre-existing soundtrack from the predecessor by adding a dozen more tracks with Morgan adding electric guitar in "My Chrysalis Highwayman" and electronic sounds in "All-Clear Signal". As an Easter egg to fans of the series, Lopez noted that Obsidian and Bethesda licensed the ambient tracks from the first two Fallout games in 2010's Fallout: New Vegas "as if in homage to Mark Morgan's previous work."

Inon Zur's orchestral score for 2008's Fallout 3 was nominated for a BAFTA Games Award for Best Original Score at the 2009 5th British Academy Games Awards as well as nominated for Best Original Score at the 2008 Spike Video Game Awards. Similarly, Inon Zur's score for 2015's Fallout 4 was nominated for a BAFTA Games Award for Best Music at the 2016 12th British Academy Games Awards as well as nominated for Best Score/Soundtrack at The Game Awards 2015.

Author William Cheng noted Inon Zur's score for 2008's Fallout 3 as an "unintrusive, sparsely textured soundtrack" garnering "much acclaim".

Fallout 76 was nominated for a Tin Pan Alley Award for Best Music in a Game at the New York Game Awards.

=== Licensed music as diegetic music ===
Ivănescu noted that while 1997's Fallout and 1998's Fallout 2 only featured "one appropriated song each", the two songs, the Ink Spots' "Maybe" and Louis Armstrong's "A Kiss to Build a Dream On" start playing before any gameplay imagery begins and are "the first introduction to the world depicted in the games." This connection of imagery and music has continued into the later rebooted entries in the Fallout series where the music and "popular culture of the past" is repurposed into postmodern works while also bringing to mind literary modernist traditions including the 1981 short story "The Gernsback Continuum" and the 1922 poem "The Waste Land". In both, the reader is invited to explore the future while documenting vignettes of the past.

In the chapter "A Tune at the End of the World" in his 2014 book, Cheng recognized that despite the critically acclaimed score by Inon Zur for 2008's Fallout 3, much of the attention of player and critics was directed towards the music from the three diegetic radio stations of the game: Enclave Radio, Galaxy News Radio, and Agatha's Station. Cheng describes the player character growing up in an underground vault throughout childhood until a sudden incident forces the player to leave and escape into the nuclear wasteland on the surface such that "the first time in your life, it seems, you're alone" He notes the dual nature of music being a warm companion or an unfeeling entity in Fallout 3. The player is notified by their "Pip-Boy" device seconds later of the availability of a new radio broadcast signal offering "noisy relief from the silence and solitude of the Capital Wasteland. Music and voices from the radio bestow a sense of imagined community by promising that somewhere, someone else is listening to the same thing." However, the "promise" turns to illusion as the player realizes every station runs on a loop featuring music from a distant past and most NPCs "never acknowledge (much less sing along to) these canned broadcasts." The charismatic chats by President Eden on Enclave Radio are merely the work of an artificial "self-aware supercomputer". Galaxy News Radio has "spirited monologues sound spontaneous and plausibly live, but since the player is able to hear Three Dog on the radio while watching him mill around the station (not performing on air), it can be inferred that his speeches are recorded." Agatha's Station features violin improvisation with the eponymous character looking "to be the only person creating new music in this artistically bankrupt world." A request for a "live performance" is "a real treat", "a rare simulation of live musicality in the game" at first. Author William Gibbons in his 2018 book wrote that Agatha's live music "embodies art's tenacity even in the most adverse of circumstances" giving proof that civilization, humanity, and hope survives in the wasteland compared to the "'dead' records we hear on other radio stations". However, repeat performances reveal herself to be an automaton where "the motions of her fingers and bow don't line up with the music" and "like any NPC, inevitably loses her magic luster, baring the gears that turn like clockwork beneath her painted skin." Gibbons concurs that her "liveness" requires a "suspension of disbelief on our part." Like the wasteland itself, the radio provides hints of life, but also emptiness.

In 2010's Fallout: New Vegas, Ivănescu comments that Mojave Music Radio and Radio New Vegas are not "as integrated in the narrative" as in Fallout 3. She notes that of the two, only Radio New Vegas features a host, Mr. New Vegas, a combination of the suave news delivery of Three Dog and the artificial intelligence of President Eden from the previous game. Mojave Music Radio has no talking DJ described by Ivănescu as "reflecting the more rural myth of the Wild West, often centered around natural, rather than man-made beauty, and the freedom of an uninhabited landscape."

Ivănescu notes that the radio stations of 2015's Fallout 4 continue to maintain the "picture of an everlasting America or at least an everlasting American Dream" of previous games in Diamond City Radio, Classical Radio, and Radio Freedom. Gibbons contrasts the classical music of Agatha's Station in 2008's Fallout 3 with Fallout 4's Classical Radio. While available at the beginning of the game (as opposed to the quest required to access Agatha's Station), Gibbons notes that further gameplay reveals is "a tool of The Institute, an 'enlightened' and scientifically advanced organization" who views most other people living in the wasteland as "savages". Here it, it both converges and diverges from the intent in Fallout 3; they are both "a 'civilizing' force", but Agatha's music is a "benevolent influence" while The Institute is a "patriarchal and arguably nefarious" influence. Ivănescu regards Radio Freedom as the most novel, playing instrumental violin songs that imply "[honesty], hope and a carefree existence" in-line with the colonial America-esque Minutemen faction that run the station. Ivănescu also compliments the use of the five original songs performed by actress Lynda Carter as the character Magnolia. The songs serve double duty in terms of intra-diegetic gameplay where the descriptive lyrics both "allude to places and events in the gameworld" and also "feature sultry, firtatious tones" as an indicator that the character can engage in a romantic relationship with the player.

Cheng explored two examples of the diegetic music affecting the gameplay experience in 2008's Fallout 3 both within the game and to the player at the game's controls, or diegesis. The first centers on a quest regarding the option of blowing up the city of Megaton with a nuclear bomb. The author noted his first repeated playthroughs of the game in 2010 and 2011 involved disarming the bomb instead, being given a modest reward by the residents of the city, and igniting the wrath of the city's antagonist. A subsequent playthrough in 2012 explored the other option meeting the city's antagonizers, characters named Mr. Burke and Alistair Tenpenny. He comments on how the physical action of the player pressing a button on a controller is directly reflected with pressing the remote detonator in the game to a point where this "mimetic link" was "almost too close for comfort." The brilliant light of the mushroom cloud, the silence of the delayed sonic reaction suddenly combined with the music of Enclave Radio playing "The Stars and Stripes Forever" where the "piece invokes the American nation in all its cultural and military pride." However standing before the "Big Red Button", Cheng noted it drew his attention to "Mr. Tenpenny's embodiment of the Enclave's radical authority and extremist ideologies." Following the utter destruction of the distant city, Enclave Radio played "America the Beautiful" which made it "made it all the more tasteless" as if "rubbing the noses of the departed in Mr. Tenpenny's triumph." Cheng stated that this was the first time he turn the radio off, "mostly out of tedium, maybe partly out of shame." Reviewing the recorded footage, Cheng remarked how he had pressed the button almost in sync with the closing of the march whether as a coincidence or "preemptively obliged to put on a show for the eventual lecture audiences". Whether theatrical or not, Cheng also notes it was the obedient thing to do where he had hesitated to press the button, but was compelled by the march as well as the gameplay. He wondered if he had been more or less likely to continue with the act if the radio was playing classical music or if it was turned off. Cheng cites other examples of "blame displacement" in historical situations in addition to quotes from other players posted in online forums about this ethical dilemma taken from a moral standpoint vs. a pragmatic standpoint even as a simulated scenario. In a footnote, Cheng gives an anecdote of presenting the Megaton gameplay at the Harvard Department of Music in 2011. After asking for volunteers from the assembled professors and graduate students to push the "Big Red Button", half the people in the room hesitantly raised their hands. The volunteer picked at random to set off the fictional bomb said she felt "strangely guilty" in front of her peers and professors "even though the people [the Megaton residents] weren't real!"

Cheng's second example featured a lighter gameplay instance. Though access to Enclave Radio and Galaxy New Radio was readily available at the beginning of the game, Cheng notes he had to complete a specific quest of retrieving and giving a violin to gain access to the private radio signal about Agatha's Station "about eight hours into the game." After exiting Agatha's house, he noted that Prelude of Bach's Violin Partita No. 2 was playing on the newly acquired radio signal as he climbed a nearby hill intending to complete other tasks in the game. However, the author stopped on the hill as the station played Bach, violin improvisations, and Dvořák as the surrounding sky grew brighter. "It eventually dawned on me that I was witnessing sunrise." Cheng realized that while listening to the radio he was "not playing the game in a conventional sense", leaving the game controls untouched for a half-hour. In contrast to the music at Megaton, Cheng remarked that the music here had served as a method of disobedience to ignore the gameplay where he had "subtly transgressed against the game itself, dismissing its call to arms one track at a time."

=== Content, control, and limited availability of music ===
Regarding the musical content of the radio stations in Fallout 3, Cheng loosely summarizes them as "the 1940s (GNR), 1890s (the Enclave's Sousa), or 1720s (Agatha's Bach). Galaxy News Radio features songs from the Great American Songbook tackling "first-world (that is, preapocalyptic) problems" written and sung by people "who could hardly have imagined what it would be like one day to live in a world truly on fire." However the prevalence of "American songs, marches, and anthems on GNR and Enclave Radio" can lead to the impression that "hyperviolence in the wasteland is somehow endemic to everyday American society" or what is now the future remnants of American society. Agatha's station is a prominent exception to the litany of American-written compositions. (Note: Other songs on Galaxy News Radio which were not written and recorded in America include those by Gerhard Trede, Billy Munn, Allan Gray, and Eddy Christiani & Frans Poptie as German, British, Polish, and Dutch nationals respectively. Cheng noted these songs were provided by APM Music and could not find research on these tracks at the time.) The classical music of Johann Sebastian Bach, Antonín Dvořák, and Pablo de Sarasate are "ghettoized (relegated to the margins of the airwaves)" and is entirely dependent on the player retrieving a Stradivarius violin to give to Agatha. Cheng notes that this private signal can only be detected on the player's Pip-Boy and not on any other available radio set. This so-called pirate underground radio station of music praised in the present-day "for its alleged universal appeal—provides a fittingly ironic reflection of the wasteland's cultural upheavals."

Cheng notes there are "conspicuous double entendres when heard in the game's postapocalyptic setting" and details lines and lyrics from "I Don't Want to Set the World on Fire", "Civilization", and "Butcher Pete" in 2008's Fallout 3. Though Ivănescu notes several songs later included in 2015's Fallout 4 ranged from "ambivalent feelings towards nuclear power" to genuine "tension, propaganda and fear associated with [the Cold War]". Songs like "Atom Bomb Baby", "Uranium Fever", and "Uranium Rock" were regarded as whimsical "novelty songs" at the time, but also are loaded with the period's "pervasive anxieties".

Regarding Galaxy News Radio, Ivănescu notes that "Civilization" functions as a commentary on "xenophobia and racism" as well as a "critique of a civilisation" as a product of the Atomic Age. Other songs like "'Way Back Home", "I'm Tickled Pink", "Happy Times", and "Let's Go Sunning" present optimism and "present America through rose tinted glasses, drawing a picture of the American Dream, the American way of life and all-American values." "A Wonderful Guy" in addition carries implications of an anti-racist message, brought through the musical vehicle of the originating 1949 play South Pacific.

In 2010's Fallout: New Vegas Ivănescu summarizes the Mojave Music Radio and Radio New Vegas stations as respectively providing the cowboys and the crooners that "invoke both freedom and violence, both unlimited possibilities and corruption and crime." Instead of visions of Middle America and white picket fences, the soundtracks of a post-apocalyptic version of Las Vegas "represent yet another facet of the American Dream: the one associated with explorers, pioneers and making your fortune." The surrounding empty wasteland is represented through the lyrics of "Stars of the Midnight Range" while the glamour of the desert city of New Vegas and its casinos is conveyed through Rat Pack veterans Frank Sinatra's "Blue Moon" and Dean Martin's "Ain't That a Kick in the Head". Along with Nat King Cole's "Love Me As Though There Were No Tomorrow", all three songs evoke love, capitalism, and sexual promiscuity from Sin City though Martin's song also echoes the violence of passion and the literal kick/gunshot in the head suffered by the player character at the beginning of the game. Ivănescu notes that four songs play across all of the main radio stations in Fallout: New Vegas: "Johnny Guitar", "It's a Sin to Tell a Lie", "Heartaches by the Number", and "Big Iron". All four "present warnings and moral judgement" singing about people who "find their comeuppance" in the country, film noir, and femme fatale genres. "Big Iron" features an explicit example of tracking down a criminal while "Why Don't You Do Right?" serves as a reflection of the player's action on the game world. "Johnny Guitar" rounds off the setlist, bridging the gap between the two worlds invoking the "glamour of a casino as much as a saloon" from its title western and Peggy Lee's sultry voice. Lopez noted that the same themes extended to the present day with more modern country and jazz songs "dated from 1990 to 2000" including "Let's Ride into the Sunset Together", "Lone Star", "Slow Sax", and "Sit and Dream". With modern musicians tackling age-old themes in a contemporary fashion, the "illusion was seamless" among the older songs on the Fallout: New Vegas soundtrack.

Cheng also notes that similar games have featured diegetic licensed music before such as the BioShock series and the Grand Theft Auto series, in Fallout 3 the player wields exceptional control "over the very existence of radio music in the wasteland." Aside from the prosaic action of merely turning the radio on and off, killing President Eden will shut off the patriotic music of Enclave Radio, failing to repair a relay dish causes Galaxy News Radio's swing music to remain weak and static-filled, and refusing to retrieve a violin for Agatha will never activate her radio signal of classical music. Ivănescu singles out Agatha's violin as serving a rare triple duty not as mere nostalgia, but also of historical significance (it is the Stradivarius once owned by Amédée Soil in 1714), as personal significance (as Agatha's possession), and as musical significance (to create living music). Ivănescu summarizes that these scant remnants of "[cultural] currency becomes literal currency" including in the form of lost music like the games' iconic, ersatz bottlecap currency to buy and sell the American Dream in its new, altered forms. The player "determines what music survives and what passes into extinction."

Setting aside the player agency regarding personal control over the airwaves' content, Cheng offers diegetic and non-diegetic explanations for the seemingly limited setlists of the radio stations in Fallout 3. Players may ask why "there's no trace of music composed (at the very least) between 1950 and 2077" and whether it flourished or failed to be preserved. For the diegetic explanations for "the wasteland's dearth of new music", Cheng says Agatha pre-records her music "because it would be too tiring for her to play live day and night" and also says of Three Dog of Galaxy News Radio that he "hasn't managed to scavenge more than a few music records in playable condition." Gibbons also says that the Fallout games "[suggest] that the atomic blasts destroyed all post-vinyl recording technology, but that tortured logic seems both unconvincing and unnecessary." Cheng segues into the non-diegetic explanations as "[excuses] like these permitted the game's creators to circumvent questions about what directions music would take in the years leading up to 2277." There is a lack of new music in the Capital Wasteland (aside from Agatha's) both because it is "unimaginable for the gameworld's traumatized inhabitants" and also unimaginable to the present player "what music hundreds of years from now will sound like". Ostensibly, the primary reason for the song selection from decades ago is "reduced licensing costs" though using songs by "more recent artists (say, Golijov or Gaga) [a modern classical music composer and a modern pop singer] would have had greater difficulty establishing the vague sense of pastness" while this "hodgepodge of pre-1950s tunes could sound sufficiently old" by modern players of the game.

In a 2019 video essay for Polygon, Brian David Gilbert criticized that the songs in Fallout were old and lacked new music, citing the songs "Anything Goes" (1930s), "I Don't Want to Set the World on Fire"/"Jingle Jangle Jingle" (1940s), and "Big Iron"/"Johnny Guitar" (1950s). He also criticized the 185 years from 2102 to 2287 in Fallout, saying only two people, Magnolia and Red Eye, were still recording new music.

As a coda to the seemingly limited selection of music, Ivănescu remarks how the aura of Elvis Presley's "semiotic ghost" survives in 2010's Fallout: New Vegas, but not his name nor his music. A former Elvis impersonation school serves as the headquarters of a gang called "The Kings". With only the word "School" remaining visible on the building's façade, the gang members suppose it as a religious institution dedicated to the worship of this unnamed figure and strive to uphold and imitate the lost traditions, albeit in an entirely misinformed manner. Ivănescu recognizes it as an overall "comment on fandom" where ghosts can linger, legacy is forgotten, and a pseudo-religion can emerge with even with few known details of its origin. The limited or non-existent nature of the music of Elvis has helped to create an alternate "ahistorical world" where "all that remains is a shadow" of the original context. Meanwhile, Lopez notes the non-diegetic explanation that "Bethesda fought hard to secure the rights to his [Elvis Presley's] music", but the licensing costs for "a single song from the King" did not outweigh the benefits of "a wide variety of tracks".

=== Co-opted or false nostalgia, repurposing, and revived interest of music ===
Andra Ivănescu, in the opening chapter of her 2019 book, clarifies the difference between using the terms pre-existing vs. borrowed vs. appropriated music in video games. Though the terms may appear interchangeable, they provide different connotations. "Pre-existing music" is imprecise and "does not suggest anything about how the music is used" aside from it having existed before. "Borrowed music" suggests an "innocuous" relationship between the old and new uses though remains unchanged and not a transformative use. "Appropriated music" is the most "charged" term evoking cultural appropriation where "dominant cultures take and use elements of minority cultures for profit and without context". However, Ivănescu recommends using the term "appropriated" over the more neutral term "borrowed" as the latter addresses transformative uses and "deliberate artistic recontextualisation". Namely "appropriated music" more readily conveys usage with "whole or with little modification", it remains "recognisable", and "recontextualised". Borrowed music can be easily returned, but appropriated music "begs for a reason, a motivation, an explanation" despite the negative connotations as well as connecting to the historical use of "deliberate artistic appropriation" and "the entire spectrum of its sociocultural significance in mind."

Cheng notes that "most players are not likely to know the exact date (or even decade) of particular pieces" or perhaps have a hazy, "obscure, daresay conflated, past—remembrance without precise referent." Ivănescu brings up that it is temping to categorize the radio stations of Fallout 3 "as simply the heroes (GNR) and the villains (Enclave Radio)", but their musical content and broadcast propaganda speaks to their "more profound similarity" regarding "paramusical echoes of racism". Three Dog of Galaxy News Radio gives speeches against "bigots" and "ghouls", humans who have been drastically mutated through radiation. Enclave Radio serves as propaganda to accomplish their goal to remove irradiated "impure" humans from the wasteland. Aside from providing access through reminiscences with friends and relatives who did live during that period of music, Cheng brings up that many of the songs are "double-edged" with most players unaware of the context or history. Galaxy News Radio may be remembered from "old-timey films, television parodies, theme parties, and grandparents' dusty records" and "cheery, sassy nonchalance", but also for the "brutal wartime climates out of which this repertoire emerged." Enclave Radio brings up the "legacies of American pomp and pride" and "American nationalism", but also the "shadows of imperialism and xenophobia." Agatha's Station and her classical music performance is associated with "antiquity...with roots reaching back centuries", but also "freighted with potential connotations of elitism, exoticism." Overall, even the transmission through the medium of radio has the potential to bring up "endless debates about consumerism, commercialism, and propaganda." Though Cheng says exactly "[how] much any player recognizes or cares about these possibilities for critique remains a different question." Ivănescu quotes from author Svetlana Boym's critique of nostalgia where as "[survivors] of the twentieth century, we are all nostalgic for a time when we were not nostalgic" where the mythical future of Fallout is constructed out of the equally mythical past. Cheng draws parallels to the player at the controls with the game's NPCs where the "tunes ostensibly evoke no more than a blurry sense of a distant past."

However, Cheng also brings up how the music has brought back a revived interest to a new generation. Players "upon completing their adventure...encounter big band tunes, American hymns, or Baroque preludes in everyday life (at concerts, on YouTube, in coffee shops) are liable to yearn for the game itself". Cheng also gives examples of quotes taken from internet forums of players turning on the radio to "beat the wasteland's lonely, perilous ambience", demonstrate "swagger and sass", or simply revel in the random chance of music pairings with the action of gameplay images with players "mashing together cheerful songs and terrible conflict" to become "subversive Kubrickian visionaries". Ivănescu compares the "cheery sounds" of "Jingle Jangle Jingle" and the player committing "unspeakable atrocities" in Fallout: New Vegas to the use of "Stuck in the Middle with You" in the torture scene from Quentin Tarantino's 1992 film Reservoir Dogs. Cheng focuses on a quote from a player's post on a forum that there is "'nothing wrong' with listening to soothing oldies while simulating gruesome actions [a long distance sniper shot]". Cheng notes that such a comment under normal circumstances would be absolutely horrific, bringing to mind the actions of Nazi doctor Josef Mengele who would whistle snippets of classical music by Mozart, Wagner, Verdi, Puccini, and Johann Strauss, "making music while selecting victims for the gas chambers". He cites Joseph Moreno regarding Mengele's actions on the question :"How could genuine musical sentiment and mass murder comfortably coexist?" Cheng notes that "[compared] to whistling Nazis and musical torture, a video game's combinations of violent simulations and cheerful music present lower stakes" as video games are "supposed to be make-believe, unfolding in virtual spaces demarcated as such." Likewise, Ivănescu notes that such kinds of juxtapositions largely occur through happenstance and random chance from the radio as opposed to deliberate intent. Cheng also raises the question how long before the "juxtapositions of upbeat music and violent scenes" would come to seem "clichéd, banal, and predictable" whether by moviegoers or by players of video games like the Fallout, BioShock and the Grand Theft Auto franchises.

In 2017, singer Dion DiMucci filed a lawsuit against video game publisher ZeniMax Media for the use of "The Wanderer" in the 2015 television commercials for Fallout 4. The lawsuit alleged the commercials "were objectionable because they featured repeated homicides in a dark, dystopian landscape, where violence is glorified as sport" as well as being "repugnant and morally indefensible". DiMucci invoked a clause that he was not given an opportunity to reject the ads and was seeking "in excess of $1 million" in damages for the association of his song with "immoral images". In a subsequent editorial by Justin Woo, he noted that the descriptions of "repeated homicides" and the character "hunting for victims to slaughter" alleged in the lawsuit did not appear to match the official trailer which shows no images of murder or manslaughter against human beings. He notes there are other unofficial, but popular videos "[using] footage from original Zenimax / Bethesda-created commercials. It has a body count so high that I'm not even going to bother enumerating it" and hypothesizes "that someone, either DiMucci or a person acting on his behalf, went to Google up 'Wanderer' and 'Fallout' and found Valenzuela's video, thinking it was an official release from Zenimax". Arbitration was compelled in 2018 in Dion DiMucci v. ZeniMax Media Inc.

== Bibliography ==
- Cheng, William (2014). "A Tune at the End of the World". Sound Play: Video Games and the Musical Imagination (1st ed.). Madison Avenue, New York, NY: Oxford University Press. pp. 19–56. ISBN 978-0-19-996996-8.
- Gibbons, William James (2018). Unlimited Replays: Video Games and Classical Music. Oxford Music/Media Series (1st ed.). Madison Avenue, New York, NY: Oxford University Press. ISBN 9780190265267.
- Ivănescu, Andra (2019). Popular Music in the Nostalgia Video Game: The Way It Never Sounded. Palgrave Studies in Audio-Visual Culture (1st ed.). Gewerbestrasse, Cham, Switzerland: Springer Nature. ISBN 978-3-030-04280-6.
- Lafleuriel, Erwan; Lopez, Rémi; Fargo, Brian (2018). "Chapitre 6 - La musique dans Fallout" [Chapter 6 - Music in Fallout]. La saga Fallout. Histoire d'une mutation [Fallout. A Tale of Mutation] (in French). Translated by Harrison, Paul (1st ed.). rue d'Alsace-Lorraine, Toulouse, France: Third Éditions. pp. 133–141. ISBN 978-2-37784-032-8.
