= Vault 101 =

Video game location

- Fallout location
- The vault door of Vault 101 as it appears in Fallout 3
- First appearance: Fallout 3 (2008)
- Genre: Action role-playing game

In-universe information
- Location: Virginia, United States (Fallout)
- Characters: Lone Wanderer (formerly), James (formerly), Overseer, Amata, Butch

Vault 101 is a fictional underground fallout shelter in the 2008 action role-playing game Fallout 3, created as part of the Fallout franchise by Bethesda Game Studios. Located in Virginia, it serves primarily as the tutorial area for the player character, known as the "Lone Wanderer." Set in an alternate timeline of the United States, it was among many vaults that were created for human shelter from nuclear fallout by the Vault-Tec Corporation, but were also used to experiment on their unwitting residents. Vault 101 in particular was meant to keep its residents permanently isolated within. Since the "Great War of 2077" that caused the United States to be obliterated by nuclear attacks, Vault 101 had remained mostly shut from the outside world, since then a radiated wasteland, for the next 200 years.

In the game's lore, James was a scientist collaborating on a water purity project for the residents of Washington, D.C. who took a hiatus shortly after his wife died from giving birth to the player character, arranging a deal with Vault 101's overseer to allow them to stay there. The game, through the protagonist's coming of age, introduces the player through in-universe tutorial sequences that allow them to allocate in-game abilities and teach them about gameplay mechanics. In 2277, after Amata, the overseer's daughter and the Lone Wanderer's best friend, informs them of the player character's father's departure from the vault and warns them of the overseer's escalatory lockdown responses, the player character makes an escape to the wasteland for safety and to find their father, who left to restart the water purity project. Near the end of the game, the Lone Wanderer can choose to return to the vault one more time after Amata contacts them using an emergency signal via their Pip-Boy to resolve issues regarding the overseer resisting against residents' efforts to leave it.

Vault 101 has received positive receptions as an effective beginning location, in which the player is introduced to the game's mechanics through immersive tutorials. Reviewers have noted the contrast between the initially safe Vault 101 and the hostile Capital Wasteland, in which the player's exit from the vault to the outer world has been deemed as a highly memorable video game moment. Additionally, writers have tied Vault 101 into the greater theme of the illusion of safety from technology, in which dangers like the population crisis and excessive security challenge the stability of the fallout shelter.

== Appearance ==
Fallout 3 concept art of the interiors of Vault 101 by Adam Adamowicz. The tutorial's setting stands in distinct contrast to the harsh wasteland environments that the player will arrive at by leaving the vault.

Vault 101, located in Virginia, is a vault produced by the Vault-Tec Corporation that appears in the 2008 action role-playing game Fallout 3, developed by Bethesda Game Studios as part of the Fallout franchise. Fallout 3, as with the Fallout game series' other entries, depicts an alternate history in which the United States is obliterated by a nuclear war in 2077 after major global crises, leaving few survivors. A majority of the survivors were protected by the impacts of the nuclear warfare by vaults that were built by Vault-Tec, among them Vault 101 near Washington, D.C. The United States' capital itself (referred to as the "Capital Wasteland") had been in complete ruins for hundreds of years since the "Great War of 2077," being filled with radiation, toxicity, and hostile enemies. Since the Great War up until the game's events, Vault 101 and its residents were largely kept shut from the outside world, Vault-Tec originally intended it to be an experiment in which its people were to be forever closed off from the world.

In Fallout 3, a couple named James and Catherine were scientists of the Capital Wasteland affiliated with the Brotherhood of Steel in creating a water purification project for the Capital Wasteland called "Project Purity," meant to provide radiation-free water for the area's residents. In 2258, Catherine gave birth to a child canonically referred to as the "Lone Wanderer" (the player character) but died shortly after. This caused James to abandon Project Purity and take his child with him to live in Vault 101, striking a deal with the overseer to become the vault's resident doctor. Since then, the Lone Wanderer had experienced their entire life within Vault 101 up until their young adulthood. The game utilizes the coming of age sequence of the game's beginning to teach the player about gameplay and promote their upcoming importance to the plot. For instance, an early sequence features the toddler-aged player character escaping from their playpen to read a baby book called, "You're Special," allowing them to allocate their "S.P.E.C.I.A.L." (Strength, Perception, Endurance, Charisma, Intelligence, Agility, Luck) gameplay stats to allow for specialized abilities.

Fallout 3's introduction in Vault 101 serves as a tutorial in which the player character learns about the gameplay mechanics during their time there. The game fast forwards to two additional sequences in the Lone Wanderer's life. The first is during a party for the player character's 10th birthday; they are gifted a Pip-Boy, worn on the arm to serve as a radio and Geiger counter, and a BB gun to learn how to shoot. The second is when the Lone Wanderer is age 16, in which they take the Generalized Occupational Aptitude Test (G.O.A.T.), an aptitude test to cultivate the player's in-game abilities. The Lone Wanderer interacts with the vault's residents through dialogue including Amata, the overseer's daughter and best friend of the player character, and Butch DeLoria, a childhood bully later turned gang leader. The game also introduces the player to the "karma" system, which is based on how moral the player character's interactions towards other characters are, including the vault residents.

In 2277, the Lone Wanderer, now at age 19, is woken up by Amata, who informs them that their father had left the vault, causing the overseer to perform a lockdown so that nobody else could be able to escape from the vault. After Amata warns them to escape the vault, the player character has to confront chaotic events in which the vault's rooms are largely devoid of everyone but giant bugs called radroaches and hostile security guards under the overseer's orders to detain them. After escaping Vault 101 into the Capital Wasteland, the Lone Wanderer searches for their father as part of the game's main quests, learning about his prior involvements in the water purity project that he later intended to return to by leaving the vault and returning to the Capital Wasteland.

As the player character nears completion of the main quests, they are alerted through an emergency broadcast frequency on their Pip-Boy by Amata, who informs them about an emergency situation in Vault 101 and begs for them to return and resolve the issue. She explains that some of the vault's residents wanted to leave but were prevented from doing so by the current overseer. Upon returning to the vault, the Lone Wanderer finds that the guards have made strict lockdowns while a rebel faction sought to defend themselves from the overseer's men. The player character can resolve the quest through either sealing Vault 101, opening it for others to eventually leave, or making the location uninhabitable, although none of the options allow for returning to the vault again. Afterward, several characters may leave the vault, among them Butch DeLoria, who can be recruited as a companion under certain conditions. If the player chose to make the vault inhabitable by destroying the reactors, Amata will leave as well. The Lone Wanderer can then later encounter her being interrogated on the vault's whereabouts by members of the Enclave; they can choose to save her from execution, although she will still place blame on them.

== Reception ==
As the tutorial level for Fallout 3, Vault 101 has been well received by critics, with Ash Parrish from The Verge recalling how she was surprised about how much she enjoyed the introductory sequence, including with talking to other vault residents and "hitting on" Amata. PC Gamer writer Christopher Livingston stated that it was difficult for players not to have fond memories of Vault 101 like he did, as experiencing the protagonist's coming of age there up until their escape made it "one of the most memorable Vaults in the series". Roberto Barragán of MeriStation considered the event in which the Lone Wanderer escaped the vault and expose their sight to the outside world for the first time to be one of the most memorable video game moments. Comicbook.com's Charlie Ridgely highlighted the parallels between the Lone Wanderer's main quest with the plot of the more recent Fallout TV series' Lucy MacLean, one of the main characters who leaves the Vault 33 in search of her father after he is kidnapped by raiders and taken into the wasteland. He felt that the parallels between the two Fallout entries were a great way to connect with fans who began their interest in the franchise through Fallout 3.

Jordan Forward, writing for PCGamesN, argued that in his many times of replaying Fallout 3, leaving the "comfort and safety of Vault 101" for the terrifying wasteland was never any easier a moment for him. He compared Vault 101 to living in a "dream state" of "normal life in post-war America" before eventually having to confront the dystopian outside world, making it an effective tool for the game to lull the player into a sense of security before pulling the rug underneath them. He also wrote about the bittersweet experience in eventually returning to Vault 101 but never again being able to go back again afterward. Issy van der Velde of TheGamer recalled how intimate and personal the introduction in Vault 101 was and noting how the player character's moments in life occurring in different sections of the vault made it feel larger than it actually was from its narrow halls and low ceilings. He said that the moment in which a blinding light hits the player character's eyes after their entry into the wider wasteland was realistic and narratively pivotal because it is a nod to how people who lived in an underground shelter their entire life would have reacted to sunlight in the outside world for the first time. In comparison, he felt that The Elder Scrolls V: Skyrim and Fallout 4, both produced by Bethesda Game Studios, failed to achieve the memorable effectiveness for the introduction that Fallout 3 did. Another TheGamer writer, Jade King, wrote that the game "understands the importance of setting up stakes and setting up world building" starting by the unforgettable events of Vault 101. She remembered feeling guilty in having to kill people ingame that the Lone Wanderer had once known but also recalled how she could still be friendly with others before the player character leaves the vault. King said that the player is confronted with a "pervading feeling of grief looming" over them and a sense of fear and regret over leaving the vault unprepared but still feels the need to trek on to Washington, D.C.

Drew Toal of The A.V. Club discussed Vault 101 as an area in which its citizens "essentially traded their freedom for security, hunkering down in a facility designed to keep them safe and sustainable for nearly a thousand years". He suggested that the residents are more like cellmates under the control of a governing elite who do not take kindly to those asking uncomfortable questions. The author suggested that the nearby settlement of Megaton was a different vision of society from Vault 101 and "the ideal post-apocalyptic neighborhood" in comparison. In the journal Foundation: The International Review of Science Fiction, David Chandler highlighted the incorporation of the bildungsroman genre into the gameplay design of the Vault 101 sequences by representing the Lone Wanderer's aging through tutorial stages. He noted that the game allows the player to skip the G.O.A.T. test; he referred to the skip process as both woven organically in-universe and an effective meta-joke about the tediousness behind character-building in RPG games. However, he criticized the game for allowing the player to change their appearance one more time before leaving the vault, which he saw as offering to erase the in-universe narrative progress that the player makes and showing that cohesive narrative was not the game's primary objective. Derrick Rowan, for another journal Reconstruction: Studies in Contemporary Culture, explained the role of Vault 101's role in the player character's safety and its later danger to them as ties into the greater theme of technology as an illusion of safety. He argued that the player's perception of vaults as safe havens is challenged as they are exposed to additional vaults revealing that they are not for long viable alternates to living in the wasteland. He also highlighted several instances of flaws challenging Vault 101 and other Vault-Tec vaults as viable sources of quality living, such as them failing to achieve repopulation and rebuilding of the outside world, the declining population crisis as referenced by one of Vault 101's residents noting fewer children, and the excessive surveillance of the vault dwellers.
