= Pip-Boy =

Fictional wearable computer in the post-apocalyptic Fallout video game franchise

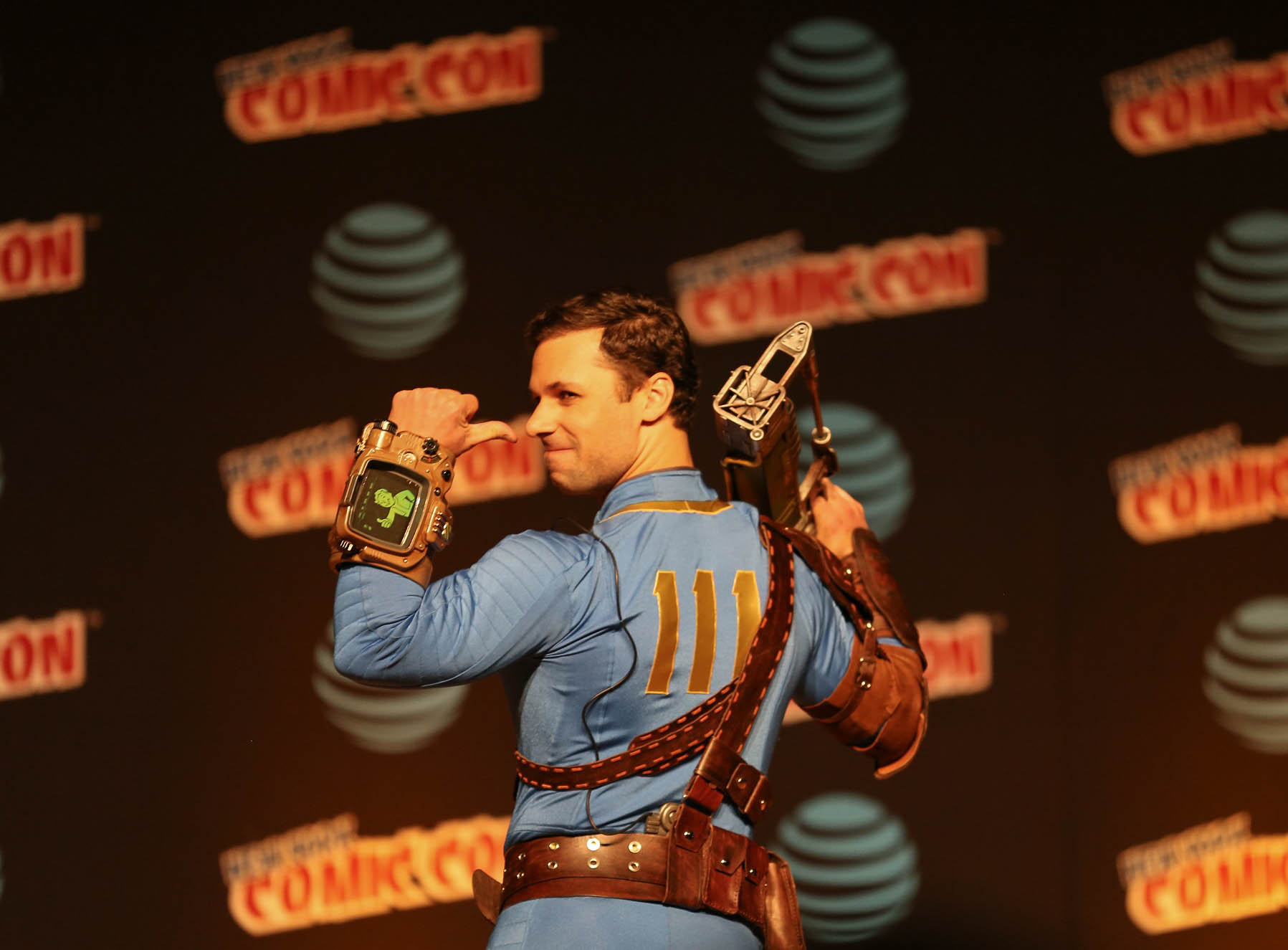
- A Sole Survivor cosplayer wearing a replica Pip-Boy (left wrist)
- Publisher: Interplay Entertainment, Bethesda Softworks
- First appearance: Fallout (1997)
- Created by: Leonard Boyarsky
- Genre: Science fiction

In-universe information
- Type: Wearable computer

The Pip-Boy is a fictional wearable computer in the post-apocalyptic Fallout video game franchise. Manufactured by RobCo Industries prior to the apocalyptic nuclear Great War, it is capable of numerous functions, depending on the model. In the Fallout games, it functions as a diegetic way for the player to access the menu and manage their inventory, as well as equip certain items when necessary.

The Pip-Boy has been named one of the most iconic tools of Fallout and video games as a whole, and is praised for its design, as well as being compared with real wearable computers. In 2015, Bethesda released a replica Pip-Boy as part of a limited run of collector's editions of Fallout 4. This replica could house a smartphone, allowing the player to control their in-game device through a phone application. A Pip-Boy 2000 Mark VI replica D.I.Y kit was sold to commemorate the release of Fallout 76. In 2024, The Wand Company released a replica of the Pip-Boy 3000 Mark V, shown in the Fallout TV series.

== Characteristics ==
In the Interplay Fallout titles, the Pip-Boy serves as a stand-in for a menu screen. In the Bethesda titles, it is attached to the player character's arm and is looked at from a first-person perspective. The newer Pip-Boy models contains a map, quest tracker, a radio and a light-up screen function, serving as a sort of flashlight.

== Development ==
Leonard Boyarsky, one of the lead designers of Fallout at Interplay, stated that he designed the Pip-Boy more towards his personal preference for "old, clunky technology" than any trend towards retrofuturism. The design was meant to seem like it "wasn't all that dependable" and "kind of hacked together" to show that "the world wasn't quite working". The user interface was meant to feel like an in-universe object, which was rare at the time. Anthony Postma, another Interplay designer, created the device's layout.

When Bethesda Softworks acquired the franchise, they increased its retrofuturistic themes. The redesigned Pip-Boy 3000 reflected the Streamline Moderne aesthetic, and looked sleeker and more polished, while still being relatively bulky. The new Pip-Boy also lacked the drawn mascot and exposed vacuum tubes of the original, in order to make it fit on the player's arm. These elements, however, make a return with Fallout 76's Pip-Boy 2000 Mark VI.

== Reception ==
The Pip-Boy is a defining symbol of the Fallout series. Khee Hoon Chan of USgamer called the Pip-Boy "one of the most iconic tools in video game history", also stating that "the gadget's transformation is [...] emblematic of the series' divergence."

Much of the notoriety of the Pip-Boy has stemmed from its design, which has reflected the rise of later real-world wearable technology, and has also directly inspired the creation of functioning devices, both by fans and engineers. In 2010, Sean Hollister of Engadget compared the General Dynamics Itronix GD300 wrist-mounted GPS unit with the design of the Pip-Boy, saying, "no word on whether it will pick up post-apocalyptic radio stations as your mission unfolds". Similarly, the prototype wrist-mounted OLED screens developed by L-3 Display Systems for use in the United States Army were compared to Pip-Boys by Mike Fahey of Kotaku, who called them "just another fine example of PIPBoy technology in real life".

Fans have created numerous working replicas, utilizing technology such as Raspberry Pi. In 2014, a team of coders created a working replica for NASA's SpaceWearables: Fashion Designer to Astronauts' challenge. Replicas were also built for commercial sale, with ThinkGeek designing a "Deluxe Bluetooth Edition".

At Bethesda's first E3 media briefing in 2015, Todd Howard stated that Bethesda would be releasing a deluxe version of Fallout 4 containing a Pip-Boy, stating, "The Pip-Boy is an important part of Fallout and we love it so much we made a real one." However, this led to criticism when it was revealed that the Pip-Boy was a non-functional plastic enclosure for a smartphone, which would operate as the Pip-Boy's display. Timothy J. Seppala of Engadget called it a "glorified smartphone case", and said that while it was comfortable to wear, the Pip-Boy app functioned better on a larger screen, stating that while "cosplayers (and eBay resellers) will likely eat this up [...] once the novelty of the Pip-Boy wears off, the rest of us won't use it much." The limited availability of the Pip-Boy Edition was also criticized, as the replicas sold out almost as soon as they were put on sale, angering fans and quickly being listed on eBay by scalpers. However, as a replacement, some fans created 3D-printable Pip-Boys with space for a custom computer inside and a working tape deck. The fact that it did not work with larger phones was cited as an additional hurdle in getting the replica to function properly.
