= Adam Adamowicz =

American concept artist (1968–2012)

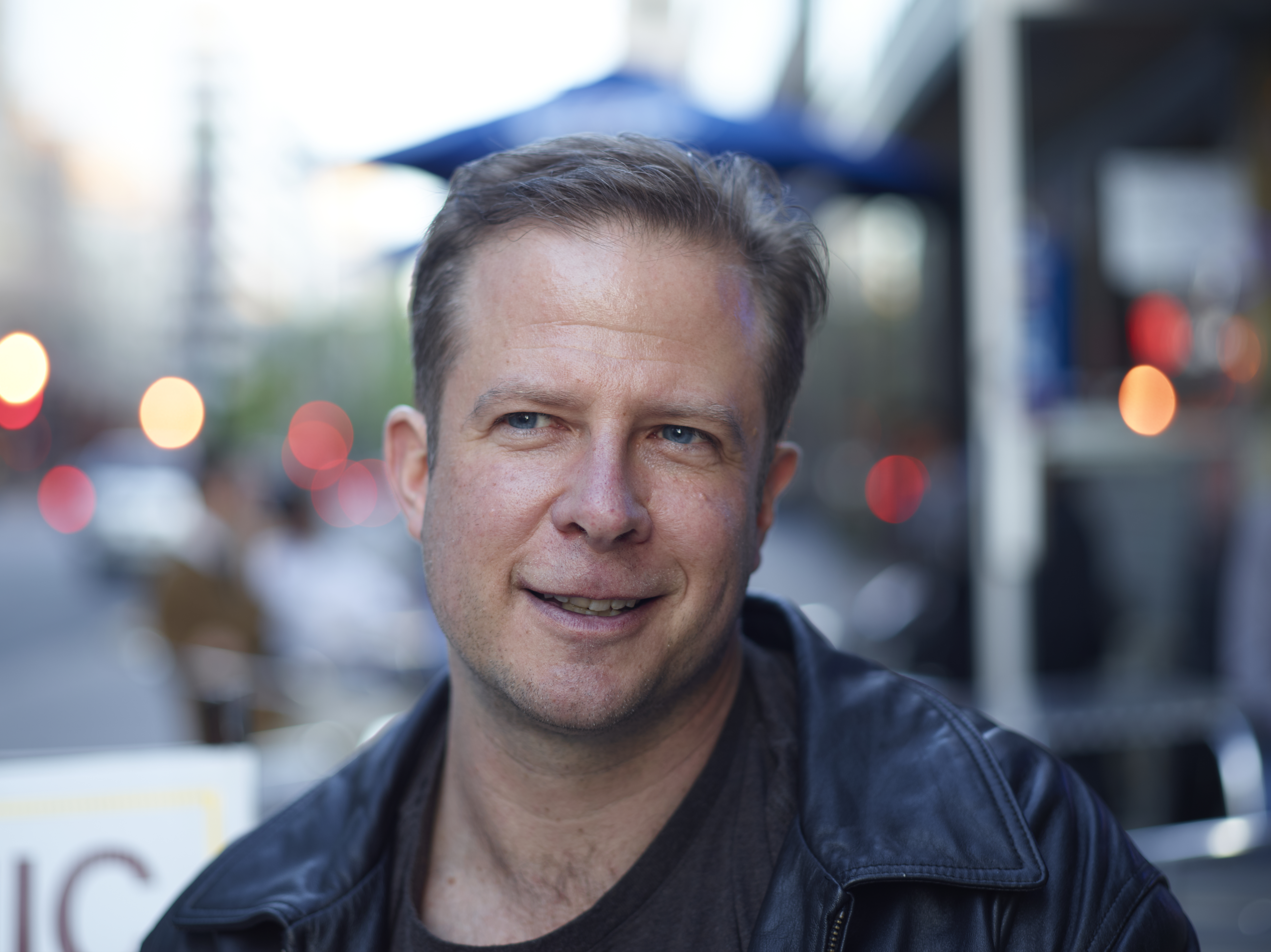
- Adamowicz in 2011
- Born: March 9, 1968; Saugerties, New York, U.S.
- Died: February 9, 2012 (aged 43); Washington, D.C., U.S.
- Occupation: Concept artist

Adam Adamowicz (March 9, 1968 – February 9, 2012) was an American video game concept artist, best known for his work on The Elder Scrolls IV: Oblivion, Fallout 3, and The Elder Scrolls V: Skyrim at Bethesda Softworks. He grew up on Long Island, New York and was of Polish descent.

Before entering the games industry Adamowicz undertook freelance work for Dark Horse Comics' New Recruits anthology and also worked on Fantagraphics Books' Duplex Planet. He produced cover illustrations for Malibu Graphics. He worked with Jaleco Entertainment, Inc. between 2002–2003. Adam started working at Bethesda Softworks in 2005. Adamowicz was the only concept artist to work on Fallout 3 and one of two, alongside Ray Lederer, for The Elder Scrolls V: Skyrim at Bethesda Softworks. His concept art and imagery were used in Fallout 4's development.

Adamowicz died from complications of lung cancer on February 9, 2012, at the age of 43.

== Credited works ==
- Nightcaster: Defeat the Darkness (2001), Microsoft Corporation
- NightCaster II: Equinox (2002), Jaleco
- Goblin Commander: Unleash the Horde (2003), Jaleco

=== Bethesda Softworks ===
- The Elder Scrolls IV: Oblivion (2006), Bethesda Softworks
- Fallout 3 (2008), Bethesda Softworks
- The Elder Scrolls V: Skyrim (2011), Bethesda Softworks
- Fallout 4 (2015), Bethesda Softworks

== See also ==
- Michael Kirkbride
