= Ghoul (Fallout) =

Fictional species in the Fallout franchise

- Fallout race
- Render of a typical Feral Ghoul used in Fallout 3 and Fallout: New Vegas
- First appearance: Fallout (1997)
- Other name: "Zombie" (derogatory)

Ghouls are a fictional race of posthuman beings from the post-apocalyptic Fallout video game franchise. Within series lore, ghouls are originally humans, many of them survivors of a global nuclear holocaust, who have been severely mutated by the residual radiation, which greatly extends their lifespans but deforms their physical appearance into a zombie-like presentation. Many ghouls live alongside humans in settlements across the post-apocalyptic wasteland, while others mentally degenerate into a violently feral and antisocial state.

Considered to be among the most recognizable and iconic elements of the Fallout intellectual property (IP), ghouls have appeared in every media of the franchise, and have been the subject of numerous fan mods of Fallout series games. Critics have lauded their use as either antagonistic figures or as supporting non-player characters throughout the series, with some even calling for ghouls to play a more central role in future sequels or adaptations of the franchise. In the 2024 American post-apocalyptic dramatic television series Fallout, pre-war actor turned ghoulified bounty hunter Cooper Howard, known simply as the Ghoul, is portrayed by Walton Goggins.

== Characteristics ==
The term "ghoul" in the Fallout series refers to human victims who were subject to prolonged exposure to radiation, Forced Evolutionary Virus (FEV) and other pollutants when they were caught outside during the Great War, a global conflict driven by the use of nuclear weapons which devastated much of the known world in the Fallout universe and provides the basis for the devastated world setting of the franchise.

Those who survive experience genetic mutations caused by elevated levels of radiation and develop widespread necrosis or rot on their physical bodies. This disrupts the normal process of decay in the neurotransmitters down a subject's spinal cord, allowing the body to continuously regenerate and function near-indefinitely unless destroyed by some outside force. However, the brain of a ghoul is not affected by this regenerative process, meaning that over decades (or even centuries) of wandering the Wasteland, a ghoul's brain will begin to degrade. It starts with the gradual loss of higher brain function, followed by increased appetite and aggression. The ghoul will finally be considered feral when it loses the last of its capacity for intelligent thought, and this is a fate that's likely to befall all ghouls as they continue to age indefinitely, all while their brain continues to deteriorate. Ghouls' lifespans are greatly extended, which allows them to live for at least hundreds of years, if not being effectively immortal. Besides their prolonged lifespans, ghouls are no longer harmed by low-level radiation and even receive physical benefits when exposed to it.

Ghouls are sterile and incapable of procreation due to the irreversible damage caused by radiation to their reproductive systems. "Born ghouls" are mentioned in older Fallout lore, but these are not present in the officially released games and are considered non-canon. In the mobile game Fallout Shelter, ghouls can have children, but these children are born as normal humans, not ghouls.

Some ghouls, colloquially known as "Glowing Ones", have managed to develop bioluminescence, rendering their bodies capable of illuminating dark areas with a glowing green light, though they also emit large amounts of radiation, which can heal other ghouls and is dangerous to non-ghouls. A new type of ghoul introduced in Fallout 76 are the Scorched, mutants infected with a virulent plague spread by large mutated bats known as Scorchbeasts; like Feral Ghouls, they are largely hostile to player characters but differ in their capability of operating firearms.

Despite their robust physiology and resilience towards radiation damage, ghouls are not as physically formidable as other types of mutated beings in the series, such as Deathclaws and Super Mutants.

=== Feral Ghouls ===
Ghouls who live within the rebuilt civilizations of the known world are similar to normal humans in terms of intellect or personality, but often suffer from discrimination due to their disconcerting physical appearance. On the other hand, Feral Ghouls have lost their mental faculties due to radiation damage and will attack other non-ghouls on sight. Feral Ghouls often roam together in packs and shamble around areas they are familiar with, such as a supermarket or a drive-in movie theatre, often with a form of muscle memory that vaguely drives them to relive aspects of the life they once knew. Trinkets looted from their corpses often provide hints or glimpses into their forgotten identities.

== Development ==
Ghouls were originally conceived as "Bloodmen" during the development cycle of the original 1997 Fallout video game. Media such as the film Forbidden Planet directed by Fred M. Wilcox and the novel I Am Legend by Richard Matheson, along with real-life accounts of radiation poisoning, were cited as inspirations behind the concept of mutated creatures such as ghouls and their exposed flesh for the early Fallout games developed by Interplay Entertainment. Character model designs were physically sculpted before they were scanned into the game. To produce the grotesque-looking skin textures of Feral Ghouls in Fallout 3, the first game in the series to be created by Bethesda Game Studios following its acquisition of the Fallout IP, artist Jonah Lobe reshaped photos of packaged chicken meat using modelling tools and filters to simulate a resemblance to human muscle tissue and create an "icky translucent" look for the relevant character models. The visual design for ghoul characters in Fallout 4 is somewhat different, though they also have a pronounced lack of nose, lips, and skin; the texture of their faces was described by Kate Gray from Kotaku as resembling melted Peeps in appearance.

Obsidian Entertainment, the developer of Fallout: New Vegas, initially considered allowing players the opportunity to play as a ghoul or a Super Mutant for their protagonist in the game. The team faced technical limitations as Fallout: New Vegas shared the same engine as Fallout 3, and the developers realized that the game engine's equipment system would not work properly for player characters that use non-human character models. The officially licensed Fallout tabletop roleplaying game, developed by Modiphius and released in April 2021, allows players to assume the role of a ghoul character; Modiphius publishing lead Chris Birch said the inclusion of ghouls as a playable race among others was part of their design decision to make the game "authentically Fallout". As Fallout 4 takes place more than 200 years after the Great War, the game's developers explored the concept behind the longevity of ghouls through a place called the Memory Den located in the settlement of Goodneighbor, where those who survived the nuclear fallout and have retained their sanity could access and revisit their pre-war memories.

== Appearances ==
Ghouls have appeared in every Fallout media, both as non-player characters in civilized settlements, and as hostile antagonists found throughout ruined or disused localities in the Fallout series. Players could also recruit ghouls as traveling companions or allies in several main series and spinoff video games: noteworthy examples include Dillon from Fallout Tactics, Raul Tejada from Fallout: New Vegas, and John Hancock from Fallout 4. Hancock in particular is available as a romance option if the player character builds a positive affinity with him through eliciting his approval of their actions. Before the Wastelanders update for Fallout 76, the Scorched was the only humanoid enemy faction that players would encounter in the game, replacing the series' standard human raiders.

In the 2024 American post-apocalyptic drama television series Fallout, former Western actor and Vault-Tec ambassador Cooper Howard, portrayed by Walton Goggins, is introduced as one of the oldest ghouls still alive.

== Cultural influence ==
=== Promotion and merchandise ===
Feral Ghouls are featured as part of a range of Fallout-themed Funko Pop figurines, which were first released in 2015.

=== Critical reception ===
Commentators have recognized ghouls, in particular the feral enemy variant, as an iconic and recognizable element of the Fallout media franchise. Tom Baines from PCGamesN remarked that Fallout 4 is a "surprisingly good zombie game" due to its effective use of common zombie mechanics and tropes through player interactions with Feral Ghouls and the game world's post-apocalyptic setting, even though they are not technically zombies in the traditional sense. Lydia McInnes from The Daily Tar Heel concurred that Feral Ghouls have been used very effectively in Fallout 4 as a horror trope and that as enemies they "are scarier than they have any right to be". In a retrospective analysis of the history of the Fallout series' horror elements, Luiz H. C. noted that while ghouls were an integral part of the original games' well-executed blend of body horror and scary atmosphere, the more graphically detailed ghoul character models in recent entries have been used admirably to instill a creepy atmosphere.

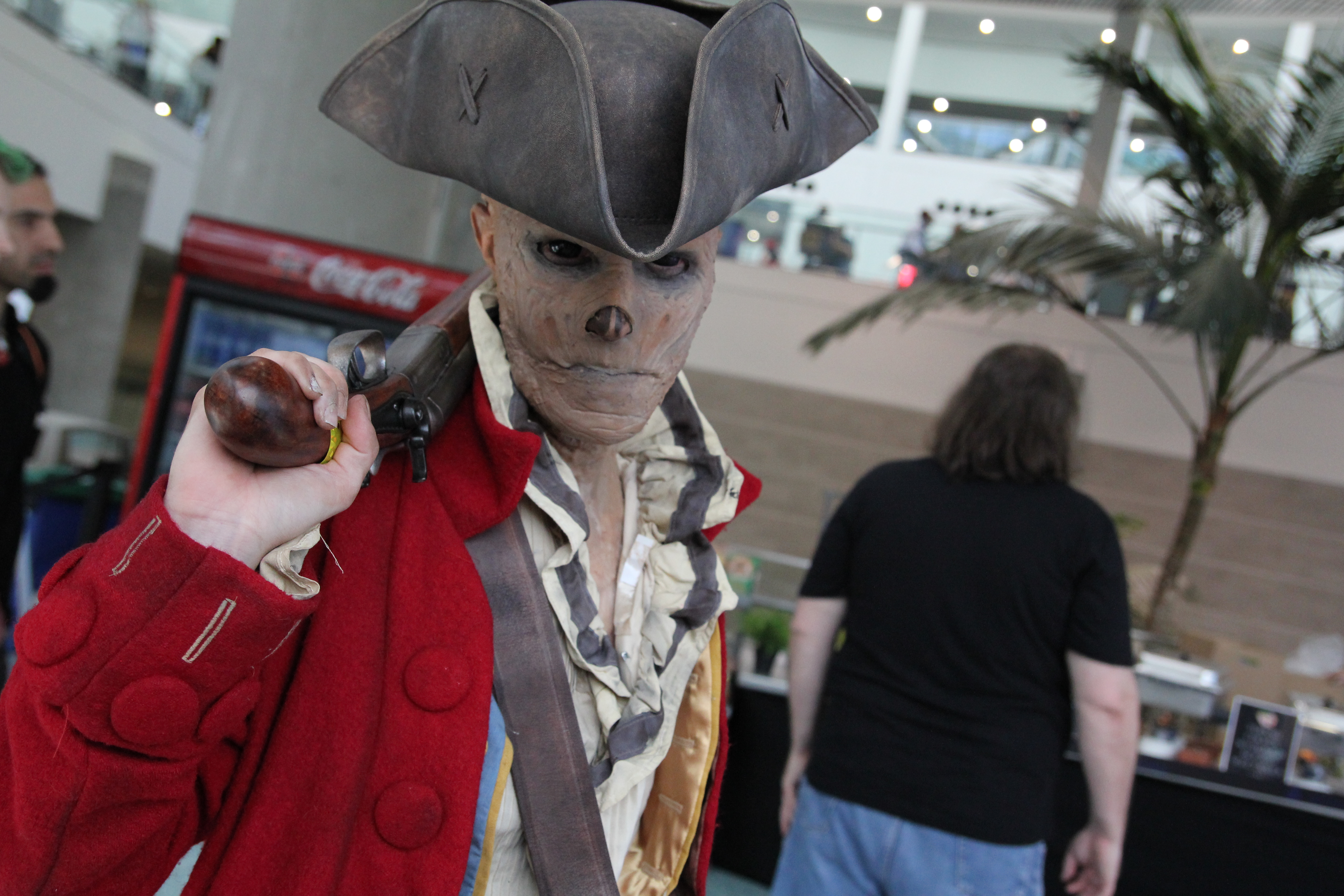
A cosplayer portraying John Hancock from Fallout 4

Individual ghoul characters have received particular acclaim for the way their physiology and psychology are presented within their respective story arcs. PCGamesN staff ranked Dillon and Raul Tejada among their list of best companion characters throughout the entire Fallout series: the former was noted for his useful gameplay utility as well as the moral dilemmas presented to the player due to his presence in their squad, whereas the latter was well received due to the exemplary performance of his voice actor Danny Trejo, which they believed lent pathos to the character's tragic backstory. Kate Gray considered John Hancock to be a compelling and interesting character, with praise for his nuanced characterization as an anti-hero, romantic dialogue, and lack of judgmental attitude or behavior towards the player's actions. Samuel Horti praised the writing behind the Fallout: New Vegas side quest "Come Fly With Me" and its use of an eccentric cast of ghoul characters, including the charismatic Glowing One Jason Bright, as the game's best and most memorable.

The notion of ghouls as playable characters in the Fallout franchise has been of some interest. In his review of the Fallout tabletop RPG, Charlie Hall from Polygon praised the option of playing one to be "inviting". Jordan Forward from PCGamesN is fascinated by the idea of playing a ghoul archetype for the next mainline installment of the Fallout video game series, and deliberated the associated mechanics and limitations surrounding such a character at length.

=== Fandom ===
Ghoul characters are popular among Fallout fans as the focus for expressions of fan labor, such as cosplay activities, playable mods, and other media.
