= Pillars of Eternity II: Deadfire =

2018 video game

- Developer: Obsidian Entertainment
- Publisher: Versus Evil
- Director: Josh Sawyer
- Producer: Adam Brennecke
- Designer: Bobby Null
- Programmer: Adam Brennecke
- Artist: Kaz Aruga
- Writers: Carrie Patel; Josh Sawyer
- Composer: Justin E. Bell
- Engine: Unity
- Platforms: Windows; Linux; macOS; PlayStation 4; Xbox One
- Release: Windows, Linux, macOS; May 8, 2018; PlayStation 4, Xbox One; January 28, 2020
- Genre: Role-playing
- Mode: Single-player

Pillars of Eternity II: Deadfire is a 2018 role-playing video game developed by Obsidian Entertainment and published by Versus Evil. It is the sequel to 2015's Pillars of Eternity, and was released for Windows, Linux, macOS in May 2018, and for PlayStation 4 and Xbox One in January 2020. A version for the Nintendo Switch was originally announced in 2018, but has been ultimately cancelled in February 2022 after multiple delays. The game was announced in January 2017 with a crowdfunding campaign on Fig, where it reached its funding goal within a day.

== Gameplay ==
Sailing scene

Pillars of Eternity II: Deadfire is a role-playing video game that is played from an isometric perspective. Both returning and new companions are available, depending upon the choices made by the player, which play an optional story role within the game. Deadfire focuses on seafaring and island exploration via a ship. Crews can also be hired to look over them and assist in ship combat. Class based gameplay returns, with each class having at least four optional sub-classes with unique skills. A new feature in Deadfire compared to the original are sub-classes.

== Plot ==
Deadfire is a direct sequel to Pillars of Eternity, taking place in the world of Eora. As with the first game, the player assumes the role of a "Watcher", a character with the ability to look into other people's souls and read their memories, as well as the ones of their past lives.

The story begins five years after the events of the first game. Eothas, the god of light and rebirth who was believed dead, awakens under the player's stronghold Caed Nua from the first game. Eothas' awakening is extremely violent, and he destroys Caed Nua, while he drains the souls of the people in the surrounding area. The Watcher similarly has a piece of his soul torn out during the attack, but manages to barely cling to life. In this near-dead state, the Watcher is contacted by Berath, the god of death, who offers to restore his soul in exchange for agreeing to become Berath's herald and take on the task of pursuing Eothas to discover what he is planning. The hunt for Eothas takes the Watcher (and his crew) via ship to the Deadfire Archipelago, where they must try to seek out answers—answers which could throw mortals and the gods themselves into chaos. The player's actions and decisions in the first game influence certain storyline elements of Deadfire.

Throughout the story, the Watcher meets four different factions all vying for control over the Deadfire area; they can help or hinder these factions along the way. Through their pursuit of Eothas, the Watcher eventually discovers the god's true intentions: he aims to break the Wheel, the cycle of reincarnation that governs the souls of Eora and by extension feeds the gods with the energy they need to sustain themselves, hoping that in doing so he can break the other gods' control over all mortal beings, allowing them to be free to pursue their own destinies. To that end, he seeks the mythical lost city of Ukaizo, where the mechanism controlling the Wheel is housed. Though the other gods intervene several times in an attempt to stop Eothas, he is undeterred and continues towards his goal.

By either swearing fealty to one of the factions and gaining their help or acting independently, the Watcher and his ship braves the stormy sea of Ondra's Mortar, which protects the city of Ukaizo, just as Eothas makes his final approach to the Wheel, and confronts him there. Eothas, though sympathetic to the Watcher, refuses to back down from his endeavor, explaining to the Watcher that destroying the Wheel would most likely kill him and the rest of the gods for good, but that his death will also give him the power to enact a great change upon all of Eora. Before destroying the Wheel, he returns the piece of the Watcher's soul he took from him, thereby freeing him from the debt to Berath, and asks for his advice on what that change should be. An epilogue then follows, detailing the effects the Watcher's choices had on their companions, the different factions, the Deadfire, and the world at large. In the end, the Watcher resolves to head home to the Dyrwood, uncertain of what the future now holds for both gods and mortals.

== Development ==
The game was developed by Obsidian Entertainment, creators of the original Pillars of Eternity, and was published by Versus Evil with partial funding by Fig. In May 2016, Obsidian CEO Feargus Urquhart announced that the game had entered production. Like its predecessor, Obsidian chose to launch a crowdfunding campaign on Fig to raise money for the development. The campaign launched on January 26, 2017, with a funding goal of US$1.1 million with US$2.25 million open for equity. The funding goal was achieved in under 23 hours, and surpassed $4.4 million by the end of the campaign.

The game was released for Windows, Linux, and macOS on May 8, 2018, and was initially set to be released at a later date for Nintendo Switch, PlayStation 4, and Xbox One.

In January 2019, an update for the game was released that added a turn-based combat style. The sequel eventually launched for PlayStation 4 and Xbox One in January 2020, but the Nintendo Switch version was ultimately confirmed as cancelled by Versus Evil via their official Discord server in February 2022. This follows news from a year earlier when Versus Evil ceased releasing patches for the Switch version of Pillars of Eternity: Complete Edition, despite unresolved issues. Versus Evil cited the Switch's system limitations.

Pillars of Eternity design director Josh Sawyer explained that if the team were to create a sequel, they would set it in a different location within the game's fictional world to ensure the setting felt new and interesting. Sawyer stated that one focus of Deadfire was to address criticisms raised over the abundance of filler combat encounters in the original game. The game's size is significantly larger than the original.

In 2023, Sawyer felt that both Pillars of Eternity games were his most compromised works due to crowdfunding backers' demands for conservative game design instead of implementing his new ideas. He has also said that if he ever makes Pillars of Eternity 3, he would prefer to make the combat turn-based instead of using the real-time with pause system. The next game to make use of the setting was Avowed in 2025; this was instead a first-person ARPG.

=== Critical Role Pack ===
A downloadable content pack, Critical Role Pack was released for free alongside the game's launch, adding additional character voices and portraits from the first campaign of Critical Role. This included seven members of Vox Machina, plus Gilmore. The day after the pack was announced, it was revealed that all eight members of the Critical Role core cast would be voice acting non-player characters in the title. Matthew Mercer reprised his role as Edér, while the other cast members had new characters for the game.

== Reception ==
Reception

Aggregate score
Aggregator	Score
Metacritic	PC: 88/100; PS4: 77/100; PS4 (Ultimate Edition): 76/100

Review scores
Publication	Score
Eurogamer	Recommended
GameSpot	8/10
IGN	8.5/10
PC Gamer (US)	88/100

Pillars of Eternity II: Deadfire received "generally favorable" reviews from critics, according to review aggregator website Metacritic.

Josh Sawyer said that the game's sales were initially "relatively low" compared to their expectations but the game became more popular over time and by 2025 it became "very profitable".

Pillars of Eternity II: Deadfire was nominated for "Best Storytelling" and "PC Game of the Year" at the 2018 Golden Joystick Awards, for "Best Role-Playing Game" at The Game Awards 2018, for "Fan Favorite Role Playing Game" at the Gamers' Choice Awards, for "Role-Playing Game of the Year" at the 22nd Annual D.I.C.E. Awards, for "Outstanding Achievement in Videogame Writing" at the Writers Guild of America Awards 2018, for "Outstanding Video Game" at the 30th GLAAD Media Awards, and for "Adventure Game" and "Best Writing" at the 2019 Webby Awards.
