= The Outer Worlds 2 =

- Developer: Obsidian Entertainment (Note: Additional work by Aspiring Unicorn Games, Beamdog, Disruptive Games and Double Eleven)
- Publisher: Xbox Game Studios
- Directors: Brandon Adler; Leonard Boyarsky
- Producer: Tony Blackwell
- Designer: Matthew Singh
- Programmer: Mark DeGeorge
- Artist: Daniel Alpert
- Writer: Leonard Boyarsky
- Composers: Oleksa Lozowchuk; Antonio Gradanti
- Engine: Unreal Engine 5
- Platforms: PlayStation 5; Windows; Xbox Series X/S
- Release: October 29, 2025
- Genre: Action role-playing
- Mode: Single-player

The Outer Worlds 2 is a 2025 action role-playing game developed by Obsidian Entertainment and published by Xbox Game Studios. It is a standalone sequel to The Outer Worlds (2019), set in the Arcadia planetary system that has been invaded by a megacorporation. Players assume control of the protagonist, an Earth Directorate Agent, who is tasked with uncovering the source of emerging rifts that threaten to destroy the colony amidst a factional war.

In line with its predecessor, The Outer Worlds 2 features a first-person perspective, additionally, the ability to switch to a third-person perspective has been introduced to the series, which was unavailable in the first entry outside of limited sequences. The gameplay involves alternating between various combat, stealth and dialogue systems when encountering hostile non-playable characters in the overworld. The game also retains its predecessor's dialogue tree system which influences the branching story paths depending on how the player interacts with their party and other supporting characters throughout the narrative.

The Outer Worlds 2 began development shortly following the release of the first game in 2019, and had entered full development two years later. Tim Cain, who co-directed the first game before leaving Obsidian in 2020, remained involved as a creative consultant during production.

The Outer Worlds 2 was released for PlayStation 5, Windows, and Xbox Series X/S on October 29, 2025. The game received generally positive reviews from critics, but failed to meet the sales expectations of Xbox Game Studios.

== Gameplay ==
The Outer Worlds 2 is an action role-playing game that is played in either first-person or third-person perspective. Players can use melee weapons and firearms to defeat enemies. The game features an expanded selection of weapons, better visuals, and an increased focus on action compared to the first game, according to Obsidian Entertainment. It is set in a new star system with a new cast of characters.

== Synopsis ==
=== Setting ===
The Outer Worlds 2 takes place in an alternate timeline where the 1901 assassination of U.S. President William McKinley never occurred. As a result, he was never succeeded by Theodore Roosevelt, a vocal anti-monopolist who pushed to break up the growing business trusts of the time. Without his intervention, society eventually became dominated by autonomous megacorporations that maintained a rigid class system based on capitalism, wealth disparity, and brand loyalty. After a devastating global war in the mid-21st century, faster-than-light travel was invented, allowing humanity to colonize the universe with different intentions and fates for the various expeditions. The art, architecture, and technology of the various colonies scattered throughout the universe display a unique blend of Art Nouveau, Old West, steampunk, and dieselpunk aesthetics.

Set in the year 2361, the game takes place in Arcadia, a planetary system comprising the planets Hemera, Elysium, and Nyx. Most of the game's action takes place around Elysium's five moons: Eden, Dorado, Cloister, Praetor, and Recluse. The colony was initially controlled by the Protectorate, an authoritarian regime that traces its founding to the supposed inventor of faster-than-light travel, Alexandra Varick. Seeking to escape the powerful megacorporations of Earth, she led the initiative to colonize outer space, establishing humanity's first interstellar colony in Arcadia. Over a century later, the Protectorate has become increasingly oppressive and now maintains a cult of personality around Varick (posthumously known as the "Matriarch") and her descendants, enforcing their rule under threat of a form of chemical lobotomy known as “Mental Refreshment”. The Protectorate is currently ruled by the Matriarch's grandson Henry Varick, referred to as the "Sovereign". The regime also continues to be the colonies’ sole manufacturer of "skip drives", the technology that makes interstellar travel possible.

The player takes control of a commander of the Earth Directorate, an administrative body tasked with maintaining order throughout the colonies. The Commander and their team, on their ship the Incognito, are sent to Arcadia to investigate the appearance of interdimensional rifts that have cut off trade and communication between the colonies; if left unchecked, they threaten to destroy the entire universe. There, they come to find the Protectorate engaged in conflict against two factions: Auntie's Choice, a megacorporation that seeks to monopolize both the colony and skip-drive technology for profit; and the Order of the Ascendant, the Protectorate's former religious branch dedicated to academic research and enlightenment. The player has the choice of helping either, both, or even neither of these factions in the war for control of Arcadia.

=== Plot ===
In the year 2352, three years before the events of the first game, a team of Earth Directorate agents (led by the player character, referred to as the "Commander") are sent to Arcadia to investigate the sudden appearance of interdimensional rifts throughout the colonies. Following intelligence gathered by fellow agent Augustine de Vries, who had infiltrated the Protectorate before the team's arrival, they trace the origins of the rifts to Horizon Point Station, a skip drive manufacturing facility run by the Protectorate. During the infiltration, De Vries deviates from the team's directive and activates an experimental skip drive, creating a new rift that destroys the station. The Commander uses an escape pod to launch themselves into space, while nearly everyone left behind is killed.

Cryogenically frozen inside the pod, the Commander floats in space for nine years before being rescued by Niles Abara, a rookie Earth Directorate agent who also narrowly survived Horizon Point's destruction. He reveals that De Vries escaped as well, and that he has spent the last decade trying to find her and seek vengeance for the rest of the team's deaths. He also explains that in the time that has passed, the megacorporation Auntie's Choice (a merger of pharmaceuticals company Auntie Cleo's and consumer goods manufacturer Spacer's Choice) is three years into an invasion of Arcadia, seeking to claim both the Protectorate's skip-drive technology and the system's wealth of natural resources. Additionally, the Protectorate's official religious institution, the Order of the Ascendant, split from the regime shortly after the invasion and is now engaged in conflict with the other two factions.

Tracking down De Vries, the duo learns that while undercover within the Protectorate, she became enamored by the Order's doctrine of arithmetically-based predestination known as the Universal Equation and joined a splinter group of renegades with an extremist interpretation of the creed. The Commander, Niles, and their growing team of allies confront each of De Vries’ conspirators and eventually learn of her plans to disrupt the ongoing peace talks between the Order and Auntie's Choice by assassinating their delegates. At the space station where the negotiations are taking place, the team intervenes, at which point De Vries reveals that her actions on Horizon Point were intended to prevent both the Protectorate and Auntie's Choice from ultimately using skip-drive technology to inadvertently open more rifts and destroy the universe, as had been predicted by the Universal Equation. The player is able to either kill or spare De Vries, with the latter option potentially leading to the deaths of the peace delegates. Regardless of either outcome, another rift suddenly opens and destroys the station, with all surviving parties narrowly escaping.

In order to close the rifts permanently, the team use data collected by De Vries to determine their strategy, which includes stealing a “Rift Anomaly Modulator” from a Protectorate research facility that has the power to both close rifts and recover what was lost inside them. They also learn that the Earth Directorate, unable to directly contact the team sent to Arcadia, had launched a satellite containing all research relating to rifts. The density of the data requires using an AI-operated supercomputer in the Order's Archives, which are currently controlled by the Protectorate. To aid in retaking the Archives, the team can choose to ally themselves with the Order or Auntie's Choice, or (if the peace delegates were kept alive) even encourage the two factions to collaborate. Meanwhile, the Protectorate formally announces via system-wide broadcast that the Sovereign has "voluntarily" submitted himself for Mental Refreshment, allowing his Consul, Emory Thoreau, to rule in his place. The team immediately recognizes this sudden transfer of power to be a bloodless coup.

After tasking the Archive's computer with decrypting and analyzing the data, Horizon Point Station suddenly reappears, albeit in a decayed state. They determine that Thoreau has used the Protectorate's resources to manipulate the rift, but that it is quickly growing unstable. The team fight their way through the remains of the station (including the warped victims of Horizon Point's destruction) and infiltrate Thoreau's flagship, where they find a larger and more powerful Rift Modulator. Upon confronting Thoreau, he reveals that the Protectorate's research has concluded that rifts retain the essence of everything they consume, but never in its entirety. For humans, this means that while a person's body and consciousness can be recovered, most of their personality and identity is lost. With this knowledge, Thoreau plans to maximize the rift to consume all of Arcadia, then reconstruct it according to his ideals (despite his researchers' findings that the rifts cannot be controlled in such a way). The Consul may be talked into surrendering or killed in combat, but in either case, the rift begins to grow increasingly unstable. As Rift Modulators are required to be in close proximity to a rift in order to close it, the team concludes that someone must pilot the ship into the rift, which would kill the pilot and anyone left onboard.

At this point, the game's ending is largely determined by the player's past choices. The "best" ending occurs if Thoreau is kept alive, in which case he chooses to redeem himself by piloting the ship and closing the rifts. Additionally, if De Vries was spared during the peace talks, she will volunteer as well. Most of the other endings involve either the Commander or one of their allies piloting the ship (whether voluntarily or under threat by the Commander). The "worst" ending, only possible if the player character carries the "Dumb" trait, sees the Commander simply choose to do nothing, allowing the rifts to expand and kill everyone in Arcadia.

The epilogue summarises the fates of the surviving characters and factions depending on the choices made by the player during their personal quests. Ultimately, with its leaders either dead or incapacitated, the Protectorate quietly collapses, and peace is restored to Arcadia according to the ideals of the faction(s) that the Commander supported. Meanwhile, Earth remains silent and cut off from the colonies, its fate unknown.

== Development ==
During development of the first game, Obsidian Entertainment was acquired by Microsoft and integrated as a first-party developer for Xbox Game Studios in November 2018. While the arrangement did not affect the game's original distribution plans, Microsoft acquired all publishing duties for "future iterations" of The Outer Worlds from Private Division by May 2021. A sequel to the game had entered development in September 2019, two months before The Outer Worlds launched.

In January 2024, The Outer Worlds director Tim Cain, who left Obsidian in 2020 and considered himself retired from the games industry, revealed that he remained attached to The Outer Worlds 2 as a creative consultant during its production. Cain praised the game's team as they had "figured out" a solution to a specific problem the developer had continued to struggle with across all his previous titles, referencing production notes he recalled from creating the original Fallout in 1997, and he frequently assisted staff in identifying "pitfalls" in the game's overall quality. In August 2024, Obsidian CEO Feargus Urquhart provided an update on the game, saying it "is looking incredible" despite conflicts with the game's planned production timeline.

== Release ==
The Outer Worlds 2 was announced at the Xbox & Bethesda Games Showcase during Electronic Entertainment Expo (E3) 2021, where it was slated for release on Windows and Xbox Series X/S as a console-exclusive. At the time of announcement, the game had just entered full production, and the game's accompanying trailer broke the fourth wall by addressing the fact the studio did not have any gameplay or materials ready to be shown by then. A full trailer unveiling gameplay and story details was presented at The Game Awards (TGA) in December 2024, which additionally confirmed a 2025 launch window, making it the second Obsidian-developed title to release that year following Avowed that February. The game was also now slated to have a simultaneous multiplatform release, with a PlayStation 5 version planned to launch alongside the Xbox and PC releases. The game was the subject of a special Direct presentation that aired immediately following the Xbox Games Showcase on June 8, 2025.

The Outer Worlds 2 was released for PlayStation 5, Windows, and Xbox Series X/S on October 29, 2025. It was made available to subscribers of select Xbox Game Pass plans on release day, including Xbox Game Pass Ultimate and PC Game Pass. It was originally going to be the first title from Xbox Game Studios to launch at US$79.99, following Microsoft's commitment to the price point for new major releases going forward. However, on July 23, 2025, the official Outer Worlds Twitter/X account announced that the game will now cost US$69.99, instead of the original price of US$79.99.

The first expansion pack, titled Side Effect Guaranteed, is set to be released on December 2, 2026. It introduces a new region, a new recruitable character, as well as additional flaws and gear. The second expansion, which continues the story, is set to be released in early 2027.

== Reception ==
Reception

Aggregate scores
Aggregator	Score
Metacritic	(PC) 81/100 (PS5) 79/100 (XSXS) 83/100
OpenCritic	88% recommend

Review scores
Publication	Score
Destructoid	9/10
Eurogamer	4/5
Famitsu	7/10, 9/10, 9/10, 8/10
Game Informer	8.75/10
GameSpot	8/10
GamesRadar+	4.5/5
Hardcore Gamer	4.5/5
IGN	8/10
PC Gamer (US)	83/100
Push Square	7/10
RPGamer	2/5
RPGFan	62/100
Video Games Chronicle	3/5
VideoGamer.com	8/10

=== Critical reception ===
The Outer Worlds 2 received "generally favorable" reviews from critics, according to review aggregator website Metacritic. OpenCritic determined that 88% of critics recommended the game. In Japan, four critics from Famitsu gave the game a total score of 33 out of 40.

The game was nominated for Best Role Playing Game at The Game Awards 2025, and for Role-Playing Game of the Year at the 29th Annual D.I.C.E. Awards.

=== Sales ===
In February 2026, it was revealed that The Outer Worlds 2 had failed to meet the sales expectations of Xbox Game Studios, and that a sequel to the game is not currently planned.
