= Tyranny (video game) =

2016 video game

- Developer: Obsidian Entertainment
- Publisher: Paradox Interactive
- Director: Brian Heins
- Producer: Matthew Singh
- Programmer: Dan Spitzley
- Artist: Brian Menze
- Writer: Matt MacLean
- Composer: Justin Bell
- Engine: Unity
- Platforms: Linux; macOS; Microsoft Windows
- Release: November 10, 2016
- Genre: Role-playing
- Mode: Single-player

Tyranny is a role-playing video game developed by Obsidian Entertainment and published by Paradox Interactive. The game was released for Microsoft Windows, OS X, and Linux on November 10, 2016.

While not a sequel, Tyranny builds upon the gameplay and engine used in Obsidian's previous title Pillars of Eternity, allowing the developers to spend more time on crafting a game where player choices have a more meaningful effect on the game's story. The game starts after the evil overlord Kyros has already conquered the world, and where the player-character, a Fatebinder, is one of the higher-ranked members in Kyros' power structure. As a Fatebinder, the player must travel the world to help restore order after Kyros' victory, and make decisions on how to handle the various factions of survivors, which can affect what companions, spells, and abilities the player may select from.

== Synopsis ==
=== Setting ===
Tyranny takes place on Terratus, a high fantasy world where technology is transitioning from the Bronze Age to the Iron Age. The Overlord Kyros, a god-like being of immeasurable power, is close to completing their over-400-year-long campaign to conquer Terratus and impose order, having already overtaken much of the land through force or intimidation. As part of Kyros' public persona, Kyros has remained unseen, leaving their subjects unsure if Kyros is male or female, a team, a title handed down in a dynasty, or a multi-headed beast. Beneath Kyros are the Archons, men and women imbued with strange and unique magical powers, made seemingly immortal by Kyros. Archons rule over regions, districts, armies, or individual groups on Kyros' behalf. Archons in Tyranny include executioner Bleden Mark, Archon of Shadows; the plague-spreading Pox, Archon of Ruin; the mighty Cairn, Archon of Stone; and Tunon the Adjudicator, Archon of Justice and creator of the Fatebinders. Fatebinders are high ranked agents in Kyros' forces, tasked to travel the world to restore order, reduce conflict, and maintain Kyros' rule, serving as judge, jury, and executioner.

Tyranny takes place in the 431st year of Kyros' self-devised calendar in the region of the Tiers, the final major area to be conquered. There is a rebellion brewing due to infighting between Kyros' two main forces in the Tiers: the elite and disciplined Disfavored led by Graven Ashe, Archon of War; and the chaotic and barbarian Scarlet Chorus led by the Voices of Nerat, Archon of Secrets. The player takes the role of a Fatebinder, tasked by Kyros to quell the rebellion or be destroyed along with everyone else in Vendrien's Well.

During the Fatebinder's quest, they can recruit a number of companions including: the mage Sirin, Archon of Song; the uncompromising Barik of the Stone Shields; the fierce warrior Verse; the sage Lantry; the water mage Eb; and the humanoid, feral beastwoman Kills-in-Shadow.

The world of Tyranny also features a number of colossal ruins from a previous, unknown civilization. These include the Oldwalls, magically attuned spans of walls that run for hundreds of miles, and the Spires, monolithic towers that reach higher into the sky than most mountains. For reasons unknown, Kyros forbids entry to the Oldwalls on pain of death, but makes no explicit mention of the Spires.

=== Plot ===
The game begins several years after the conquest of the Tiers, the last major region that resisted Kyros' rule. A new rebellion has risen in the Tiers kingdom of Apex, in the region of Vendrien's Well, and Kyros has grown angry with her armies' failure to quell it. The Fatebinder is dispatched to Vendrien's Well to resolve the bickering generals' disputes and end the siege of the rebel fortress, or every living thing in that region will be destroyed by one of Kyros' Edicts, a form of magical superweapon and one of the few ways Kyros directly enforces order throughout the realm. Working together with Graven Ashe, Archon of War and leader of the Disfavored, and the Voices of Nerat, Archon of Secrets and leader of the Scarlet Chorus, the Fatebinder fights their way through the rebel forces to reach their fortress of Ascension Hall. When the time comes to assault the fortress, however, the feud between the two Archons climaxes – after the Fatebinder chooses one of the two armies to lead the assault, the other declares war on the opposing army in outrage. Despite this sudden conflict, the Fatebinder penetrates Ascension Hall and ends the siege with the help of their chosen army. Alternatively the Fatebinder could have secretly allied themselves with the rebels and betrayed both Archons. However, after fulfilling the terms of the Edict and ending the siege, the diffused magic alters the Fatebinder in unforeseen ways.

The Fatebinder finds themselves absorbing the power of Kyros' Edict and transported to the summit of the Mountain Spire, the monolithic ancient tower at the centre of Ascension Hall and one of many Spires that dot the Tiers and Northern Empire. The Fatebinder is the first person in recorded history to do so, causing much debate in Imperial and Tiersman circles. Meanwhile, the feud between Ashe and Nerat boils over into a fullscale civil war, the 'War of Archons', with the Disfavored and Scarlet Chorus battling for control of the Tiers. Tunon summons the Fatebinder to his court in the Bastard City to account for their actions and tasks them with investigating both Archons for treason, as this civil war has jeopardized the pacification of the region. Allying themselves with one of the armies in the war, or neither and following their own path or fighting for the rebels, the Fatebinder sets out to discover the nature of their newfound power and their connection with the Spires, claiming new Spires and growing in power along the way.

In the process of aiding in the war effort for either side, or acting to help the people of the Tiers or advance their own power, the Fatebinder finds themselves ending the three remaining Edicts of Kyros in the Tiers and absorbing their power. By killing the newborn Regent of Stalwart, or exploiting an ancient legal loophole renouncing her claims to the throne, the Fatebinder ends the Edict of Storms that had ravaged the Blade Grave. By destroying or claiming for themselves the Silent Archive of the Sages from the Burning Library, the Fatebinder ends the Edict of Fire. By killing the petrified Archon of Stone, Cairn, either by releasing his power in a pulse that made the land unlivable or by a safer method, the Fatebinder ends the Edict of Stone in the Stone Sea. Once these have been completed, enemy forces attack the Fatebinder's original Spire at Vendrien's Well. In order to defeat the enemy, the Fatebinder channels their new power into the resonator atop the Spire, casting their own Edict without Kyros – implying that Kyros' own power may have originated from the Spires.

The Fatebinder's Edict breaks the enemy army, but new threats emerge. The fact that anyone other than the Overlord could cast an Edict spreads fear and awe across the world and the Fatebinder is now officially recognized by Kyros as an Archon – some ever whisper the possibility of a new Overlord. Kyros decrees that only one Archon in the Tiers may rule the territory and orders them to fight to the death or swear loyalty. Additionally, Tunon summons the Fatebinder to court once more, Bleden Mark, Archon of Shadows, makes plans to assassinate the Fatebinder, and Kyros silently dispatches additional armies under Pox, Archon of Ruin, to wipe out the remaining combatants.

The Fatebinder can kill Ashe, Nerat and Bleden Mark individually or travel at once to Tunon's court to face justice. At the court the Fatebinder must first present their evidence for the guilt of one or both of the Archons – a guilty verdict results in their execution by Bleden Mark, if he still lives. The second court case is the Fatebinder's, pleading the case for their treasonous actions in the Tiers. If the player successfully argues their case Tunon will declare the Fatebinder a greater servant of law and order than Kyros and pledge his fealty. Bleden Mark, if he still lives and has not been turned to the Fatebinder's cause, then attempts to kill the Fatebinder in Kyros' name. If the Fatebinder fails to convince Tunon, both he and Mark (if still alive) must be fought and killed.

With all opposition in the Tiers defeated or in their service, it is uncovered that Kyros is sending another army to retake the Tiers from whatever Archon is left. The Fatebinder must either surrender or retaliate by casting an Edict on Kyros's capital. The edict devastates the Imperial Throne; thousands begin to doubt the Empire's power and flock to the Fatebinder's banner as a new Overlord. Pox's armies are given the order to retreat – a first for Kyros – and reinforce order as rebellions arise at home. If the Fatebinder surrenders and pledges loyalty, Kyros accepts the surrender and pulls the armies back, allowing the Fatebinder to rule over the Tiers as an Archon for the time being. The Fatebinder ponders on the future of the Tiers and the Empire as the game ends.

== Gameplay ==
Tyranny is a computer role-playing game (RPG) using isometric user interface similar to Obsidian's Pillars of Eternity. Players take the role of the Fatebinder. The game opens in a board game-like Conquest mode that ties in with the character creation process. During Conquest mode, the player makes decisions on how the world was conquered by Kyros and the Fatebinder's role in that. These decisions affect the state of the game's world and how various non-playable characters (NPC) react to the Fatebinder, particularly the various factions with which the Fatebinder can become allies or foes. The Fatebinder character is class-less, instead allowing the player to define the character's strength and weaknesses through a skill-based system that is based on how frequent they use certain skills. The Fatebinder may gain NPC companions over the course of the game. The Fatebinder has abilities in combat that can be influenced by which factions the character is aligned with, as well as combination attacks with companion NPCs. The player is able to craft magic spells for the Fatebinder; each spell starts with a core attribute representing its elemental power such as fire or ice, and its appearance in use such as a directed bolt or a wide-range cone. From there, the player can add accents that affect the strength, range, and other factors of the spell. Each added accent costs lore (points earned in the game), thus limiting how powerful the crafted spell can be.

Decisions made by the player both at character creation and later in the game affect the game's world, making some conversation tree choices critical. For example, a certain decision may cause a magical fissure to open through the center of one of the towns, killing some NPCs and forcing the other NPCs to relocate to a neighboring town, altering the NPCs' attitude towards the Fatebinder and what quests may be available. Due to the importance of these decisions, the player earns experience points for conversations as they would for participating in battles.

Tyranny contains a number of options to adjust the difficulty of the game, in response to players' concerns from Pillars of Eternity.

== Development ==
The key concepts of Tyranny started with ideas in Obsidian Entertainment for a role-playing game called Fury that they attempted to pitch in 2006, according to Obsidian CEO Feargus Urquhart. Fury would have featured a land ravaged by a "magical apocalypse". Obsidian refined this idea for a new game Defiance that they started pitching in 2009, which now featured a land where evil had already won. Several ideas from Defiance were used to craft a new concept for Stormlands, a game the studio successfully pitched to Microsoft as a potential launch title for the Xbox One in 2012. Urquhart noted that Stormlands bore more resemblance to Fury than Defiance at this point. However, due to uncertainty in the video game market at that time, the game was canceled, and Obsidian was forced to release 30 of its employees and put the studio at serious financial instability; however, the studio held onto the rights for Stormlands. Obsidian was able to recover financially through the Kickstarter-backed role-playing game Pillars of Eternity, which allowed them to return to the concepts from Fury, Defiance and Stormlands and build out a new title, Tyranny. Urquhart stated that, with Tyranny, they refined the Defiance idea more to make sure that the player was clearly aware that evil has won and having their character being part of that conquest. Game director Brian Heins said they wanted to avoid the "moustache-twiddling" type of villainy in the game's concept, instead to allow the player to find a way for a villainous character to still become the hero of their own story. The developers also desired to make decisions made by the player have important ramifications, such as if the player opted to play as a "good" character acting against Kyros that they would find they would quickly make a lot of enemies by those decisions.

Tyranny uses a modified version of the Unity engine used as the basis of Pillars of Eternity. Heins said that since most of the technical issues of graphics and rendering were also solved with Pillars, they were free to flesh out "a different type of [role-playing game]". Tyranny uses a skill-based growth system rather than a class-based one as with Pillars. Heins said that they wanted to allow players to find ways to play a character they wanted instead of forced into a defined class. They also wanted to make sure that players could work to revamp characters mid-way through the game without penalty, avoiding the situation where a player may have built out a character that is difficult to use to progress into the late-game.

Veteran designer Chris Avellone, who left Obsidian in June 2015, had worked on the early development of Tyranny, according to Heins; Heins noted that "Some of the concepts of this [intellectual property] were constructed by Chris, some of the characters have the same names he gave them and the same ideas." Much of the game involves making human non-player-characters suffer under the Fatebinder's orders; according to director Brian Heins, the team was prepared to handle the type of depictions of these acts, as many had worked on South Park: The Stick of Truth, which had similar levels of crude and vulgar humor.

=== Promotion ===
Tyranny was announced at the 2016 Game Developers Conference in March 2016, and was exhibited in a playable demonstration form at the Electronic Entertainment Expo 2016 that June; the E3 demo included the same battle though presented from three different scenarios based on the choices the player would have made earlier in the game, as to demonstrate how these choices affected combat and gameplay.

Tyranny has been released on Microsoft Windows, OS X, and Linux systems on November 10, 2016. In addition to the standard game, there are two special editions: the Archon edition includes the game's soundtrack and other digital art assets, while the Overlord edition further includes a digital artbook and collector's guide.

== Reception ==
Reception

Aggregate score
Aggregator	Score
Metacritic	80/100

Review scores
Publication	Score
Destructoid	7/10
Game Informer	8.3/10
GameSpot	8/10
IGN	8.3/10
PC Gamer (US)	7.5/10
Polygon	7.5/10

Tyranny received positive reviews upon its release; it is currently listed on Metacritic with a score of 80/100 based on 67 reviews, indicating "generally favorable reviews". Praise was given to the game's deep exploration of evil, as well as its world building and mysteries. Criticisms were leveled at its combat AI, and the abrupt end to the story.

== See also ==
- List of Paradox Interactive games
- List of PC games
