= Darren Monahan =

Video game producer

- Occupation: Programmer
- Employer: Obsidian Entertainment
- Known for: Role-playing video games

Darren Monahan is the chief information officer and producer of Obsidian Entertainment and one of Obsidian's founders. Monahan works in the game industry, having worked for Interplay Entertainment in various capacities, including as a senior producer for Black Isle Studios, manager of quality assurance, and a programmer on many of Interplay's titles. As a producer, Monahan managed the development of six published products, including the entire Icewind Dale and Baldur's Gate: Dark Alliance series.

== Career ==
Darren Monahan started out in the quality assurance department for Interplay Entertainment. Monahan met Feargus Urquhart while working in QA on one of his titles. Monahan then moved out of QA to become a programmer as part of Interplay's Tech Group. Monohan worked on Redneck Rampage Rides Again, credited with the redbook, autorun, and miscellaneous programming. Monahan later transferred to Black Isle Studios and became an associate producer on Icewind Dale. Monahan was the producer for Baldur's Gate: Dark Alliance at Black Isle Studios. He also produced Icewind Dale II.

Monahan was one of five developers who formed Obsidian Entertainment in June 2003, along with Chris Parker, Urquhart, Chris Jones and Chris Avellone. The five friends held a brainstorming session at the home of Chris Parker, where Monahan, Urquhart and Parker decided that between the three possible names of Three Clown Software, Scorched Earth and Obsidian, they liked Obsidian the least, since it reminded them of Black Isle. Monahan, Parker, and Urquhart used their credit cards to pay for most of the startup costs, with the total investment somewhere between $100,000 to $125,000. Monahan was the executive producer on Neverwinter Nights 2. Monahan, along with the other four company owners, was responsible for developing role-playing game titles including Fallout and Knights of the Old Republic II.
