= Feargus Urquhart =

Scottish-American video game developer

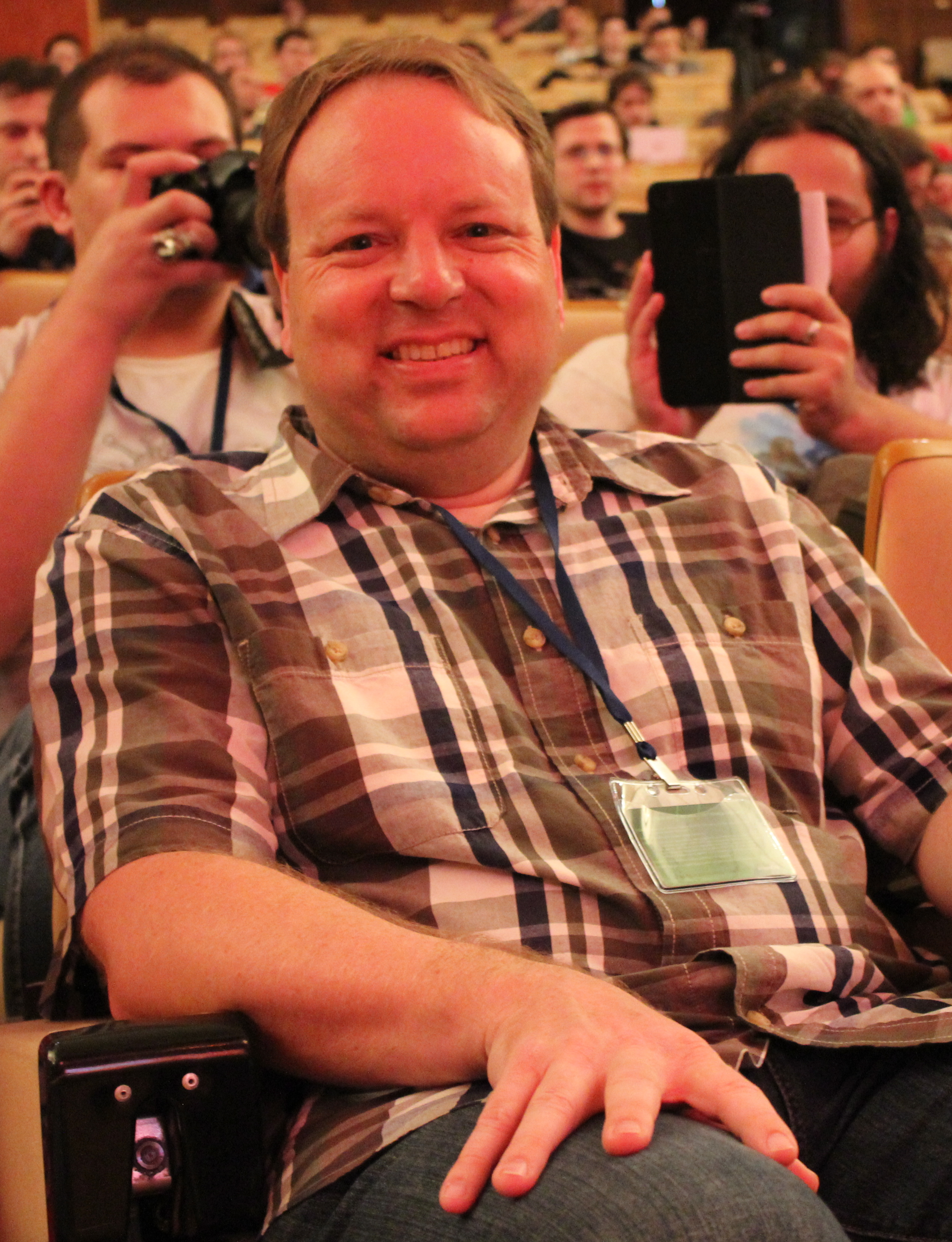
- Urquhart at KRI 2013 in Moscow
- Occupations: Video game designer CEO of Obsidian Entertainment
- Spouse: Margo
- Children: 2

Feargus Urquhart is a Scottish-American video game designer and CEO of Obsidian Entertainment.

== Career ==
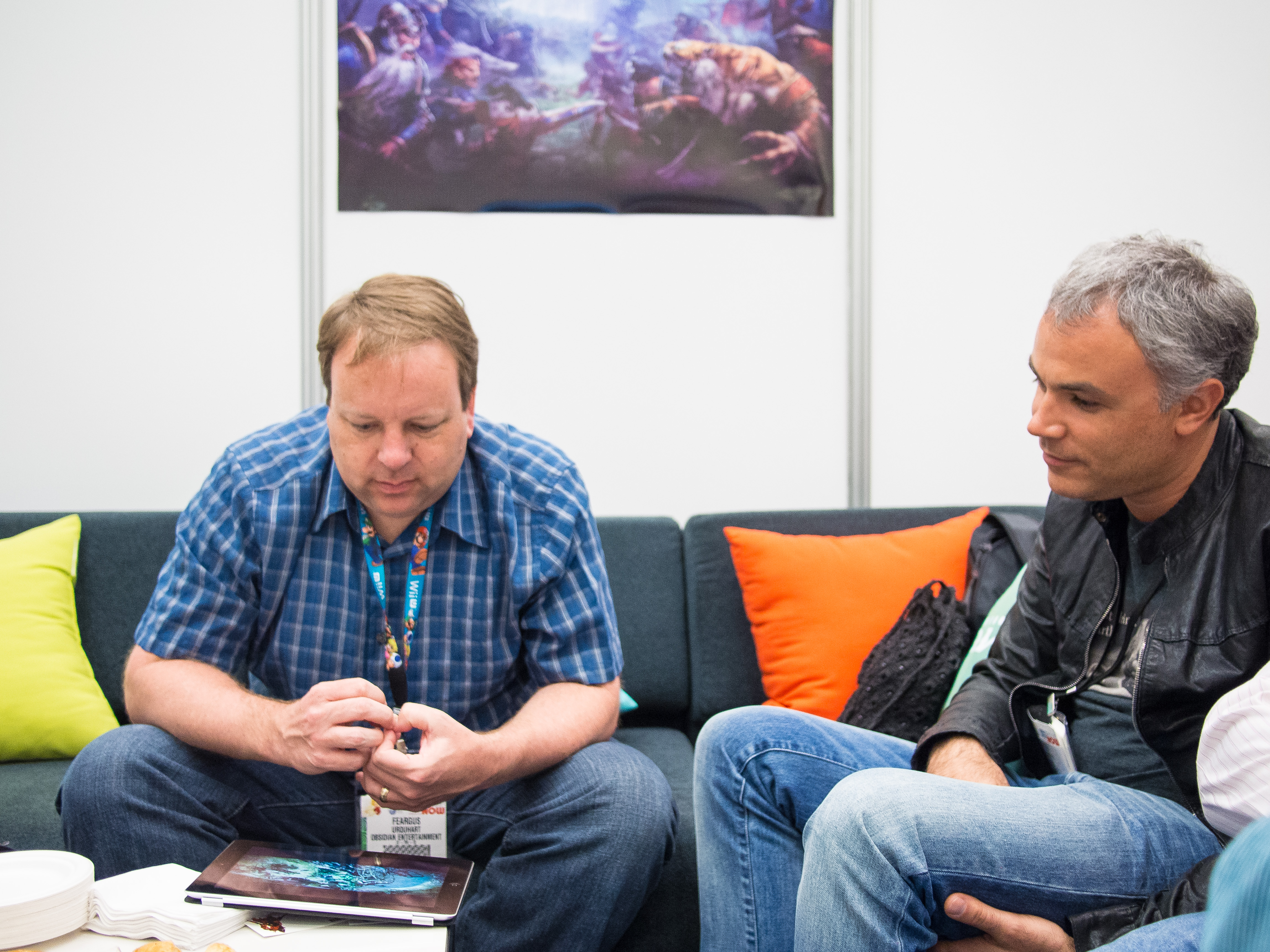
Urquhart with Sergey Orlovskiy at E3 2013

Urquhart is best known for his work at Interplay Entertainment, particularly as leader of Black Isle Studios, Interplay's internal role-playing video game division which Urquhart established in 1997. With them, Urquhart worked on the first two Fallout games.

When Interplay ran into financial difficulties and Black Isle's future became uncertain, Urquhart and several other industry veterans departed to found Obsidian Entertainment, in 2003.

== Personal life ==
Urquhart resides in West Irvine, California. He and his wife Margo have two children: Katie and Aidan.

== Games ==
Year	Title	Role(s)
1991	The Bard's Tale Construction Set	Tester
1992	Out of This World	Tester
1992	Castles II: Siege & Conquest	Additional design, lead tester
1993	Claymates	Writer
1993	ClayFighter	Writer
1994	Rock n' Roll Racing	Producer
1994	Heart of the Alien	Line producer
1995	Blackthorne	Producer
1995	Zombie Dinos from Planet Zeltoid	Producer
1996	Blood & Magic	Foreman
1996	Pro Pinball: The Web	Division director
1996	Shattered Steel	Producer
1996	Solitaire Deluxe	Associate producer
1997	Star Trek: Starfleet Academy	Special thanks
1997	The Forgotten Realms Archives	Product manager
1997	Norse by Norse West: The Return of the Lost Vikings	Producer
1997	Fallout	Division director
1997	Descent to Undermountain	Division director
1998	The Ultimate RPG Archives	Division director
1998	Baldur's Gate	Division director
1998	Ultimate Might and Magic Archives	Division director
1998	Fallout 2	Designer, producer, division director
1998	Red Asphalt	Producer, division director
1998	The Ultimate Wizardry Archives	Division director
1999	Planescape: Torment	Division director
1999	Freespace 2	Division director
1999	Baldur's Gate: Tales of the Sword Coast	Project manager
2000	Icewind Dale	Division director
2000	MDK 2	Special thanks
2000	Baldur's Gate II: Shadows of Amn	Division director
2001	Icewind Dale: Heart of Winter	Division director
2001	Baldur's Gate II: Throne of Bhaal	Project manager
2001	Baldur's Gate: Dark Alliance	"El Presidente"
2002	Neverwinter Nights	Original producer
2002	Icewind Dale II	Division director
2003	Lionheart: Legacy of the Crusader	Division director
2004	Baldur's Gate: Dark Alliance II	Special thanks
2004	Star Wars Knights of the Old Republic II: The Sith Lords	CEO, president, executive producer
2006	Neverwinter Nights 2	CEO, president
2007	Neverwinter Nights 2: Mask of the Betrayer	CEO, president
2008	Neverwinter Nights 2: Storm of Zehir	CEO, president
2010	God of War: Ghost of Sparta	Special thanks
2010	Alpha Protocol	CEO, president
2010	Fallout: New Vegas	CEO, president
2011	Dungeon Siege III	CEO, president
2013	Horizon	Special thanks
2014	South Park: The Stick of Truth	CEO, president
2015	Pillars of Eternity	CEO, president
2016	Tyranny	CEO, president
2017	Pathfinder Adventures	CEO, president
2017	Armored Warfare	CEO, president
2017	Dead Alliance	Special thanks
2018	Pillars of Eternity II: Deadfire	CEO, president
2019	The Outer Worlds	Studio head
2020	Grounded	Studio head
2022	Black Geyser: Couriers of Darkness	Special thanks
2022	Pentiment	Studio head
2025	Avowed	Executive Producer
2025	Grounded 2	Studio head
2025	The Outer Worlds 2	Studio head

== Awards ==
In 1999, IGN's RPG Vault gave him the award for an Unsung Hero of the Year, stating that "since he is always quick to deflect credit away from himself, the great majority of fans remain unaware of Feargus' actual contributions to Black Isle's titles. We won't give away his secrets other than to say we consider him a very worthy initial winner of this award."
