= Pillars of Eternity: The White March =

- Cover for The White March – Part I
- Developer: Obsidian Entertainment
- Publisher: Paradox Interactive
- Director: Josh Sawyer
- Producer: Justin Britch
- Designers: Josh Sawyer; Bobby Null; Eric Fenstermaker
- Programmer: Adam Brennecke
- Artist: Rob Nesler
- Writers: Eric Fenstermaker; Carrie Patel; Olivia Veras
- Composer: Justin E. Bell
- Engine: Unity
- Platforms: Microsoft Windows, OS X, Linux, Xbox One, PlayStation 4, Nintendo Switch
- Release: Part I: WW: August 25, 2015; Part II: WW: February 16, 2016; PlayStation 4, Xbox One: WW: August 29, 2017; Nintendo Switch: WW: August 8, 2019
- Genre: Role-playing
- Mode: Single-player

Pillars of Eternity: The White March is a two-part expansion pack for the 2015 role-playing video game Pillars of Eternity, developed by Obsidian Entertainment and published by Paradox Interactive. The first part was released on August 25, 2015, while the second was released on February 16, 2016.

The White March – Part I added several new features to the base game, such as an increased level cap and new abilities, along with new companions. The White March – Part II also adds a new companion along with a new Story Time difficulty mode in its accompanying patch. The main quest line of the expansion has the protagonist, the Watcher, go on a search to find a white forge on the mountainous region of the White March at the request of the village of Stalwart. By reactivating it, the Watcher awakens powerful entities who threaten to destroy the Dyrwood if not stopped.

Critical reception for The White March – Part I was generally favorable. Reviewers praised the expansion for expanding on the game with more quests; however, some criticized it for its excessive focus on combat and for being too similar to the base game. Reviews for Part II were more positive, with critics praising its storytelling and the role-playing available to the player.

== Gameplay ==
The gameplay of The White March is mostly unchanged from Pillars of Eternity. As with the base game, the player controls a party of up to six characters through adventures. Several new features are added with the expansion's accompanying patches, which include an artificial intelligence system for party members, which lets the player choose if they are "aggressive" or "defensive" during battles, and also has an option for them to use abilities which can only be used a set number of times per resting automatically, and a Story Time difficulty mode which allows the player to advance through the game faster.

The expansion is set in the new area of the White March. In addition, the expansion also adds Crägholdt, a dungeon which is accessed separately from White March. The expansion content is optional to complete, and it can also be freely accessed at any time after the player acquires the stronghold. The level cap has been raised from 12 to 14 in Part I, and is further increased in Part II to level 16. Obsidian Entertainment said that the recommended level to start the expansion is level 7, and over leveled characters will have the option to upscale the difficulty. Several new spells and abilities were introduced along with the level cap increase. Also added are Soulbound weapons, which can be bound to characters to increase their damage over time. Both parts of the expansion add a total of around 20 hours to the game.

== Plot ==
Skeletal remains of the god Abydon, in the Abbey of the Fallen Moon.

=== Setting and characters ===
The White March mostly takes place north of the country of Dyrwood in the fantasy world of Eora, in a snowy region called the White March. The quest line of the expansion is done during the base game, integrating into it seamlessly. One of the new locations is the Abbey of the Fallen Moon, a sacred site for Ondra, the goddess of the sea. Gods, such as Ondra and Abydon, are a driving force behind the plot. The expansion adds several new party members, including the Devil of Caroc, a construct rogue who was a murderer in her days as a human; Zahua, a monk with a love for drugs and philosophy; and Maneha, a kindhearted barbarian.

=== Story ===
Part I: After the Watcher acquires the stronghold Caed Nua, the steward notifies him or her that the village of Stalwart is in need of aid to awaken the white forges in an ancient dwarven fortress, Durgan's Battery. The mayor, Renengild, explains to the protagonist that they need the White Forge to help the village recover from the harsh times they have been going through recently. She tells the Watcher she has already sent several expeditions to the Battery, but none have managed to breach it. When the Watcher enters Durgan's Battery and finds the White Forge, they find out that the dwarves working there used it to bind themselves to the fortress. The player has a choice between releasing them to the Wheel to find new life, binding them to the cannons to defend the forge, or to bind them to the White Forge so they can stay and tend to their legacy.

Part II: Some time since the Watcher has left the White March after awakening the White Forge, the character has a dream where they see an army marching down from the snowy mountains who will cause destruction unless they are stopped. When the player returns to the region, there is a concern over a group of Raedcerans, known as the Iron Flail, who want to claim the White Forge for themselves. When the Watcher goes to their base to try and control the situation, it is ambushed by strange, tall creatures. The Watcher finds out these are called the Eyeless, and that they are from the army the Watcher saw in their dream.

The player tracks down the location of the Abbey of the Fallen Moon. The player finds out that the leader of the location can help call off the army. After the leader instructs them, the Watcher enters the reliquary, in the center of which there is a giant skull. Examining the skull starts a conversation with the goddess Ondra. The player finds out that she is angry with them for awakening the White Forge, saying it should have been forgotten. Ondra tells the Watcher that she summoned the army of the Eyeless to hide her secrets. Ondra is the goddess of forgetting: she believes that forgetting is preferable to living with the burden of remembering. She killed the god of smithery and preservation, Abydon, the creator of the Eyeless, because he went too far against her wishes. Ondra explains that she has since discovered that her control over the Eyeless is limited, since she is not their creator, so she is unable call them off again, and therefore needs a mortal agent to stop them. The Watcher volunteers for this role.

Ondra tells the player that in order to destroy the Eyeless, a crystal fragment of the fallen moon called the Ionni Brathr must be shattered. The player travels to the location of the crystal in Cayron's Scar where he finds out from Ondra that smashing the crystal will call forth the Eyeless who will assist in shattering it. However, it must be smashed repeatedly for the Eyeless to continue helping. This means that the person who remains with the crystal will die. Depending on the player's choices, everybody in the party can survive, but it is possible for either the Watcher or one of their companions to permanently die.

After the crystal shatters and if the player survives, the Eyeless begin talking with the Watcher, who ask them why they are trying to kill them. They tell the player that their main objective is preservation. When the player tells them what Ondra said, they say that she changed them into destroyers against their will. They tell the Watcher that they want to return to themselves to restore Abydon. The player has a choice between destroying them and Abydon's memory or allowing them to return to themselves.

== Development ==
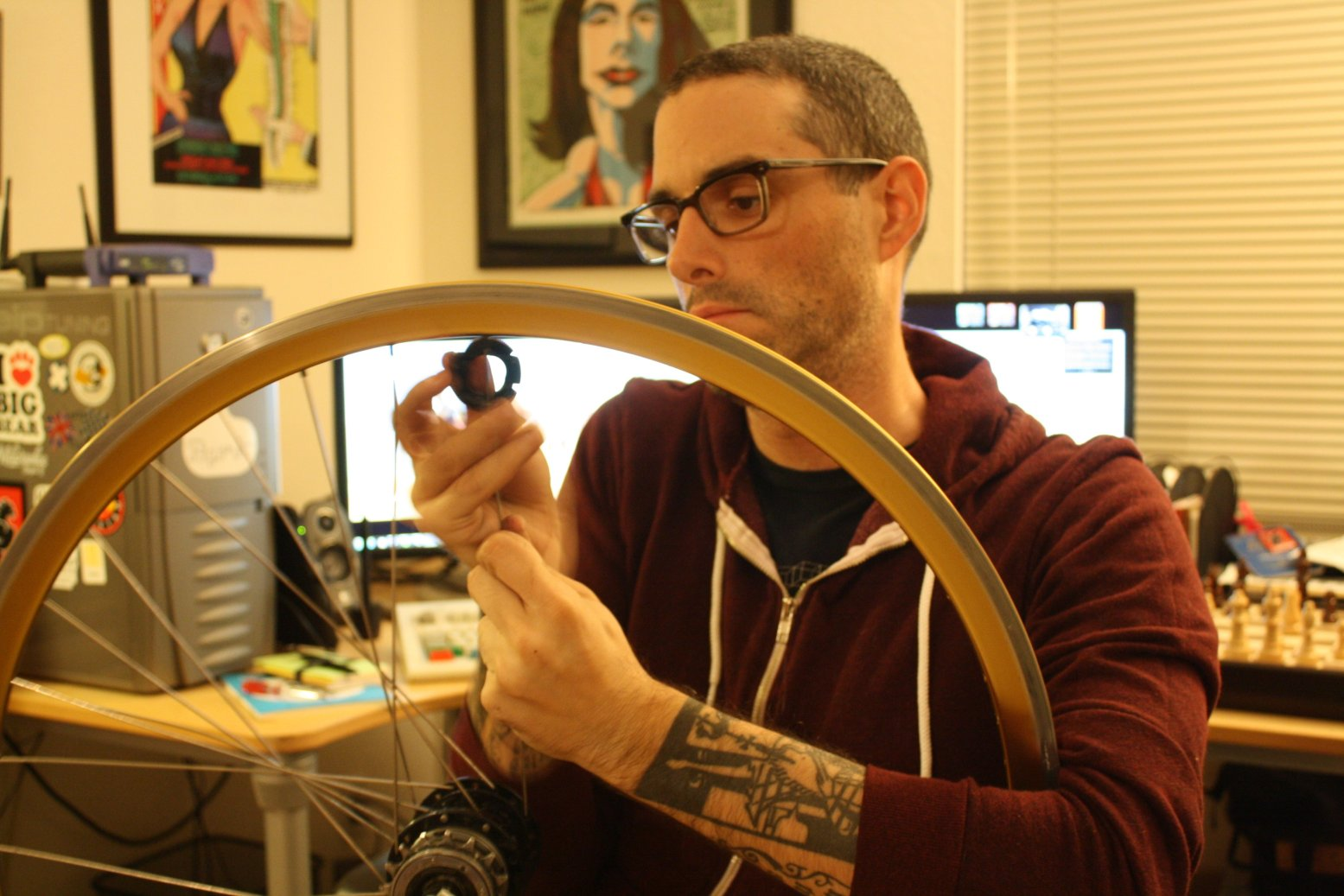
The director for The White March was Josh Sawyer, who previously directed the original Pillars of Eternity.

Plans for an expansion pack were already announced more than a week before Pillars of Eternity was released, with the developers noting that it would be with around the same area size as the Baldur's Gate expansion, Tales of the Sword Coast. Obsidian's CEO, Feargus Urquhart, later said that it would be released in two parts. He also mentioned that they wanted it to be an expansion in the vein of Baldur's Gate's and Icewind Dale's, saying that they wanted the expansion to be "meaty" and have "hours and hours of gameplay".

The snow-covered setting of the expansion is said to take inspiration from Black Isle Studios' Icewind Dale, with the developers at Obsidian saying they wanted a brand new setting to accompany the increase in difficulty. Improvements to gameplay include the addition of multi-class talents, which makes players able to learn abilities which were previously restricted to a certain other class, the ability to have only a single character enter stealth mode, and increased player control during scripted story encounters. Due to player feedback, Obsidian also added an artificial intelligence system for party members. There have also been tweaks to the user interface.

Directed by Josh Sawyer, the two-part The White March was announced and presented at Electronic Entertainment Expo 2015, and a trailer for the first part was later released. Part I was later released on August 25, 2015 for Microsoft Windows, OS X, and Linux. Part II was initially set to be released in January 2016, but the date was later moved to February 16, 2016. A launch trailer for it was released by Obsidian at the same date.

== Reception ==
Part I

Aggregate score
Aggregator	Score
Metacritic	76/100

Review scores
Publication	Score
GameSpot	6/10
IGN	6.8/10
PC Gamer (US)	70/100
GameStar	86/100

=== Part I ===
The White March – Part I received generally favorable reviews. On Metacritic, it has a score of 76 out of 100. The expansion received praise mainly for expanding on the base game with more content and having more challenging battles; however, it received criticism for its excessive focus on combat and general similarity to the original game.

The expansion's graphics received praise from PC Gamer, who said that the snowy environments of the game provided the expansion with a distinct art style compared to the green forests of Pillars of Eternity. GameSpot compared The White March to Icewind Dale, saying that they had similar cold, mountainous environments and a heavy focus on combat. The new artificial intelligence system for party members and enemies received praise from GameStar. Similarly, IGN positively noted the new AI system, writing that it will satisfy players who were unhappy with the system in the original Pillars of Eternity. IGN also said that combat, like in Icewind Dale, has a greater prominence in The White March – Part I than in the base game, writing that while they are of high quality, they lack part of the inspiration present in Icewind Dale. GameSpot commended the combat in the expansion, saying it is demanding and strategic.

PC World criticized the lack of interesting quests and described the content as "low-reward dungeon crawl padded with some filler quests", with the reviewer faulting this to the small scope of the expansion. A PC Gamer reviewer considered the story inferior to that of the main game, lacking in focus. Similarly, an IGN review called it too simple, while GameSpot said the expansion is "too predictable". The latter wrote that a few of the new adventures are fascinating, and positively noted the expansion's "emotionally-charged script". IGN wrote that the companions introduced in Part I, while interesting, weren't as good as the ones in the original game, and that their dialogue was predictable.

=== Part II ===
Part II

Aggregate score
Aggregator	Score
Metacritic	79/100

Review scores
Publication	Score
GameSpot	5/10
IGN	8/10
The Escapist	4/5
PC World	4/5
Softpedia	8.5/10

The White March – Part II was generally received more favorably by critics; it has a score of 79 out of 100 on Metacritic, indicating "generally favorable reviews". IGN praised the expansion, writing that it is more enjoyable than its previous first part, while also saying it cements Pillars of Eternity's status as among the most memorable role-playing games in recent times. The Escapist also commended the story and the importance of the choices players can make in the game. Softpedia thought many players were slightly disappointed with the first half of the expansion, but further said the second part was an improvement, praising the impressive story and gameplay moments.

The story of the expansion was well received. PC World considered the expansion's climax satisfying and "as good as anything in the main Pillars of Eternity storyline". GameSpot also wrote that the expansion's conclusion was "epic". The Escapist echoed this statement, noting that the scope of the expansion was impressive and that the story was almost as impactful as that of the base game, with the writer saying he felt he had almost the same impact on the world of Eora as in the final conversation with the base game's main antagonist. Softpedia agreed, saying the way the player deals with the major threat has great consequences for the world of Eora. IGN wrote that the expansion's quest line was engaging and that the new settings were memorable; however, the reviewer felt the main quest was too focused to the point of almost being too linear. The new companion, Maneha, was praised by Softpedia, who wrote that she was "tightly integrated into the story", and further recommended keeping her in the party for the expansion's main quest and for her personal side quest. Similarly, IGN's reviewer said he enjoyed Maneha's quest, finding it to be "one of the more engaging ones Pillars [of Eternity] has offered so far". However, PC World thought that her quest, along with the quests for the companions in Part I, weren't fleshed out enough before their conclusions.

Softpedia noted that there are many situations where players can talk their way out of combat, while also giving praise the combat itself, saying the increased level cap and the strong new equipment make battles entertaining; however, the reviewer also wrote that the difficulty will make players pause the game more often. IGN said that The White March – Part II has diverse battle encounters, while also praising the new Story Time difficulty mode, which the reviewer says makes the powerful enemies easier to defeat. In comparison, The Escapist criticized the game's combat, saying it persists as a weak element of Pillars of Eternity. The writer condemned the game for making some enemies too hard, and found the number of different spells confusing. GameSpot heavily criticized the expansion's battles, with the reviewer saying that the combat encounters were tedious. The writer also thought that the amount of combat is excessive, saying the second expansion makes the player face too many enemies. He further said that by the time players finish the expansion, they "will probably be ready to say farewell to Pillars of Eternity".

== See also ==
- List of Paradox Interactive games
- List of PC games
