= Pillars of Eternity =

2015 video game

- Developer: Obsidian Entertainment
- Publishers: Paradox Interactive; Versus Evil (Switch)
- Director: Josh Sawyer
- Producers: Adam Brennecke; Brandon Adler
- Designers: Josh Sawyer; Bobby Null; Eric Fenstermaker
- Programmer: Adam Brennecke
- Artist: Rob Nesler
- Writers: Eric Fenstermaker; Carrie Patel; Olivia Veras
- Composer: Justin E. Bell
- Engine: Unity
- Platforms: Windows; OS X; Linux; PlayStation 4; Xbox One; Nintendo Switch
- Release: Windows, OS X, Linux; March 26, 2015; PlayStation 4, Xbox One; August 29, 2017; Nintendo Switch; August 8, 2019
- Genre: Role-playing
- Mode: Single-player

Pillars of Eternity is a 2015 role-playing video game developed by Obsidian Entertainment and published by Paradox Interactive for Windows, OS X, and Linux. The game is a spiritual successor to the Baldur's Gate and Icewind Dale series, along with Planescape: Torment. Obsidian started a crowdfunding campaign on Kickstarter for it in September 2012, raising over US$4 million. The game uses the Unity engine.

The game takes place in the fantasy world of Eora, mainly inside the nation of Dyrwood. The infants in the Dyrwood are plagued by a recent phenomenon in which they become "hollowborn" upon birth, meaning they are born with no soul. During the beginning of the game, the protagonist experiences an awakening of power due to a disastrous supernatural event, discovering they are a "Watcher": a person who can see past lives and interact with souls. The objective of the game is to find out what caused their awakening and how to solve the hollowborn problem.

Pillars of Eternity received generally positive reviews from critics, who praised the game for its world and immersive writing, along with the strategic combat, and also said that it is a worthy successor to the games it was inspired by. The game also won various awards and accolades, including best RPG of 2015. It had sold over 700,000 units by February 2016. A two-part expansion pack, The White March was released in August 2015 and February 2016, respectively. A sequel, Pillars of Eternity II: Deadfire, was released in May 2018. A game set in the same shared universe as the Pillars of Eternity games, Avowed, was announced in 2020 and released in 2025.

== Gameplay ==
An example of dialogue in the game, depicting the interface

Pillars of Eternity sees players assume the role of a character defined as a "Watcher" – a person able to see and interact with the souls of people, viewing the memories of those deceased or communing with those who linger – operating on role-playing mechanics that include party-based real-time-with-pause tactical gameplay. The game is played from a fixed isometric viewpoint consisting of 3D models against two-dimensional pre-rendered backdrops, in a similar vein as its spiritual predecessors – Baldur's Gate, Icewind Dale, and Planescape: Torment.

New games begin with players creating a character, with the choices they make on the character's race, background, stats, and class – except their appearance – impacting what choices can be made in dialogues with non-player characters (NPCs) or interactive objects. Each class of the eleven available – fighter, rogue, ranger, barbarian, monk, paladin, wizard, druid, priest, chanter, and cipher – benefits from certain prominent stats in the game, and features a set of abilities unique to them, which can be used in battles with hostile enemies and creatures: for example, the cipher can use the soul of an enemy in order to attack them, and druids can shapeshift into a beast and cast spells. In addition to these, the character may make use of five skills – Stealth, Athletics, Lore, Mechanics and Survival – which confer bonuses in various situations, such as unlocking containers and gaining bonuses when resting outside inns. The character classes and game mechanics are similar to Dungeons & Dragons, but are a proprietary system created for the game. Characters level up upon acquiring experience points from completing quests and certain situations – battling enemies does not reward experience, meaning conducting non-violent approaches can be just as rewarding.

Exploration of the game world involves visiting locations as they become unlocked, with some only accessible after progressing the main story whereupon players can freely explore the location to find enemies, items, and objectives for quests they are on. Most locations feature a fog of war effect, a dark, black one for regions not explored, and a lighter effect for areas that have already been explored and have been moved away from. Alongside the main story quests of the game, players can engage in optional side quests which feature fleshed out supporting characters and multiple outcomes, most of which are not typical "fetch quests" in role-playing video games. To assist in their adventures, players can create a party of up to six characters with the help of both companions – characters found in certain locations, each with their own personal story and quest, and unique personalities and appearances, who will join when they offer assistance, of which the player can recruit up to eight to make a party from – and player-created characters – these can be made at inns, for a fee based on the level the player wishes their creation to be at.

During the course of the game, the player will build up a reputation with various factions, depending on the decisions they make in conversations and with resolving quests. This system effective denotes how NPCs of that faction will react to them and how traders will treat them when buying items. In addition, such choices will also impact the outcome of events when the game is completed. Players can enter scouting mode with certain characters or the whole party, which, impacted by a character's skill in Stealth, allows them to sneak around enemies as well as spot hidden items and traps, the latter of which can be disarmed (per a character's Mechanics skill) and be later used against enemies. After making some progress in the game's main story, the protagonist will take over a stronghold, which acts as a base where players can improve it with new buildings.

Battles in Pillars of Eternity focus on a system in which each enemy in the game has a set of different defensive stats. Alongside a general defence bonus, they have different resistances to certain weapon types and element types, which impacts how much damage they take, as well as certain status resistances that impact the effect of spells and abilities. Thus, players will find it useful to sometimes equip characters with different weapon types and use different spells to take advantage of enemies with weaker defences against certain types. For example, an enemy who can resist harm from piercing weapons would be better attacked with a different weapon type. A bestiary is provided which records information on creatures and enemies encountered, and adds more information the more they are encountered, effectively allowing players to see their stats during combat and determine how best to combat them. When an enemy attacks and damages a character, it impacts both their endurance and health: while characters will be knocked out when they are drained of all their endurance, which regenerates after combat is over (to a certain level based on damage to health), being drained of all their health effectively causes them to die permanently. To recover lost health and endurance, as well as certain abilities, players can either rest by setting up a camp or buying a room at an inn.

== Story ==
=== Setting ===
The story takes place in the world of Eora, in a region placed in the southern hemisphere called the Eastern Reach, an area roughly the size of Spain. The Eastern Reach contains several nations, including the Free Palatinate of Dyrwood, a former colony of the mighty Aedyr Empire that won its independence through a revolutionary war; the Vailian Republics, a confederation of sovereign city-states; and the Penitential Regency of Readceras, a quasi-theocratic state ruled by priests of the god Eothas.

Technologically and socially, most of the civilizations in Eora are in what roughly corresponds to the early stages of the early modern period. Firearms are a relatively new invention and are cumbersome to use; as a result, their use is not widespread. They have, however, proven quite effective against magic users.

A factor of great conflict all over Eora is the recent scientific discovery that souls are real and can be transferred, stored, or molded. Souls are the basis of magic, as accessing their power is what allows certain people to use it. Souls leave the body upon death, and go through a largely unknown process before reincarnating into a newborn body. Every soul does, however, have embedded memories from their previous lives, and through certain processes a person's soul can be "Awakened", meaning they gain awareness of these past lives. There are people in the world who have the supernatural ability to perceive people's souls, which allows them to access memories, among other things; these individuals are called "Watchers". Though the study of souls, called animancy, is a young field of science, the implications for society at large has been vast, led to rapid advances in technology, and caused several rifts and clashes in the different religious communities, which has marked the era as a time of great turmoil.

=== Characters ===
The player character can be male or female and one of six available races, and the game typically refers to them as "The Watcher". Over the course of the adventure, the player can recruit up to eight secondary characters as companions. Available companions include: Edér, a fighter and worshiper of one of the god Eothas; Aloth, a wizard and child of parents who served nobility; Durance, a disillusioned priest and follower of Magran, a goddess of war and fire; Sagani, a ranger who is on a quest to search for an elder from her village; Grieving Mother, a strange cipher who cannot normally be fully seen by other people, and has a personal connection to the hollowborn problem; Pallegina, a paladin who works for the Vailian Republics; Kana Rua, a chanter who was sent by his people to recover a book of sacred text; and Hiravias, a druid who has been banished from his tribe.

=== Plot ===
The player character is a foreigner who arrives in the Dyrwood. Their caravan is hit by a mysterious storm that kills everyone but them. Taking refuge in a cave, the player character witnesses some cultists perform a ritual on a machine that can strip souls from their bodies. Exposed to these energies, the player character becomes a Watcher, a person able to read souls. The player character also becomes Awakened, able to access memories of their past lives. This curses the Watcher with waking visions and an inability to sleep. In time, the Watcher will go insane from this, so they must track down the cultists and reverse the curse.

Dyrwood is cursed by the Hollowborn Plague: children are being born without souls, leaving them totally unresponsive, in a way similar to a permanent vegetative state. Many people blame animancers, the scientists who study and manipulate souls. Investigating the curse, the Watcher discovers that the Hollowborns' souls have in fact been stolen by a cult known as the Leaden Key, led by a priest named Thaos, and that Thaos is framing animancers for the Plague. This eventually leads to a riot in the capital city where animancers are lynched and their college is destroyed.

The Watcher and their companions pursue Thaos to the city of Twin Elms, where they learn the truth behind Thaos' actions. The gods of Eora are synthetic beings created by an ancient civilization known as the Engwithans. The Engwithans were master animancers, and through their science they discovered that the world of Eora had no real gods. This created an existential crisis for the Engwithans. The world of Eora was plagued by religious conflict, and the Engwithans had hoped to end these by discovering who were the true gods. Furthermore, most societies used gods to validate their moral systems, and the Engwithans feared that if others discovered that there were no real gods, this would cause amoral behavior to worsen. So the Engwithans decided to create some artificial gods by fusing their own souls into magical constructs. These constructs presented themselves to the mortals of Eora as the true gods of the Universe. The people of Eora were united in worship of a common pantheon, ending centuries of religious conflict and promoting the spread of civilization. Thaos is an Engwithan animancer who has survived the centuries by transferring his soul from one body to the next. His life mission is to ensure that nobody discovers the truth about the Engwithans' artificial gods, otherwise people might question their legitimacy. Part of this mission involves suppressing the science of animancy, because animancers might discover the truth through their science just as the Engwithans did. Thaos stole the souls of the Hollowborn to empower the goddess Woedica, who hates animancy and would see it destroyed.

Though the other gods have an interest in protecting their secret, they do not want Woedica to dominate them, and so they help the Watcher breach the defenses of Thaos' lair. The Watcher slays Thaos in his lair. The player must decide what to do with all the souls Thaos abducted: return them to their original bodies, let them reincarnate in new bodies, or feed them to Woedica. Other choices the player made throughout the game will affect the epilogue.

== Development ==
Pillars of Eternity concept art published during the Kickstarter campaign

Pillars of Eternity was developed by Obsidian Entertainment and published by Paradox Interactive. The game uses a game engine developed in Unity specifically for Pillars of Eternity. The game was directed by Josh Sawyer. There were multiple competing pitches for Pillars of Eternity's storyline within the studio, and the one worked on by Eric Fenstermaker and George Ziets ultimately won, after which Fenstermaker, who previously worked as a writer on the company's Fallout: New Vegas, was designated the game's lead narrative designer. Also involved in production were Adam Brennecke, Chris Avellone and Tim Cain. The audio director of Pillars of Eternity was Justin Bell, who also composed the game's score. Bell stated he was inspired by the music of Baldur's Gate and Icewind Dale when composing the game's music.

On September 10, 2012, Obsidian's webpage began teasing about a new game (entitled "Project X"), it initially was a number 4 encircled by an Ouroboros. The next day it was revealed to be a countdown. On September 14, 2012, the Kickstarter campaign went live revealing further details of the project. It completed its 1.1 million dollars objective in just over 24 hours, and the first set of "stretch goals" were announced. Pillars of Eternity surpassed the $1.6 million mark five days after the fund-raising began. It was announced an OS X version of the game would be provided together with a digital rights management-free option through GOG.com. A Linux version was announced on September 21, 2012. It passed the $2 million mark on September 26, 2012. On October 8, 2012, it was announced that Wasteland 2 would be offered to backers who pledged US$165 (and above). In the last day of the campaign, Pillars of Eternity surpassed Double Fine Adventure as Kickstarter's most-funded videogame at the time.

The project was part of a broader trend during the early 2010s of veteran game developers using nostalgia-driven crowdfunding campaigns to fund development in genres considered too obsolete or niche for major publishers. Feargus Urquhart, Obsidian's CEO, explained why they chose to use a crowdfunding model for Pillars of Eternity instead of the traditional developer and publisher arrangement: "What Kickstarter does is let us make a game that is absolutely reminiscent of those great games, since trying to get that funded through a traditional publisher would be next to impossible." In an interview, Josh Sawyer said that being free of the limitations of a publisher would enable them to "delve into more mature subject matter[...] slavery, hostile prejudice (racial, cultural, spiritual, sexual), drug use and trade, and so on will all help flesh out the story". Obsidian was said to be inspired by InXile Entertainment's success of using Kickstarter to fund Wasteland 2. Chris Avellone said during the project's announcement that if the campaign were to succeed, Pillars of Eternity would become a franchise. He ruled out a possible console port of the game, saying, "Those [console] limitations affect [role-playing game] mechanics and content more than players may realize (especially for players who've never played a PC [role-playing game] and realize what's been lost over the years), and often doesn't add to the [role-playing game] experience." Nevertheless, the game was successfully ported to consoles later. Additionally, he pledged to write a novella set in the game world. Four novellas were later made available on the company's website.

On October 16, 2012, Pillars of Eternity's Kickstarter funding campaign concluded with a total of $3,986,929, becoming the most highly funded video game on the Kickstarter platform at the time. Together with further funds collected via PayPal, its budget rose to $4,163,208. In December 2013, Obsidian announced that the official title for the game would be Pillars of Eternity, dropping the working title Project Eternity. They launched a poll asking backers whether or not they would support further fundraising.

In March 2014, it was announced that Paradox Interactive would publish the game. It was stated that Paradox's role would be taking care of marketing and distribution of the game, while Obsidian would still retain the rights to the intellectual property. On March 11, 2015, a preview video of the documentary series titled Road to Eternity, was released. It has been revealed that the money Obsidian Entertainment raised for the game through its Kickstarter campaign saved it from closure, as it had been suffering from financial problems following its cancellation of a game for "next-generational consoles" in 2012.

On February 8, 2021, the Nintendo Switch port was abandoned by the publisher. A statement said they would have to "leave issues present" due to the "limitations of the hardware we are working with".

In 2023, Sawyer felt that both Pillars of Eternity games were his most compromised works due to crowdfunding backers' demands for conservative game design instead of implementing his new ideas.

== Release ==
On March 17, 2015, Obsidian confirmed that Pillars of Eternity went gold, indicating it was being prepared for production and release. The game was released for Windows, OS X, and Linux on March 26, 2015. Several editions of the game were released, including a Champion Edition which has a campaign almanac, a map of the game, the soundtrack of the game, wallpapers, and ringtones; and a Royal Edition which includes the Champion Edition items along with a strategy guide, concept art, and a novella which was written by Chris Avellone. PlayStation 4 and Xbox One versions of the game were released on August 29, 2017, with the title Pillars of Eternity: Complete Edition. Ported by Paradox Arctic, it contains the updated game and both parts of the expansion pack. A version for the Nintendo Switch was released on August 8, 2019, following a prior announcement.

=== Expansion pack ===
A two-part expansion, Pillars of Eternity: The White March, was announced by Obsidian at Electronic Entertainment Expo 2015. Part I was released on August 25, 2015, and Part II was released on February 16, 2016. It extended the game, raised the level cap, and added new party members and abilities. Part I and II hold a score of 76% and 79% on Metacritic respectively, indicating "generally favorable reviews".

== Reception ==
Reception

Aggregate score
Aggregator	Score
Metacritic	PC: 89/100; PS4: 85/100; XONE: 86/100; NS: 82/100

Review scores
Publication	Score
Destructoid	8.5/10
Game Informer	9.25/10
GameRevolution	4.5/5
IGN	9/10
PC Gamer (US)	92/100
The Escapist	5/5

Pillars of Eternity received "generally favorable" reviews from critics, according to review aggregator website Metacritic.

The Escapist wrote that while it caters to a nostalgic fan base, it is an "excellent" role-playing game on its own merit, and also said that it is the best isometric role-playing game to come out "in years". PC Gamer said that Obsidian made their best game thus far with Pillars of Eternity, and wrote that it is a worthy successor to the games it was inspired by. IGN praised the game, saying that it is a representation of what is good about old school role-playing games. Digital Spy lauded Pillars of Eternity, writing that it is a "masterclass in role-playing game development."

Game Revolution said that Pillars of Eternity's combat is "deep and engaging"; similarly, Metro wrote that the combat is "highly complex". GameSpot said that the combat is the game's best component, and gave praise to the battle music. Gameplanet praised the game for its strategic combat and level-based progression. Game Informer noted the combat's customizability in the game, including the ability to change the difficulty and set options for auto-pausing. However, the review criticized the pathfinding in the game.

Pillars of Eternity's graphics and artwork were well received. Gameplanet called the art design in the game "excellent". Game Informer said that the game's maps are "thoughtfully crafted", and that the detail on the characters and their equipment is "incredible". Metro noted the game's higher resolution than older isometric games such as Baldur's Gate, saying that it benefits its "gorgeous" artwork. The review also praised the game's lighting and particle effects. The Escapist said that the spell effects in the game are "quite visually impressive" and that the character models are an improvement from traditional isometric games; however, the reviewer said that the backgrounds are not as impressive as "some of the more picturesque older titles". IGN criticized the game's art style, calling it "dated". Gameplanet found the game's voice acting to be "excellent" and free of over-acting. Game Informer echoed this statement, and also wrote that the game's sound and music is "delicate and beautiful".

GameSpot called Pillars of Eternity's writing "lovely". Particular praise was given by the reviewer to the character of the Grieving Mother, whose personal story he said was intriguing and "mysterious". PC Gamer also praised the writing, saying that it is "rich" and "evocative". Destructoid praised the plot and the world's reactivity to the player, writing, "the main plot is packed with twists and surprises with staggering ramifications for a world players will feel they have become part of." An IGN reviewer found characters in the game, both major and minor, to have well-developed characterization, but found it annoying that only some characters have voice acting. Eurogamer criticized the game for lack of humor compared with Baldur's Gate and Morte from Planescape: Torment, called the quests as "fairly stock" and the characters "forgettable".

=== Sales ===
In October 2015, Obsidian and Paradox confirmed that the game had sold over 500,000 units. By February 2016, it had sold over 700,000 units.

=== Awards ===
List of awards and nominations
Award	Category	Result	Ref.
Global Game Awards	Game of the Year	Nominated	
Global Game Awards	Best PC Exclusive	Nominated	
Global Game Awards	Best RPG	Won	
Global Game Awards	Best Original Game	Nominated	
The Game Awards 2015	Best Role Playing Game	Nominated	
PC Gamer	Spirit of the PC Award	Won	
Rock, Paper, Shotgun	Best RPG	Won	
IGN	Game of the Year	Nominated	
IGN	PC Game of the Year	Nominated	
IGN	Best RPG	Nominated	
Writers Guild of America Awards	Outstanding Achievement in Videogame Writing	Nominated	
19th Annual D.I.C.E. Awards	Role-Playing/Massively Multiplayer Game of the Year	Nominated	

== Sequel ==
A sequel to Pillars of Eternity was confirmed by Obsidian in May 2016 along with possible plans to crowdfund the game. The campaign was launched on Fig on January 26, 2017, where it was officially announced as Pillars of Eternity II: Deadfire. It was released on May 8, 2018, for Windows, macOS, and Linux.
