= Baldur's Gate: Dark Alliance =

2001 video game

- North American PlayStation 2 cover art
- Developers: Snowblind Studios; Black Isle Studios (Note: Ported to GameCube by High Voltage Software. Game Boy Advance version developed by Magic Pockets. 2021 re-release ported by Square One Games.)
- Publishers: Interplay Entertainment; Black Isle Studios (Note: Game Boy Advance port published by Destination Software.)
- Producer: Darren Monahan
- Designers: Chris Avellone; Ezra Dreisbach; Ryan Geithman
- Programmer: Ezra Dreisbach
- Artist: John Van Deusen
- Composers: Jeremy Soule; Will Loconto
- Series: Baldur's Gate
- Engine: Dark Alliance engine
- Platforms: PlayStation 2: Xbox; GameCube; Game Boy Advance; Windows; macOS; iOS; Linux; PlayStation 4; Nintendo Switch; Xbox One; Android
- Release: December 4, 2001: PlayStation 2; NA: December 4, 2001; EU: December 14, 2001; Xbox; NA: October 22, 2002; EU: March 21, 2003; GameCube; NA: November 20, 2002; EU: April 25, 2003; Game Boy Advance; WW: February 10, 2004; PlayStation 4 and Xbox One; WW: May 7, 2021 Nintendo Switch; WW: May 20, 2021; Microsoft Windows, macOS, and Linux; WW: December 17, 2021 iOS and Android; WW: April 7, 2023
- Genres: Action role-playing, hack and slash
- Modes: Single-player, multiplayer

Baldur's Gate: Dark Alliance is a 2001 action role-playing video game developed by Snowblind Studios and published by Interplay Entertainment subsidiary Black Isle Studios for the PlayStation 2 and the Xbox consoles, with High Voltage Software handling the GameCube port and Magic Pockets developing the Game Boy Advance version. CD Projekt was developing a version for Microsoft Windows, which was ultimately cancelled.

The game is set in the Forgotten Realms campaign setting of Dungeons & Dragons, and the gameplay is based on the rules of Dungeons & Dragons 3rd Edition, which were released in 2000. It is the first video game to implement the real time application of the new rules. It is also the first game in the Baldur's Gate series released on consoles as opposed to just PC and Mac.

Dark Alliance was well received on all four platforms, with the PlayStation 2 version going on to win the Academy of Interactive Arts & Sciences award for "Console Role-Playing Game of the Year" (2002). A sequel, Baldur's Gate: Dark Alliance II, was released in 2004 for non-Nintendo consoles. A third game was planned, but was cancelled early in development due to legal problems, and the closure of Black Isle Studios after Interplay went bankrupt. In 2021, a 4K port of Dark Alliance was released for the PlayStation 4, Xbox One, Nintendo Switch, and PC, and in 2023, ports for iOS and Android mobile devices were released.

== Gameplay ==
Gameplay in the PlayStation 2 version of Dark Alliance, showing Vahn fighting his way through the Marsh of Chelimber. His health and mana meters are at the top left of the screen. The empty meter between them is his experience meter.

Baldur's Gate: Dark Alliance is a real-time hack and slash/action role-playing game presented in a 3D perspective, with a rotatable isometric three-quarter top-down view.

At the beginning of the game, character stats are preset, with the player able to choose from three race/class combinations; a dwarven fighter (Kromlech), a human archer (Vahn) or an elven sorceress (Adrianna). The player can customize their character's stats through gaining experience points from defeating enemies. Every time the character increases in level, points are awarded corresponding to their previous level; i.e. if a character increases to level twelve, the player will gain eleven experience points to spend on the character's spells and feats. For every four levels which the character increases, the player is given one ability point to spend on one of the six core attributes (strength, intelligence, wisdom, dexterity, constitution, charisma).

Each of the three characters have their own unique fighting style and their own specific set of spells and feats. Gameplay strategy is thus different for each character. As Kromlech is a fighter, his spells and feats tend to focus on increasing his brute strength and ability to resist damage, as well as granting him powerful abilities to aid in melee combat, such as the ability to swing his weapon in a circle or slam it into the ground to damage groups of nearby enemies. As Vahn relies on ranged attacks, his spells and feats tend to focus on increasing the power of his bow and granting him the ability to fire special types of arrows, such as exploding arrows, ice arrows or multiple arrows. As Adrianna is a sorceress, her spells and feats tend to focus on increasing the power of her magic and granting her numerous new spells, such as the ability to shoot ice or fire from her fingers, shoot a ball of lightning or call down meteors on her enemies.

Gameplay is linear, and each main quest must be completed in sequence before the story can proceed, although there are some optional side-quests, which do not have to be completed immediately, but all side-quests must be completed within the act in which they are assigned. There are relatively few NPCs in the game, with whom only those who are part of a quest or side-quest may be interacted. Weapons, armor and items are only available for purchase from one location at a time, and become increasingly expensive and more powerful as the game progresses. The HUD features the option to use either a transparent map that covers most of the screen, or a mini-map, with the player also given the option to turn the map off entirely.

The game also features cooperative gameplay with another player. Both players share the same screen, and are thus limited in how far they can move away from one another. In co-op mode, the player who makes the kill gets 60% of the experience, and the other player gets 40%. Whichever player collects any gold drops gets 100% of the value, with the other player getting nothing.

The game contains four difficulty levels; "Easy", "Normal", "Hard" and "Extreme". Extreme can only be unlocked after the player has beaten "The Gauntlet", a special mini-dungeon unlocked once the player completes the game on any difficulty level. The Gauntlet can only be played with Drizzt Do'Urden. Extreme mode takes the form of a New Game Plus, and can only be played by importing a saved character from another game. Once the player has completed Extreme mode, Drizzt Do'Urden becomes available to use in the main game.

=== GBA version ===
The Game Boy Advance version of Dark Alliance features some noticeable gameplay differences from the console versions, while still generally following the same storyline as the other versions. Character creation is more limited, with a human male playable, though the player still has the choice of playing as a Fighter, Wizard, or Archer. After completing the game, a fourth class, Elven Fighter, becomes available on further playthroughs. There is no option to retain a character upon completing the game and play through the story again, the player must begin again with a new character. The game is also limited in more technical areas; there is no multiplayer or co-operative mode, forcing the player to complete the game alone. You cannot jump, there are no recall potions, which are utilized in the home console ports to teleport back to a town to sell wares, before going back to the dungeon.

On the other hand, the game has been expanded in ways not present in the console versions. The town of Baldur's Gate is far more interactive, with the ability to talk to NPCs, enter houses and use weapons to open breakable objects, such as barrels. There are additional side quests, and the game can be saved at any point, giving the player flexibility to pause their game at any moment.

== Plot ==
=== Setting ===
The game takes place in the Sword Coast and the Western Heartlands, areas in the Faerûn continent of the Forgotten Realms. Each act of the game takes place in a different region: Act I takes place in the city of Baldur's Gate itself; Act II in the Sunset Mountains; and Act III in the Marsh of Chelimber.

=== Story ===
The game begins with Vahn, Adrianna and Kromlech arriving in Baldur's Gate, whereupon they are attacked by a group of thieves led by Karne (Michael Bell). The city watch save the trio and take them to the Elfsong Tavern to recover. There, the bartender, Alyth Elendara (Jennifer Hale), tasks them to clear the tavern's cellar of rats. In the cellar, they discover the thieves are using the tavern's sewer entrance to infiltrate the city. When Elfsong Tavern employee Ethon follows them into the sewers and disappears, they rescue him from thieves, and he directs them to the nearby crypts, where one of the thieves was headed. There, they encounter Fayed (Cam Clarke), a priest of Illmater, who requests their help in stopping the "Orb of the Undead", which has filled the crypts with zombies and skeletons. They destroy the orb and discover the thieves, collectively known as Xantam's Guild, placed it there. Ethon introduces them to Jherek (John Rhys-Davies), a member of the Harpers, a group dedicated to protecting the realms from evil. Impressed with the trio, he invites them to join the Harpers and destroy Xantham's Guild.

After navigating a gauntlet of traps in the sewers, they face and kill Karne; they then find the guild master, the beholder Xantam (Tony Jay). They fight and kill him, and Jherek asks them to enter a portal which Xantam was guarding. The portal transports them to the Sunset Mountains, whereupon they head to a dwarf mining village, which is oppressed by drow elves. They light a signal fire atop a nearby mountain, calling for aid from neighboring dwarven clans, and enter the mines to rout the drow. After killing the drow priestess, they rescue a dwarven Harper, who tells them of another portal in the mountains. He also tells them that troops and monsters are planning to use the portals to move from the mountains into Baldur's Gate, attacking the city from within. The adventurers head to the portal, which is guarded by the ice dragon Ciraxis. They slay him and pass through the portal into the Marsh of Chelimber.

There, they meet Sleyvas (Kevin Michael Richardson), one of the native lizardfolk. He tells them of the nearby "Onyx Tower", and of its inhabitant, Eldrith the Betrayer (Vanessa Marshall), who has sworn vengeance against Baldur's Gate. He reveals that his kin, led by the lizard Sess'sth, are serving Eldrith. The trio kill Sess'sth, crippling the lizard army. Sleyvas leads them to the Onyx Tower, which they enter by taking a detour through the Elemental Plane of Water. Inside the tower, they witness Eldrith's preparations for war and fight their way upwards, through legions of Eldrith's soldiers.

At the penultimate level of the tower, they meet the ghost of Keledon (Dwight Schultz), first captain of the company of the Westering Sun. He explains that Eldrith once served Baldur's Gate as its greatest general, fighting a crusade against the Black Horde. After defending the city, she defied orders and led her army in pursuit of the retreating Horde. Trapping them in a ravine, they proved stronger than she had anticipated, and she asked the city for re-enforcements, which never came. Eldrith survived, but her army was defeated, and, furious, she rallied her remaining soldiers to attack Baldur's Gate, but was again defeated. The city's soldiers pursued her and her men to the Marshes of Chelimber, and killed them all, but Eldrith's rage was such that she returned to life, creating the Onyx Tower, which gave her access to the portals. Seeking revenge, she orchestrated the attacks against Baldur's Gate, and created a dark alliance between Xantam's guild, the drow, and Sess'sth's tribes.

Keledon explains that if the trio defeat Eldrith, the Tower will be destroyed, and the ghosts within will be freed. However, as they cannot leave the tower, it will likely lead to their own deaths. They find Eldrith on the roof of the Tower guarding another portal. She reiterates her plans for the destruction of Baldur's Gate. They fight and defeat her, and as she dies, she repents her actions. With the tower crumbling, the heroes enter the portal, not knowing where it leads.

It is revealed that Sleyvas manipulated the heroes to defeat Eldrith for his unidentified master. He tells his master that the heroes have died within the tower and Eldrith is no longer an obstacle. As such, they can now proceed with their plans. Meanwhile, the trio emerge in an unknown forest, and are surrounded by dark creatures.

== Development ==
Dark Alliance was first revealed in November 2000, when Interplay confirmed to IGN that a PlayStation 2 game based on Baldur's Gate II had entered production, following the cancellation of the Sega Dreamcast port of the original Baldur's Gate. Little was known at that time other than the fact that Interplay would publish, and BioWare, developers of the original Baldur's Gate, would not develop the game. Instead, the game was to be developed by Snowblind Studios. The game was officially confirmed in February 2001.

Ryan Geithman, director of Snowblind, added:

We are developing the game from the ground up to take full advantage of the sophisticated PlayStation 2 technology. Our goal is to push the hardware to its limits thus creating stunning environmental effects and highly detailed characters never before seen on the console.

Interplay said that if the game was successful, a sequel would enter development immediately.

The game utilized a new game engine, the Dark Alliance Engine, which was built specifically for Dark Alliance, and would go on to become the foundation for other games on the PlayStation 2, such as Fallout: Brotherhood of Steel and The Bard's Tale. Graphically, the Dark Alliance engine is a major improvement over the engine used by the original PC Baldur's Gate games, the Infinity Engine. Infinity was only able to render 2D sprite characters and static environments. The Dark Alliance engine, on the other hand, made use of the PlayStation 2's advanced GPU, allowing for such improvements as dynamic lighting, real-time shadowing and 3D models of characters and environments.

In September, Interplay originally entered negotiations with Vivendi Universal Games for an exclusive North American distribution deal, with Dark Alliance being one of the first two titles. The game was finalised and was originally scheduled with a release date of November 12. The game was shipped by Black Isle Studios on December 3.

=== Ports ===
With the success of the PlayStation version, the Xbox port, also developed by Snowblind, was released on October 22, 2002. The GameCube version was ported by High Voltage Software and released on November 20 of the same year. The Game Boy Advance port was developed by Magic Pockets. The port was originally announced in November 2001, but little more was heard of the title until January 2004, when a rumor circulated that the game was finished, and was set to be published by Ubisoft. This proved inaccurate, with Destination Software ultimately publishing the title in February.

Believing the game could also be a success on the PC, Interplay's Feargus Urquhart and David Perry contacted Polish developers CD Projekt. As Poland was known for only developing PC games, Urquhart and Perry believed Projekt would be the perfect team to port Dark Alliance to PC. Sebastian Zieliński, developer of Mortyr 2093-1944, which Interplay had published, was placed in charge of the project, with Adam Badowski, a film storyboard artist, hired as designer. A PlayStation 2 development kit was smuggled from Interplay's offices in London to Poland, and work on the port began, but almost immediately, Interplay cancelled development.

A reissue of Dark Alliance for PlayStation 4 and Xbox One was released on May 7, 2021, with a Nintendo Switch version followed on May 20, and for Microsoft Windows, macOS and Linux (published on Steam and GOG.com) on December 17. The reissue supports some additional updates such as 4K resolution support on the newer consoles, but is otherwise not a remake of the original game.

== Reception ==
Reception

Aggregate score
| Aggregator | Score | | | |
| Aggregator | GBA | GameCube | PS2 | Xbox |
|---|---|---|---|---|
| Metacritic | 76/100 | 79/100 | 87/100 | 83/100 |

Review scores
| Publication | Score | | | |
| Publication | GBA | GameCube | PS2 | Xbox |
|---|---|---|---|---|
| GameSpot | 8/10 | 7.6/10 | 8.8/10 | 8.5/10 |
| GameSpy | | 3.5/5 | | 4/5 |
| IGN | 8/10 | 7.5/10 | 9.4/10 | 8.5/10 |
| Nintendo Power | 4/5 | 4.2/5 | | |
| Official U.S. PlayStation Magazine | | | 4.5/5 | |
| Official Xbox Magazine (US) | | | | 8.8/10 |

Award
| Publication | Award |
|---|---|
| Academy of Interactive Arts & Sciences | Console Role-Playing (2002) |

=== Pre-release ===
When the game was first shown at E3 in May 2001, it gained critical acclaim, with IGN writing that "it almost instantly became one of the most wanted games for PlayStation 2 owners across the country. The game's graphics are as good as anything else on the system. It's as simple as that. The lighting, shadows, textures, models, water effects, and reflections are all amazing to look at and are a testament to the power of PlayStation 2 and the skills of the developers over at Snowblind Studios". Commenting on E3 presentation, IGN wrote that "none of the problems that are commonly associated with PlayStation 2 games, such as low-res textures, flickering, or aliasing problems, are to be found here. It's hard to think of a game that pulls off the much-fabled anti-aliasing as well as this game does. Dark Alliance uses a technique similar to what a large number of Dreamcast games did to pull off their clean look: they simply render the scene at a much higher resolution, anti-alias it, then drop it down to a more acceptable resolution for TVs. The result is a beautifully anti-aliased game". IGN gave a full preview in November, again praising the graphics, and wrote: "This game is running on a rock-solid 3D engine with completely rotatable dungeons, brilliant animation for nearly every interactive element (of which there are many), and first-rate lighting effects of all different kinds [...] In the beginning, simple refined touches are impressive, amid the generally sharp atmosphere of the game (while there is no visible aliasing, the graphics aren't heavily filtered, either). Even when all you have to fight are rats, and all you have to fight with is a dagger, you can admire how barrels come apart when you smash them, in realistically shaded pieces and a puff of dust, or all the different limbs you can bloodily excise from your foes".

=== Post-release ===
Baldur's Gate: Dark Alliance was well received on all four platforms. Metacritic records all versions as receiving "generally favorable reviews", with the PlayStation 2 version holding an aggregate score of 87 out of 100, based on twenty-nine reviews; the Xbox version 83 out of 100, based on twenty-five reviews; the GameCube version 79 out of 100, based on ten reviews; and the Game Boy Advance version 76 out of 100, based on seventeen reviews.

IGN reviewed all four versions of the game. David Smith scored the PlayStation 2 version 9.4 out of 10, giving it an "Editor's Award" and calling the Dark Alliance engine "one of the best 3D engines yet devised". He dismissed criticisms of the game as a "Diablo clone", arguing the gameplay is much deeper than such a comparison suggests. His only criticisms were some anticlimactic boss fights and repetitive music. He called Dark Alliance one of the best titles for PS2. Kaiser Hwang scored the Xbox version 8.5 out of 10. He praised the graphics, but was critical that the Xbox version did not add anything new compared to PS2 version released a year earlier. Fran Mirabella III scored the GameCube version 7.5 out of 10, criticizing the game's frame rate and called it "a downgrade from the PS2 version". Craig Harris scored the Game Boy Advance version 8 out of 10, arguing that although it is missing a few key elements from the original version it's based upon, Baldur's Gate: Dark Alliance works very well in portable form.

GameSpot also reviewed all four versions. Gerald Villoria scored the PlayStation 2 version 8.8 out of 10, praising the differences between the fighting styles of the three characters, the controls, the range of enemies and weaponry, and the lip syncing. Greg Kasavin scored the Xbox version 8.5 out of 10, calling it "one of the finest action RPGs ever made" and lauding it as "a perfect port". Kasavin scored the GameCube version 7.6 out of 10, finding similar faults to IGN's Mirabella, also criticizing frame rate issues that are "nonexistent" in the PS2 and Xbox versions and concluded that "the game just wasn't optimized for the system". Frank Provo scored the Game Boy Advance version 8 out of 10, praising the enemy AI, the sound and the graphics, while lightly criticizing the game's generally short length and the concessions the developers had to make in porting the game to the Game Boy Advance.

GameSpy reviewed the Xbox and GameCube versions. Raymond Padilla scored the Xbox version 4 out of 5. Although he called it one of the best titles for Xbox, he was critical of the game having minor visual and aural enhancements in this version, and criticized the lack of Xbox Live compatibility or any kind of downloadable content, arguing that the improvements are only "superficial". Christian Nutt scored the GameCube version 3.5 out of 5, calling it "a wonderfully entertaining game" despite not living up to the technical quality of the PS2 or Xbox versions. He wrote that "the graphics have taken a subtle but damaging hit" and criticized the game's frame rate as "sluggish", but commended gameplay.

In the mainstream press, Victor Godinez of The Dallas Morning News called the game "a blast to play". Billy O'Keefe, of the Knight Ridder Tribune wrote Dark Alliance is "all about action", opining that a pure RPG would not work on a console, and the additional action elements in Dark Alliance improved playability. John Breeden II of The Washington Post praised "the smaller number of more straightforward quests". Bob Low of the Daily Record called the graphics "flawless". Godinez also lauded the graphics, calling them "breathtaking". Breeden agreed, saying that "the graphics on the PS2 version are eons ahead of the PC series". Low's one complaint was that the game was too short. Breeden echoed this sentiment, arguing that players used to the longer PC games in the series might find Dark Alliance too brief.

IGN ranked Baldur's Gate: Dark Alliance No. 7 on their list of "The Top 11 Dungeons & Dragons Games of All Time" in 2014.

=== Sales and awards ===
Baldur's Gate: Dark Alliance was a commercial success, selling over one million units across PlayStation 2, Xbox and GameCube. During the 5th Annual Interactive Achievement Awards (now known as the D.I.C.E. Awards), the Academy of Interactive Arts & Sciences awarded Dark Alliance with "Console Role-Playing Game of the Year". It was nominated for GameSpot's annual "Best In-Game Water" and "Best Role-Playing Game" prizes among console games, which went respectively to Wave Race: Blue Storm and Final Fantasy X. The 2002 GameCube version was a runner-up for GameSpot's annual "Best Music on GameCube" and "Best Role-Playing Game on GameCube" awards, while the Xbox port claimed nominations for "Best Music on Xbox", "Best Sound on Xbox" and "Best Role-Playing Game on Xbox". It was later listed at No. 66 in IGN's "Top 100 PlayStation 2 Games".
