= Armored Warfare =

2015 video game

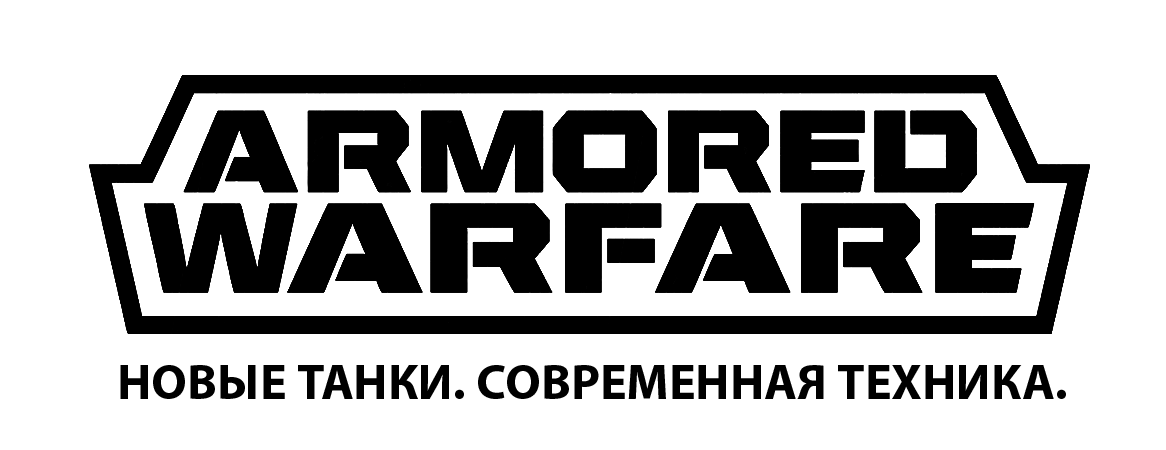
- Developers: Obsidian Entertainment (former); My.Games (former); Wishlist Games
- Publisher: Wishlist Games
- Engine: CryEngine
- Platforms: Microsoft Windows, PlayStation 4, Xbox One
- Release: Microsoft Windows; October 8, 2015; PlayStation 4; February 20, 2018; Xbox One; August 2, 2018
- Genre: Vehicular combat
- Modes: Multiplayer, Player versus Environment (AI)

Armored Warfare (sometimes referred to as AW) is a free-to-play vehicular combat video game developed by MY.Games and Obsidian Entertainment and published by Wishlist Games for Microsoft Windows. The game features combat vehicles from the 1950s through modern day and includes destructible environments as well as player vs. environment and player vs. player gameplay. The game was originally in development by Obsidian Entertainment, who worked on the game until being dropped in 2017.

Armored Warfare is built on the free-to-play business model with in-game micro-transactions available for certain features and upgrades. The game also has the option of signing up for premium account time, which allows bonuses to progression. Armored Warfare was launched into open beta in October 2015.

== Plot ==
In the late 2010s, Europe has suffered a severe economic and political crisis. When two dirty nuclear bombs are detonated outside the cities of Paris and Berlin, a revolution is started that forced the world into chaos. When the crisis ends, the largest of the corporations rise to power.

The story starts with the world in the late 2030s. Many hate the state of the world that it is now. Further, many have created or migrated into the "Badlands," areas where the corporations have no interest or are unable to control. The world is only growing more unstable, and it is only a question of time before the world is plunged into the chaos of war once more.

== Gameplay ==
Armored Warfare is set in a modern virtual world where the player takes on the role of a mercenary employed by a private military company. The game offers players the opportunity to participate in battles across co-op player versus environment campaigns and team-based player versus player matches in a variety of armored vehicles, main battle tanks, and long-range artillery. Players can customize their vehicles with upgrades and retrofits that affect the way the vehicles perform in-game.

=== Player versus player ===
In player versus player (PvP) gameplay, the players take control of an armored vehicle and participate in 15 vs. 15 team battles across 13 different maps. In order to secure the win, a team must either eliminate all the opponents in the enemy team or successfully capture the opponent's base (standard PvP mode) or the neutral base (encounter PvP mode). The duration of the battle for both 'Standard' and 'Encounter' modes is up to 15 minutes; nevertheless, time may be shorter if any of the aforementioned team goals have been achieved earlier.

=== Player versus environment ===
Player versus environment (PvE) missions are designed for a group of five players to fight against artificial intelligence (AI) controlled bots. Players can queue for missions individually or grouped with up to four other players in a platoon. Missions can be selected from several difficulty levels up to insane, where success depends on the vehicles the players bring, coordination between the team members and skill in the PvE arena.

=== Global Operations ===
Global Operations (also Global Ops or Glops) is the newest game mode, introduced in update 0.18. It features expanded, specially designed maps with special features not found in the other modes. At its core, it is a PvP mode but when dying, players can respawn. This, however, makes your team's ticket counter go down. The main objective of this mode is to get the enemy team's tickets to 0 before yours do. The main way of accomplishing this is by capturing objectives which dynamically change over time on the map. In addition to these primary objectives, there are also secondary objectives in the form of "wildcards". These range from a bomber strike that a player can call in, a UAV drone to spot the enemy, or even an AC-130 gunship.

=== Customization ===
Armored Warfare offers players a wide array of vehicle and base customization options. It is possible to unlock additional vehicles and equipment as players progress through the game as well as visually customize their vehicles with camouflage patterns and paints, as well as emblems on the side of vehicles.

=== Progression ===
Unlike other games such as War Thunder and World of Tanks, vehicles are not separated in a tech tree by countries, instead, they are separated by dealers, all who specialize in a specific advantage that their vehicles provide. For example, Sophie Wölfli, one of the dealers available, focuses on more of a passive/defensive posture, hence why she offers a variety of American and German main battle tanks, many of which are heavily armored, and very mobile, such as the M1 Abrams.

== Reception ==
=== Awards ===
The game received the "Best Multiplayer" award from TenTonHammer's Best of E3 Awards 2014.
