= Avowed =

2025 video game

- Developer: Obsidian Entertainment
- Publisher: Xbox Game Studios
- Director: Carrie Patel
- Programmers: Joey Betz; Daniel Spitzley
- Artist: Matt Hansen
- Writers: Kate Dollarhyde; Robert Lo
- Composer: Venus Theory
- Series: Pillars of Eternity
- Engine: Unreal Engine 5
- Platforms: Windows; Xbox Series X/S; PlayStation 5
- Release: Windows, Xbox Series X/S; February 18, 2025; PlayStation 5; February 17, 2026
- Genre: Action role-playing
- Mode: Single-player

Avowed is an action role-playing game developed by Obsidian Entertainment and published by Xbox Game Studios. The game is set in the world of Eora, the same universe as Pillars of Eternity. It was released for Windows and Xbox Series X/S on February 18, 2025, and for PlayStation 5 on February 17, 2026. The game received generally positive reviews from critics, but failed to meet the sales expectations of Xbox Game Studios.

== Gameplay ==
In the game, players can use both firearms and magic to defeat enemies.

Avowed is an action role-playing game that can be played from both first-person and third-person views. Players can use magic, melee weapons, and firearms to defeat enemies. A wide variety of spells—such as those that freeze or entangle foes—can be combined with physical attacks; for instance, freezing an enemy may set it up for a crushing melee strike. Players can quickly switch between several combat setups, including dual-wielding pistols or wands, wielding a two-handed axe, or using a sword or gun together with a shield. The game also features several skill trees for unlocking new abilities and permits individual weapon upgrades. Although not a fully open world game, Avowed includes several large, explorable zones.

As players explore the world, they will interact with various non-player characters (NPCs). Like in The Outer Worlds, dialogue choices allow players to shape their character's tone and influence relationships with companions—although romance is not an option. Decisions made throughout the game affect both the storyline and how companions assist in combat and questing.

== Plot ==
Avowed takes place in the Living Lands, a diverse region within the fantasy world of Eora. The Living Lands features a range of environments—from lush forests and arid deserts to sprawling caves and valleys. Players assume the role of an envoy from the Aedyr Empire, tasked with investigating a mysterious plague known as the "Dream Scourge". The Envoy arrives to the port city of Paradis, where representatives from the Aedyran Empire clash with the islands native inhabitants. The Envoy mediates between rebel groups, the Empire, and the Steel Garrote, a militant religious order that seeks to eliminate the chaos prevalent in the Living Lands. The Envoy is murdered by Paradis rebels and in death, meets a mysterious deity who revives the Envoy in exchange for their help in destroying the Dream Scourge. After their revival, they may decide to aid one of the factions vying for power in Paradis, or seek revenge for their murder in an effort to discover the source of the Dream Scourge.

Next, the Envoy travels to the Emerald Stair, a nearby region known for producing most of the food in the Living Lands using controversial soul-manipulating magic called Animancy. Here, the Envoy encounters the Living Lands' many intelligent non-human species, and the first ruins of a lost civilization known to colonial forces as the "Godless." The Envoy learns that the Godless called themselves the Ekida, and they had a connection to the mysterious deity that aids the Envoy and potentially the Dream Scourge. In doing so, they conflict with the Steel Garrote who consider both colonial and native inhabitants in need of rigid order, and eventually besiege the city in Emerald Stair. The Envoy decides whether to support the siege or repel it, both resulting in the evacuation of the city.

The siege coincides with in an increase in the ferocity of the Dream Scourge, so the Envoy proceeds to desert colony Shatterscarp to continue investigating the Ekida. There, the Envoy encounters more conflicts between inhabitants who colonized the area a century prior, and Empire and Steel Garrote forces. Many of the disparate civilizations in the Living Lands are a few hundred years old, and none have a connection to the Ekida or understand their history, proving a challenge for the Envoy. They investigate a major Ekida ruin and discover that the mysterious deity supporting the Envoy is a god named Sapadal, who has been isolated from the rest of the world and the Living Lands after a catastrophic event killed most of the Ekida. Sapadal is considered to be much younger than other gods in Eora, expressed in their propensity for intense emotion. The ruin is also discovered to be a source of monsters created by the Dream Scourge which oppress the nearby inhabitants, and the Envoy must choose whether to destroy the ancient structure or retain it and sacrifice an unknown quantity of the people of Shatterscarp at random.

The final civilization the Envoy encounters are the Pargrunen, resilient mountain dwarves who are the most established colony in the Living Lands. The Envoy mediates a central conflict between the Pargrunen, some of whom wish to continue their strict isolation and some who would open their gates to others. Further investigation of Ekida ruins reveal that Sapadal's temperamental nature was responsible for many disasters that killed Ekidan people, culminating in a disaster that wiped out all Ekida in the Living Lands. The stress of this discovery and the rising political turmoil in the Living Lands causes Sapadal to lash out, manifesting in tremors and a volcanic eruption that threatens the new inhabitants of the Living Lands. After deciding the fate of the Pargrunen's home, the Envoy seeks to find Sapadal and end the Dream Scourge, which has been worsening in tandem with the instability in the region. The patron deity of the Steel Garrote, Woedica, urges the player to destroy Sapadal and claims that their temperament has killed many and will continue to do so. The player may choose to destroy Sapadal or free them. After their decision, the player participates in the emerging power struggle for the control of the Living Lands, choosing to support the local civilizations, the Steel Garrote, or the Empire, with or without Sapadal's divine aid.

== Development ==
Obsidian Entertainment started development in 2018 as an online multiplayer game. At that time, Obsidian's leadership were preparing to sell the company and pitched Avowed—then framed as a mixture of Destiny (2014) and The Elder Scrolls V: Skyrim (2011)—to prospective buyers, with Microsoft's Xbox division purchasing the studio in November 2018. By January 2020, the studio had cut the multiplayer elements to focus on a single-player, narrative-focused experience, managed by Carrie Patel, director of The Outer Worlds: Peril on Gorgon. Obsidian and Xbox Game Studios announced Avowed with a teaser trailer at a showcase in July 2020.

The game's reveal concerned the 80-person development team, who were starting development again. Patel's leadership led to two major overhauls: utilize the setting of the Pillars of Eternity franchise and replace the open-world setting with zones. The game was revealed again in 2023 with a scheduled 2024 release, which was later delayed to February 18, 2025. A premium edition was sold, offering access from February 13. A PlayStation 5 version of the game was released on February 17, 2026.

== Possible sequel ==
A sequel to Avowed was reportedly in development in early 2026. Microsoft Gaming went through a major round of layoffs that July, amid a directive to focus on the company's core franchises. This led to a quarter of Obsidian being laid off, plans for the Avowed sequel to be scrapped, and for the remaining team to move to a Fallout project. The report indicated that a small group would still work on Avowed 2 in the hopes of reviving it in the future.

== Reception ==
=== Critical reception ===
Reception

Aggregate scores
Aggregator	Score
Metacritic	(PC) 77/100 (XSXS) 80/100 (PS5) 81/100
OpenCritic	83%

Review scores
Publication	Score
Digital Trends	4.5/5
Eurogamer	4/5
Game Informer	8.25/10
GameSpot	6/10
GamesRadar+	4/5
Hardcore Gamer	4/5
IGN	7/10
PC Gamer (US)	82/100
PCGamesN	6/10
Shacknews	9/10
The Guardian	3/5
Video Games Chronicle	4/5
VG247	5/5
VideoGamer.com	7/10

Avowed received "generally favorable" reviews from critics, according to review aggregator website Metacritic, and 83% of critics recommended the game according to OpenCritic.

The game was nominated for Best Role Playing Game at The Game Awards 2025, and Herman Melville Award for Best Writing in a Game at the 15th New York Game Awards.

=== Sales ===
In February 2026, it was revealed that Avowed had failed to meet the sales expectations of Xbox Game Studios.
