= Chris Avellone =

American video game designer

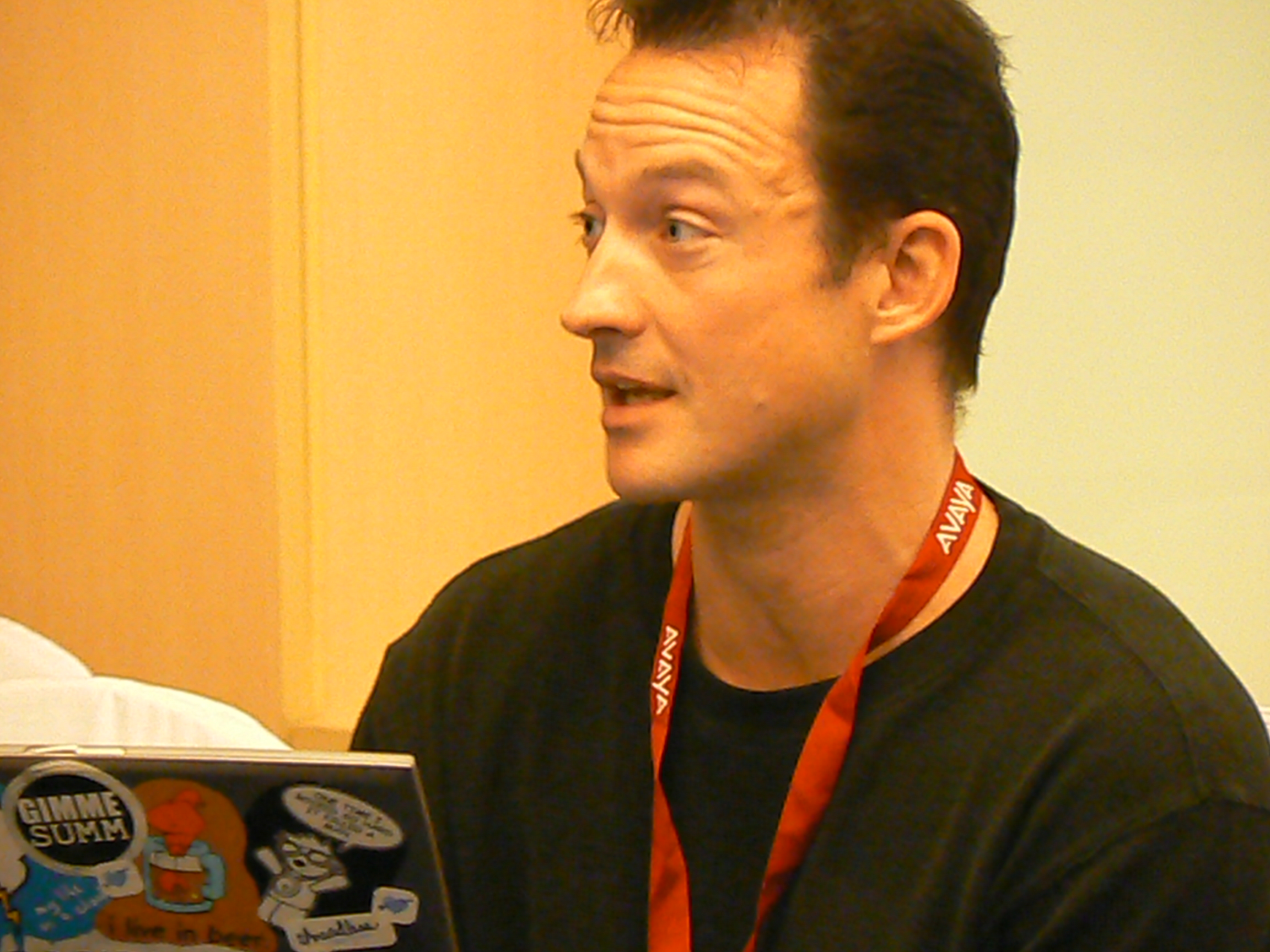
- Avellone in 2009
- Born: United States
- Known for: Writing and designing role-playing video games

Chris Avellone (/ˈævəloʊn/ AV-ə-lohn) is an American video game designer and comic book writer. He is known for his roles on a large number of video games, primarily role-playing video games, praised for their writing across his three-decade career.

Avellone joined Interplay in 1995 and was one of the designers of Fallout 2 (1998) and the lead designer of Planescape: Torment (1999), the latter of which has been regarded as "one of the best-written and most imaginative video games ever created". After departing Interplay in 2003, he became one of the co-founders and the chief creative officer of Obsidian Entertainment, where he was the lead designer of Star Wars Knights of the Old Republic II: The Sith Lords (2004) and a senior designer on Fallout: New Vegas (2010). From 2012 on, he was involved with some of the most successful crowdfunding campaigns on Kickstarter, becoming known as a "human stretch goal".

Avellone departed Obsidian in 2015 and has since worked as a freelancer for various companies on games such as Prey (2017), Divinity: Original Sin II (2017), Pathfinder: Kingmaker (2018), Star Wars Jedi: Fallen Order (2019) and Pathfinder: Wrath of the Righteous (2021).

In 2009, he was chosen by IGN as one of the top 100 game creators of all time and by Gamasutra as one of the top 20 game writers. In 2017, he was named by GamesTM as one of the then 50 most influential people in gaming.

== Early life ==
Avellone grew up in Alexandria, Virginia. At the age of 9, he first learned about Dungeons & Dragons while playing catch with a friend from the neighborhood who started describing a "strange game of make-believe where you could pretend to be a dwarf, elf, fighter and you could explore dungeons, fight monsters, and take their treasure." After trying to put together a group to play with, he realized that no one wanted to be the group's gamemaster and he had to learn how to fill the role himself, experiencing the game vicariously through the players and looking for new ways to entertain them.

He attended the Thomas Jefferson High School for Science and Technology in nearby Fairfax County. While in high school, he visited a friend's house and saw The Bard's Tale II: The Destiny Knight by Interplay Productions running on the Commodore 64, which made him realize a computer game master could also run a game for him and resulted in him playing every computer RPG he could get his hands on, without considering at the time that he could seek a career in computer games.

Upon finishing high school, he moved south and pursued a degree in architecture at Virginia Tech because he had enjoyed drawing maps and structures for his pen-and-paper gaming sessions. After two years, however, he realized his "sketchbook was often filled with more sentences than sketches", which made him question himself and led to him transferring to the College of William & Mary and switching over to English as his major, graduating in 1994 with a minor in fine arts as well.

His first job was for a role-playing company called Day by Day Associates, and involved role-playing a criminal at the local police academy and at Hogan's Alley in Quantico, Virginia to help train police officers and FBI agents. He later worked in a toy store and as a campus center supervisor.

== Career ==
=== 1993-2003: Tabletop games and Interplay ===
==== Early projects, Fallout 2 and Planescape: Torment ====
Avellone's hobby of gamemastering for tabletop roleplaying games made him try to get his adventures and articles published. Starting in his high school years, he sent a large number of submissions to Dungeon magazine, Dragon magazine, Palladium Books, GURPS and Hero Games, but they were all rejected. However, when Hero Games had a new product line for their Champions RPG called Dark Champions and needed writers, Hero Games' line editor Bruce Harlick contacted Avellone, asking him to write a character book for it, which he agreed to, resulting in 1993's Underworld Enemies. It was followed by Dystopia in 1994, Widows & Orphans in 1997 and New Bedlam Asylum in 1998, as well as contributions to the adventure anthologies Heroic Adventures Volume 1 and Volume 2 in 1996 and to Dragon, Alarums and Excursions, Adventurers Club and Shadis throughout that period. Avellone was also one of the authors involved in the fanzine Haymaker! alongside Harlick.

After asking Steve Peterson, his editor at Hero Games, to help him find him a job with a steady paycheck, Peterson put in a recommendation for him with Mark O'Green, the head of Interplay Productions' Dragonplay division. At the beginning of June 1995, Avellone flew to Irvine, California and interviewed with O'Green, who asked him hard questions about how he would go about designing a video game in the Planescape campaign setting, which Interplay had recently acquired the video game rights for. Avellone told him he would "start at the death screen, and just tell the story of what happens after that". O'Green was intrigued and hired him as a junior designer.

His first task at Interplay was to design cities for a Dungeons & Dragons game set in the Forgotten Realms. When that project was cancelled a few months later, he was transferred to the role of a level designer on Descent to Undermountain, a first person 3D dungeon crawler that was also set in the Forgotten Realms and repurposed the engine used by 1995's spaceship combat game Descent. According to Avellone: "I didn't know what I was getting into! I was very happy to work on it at the time, though. They were trying to add gravity and first-person combat into the Descent engine, you know, so they could create something [like] Ultima Underworld. The engine just wasn't set up to do that, and we didn't have the sheer amount of programming power available to make that happen."

While working on Undermountain, he was also asked to contribute writing and design to other games. The first of these to be released was Conquest of the New World, a turn-based historical strategy game developed by Quicksilver Software which was published by Interplay in 1996. Because Quicksilver were only a few streets away from Interplay, designers from Interplay including Avellone were asked to help with lore additions to the game whenever needed. He then contributed mission design to Interplay's 1997 game Star Trek: Starfleet Academy, a space flight simulator that made extensive use of full motion video.

By late 1996, Feargus Urquhart – who had replaced O'Green as the head of Interplay's role-playing division, soon to be known as Black Isle Studios – was being mandated to make use of the Planescape license by his superiors and became interested in making a game for it using the Infinity Engine, the isometric engine in BioWare's Baldur's Gate, which was then in development and which Interplay had access to as BioWare's publisher. Urquhart asked Avellone if he was interested in being the lead designer on the new project and Avellone agreed, seeing it as an opportunity. Avellone initially titled the game Planescape: Last Rites, and, recalling the design ideas he had shared with O'Green in his hiring interview, used them as the starting point for the game, coming up with a story where the player character was an amnesiac immortal trapped in an endless cycle of death and rebirth. The resulting vision document was warmly received by Interplay's studio head Brian Fargo, who nonetheless asked Avellone to promise he could actually deliver on it. During the game's pre-production, Avellone was given a very small team that consisted of lead programmer Dan Spitzley, lead artist Tim Donley and two other artists, sharing an office with them. As Avellone described it:

Once the vision document was approved, we scaled it down and outwards and turned each bit into reality. The lead artist, Tim Donley, did sketches of each of the major locations one by one before they were arted on the computer. I then took the characters and quests and did area design documents. I wrote a first pass of much of the dialogue and companions (many of which made it all the way to the final draft). All the while our programmers started digging into the Infinity Engine (which wasn’t done at that time, since Baldur’s Gate 1 was still going on) and learning more about how it worked so we could see if our ideas were feasible or not.

Avellone incorporated the many ideas for fantasy quests and characters he had gathered over the years into his design and sought to turn fantasy conventions upside down. Around this time, Tim Cain also offered Avellone a role on Fallout as a designer, but Avellone had to turn him down because, between Last Rites and his continued responsibilities on Undermountain, he was already overburdened with work, and he recommended Scott Bennie for the role instead.

At the beginning of 1997, Avellone asked Urquhart to be transferred to full-time work on Last Rites because he no longer felt there was much he could contribute to Undermountain given that game's development troubles, but this request was only granted in the summer of that year. When Colin McComb was assigned to Last Rites as its second designer in April 1997, he found that Avellone already had a broad outline of the entire game from start to finish, with all of the major characters sketched out. It was soon realized that the name Last Rites was already trademarked and being used for another company's game, which led to their project being renamed into Planescape: Torment after many other possible names for it were rejected. Throughout that period, Avellone also contributed writing to Interplay's racing combat game Red Asphalt and Treyarch's swordfighting action-adventure game Die by the Sword, both of them released in early 1998.

Undermountain was finally released in January 1998 and sold poorly and was widely panned by critics. That same month, Fallout's central creative trio of Tim Cain, Leonard Boyarsky and Jason Anderson decided to leave Interplay and start their own company which they named Troika Games. This created an uncertain future for Fallout 2, which they had been leading development on for a few months, so designers, programmers and artists were taken from other projects and assigned to help with it. This included Avellone, who became an area designer on the game and designed New Reno, Vault City, the raider caves and the game's various special encounters. His work on New Reno is how Avellone "first came to people's attention", as it has been called "one of the most beloved locations in any RPG" and "possibly Avellone's single greatest creation [...] emblematic of everything a true RPG should be: non-linear, dynamic, detailed, and expertly written". Fallout 2 was released in October 1998 and has been ranked by video game publications as one of the best RPGs of all time, though Avellone has expressed misgivings about the game's tonal inconsistencies and overuse of breaking the fourth wall.

While working on Fallout 2, he also continued writing the story and dialogue for Torment, which led to him having 160 hour workweeks that kept him exhausted. Once Fallout 2 was finished, he immediately had to enter crunch time again on Torment as the game's development team expanded from the 10 people it had at that point to between 35 and 40 by the end. McComb would later estimate that, although there were seven other designers on his team, Avellone did approximately half of the design work on the project. However, as the game's localization costs mounted due to its long script and quality assurance testers regarded it as the strangest game they had worked on, Avellone thought that Torment would be poorly received at large and was afraid he was going to be fired. When Torment was released in December 1999, it instead sold moderately well and received very positive reviews. It has since become regarded as one of the greatest video games of all time and has been especially praised for reaching a quality of writing that had not existed in games up to that point.

By the end of the game's development, Avellone's health had declined significantly from the long hours and he was advised by his doctor to not continue down that path. Interplay's vice president Trish Wright also became concerned and helped reduce his workload. When Urquhart and Donley asked him if he was willing to work on a sequel to Torment, Avellone declined, saying he was too tired.

==== Icewind Dale series, Van Buren and collaborations with Snowblind ====
Most of the Torment team then wanted to work on a new fantasy intellectual property which became known as Black Isle's Torn, while Avellone opted to join a different team inside Black Isle which, after the release of Fallout 2, had spent a few months working on a sequel for that game, but had not made good progress in that time with either its design or its switch to a new 3D engine. After promising them another chance to make that sequel in the future, Urquhart had tasked them in May 1999 with developing Icewind Dale, a more traditional Dungeons & Dragons game which, like Baldur's Gate, was set in the Forgotten Realms and also used the Infinity Engine, but was more linear and had a strong focus on dungeon crawling. Despite joining halfway through development, Avellone wrote the dialogues of all the major NPCs in Icewind Dale and also edited those written by the other designers. Additionally, he designed a number of quests for the starting town of Easthaven and many of the special items in the game, as well as writing the game's narrative style guide and manual. He was also one of the few technical designers involved with directly implementing content in the game. Icewind Dale was released in June 2000 and was well-received, but was regarded by Avellone and the general public as not pushing the genre forward compared to Black Isle's previous games.

During his time on Icewind Dale, Avellone also wrote a vision document for the project codenamed Van Buren, which was the promised next attempt at continuing the Fallout series. Once it was approved, he became the lead designer on it and worked on it for the next three years, doing area design, maps, character breakdowns, items and plot elements for all the locations in the game. Avellone felt the game had the potential to be better than Torment, as everything in its design seemed to be clicking into place, but none of the teams at Black Isle were available to work on it, and it languished in pre-production with Avellone as the sole person assigned to it, his only chance to playtest and refine his design coming from tabletop sessions based around it that he ran for his fellow developers.

A few weeks after the release of Icewind Dale, work began on an expansion pack for it called Heart of Winter. At fellow designer Josh Sawyer's suggestion, its story was based on the lore Avellone had written for one of his Easthaven quests, and Avellone continued his dialogue-focused duties on the title. Heart of Winter was released in February 2001 and was not as well-received as the original game, mainly because of its short length. To allay the fans' complaints, the team including Avellone then developed a free but smaller downloadable expansion called Trials of the Luremaster, which was released in July 2001.

During Heart of Winter's development, Avellone was also asked to write the story for Baldur's Gate: Dark Alliance, a console action RPG that Interplay had tasked Snowblind Studios with developing in an attempt to enter the increasingly lucrative console market. Although Avellone quickly wrote a draft of the storyline that he liked, it became a target for what he called "the most mind-boggling iterations and suggestions" from his bosses, and he was unhappy with the result as he felt it was lacking and not similar to his original vision.

Black Isle's Torn, which Avellone did not work on but had offered occasional design input on, was cancelled in July 2001, as Urquhart estimated it would not be done in time to help Interplay with the financial difficulties it was going through. Development on Icewind Dale II was started in its place, once again using the Infinity Engine, with Sawyer as the lead designer and Avellone doing area design for the starting town of Targos and for Kuldahar, which he greatly enjoyed because of the unusual amount of freedom the designers were given on the project. Icewind Dale II was released in August 2002 and received positive reviews, although the public felt its engine had become too dated.

In early 2002, production began on Lionheart: Legacy of the Crusader, an alternate history action RPG developed by Reflexive Entertainment and published by Interplay, on which Avellone was assigned to provide design assistance for a short while after its overall storyline had already been established several months into development. Afterwards, before he could return to work on Van Buren, he contributed to the design of Baldur's Gate III: The Black Hound, Black Isle's attempt at making a Dungeons & Dragons game in a 3D engine that had to use Baldur's Gate in its name despite having little to do with it because Interplay had supposedly retained the license for it, but not the license for the Forgotten Realms in general. Once the license turned out to have been lost because of unpaid royalties, The Black Hound was cancelled after a year and a half of active development, which made Urquhart leave the company in frustration in April 2003. For the first time, a full team was now available to work on Van Buren, but Avellone did not believe it was possible to make the game any longer given Interplay's financial troubles and the management's complete focus on the console market, so he also left the company a couple of months after Urquhart. His assessment turned out to be correct when, half a year later, Black Isle was shut down and Van Buren was cancelled.

Now a free agent, Avellone was invited by Snowblind Studios to help with the writing on their next game, Champions of Norrath: Realms of EverQuest — another console action RPG in the same vein as Dark Alliance but taking place in the EverQuest universe — as they had enjoyed working with Avellone despite their relationship with Black Isle becoming frayed after Black Isle had used their engine to make Dark Alliance II without their permission or involvement.

=== 2003-2015: Chief creative officer at Obsidian Entertainment ===
==== Founding of Obsidian, Star Wars: Knights of the Old Republic II and Neverwinter Nights 2 ====
After leaving Interplay, Avellone was asked by Urquhart to join him as one of the five co-founders of a new company named Obsidian Entertainment which aimed to develop the same kind of games as Black Isle, with Avellone accepting and becoming the company's chief creative officer.

Obsidian received their first project very quickly when BioWare, who were almost done developing the cross-platform RPG Star Wars: Knights of the Old Republic for LucasArts, passed on the opportunity to make a sequel for it and recommended Obsidian for the job based on their previous relationship with Black Isle. Avellone thus became the lead designer of Star Wars Knights of the Old Republic II: The Sith Lords, a role which he was not pleased with at first as he had not been a fan of Star Wars since his childhood, but which gradually became interesting to him as he immersed himself in the franchise, reading all of its novels and comic books, and realized he could explore the questions he had about its universe through his design and try to recapture the feeling of The Empire Strikes Back, his favorite movie in the series.

However, the task of making a sequel to a AAA game was fraught with difficulties, as Obsidian initially had no employees and no office space, with the co-founders working in Urquhart's attic. Additionally, Avellone had to write a blind first draft of the story without having played the original KOTOR, as it had not yet been released and LucasArts did not want to provide a copy of it before a full contract had been officially signed, which then led to Avellone having to start over with an entirely different story once he was able to play it.

After a contract was signed in August 2003, Obsidian were able to move into an office in Santa Ana and hire enough employees to start full production on the game by October, but still had a very aggressive schedule that required them to finish the game within a year. Avellone wrote the game's overall storyline and most of the companions and did area design for Peragus, Malachor V, part of Nar Shaddaa and other smaller areas, while also dividing and coordinating the tasks of six other designers. KOTOR II was released on time in December 2004 in what many regarded as a partially unfinished state, but still received very positive reviews, with its story being named one of the greatest in video games and in the Star Wars franchise.

After KOTOR II, Avellone pitched comic book publisher Dark Horse a comic named Unseen, Unheard about characters from the game, which he then wrote for the final issue of Star Wars Tales published in July 2005. This also led to him contributing short stories to the Star Wars: Clone Wars Adventures comic series until it ended in December 2007.

In July 2004, Obsidian began development on Neverwinter Nights 2, a Dungeons & Dragons PC RPG taking place in the Forgotten Realms, after another situation in which BioWare, who had developed the first game, recommended Obsidian to its publisher, in this case Atari, for developing the sequel. Avellone joined the game's development team once KOTOR II was finished and was primarily responsible for writing major characters, including the game's companions and their associated quests, but also for implementing influence mechanics and critiquing area designs, and additionally proofread almost all the dialogue in the game. Despite the game's design having an unrealistically large scope that created difficulties and led to its original lead designer Ferret Baudoin being replaced by Josh Sawyer in March 2006, Neverwinter Nights 2 had generally favorable reviews when released in October 2006, with its story and writing noted as being its strong points.

As Obsidian began to always have multiple projects in pre-production or development at any given time, Avellone — in his capacity as the company's chief creative officer — oversaw the high-level design on all of them, offering feedback and critiques on prototypes, game builds and design documents, as well as writing and improving pitches for new games and talking to publishers about them. Obsidian's third project Dwarfs, an RPG prequel to Snow White and the Seven Dwarves that Obsidian was enlisted to create by Disney in 2005, was the first one that Avellone did not have a direct role on, with his involvement instead consisting of reviewing the work done by its lead designer Kevin Saunders and its lead story writer Brian Mitsoda and offering insight into which elements in its story achieved their goals and which elements needed improvement.

In July 2006, pre-production began on Mask of the Betrayer, the first expansion pack for Neverwinter Nights 2, with Avellone offering designer George Ziets the role of creative lead on it and giving him a lot of flexibility on its story and setting, which Ziets used by exploring the religious and mythological elements in the Forgotten Realms that were the most interesting to him. One of the five companions intended for the expansion, the half-celestial cleric Kaelyn the Dove, was almost cut early on when it was estimated she could not be written and implemented in the time the team had available. Avellone, who was not directly assigned to the project at the time, asked to write her himself so she could be kept, with Ziets remarking that she then ended up being his favorite companion in the game. Avellone also wrote a second companion for it, the spirit shaman Gann-of-Dreams. As the expansion neared release, its lead designer Kevin Saunders noted that the dialogues of the new companions were richer and longer than those of the most developed companions in Neverwinter Nights 2. Mask of the Betrayer was released in September 2007 and was well-received, with game publications calling it the best Dungeons & Dragons experience since Baldur's Gate II: Shadows of Amn and Torment and sometimes referring to it as a thematic sequel of the latter.

==== Alpha Protocol and Fallout: New Vegas ====
In early 2006, Sega expressed interest in having Obsidian develop a cross-platform RPG for them and were pitched an idea from Urquhart and fellow co-founder Chris Jones about making an espionage RPG that took place in the present and incorporated ideas from Burn Notice, James Bond, the Bourne series and 24. Sega liked it and decided to pursue the project, with Obsidian intending at first to retain the intellectual property rights for it, but soon giving them to Sega in return for more funding so they could prevent layoffs when, as the deal with Sega had almost been finalized, Dwarfs was cancelled by Disney because the new leadership at that company wanted to avoid going in that game's direction with the Snow White intellectual property. Brian Mitsoda was reassigned from writing the story for Dwarfs to being the creative lead on the espionage RPG, which was named Alpha Protocol. Sega announced their collaboration with Obsidian on a game based on new intellectual property on March 23, 2006.

Near the end of 2006, Sega asked Obsidian to also begin development on a second cross-platform RPG to be published by them, this time based on the Alien franchise, with the project being named Aliens: Crucible. Avellone was assigned as its creative lead and sought to incorporate survival mechanics into the title, giving players the goal of building up a base over time and carefully managing their resources in a tense atmosphere where they would be vulnerable to attack even during conversations. The game was officially announced by Sega in December 2006.

In early 2008, when Alpha Protocol was halfway through development, it became apparent that its vision had not been well-defined and that, in the absence of a project director, its leads were each trying to make a different kind of game. When Mitsoda left Obsidian soon after, Avellone was moved over to Alpha Protocol and became its lead designer — though not in charge of its gameplay systems, which were handled by lead systems designer Matt MacLean — while Josh Sawyer took over the design of Aliens: Crucible. Avellone created a new storyline for Alpha Protocol that was less linear and allowed for a very large number of player choices, while reusing character designs, locations and plot points from Mitsoda's iteration of the story. Avellone wrote most of the characters in the game, except for their emails, which were written by Matt MacLean, and except for the characters in Taipei and the peripheral ones in Rome, which were written by narrative designer Travis Stout. Avellone estimated there were approximately 120 hours of dialogue in the final game of which players would only hear between 22% and 33% in a single playthrough.

In February 2009, Aliens: Crucible was cancelled by Sega in favor of Alpha Protocol, which they deemed to be much farther along in development. After a round of layoffs at Obsidian, Urquhart began talking to Todd Vaughn, the vice president of development at Bethesda Softworks, about making a game for them, as Vaughn had previously raised that possibility as early as 2004, but Obsidian had never had any free teams whenever it had come up. Bethesda, who had obtained the rights to make Fallout games in 2004 during Interplay's bankruptcy and had released their own Fallout 3 in October 2008, were now busy developing The Elder Scrolls V: Skyrim and would not be able to make a Fallout 4 for a long time, which made them interested in having an external studio develop another Fallout title in the interim to avoid a large gap between titles. Obsidian were thus asked by Bethesda to pick an interesting location in the Western United States and pitch a Fallout game around it. After multiple people at Obsidian independently chose Las Vegas as a signature western city, Avellone wrote a story pitch about a stranger getting shot in the head and dropped in a shallow grave in the desert, with Vegas visible in the distance. Bethesda approved it, signing up on the development of Fallout: New Vegas, with the Aliens: Crucible team being transferred to it and Sawyer becoming the game's project director and lead designer. As Sawyer had taken part in Avellone's Van Buren pen and paper campaigns at Black Isle and had become the lead designer on that game for its final six months, he incorporated certain elements from it into New Vegas, such as Hoover Dam as a plot-important location, the Caesar's Legion tribal confederation as a major faction, the mentally ill Nightkin super mutants as occasionally encountered characters and the caravan wars as part of the story's background.

Avellone moved over from Alpha Protocol to the New Vegas team as a senior designer in October 2009. Alpha Protocol, which had originally been meant to be released that same month, was delayed to May 2010 after management at Sega decided it would have a more favorable release window then, but the game did not receive any additional development time during the delay. Upon its release, Alpha Protocol received lukewarm reviews, with frequent criticisms about its gameplay being clunky and bland, while its storytelling and freedom of choice were praised. Although Avellone had many ideas for a sequel and wanted to have an even more complex story in it, the game was not financially successful and Sega was not interested in turning it into a series. The game has, however, become regarded as a cult classic because of its unique style of reactivity.

For New Vegas, Avellone wrote two companions: Ulysses, a former scout from Caesar's Legion who was supposed to provide insight into the game's events from the perspective of that faction, and Rose of Sharon Cassidy, the hard-drinking caravaneer daughter of Cassidy, a Fallout 2 companion who had also been written by Avellone and had been Sawyer's favorite companion in the series. Avellone also provided writing for the game's ending slides, the endgame characters Legate Lanius and General Oliver, as well as for the Mojave Outpost and the REPCONN Headquarters areas, and helped lead writer John Gonzalez with structuring the story and its associated character dialogues, as Gonzalez was not used to writing branching narratives. After getting Dark Horse in touch with Bethesda, Avellone also wrote All Roads, a graphic novel included with the collector's edition of New Vegas that detailed the events leading up to the beginning of the game. However, as development on New Vegas was nearing the end, it was realized that Ulysses as a companion had so much dialogue that it would not have fit on the game's disc and there was not enough time to trim it down, which led to his complete removal, a difficult task in itself given that his dialogue had so many different hooks into the storyline. Avellone decided instead to reuse the character as an overarching antagonist in the downloadable content expansions that were planned, with foreshadowing about his new story being added to the base game. New Vegas was released in October 2010 and was well-reviewed, but received significant criticism for its technical issues. With the passing of time, it has become regarded as one of the greatest RPGs of all time.

New Vegas received four downloadable content expansions, with Avellone being the project director and lead designer on three of them: Dead Money, Old World Blues and Lonesome Road. Avellone shared writing duties on Old World Blues with Travis Stout, but did almost all of the writing on the other two. In Dead Money, the story revolved around the player character being kidnapped, fitted with an explosive collar and forced to rob an impenetrable casino with the help of three other characters in the same predicament. Avellone sought to create a survival horror experience for it based on an idea he had originally had while working on Torment after watching the 1997 film Cube and which centered on taking disparate personalities that would normally be very hostile to each other and forcing them to work together, focusing on the themes of greed and human nature. To provide a contrast to the dark atmosphere of the other expansions, Old World Blues had a much more humorous story that involved the player character being taken to the highly advanced scientific facility of Big MT, having their brain stolen, and exploring the remains of the facility to recover it. Its story was conceived around the theme of "the optimistic atomic future of what might have been" and the idea that the advanced technology in the Fallout setting could have saved the world if it had not been misused by its creators. Lonesome Road was inspired by the final image at the end of the original Fallout of that game's protagonist being cast out of their home and attempted to evoke the same sense of abandonment by having the player explore an area that their character had caused devastation for in the past, with rival courier Ulysses holding them responsible for it and waiting to confront them inside. The New Vegas expansions were released between December 2010 and September 2011 and have been praised for providing "some of the best sci-fi in games", with Old World Blues in particular being named one of the greatest video game expansions ever.

In early 2011, a team led by Sawyer created a demo for a project named Stormlands, a fantasy action RPG set in a world of magical storms, and pitched it to Microsoft, who decided to sign up on publishing it as they wanted to have an RPG as a launch title for the Xbox One in 2013. Meanwhile, as Avellone was finishing work on the Fallout: New Vegas expansions, he also began developing new pitches for the studio, including pitches to Bethesda for spin-offs to The Elder Scrolls series, one of which would have taken place in an alternate world that the heroes of previous games had failed in saving, and which were meant to serve a similar role to New Vegas by filling in the gap between major installments, but they were not picked up.

==== Forays into crowdfunding and final projects at Obsidian ====
On February 8, 2012, game developer Double Fine launched a campaign on crowdfunding service Kickstarter to raise funds for a new adventure game and reached their stated goal of $400,000 in less than 8 hours, which was unprecedented at the time. This inspired Avellone to write a blog post soon after asking fans what kind of project they wanted to potentially see Obsidian launch a Kickstarter campaign around, the responses to which briefly crashed the Obsidian website after it received more traffic than it could handle, but revealed that the most requested project was a sequel to Planescape: Torment. That same month, Wizards of the Coast, who held the license for Planescape, were contacted about the possibility of providing it, but were not interested.

Former Interplay studio head Brian Fargo, who had left Interplay in early 2002 and founded another company named inXile Entertainment later that year, was also inspired by Double Fine's success and decided to use Kickstarter to crowdfund Wasteland 2, the sequel to the 1988 post-apocalyptic RPG Wasteland on which he had been the game director, announcing his decision to do so on February 15. Aware that Wasteland had been one of Avellone's favorite games, Fargo initially contacted him asking him to provide a promotional quote for the Kickstarter campaign, which resulted in Avellone writing a blog post in support of it on February 21. Shortly afterwards, Fargo asked him if he was interested in working on the game, to which Avellone replied that he was, leading to an arrangement between Fargo and Urquhart whereby Obsidian would be paid for Avellone's participation on it.

On March 12, 2012, Stormlands was cancelled, as Obsidian's vision for the project had become increasingly disconnected from Microsoft's demands for it. The following day, the largest round of layoffs in Obsidian's history took place, with around 40 employees losing their jobs and company morale reaching its lowest point since the company's inception.

That same day, the Kickstarter campaign for Wasteland 2 was launched and surpassed its original target of $900,000 in only 48 hours. By the end of the month, when it had reached $1.7 million in pledges, it was announced that Avellone would be joining its development team if a new stretch goal of $2.1 million was reached, although Avellone had been unaware when agreeing to his participation that it would be tied to a stretch goal. The campaign ultimately raised slightly over $3 million. Avellone spent around 2 days a week at inXile over the following months and his contributions to the game consisted in writing its vision document and in doing area design for Highpool and the Agricultural Center, along with a few other areas such as the Synth Refinery and Seal Beach that were not included in the final game, as well as providing templates and design formats for the other designers and taking part in story meetings.

Meanwhile, at Obsidian, it was estimated that the company could only keep operating until September, which led to frantic attempts to pitch new games to publishers throughout a period that was later known at the company as the "Summer of Proposals". Ten different games were pitched, including a new Star Wars game resembling Knights of the Old Republic that was named Star Wars: Dark Times and was based on a story written by Avellone that would have taken place between Star Wars: Episode III – Revenge of the Sith and Star Wars: Episode IV – A New Hope. However, none of Obsidian's pitches were picked up by publishers.

As a result of the pressure, a Kickstarter campaign around a spiritual successor to Torment that did not take place in the Planescape setting was considered at Obsidian, and Avellone publicly began expressing interest in one in July 2012. However, after further discussions, a decision was made to instead create a game combining elements from all of the Infinity Engine titles, but with a more traditional fantasy setting inspired by the Forgotten Realms. The resulting game concept was called Project Eternity and, on September 12, 2012, a Kickstarter campaign was launched for it, with an initial funding target of $1.1 million that was reached in just over 24 hours. By the end of the campaign on October 16, it had raised over $3.9 million, the most money ever raised by a video game on Kickstarter at that time.

On November 27, 2012, Brian Fargo acquired the recently expired trademark for the word Torment, later stating that he had waited patiently for someone to do something with it, but had decided to step in himself and put together a team at inXile to create a similar game to Planescape: Torment, albeit without the Planescape license. Once he had the trademark, Fargo asked Avellone to work on the new game, but Avellone's responsibilities on Project Eternity made it infeasible to do so. In January 2013, it was announced that the game would be called Torment: Tides of Numenera. On March 6, 2013, a Kickstarter campaign was launched for it, with an endorsement from Avellone and an initial funding goal of $900,000 that was reached after just 6 hours, although there was some disappointment among fans that Avellone would not be involved in the game. In the middle of March, however, discussions between Fargo and Urquhart led to an agreement on a workload for Avellone on Numenera that would not negatively impact Project Eternity. On March 22, at which point the Numenera campaign had $2.9 million in funding, it was announced that Avellone would be joining the game's team if a further stretch goal of $3.5 million was reached, with his role consisting of reviewing and providing feedback on the story, characters and areas, as well as writing one of the companions. The campaign passed that goal on April 3, which led to Avellone being referred to as a "human stretch goal" by the gaming press from then on, and ended on April 6 with a final tally of $4.18 million, overtaking Project Eternity to become the highest-funded game on the platform. Avellone created eight different concepts for a companion character, wishing to only settle on one after sufficiently exploring the game's plot and themes, and ultimately chose to write Erritis, an impulsive warrior with a love for danger who was meant to introduce some levity to what Avellone regarded as "an otherwise dark and frightening world."

During a trip to London for a game writers' meetup, Avellone began talking to Tom Jubert, the narrative designer for indie developer Subset Games' science fiction roguelike game FTL: Faster Than Light. Upon discovering who Jubert was, Avellone expressed his appreciation for FTL and offered to write for it. As a result, a few weeks later, Avellone was given the opportunity to do so by Justin Ma and Matthew Davis, the founders of Subset Games, scripting a large number of encounters for FTL: Advanced Edition, an expanded version of the game, around the end of 2013 and being credited as a guest writer on it. The Advanced Edition was released in April 2014.

In December 2013, Project Eternity was renamed into Pillars of Eternity. For Pillars, Avellone provided feedback on the story and wrote two companions: Durance, a cynical priest betrayed by his own god, and the Grieving Mother, a cipher with the ability to draw energy from her soul and mind who used her talents as a midwife but was forced to flee her community after hiding the fact that the children in it were being born without souls. Both characters have been regarded as fan favorites, although a significant part of the content Avellone designed for them, such as sequences where the player entered their subconscious to explore their shared past and understand how to affect their present personalities, did not make it into the final game.

At the beginning of 2014, publisher Paradox Interactive signed up on Obsidian's development of Tyranny, a fantasy RPG using the same engine as Pillars of Eternity that took place in an Iron Age world in which, after an epic struggle between good and evil, evil had won. Avellone was originally the game's creative lead and worked on it throughout its pre-production period. His goals for the title included having a protagonist tasked with restoring order to a conquered area for the forces of evil but provided with the option of rebelling against them, as well as an open world structure where any kind of activity, such as exploring dungeons or doing quests for factions, would cause the story to progress. Pillars of Eternity was released at the end of March 2015, which freed up development resources and led to Tyranny entering full production. However, after a series of disagreements with some of Obsidian's other co-founders about the company's management practices, Avellone left Obsidian in June 2015. Tyranny's game director Brian Heins later noted that concepts, characters and ideas from Avellone's work on the game had been retained.

=== 2015-present: Freelance writing and design ===
After departing Obsidian, Avellone quickly became an in-demand freelance writer and designer, working on multiple games for different companies at any given time and seeking experience in a variety of genres in order to improve his craft.

Some months prior, Avellone had been asked by Raphaël Colantonio, the founder of Arkane Studios and a fan of his work, if he could write for Arkane's new first person science-fiction title, later known as Prey, but Avellone had replied that his full-time position at Obsidian did not allow him to do so. However, upon going freelance, Avellone contacted Colantonio to ask if the offer was still open and found that it was. The two of them initially met up at E3 2015 to discuss the project, after which Avellone flew out to Arkane's studio in Austin, Texas, where he was shown the game and taken through its critical path storyline before being asked to try his hand at writing two of the side characters. Lead designer Ricardo Bare was impressed by the result and Avellone joined the team, writing several of the game's major characters, including neuroscientist Dayo Igwe and chief systems engineer Mikhaila Ilyushin, as well as many of the side ones and their associated quests, while also offering feedback and insights into the story in general and contributing to the game's lore and alternate history.

Also in June 2015, inXile launched a Kickstarter campaign for The Bard's Tale IV, which was billed as a proper sequel to Interplay's The Bard's Tale trilogy from the 1980s, and it reached its funding goal of $1.25 million in 12 days. On June 29, with 11 days remaining, it was announced that Avellone would be joining the game's team if its campaign surpassed $1.9 million in funding and that he would design a deadly dungeon named the Cairn of Horrors for it, but this goal was not reached.

On August 12, 2015, Larian Studios announced they would be launching a Kickstarter campaign for the turn-based tactical RPG Divinity: Original Sin II at the end of the month and asked their community to vote on what reward tiers they wanted to see in it, but many fans reacted by voting for potential stretch goals instead, with Avellone's addition to the team being one of the most requested. This resulted in Larian CEO Swen Vincke meeting up with Avellone at PAX Prime 2015 to discuss the possibility of his involvement. On September 25, it was announced that Avellone would be working on the game, although not as part of a stretch goal. As a senior writer, he was responsible for doing story and companion reviews and also designed and wrote the backstory for the undead playable character and recruitable companion Fane.

In late 2015, BioShock creator Ken Levine contacted Avellone to ask him if he was interested in working on the first game from his new studio Ghost Story Games, which Avellone immediately agreed to as he had always hoped to get the chance to collaborate with Levine. The game was revealed in December 2022 as Judas.

In September 2016, inXile announced Wasteland 3, with Avellone revealing several months later that he had been working on it. In addition to writing for the game, Avellone was asked to provide ideas and design pillars from his work on Van Buren that could be adapted to the Wasteland setting, with lead designer George Ziets using them as inspiration.

Avellone finished his work on Prey in early 2017. On February 8, 2017, Italian game developer Gamera Interactive announced the isometric action-RPG Alaloth: Champions of the Four Kingdoms, with Avellone as a creative consultant working on the lore, world design and character backstories for the game. Alaloth was an unusually art-centric project from Avellone's perspective, as a lot of concept art had already been created for the characters in the game and he was tasked with using it as a starting point for writing deeper stories around them.

On February 10, 2017, Subset Games announced the turn-based strategy game Into the Breach, as well as Avellone's involvement in writing and world-building for it. The game depicted the conflict between human civilization and giant insectile aliens, with the player controlling time-traveling mechs attempting to save the remnants of humanity across multiple timelines. Avellone designed the varied personalities of the mech pilots, giving them many different reactions to gameplay situations, as well as fleshing out the lore of the corporations in the game and writing the dialogues of their CEOs. Its storytelling, though minimalist, was praised by game journalists, with Kotaku describing it as "full of interesting plot possibilities when it comes to time travel and universe jumping, and where exactly, from a sci-fi point of view, the two meet" and Rock Paper Shotgun noting that "its short lines drip with implication about the rules of time travel, parallel realities and the motivations and peccadilloes of its pilots".

In March 2017, Beamdog announced Planescape: Torment: Enhanced Edition, a remaster of Torment for which Avellone helped curate improvements as well as doing an editorial pass of all the text in the game. Avellone was also a consultant on Beamdog's short-lived attempt to make a new Planescape game which failed due to lack of publisher interest.

On May 17, 2017, Owlcat Games announced Pathfinder: Kingmaker, the first computer RPG based on the universe of the tabletop Pathfinder Roleplaying Game, an offshoot of Dungeons and Dragons from game publisher Paizo, and also announced that Avellone would be contributing narrative design to the title. Owlcat had already secured the budget to make the game, but they launched a Kickstarter campaign at the beginning of June to increase it and allow for more companions, areas and quests to be included, successfully reaching their goal of $500k on June 26 and ending up with a final tally of $909k two weeks later. Although Kingmaker was based on an eponymous series of adventure modules for Pathfinder, Avellone helped the studio expand its story so it would have enough new content for people who had played the original tabletop version of it. He also wrote one of the companions — the goblin rogue Nok-Nok — from start to finish, worked with the other designers on setting up the quest arcs for companions across the game, and assisted with the writing and editing of a large number of characters.

In July 2017, Green Tree Games announced a tactical leadership World War II RPG titled Burden of Command, bringing Avellone in as a senior advisor tasked with guiding the developers on "creating empathy, memorable characters, and compelling narrative arcs". Avellone noted that, in a shift from other World War II games, Burden of Command would focus on dealing with the emotional pressure of being in command and having to accomplish your mission while also protecting your soldiers.

In January 2018, Montreal-based studio Spearhead Games announced Omensight, an action role-playing game revolving around a time looping mystery which included Avellone on its writing team.

In June 2018, publisher Electronic Arts announced Star Wars Jedi: Fallen Order, an action-adventure game developed by Respawn Entertainment. In March 2019, Avellone revealed that he had recently finished up his work on it, which consisted of story contributions, story and character reviews and the writing of certain cinematic scripts. Avellone was thrilled to work on Star Wars again and noted that he appreciated the game's story taking place after Episode III, as that timeframe provided a lot of potential for drama and conflict.

In December 2018, Norwegian game developer Moondrop Studios announced that Avellone had written the story for its upcoming cooperative puzzle platformer Degrees of Separation, a game following two characters, Ember and Rime, the former from a world of warmth and light and the latter from a world of cold and darkness, who use their contrasting powers to overcome obstacles together. Having never worked on a platformer before, Avellone saw it as a chance to stretch his writing skills further, and was also intrigued by the ways in which the gameplay mechanics were meant to reflect changes in the relationship between the two characters, with them building bridges when supportive of each other and later having explosive powers when arguing with each other.

In December 2019, Owlcat announced Pathfinder: Wrath of the Righteous, their second Pathfinder game, once again having Avellone involved as a narrative designer. Several days later, Avellone revealed that he had also been working on the action role-playing game Weird West, the first game from Raphaël Colantonio's new company WolfEye Studios.

In June 2025, it was announced that Avellone had joined the inaugural project of Republic Games, a new studio founded by video game writer Adam Williams. The unnamed project is a dystopian fantasy game described as "A tyrannical regime is brutally enforcing its ideology and crushing all dissent. But a faction of rebels seeks to overturn the tyrants and expose the lies at the heart of their doctrine." Avellone has also been brought on by Red Info, a studio founded by Robert Kurvitz and Aleksander Rostov, former leads at ZA/UM for Disco Elysium, to help with developing the story for their planned spiritual sequel to Disco Elysium.

== Misconduct accusations and retraction ==
In June 2020, Avellone was accused by two people of using his status for sexual misconduct and harassment towards women during industry conventions. Following these allegations, Techland announced that they and Avellone agreed to end his work on Dying Light 2. Gato Studios also removed Avellone from The Waylanders; according to lead writer Emily Grace Buck, Avellone had "very little writing" over that project, having only penned a few quests that they planned to rewrite. Paradox Interactive said that while Avellone had worked on an early version of Vampire: The Masquerade – Bloodlines 2, much of his work had since been overwritten.

Avellone published a denial of the allegations through Medium in June 2021 and stated he had filed a libel suit against two accusers in a California court. This libel suit was settled in March 2023, with a settlement that "provides for a seven-figure payment" from the accusers to Avellone. Concurrently the two accusers retracted their original accusations, stating that "Mr. Avellone never sexually abused either of us", and that "We have no knowledge that he has ever sexually abused any women." They also claimed in the same statement that their previous public statements with regards to Avellone had been "misinterpreted".

== Works ==
=== Video games ===
Year	Title	Role(s)
1996	Conquest of the New World	Designer
1997	Star Trek: Starfleet Academy	Additional mission designer
1998	Descent to Undermountain	Lead creative designer; level designer
1998	Fallout 2	Designer
1999	Planescape: Torment	Lead designer; lead writer
2000	Icewind Dale	Designer
2001	Icewind Dale: Heart of Winter	Designer
2001	Baldur's Gate: Dark Alliance	Senior designer
2002	Icewind Dale II	Designer
2004	Champions of Norrath	Level designer; script doctor
2004	Star Wars Knights of the Old Republic II	Lead designer; lead writer
2006	Neverwinter Nights 2	Senior designer
2007	Neverwinter Nights 2: Mask of the Betrayer	Senior designer
2010	Alpha Protocol	Lead designer; lead writer
2010	Fallout: New Vegas	Senior designer; project lead on most of the DLC
2014	FTL: Advanced Edition	Writer
2014	Wasteland 2	Area designer
2015	Pillars of Eternity	Writer
2016	Tyranny	Original world and story designer
2017	Torment: Tides of Numenera	Writer
2017	Prey	Writer
2017	Divinity: Original Sin II	Additional narrative designer
2018	Into the Breach	Writer
2018	Pathfinder: Kingmaker	Narrative designer
2018	Omensight	Writer
2019	Degrees of Separation	Writer
2019	Star Wars Jedi: Fallen Order	Writer
2020	Wasteland 3	Additional writer
2021	Pathfinder: Wrath of the Righteous	Narrative designer
2022	Weird West	Additional designer
2024	Alaloth: Champions of the Four Kingdoms	Creative consultant; writer
2025	Burden of Command	Advisor
TBA	Judas	Narrative designer

=== Comics ===
==== Star Wars ====
- "Unseen, Unheard" (2005)
- "Heroes on Both Sides" (2006)
- "Impregnable" (2007)
- "Old Scores" (2007)
- "Graduation Day" (2007)

==== Fallout ====
- Fallout: New Vegas - All Roads (2010, part of the Fallout: New Vegas collector's edition)

=== Prose fiction ===
- "The House of Wael" (2016, to Pillars of Eternity Kickstarter backers)

=== Tabletop role-playing game modules ===
- The Puzzle Box (2020, to Pathfinder: Kingmaker Kickstarter backers)
- Dystopia (published 1994 by Atlas Games, supplement for Champions and Dark Champions)
