= Neverwinter Nights 2: Storm of Zehir =

Expansion pack

- Developer: Obsidian Entertainment
- Publisher: Atari Interactive
- Producer: Kevin Saunders
- Designer: Tony Evans
- Programmer: Richard Taylor
- Artist: Justin Cherry
- Writer: Annie Carlson
- Composer: Alexander Brandon
- Series: Neverwinter Nights
- Engine: Electron
- Platform: Microsoft Windows
- Release: NA: November 18, 2008; EU: November 21, 2008; AU: December 11, 2008
- Genre: Role-playing video game
- Modes: Single-player, multiplayer

Neverwinter Nights 2: Storm of Zehir is an expansion pack for the role-playing video game Neverwinter Nights 2, developed by Obsidian Entertainment and published by Atari Interactive It was released in late 2008 in North America, Europe, and Australia. Like previous entries in the Neverwinter Nights series, Storm of Zehir is based on the paper and pencil fantasy role-playing game Dungeons & Dragons, and uses the game's 3.5 edition ruleset.

Storm of Zehir was inspired by older video games like the Baldur's Gate and Icewind Dale franchises. The storyline foreshadows the events of the fourth edition of Dungeons & Dragons and follows the adventures of a group of merchants in the Samarach and Sword Coast areas of the Forgotten Realms campaign setting.

Storm of Zehir received mixed reviews from critics. Reviewers were pleased with new features introduced in the game, like more options for party customization and an overland map, but were not impressed with the game's storyline and technical achievements.

== Gameplay ==
Storm of Zehir is an expansion of Neverwinter Nights 2 and continues the formula of a role-playing video game played from an overhead third-person perspective. Players first create a character along the lines of the Dungeons & Dragons 3.5 rules by selecting a variety of traits, such as race, class, and feats. New character creation options include the yuan-ti pureblood and gray orc races, the swashbuckler class, and the hellfire warlock and doomguide of Kelemvor prestige classes. The rest of the player's party can also be created, unlike Neverwinter Nights 2, but pre-made characters are available if the player is not interested in complete customization. The party can then explore several regions on the Forgotten Realms continent of Faerûn. The game provides an overland map that is used to move between different areas like towns and dungeons. While on the map, characters can use various skills to identify treasure, monsters, and other points of interest, such as side quests and secret locations. The party can rest while on the map, but doing so puts them at risk of random encounters in the form of wandering monsters.

Storm of Zehir's character creation menu. A list of feats is shown.

In combat, players have access to a variety of abilities and magic spells, based on the makeup of the party. Storm of Zehir uses the dice-based d20 System of Dungeons & Dragons and each action requires a random number generated by a die roll. The player can control a character individually by selecting specific actions to be taken against enemies, or allow the game's artificial intelligence to fight by using a pre-selected set of behaviors for each character. Defeating monsters and completing quests bestows experience points on the party, which are used to gain levels and become more powerful.

The player character can engage in other activities outside of combat, such as completing quests and interacting with non-player characters. While in conversation with other characters, the player character can influence them by using several skills, such as "Intimidate" or "Diplomacy". The entire party can assist in this process if they have the appropriate skills. Characters can create weapons, armor, and other goods with raw materials through a system of skill-based crafting. Storm of Zehir also includes a regional economy whereby players can establish trading outposts in various towns and create caravan routes between them, providing merchandise to consumers along each route. The caravans can be personally observed and managed by the player, such as providing security if attacked by bandits.

== Plot ==
The plot events and characters are described, below, using in-universe tone.

=== Setting ===
Like other games in the Neverwinter Nights series, Storm of Zehir takes place in the Forgotten Realms campaign setting, on the continent of Faerûn on the planet Abeir-Toril. It is set mostly in the Samarach and Sword Coast regions, with visits to locations featured in previous games such as Crossroad Keep and the city of Neverwinter. Since the Shadow War depicted in Neverwinter Nights 2 and the subsequent disappearance of the game's protagonist, the Knight–Captain, Neverwinter and the surrounding area have been declining economically. Several merchant companies have been attempting to establish a foothold in the region, with limited success.

=== Story ===
Storm of Zehir's story begins with the player character escorting a ship called the Vigilant, sailing from the Sword Coast to Samarach. Halfling captain Lastri Kassireh quickly advises the party to go below decks in anticipation of an impending storm. The violent storm, coupled with a possible act of sabotage, culminates in the Vigilant becoming shipwrecked on the shores of the xenophobic nation of Samarach. The captain is missing, but the party quickly sets to work organizing the survivors, such as finding defensible positions nearby and salvaging equipment from the wreckage. Before long, a tribe of goblins discovers the group, and their leader issues a challenge in an unknown language. One of the other passengers of the Vigilant, the bard Volothamp "Volo" Geddarm, claims to speak the goblin tongue but inadvertently insults the goblins and instigates a battle. After the goblins are defeated, a group of humans approaches and arrests the party on suspicion of treachery, escorting them to the Open Palm market in the nearby city of Samargol. There, a local merchant named Sa'Sani intervenes on the party's behalf, revealing herself to be the recipient of the goods traveling aboard the waylaid Vigilant. She subsequently recruits the party to investigate the ship's demise and the whereabouts of Captain Kassireh.

After rescuing the captain from goblins, investigating the wreckage of the Vigilant, and recovering some of Sa'Sani's goods, the merchant offers the characters employment in her trading corporation. The party undertakes various missions throughout Samarach for her, establishing trade routes through the jungles of Chult and protecting caravans along them. As the group continues to expand their trading operation, they eventually discover a large plot involving followers of the new yuan-ti god, Zehir. They learn that the yuan-ti, evil serpentine humanoids, have been infiltrating human settlements from their temples in the jungles of Chult and posing as merchants. After Sa'Sani commits an act of murder at Crossroad Keep, the party learns that she is a yuan-ti priestess of Sseth who has adopted this guise. The characters are given the option of aiding Sa'Sani against a powerful yuan-ti House Se'Sehen that shifted its attention to the new god, Zehir. In order to stop the House Se'Sehen's plot to conquer Sword Coast, the party has to infiltrate the House's stronghold, the Temple of the World Serpent, and assassinate N'Safa, the high priest, and a powerful being called the "Herald of Zehir", which is a gift from the god himself. Afterwards, the party has the opportunity to slay Sa'Sani as well.

== Development ==
Development of Storm of Zehir began during the end of development of Neverwinter Nights 2's first expansion, Mask of the Betrayer, and was initially referred to as "NX2" by its designers. The game was formally announced by Atari in June 2008. It would be developed by Obsidian Entertainment, creators of Neverwinter Nights 2 and Mask of the Betrayer, and was given a release date of the fourth quarter of 2008. Despite being released after the fourth edition of Dungeons & Dragons, Storm of Zehir would continue to use the 3.5 edition rules. The design team for Storm of Zehir was smaller than that of Mask of the Betrayer and was given a shorter development period.

Like Neverwinter Nights 2, Obsidian was inspired by older role-playing video games for Storm of Zehir, such as Fallout and the Baldur's Gate series. Assistant producer Rob McGinnis said "[The game] plays more like a classic CRPG". The game was intended to be "more authentic" to pencil and paper Dungeons & Dragons by offering players a light-hearted approach to adventuring and a focus on exploration. The designers included a party system they felt was more teamwork-oriented, such as the ability to custom-make the entire party and allowing party members to collaborate on social interactions. The game's programmers were instructed to include the ability to change party members whenever the player wished.

The tone and flavor of Storm of Zehir is quite a bit different from that of Neverwinter Nights 2 and Mask of the Betrayer. First, the game will be more of a light-hearted adventure than a dark, forbidding tale.

— Kevin Saunders, Obsidian Entertainment

Storm of Zehir's storyline occurs concurrently with Mask of the Betrayer, which was set in the Rashemen region of Faerûn. The story was shaped by lead designer Tony Evans and written by Obsidian designer Annie Carlson. The team leads decided to create an adventure that they considered more in line with the roots of Dungeons & Dragons by departing from the more serious, epic stories presented in Neverwinter Nights 2 and Mask of the Betrayer. Evans said "This direction for the title can be seen throughout - finding random (and not random) goodies while searching the overland map, the addition of the Swashbuckler class, the variety of personalities in the cohorts ..." The game's music was composed with this in mind; Evans wanted themes that would portray the feel of a "light-hearted adventure". Audio director Alexander Brandon collaborated with composers of games like the Heroes of Might and Magic series and Primal, as well as "rookie composers" from Rogue Dao Studios. Brandon had the option of using a live orchestra, but decided against it to include more music in the game.

Obsidian implemented an overland map feature to allow players the opportunity to explore the areas of the game in great detail. Designer Nathaniel Chapman said "Furthermore, it provided an opportunity to increase the effectiveness of various skills that, frankly, were underutilized in previous Neverwinter Nights titles". Obsidian created the map with a design philosophy centered on "interstitial space". Chapman explains:

It's essentially the term for the space that exists between the things you are mainly concerned with in your study. So, if you're interested in looking at cells in the body, the goo that surrounds the cells is referred to as interstitial space. If you're designing a building, the space between each floor is interstitial space. That, in a way, is the space that Overland Maps in games like Fallout, Baldur's Gate, Final Fantasy, Darklands, and, of course, Storm of Zehir are conveying - those monster-filled roads, boundless plains and spooky forests you travel through on your way to meet interesting people (and possibly kill and loot them).

— Nathaniel Chapman, Obsidian Entertainment

Storm of Zehir's overland map. The player's party is visible in the center of the screen, outside of Samargol.

The map's first prototype was inspired by the map seen in the Indiana Jones films. It behaved similarly to normal gameplay, and Obsidian decided to revamp it to create a "more dynamic and reactive interstitial space". Characters would be able to avoid monsters by having a high enough Survival skill and could find hidden items and locations with high Search skills. Groups of adventuring NPCs could be observed and interacted with by players, including helping them fight aggressive monsters. Trade caravans created within the game's economic subplot are visible and the player can actively protect their own investments. The overland map feature was created with the modding community in mind, and players using the Neverwinter Nights 2 toolset can modify the map's options on an individual basis.

Storm of Zehir was ready for mass production on November 1, 2008, and was released on November 18, 2008, in North America, November 21 in Europe, and December 11 in Australia. It was also made available for download on digital distribution service Direct2Drive.

== Reception ==
Reception

Aggregate scores
Aggregator	Score
GameRankings	73%
Metacritic	73/100

Review scores
Publication	Score
1Up.com	B+
GameSpot	6/10
GameSpy	2.5/5
GamesRadar+	7/10
GameZone	8.2/10
IGN	8.3/10
X-Play	4/5

Storm of Zehir received mixed reviews. Critics were generally pleased with the departure from previous games in the series in terms of open-ended gameplay and its similarities to "old school" role-playing video games, but they criticized the game's story and frequency of random encounters. It was a runner-up in the RPG category for IGN's Best of E3 Awards at the Electronic Entertainment Expo video game convention in 2008.

Reviewers were in favor of Storm of Zehir's focus on exploration and the ability to postpone or ignore the game's main storyline, and they compared the gameplay to older role-playing video games such as Icewind Dale II and Fallout. GameZone's reviewer said "This is a game that harkens back to the good old days of adventure D&D video-gaming", and IGN said "this feels like an homage to the old school D&D games of the past". The ability to handcraft an entire party instead of just the main character was welcomed, with GameSpot's reviewer noting "Rather than playing as a solo hero chosen for some great destiny, you roll up a party of four average joes just like you did way back when in D&D classics like the Baldur's Gate and Icewind Dale franchises," (Baldur's Gate did not actually contain the ability to create the entire party in single player mode; however, in multiplayer, this was possible) and IGN saying "There's a strange kind of nerd joy when it comes to creating a D&D party". Reviewers also appreciated the "Party Conversation System", which allows typically underutilized social skills to be used by the entire party during conversation. GameSpy said "It's a terrific convention in which the game responds not to one but to every member of an adventuring party. [Characters] have the option to interject some special comment into a conversation that might open up otherwise unavailable avenues". Reviewers were grateful that the time-based, "spirit-eating" gameplay mechanic of Mask of the Betrayer was not included.

Reviewers generally praised Storm of Zehir's use of the Dungeons & Dragons 3.5 edition rules with the exception of GameSpy, who expressed skepticism of the ruleset in a preview of the game. The game's handling of character death was not well received, despite being more faithful to the pencil and paper version than previous Dungeons & Dragons video games. Unlike Neverwinter Nights 2 and Mask of the Betrayer where defeated characters would be automatically revived after a battle, Storm of Zehir requires a powerful spell or a "Coin of Waukeen" to resurrect dead allies. Reviewers considered this requirement unforgiving; GameSpy said "This merely forces the player to troop back to town through a zillion meaningless random encounters. This may be "realistic" (whatever that means in a world where players fight against newborn gods and sentient snakes), but it's simply not fun. Baldur's Gate had this all worked out over a decade ago. Why do we need to re-invent the wheel?"

Critics gave the game's technical achievements a lukewarm reception. Several reviewers described the Electron engine as aging; IGN Australia said "The two year-old engine is surprisingly sluggish for something that looks dated. The simplistic Overhead Map adds nothing to the visual attractiveness, but this isn't a bad-looking game". GameZone referred to the graphics as "serviceable", and IGN said "The world map is a bit ugly, but otherwise Storm of Zehir looks slightly better than its predecessors". Critics widely panned the voice acting, but praised the music.

Storm of Zehir may have a lackluster story, and that's OK, because it gives you the means--the freedom--to make your own story. And isn't that why we like RPGs in the first place?

— Jason Wilson, 1UP.com

The focal point of criticism was Storm of Zehir's story. Critics considered its focus on trade and economics shallow compared to the epic adventures presented in Neverwinter Nights 2 and Mask of the Betrayer. GameSpy referred to the storyline as a "boringly generic adventure", and GameSpot said "The quests reflect this mundane storyline. You run a lot of lame errands to kill specific monsters and recover lost or stolen merchandise, and you clean out a bunch of formulaic dungeons, caves, graveyards, and the like". Other complaints included the presence of random encounters on the overland map, which were considered excessive, as well as long load times.
