= Kevin Saunders (video game developer) =

American video game designer and producer

Kevin D. Saunders
- Occupations: Game designer, Video game producer
- Known for: Neverwinter Nights 2: Mask of the Betrayer, Torment: Tides of Numenera, Neverwinter Nights 2: Storm of Zehir

Kevin D. Saunders is an American video game designer and producer, best known for his roles in developing Neverwinter Nights 2: Mask of the Betrayer (Producer and Lead Designer), Neverwinter Nights 2: Storm of Zehir (Producer), and Torment: Tides of Numenera (Project Director).

== Early life and education ==
Kevin Saunders created his first game at just six years old, building a ZX81 version of the Intellivision title Astrosmash. His enthusiasm for programming carried into his college years, where he focused on building AI systems for natural‑language processing. His graduate work in environmental engineering involved multi‑day lab experiments that required round‑the‑clock monitoring, giving him long stretches of downtime that he used to explore online games. Saunders earned his Bachelor of Science and graduated with a Master of Engineering degree from Cornell University.

== Career ==
Saunders' graduate work opened the door to his career at Nexon, as director and lead designer on Nexus: The Kingdom of the Winds, one of the earliest MMOGs when it launched in 1998. He went on to design and produce Shattered Galaxy, the first MMO real‑time strategy game, which won multiple awards at the 2001 Independent Games Festival and won of Best Multiplayer Strategy Game of 2001 from GameSpot. Saunders as the producer of Shattered Galaxy was also a guiding voice behind its design philosophy—emphasizing teamwork, tactical coordination, and player cooperation over traditional RTS resource‑gathering. He went on to work as a designer at Westwood Studios as part of Electronic Arts (on Command & Conquer Generals: Zero Hour and Lord of the Rings: The Battle for Middle-Earth), before becoming a senior designer and producer at Obsidian Entertainment (on Star Wars: Knights of the Old Republic II – The Sith Lords, Mask of the Betrayer, Storm of Zehir, Aliens: Crucible, and Dungeon Siege III). He next joined inXile Entertainment, where he served in a production role on Wasteland 2 before helping Torment: Tides of Numenera become, at the time, the most successful Kickstarter ever. He served as project director on Torment, having taken over full development once initial pre‑production was complete, as the project lead for Tides of Numenera, overseeing its successful Kickstarter and managing the entire development team and project until his 2015 departure from inXile. He then returned to Nexon, where he served as Head of Studio on the company's Nebula project. His last game work was for Arcanity, providing story, design, and production assistance on Tanzia.

In addition to this work, Saunders served as Creative Director at Alelo, where he led the development of an award-winning language-learning RPG. Saunders also authored a college text on game interface design (Game Development Essentials: Game Interface Design). He served as the principal NLP designer at Embodied, the company behind the children's social robot Moxie. In 2019, he co‑founded Digimancy Entertainment, an independent studio dedicated to narrative‑driven RPGs and hybrid RPG titles
