= Fallout 3 =

2008 video game

- Developer: Bethesda Game Studios
- Publisher: Bethesda Softworks
- Director: Todd Howard
- Producers: Ashley Cheng; Gavin Carter
- Designer: Emil Pagliarulo
- Programmers: Guy Carver; Steve Meister
- Artist: Istvan Pely
- Writer: Emil Pagliarulo
- Composer: Inon Zur
- Series: Fallout
- Engine: Gamebryo
- Platforms: Microsoft Windows; PlayStation 3; Xbox 360
- Release: NA: October 28, 2008; PAL: October 31, 2008
- Genres: Action role-playing, first-person shooter
- Mode: Single-player

Fallout 3 is a 2008 action role-playing game developed by Bethesda Game Studios and published by Bethesda Softworks. The game, which was released for Microsoft Windows, PlayStation 3, and Xbox 360, is set in the Washington metropolitan area 200 years after a devastating nuclear war. The player controls a 19-year-old character who leaves a fallout shelter in search of their missing father. Fallout 3 features a freely explorable open world, and the player can engage in combat with a variety of weapons. The player can also initiate conversations with non-player characters, and depending on their actions, can affect how other characters perceive them.

The third major installment in the Fallout series, it is the first game to be developed by Bethesda after acquiring the rights to the franchise from Interplay Entertainment. Lead designer and writer Emil Pagliarulo favored an oppressive and bleak atmosphere, and took inspiration from the dialogue in the first Fallout game. Executive producer Todd Howard wanted the combat to be a mix of real-time and turn-based combat, so that it would appeal to both first-person shooter fans and role-playing game fans. Bethesda chose the Washington metropolitan area as the setting, as the studio was based in Rockville, Maryland, a city close to Washington, D.C.

Fallout 3 received a number of Game of the Year awards and is considered one of the best video games ever made. Critics praised Fallout 3's open-ended gameplay and flexible character-leveling system, and the game shipped almost five million copies in its first week. It received post-launch support, with Bethesda releasing five downloadable add-ons. The game was met with controversy in multiple countries: Australia's classification office initially refused the game over the recreational drug use and the ability to be addicted to alcohol and other drugs; players in India expressed cultural and religious sentiments over the mutated cattle in the game being called Brahmin, a varna (class) in Hinduism; and in the Japanese version, a questline involving the potential detonation of a nuclear bomb in a prominent town was heavily altered before release. The game was followed by a spin-off, Fallout: New Vegas, developed by Obsidian Entertainment in 2010. The fourth major installment in the Fallout series, Fallout 4, was released in 2015.

== Gameplay ==
Fallout 3 is an action role-playing game that can be played from either a first-person or third-person perspective. It is set in the Washington metropolitan area, years after a nuclear war left much of the United States destroyed. The player controls a 19-year-old character who grew up in a fallout shelter called Vault 101. The goal of the game is to complete a series of quests to find the character's father, who unexpectedly left Vault 101. In addition to the main quests, the player can participate in optional unrelated quests known as side quests. GamesRadar+ critic Andy Kelly estimates there are over 100 hours of content in Fallout 3.

At the beginning of the game, the player can customize their character's physical appearance by choosing their gender and race. They can then allocate points into seven primary attributes: strength, perception, endurance, charisma, intelligence, agility, and luck. These attributes are known as "S.P.E.C.I.A.L." stats, and range from 1 to 10. Additionally, there are 13 secondary attributes whose point totals are affected by S.P.E.C.I.A.L. stats: barter, big guns, energy weapons, explosives, lockpick, medicine, melee weapons, repair, science, small guns, sneak, speech, and unarmed. If the player has a high charisma stat for example, then they will be more proficient with the barter and speech skills at the beginning of the game. The player can add more points into skill stats whenever they earn enough experience points to level up. Experience points can be earned through several methods, such as killing an enemy or completing a quest. When the player reaches a new level, they can select a perk, which is a permanent beneficial upgrade. For example, the perk 'Master Trader" reduces the price of items sold by vendors by 25 percent.

While in combat, the player can use V.A.T.S. to pause the game and target specific body parts of an enemy.

Fallout 3 features an open world map that the player can freely explore. Locations the player can discover range from small settlements and abandoned buildings, to larger locations like the Jefferson Memorial and the Washington Monument. The player is equipped with a wearable computer called the Pip-Boy 3000. The device serves as a menu, and allows the player to access items they have acquired; view detailed character statistics and active quests; and look at the map, which can be used to fast travel to previously discovered locations. The player can also utilize the Pip-Boy as a radio, letting them to listen to songs from the 1940s and 1950s on makeshift radio broadcasts. While exploring, the player can recruit certain non-playable characters as companions, who will accompany the player and assist them in combat. There are a variety of weapons in the game, including standard guns, energy-based guns, melee weapons, and explosives. While in combat, the player can utilize a gameplay mechanic known as V.A.T.S., which pauses the game and allows the player to target specific body parts of an enemy. V.A.T.S. is dictated by a statistic known as Action Points. Each attack while in V.A.T.S. costs Action Points, and when the player runs out of Action Points they must wait a short period of time before they can use it again.

An important mechanic in Fallout 3 is the player's karma. Whenever the player commits an action that is deemed either good or bad, their karma will change accordingly. For example, if the player provides water to a beggar, their karma increases. Likewise, if the player breaks into a home, their karma decreases. The player's karma affects how other characters perceive them. Certain companions can only be recruited if the player meets the companion's karmic expectation. Some non-recruitable characters will be more accepting of the player depending on their karma level, such as slavers, who will be more accepting to players with negative karma and provide services that would not be available to players with neutral or positive karma.

== Plot ==
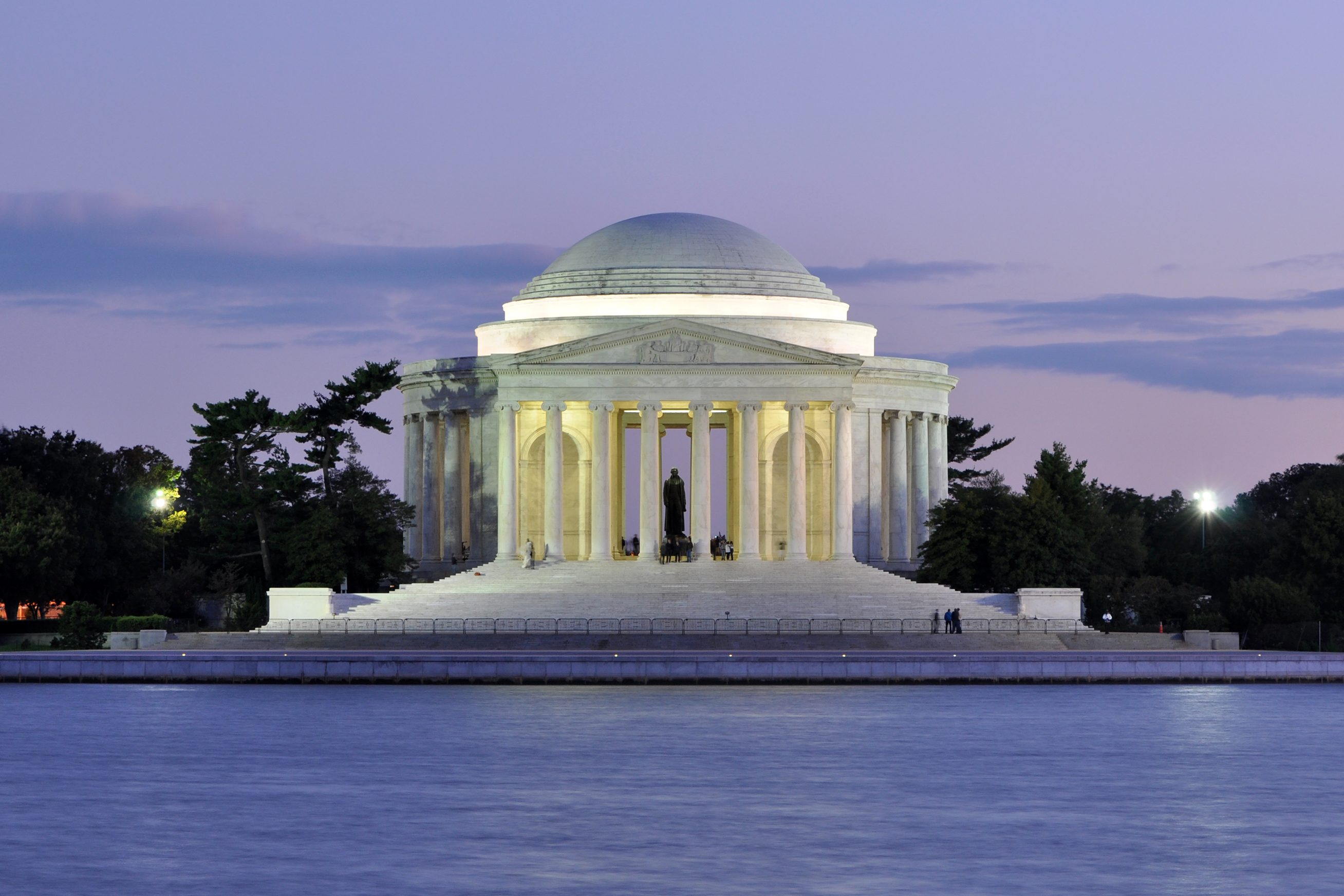
The plot of Fallout 3 revolves around a water purifier at the Jefferson Memorial.

Fallout 3 takes place in the year 2277, 200 years after a nuclear war that destroyed most of the United States. Some survivors of the war took refuge in high-tech fallout shelters known as Vaults. The player character, nicknamed the Lone Wanderer, grew up in Vault 101, located near Washington, D.C.. After the Lone Wanderer's 19th birthday, their father, a scientist named James (Liam Neeson), leaves the Vault without explanation. The young vault dweller decides to track him down and journeys the region in and around D.C., now known as the Capital Wasteland. Along the way, the Lone Wanderer learns about their father's background from other characters, including Megaton resident Colin Moriarty (Mike Rosson), Galaxy News Radio DJ Three Dog (Erik Dellums), and Rivet City scientist Dr. Madison Li (Jennifer Massey). Before the Lone Wanderer's birth, James and his wife Catherine had been working on Project Purity, in which a water purifier built in the Jefferson Memorial would have purified the irradiated water in the Tidal Basin and Potomac River. However, after Catherine died during childbirth, James abandoned the project to raise his child in Vault 101.

The Lone Wanderer finds and rescues James from a virtual reality program run by overseer Stanislaus Braun (Dee Bradley Baker) in Vault 112. James reveals that he wanted to revive Project Purity and left Vault 101 to seek the Garden of Eden Creation Kit (G.E.C.K.), a powerful piece of technology intended to assist in rebuilding civilization after a nuclear war. Work on Project Purity resumes, but the remnants of the United States government, known as the Enclave, storm the memorial and intervene under the command of Colonel Augustus Autumn (Peter Gil). Its leader, President John Henry Eden (Malcolm McDowell), wants to inject the purifier with a deadly virus that will kill any mutated organisms who drink the water, including humans. James sacrifices himself to protect the purifier by flooding the control room with lethal amounts of radiation. The Lone Wanderer and several scientists, including Dr. Li are forced to subsequently escape the memorial through an underground sewer tunnel.

The group travels to the former Pentagon, now called the Citadel, where they recruit the help of the Brotherhood of Steel, a paramilitary organization that protects the residents of the Capital Wasteland. The Lone Wanderer is sent to Vault 87 to find the G.E.C.K., which they successfully retrieve, however, they are captured by Colonel Autumn and taken to Raven Rock. There, the Lone Wanderer meets President Eden, who is revealed to be an advanced artificial intelligence program. Eden gives them a vial containing the virus and asks them to insert it into Project Purity. Afterwards, the Lone Wanderer escapes, optionally causing Eden to self destruct.

Using a massive pre-war military robot called Liberty Prime, the Lone Wanderer and the Brotherhood of Steel march toward the Jefferson Memorial, battling defending Enclave forces in the process. Once inside, the Lone Wanderer confronts Autumn and either kills him or convinces him to flee. They learn the water purifier needs to be manually turned on via the severely irradiated control room, or else it will shortly blow up. The player can either sacrifice themselves to activate the purifier, optionally inserting the virus during the process; instruct Sarah Lyons, a Brotherhood sentinel, to activate it instead; or do nothing and let the purifier explode.

== Development ==
=== Early development and writing ===
The logo for Bethesda Game Studios

The origins of Fallout 3 date back to the cancellation of Van Buren, which was intended to be the third game in the mainline Fallout series. Under the development of Black Isle Studios, Van Buren was to be set in Arizona, Colorado, Nevada, and Utah, and would have included a mixture of real-time and turn-based combat. Because Black Isle Studios' publisher Interplay Entertainment was struggling financially, Van Buren was cancelled in December 2003. In 2004, Bethesda Softworks purchased the rights to develop their own rendition of Fallout 3 from Interplay for $1,175,000 minimum guaranteed advance against royalties. Although Bethesda was well known for their work with The Elder Scrolls series at the time, they wanted to expand their catalogue with another project. According to developer Joel Burgess, Bethesda's holding company ZeniMax Media turned down multiple offers from other companies who wanted to work on the game. Burgess remarked, "The sense was we had to make our own game."

Development on Fallout 3 began in late 2004 with a small team of around 10 people, as most of Bethesda's staff was busy working on The Elder Scrolls IV: Oblivion. After the release of The Elder Scrolls IV: Oblivion in 2006, the size of the team drastically increased. Programmer Jean Simonet estimates that when development concluded, there were around 75 team members. Lead designer and writer Emil Pagliarulo wrote the majority of the main story early in development, and when the team expanded, he allowed other designers to make rewrites and suggestions. This process exemplified Bethesda's decision to foster a more collaborative approach and allow developers to voice their opinions on various aspects of the game. Pagliarulo notes this approach differed from the rigid and "unhealthy" development of The Elder Scrolls IV: Oblivion, in which the developers had to follow the outline of the original design document regardless of their opinions.

In multiple interviews, Bethesda developers noted the difficulty of working on a game from an established series they had no prior connection to. Product manager Pete Hines said Bethesda's mindset was to treat Fallout 3 as if they had worked on the original Fallout games. To this extent, they kept Fallout 3 an in-house production, and did not hire anyone who worked on the original games. Bethesda used the first Fallout game as a model while designing Fallout 3. Pagliarulo favored the oppressive and bleak atmosphere of the first Fallout game in contrast to the excessive and camp dialogue of Fallout 2. Pagliarulo wanted to instill a "rawness" to the dialogue, and included occasional profanity. Another goal was to instill a sense of moral ambiguity whenever the player made an important decision. According to lead producer Gavin Carter, the karma mechanic was designed to let the player know the immediate consequences of their actions, and make the player question whether they made the right choice. The player character's father, James, was created as a moral compass, and would react to the player's previous actions.

=== Gameplay and design ===
A common joke among fans and journalists before the release of Fallout 3 was to describe it as "Oblivion but with guns". Due to Bethesda's previous oeuvre with high fantasy role-playing games, some players questioned whether Fallout 3 would simply be an iteration of The Elder Scrolls IV: Oblivion. Bethesda sought to incorporate elements of first-person shooter games, while also allowing players to approach combat with a more tactical nuance commonly found in role-playing games. Executive producer Todd Howard wanted the combat to be a mix of real-time and turn-based combat, which led to the creation of the V.A.T.S. system. Howard emphasized "cinematic" combat, and Simonet accomplished this goal by adding slow-motion effects whenever the player used V.A.T.S. The inspiration for the slow motion effects while in V.A.T.S. came from the slow motion replays of car crashes from the Burnout series. Bethesda developers later discussed how they felt the shooting mechanics in Fallout 3 were one of the weaker elements of the game. Burgess remarked, "We didn't really have first-person shooter experts, we didn't really know ... If nothing else, it speaks to some of the ways we were successful that the mediocrity of the shooting didn't matter."

The original setting for Fallout 3 was the West Coast of the United States, but early in development, the setting changed to the Washington metropolitan area. Pagliarulo said this decision stemmed from the adage "write what you know", as Bethesda was based in Rockville, Maryland, a city close to Washington, D.C. Burgess wanted Washington, D.C. to be a difficult location to explore, with harder enemies and more radiation. Due to how the game engine worked, Washington, D.C. needed to be split into separate zones connected by the Washington Metro. Playtesters routinely struggled to navigate the Metro, and complained the increased difficulty made the area less enjoyable. Bethesda attempted to remove the dividers separating the zones, but Burgess said the initial test did not show promise, and the idea was dropped. Burgess claims a proper test could have yielded a different result, and describes the entire Washington, D.C. area as "the big mistake I feel I made on [Fallout 3]".

The original size of the Fallout 3 map was comparable to the size of the map in The Elder Scrolls IV: Oblivion. Bethesda incorporated various monuments from the Washington metropolitan area that would serve as visual landmarks to help the player navigate. For example, when the player leaves Vault 101 at the beginning of the game, they see the Washington Monument in the distance, which was meant to help the player determine where Washington, D.C. was in relation to Vault 101. About six months before release, Bethesda felt the map was too small. Whereas The Elder Scrolls IV: Oblivion was able to hide the distance between locations with mountains and trees, Fallout 3's barren wasteland setting meant that players were noticing locations too quickly. As a result, Bethesda spread out locations and increased the map size by roughly 20 percent. Another map related issue brought up late in development was the fact that no one had modeled the White House. As there was not enough time to create another significant location on the map, the decision was made to instead display the remnants of the White House amidst a giant crater and explain that it was one of the locations targeted by nuclear attacks. Bethesda spread out enemy encounters so as to not inundate the player with excessive combat. In an attempt to keep the map unpredictable, they added random encounters the player can witness such as a group of contract killers attacking a character or a giant scorpion attacking a robot.

=== Audio ===
Inon Zur composed the score for Fallout 3, which was intended to balance traditional American music like blues and folk, with the powerful cadence of military music. The goal was to showcase American life before the nuclear war while simultaneously emphasizing the theme of militant progress. Zur was influenced by post-apocalyptic films like Mad Max 2 as well as Vietnam War films like Full Metal Jacket. The music is fully electronic, with occasional samples of live instruments. When asked about the music, Zur said, "I wanted to create something that almost [sounds as if it] comes out of a boom box, rather than something that feels symphonic and heroic. Because all of the technology is sort of low-tech in Fallout, then the actual sound is representing and helping to represent this aspect, too." In addition to the original soundtrack, Fallout 3 features licensed music that the player can listen to via in-game radio stations. The licensed music includes songs from artists such as Roy Brown, Billie Holiday, Billy Munn, Cole Porter, and Bob Crosby.

Over 40,000 lines of dialogue were recorded for Fallout 3, which at the time, set a Guinness World Record for the most lines of dialogue in a single-player role-playing game. Some celebrity actors were brought on to provide voice work, including Liam Neeson and Malcolm McDowell. Ron Perlman reprises his role as the narrator. In an interview with Edge, Blindlight manager Lev Chapelsky noted that former president of the United States Bill Clinton was jokingly offered a voice role, but the offer was swiftly rejected. Hines later noted that even if Clinton had agreed, Bethesda would have not allowed him to provide voice work. Hines said, "In no way, shape or form, did we say President Clinton is who we want for this role or [tell Blindlight to] go chase him."

== Release ==
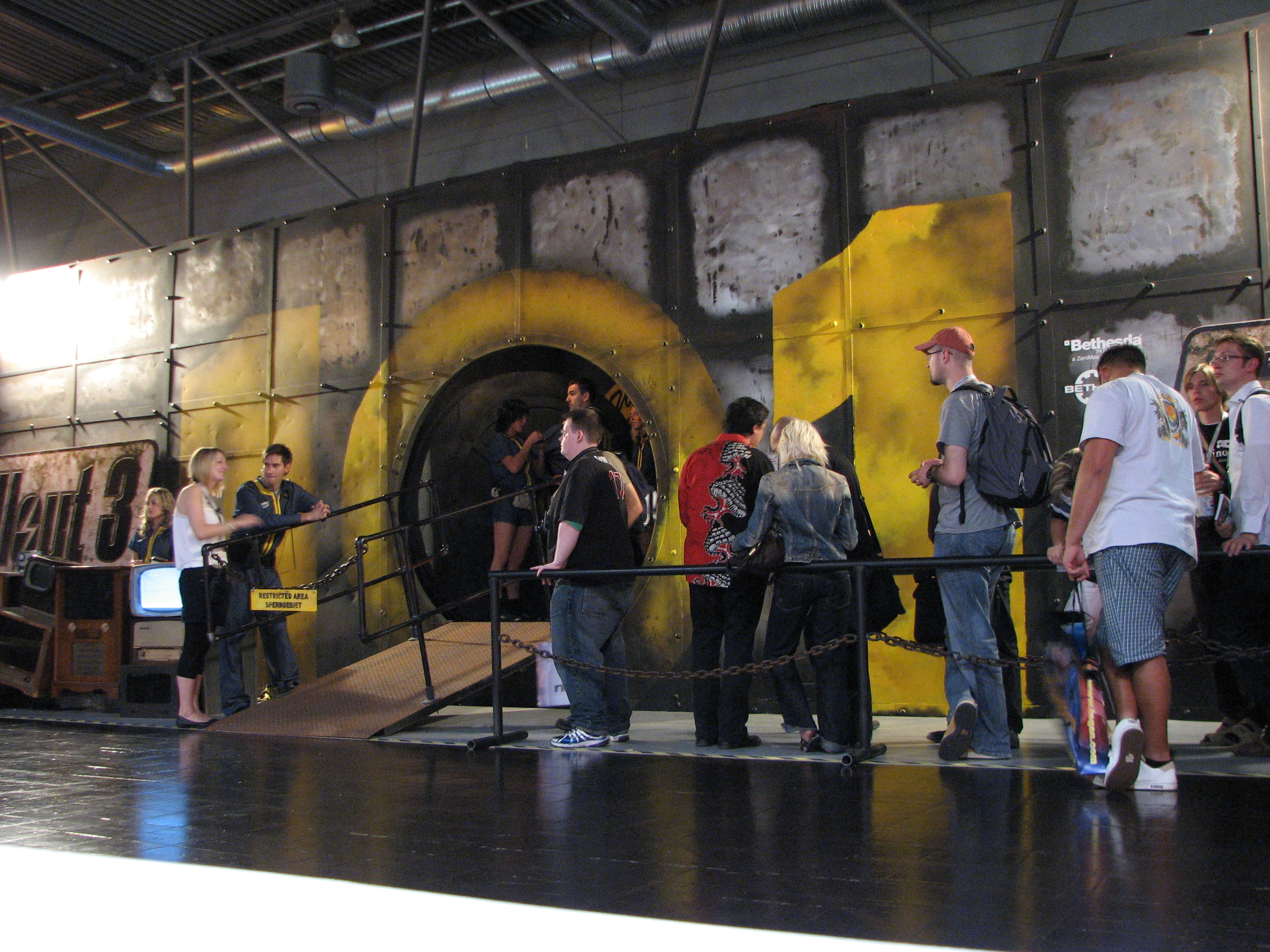
Bethesda's Fallout 3 booth at the 2008 Games Convention

Fallout 3 was announced in July 2004, when Bethesda purchased the rights to the game from Interplay. For years, there was little new information about the game, although Tor Thorsen of GameSpot notes that interest in Fallout 3 rose significantly after the critical success of The Elder Scrolls IV: Oblivion. In April 2007, Bethesda published a teaser site for Fallout 3, and in June released the first trailer. The trailer zooms out from inside a bus to show the ruins of Washington, D.C., accompanied by the song "I Don't Want to Set the World on Fire" by the Ink Spots. To promote the game, Bethesda partnered with American Cinematheque and Geek Monthly to hold a film festival titled A Post-Apocalyptic Film Festival Presented by Fallout 3. The festival showcased six post-apocalyptic films: 12 Monkeys, A Boy and His Dog, Damnation Alley, The Last Man on Earth, The Omega Man, and Wizards. The game had a marketing budget of $13 million.

Fallout 3 was released for Microsoft Windows, PlayStation 3, and Xbox 360 on October 28, 2008, in North America, October 30 in Europe and Australia, and December 4 in Japan. In its first week of release, Fallout 3 had sold 4.7 million copies worldwide, and grossed $300 million. Fallout 3 outsold every previous Fallout game combined, and sales were 57% stronger than The Elder Scrolls IV: Oblivion in its first week of release. The market research firm Electronic Entertainment Design and Research estimated that by 2015, the game had sold 12.4 million copies worldwide.

Due to its content, some versions of Fallout 3 were subject to censorship. The initial Australian version was refused classification by the Australian Classification Board (ACB) due to its realistic depiction of drug use. As it is illegal to distribute or purchase an Australian game without an ACB classification, Bethesda replaced all instances of the drug morphine with a generic drug, and removed the drug injection animation. Bethesda further altered every version of Fallout 3 to accommodate for these changes. Another version of the game subject to censorship was the Japanese version, due to its depiction of nuclear weaponry. A quest that allowed the player to either defuse or detonate a nuclear warhead was altered so that it was impossible to detonate it, and the name of a weapon was changed. Excess blood and gore were removed from the German version by the Federal Department for Media Harmful to Young Persons, and Microsoft chose not to release Fallout 3 in India due to perceived "cultural sensitivities". (Note: One journalist speculated the decision to not release Fallout 3 in India was due to the game's depiction of Brahman cattle. In Hinduism, cows are revered, and the similarly named concepts of Brahman and Brahmin are of great importance in Hindu society.)

In 2023, a leaked financial forecast presentation indicated that Bethesda was working on a remaster of Fallout 3. The presentation stated that the remaster was scheduled for a 2024 release, although PC Gamer notes that the release projection predated the COVID-19 pandemic, which has likely delayed development. Interest has increased since the release of The Elder Scrolls IV: Oblivion Remastered, with increased demand for content reflecting later Fallout games like New Vegas, such as playable factions and reputation scores. In 2026, Bethesda announced remasters of New Vegas and Fallout 3 were in development.

=== Downloadable content ===
Fallout 3 was supported with five downloadable content (DLC) add-ons. The first DLC was Operation: Anchorage, which takes place inside a virtual reality simulation that depicts a battle between United States and Chinese soldiers in Anchorage, Alaska. The second DLC was The Pitt. Set in Pittsburgh, the player infiltrates a slaver compound, and looks for a cure for the mutant disease affecting the slave population. The third DLC, Broken Steel, takes place immediately after the events of main story, and revolves around the Brotherhood of Steel's campaign to eliminate the remaining Enclave soldiers. The fourth DLC, Point Lookout, is set in Point Lookout State Park, where the player investigates the disappearance of a young girl. In the final DLC, Mothership Zeta, the player is abducted by aliens and must escape from a UFO.

Development on the DLC add-ons began roughly two months before Fallout 3's release. Only three add-ons were initially planned, but due to player feedback, the number was increased to five. Initially, the DLC add-ons were not released for the PlayStation 3 version. Lazard Capital Markets analyst Colin Sebastian speculated that this was likely the result of a deal with Bethesda by Sony's competitor, Microsoft. Howard offered a different explanation and said it was due to more Xbox 360 owners paying for The Elder Scrolls IV: Oblivion DLC than PlayStation 3 owners. By 2009, all five add-ons were made available to PlayStation 3 owners.

== Reception ==
=== Reviews ===
Fallout 3

Aggregate score
Aggregator	Score
Metacritic	91/100 (PC); 90/100 (PS3); 93/100 (X360)

Review scores
Publication	Score
Edge	7/10
Electronic Gaming Monthly	A, B+, A+ (Note: Electronic Gaming Monthly would sometimes have three critics review a game, and display the individual ratings from each critic. Demian Linn gave an A score, Theirry Nguyen game a B+ score, and Philip Kollar gave an A+ score.)
Eurogamer	10/10
Game Informer	9.5/10
GameSpot	9/10
GameSpy	5/5
GamesRadar+	4.5/5
IGN	9.6/10
Official Xbox Magazine (US)	10/10
PC Gamer (US)	91/100

Fallout 3 was well received by critics. On the review aggregator website Metacritic, the Microsoft Windows version of Fallout 3 was assigned the game a weighted average critic score of 91/100, the PlayStation 3 version a 90/100, and the Xbox 360 version a 93/100. The Xbox 360 version is tied with Braid, Gears of War 2, and Super Smash Bros. Brawl as the fourth highest rated game from 2008 on Metacritic.

1UP.com's Demian Linn praised its open-ended gameplay and flexible character-leveling system. While the V.A.T.S. system was called fun, enemy encounters were said to suffer from a lack of precision in real-time combat and little variety in enemy types. The review concluded, Fallout 3 is a "hugely ambitious game that doesn't come around very often." IGN editor Erik Brudvig praised the game's "minimalist" sound design, observing how "you might find yourself with nothing but the sound of wind rustling through decaying trees and blowing dust across the barren plains ... Fallout 3 proves that less can be more." The review noted that the "unusual amount of realism" combined with the "endless conversation permutations" produces "one of the most truly interactive experiences of the generation." In a review of the game for Kotaku, Mike Fahey commented: "While Inon Zur's score is filled with epic goodness, the real stars of Fallout 3's music are the vintage songs from the 1940s."

Tim Cain, Fallout and Fallout 2 game director, praised the art direction and the attention to details but did not like the way the endings were not enough constructed around player's actions and decisions. He was also critical of how Fallout 3 recycled plot elements from the first two games, such as Super Mutants and the Enclave, saying that if his company, Troika Games, had acquired the license, he would have come up with a completely original story for the East coast. Chris Avellone, Fallout 2's main writer, described the game as having "enough options and tools at [his] disposal to insure [sic] [he] was having fun no matter what the challenges." Praising the immersion in Fallout's world, the success in carrying on the legacy of the previous two games, and the fulfilling open-world component, he criticized the writing of some characters and some of gameplay's choices in balancing the skills of the player character. Will Tuttle of GameSpy commended the game for its "engaging storyline, impeccable presentation, and hundreds of hours of addictive gameplay." Although Edge awarded the game 7 out of 10, in a later anniversary issue it placed the game 37th in a "100 best games to play today" list, saying "Fallout 3 empowers, engages and rewards to extents that few games have ever achieved."

Some criticisms concerned the bugs in regards to the physics and crashes, some of which broke quests and prevented progression. The AI and stiff character animations are another common point of criticism, as is the ending. Edge stated that "the game is cumbersome in design and frequently incompetent in the details of execution", taking particular issue with the nakedness of the HUD, the clarity of the menu interface, and that the smaller problems are carried over from Oblivion. Edge liked the central story but said "the writing isn't quite as consistent as the ideas that underpin" and that the "voice-acting is even less reliable."

=== Fandom response ===
It's not a Fallout game. It's not even a game inspired by Fallout, as I had hoped. It's a game that contains a loose assortment of familiar Fallout concepts and names ... Electricity, pre-war electronic equipment, powered and still working computers (just think about that for a second), working cola & snack machines, weapons, ammo, scrap metal (needed by many), and even unlooted first aid boxes are everywhere.

— Vince D. Weller, long-time No Mutants Allowed member, former RPG news site director, and lead developer of The Age of Decadence

Not all fans were happy with the direction the Fallout series was taken in after its acquisition by Bethesda. Notorious for their support of the series' first two games, Fallout and Fallout 2, members centered on one of the oldest Fallout fansites, No Mutants Allowed, have criticized departures from the original games' stories, gameplay mechanics and setting. Criticisms include the prevalence of unspoiled food after 200 years, the survival of wood-framed dwellings following a nuclear blast, and the ubiquity of Super Mutants at early levels in the game. Also criticized are the quality of the game's writing, its relative lack of verisimilitude, the switch to a first-person action game format, and the level of reactiveness of the surrounding game world to player actions. In response, James Stephanie Sterling of Destructoid called fan groups like No Mutants Allowed "selfish" and "arrogant", stating that a new audience deserves a chance to play a Fallout game; and that if the series had stayed the way it was back in 1997, new titles would never have been made and brought to market. Luke Winkie of Kotaku tempers these sentiments, saying that it is a matter of ownership; and that in the case of Fallout 3, hardcore fans of the original series witnessed their favorite games become transformed into something else.

=== Awards ===
After its release, Fallout 3 won numerous awards from gaming journalists and websites. It was awarded Game of the Year by Gamasutra, GamesRadar+, GameSpy, IGN, and UGO Networks. (Note: Attributed to multiple sources: Gamasutra; GamesRadar+; GameSpy; IGN; UGO Networks) The game also won Xbox 360 Game of the Year from GameSpy, IGN, and Official Xbox Magazine, and PC Game of the Year from GamePro, GameSpy, GameSpot, and GameTrailers. (Note: Attributed to multiple sources: Official Xbox Magazine Xbox 360; GameSpy Xbox 360; IGN Xbox 360; GamePro PC; GameSpy PC; GameSpot PC; GameTrailers PC) At the 2009 Golden Joystick Awards, Fallout 3 won Ultimate Game of the Year. It also won Game of the Year along with Best Writing at the Game Developers Choice Awards. During the 12th Annual Interactive Achievement Awards, the Academy of Interactive Arts & Sciences awarded Fallout 3 with Role-Playing Game of the Year and Outstanding Achievement in Original Story, and nominated it for Overall Game of the Year, Computer Game of the Year, Console Game of the Year, Outstanding Achievement in Game Direction, Outstanding Achievement in Game Design, and Outstanding Achievement in Gameplay Engineering.

== Legacy ==
Some critics have referred to Fallout 3 as one of the best games in the Fallout series, (Note: Attributed to multiple references:) and as one of the greatest games of all time. (Note: Attributed to multiple references:) It is also considered one of the defining games of the seventh generation of video game consoles, which generally encompasses the years 2005 to 2013. Fallout 3 was included in The Art of Video Games exhibit at Smithsonian American Art Museum, where it was described as the defining adventure game for current computers. In an article about the seventh generation of video game consoles, Eurogamer's Will Porter described Fallout 3 as "a perfect meld of the old and the new ... The way Fallout 3 strode out, blinked beneath an unfamiliar sun and went on to thrive, genuinely made it one of the greatest experiences of this generation." IGN gave similar commentary and stated, "It's a truly special western role-playing game, one with a deep, post-apocalyptic plot, memorable characters, and an emphasis on choice".

Fallout 3's open world map is often cited as the game's greatest achievement. Its portrayal of 1950s American culture contrasted by the devastation of nuclear war helped Fallout 3 stand apart from contemporary high fantasy role-playing games like The Elder Scrolls and Gothic. Journalists have also noted how the map emphasized exploration and allowed players to find unique side quests and scenes of environmental storytelling. Khee Hoon Chan of Rock Paper Shotgun remarked, "The Fallout 3 world is probably better traversed when you abandon all pretense of trying to find your father, and wander about the endless wilderness as a roaming wayfarer, discovering these vignettes of humanity's perseverance after a global catastrophe." Jeremy Peel of PCGamesN argues that Fallout 3's depiction of Washington, D.C. revolutionized video game exploration due to its non-linear design. Peel wrote, "Part of Fallout 3's legacy lies in setting the concept of a videogame dungeon free. Bethesda's D.C. allows you to approach its dangers from different directions, in different orders, and still find a satisfying loop you can recognize as dungeon-spelunking."

In the years since its release, the initial overwhelming praise bestowed on Fallout 3 has somewhat subsided. Retrospective commentary surrounding Fallout 3 often focuses on the writing, which some players and journalists have bemoaned for the lack of choices the player can make to affect the story and unrealistic character decisions. For example, at the end of the game when the player can choose to sacrifice themselves to activate the purifier, they are unable to ask a companion to do it instead, even if the companion is immune to radiation. Fallout 3's successor, Fallout: New Vegas, introduced multiple questlines the player can follow to complete the game and replaced the karma system with reputation among specific factions. Due to its expanded role-playing mechanics, some players and journalists not only favor Fallout: New Vegas but also deride Fallout 3 in comparison. In response to the backlash, journalist Jade King wrote, "It feels elitist to suddenly pigeonhole it as some sort of failure ... Back in 2008, Fallout 3 set a new benchmark for what open world [role-playing games] were capable of. We view it with such derision in hindsight, because Bethesda never really moved on from it."

Fallout 3 brought the Fallout series into the mainstream. Billy Studholme of The Washington Post wrote, "Before Fallout 3, there was no Fallout as we know it today. The game blew the hinges off the franchise in the best way." Due to the tepid reception toward the spin-off games Fallout Tactics: Brotherhood of Steel and Fallout: Brotherhood of Steel, and the cancellation of the Van Buren project, the series stagnated in the mid-2000s. Bethesda's decision to swap the isometric graphics of the older games with 3D graphics as well as release the game on consoles helped Fallout 3 reach a wider audience. Maxwell McGee of GamesRadar+ also notes that Bethesda made Fallout 3 more accessible to new players. McGee stated, "It's a guided experience that expertly introduces the Fallout universe without leaving you lost in the wasteland."
