= Vault 112 =

Video game location

- Fallout location
- The Tranquility Loungers area inside Vault 112 as it appears in Fallout 3
- First appearance: Fallout 3 (2008)
- Genre: Action role-playing game

In-universe information
- Location: Washington, D.C., United States (Fallout)

Vault 112 is a fictional underground fallout shelter in the 2008 action role-playing game Fallout 3, created as part of the Fallout franchise by Bethesda Game Studios. Located in the Capital Wasteland setting (or an irradiated Washington, D.C. area), it is a location that the player character, the Lone Wanderer, must visit so that they can catch up to and rescue the character's father James as part of the game's main quest. It is hidden within an abandoned location called Smith Casey's garage. The vault has a relatively simple design, its central element being the multiple egg-shaped pods called Tranquility Loungers, most of which host the longtime vault residents and James in an immersive virtual reality program. In the game's lore, the vault overseer and a director of the Vault-Tec Corporation, Stanislaus Braun, oversaw the vault's virtual program experiment, exploiting it by repeatedly tormenting and killing the vault residents virtually and erasing their memories for about 200 years due to his endless sadism.

Upon entrance to one of the capsules, the Lone Wanderer is taken to a virtual world called Tranquility Lane, a 1950s-themed American dead-end street neighborhood filled with mostly unaware residents; using an avatar of a young girl named Betty, Braun takes interest in the player character and asks them to exploit the test subjects to his liking. The Lone Wanderer can choose to either follow his orders and eventually kill all the residents virtually for fun or, with hints from a self-aware woman named T. "Old Lady" Dithers, activate a program from a failsafe terminal in which AI-controlled Chinese soldiers kill them both virtually and in real life. Regardless of the path chosen, Braun will allow them and their father to exit out of the virtual reality programs and therefore the vault itself. Emil Pagliarulo, the lead designer of Fallout 3, explained that the Betty avatar and Braun's personality within it were inspired by The Twilight Zone episode "It's a Good Life", which involves an extraordinarily powerful boy who consolidates power over the residents of an isolated town with cruelty.

Vault 112 and its Tranquility Lane program have received positive attention for their dark and unsettling but sometimes humorous storyline, with writers calling the questline one of the most memorable moments of the game. They have also been the subject of multiple scholarly analyses, which highlight their relation to the lack of safety and ethics behind the preservation and torment of residents under Braun, the player's level of agency within the virtual world, and potential motives and reactions that they have within it.

== Appearance and development ==
=== Vault 112 ===
Fallout 3 concept art of the interiors of Vault 112 by Adam Adamowicz. Its Tranquility Lane program, as seen ingame and in the concept art, is fueled by a geothermal source and maintained by Robobrain robots.

Vault 112, located at the Washington, D.C. area, is a vault produced by the Vault-Tec Corporation that appears in the 2008 action role-playing game Fallout 3, developed by Bethesda Game Studios as part of the Fallout franchise. Fallout 3, as with the Fallout game series' other entries, depicts an alternate history in which the United States is obliterated by a nuclear war in 2077 after major global crises, leaving few survivors. A majority of the survivors were protected by the impacts of the nuclear warfare by vaults that were built by Vault-Tec, among them Vault 112. The United States' capital itself (referred to as the "Capital Wasteland") had been in complete ruins for hundreds of years since the "Great War of 2077," being filled with radiation, toxicity, and hostile enemies. Vault 112, among other vaults, were supposed to receive a Garden of Eden Creation Kit (G.E.C.K.) to terraform wastelands and purify water in post-war life.

In Fallout 3, a couple named James and Catherine were scientists of the Capital Wasteland affiliated with the Brotherhood of Steel in creating a water purification project for the Capital Wasteland called "Project Purity," meant to provide radiation-free water for the area's residents. In 2258, Catherine gave birth to a child canonically referred to as the "Lone Wanderer" (the player character) but died shortly after. This caused James to abandon Project Purity and take his child with him to live in Vault 101, striking a deal with the overseer to become the vault's resident doctor. In 2277, James rushes out of Vault 101 into the Capital Wasteland with the intention of completing Project Purity, with the player character exiting as well in search of him.

As part of the game's main quest, the player character has to search for their father's whereabouts in the Capital Wasteland. Upon exploring the Jefferson Memorial, they find a journal entry called "Entry 10," which reveals that James headed to a fallout shelter location called Vault 112. To access it, the Lone Wanderer heads to an abandoned car garage location called Smith Casey's garage. Upon flipping a switch, an entrance to a short tunnel route from the workshop area with a staircase opens. From there, the player character descends to Vault 112's security door. Unlike with the garage filled with giant, irradiated radroaches and mole rats, Vault 112 has no enemies. Upon entrance to the interiors of Vault 112, a friendly robot called a Robobrain will greet the player, stating that they are "202.3 years behind schedule" at arrival and giving them a Vault 112 suit, then asking the player to access their "assigned Tranquility Lounger" downstairs at the main floor. The vault's main area is a circular area at the center containing the "Tranquility Lounger" machines, most occupied by individuals and one of which is empty and accessible for the Lone Wanderer to enter and activate. The Tranquility Loungers are egg-shaped pods with glass and metal structures designed for virtual reality simulations under the overseer. Among the few other rooms of the simple-designed vault are two medical treatment rooms, a storage room, and an office room revealing that the vault's overseer is a scientist named Stanislaus Braun.

In the game's lore, Stanislaus Braun is a former leading scientist of the Vault-Tec Corporation who invented the G.E.C.K. device before the Great War of 2077. After Vault-Tec began construction of Vault 112 in 2068 and completed it in 2074, it assigned Braun as the vault's overseer and sole administrator. At the time, he was the Director of Vault-Tec’s Societal Preservation Program, designing the social experiments for each of the individual vaults including those in Fallout 3. His interest in the creation of virtual reality programs led to his interest in Vault 112's experiment of such. Fueled by geothermal energy and tended by the caretaking Robobrains, the special stasis pods of the vault kept the residing individuals alive and kept track of both their stress levels and vital signs. The vault was originally built to house 85 residents. As the experiment intended, Braun ran simulated worlds for the residents in the pods through virtual reality, occupying them with more "perfect" realities to distract them from the stressful realities of living in the vault and the outside world. However, the vault residents were unable to ever exit from the pods and their programs. Braun, growing bored of the simulated utopias, started killing off the vault residents in the simulations, mentally resurrecting them but also wiping their memories to ensure that none of them could remember his actions. Thus, he changed the simulated worlds and repeatedly killed the vault residents there. In his terminal entries, he wrote about some of the simulations like "Toucan Lagoon" in which the residents were consumed by sharks and "Slalom Chalet" where the residents were placed in icy land.

=== Tranquility Lane ===
The simulated world of Tranquility Lane, a 1950s-themed American pre-war neighborhood, as it appears ingame

Since James entered one of the pods to talk to Braun, the Lone Wanderer enters one of them to get to their father. After a computer screen at the pod exposes them to the "PLEASE STAND BY" loading screen like that ingame, the player character is transported through a simulated sepia-colored street called Tranquility Lane. The current simulated setting in question is of a 1950s-themed American dead-end street neighborhood with identical houses and no way out. Cheerful television-themed music plays in the area and loops endlessly. As part of the simulation, the player character is turned into a young child and their Pip-Boy is replaced with the wristwatch, limiting their abilities; any companion the player brought with them will not be there. As intended by Braun, most of the vault residents turned neighborhood residents are blissfully unaware of the world being a simulation. In the middle of the neighborhood is a young girl named Betty and a dog, the former of whom the Lone Wanderer can engage with for instructions on what to do. Any attempt from the player to harm Betty will result in them being killed, thus restarting to the last save. The player can resolve the questline through two paths: the "good karma" route and the "evil karma" route, named in reference to the changes in the karma stat that the player has in either one.

In the "evil karma" route, Betty will assign the Lone Wanderer a series of negative actions that escalate. She first has them make a little boy named Timmy Neusbaum cry, which can be done by different actions namely by punching him, showing him a military brochure and telling him that he will have to attend it, telling him that his parents are getting divorced, or by killing his parents. Betty will then task the player character to break up the marriage of Mr. and Mrs. Rockwell, which again can be achieved through multiple actions like informing Mrs. Rockwell that her husband is cheating on her or that he killed their neighbor after the Lone Wanderer had already done so to frame him. The Lone Wanderer's third task is to then kill Mabel Henderson in a specifically "creative way"; possible options include dropping a chandelier on her, planting a roller skate near the stairs so that she can trip to her death, setting her oven to explode on her, or hacking a security terminal so that her robot kills her. Betty finally then assigns the Lone Wanderer the final task to equip a clown mask and butcher knife from a doghouse and roleplay as the "Pint-Sized Slasher", killing everyone else in the neighborhood. Afterward, Braun voices delight and asks the Lone Wanderer if they had fun.

Alternatively, the player can pursue the "good karma" route by talking to T. "Old Lady" Dithers. Dithers is one of the vault residents who at some point retained partial awareness of Braun's activities but had her concerns dismissed by the other residents who did not retain their memories. She tells the player that she believes that the "dream" had become a "nightmare" and therefore has to come to an end for her and the others but that Braun would not let that happen. Of note is that if the player had checked her vital signs before the simulation entrance, the terminal reveals that her vitals have an anomaly and that her stress level is exceptionally high. Old Lady Dithers then tells the Lone Wanderer about a terminal in an abandoned house that no one had yet used. After solving a musical puzzle there, the player can access a hidden terminal and activate the "Chinese Invasion" program in reference to the prewar hostilities between the US and China. The AI-operated Chinese Red Army then guns down and permanently kills everyone in the neighborhood except for "Betty", the dog, and the Lone Wanderer to Braun's anger. In a terminal entry, Braun installed the program to ensure that the "test subjects" of Vault 112 who are killed by the program die in the real world. However, he noted that he later thought about how he had no way to deactivate the simulation for himself but also developed sadistic pleasures of killing the vault residents in it, not finding AI alternatives to be satisfying and therefore fearing eternal boredom and solitude.

In either case, "Betty" will reveal "herself" to be an avatar of Braun (evident by his avatar's voice changes between that of a young girl and Braun's true voice of an old man with a German accent) and the dog as that of James then allow both to leave the simulation through a glitchy door and therefore the pods. Afterward, James and the Lone Wanderer are able to leave the simulation and the vault itself, continuing with the main quest.

=== Development information ===
In a 2008 interview with 1Up Network, Fallout 3 lead designer Emil Pagliarulo said that the Tranquility Lane world was intended to showcase the United States setting before the bombs fell. He also revealed that the Betty avatar is a reference to "It's a Good Life", an episode of the television series The Twilight Zone in which a little boy uses his godlike powers to terrorize the isolated town's inhabitants to his will and sends any of them into a cornfield if he feels displeased with them. Pagliarulo also stated that he was unsure of where he got the "Pint-Sized Slasher" idea from other than that some dark influence in his mind convinced him that it would be a fun idea. Later in a 2020 livestream chat interview with Pagliarulo, Bethesda's lead producer Jeff Gardiner revealed that his favorite quest of the Fallout game series was "Tranquility Lane"; he argued that the quest and the "Pint-Sized Slasher" serial killer concept was the "perfect example to [him] of the [series'] dark humor" and being able to do anything in the games.

== Reception ==
Vault 112 received positive receptions as a major part of the game's main quest, with Sarah-Jane Simpson of Screen Rant calling it "[e]asily the most twisted experiment and the worst Fallout 3 Vault to live in". She also argued that the vault's questline, due to Braun's cruelty, is "one of the strangest and darkest" in the game. Joe Donnelly of Vice followed a similar opinion, stating that "[a]gainst the death, destruction, and irradiated monstrosities that roam the unforgiving wilderness, Tranquility Lane marks an entirely different, yet no less terrifying, warped reality" from the evilness of Braun. He cited the experience being the "most chilling dream sequence of any video game" as the reason he decided to have it analyzed as a dream by a holistic therapist for his article's topic. Alberto Martín, writing for VidaExtra, said that Vault 112 was an experience that he'll never forget, and that the story of artificially happy location being a facade for stranger contents is worthy of a thriller story. He recalled having a similar feeling while playing Starfield, in which he came across a settlement called the Crucible that is filled with clones of historical figures and felt disturbed by it being another immoral biological-social experiment. PC Gamer editor Jody Macgregor expressed that side quests tend to be fan favorites of Bethesda-produced games, his favorite quest, Tranquility Lane, is part of the main game of Fallout 3. He felt that the option of acting as the Pint-Sized Slasher amidst cheerful music and a setting strongly contrasting with the bleak outside world was hilarious and brought a sense of dark humor from the original Fallout that was not carried into Fallout 2.

Vault 112 and its Tranquility Lane program have been the subjects of various analyses from scholarly sources. Derrick Rowan, for another journal Reconstruction: Studies in Contemporary Culture, explained the role of Vault-Tec's vaults in the illusion of safety for its residents. He referred to Vault 112 as a "disturbing take" on the vaults' role in preservation of individuals, discussing about how its simulation of pre-war society emulates a method of preservation but came to function as a prison for experiments. Thus, he suggested that Vault 112 was ultimately among the Vault-Tec technologies that failed to keep people safe. Polish academic scholar Péter Kristóf Makai discussed Vault 112 in the context of the removal of people from reality into idealized life, in which the player could be responsible for interrupting it under Braun by massacring the entire rest of the population. He explained that the sequence of events was to both showcase post-World War II life and to show how the player's obedience makes them responsible for the proportion of crime that amounts to a genocide. He additionally suggested that it was a satire towards how people, including game designers and players, kill in video games for fun as proven by both Braun and the player character.

Sarah Grey, having written for the 2009 Philosophy of Computer Games Conference, analyzed several elements of Vault 112's Tranquility Lane world. For one, she noted that while the utopia-like world is to the point where most residents get irritated towards the Lone Wanderer if they suggest that it is actually otherwise, the player setting the Chinese Invasion program to permanently kill them off is a "startling contrast to the rollicking mid-century sit-com atmosphere". She also highlighted the lack of a truly moral option and that the player character has to kill off the vault residents in some form within the simulation. Grey also connected the Chinese soldiers' mowing down of the American residents to the player's own behavior throughout the game, likely having killed a lot of people in the Capital Wasteland. The writer finally proposed that the game's dream world is an instance of a game event that "jolts one from immersive, flowing gameplay and interjects unexpected emotional response" to make for philosophical reflections from the player. Theresa Claire Devine and two other coauthors, writing for Games and Culture, recalled the two paths that the player character can choose in Tranquility Lane to allow themself and their father to exit the simulation and said that the Chinese Invasion program did not make it clear that the Lone Wanderer would not be a target and could therefore potentially be seen as suicide. They criticized the lack of any nonviolent resistance path (i.e. by spearheading an overthrow of Braun as the overseer), stating that it is limited in morality options for the player character and thus "stays entrenched in its mediocrity, stubbornly trapping the players in the limited design".

Dominic Brakelmann, for a chapter of a Fallout series analysis book, compared Vault-Tec vaults to the scientific concept of black boxes, which are "opaque" systems which can be understood from the inputs and outputs involving it but not its internal workings. He explained that since the interiors of the vaults can be studied as archaeological spaces that can be analyzed without needing to look solely at their inputs and outputs, especially since the spaces have been stagnant in the case of internal activities ceasing. Vault 112, he explained, has a retrofuturistic appearance but was very advanced technology for a fully immersive virtual reality program. The author pointed out that while the pop culture-influenced Tranquility Lounge capsules and the server room are both visual cues pointed towards a system of virtual reality, the text in the computer terminals convey specific details within Vault 112, including with insight from Braun on past events; his terminal entries then highlighted both the simulation's structures and the degree of ethics, especially with the showcasing of poor ethical standards and sadism that could be studied as an instance of science as a crime. Brakelmann said that Vault 112 could be seen as being within both the past and present rather than as a museum. He finally interpreted Vault 112's status as a "desire path" (in which it overlaps with the game's main quest and therefore becomes an element of it), its aesthetics, and lore as an example of self-contained elements within the game like with other vaults. Daniel Singleton, for a chapter of another book, referred to Braun's simulation, his "increasingly absurd list of tasks" he assigns to the Lone Wanderer to torment the local residents, and his reassurance that he can bring them back from simulated death as a parody of "'50s pop culture for conjuring fictional utopias" but also bring into focus the themes of "creating inconsequential virtual realities and enabling all sorts of perverse power fantasies about technologies."
