= Dark Champions =

Tabletop role-playing game

- Dark Champions book cover
- Designers: Steven S. Long
- Publishers: Hero Games
- Publication: 2004
- Genres: action-adventure, modern
- Systems: Hero System

Dark Champions is an action-adventure role-playing game published by Hero Games in 2004 that uses the 5th edition of the Hero System.

== Description ==
The emphasis in this game is on modern action adventures in the fields of espionage, military and police work. The book includes advice on character creation; as a timesaver, players can opt to use one of several pre-generated character packages. The game focuses on people with ordinary abilities, but there is an option to create more cinematic characters with "super skills", which is more fully explored in the supplement Dark Champions: The Animated Series (2005).

Rules cover modern combat, firearms, equipment, as well as designing weapons and equipment. There is also information about forensic science, organized crime and terrorism.

== Publication history ==
The first game released by Hero Games in 1983 was the superhero role-playing game Champions, created by Steven S. Long using the first iteration of the Hero System. In 1993, Long created a subversive twist on the Champions game titled Dark Champions, which featured morally ambiguous costumed vigilantes.

Following the release of the 5th edition of the Hero System, Long designed Dark Champions, released by Hero Games in 2004. Although identically titled to the 1993 game, this new game had nothing in common with the 1993 release, focusing on modern world action adventure rather than costumed vigilantes.

Due to a general slow-down in the games industry in the mid-2000s, Hero Games only released a few supplements for this game over the next year, the last of which was Dark Champions: The Animated Series (2005). Dark Champions was discontinued shortly after that and was not adapted for the 6th edition of the Hero System that was introduced in 2009.

== Awards ==
At the 2005 ENnie Awards, Dark Champions was finalist in the category "Best Supplement."
