= Ghost Story Games =

American video game developer

Ghost Story Games, LLC
- Type: Subsidiary
- Industry: Video games
- Predecessor: Irrational Games
- Founded: February 22, 2017; 9 years ago
- Founder: Ken Levine
- Headquarters: Westwood, Massachusetts, US
- Key people: Ken Levine; (president and creative director)
- Number of employees: 33 (2020)
- Parent: Take-Two Interactive
- Website: ghoststorygames.com

Ghost Story Games, LLC is an American video game developer based in Westwood, Massachusetts, and led by Ken Levine. The studio was announced in February 2017 as the continuation of Irrational Games, a studio of Take-Two Interactive that had been closed in 2014. Levine saw the change as a move into more emergent narrative-driven titles compared to the larger titles they had made under Irrational. Ghost Story Games's first game, Judas, was announced in 2022.

== History ==
Irrational Games had a history of several successful titles, including BioShock and BioShock Infinite, both helmed by Levine. Levine expressed how much stress completing a large title was at the conclusion of work of BioShock Infinite, and decided that he would drastically trim down the studio "to refocus my energy on a smaller team with a flatter structure and a more direct relationship with gamers. In many ways, it will be a return to how we started: a small team making games for the core gaming audience." While Levine had considered founding a new startup for this endeavor, Take-Two convinced Levine that they would still be the best place for his studio. On February 18, 2014, the studio was restructured: Levine kept about 15 others, with Take-Two, 2K Games, and the studio helping to find positions for the other 75 employees. At this point, Irrational was effectively shut down, though over the next few years, it would continue to provide new job openings.

In October 2016, several video game journalists noted that Take-Two had filed a trademark for the name "Ghost Story", related to video games, but otherwise not clear what this was for. On February 22, 2017, the studio announced it had rebranded itself as Ghost Story Games, though they were treating it as a fresh start as a newly founded studio. It was founded by 12 of the former Irrational members with Levine still as president and creative director. The studio's focus is "to create immersive, story-driven games for people who love games that ask something of them"; the name was chosen as ghost stories "are immersive, exciting, and steeped in community", similar to their design philosophies. As of this point, the studio had about 25 employees.

At the 2014 Game Developers Conference following the restructure, Levine presented his idea of "narrative Legos" that he wanted to explore with this studio. Levine stated that in this concept, they can distill narrative elements to key aspects that the player can learn, act upon, and affect a non-linear narrative story, and then combine them in a way to make a player-driven, highly-replayable game. In January 2015, Levine said that their first game with the narrative Legos concept will be a "first-person sci-fi" game. During a presentation at the March 2017 EGX Rezzed conference, Levine said that this game uses a system inspired by the Nemesis System within Middle-earth: Shadow of Mordor, which he found provided a way to include a larger metanarrative in a game without having to customize a lot of story or dialog for it. Further, he said they included the idea of "radical recognition", in which the game's world responds in some way to actions that the player makes in a more programmatic manner, in contrast to the narrative approach used by Telltale Games which simply features branching decisions. Levine also anticipated the game will not be as "smooth" for players in contrast to the BioShock games, in that he does not anticipate that they will explain how the game's mechanics work directly to the player but require the player to figure out as they go.

By the start of 2022, Bloomberg News reported that work on the studio's first game had fallen into development hell, having been in progress for at least seven years. Employees of the studio, speaking to Bloomberg, stated that the development had been setback by several reboots of the game and changes in direction made by Levine, as well as Levine's management style which had led to employee burnout.

The studio's first game, Judas, was announced at The Game Awards 2022. It was planned for release on PlayStation 5, Xbox Series X/S and Windows during Take Two's 2025 fiscal year which ended March 31, 2025.
