= George Ziets =

American video game designer

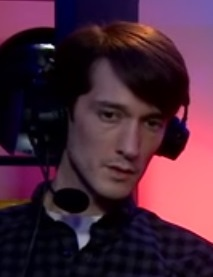
- Ziets giving a game demo
- Occupation: Video game designer
- Employer: Digimancy Entertainment
- Known for: Neverwinter Nights 2: Mask of the Betrayer; Torment: Tides of Numenera; Pillars of Eternity

George Ziets is an American video game designer best known as the Creative Lead for the 2007 PC game Neverwinter Nights 2: Mask of the Betrayer.

== Early life and education ==
Ziets earned a degree in Psychology from Georgetown University and spent the late 1990s in graduate school. He studied psychology and film, earning an MA from the University of Maryland in 1999. In 2001, he secured his first games industry job at Westwood Studios, working as a writer on the short-lived science fiction MMORPG Earth & Beyond.

== Career ==
In 2004, Ziets was hired at Turbine, Inc. and was credited as a designer on Lord of the Rings Online: Shadows of Angmar (LOTRO) and Dungeons & Dragons Online (DDO).

Ziets relocated to southern California in 2006 to become a designer at Obsidian Entertainment. He was recruited during development of Neverwinter Nights 2, and after the game shipped he was promoted to Creative Lead on the first Neverwinter Night 2 expansion, Mask of the Betrayer (MotB). Ziets was responsible for MotB's overall creative vision, including characters and story. MotB shipped in 2007 and received mostly positive reviews, winning praise for its story and narrative elements.

Ziets left Obsidian in 2008 and spent a year at ZeniMax Online Studios, but he returned to Obsidian in 2009 to serve as Creative Lead on Dungeon Siege 3 and its expansion, Dungeon Siege 3: Treasures of the Sun. He expanded the fictional canon of the Dungeon Siege world, producing a 100-page sourcebook that was used as source material by the development team. At some point during the development of Dungeon Siege 3, Ziets also contributed to the writing of Fallout: New Vegas. In 2011, he shared a WGA nomination for Best Videogame Writing with the Fallout: New Vegas writing team and attended the 2011 Writers Guild Awards in Los Angeles.

He left Obsidian after a project got cancelled in 2012, however he returned soon after as a freelance writer on Pillars of Eternity.

In March 2013 it was announced that Ziets would join the writing team at inXile on Torment: Tides of Numenera, and he later joined inXile as a full-time employee in April 2014.

Ziets left inXile in July 2019 to found his own studio, Digimancy Entertainment.
