= Judas (video game) =

Upcoming video game

- Developer: Ghost Story Games
- Publisher: Ghost Story Games
- Director: Ken Levine
- Engine: Unreal Engine
- Platforms: PlayStation 5; Windows; Xbox Series X/S
- Genre: First-person shooter
- Mode: Single-player

Judas is an upcoming first-person shooter game developed and published by Ghost Story Games. The game is scheduled to release for PlayStation 5, Windows, and Xbox Series X/S.

== Premise ==
Judas takes place on the Mayflower, a generation ship traveling through space carrying the last remnants of humanity to Proxima Centauri. The ship is run by three individuals: Tom, who wishes to preserve humanity in its original form; Nefertiti, his Nobel Prize-winning wife who wishes to transform humanity into a race of robots, free of flaw; and their adopted daughter, Hope, who wishes to "delete" herself from existence. Computers control society, including grooming the human residents to be model citizens and report on those that deviate from expected behavior. The game's main character, Judas, has been able to break free of that direction, her actions leading to revolution aboard the Mayflower.

== Development and release ==
Judas is the debut title for Ghost Story Games, a studio founded by Ken Levine following the shutdown of Irrational Games, the developer of the BioShock series. The game's concept started in 2014 when Levine talked and explained ideas that they would want to work on during Game Developers Conference with "narrative Legos", where they can alter story elements, which they can use to make a very re-playable game, with multiple outcomes. Levine described the inspiration of these narrative Legos extending from his past experiences in writing key non-playable characters, including SHODAN in System Shock 2 and Andrew Ryan in BioShock. He had desired to include these ideas with Elizabeth in BioShock Infinite, having her more reactive to the player's actions, but the narrative structure of the game prevented him from exploring this idea too much. Instead, he had come up with the narrative Lego concept to consider building a game without a fixed narrative, one that could be built from pre-built sections of narrative, level design, art assets, and other aspects that could be assembled on the fly in response to the player's actions.

In 2015, Levine stated that this game would be a first-person science fiction game, similar to the System Shock series. Middle-earth: Shadow of Mordor, in particular its Nemesis system, was cited as one of the game's inspirations. Levine added that the game would be a more challenging experience than BioShock and BioShock Infinite. In January 2022, Jason Schreier of Bloomberg News reported that the game had fallen into development hell, with Levine's style of workplace leading to employee burnout.

In December 2022, at The Game Awards 2022, Judas was revealed with an announcement trailer. The game is scheduled to release for PlayStation 5, Xbox Series X/S, and Windows via Steam and Epic Games Store. In February 2023, parent company Take-Two Interactive's CEO, Strauss Zelnick, expected the game to release by March 2025 at the latest. In April 2025, Levine confirmed the game was still in development.

In July 2025, Levine confirmed that Judas would be a single-player game focused on storytelling and not monetization. "You buy the game and you get the whole thing. There's no online component, there's no live service, because everything we do is in service of telling the story and transporting the player" said Levine in an interview.
