= Degrees of Separation =

2019 puzzle game developed by Moondrop

- Developer: Moondrop
- Publisher: Modus Games
- Designer: Stig-Owe Sandvik
- Programmer: Alejandro Ruiz Temina
- Artists: Stig-Owe Sandvik; Karoline Skoglund Olsen
- Writers: Chris Avellone; Jason McNamara
- Composer: Kristian Brastein
- Platforms: Microsoft Windows; Nintendo Switch; PlayStation 4; Xbox One
- Release: February 14, 2019
- Genres: Puzzle video game; Platform video game
- Modes: Single-player, multiplayer

Degrees of Separation is a 2019 puzzle video game developed by the Norwegian studio Moondrop and published by Modus Games.

== Release ==
In September 2018, Modus Games announced that they would publish the game in February 2019. It was released on February 14, 2019, for Nintendo Switch, PlayStation 4, Xbox One, and for Windows via Steam.

== Story and Gameplay ==
The game revolves around two characters - Ember, a girl from a kingdom that thrives off of heat and Rime, a boy from a kingdom that thrives off of ice - who must use their powers of heat and ice in order to discover what has led to the downfall of their respective kingdoms. The game is a co-operative platformer, and has both local and online multiplayer.

== Reception ==
Reception

Aggregate scores
Aggregator	Score
Metacritic	(PC) 74/100 (Xbox One) 65/100 (PS4) 70/100 (NS) 68/100
OpenCritic	37% recommend

Review score
Publication	Score
Nintendo World Report	6.5/10

The PC, Xbox One, PlayStation 4, and Nintendo Switch versions of the game all received "mixed or average" reviews from critics, according to the review aggregation website Metacritic. Fellow review aggregator OpenCritic assessed that the game received fair approval, being recommended by 37% of critics. Reviewing the game for Nintendo World Report, James Jones praised the story while criticizing the number of bugs.
