= Neverwinter Nights 2: Mask of the Betrayer =

2007 video game

- European cover art
- Developer: Obsidian Entertainment
- Publisher: Atari Interactive
- Director: George Ziets
- Producer: Kevin Saunders
- Designer: Kevin Saunders
- Programmer: Richard Taylor
- Artists: Justin Cherry; Tim Cox
- Writer: George Ziets
- Composer: Rik Schaffer
- Series: Neverwinter Nights
- Engine: Electron Engine
- Platform: Microsoft Windows
- Release: EU: September 28, 2007; NA: October 9, 2007; AU: October 26, 2007
- Genre: Role-playing
- Modes: Single-player, multiplayer

Neverwinter Nights 2: Mask of the Betrayer is a role-playing video game developed by Obsidian Entertainment and published by Atari Interactive. It is an expansion pack for Neverwinter Nights 2. It was released in 2007 for Microsoft Windows in North America, Europe, and Australia. Like the first game, Mask of the Betrayer is set in the Forgotten Realms campaign setting of the fantasy tabletop role-playing game Dungeons & Dragons and employs the 3.5 edition rules.

Mask of the Betrayer continues the story of Neverwinter Nights 2 by following the main character, the Shard-bearer, who is afflicted by a curse that requires the devouring of spirits (and occasionally souls) to survive, and the character's quest to determine the nature of the curse. The game takes place in two nations of the Forgotten Realms, Rashemen and Thay, which are considered part of Faerûn's "Unapproachable East".

The expansion received generally favorable reviews upon its release. New character traits, such as spells and combat abilities, were welcomed by players, as were the storyline and setting. The game's technical aspects received mixed reception, with some reviewers welcoming the changes and others complaining that the technical glitches present in the original game had still not been addressed. The new "spirit eating" mechanic, which forces players to constantly replenish the main character's life force by sucking out the force of spirits, undead, and gods was not appreciated by many reviewers.

== Gameplay ==
Mask of the Betrayer is an expansion pack for Neverwinter Nights 2 and its core gameplay is identical. The game uses the 3.5 edition rules of the tabletop role-playing game Dungeons & Dragons. Players can create a character from scratch and make use of Mask of the Betrayer's new races, classes, and feats, or import an existing character from Neverwinter Nights 2. Characters must be at level 18 to begin the game. The level cap has been raised from 20 to 30, allowing for epic level characters and accompanying prestige classes and feats. Mask of the Betrayer features all of the races from Neverwinter Nights 2, as well as introducing two types of elves (the wild elf and the half-drow), and four types of genasi. It also contains two new base classes, the "favored soul" and "spirit shaman", and five new prestige classes. The game adds more than 100 new feats and magical spells to the base game.

Like other Dungeons & Dragons games, the player character in Mask of the Betrayer generally relies on combat to progress throughout the game. The hero has different options in combat depending on their choice of class and abilities, including melee or ranged physical attacks and spells. The player character also has the opportunity to solve puzzles occasionally, such as breaking a contract with a devil by searching for loopholes. Certain actions, such as defeating enemies, result in the player character being awarded with experience points which are used to gain levels and become more powerful. Throughout the adventure, the player character is able to recruit followers and create a party. Each follower has their own agenda, and the hero may alienate followers with their actions if they disagree on a course of action.

== Plot ==
=== Setting ===
Like other games in the Neverwinter Nights series, Mask of the Betrayer takes place in the Forgotten Realms campaign setting. The story is a direct sequel to the plot of Neverwinter Nights 2, set almost immediately following the events at the main game's end. The main campaign is set in Rashemen near the kingdom of Thay, and the Red Wizards of Thay are a driving force behind the campaign story.

=== Story ===
In Act I, the Shard-bearer's story resumes after the defeat of the King of Shadows. The player awakens alone in an underground barrow in Rashemen, where he meets Safiya, a Red Wizard of Thay. The player follows Safiya to the Veil Theater in the nearby town of Mulsantir, hoping to find Lienna, an acquaintance of Safiya's mother, who is supposed to provide the player with some much-needed answers. Unfortunately, the player finds that the theater has been attacked by Red Wizards, and Lienna has been killed. At the back of the theater, the player finds a portal to the Plane of Shadow, a dark reflection of the Prime Material Plane, where he defeats the Red Wizards who murdered Lienna. Upon returning to the Prime Material Plane, the player finds that the spirit-god Okku has besieged Mulsantir, demanding the player's blood. The player confronts Okku and defeats his spirit army. At the end of the battle, the player learns that he has become a spirit-eater, an accursed being who must feed upon feys and elementals (and sometimes mortal souls) in order to survive.

In Act II, the player meets a group of gargoyle-like creatures who reveal that Lienna and her "red twin" ordered them to kidnap the player from the Sword Coast. This plot was allegedly inspired by the Slumbering Coven, a sisterhood of hag oracles who dwell in an ancient flooded city. The player follows this clue to Lake Mulsantir, where he finds another portal to the Plane of Shadow. In this "alternate reality," the player enters the flooded city and confronts the hags. The Slumbering Coven reveal that Lienna, along with Safiya's mother Nefris, were responsible for the hero's current dilemma. They send the player to Nefris's Academy in Thay to discover her motive.

At the Academy, the player enters a portal to the Astral Plane where they meet Myrkul, the former god of the dead. Myrkul reveals that the spirit-eater "curse" originated as a punishment for his former servant, Akachi "The Betrayer", who once led a crusade against the realm of the dead. Akachi's empty and hungering soul now resides in the player's body, and the player's own soul has been displaced to the Wall of the Faithless, in the realm of the dead.

In Act III, the player meets the Founder of the Academy, and Safiya realizes that she, Lienna, and Nefris are all splinters of the Founder's soul, and that the Founder was once Akachi's lover. The Founder explains that, while Lienna and Nefris understood their identities, the truth was hidden from Safiya for her own safety. The Founder also admits that she is responsible for the player's plight – she wanted to use the player to end the spirit-eater curse (and Akachi's suffering, as well). She returns the silver sword of Gith to the player, which allows him to open the Betrayer's Gate and travel to the realm of the dead. There the player finds the City of Judgment, ruled by the current God of the Dead, Kelemvor Lyonsbane. As the player arrives, an army is assembling outside the walls, led by Akachi's captains from his First Crusade – Zoab, a fallen solar, Rammaq, a demilich, and Sey'ryu, a blue dragon. The captains recognize the player as Akachi's heir, and the player must decide whether to lead their crusade against the City of Judgment or to oppose them.

Depending upon his choice, the player character must assault or defend three key positions around the City of Judgment. After the battle, the player learns where his own soul is located and wrests it from the Wall of the Faithless. The player is then pulled into a dreamscape where he must battle Akachi's avatar, The Faceless Man, for control of his soul. After defeating the Faceless Man, Kelemvor narrates the ending, which varies based on the player's choices throughout the game.

== Development ==
Obsidian Entertainment began planning Mask of the Betrayer, codenamed "NX1" by its developers, before the release of Neverwinter Nights 2. The game was announced in April 2007. Obsidian Entertainment's CEO, Feargus Urquhart, said that Mask of the Betrayer would continue the story of Neverwinter Nights 2, and improvements would be made in character development and the companion system along the lines of a previous Obsidian game, Star Wars: Knights of the Old Republic II. Lead designer Kevin Saunders described the game as "high-level", and characters would need to be at least level 18 before starting. A character could be imported from the first game, or players could make one from scratch and take advantage of Mask of the Betrayer's new races, classes, and other features. The races consisted of two new types of elf as well as all four basic types of elemental genasi; all of which had been commonly requested by the fan community. New base classes include the favored soul and the spirit shaman, both divine in nature. Prestige classes include the Red Wizard of Thay, the first time the class has appeared in a video game, and the Arcane Scholar of Candlekeep, a new class created by the game's developers. Obsidian stated that the game would also include over 100 new feats and spells, including many epic feats.

A priority for developers was the improvement of the original game's performance. Saunders said "Throughout the course of the project, we fixed many bugs, optimized performance, made better use of the graphics technology, and in general, tied up loose ends. For example, we revamped the camera and party controls, adding an RTS-like strategy mode that makes combat much more enjoyable." Neverwinter Nights 2 programmers made improvements to the engine,. such as the addition of a color desaturation filter that turns almost all colors into shades of black and white. The art team developed new environments for the regions of Rashemen and Thay that they felt would be appealing to the game's modding community, such as snow-covered forests and a magical academy. Mask of the Betrayer is the first time either region has been featured in a Dungeons & Dragons video game; Obsidian stated that one design goal was "to immerse the player in the land of Rashemen. The art, music and characters were chosen and crafted to convey this very intriguing area of the Forgotten Realms."

Concept art of the new genasi race. Their inclusion in Mask of the Betrayer had been a point of contention among the design team.

Modifications were also made to the Neverwinter Nights 2 toolset with the intention of giving more options to module creators in the fan community and making it easier for players taking the role of the Dungeon Master. Urquhart said that the additions include "an Appearance editor for humanoids and monsters to make it easier to cloth and color them, the saving and loading of lighting sets, undo functionality for terrain drawing, creating blueprints more easily, adding in more trees to use, [and] refining the texture sculpting tools." Over two dozen monsters were created for Mask of the Betrayer, such as new types of golem, dragons, and hagspawn. New spell effects, character models, and environmental effects were also added; Saunders stated that the genasi models in particular had been a challenge for artists and he had originally opposed the inclusion of the new races because of this.

We want to reach a higher degree of companion reactivity in Mask of the Betrayer.

— Lead designer Kevin Saunders, Obsidian Entertainment

The design team was focused on making the companion system deeper and contain a sense of accountability with players. Companions who are treated well and who agree with the protagonist's actions bestow certain benefits, such as bonuses in combat. Companions who are treated poorly will not cooperate with the hero and may even abandon the hero. The story, revolving around the hole in the player character's chest and his need to feed on the spirits of others to survive, was described by Obsidian as less all-encompassing than the first game and more personal in nature. Saunders commented "It's an epic story, but it's a very personal one. You awaken in a pool of your own blood. Your immediate goal is survival. The shard of the Sword of Gith has been ripped from your chest and in its place is a dark hunger, a craving that threatens to consume you. The early part of the game involves determining the source and implications of this craving." Saunders also stated that the story, written by creative lead George Ziets, was "very dark" and that the ending would bring some closure to the story of the Shard-Bearer.

== Critical reception ==
Reception

Aggregate scores
Aggregator	Score
GameRankings	82%
Metacritic	82/100

Review scores
Publication	Score
1Up.com	B+
Eurogamer	7/10
Game Informer	9/10
GameSpot	8/10
GameSpy	3.5/5
GamesRadar+	8/10
GameZone	8.3/10
IGN	8.5/10

Reviews of Mask of the Betrayer were generally favorable. Obsidian Entertainment's handling of epic levels in the expansion was particularly praised, although some reviewers said that at higher levels the expansion became unbalanced. A number of reviewers mentioned that the expansion allows for more customization of both characters and levels, with Game Informer saying that "Piles of new feats, spells, and classes will give even seasoned D&D vets plenty to explore, either in the official campaign or custom scenarios built by the community. Likewise, builders can benefit from the ever-improving toolset and (supposedly) fixed persistent-world implementation." Eurogamer also described the new classes, prestige classes, and races as "pretty damn neat". Eurogamer stated that starting Neverwinter Nights 2 over from the beginning after installing Mask of the Betrayer is also interesting because the expansion "integrate[s] with the previous game (i.e. you can select one of the new races and classes and go back and play NWN2 with them)".

Reviewers said that the expansion's single-player game was more difficult than that of Neverwinter Nights 2; 1UP.com stated that Obsidian "[Upped] the ante with tougher enemies and a more challenging experience altogether". The expansion also has more puzzles which make the player think, rather than somehow being resolvable through combat, with one reviewer noting that the expansion has "genuinely tough logic puzzles (some frustratingly short on clues) and a series of side quests that completely vary (some might not even open up) depending on your party makeup". Multiple reviewers mentioned that the expansion is more serious than Neverwinter Nights 2.

The game's story and writing were praised by many reviewers, with some noting its avoidance of common fantasy clichés. Some reviewers also compared the quality and tone of the writing to Neil Gaiman's The Sandman series and to Planescape: Torment.

Planescape: Torment fans will feel right at home, reading the intriguing passages that depict the character's actions and feelings, among other things, while newcomers will probably just skip them (their loss). And even though the amount of text is nowhere near as large as that of PS:T, the quality is right up there with the big boys, with even the most insignificant ally having at least one or two interesting things to say.

— Biessener, Adam; Juba, Joe, GameInformer

The expansion's sound was described by GameZone as being "exactly what it needs to [be], in that it supports the story and gameplay." Its voice work was described as "decent", although some dialogue is purely text. Graphics were also improved from Neverwinter Nights 2, with better textures and spell effects, in addition to a new option so that the player can change the game's level of violence. Reviewers also mentioned that the graphics, especially that of spells such as lightning, could make combat difficult; GameSpy said, "All those high-level spells also throw out a ton of spectacular graphics effects that do wonders to obscure what's going on during a battle. As beautiful as they are ..., we'd trade all the eye candy in the world for the ability to accurately select a target."

Mask of the Betrayer was nominated for Best RPG of the Year by G4 TV, and it was named Runner-up for RPG of the Year by GameBanshee.

Criticism of the expansion was aimed at its poor camera angles and other technical issues, although the game and updates since Neverwinter Nights 2's release fixed many bugs of the original. IGN criticized the spirit meter mechanic, a statement echoed by GameSpy, who said "On a purely mechanical level, the spirit meter ends up being more annoyance than fun. ... from a role-playing/story standpoint it's actually the reverse of what the mechanic was supposed to accomplish."

John Walker, for GamesRadar, criticized the companions available: "NWN2 was immediately joyful, with hilarious characters and dialogue juxtaposing the dark story. MotB is far more serious, and while the companions fulfill the role of representing personality extremes, none of them are particularly entertaining company. There's no one to compare with Khelgar's dwarfish temper, nor Neeshka's impish naughtiness. Most are positively dull. And this isn't helped by the opening dungeon being tedious beyond belief."

== See also ==
- List of PC games
- 2007 in video gaming
