= History of Western role-playing video games =

Western role-playing video games are role-playing video games developed in the Western world, including the Americas and Europe. They originated on mainframe university computer systems in the 1970s, were later popularized by titles such as Ultima and Wizardry in the early- to mid-1980s, and continue to be produced for modern home computer and video game console systems. The genre's "Golden Age" occurred in the mid- to late-1980s, and its popularity suffered a downturn in the mid-1990s as developers struggled to keep up with changing fashion, hardware evolution and increasing development costs. A later series of isometric role-playing games, published by Interplay Productions and Blizzard Entertainment, was developed over a longer time period and set new standards of production quality.

Computer role-playing games (CRPGs) are once again popular. Recent titles, such as BioWare's Mass Effect series and Bethesda Softworks' The Elder Scrolls series, have been produced for console systems and have received multi-platform releases, although independently developed games are frequently created as personal computer (PC) exclusives. Developers of role-playing games have continuously experimented with various graphical perspectives and styles of play, such as real-time and turn-based time-keeping systems, axonometric and first-person graphical projections, and single-character or multi-character parties. Subgenres include action role-playing games, roguelikes and tactical role-playing games.

== Early American computer RPGs (mid-1970s–mid-1980s) ==
=== Mainframe computers (mid-1970s–early 1980s) ===
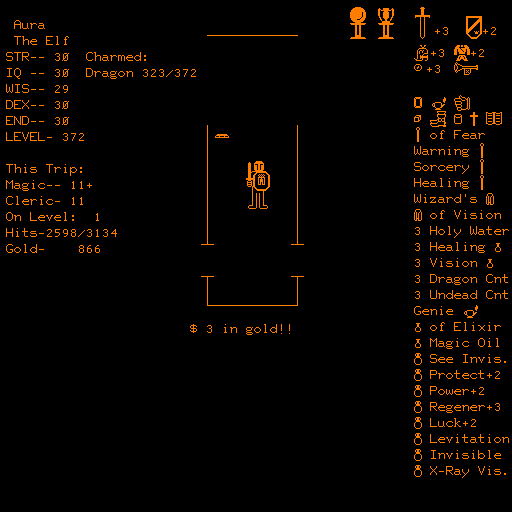
Simple overhead monochrome graphics of dnd on the PLATO mainframe system

The earliest role-playing video games were created in the mid-to-late 1970s, as offshoots of early university mainframe text-based RPGs that were played on PDP-10, PLATO and Unix-based systems. These included m199h, created in 1974, (Note: The file "m199h" was quickly deleted by PLATO administrators, so no copy of its source code survives.) Dungeon, written in 1975 or 1976, pedit5, created in 1975, (Note: Pedit5 was later deleted and lost to history.) and dnd, also from 1975. These early games were inspired by pen-and-paper role-playing games, particularly Dungeons & Dragons, which was first published in 1974, and J. R. R. Tolkien's The Lord of the Rings trilogy. Some of the first graphical computer RPGs (CRPGs) after pedit5 and dnd included orthanc (1978), which was named after Saruman's tower in Lord of the Rings, avathar (1979), later renamed avatar, oubliette (1977), named after the French word for "dungeon", moria (1975), dungeons of degorath, baradur, emprise, bnd, sorcery, and dndworld. (Note: Note the lower-case letters, as the PLATO mainframe's file system was case-insensitive.) All of these were developed and became popular on the PLATO system during the late 1970s, in large part due to PLATO's speed, fast graphics, and large number of players with access to its nationwide network of terminals. PLATO was a mainframe system that supported multiple users and allowed them to play simultaneously, a feature not commonly available to owners of home personal computer systems at the time. These were followed by games on other platforms, such as Temple of Apshai, written in 1979 for the TRS-80 and followed by two add-ons; Akalabeth: World of Doom (1980), which gave rise to the well-known Ultima series; Wizardry (1981), and Sword of Fargoal (1982). Games of this era were also influenced by text adventures such as Colossal Cave Adventure (1976) and Zork (1976); early MUDs, tabletop wargames such as Chainmail (1971), and sports games such as Strat-O-Matic. (Note: Chainmail was the official combat handbook for the first edition of Dungeons & Dragons.)

Gary Gygax [co-creator of Dungeons & Dragons] was pivotal to the development of the gaming industry, and to my own career. (...) Millions upon millions of players around the world live and play in imaginary worlds built on the back of what Gary first conceived.

— Richard Garriott, following Gygax's death in 2008

The popular dungeon crawler Rogue was developed in 1980, for Unix-based systems, by two students at Berkeley. It used ASCII graphics, and featured a deep system of gameplay and a multitude of randomly generated items and locations. Rogue was later distributed as free software with the BSD operating system, and was followed by an entire genre of "roguelikes" that were inspired by and emulated the original game's mechanics, and by later titles such as Diablo. Later examples of roguelikes include Angband (1990), Ancient Domains of Mystery (1993) and Linley's Dungeon Crawl (1997).

The keyboard was frequently the only input supported by these games, and their graphics were simple and often monochromatic. Some titles, like Rogue, represented objects through text characters, such as '@' for the main character and 'Z' for zombies. (Note: Certain games, such as avatar, moria, and oubliette experimented with a first-person view, while others, such as orthanc and Rogue, featured an overhead view with branching corridors more reminiscent of table-top RPGs.) No single game featured all of the characteristics expected in a modern CRPG, such as exploration of subterranean dungeons, use of weapons and items, "leveling up" and quest completion, but it is possible to see the evolution of these features during this era and that which followed.

=== Ultima and Wizardry (early–mid-1980s) ===
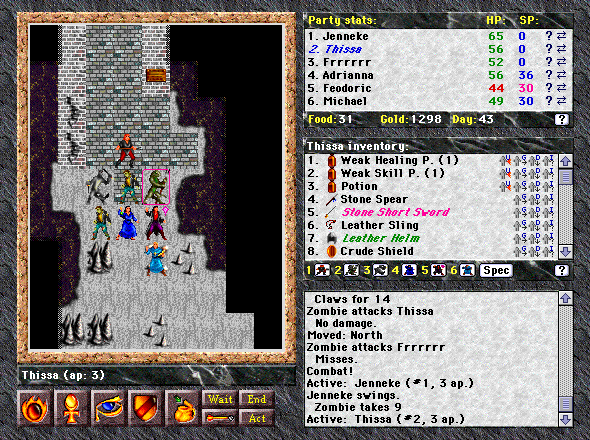
Many games emulated both the visual and narrative style of the Ultima series. Pictured here is Blades of Exile (1997).

Although simplified for use with the console gamepad, many innovations of the early Ultimas—in particular Ultima III: Exodus (1983) by developer Richard Garriott—became standard among later RPGs in both the personal computer and console markets. These ideas included the use of tiled graphics and party-based combat, a mix of fantasy and science-fiction elements, and time travel. (Note: Some of these elements were inspired by Wizardry, specifically the party-based system.) The game's written narrative was an innovative feature that allowed it to convey a larger story than was found in the minimal plots common at the time. Most games, including Garriott's own Akalabeth, focused primarily on basic gameplay mechanics like combat, and paid little attention to story and narrative.

Ultima III is considered by many to have been the first modern CRPG. It was originally published for the Apple II, but was ported to many other platforms and influenced the development of later titles, including such console RPGs as Excalibur (1983) and Dragon Quest (1986).

Garriott introduced a system of chivalry and code of conduct in Ultima IV: Quest of the Avatar (1985) that persisted throughout later Ultimas. The player's Avatar tackles such problems as fundamentalism, racism and xenophobia, and based on his or her actions is tested periodically in ways that are sometimes obvious and sometimes unseen. This code of conduct was in part a response to the efforts among some Christian groups to mitigate the rising popularity of Dungeons & Dragons. Continuing until Ultima IX: Ascension (1999), it covered a range of virtues that included compassion, justice, humility and honor. This system of morals and ethics was unique at the time, as other video games allowed players to be lauded as "heroes" by the game worlds' denizens, no matter what the player's actions had been. In Ultima IV, on the other hand, players were forced to consider the moral consequences of their actions. According to Garriott, Ultima was now "more than a mere fantasy escape. It provided a world with a framework of deeper meaning[,] a level of detail[, and] diversity of interaction[,] that is rarely attempted." "I thought people might completely reject this game because some folks play just to kill, kill, kill. To succeed in this game, you had to radically change the way you'd ever played a game before."

The Wizardry series was created for the Apple II at roughly the same time, in 1981. Wizardry featured a 3D, first-person view, an intuitive interface, party-based combat, and pre-constructed levels that encouraged players to draw their own maps. It allowed players to import characters from previous games, albeit with reduced experience levels, and introduced a moral alignment feature that limited the areas players could visit. The series was extremely difficult when compared to other RPGs of the time, possibly because they were modeled after pen-and-paper role-playing games of similar difficulty. Wizardry IV (1986) in particular is considered one of the most difficult CRPGs ever created. It is unique in that the player controls the villain of the first game in an attempt to escape his prison dungeon and gain freedom in the above world. Unlike Ultima, which evolved with each installment, the Wizardry series retained and refined the same style and core mechanics over time, and improved only its graphics and level design as the years progressed.

By June 1982, Temple of Apshai had sold 30,000 copies, Wizardry 24,000 copies, and Ultima 20,000. Garriott even discussed collaborating with Wizardry's Andrew C. Greenberg on "the ultimate fantasy role-playing game". The first Wizardry outsold (more than 200,000 copies sold in its first three years) the first Ultima and received better reviews, but over time Ultima became more popular by improving its technology and making games more friendly, while Wizardry required new players to play the first game before its first two sequels, and the very difficult Wizardry IV sold poorly.

Telengard, a BASIC port of the earlier PDP-10 game DND, and Dungeons of Daggorath, both released in 1982, introduced real-time gameplay. Earlier dungeon crawl games had used turn-based movement, in which the enemies only moved when the adventuring party did. Tunnels of Doom, produced the same year, introduced separate screens for exploration and combat. Dragon Quest is most commonly claimed as the first role-playing video game produced for a console, though journalist Joe Fielder cites the earlier Dragonstomper.

== Golden Age (late 1980s–early 1990s) ==
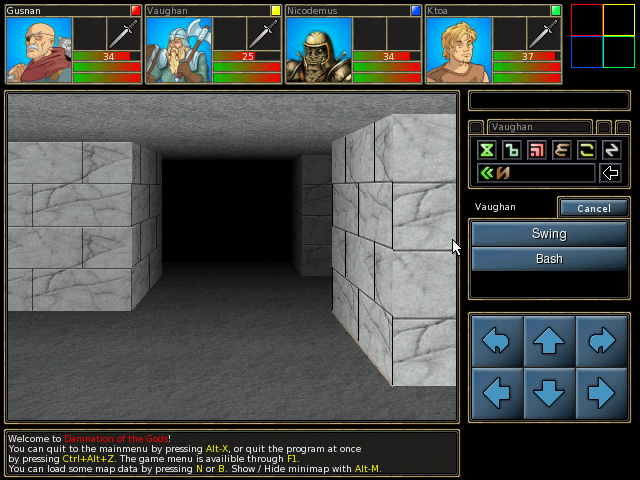
Many early RPGs, including avatar, moria and Wizardry, used a primitive form of first-person perspective, and games like Dungeons of Daggorath and Dungeon Master also featured real-time gameplay. Pictured here is Damnation of Gods, a Dungeon Master clone.

The Might and Magic series, highly popular in the 1980s and onward, began with the 1986 release of Might and Magic Book One: The Secret of the Inner Sanctum for the Apple II. It encompasses a total of ten games, the most recent of which was released in 2014, as well as the popular turn-based strategy series Heroes of Might and Magic. The series featured a mix of complex statistics, large numbers of weapons and spells, and enormous worlds in which to play. It was among the longest-lived CRPG series, alongside Ultima and Wizardry, It is also notable for making race and gender an important aspect of gameplay.

Strategic Simulations, Inc.'s series of "Gold Box" CRPGs, which began in 1988 with Pool of Radiance for the Apple II and Commodore 64, was the first widely successful official video game adaptation of TSR's Advanced Dungeons & Dragons license and rules. These games featured a first-person display for movement and exploration, combined with an overhead tactical display for combat that tried to model D&D's turn-based mechanics. Better known for producing computer wargames, SSI created one of the defining series of the period. The games spawned a series of novels, and titles continued to be published until the game engine was retired in 1993, although users who had purchased Forgotten Realms: Unlimited Adventures were able to create their own adventures and play them using the Gold Box engine. The later titles were developed by Stormfront Studios, who also produced Neverwinter Nights, a multi-player implementation of the Gold Box engine which ran on America Online from 1991 to 1997. As in the Wizardry series, characters could be imported from one game into another.

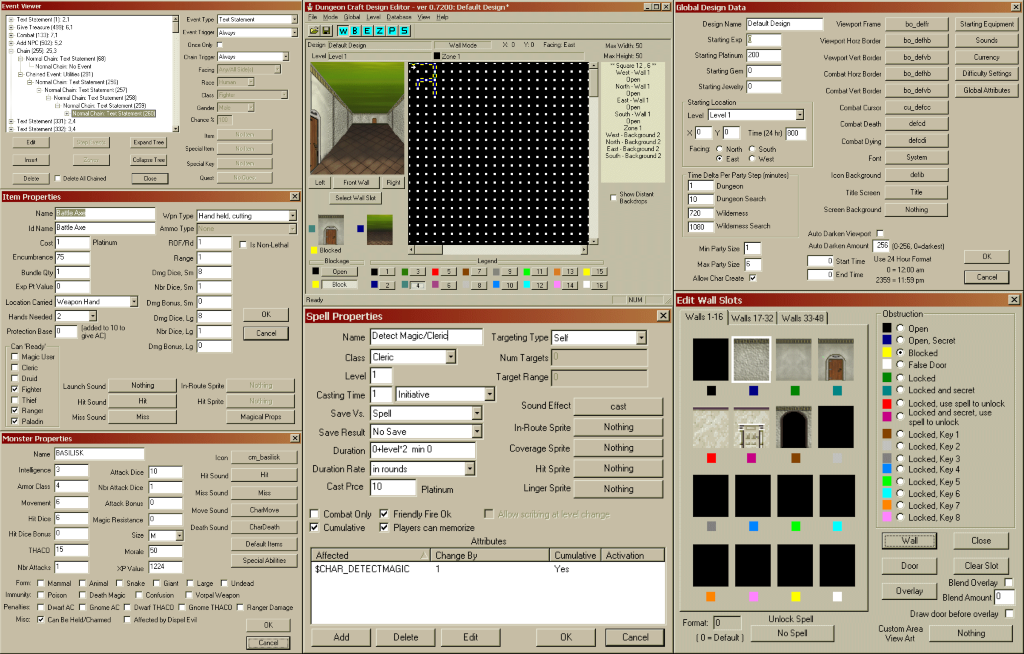
Predating the mod scene for games such as The Elder Scrolls V: Skyrim, RPG construction kits such as Forgotten Realms: Unlimited Adventures (FRUA) allowed users to create and share their own custom modules online. Pictured here is Dungeon Craft, a modern open source FRUA clone.

SSI had already published many RPGs based on original properties. Its "hardcore" RPG Wizard's Crown (1985) presaged the Gold Box games' design, with eight-character parties, a skill-based experience system, highly detailed combat mechanics, dozens of commands, injuries and bleeding, and strengths and weaknesses versus individual weapon classes. The game did not, however, offer much in terms of role-playing or narrative beyond buying, selling and killing. Wizard's Crown was followed by The Eternal Dagger in 1987, a similar game that removed some of its predecessor's more complicated elements.

Interplay Productions developed a string of hits in the form of The Bard's Tale (1985) and its sequels under publisher Electronic Arts, originally for the Apple II and Commodore 64. The series became the first outside Wizardry to challenge Ultima's sales. It combined colorful graphics with a clean interface and simple rules, and was one of the first CRPG series to reach a mainstream audience. It spawned a series of novels by authors such as Mercedes Lackey, something that arguably did not occur again until the release of Diablo in 1997. The series allowed players to explore cities in detail, at a time when many games relegated them to simple menu screens with "buy"/"sell" options. A construction set released in 1991 allowed players to create their own games, and Interplay re-used the engine in its 1988 post-apocalyptic CRPG Wasteland.

FTL Games' Dungeon Master (1987) for the Atari ST introduced several user-interface innovations, such as direct manipulation of objects and the environment using the mouse, and popularized mouse-driven interfaces for computer RPGs. Unusually for the era, it features a real-time, first-person viewpoint, now common in first-person shooters and more recent games such as The Elder Scrolls IV: Oblivion. The game's real-time combat elements were akin to Active Time Battle. The game's complex magic system used runes that could be combined in specific sequences to create magical spells. These sequences were not detailed in the game manual, instead players were required to discover them through trial and error. Sequels followed in 1989 and 1993. The game's first-person, real-time mechanics were copied in SSI's "Black Box" series, from Eye of the Beholder (1990) onward. Dungeon Master sold 40,000 copies in its first year of release, and became the best-selling Atari ST title.

Times of Lore, designed by Chris Roberts and released by Origin Systems in 1988, introduced the action-adventure and action role-playing game formula of console titles such as The Legend of Zelda to the American computer RPG market. Times of Lore and Dungeon Master went on to directly inspire several later Origin Systems titles, including Bad Blood (1990), Ultima VI: The False Prophet (1990) and Ultima VII (1992). Ultima VI made some major changes to the Ultima formula, including a constant-scale open world (replacing the unscaled overworld of earlier Ultima titles) and a point & click interface.

Ultima VII is still my favorite game. It's hard not to look at Oblivion and see the Ultima influence.

— Todd Howard, executive producer of the Elder Scrolls series

The Ultima series went on to span over a dozen titles, including the spin-off series Worlds of Ultima (1990–1991) and Ultima Underworld (1992–1993), and the multiplayer online series, Ultima Online (1997). Ultima Underworld: The Stygian Abyss (1992) offered players a full 360 degree view of the game world. Ultima VII: The Black Gate (1992) was the first real-time title in the series, and was fully playable with the computer mouse. Garriott later left Origin Systems and Electronic Arts to form Destination Games, under publisher NCsoft. He was involved with a number of NCsoft's MMORPGs, including Lineage (1998) and Tabula Rasa (2007), before his 2009 departure.

The Wizardry series' most famous titles did not appear until years after its debut, and installments were published as recently as 2001. Wizardry VII (1992) has been said to possess one of the best character class systems of any CRPG.

Quest for Glory (1989) was produced by Sierra Entertainment, known for point-and-click adventure games, and combined CRPG and adventure-game mechanics into a unique, genre-bending mix. The series featured involved stories, complex puzzles, and arcade-like combat. The last of its five titles was released in 1998. It was originally conceived as a tetralogy built around the themes of the four cardinal directions, the four classical elements, the four seasons and the four mythologies. The designers felt that the series' storyline made Shadows of Darkness too difficult, and so inserted a fifth game, Wages of War, into the canon and renumbered the series.

Legends of Valour (1992) provided an early example of open-world, non-linear gameplay in an RPG. It was cited as an influence on The Elder Scrolls series.

Sierra's Betrayal at Krondor (1993) was based upon author Raymond E. Feist's Midkemia setting. It featured turn-based, semi-tactical combat, a skill-based experience system, and a magic system similar to that of Dungeon Master, but suffered due to outdated, polygonal graphics. Feist was heavily consulted during development, and later created his own novelization based upon the game. The sequel Betrayal in Antara (1997) re-used the first game's engine but—as Sierra had lost its license for Krondor—was set in a different universe. Return to Krondor (1998) used a new game engine, but returned to Feist's setting.

Westwood Studios's Lands of Lore series (1993) featured a story-based approach to RPG design. It served as a stylistic "mirror" to Japanese RPGs of the time, with brightly colored, cheerful graphics, a simple combat system borrowed from Dungeon Master, and a semi-linear story. These elements contrasted with Western RPGs' stereotype as dark, gritty and rules-centric games.

== Decline (mid-1990s) ==
Probably one of the saddest sights over the last couple of years has been the rapid decline in computer role-playing games. [...] The emphasis [among newer CRPGs, such as Ultima VIII: Pagan] is on bigger on-screen characters with more realistic animation in a smaller game world. [...] This seems to be a part of a design philosophy which says that computer gamers don't want to play the big games any longer.

— Computer Gaming World, March 1994

There was this thought that maybe, like adventure games, RPGs were going to die out, too. [...] I wasn't the only developer that thought I'd coded myself into a corner.

— Brenda Brathwaite, former Wizardry developer

In the mid-1990s, developers of Western RPGs lost their ability to keep up with hardware advances; RPGs had previously been at or near the forefront of gaming technology, but the improved computer graphics and increased storage space facilitated by CD-ROM technology created expectations that developers struggled to meet. This caused lengthy delays between releases, and closures among less popular franchises. Scorpia in 1994 said that, "Nothing has come along to equal or exceed" Ultima IV ten years later. She wondered if "maybe nothing ever will. I hope that's not the case, though, because that would mean the CRPG has stagnated". Computer Games later wrote that "[d]uring the now-infamous mid-nineties CRPG lull, the toughest dungeons were the bottomless pits of failed designs, and the fiercest beasts the deadly-dull CRPG releases".

Increases in development budgets and team sizes meant that sequels took three or more years to be released, instead of the almost-yearly releases seen in SSI's Gold Box series. The growth of development teams increased the likelihood that software bugs would appear, as code produced by programmers working in different teams was merged into a whole. (Note: Several titles were affected by this, ruining what might have otherwise been impressive efforts.) A lack of technical standards among hardware manufacturers forced developers to support each manufacturer's implementation, or risk losing players.

Further, competition arose from other genres. Players turned away from RPGs, flight simulators and adventure games in favor of action-oriented titles, such as first-person shooters and real-time strategy games. Later RPGs would draw influences from action genres, (Note: For instance, Baldur's Gate's Warcraft-like interface, and The Elder Scrolls' first-person perspective.) but would face new challenges in the form of massively multiplayer online role-playing games (MMORPGs), a late-1990s trend that may have siphoned players away from single-player RPGs. They also faced competition from Japanese console RPGs, which were becoming increasingly dominant around that time, for reasons such as more accessible, faster-paced action-adventure-oriented gameplay, and a stronger emphasis on storytelling and character interactions.

== North American computer RPGs (late 1990s) ==
=== Diablo and action RPGs ===
The dark fantasy-themed RPG Diablo was released by Blizzard Entertainment on December 31, 1996, in the midst of a stagnant PC RPG market. Diablo is set in the fictional kingdom of Khanduras, in the world of Sanctuary, and has the player take control of a lone hero who battles to rid the world of Diablo, the Lord of Terror. Its development was influenced by Moria and Angband, and Diablo resembles a roguelike due to its focus on dungeon crawling, and its procedurally generated levels. Major differences include the commercial quality of the game's graphics, its simplified character development, and its fast, real-time action. A factor in Diablo's success was its support for online, collaborative play over a local area network or through its Battle.net online service. This greatly extended its replay value, though cheating was a problem. While not the first RPG to feature real-time combat, (Note: Diablo was originally conceived of as a turn-based game more in line with its roguelike predecessors. Other series experiencing similar pressures at about this time, such as Ultima, also abandoned the "core principles" (e.g. dice rolls, turn-based battles, multi-character parties) of table-top RPGs in favor of real-time action. Ultima IX, unlike Diablo, failed to win over many fans, however.) Diablo's effect on the market was significant, a reflection of the changes that took place in other genres following the release of the action titles, Doom and Dune II. It had many imitators, and its formula of simple, fast combat and replayability were used by what were later referred to as "Diablo clones", and more broadly "action RPGs".

Action RPGs typically give each player real-time control of a single character. Combat and action are emphasized, while plot and character interaction are kept to a minimum, a formula referred to as "the Fight, Loot, and Level cycle". The inclusion of any content beyond leveling up and killing enemies becomes a challenge in these "hack and slash" games, because the sheer number of items, locations and monsters makes it difficult to design an encounter that is unique and works regardless of how a character has been customized. On the other hand, a game that omits technical depth can seem overly streamlined. The result in either case is a repetitive experience that does not feel tailored to the player.

RPGs can suffer in the area of exploration. Traditional RPGs encourage exploration of every detail of the game world, and provide for a more organic experience in which NPCs are distributed according to the internal logic of the game world or plot. Action games reward players for quick movement from location to location, and tend to ensure that no obstacles occur along the way. Games such as Mass Effect streamline the player's movements across the game world by indicating which NPCs can be interacted with, and by making it easier for players to find locations and shopkeepers who can exchange items for money or goods. (Note: There is debate as to whether games like BioWare's Mass Effect (2007) constitute action RPGs as opposed to more traditional RPGs, or whether they can be considered RPGs at all due to the amount of streamlining. The sequels in particular pushed more in the direction of action games.) Some of the best characteristics of RPGs can be lost when these road blocks are eliminated in the name of streamlining the player's experience.

One action RPG which overcame these limitations was the FPS/RPG hybrid Deus Ex (2000), designed by Warren Spector. This cyberpunk spy thriller offered multiple solutions to problems through intricately layered dialogue choices, a deep skill tree, and hand-crafted environments. Players were challenged to act in-character through dialog choices appropriate to his or her chosen role, and by intelligent use of the surrounding environment. This produced a unique experience that was tailored to each player. According to Spector, the game's dialogue choices were inspired by the console role-playing game, Suikoden (1995).

Diablo was followed by the Diablo: Hellfire expansion pack in 1997, and a sequel, Diablo II, in 2000. Diablo II received its own expansion, Diablo II: Lord of Destruction, in 2001. Diablo, Diablo II, Diablo II: Lord of Destruction and the Diablo II strategy guide were bundled together in stores as parts of the Diablo Battle Chest; and appeared on the NPD Group's top 10 PC games sales list as recently as 2010. A third game, Diablo III, was announced on June 28, 2008, and released on May 15, 2012. Examples of "Diablo clones" include Fate (2005), Sacred (2004), Torchlight (2009), Din's Curse (2011), Hellgate: London (2007) and Path of Exile (2013). (Note: Hellgate: London was developed by a team headed by former Blizzard employees, some of whom had participated in the development of the Diablo series.) Like Diablo and Rogue before them, Torchlight, Din's Curse, Hellgate: London, Fate and Path of Exile used procedural generation to create new game levels dynamically.

=== Interplay, BioWare and Black Isle Studios ===
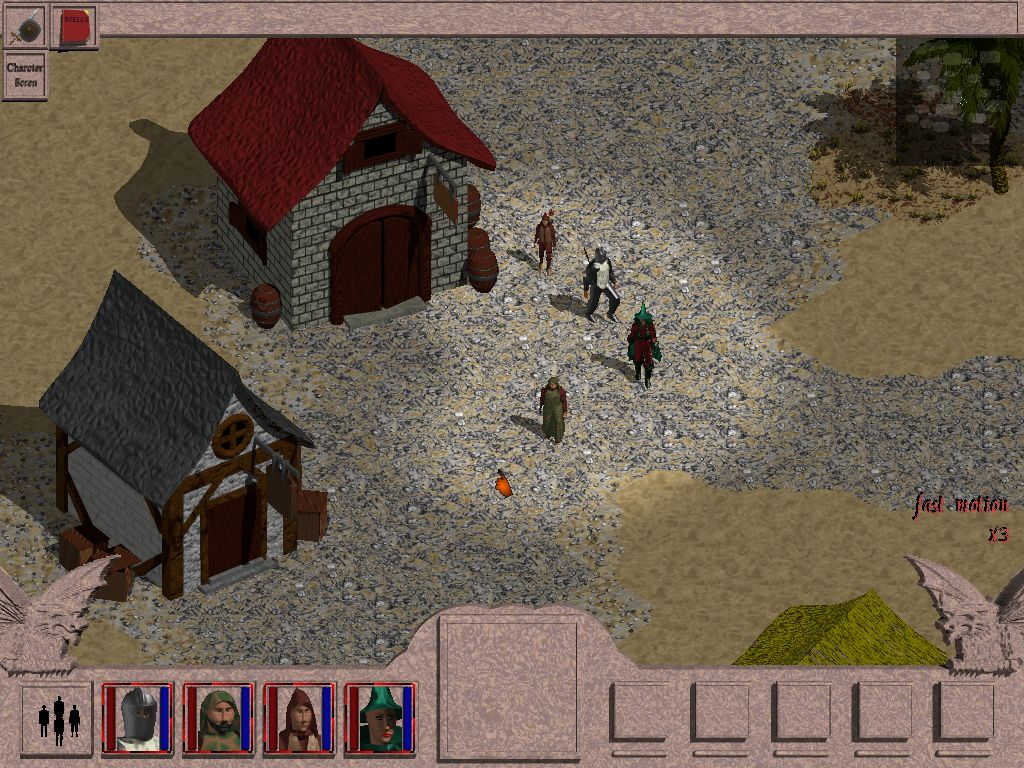
Blizzard Entertainment and Interplay Entertainment helped popularize the use of an overhead, isometric view in their CRPGs during the mid-to-late 1990s and onward. Pictured here is the open source isometric fantasy RPG Tales of Trolls & Treasures.

Interplay, now known as Interplay Entertainment and a publisher in its own right, produced several late 1990s RPG titles through two new developers, Black Isle Studios and BioWare. Black Isle released the groundbreaking Fallout (1997) which, reminiscent of Interplay's earlier Wasteland, was set in an alternate history future America following a nuclear holocaust. One of the few successful late-1990 video game RPGs not set in a swords-and-sorcery environment, Fallout was notable for its open-ended and largely nonlinear gameplay and quest system, tongue-in-cheek humor, and pervasive sense of style. Players were afforded numerous moral choices to shape the game world based on how NPCs might react to the player, much like the original Ultimas. Fallout was nearly as influential on post-crash RPGs as Ultima was on Golden Age RPGs, and is considered by some to be the first "modern" CRPG. Black Isle produced a sequel, Fallout 2, co-designed by Chris Avellone in 1998. Third-party developer Micro Forté created Fallout Tactics: Brotherhood of Steel, a tactical RPG based on the franchise, which was published in 2001 under Interplay's strategy division 14 Degrees East.

BioWare's Baldur's Gate series was no less important, being the most significant D&D series to be released since the Gold Box era. The games created the most accurate and in-depth D&D simulation to date, and featured support for up to six players in cooperative mode. Baldur's Gate (1998) provided an epic story with NPC followers and written dialogue that continued through both titles and two expansion packs. Black Isle produced a more combat-oriented series, Icewind Dale, using the same engine soon afterwards; and followed it up with 1999's Planescape: Torment. The critically acclaimed D&D title became known for its moody, artistic air and extensive writing and player choices. Together, Interplay's Fallout, Planescape: Torment and Baldur's Gate series are considered by critics to be some of the finest CRPGs ever made.

I think there are a few reasons for Fallout's success. It gave you tremendous freedom to let you wander wherever you chose. This freedom—to take whatever quests you want and solve them however you choose—is what an RPG was always supposed to be about.

— Chris Avellone, co-designer of Fallout 2 and lead designer of Planescape: Torment

Black Isle's games during this time period often shared engines to cut down on development time and costs, and most feature an overhead axonometrically projected third-person interface. Their titles, apart from the two Fallout games, used various versions of the Infinity Engine that had been developed by BioWare for Baldur's Gate. Interplay's collapse resulted in the shutdown of Black Isle and the cancellation of the third games in both the Fallout and Baldur's Gate series, as well as of an original title, Torn. Instead, they published a trio of console-only action RPGs, Baldur's Gate: Dark Alliance (2001), Baldur's Gate: Dark Alliance II (2004), and Fallout: Brotherhood of Steel (2004). One of the last CRPGs released before Interplay went defunct was the poorly received Lionheart: Legacy of the Crusader (2003) by developer Reflexive Entertainment, notable for using the SPECIAL system introduced by Fallout.

== Mainstream success (2000s–present) ==
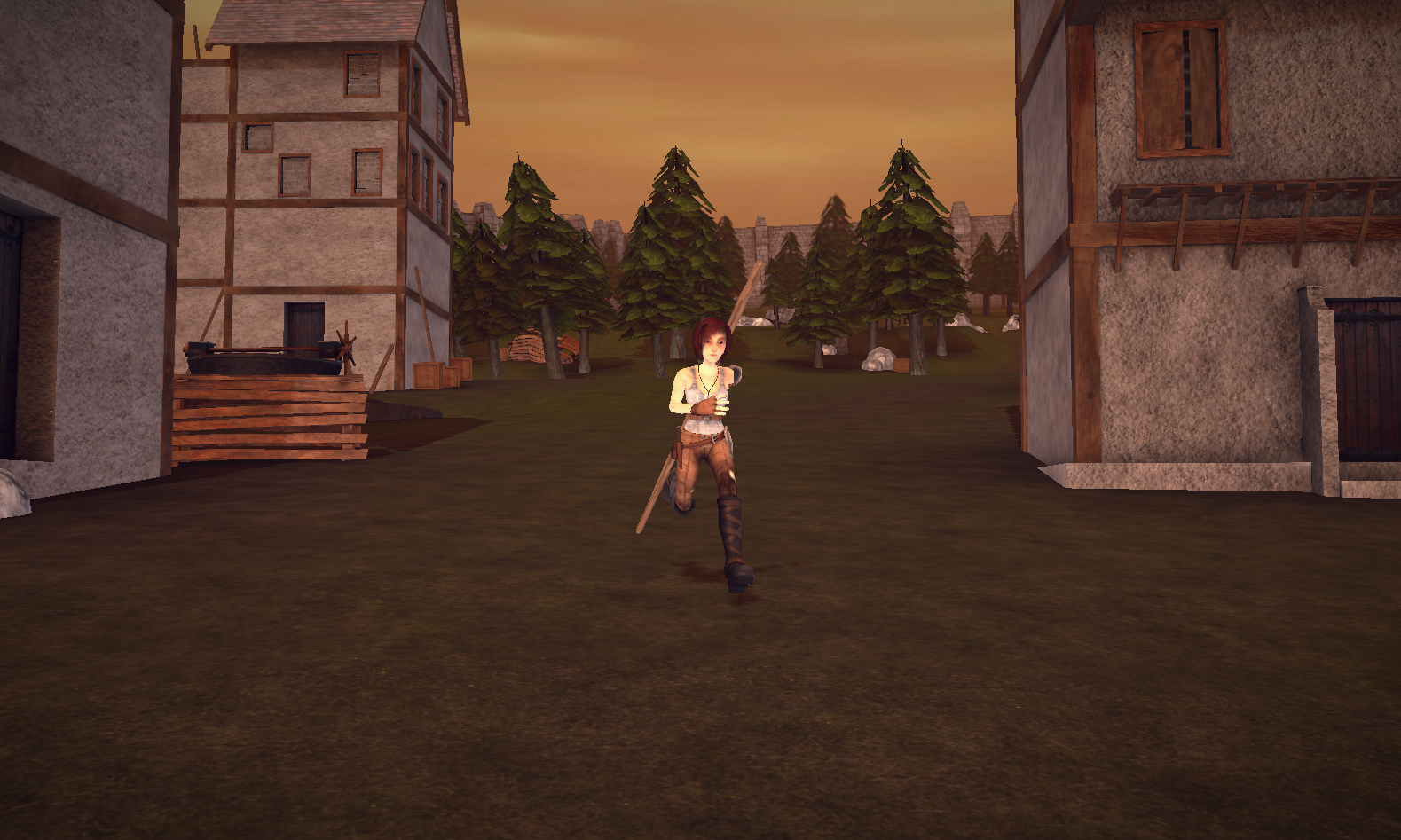
Starting in the mid-1990s with the advent of 3D graphics accelerators, real-time first- and third-person polygonal graphics became commonplace in CRPGs. Pictured here is Sintel The Game.

The new century saw an increasing number of multi-platform releases. The move to 3D game engines, along with constant improvements in graphic quality, led to progressively more detailed and realistic game worlds.

BioWare produced Neverwinter Nights (2002) for Atari, the first CRPG to fuse the third-edition Dungeons & Dragons rules with a 3D display in which the user could vary the viewing angle and distance. New game content could be generated using the Aurora toolset supplied as part of the game release, and players could share their modules and play cooperatively with friends online. Based in part on experiences while playing Ultima Online, one of the goals during development was to reproduce the feel of a live pen-and-paper RPG experience, complete with a human Dungeon Master. Neverwinter Nights (NWN) was very successful commercially, and spawned three official expansion packs and a sequel developed by Obsidian Entertainment. BioWare later produced the acclaimed Star Wars: Knights of the Old Republic, which married the d20 system with the Star Wars franchise; as well as the original Jade Empire (2005), Mass Effect (2007–2012) and Dragon Age (2009–2014) series, all which were released for multiple platforms. With the Mass Effect and the Dragon Age titles, Bioware also utilized a save import system where decisions in the earlier games impact the story in the later games.

During the production of Fallout 2, several of Black Isle's key members left the studio to form Troika Games, citing disagreements with the development team structure. The new studio's first title was Arcanum: Of Steamworks and Magick Obscura (2001), an original, nonlinear steampunk-themed RPG with fantasy elements. Several Arcanum designers worked on Fallout, and the two titles share an aesthetic and sense of humor. Arcanum was followed by The Temple of Elemental Evil (2003), based on the Dungeons & Dragons 3.5 Edition rules and set in the Greyhawk universe; and Vampire: The Masquerade – Bloodlines (2004), based on White Wolf's Vampire: The Masquerade. All three games received positive reviews—as well as cult followings— but were criticized for shipping with numerous bugs. Troika's reputation became "Great Ideas. Never Enough Testing", and by 2005 the studio was in financial trouble, no longer able to secure funding for additional titles. Most of the developers left for other studios.

When Black Isle closed down, several employees formed Obsidian Entertainment, who released Star Wars: Knights of the Old Republic II – The Sith Lords (2005), a sequel to BioWare's successful Star Wars: Knights of the Old Republic. Obsidian later created a sequel to another BioWare game: Neverwinter Nights 2 was released on Halloween of 2006, and featured the 3.5 Edition D&D ruleset. It was followed by two expansions and an "adventure pack", in 2007 and 2008. Obsidian Entertainment began development of a role-playing game based on the Alien film franchise in 2006, but it was canceled, along with an original title under the working name of Seven Dwarves. Obsidian's most recent RPGs are The Outer Worlds (2019), a sci-fi game set in an alternate future, released for multiple platforms, and Pillars of Eternity II: Deadfire (2018). The company released Dungeon Siege III on June 17, 2011. Obsidian Entertainment is now a subsidiary of Microsoft Studios.

=== Bethesda ===
Bethesda Softworks has developed RPGs since 1994, in its epic fantasy The Elder Scrolls series. Daggerfall (1996) is notable as an early 3D first-person RPG with an expansive world. The series drew attention to sandbox gameplay, which gives the player wide choices of free-roaming activities unrelated to the game's main storyline. The Elder Scrolls series was seen as an alternative to the "highly linear, story-based games" that dominated the computer RPG genre at the time, and the series' freedom of play inspired comparisons to Grand Theft Auto III. According to Todd Howard, "I think [Daggerfall is] one of those games that people can 'project' themselves on. It does so many things and allows [for] so many play styles that people can easily imagine what type of person they'd like to be in-game."

The series' popularity exploded with the release of The Elder Scrolls III: Morrowind (2002), for the Xbox and PC. Morrowind became a successful and award-winning RPG due to its open-ended play, richly detailed game world, and flexibility in character creation and advancement. Two expansions were released: Tribunal in 2002 and Bloodmoon in 2003. The Elder Scrolls IV: Oblivion (2006), released for the Xbox 360 and PlayStation 3 as well as the PC, was an enhanced sequel that featured scripted NPC behaviors, significantly improved graphics, and the company's first foray into micro transactions, an emerging trend among Western RPG makers. Two expansion packs, Shivering Isles and Knights of the Nine, were developed, as were several smaller downloadable packages, each costing between $1–3. Oblivion's immediate successor, The Elder Scrolls V: Skyrim, was released to wide critical acclaim on November 11, 2011 and remains one of the bestselling video games to date, with over 40 million sold copies.

Interplay's decision to scrap plans for Fallout 3 and Bethesda's subsequent acquisition of the Fallout brand created mixed feelings among the series' small but vocal fan community as well as "hardcore" PC gamers. Problems cited included the number of lackluster additions to the series since the release of the original two games, as well as a perceived track record on the part of Bethesda for simplifying and streamlining its own franchises in order to appeal to a wider audience (a.k.a. "dumbing down"). Nevertheless, Bethesda released Fallout 3 in North America on October 28, 2008 to wide acclaim and much fanfare, and the game was quickly followed by five "content packs" and several additional sequels and spin-offs. Fallout: New Vegas (2010), created by Obsidian Entertainment and using the same engine as Fallout 3, was released to generally favorable reviews but would later go on to become a cult classic. Fallout 4, released in 2015, featured improved graphics and gunplay, and for the first time in the series a "voiced" protagonist. Fallout 76, released in 2018, featured online-only multiplayer modes and survival crafting mechanics.

=== Video game consoles and accessibility ===
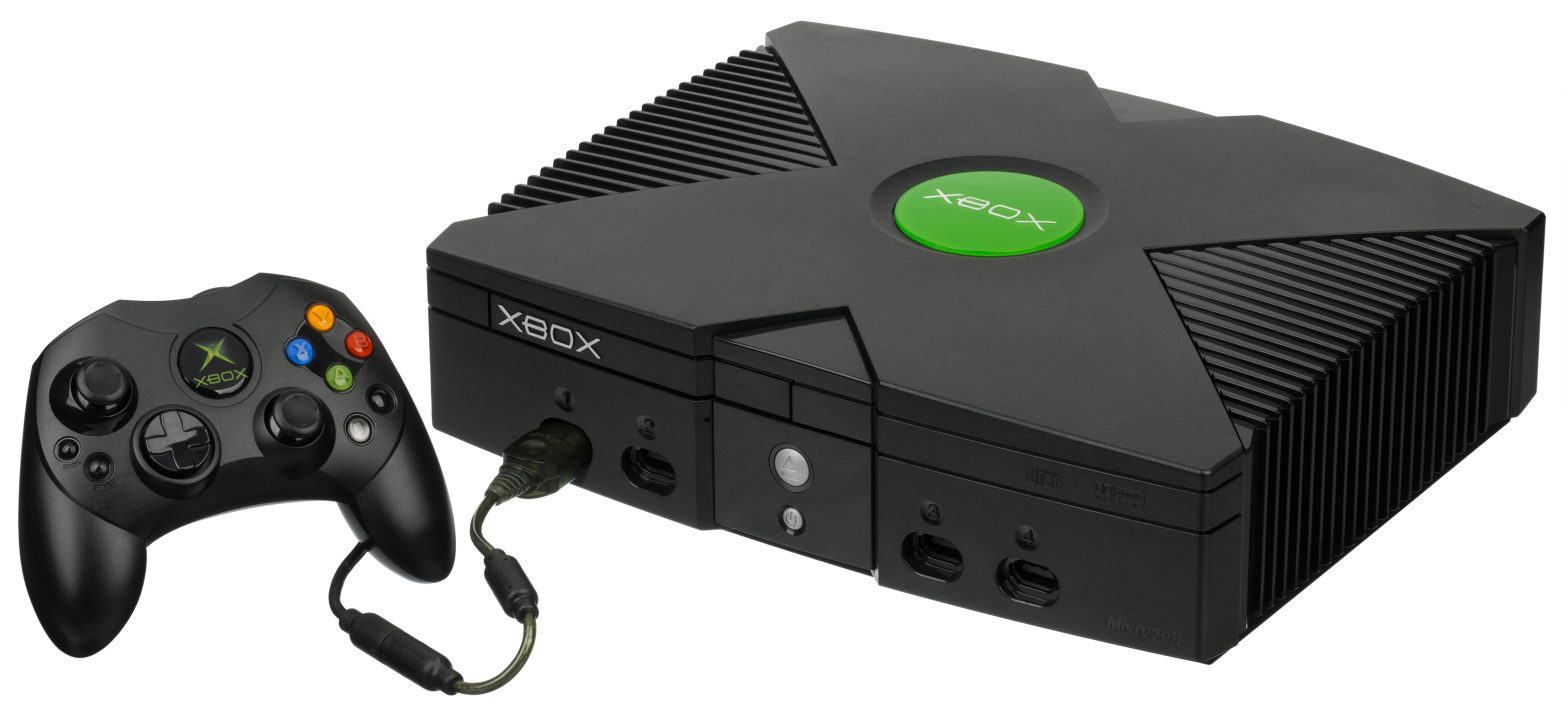
The Microsoft Xbox sixth-generation gaming console

Multi-platform releases were common in the early days of RPGs, but there was a period during the 1990s when this was not generally the case. The sixth generation of home gaming consoles led many game developers to resume this practice, and some opted to develop primarily or exclusively for consoles. The combination of the Xbox and DirectX technologies proved especially popular due to the two systems' architectural similarities, as well as their common set of development tools. Multimedia and art assets, which account for a greater proportion of a game's development budget today than in the past, are also easily transferable between multiple platforms.

Development for multiple platforms is profitable, but difficult. Optimizations needed for one platform architecture do not necessarily translate well to others. Legacy platforms such as the Sega Genesis and PlayStation 3 were seen as difficult to develop for compared to their competitors, and even today developers are still not yet fully comfortable with new technologies such as multi-core processors and hyper-threading. Multi-platform releases are increasingly common, but not all similarities between game editions can be fully explained by game design alone. Rather, they can often be attributed to developers' lack of willingness to support all the optimizations needed to expose a single platform's full potential.

There remain franchise stalwarts that exist solely on one system, however. Developers for handheld and mobile systems in particular are seen as being able to get away with more since they are not forced to operate under the pressures of $20 million budgets and scrutiny from publishers' marketing departments to the same degree as other console game developers. Nintendo, credited with popularizing the handheld console concept with the release of the Game Boy in 1989, has recently combined its TV and handheld consoles into a single device, however.

Several major PC RPG titles have been affected by multi-platform releases, mostly due to console exclusivity publishing deals with Microsoft. BioWare's Star Wars: Knights of the Old Republic was developed primarily for the Xbox, and not ported to the PC until several months later. Their original IP, Jade Empire (2005) was also an Xbox exclusive, and did not receive a Windows version until Jade Empire – Special Edition (which included bonus content) in 2007. Obsidian's KOTOR sequel was released in December 2004 for the Xbox, followed by a PC version in February 2005; and Fable (2004) by Lionhead Studios did not receive a PC port until its reissue as a Platinum Hit in 2005. Fable II (2008) and Fable III (2010) were platform exclusives when they were released, as well.

Sequels to many of the titles previously mentioned in this article have also been developed for next-gen console systems. The Fallout and Baldur's Gate series of PC RPGs spawned console-friendly, Diablo-style action titles for the PS2 and Xbox as their respective PC series ended. (Note: Fallout: Brotherhood of Steel (2004), and Baldur's Gate: Dark Alliance (2001), namely.) Bethesda's The Elder Scrolls IV: Oblivion was released simultaneously for console and PC, but was considered a major launch title for the Xbox 360 and PlayStation 3. BioWare continued to produce launch-exclusive RPG titles for the Xbox 360, such as Mass Effect (2007). They also produced the multi-platform Dragon Age series starting in 2009.

[Console gamers] don't have the patience to wade through the introduction of [new] systems. [...] [Y]ou need to ease them in a bit more [...] [But] once they're into the game, the console guys want just as deep of an experience as the PC guys.

— Ken Levine and Todd Howard in a 2010 interview

This change in focus away from the PC platform to console systems has met with criticism, due to the concessions required to adapt games to the altered interfaces and control systems, as well as a perceived need to make games "accessible" to a wider demographic. (A process referred to variously as "dumbing down" or "console-itis" by vocal detractors.) Developer Josh Sawyer of Obsidian Entertainment lamented the decline of high-profile computer-exclusive RPGs, and claimed that the collapse of Troika Games meant that there were "no pure CRPG developers left", outside of small companies like Spiderweb Software. According to video game historian and vlogger Matt Barton, "Successful CRPGs of modern times often seem more like action adventures or first-person shooters than anything ever released by Origin." Other criticisms include the increasing emphasis on video quality and voiceovers, and their detrimental effect on development budgets and the amount and quality of dialogue created for games. Lastly, there are concerns over the games' narrative and writing styles. Once considered the "savior" of the Western RPG following the CRPG drought of the mid-1990s, BioWare shed the novel-like writing style and other conventions of Western RPGs with Mass Effect. Instead, it replaced these conventions with the more cinematic style and streamlined action of Japanese console RPGs such as Final Fantasy and other video game genres. While constituting a major departure from established practice, and—along with other factors—raising questions as to whether games like Mass Effect are actually RPGs, BioWare's success as a company has been attributed to successfully "marrying Western mechanics with Japanese-style character interactions".

There have been other less subtle shifts away from the core influences of Dungeons & Dragons that existed in the 1980s and 1990s, as well. Games that were originally closely tied to the system's basic mechanics such as dice rolls and turn-based tactical combat, have begun moving in the direction of real-time modes, simplified mechanics and skill-based interfaces. (Note: Examples include Mass Effect 2's lack of inventory system and Alpha Protocol's Dialogue Effect System.) Some argue Dungeons & Dragons itself has diverged from its table-top roots, with the 4th Edition D&D rules being compared to video games such as World of Warcraft and Fire Emblem. (Note: E.g., whereas pen-and-paper RPGs previously would influence their video game counterparts, the reverse according to some people appears to be occurring today.) Other people have even accused certain real-time RPGs (within the contexts of their respective franchises and genres) and board games of being "dumbed-down" by their creators. Nevertheless, even as non-role-playing game genres have adopted more and more RPG elements, developers and publishers continue to be concerned that the term "role-playing game" and its association with complicated pen-and-paper rules systems such as D&D may alienate a significant number of players.

=== Indie and European game studios ===
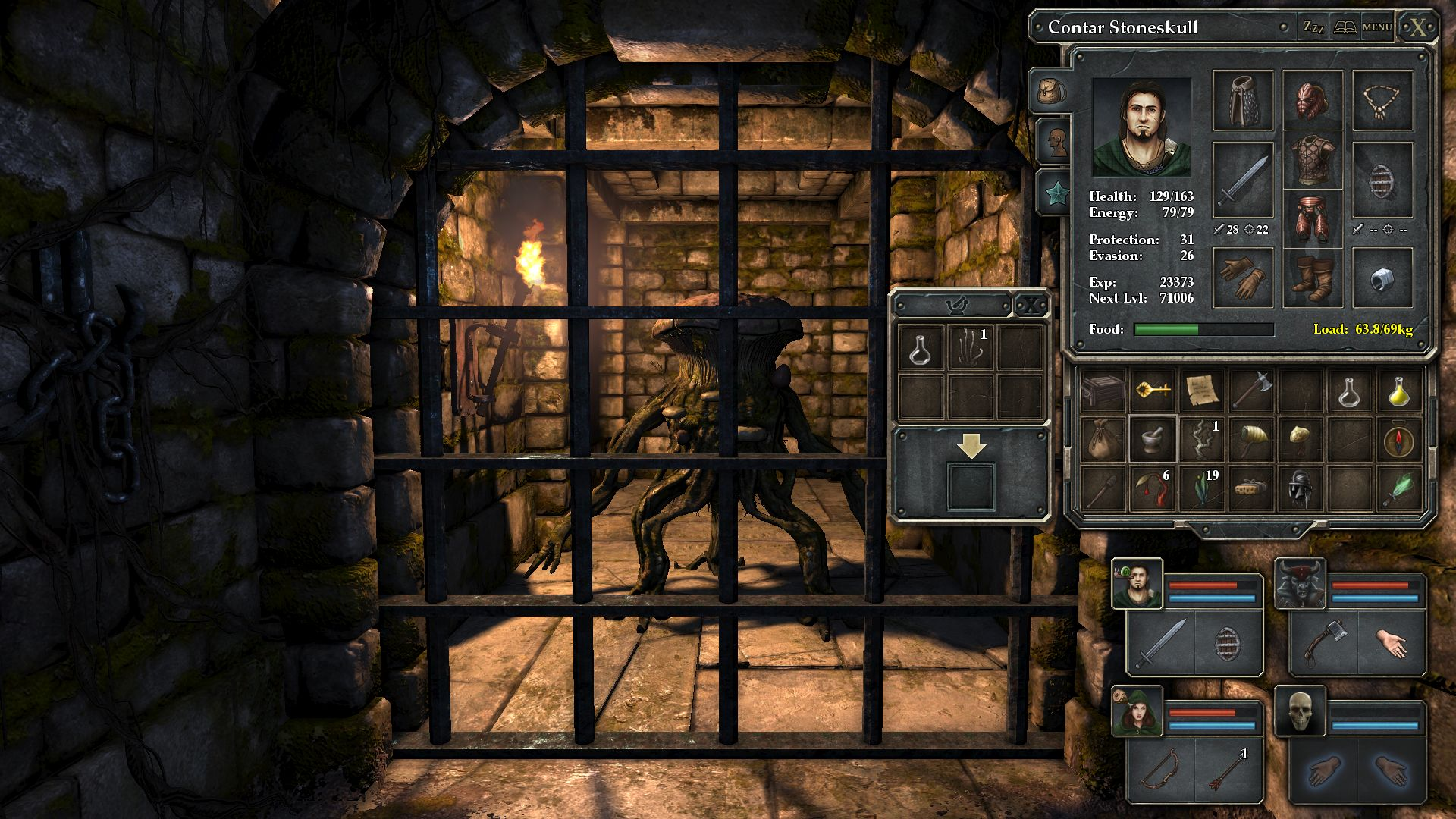
An in-game screenshot of Legend of Grimrock, a real-time, first person view, tile-based dungeon crawler in the style of Dungeon Master

The technical sophistication required to make modern video games and the high expectations of players (at least, in terms of the number and quality of voice-overs and increasing graphical fidelity) make it difficult for independent developers to impress audiences to the same degree that large game makers with extensive budgets and development teams are able to. (Note: Though managed development environments such as Microsoft's XNA platform and GarageGames' Torque engine are meant to make this easier.) But innovation and quality need not necessarily be stymied. Like the movie industry, the "indie" (short for "independent") video game scene plays a crucial role in formulating new ideas and concepts that mainstream publishers and marketing departments, stuck in their rigid antiquated ways, might deem too unworkable or radical, but later adopt. There are many examples of movies that never gained approval within a corporate framework that ended up being financially successful and/or iconic among filmgoers. Likewise, "indie" video game developers are able to be successful by putting development time and effort into aspects of a game larger corporate enterprises might ignore. Lastly, independent developers can be successful by focusing on smaller niche markets. European countries, and Germany in particular, remain more receptive to PC-exclusives and, to older, more "hardcore" design decisions, in general.

The new millennium saw a number of independently published RPGs for the PC, as well as a number of CRPGs developed in Europe and points farther east, leading some to call Eastern Europe a "hotbed" of RPG development in recent years. (Note: Russia also happens to be Europe's largest video games market, though the country ranks behind the UK and Germany in total video games sales.) Examples of independently produced RPGs include Spiderweb Software's Geneforge (2001–2009) and Avernum (2000–2010) series; Pyrrhic Tales: Prelude to Darkness (2002) by Zero Sum Software; Eschalon: Book I (2007) and Book II (2010) by Basilisk Games; Depths of Peril (2007) and Din's Curse (2010) by Soldak Entertainment; Knights of the Chalice (2009) by Heroic Games; and Underrail (2015) by Stygian Software. Examples of Central and Eastern European RPGs include Belgian developer Larian Studios' Divinity series (2002–2017); Russian developer Nival Interactive's series of tactical RPGs, starting with Silent Storm (2003); German developer Ascaron Entertainment's Sacred series of action RPGs (2004–2014); and Polish developer Reality Pump's Two Worlds (2007) and Two Worlds 2 (2010). Hybrid RPGs include Russian developer Elemental Games' multi-genre Space Rangers (2002) and Space Rangers 2: Dominators (2004); Ukrainian developer GSC Game World's hybrid survival horror RPG/first-person shooter S.T.A.L.K.E.R.: Shadow of Chernobyl (2007); Turkish developer TaleWorlds' hybrid series of RPG/medieval combat simulators, starting with Mount & Blade (2008); and Toby Fox's console game-inspired RPG, Undertale (2015).

The critically acclaimed Gothic series, by German developer Piranha Bytes, first appeared in 2001. Lauded for its complex interaction with other in-game characters and attractive graphics, it was nonetheless criticized for its difficult control scheme and high system requirements. The third game in particular was notable for its performance issues at the time. Piranha Bytes split from publisher JoWood Productions in 2007, due to a contract dispute between the two companies. JoWooD retained the rights to the Gothic name and to current and future games released under that trademark. Piranha Bytes have since gone on to develop the Risen series (2009–2014) with publisher Deep Silver, and ELEX (2017) with publisher THQ Nordic. A fourth, "casual" installment of the Gothic series, this time by developer Spellbound Entertainment, was published by JoWood in 2010. This was followed by an expansion in 2011. The rights to the Gothic series may have reverted to Piranha Bytes following the release of Risen II in 2012.

The Finnish independent development studio Almost Human released Legend of Grimrock, a Dungeon Master-inspired game, in 2012. A reboot of the long-abandoned tile-based dungeon-crawler sub-genre, it was a commercial success that reached the top of Steam's "Top Sellers list" in April of that year. The Estonian development house ZA/UM released Disco Elysium to wide critical acclaim in 2019. Set in a large city still recovering from a war decades prior to the game's start, it features players taking the role of an amnesic detective charged with solving a murder mystery, who comes to recall events about his own past as well as current forces trying to affect the city. It won numerous awards, including "Best Narrative", "Best Independent Game", "Best Role-Playing Game" and "Fresh Indie Game" at The Game Awards 2019 held in Los Angeles. Esoteric Ebb (2026) was created by an independent developer who reworked his existing RPG into one modeled after Disco Elysium when it was released.

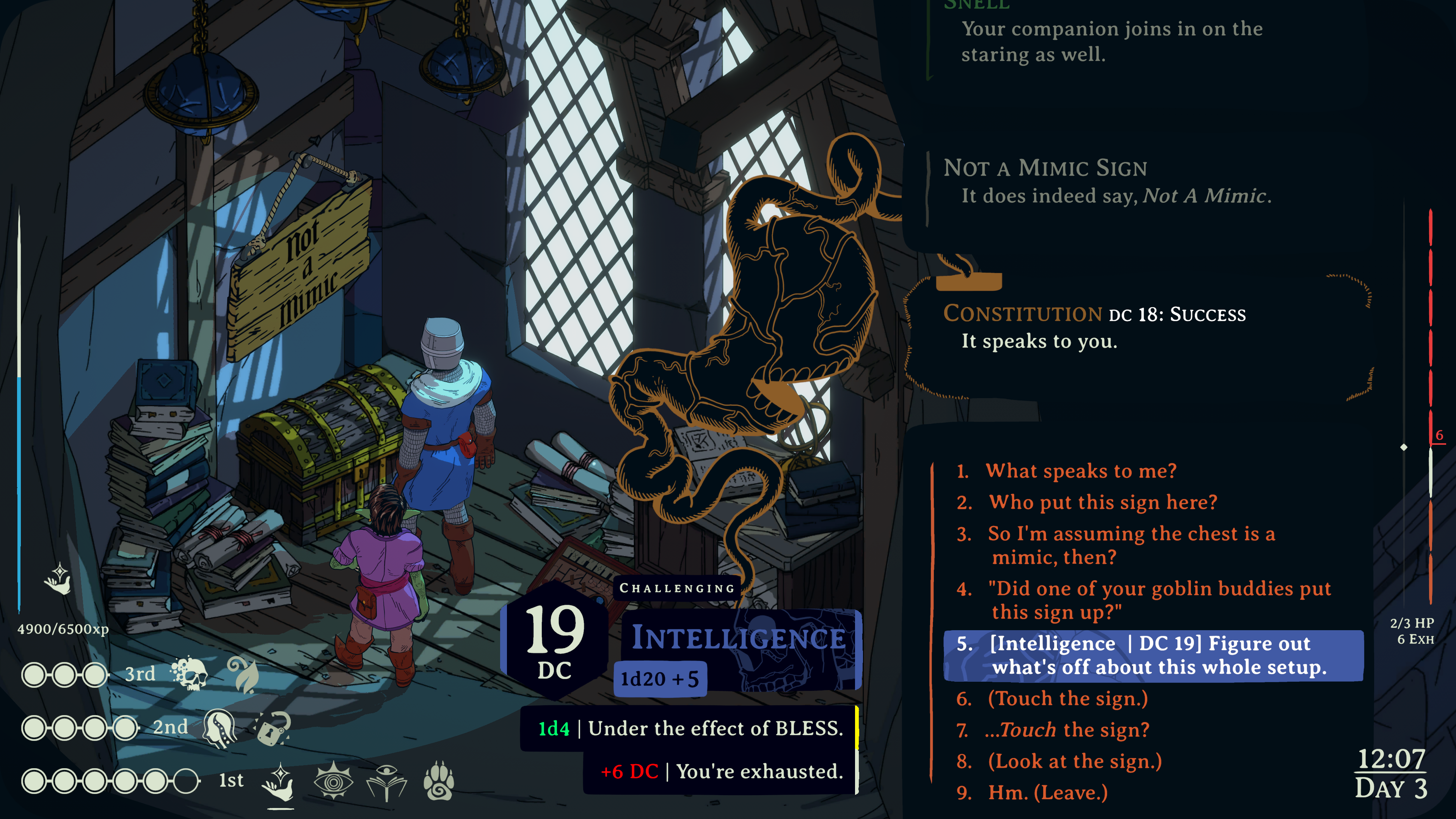
A view of an Esoteric Ebb dialog tree

Examples exist of developers leaving larger studios to form their own, independent development houses, as well. For instance, in 2009, a pair of developers left Obsidian Entertainment to form DoubleBear Productions, and began development of the post-apocalyptic zombie tactical RPG, Dead State (2014), using Iron Tower Studios' The Age of Decadence (2015) game engine. Three employees left BioWare in 2012 to form Stoic Studio and develop the tactical RPG The Banner Saga (2014) and its sequels. Dead State and The Banner Saga were both supported in part by the public through the crowdfunding website Kickstarter, a recent trend among independent video game developers. Other examples of crowdfunded tactical RPGs include inXile Entertainment's Wasteland sequels (2014, 2020); and Harebrained Schemes' Shadowrun Returns (2013–2015) and BattleTech (2018) series.

Iron Tower Studios later went on to create Dungeon Rats (2016), a tactical RPG spin-off to The Age of Decadence. Their latest title, Colony Ship: A Post-Earth Role Playing Game, a Fallout homage, was released on 9 November 2023, with reviewers noting its increased complexity and difficulty compared to other similar RPGs.

=== CD Projekt Red ===
CD Projekt Red, best known for The Witcher series (2007–2015) and Cyberpunk 2077 (2020), was formed in 2002 in Warsaw by Polish video game retailers Marcin Iwiński and Michał Kiciński. The company began by translating major video-game releases into Polish, collaborating with Interplay Entertainment on two Baldur's Gate titles. When Baldur's Gate: Dark Alliance was cancelled, the company decided to reuse the code for their own video game, The Witcher, based on the works of Andrzej Sapkowski. After the release of The Witcher, CD Projekt worked on a console port called The Witcher: White Wolf; but development issues and increasing costs led the company to the brink of bankruptcy. CD Projekt later released The Witcher 2: Assassins of Kings in 2011 and The Witcher 3: Wild Hunt in 2015, with the latter winning various Game of the Year awards. In 2020, the company released Cyberpunk 2077, open-world role-playing game based on the Cyberpunk 2020 tabletop game system, for which it opened a new division in Wrocław.

Much-anticipated after a several-years-long wait, Cyberpunk 2077 received considerable praise for its narrative, setting, and graphics, although several of its gameplay elements received mixed reviews. After viewing a pre-release trailer, however, writer William Gibson, credited with pioneering the cyberpunk genre, remarked that the game seemed like "GTA skinned-over with a generic 80s retro-future", although he later expressed an affinity toward the first gameplay demo. Its themes and representation of transgender characters also received scrutiny. Further, Cyberpunk 2077 was widely criticized for bugs, particularly in the console versions which suffered from severe performance issues. (Sony removed the game from the PlayStation Store soon after release.) Later, CD Projekt would become subject to investigations and class-action lawsuits for their perceived attempts in downplaying the severity of the game's technical issues prior to its release.

== See also ==
- History of Eastern role-playing video games
- Cultural differences in role-playing video games
- List of role-playing video games

== Bibliography ==
- Barton, Matt (February 23, 2007). "The History of Computer Role-Playing Games Part 1: The Early Years (1980–1983)". Gamasutra. UBM TechWeb.
- Barton, Matt (February 23, 2007). "The History of Computer Role-Playing Games Part 2: The Golden Age (1985–1993)". Gamasutra. UBM TechWeb.
- Barton, Matt (April 11, 2007). "The History of Computer Role-Playing Games Part III: The Platinum and Modern Ages (1994–2004)". Gamasutra. UBM TechWeb. Archived from the original on October 27, 2007.
- Loguidice, Bill; Barton, Matt (2009), Vintage Games: An Insider Look at the History of Grand Theft Auto, Super Mario, and the Most Influential Games of All Time, Focal Press, ISBN 978-0-240-81146-8
- Barton, Matt (2008). Dungeons & Desktops: The History of Computer Role-Playing Games. A K Peters, Ltd. ISBN 978-1-56881-411-7.
- King, Brad; Borland, John M. (2003). Dungeons and Dreamers: The Rise of Computer Game Culture from Geek to Chic. McGraw-Hill/Osborne. ISBN 0-07-222888-1.
- Harris, John (July 2, 2009). "Game Design Essentials: 20 RPGs". Gamasutra. UBM TechWeb.
- Pepe, Felipe, ed. (2019). The CRPG Book: A Guide to Computer Role-Playing Games. Bitmap Books. ISBN 978-1999353308.
