= CRPG (disambiguation) =

CRPG is an abbreviation for a computer role-playing game, also known as a role-playing video game.

CRPG may also refer to:

== Video games ==
- Console role-playing game
- Chinese role-playing game

== Other uses ==
- Canadian Ranger, a patrol group

== See also ==
- Turn-based role-playing game
- Western role-playing games
- Japanese role-playing games
- Isometric RPG
