= Brian Mitsoda =

American video game designer and writer

- Other names: B. Mitsoda, b mitsoda
- Occupation: Video game designer
- Known for: Vampire: The Masquerade – Bloodlines

Brian Mitsoda (also credited as B. Mitsoda and b mitsoda) is an American video game designer and writer best known for his work on the 2004 game Vampire: The Masquerade – Bloodlines. He is the founder of DoubleBear Productions.

== Biography ==
=== Early career and Black Isle Studios ===
Brian Mitsoda earned a B.A. in English at Florida State University in 1997, moving out to Los Angeles to pursue a career writing for television and film. After playing the game Fallout, he was inspired enough to look up the developer and apply for a job. This resulted in him entering the game industry as a quality assurance tester at Interplay in 1999.

Shortly thereafter, he was promoted to designer/writer at Black Isle Studios, and took on the role of lead writer for TORN, a PC RPG that used Monolith's Lithtech engine, and a modified version of Fallout's SPECIAL system. However, the title was cancelled in July 2001.

=== Troika and Obsidian ===
Around mid-to-late 2002, Mitsoda joined Troika Games, where he designed and wrote the story for Vampire: The Masquerade – Bloodlines, which gained a very positive reception for the quality of its characters, writing, and voice work (of which Mitsoda himself provided multiple uncredited performances). Among the characters that Brian Mitsoda has both written and provided dialogue for in Vampire: The Masquerade – Bloodlines are the ghoul Romero, the elderly hitman Ji Wen Ja, the newscaster and multiple voices on the in-game radio (including one in the infamous "Frickin' Chicken" commercial).

After the collapse of Troika, Mitsoda moved on to work at Obsidian Entertainment, where he worked on a cancelled role-playing game project codenamed New Jersey, provided feedback on several expansions for Neverwinter Nights 2, and worked as a creative lead on a version of Alpha Protocol. There exists some controversy regarding Mitsoda's role in creating Alpha Protocol: while he has been credited with the development of the game's dialogue system (known in the shorthand as "DSS"), characters (along with designer Annie VanderMeer), and an earlier complete draft of the script, he has since stated that all of his work has since been removed from the game. He has publicly stated:

...for good or ill, I have nothing to do with Alpha Protocol as it is being developed currently. I was working on the creative direction, story, and dialogue for previous iterations of the game, but outside of a dialogue system I created (before Mass Effect was announced) for an earlier version of the game, my (and Annie Carlson’s) original dialogue and plot – again, for good or ill – are not being used for the game. Any characters I’m attributed with creating bear only a superficial resemblance to the ones in my original story.

=== DoubleBear Productions ===
Mitsoda is currently living and working in Seattle. In June 2009, he opened a new development studio, DoubleBear Productions. Their first project was Dead State, a turn-based RPG set during a zombie apocalypse developed with the aid of fellow indie game company Iron Tower Studio. Mitsoda has said that an aim of the game was to be a "[s]erious examination of a national crisis or natural disaster" and that the game is "designed around" the "stress and survival aspects" of "a world in crisis". Dead State was released on December 4, 2014, and followed up with numerous free updates, culminating in the Reanimated update on May 13, 2015, which acted as a kind of definitive edition. He worked as a writer on DoubleBear's second project, PANIC at Multiverse High!.

== Other works ==
In 2011, Mitsoda released a book of his "One Sentence Stories," a humor book in which stories are told in only one sentence.

In March 2013, it was announced that he would work with inXile Entertainment as a writer on Torment: Tides of Numenera.

From 2015, Mitsoda worked with Hardsuit Labs on Vampire: The Masquerade – Bloodlines 2 as narrative lead; in July 2020, he and creative director Ka'ai Cluney were terminated from their positions in a joint decision by Hardsuit Labs and the game's publisher Paradox Interactive, which Mitsoda called sudden, unexpected and disappointing.

Mitsoda has been working with Hungarian studio Primal Games on 2.5D soulslike Mandragora.
