= Dead State =

2014 video game

- Logo
- Developers: DoubleBear Productions; Iron Tower Studio
- Publisher: DoubleBear Productions
- Producer: Christina Ramey
- Designers: Brian Mitsoda; Annie Mitsoda
- Programmers: Nick Skolozdra; Jonathan Chan
- Artist: Oscar Velzi
- Writers: Brian Mitsoda; Annie Mitsoda
- Composer: Lena Raine
- Engine: Torque 3D
- Platform: Windows
- Release: December 4, 2014; Reanimated; May 13, 2015
- Genres: Role-playing, survival horror
- Mode: Single-player

Dead State is a turn-based survival horror role-playing video game developed by DoubleBear Productions and Iron Tower Studio set in a zombie apocalypse scenario. Players are tasked with leading a group of survivors living in a shelter in the fictional town of Splendid, Texas. Dead State was released in December 2014 after having been in Early Access since spring of that year. DoubleBear Productions continued to work on the title and in May 2015 released an "enhanced edition" which changed the name to Dead State: Reanimated.

== Gameplay ==
Dead State splits its time between scavenging - where the player explores the environment for food, fuel, luxury items, medical supplies, and antibiotics - and base management back at the Shelter - assigning jobs, building upgrades, creating items, and interacting with fellow survivors. Standard action in Dead State is in real-time, switching into turn-based mode when combat initiates.

=== Character creation ===
Character Creation consists of two stages. Initially, the player chooses their character's gender, 3D appearance, portrait (either from a pre-generated list, uploading an image, or using the custom portrait generator), and name. After this, the player has a choice of either selecting an archetype that fits a certain play style, or distributing character points manually.

=== Character advancement ===
Players are able to advance their skills and stats not by killing creatures, but by completing various goals, such as investigating areas, collecting a certain amount of food, resolving a conflict, and so on. Ally characters gain 1 skill point for each day they're at the Shelter, which are automatically distributed based on their preset character personalities. While the player is unable to distribute their points, for some allies, they are able to influence the development of some ally characters based upon their actions.

The maximum level for character development is capped at 20 - by this point, the character will also have reached 170 attribute points. Players may also choose to do certain quests to gain another 30 attribute points, making the maximum points available 200. Experience can still be gained and is used to learn more skills or buy consumable items throughout the game.

=== Combat ===
Combat in Dead State is fully turn-based, utilizing an Action Point system that draws from a character's Agility stat, and relies on character initiative to determine turn order. It also employs a "Line of Sight" scenario - if no allies or enemies can see each other, they do not appear on the map. Once one is sighted, they appear - but combat does not initiate until the enemy either detects the player or an ally, or the player manually initiates combat.

The player character can select up to three other characters to accompany in the field: early builds of the game experimented with AI-controlled allies, but the end product had fully controllable ally characters. The game also features perma-death, meaning that if one of your allies is killed, they stay dead, and there is no way to revive them. However, if the player character is killed, the game is over.

Dead State features combat against both the undead and other factions of human enemies. While undead only come in two forms - walkers and crawlers - they move at a uniform rate, and are not very dangerous in small numbers. Both allies and enemies can be infected if they are pulled down by the undead and attacked while their health is low, and when killed, infected characters will reanimate as zombies themselves. (Players cannot be infected unless they choose the "Player Infection" mode in the Reanimated update.) Human enemies are far more dangerous, falling into a variety of factions from frightened looters to biker gangs to rogue military - each with their own varying stat and skill levels, weapons, and items.

There are both melee and ranged weapons: any character can use any weapon, but their skill with it will depend on the applicable stats and skills for each (Melee - Strength stat and Melee skill; Ranged - Perception stat and Ranged skill). Melee weapons often have multiple different attacks, which can do variant damage based on a character's angle of attack, and whether or not the target is human or undead. Ranged weapons often lack the multiple different attacks of melee, but some can get modifications that improve their utility in combat.

A key factor within the combat in Dead State is the Noise Meter, which sits on the upper left of the screen and measures how much of a racket is being made. Undead and humans alike are attracted to noise, and raising the Noise Meter too high will result in undead spawning on the edges of the map, and moving towards the source of the sound. Players eventually discover items to allow them to manipulate noise, such as firecrackers and noisemakers, and can utilize them to lure enemies towards one another or away from a lootable area.

=== Reanimated changes ===
Released on May 13, 2015, the free Reanimated update included a significant amount of updates and improvements, including a full combat rebalance, improved animations, better AI, new areas, new gameplay modes, and stability and pathfinding improvements. The free demo of the game was later updated with the Reanimated content as well.

== Plot ==
Dead State is centered in the fictional town of Splendid, and the gameplay area covers a significant amount of the center of the state - this ranges from Abilene (north), San Angelo (west), and Austin (southeast). The game begins sometime in the modern day, in the spring, and lasts over a period of about four months.

Set at the beginning of the undead apocalypse, the player is involved in a plane crash over central Texas near the fictional town of Splendid, and are saved by a small group of survivors that have taken refuge at the local public school and made it their Shelter. As society is beginning to fall apart, the player must organize a handful of allies, work on fortifying the school into a livable long-term shelter, scouting for food and supplies, making uncertain alliances with others, and attempting to hold together a group as humanity teeters on the brink of extinction. And although the undead lurk as an ever present environmental threat, the biggest obstacle to the player are other humans with the same goal: survival at any cost.

== Development ==
Dead State began development in Summer 2009 as a collaboration between the newly formed DoubleBear Productions and Iron Tower Studio, with writer/designer Brian Mitsoda as the project lead. The game utilized The Age of Decadence's game engine, although it was later upgraded to Torque 3D. The game initially carried the working title of "ZRPG", but was updated with the formal title of Dead State when it was formally announced a year later.

Designer Brian Mitsoda stated that the game was intended to be very dynamic, with each playthrough forming a unique experience. Mitsoda's own experiences living in Miami, Florida during Hurricane Andrew were an influence on the game design, as he intended to "work it into a broader examination of how humans deal with a crisis beyond their control."

On June 5, 2012, DoubleBear started a campaign on the crowdfunding site, Kickstarter, seeking $150,000 to fund the development of the game. The campaign ended one month later on July 5, having collected $332,635; 221% of the original goal. The game was first shown at the Indie Megabooth for PAX Prime 2013 with a playable demo showing, and showed there again the following year. On February 14, 2014, DoubleBear Productions launched an early access demo of Dead State on Steam. Dead State: The First Seven Days was an early preview of the first week of Dead State’s gameplay as an opportunity for the player to prepare their strategy and allow the early access players to test and polish the game. Dead State entered active beta on Steam on August 27, 2014, and has had consistent patches and updates since the Early Access release in February.

Dead State was released on Steam and GOG.com on December 4, 2014, and was picked as PC Gamer writer Evan Lahti's 2014 Personal Pick. The game has had multiple updates since its release, the largest of those being the Reanimated release. As with that and all other patches and updates, they have been released for free to the owners of the game.

Although the Reanimated patch was the final update for Dead State, Iron Tower Studios assisted with creating a Russian language translation of the game. Brian Mitsoda also penned a postmortem of the game on Gamasutra, and the team spoke about it on a panel at PAX Dev 2015.
