= Din's Curse =

2010 video game

- Developer: Soldak Entertainment
- Publishers: Soldak Entertainment; Masque Publishing (retail)
- Designer: Steven Peeler
- Platforms: Microsoft Windows, Mac OS X, Linux
- Release: NA: March 31, 2010
- Genre: Action role-playing (hack and slash)
- Modes: Single-player, multiplayer

Din's Curse is an action role-playing game developed by Soldak Entertainment. It was officially released March 31, 2010, for the Windows and Mac OS X platforms. The retail game was published October 3, 2010, by Masque Publishing. This game evolved from the Depths of Peril game engine and story universe. On August 22, 2012, the game released to Steam for the Windows and Mac OS X, and Linux on April 23, 2014.

== Gameplay ==
Din's Curse is a singleplayer and co-op multiplayer action RPG. It is a game in the mold of Diablo with a point-and-click hack-and-slash style. It contains additional dynamic elements and events, 141 possible class combinations, an infinite number of programmatically generated towns, plot consequences in the game that are directly dependent on the player's actions, and a dynamic game world.

In the game, the player is required to explore randomly generated undergrounds of varying sizes and layouts, killing monsters and solving quests, while improving the character by gaining experience points and acquiring better equipment. The game world keeps on changing in the background, both according to and independently of the player's actions, resulting in events such as monster uprisings in the dungeons, sudden plagues, or invasions of the town.

Players have an option to set the difficulty of the game worlds that get created. Options include slowing or quickening the pace by which events unfold, adjusting the starting level of the monsters, and playing at various modes of difficulty from Easy (low experience gain) to Hardcore (character's death is permanent).

Difficulty options also exist for individual characters. These options modify the amount of gold the player finds, the stats they start with, and the failure conditions of that character.

=== Singleplayer ===
The game world (the town and dungeons in which the events are occurring) is randomly generated before each new world level begins. Once inside the world, the player must enter the dungeons below the town, kill monsters and solve quests before the monsters begin to gather their forces to attack the town.

If the player fails to accomplish quests on time, a few things can happen: Someone else (a game engine generated NPC) could attempt and succeed, or attempt and fail (in which case a rescue quest might be spawned), or the monsters could advance their goals towards destroying the town. The game's numerous quests are supplemented by the need to ward off the occasional foray into town by monster raiding parties or assassins.

When too many things go wrong, a tide of monsters will surge into town. Once too many of the townsfolk get slaughtered, the player fails the overall quest of saving the town. If the player is able to keep things under control and with enough key quests solved, the town gets saved and the player gets rewarded with loot and the option of continuing onto the next town (the next world level), a step in the direction towards gaining Din's favor and winning redemption (i.e. winning the game).

=== Multiplayer ===
The multiplayer feature allows players to play cooperatively on the same server, hosted by one of the players. What is unique to about this feature is that there is no limit to the number of multiplayer connections that can be made; that is, any number of people can play cooperatively.

To connect to a server, one can create a server on a LAN, or the Internet. Like in the singleplayer game, the game world is generated randomly and events unfold as time passes, except players can help each other accomplish the tasks at hand.

== Plot ==
Players take on the role of an anti-hero, seeking redemption. Din, champion of the gods, has cursed the player's character into a second life of service after selfishly squandering their first life causing misfortune to everyone else. To gain redemption, they must impress Din by building a reputation for helping others. The character must travel in the world of Aleria from town to desperate town to save them from the brink of annihilation by monsters welling up from the deep. Until then, the character is doomed to wander alone for all eternity.

== Modding ==
Along with the game, Soldak Entertainment has also released a modding SDK for Din's Curse. The mod allows players to directly impact the way the game is played, from basic things such as raising or lowering the game difficulty to changing game dynamics (e.g. lowering or increasing damage done/taken, removing spiders from the game for those with arachnophobia).

== Reception ==
Din's Curse has generated overall favorable reviews (Bytten: 94%; Co-Optimus: 4/5; GameZone: 8.0; AusGamers: 7.7; Gamersmint: 3.5/5) amongst online gaming sites. Following the successes of its predecessors from Soldak Entertainment, Kivi's Underworld and Depths of Peril, reviewers appear to see Din's Curse as a suitable and much more dynamic successor. One reviewer from fidgit.com describes the game aptly with his article titled Din's Curse is like Diablo, but with dungeons that fight back.
