= Annie VanderMeer =

American video game designer

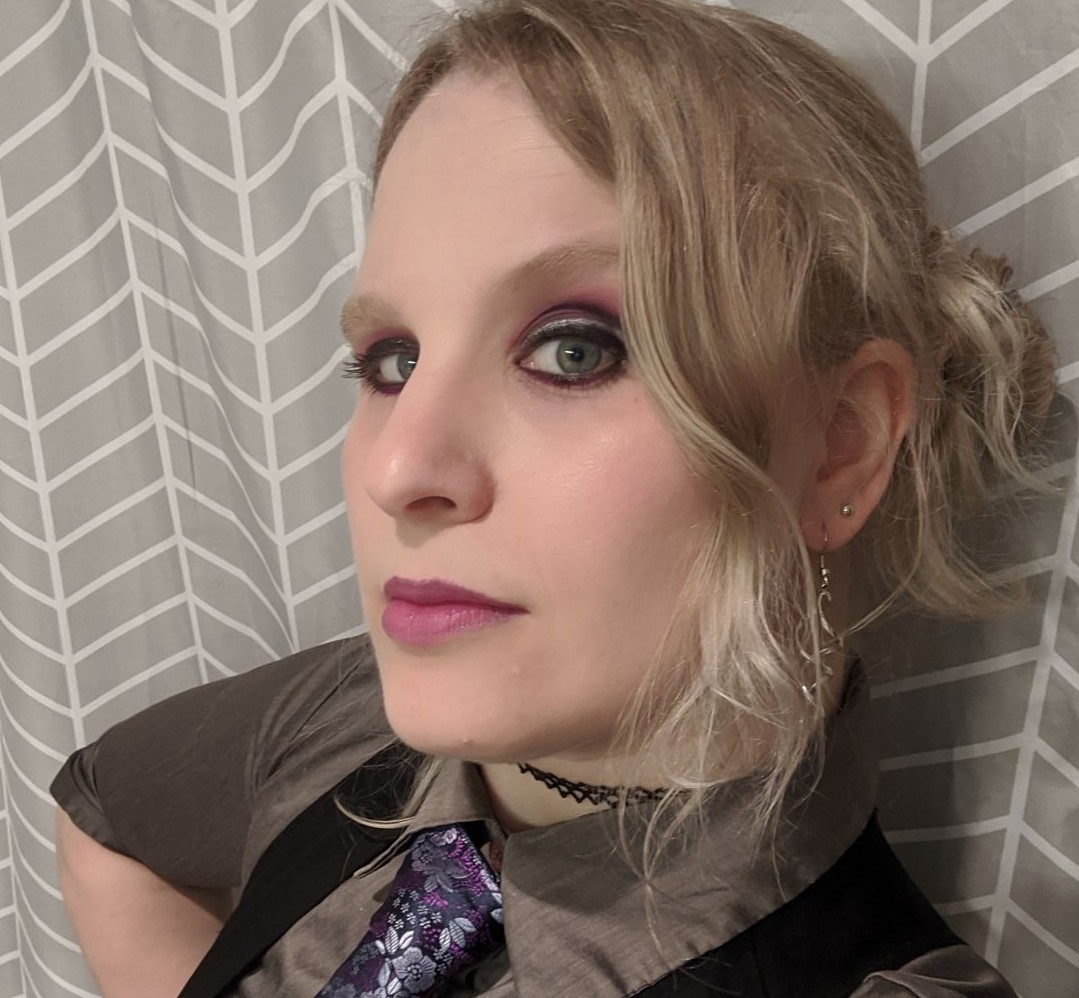
- Image from LudoNarraCon 2021 press banner
- Born: Annie VanderMeer; United States
- Other names: Annie Carlson, Annie VanderMeer Carlson, Anne VanderMeer, Annie VanderMeer Mitsoda
- Occupations: Game designer, writer
- Known for: Neverwinter Nights 2: Storm of Zehir; Guild Wars 2 Destiny; Dead State; Astroneer; Unpacking
- Website: https://www.annievandermeer.com/

Annie VanderMeer (also credited as Annie VanderMeer Mitsoda, Annie Carlson, Annie VanderMeer Carlson, and Anne VanderMeer) is an American video game designer specializing in role-playing video games, best known for her narrative work on 2021's Unpacking and her design work on the 2012's Guild Wars 2.

== Early life and education ==
Annie VanderMeer attended Macalester College and earned an Honors B.A. in English in 2003, writing about science fiction and fantasy in contemporary American literature.

== Career ==
After the discovery that there were limited opportunities to study and teach English/gaming in graduate school, VanderMeer (then Annie Carlson) started work at Papaya Studio in the summer of 2004, where she worked on Taxi Driver, a video game "sequel" to the film of the same name.

Soon after Taxi Driver was cancelled, VanderMeer joined Obsidian Entertainment in January 2006, beginning work on "Project New Jersey" (a rumored unreleased role-playing video game). When it was cancelled, VanderMeer joined the Neverwinter Nights 2 team, where she worked on handling the in-game items, then as a writing assistant on Alpha Protocol, working with creative lead Brian Mitsoda, where she was credited with helping create some of the characters. While working on Alpha Protocol, VanderMeer assisted with additional design for the first expansion to Neverwinter Nights 2, Mask of the Betrayer. In early 2008, she was moved onto the second expansion for Neverwinter Nights 2, Storm of Zehir as a designer and lead writer. She also assisted with work on the cancelled Aliens RPG before she left the company in October 2008 to move to Seattle.

In 2009, VanderMeer joined ArenaNet as a game designer, first working on the personal story for Guild Wars 2 before moving on to the Living Story team, working in particular on the updates "Lost Shores" and "Flame & Frost". From 2013 to 2014, VanderMeer worked as a game designer at Bungie on Destiny before becoming a full time member of DoubleBear Productions, from April 2014 to January 2018, where she worked as a writer and designer on their first title, Dead State, and as the project lead on their second, PANIC at Multiverse High!. In January 2018 she joined at System Era Softworks as a content designer on Astroneer, shipping the game and multiple updates before her departure in October 2019.

In September 2019, she founded the Tiamat Collective - a collection of freelancers across multiple disciplines available for hire on upcoming creative projects - and released their first game, The Passenger, in January 2020 on itch.io. She also contributed narrative design to the indie game Unpacking (videogame), for which she would go on to win Best Narrative (along with Wren Brier and Tim Dawson) at the BAFTA Games Awards in April 2022. Shortly thereafter, in December 2019, VanderMeer rejoined ArenaNet as a senior game designer for Guild Wars 2, first on their Living World Season "The Icebrood Saga," and later on their third expansion, End of Dragons. She left ArenaNet in April 2022 and went on to freelance work, becoming a Narrative Lead at Digimancy Entertainment in August 2022.

VanderMeer has contributed as a fiction writer to multiple projects at Fantasy Flight Games, including Legend of the Five Rings, The Investigators of Arkham Horror (a fiction collection based on their Arkham Horror franchise), the Twilight Imperium, and Legacy of Dragonholt, a narrative adventure game set in the Runebound universe.

== Panels and interviews ==
- Penny Arcade Expo 2006 - "'Neverwinter Nights 2'"
- Penny Arcade Expo 2008 - 'Women in the Game Industry'
- Penny Arcade Expo 2011 - "The Agony and Ecstasy of RPG Writing"
- Penny Arcade Expo Prime 2013 - "From Tabletop to Digital: Crafting Stronger Interactive Narratives"
- Penny Arcade Expo Prime 2014 - "Be So Good They Can't Ignore You: Tales of Successful Indies"
- Penny Arcade Expo Prime 2015 - "CLASSIC RPGs FOREVER!" * PAX Prime 2015 - "Surviving Success: How to Handle a Winning Kickstarter"
- Penny Arcade Expo Prime 2016 - "Choose Your Own Adventure: Women in Video Game Writing"
- Penny Arcade Expo Prime 2017 - "Real Feels: Crafting Meaningful Relationships in Games"
- Penny Arcade Expo Prime 2017 - "That's It, That's the Joke: Humor, Games, and Humorous Games."
- Penny Arcade Expo West 2018 - "I See What You Did There: Environmental Storytelling GO!"
- Matt Chat - interviews
- Seattle IGDA - "BECOMING: Game Leadership"
- LudoNarraCon 2021 - "Good Stories Must End"
- LudoNarraCon 2022 - "Trials of Gameplay Design"
