= Alpha Protocol =

2010 action role-playing game

- Developer: Obsidian Entertainment
- Publisher: Sega
- Director: Chris Parker
- Producer: Ryan Rucinski
- Designers: Chris Avellone; Raymond Holmes
- Programmers: Jay Fong; Dan Spitzley
- Artist: Aaron Meyers
- Writers: Chris Avellone; Travis Stout; Matt MacLean; Brian Mitsoda
- Composers: Jason Graves; Rod Abernethy
- Engine: Unreal Engine 3
- Platforms: PlayStation 3; Windows; Xbox 360
- Release: AU: May 27, 2010; EU: May 28, 2010; NA: June 1, 2010
- Genre: Action role-playing
- Mode: Single-player

Alpha Protocol is a 2010 action role-playing game developed by Obsidian Entertainment and published by Sega. The player assumes control of agent Michael Thorton, a new recruit at a clandestine United States agency called Alpha Protocol, which is given unlimited resources to conduct covert operations on behalf of the government. Thorton becomes a rogue agent and must unravel an international conspiracy to stop a war. Throughout the game, players must make many choices that affect the narrative. Played from a third-person perspective, players can confront enemies using firearms, gadgets, martial arts and stealth. The game features extensive customization and a dialogue stance system that allows players to select dialogues based on three different tones.

The game's development began in March 2006 after publisher Sega approached Obsidian for a new intellectual property role-playing game. While Obsidian co-founders Feargus Urquhart and Chris Jones came up with the concept of an "espionage RPG", no one was assigned to lead the project until early 2008. The project was mostly inspired by iconic spy characters such as Jason Bourne, James Bond and Jack Bauer, and by films including Syriana, Ronin and The Good, the Bad and the Ugly. Sega also participated in the game's development, supporting the plot rewrite by Chris Avellone, and sending quality assurance and cohesion strike teams to ensure there were no plot holes.

Alpha Protocol was released for PlayStation 3, Windows, and Xbox 360 in May 2010. The game received polarized reviews upon release. Critics praised the game's setting, customization and reactivity, but criticized its gameplay, story, graphics and presentation; it was generally considered to be ambitious but executed many concepts poorly. Retrospectively, the game's reputation improved and it gained a cult following. Despite Obsidian's desire to develop a sequel, intellectual property owner Sega was not satisfied with the game's financial performance and no sequel is planned. All sales of Alpha Protocol were halted in June 2019 due to expired music licenses. Sales resumed in 2024.

== Gameplay ==
In this gameplay screenshot, Michael Thorton is hiding behind a cover in the midst of a boss fight.

Alpha Protocol is an action role-playing game played from a third-person perspective. Players assume control of Michael Thorton, a secret agent who must travel around the world as he unravels a conspiracy that threatens his safety. At the start of the game, players can choose Thorton's agent history; options include Soldiers—which focuses on using heavy firearms, Tech Specialists—which have an arsenal of gadgets to use, and Field Agents—which encourages the use of stealth. There are also Freelancer, Recruit, and Veteran options, in which players custom-build their own class. Players can customize elements of Thorton's appearance, including his hair, eye color, costumes, and accessories including hats and glasses.

Missions typically start at a safe house, which serves as a hub for players. In the hub, players can select missions, access the black market to buy weapons and intelligence, and use the weapon locker. Weapons can be extensively customized; options include the addition of a scope to improve shooting accuracy and the use of phosphorus ammunition to burn enemies. In missions, players can approach their objectives in a variety of ways; they can directly confront enemies using the four weapon classes—submachine guns, pistols, assault rifles, and shotguns—and use gadgets such as grenades, flashbangs, and detonated mines. Players can buy armor that boosts Thorton's endurance during missions. Non-lethal means can also be used; Thorton can use martial arts or tranquilizing guns to knock out enemies, and stealth to evade enemies and security measures such as cameras. Levels are intricate, with multiple paths for players to use and explore. Players can collect money bags and open safes in mission areas, and use the money to buy weapons, gadgetry, and intelligence after returning to the hub. Players can hide behind a cover to evade enemy fire and prevent themselves being noticed. To open locked doors and encrypted computers, and disable alarms, players must hack them by completing mini-games. A mission summary screen, which lists the number of completed objectives and individual players killed or knocked out, appears after the completion of missions.

By choosing the correct dialogue options and completing certain gameplay challenges, players can earn small combat enhancements called Perks. Thorton's skills can be extensively customized. Players earn experience points while completing certain actions. Skills points are earned when players level-up after earning sufficient experience points, which can be used to upgrade nine aspects of Thorton's skills; namely Stealth, Pistols, Submachine Guns, Shotguns, Assault Rifles, Sabotage, Technical Aptitude, Toughness and Martial Arts. Spending points on these aspects unlock new skills that can be activated to enhance Thorton's combat efficiency. For instance, a skill known as Chain Shot slows the passage of time and allows players to kill enemies in rapid succession. Players can specialize in three skills, which further raises the level cap.

At the heart of Alpha Protocol is the dialogue system. This screen shows a typical dialogue sequence players use to decide their progress.

Alpha Protocol features numerous non-playable characters (NPC) with whom to interact. Conversations occur in real-time, giving the player a limited amount of time to respond to key decision points. The dialogue system in the game, known as the Dialogue Stance System (DSS), allows the player to choose one of three attitudes, or "stances", when speaking to an NPC. In dialogue sequences, the player can choose from three main options; "professional", "suave", and "aggressive". Sometimes, a fourth, "special" dialogue choice is also available. Dossiers enable players to gain early understanding of NPCs before approaching them; new dialogue options may appear if the dossiers are nearly completed after players collect sufficient intelligence. Each NPC will react differently to these choices; they change their perception of Thorton, affecting his reputation. It will also change NPCs' actions during the game, benefiting or undermining Thorton's operation. While dialogue choices will have some immediately noticeable consequences, many may not become apparent until much later in the game. Players can also make numerous important decisions that affects the game's story, including the fate of some in-game characters. These decisions change the state of the game's world and lead to 32 possible endings.

== Synopsis ==
=== Characters ===
The main and playable character of Alpha Protocol is Michael Thorton (Josh Gilman), a highly skilled secret agent newly recruited into a clandestine United States agency called Alpha Protocol, which has unlimited resources to conduct covert operations on behalf of the government. Thorton's colleagues are his handler Mina Tang (Adrienne Wilkinson), superior Yancy Westridge (Gary Anthony Williams), and veteran Alpha Protocol advisors Alan Parker (Michael Bell) and Sean Darcy (Andre Sogliuzzo).

=== Plot ===
Alpha Protocol is a highly classified black ops agency whose existence remains unknown to many—even those in the highest echelons of the United States government—as a means to operate outside of the confines of government oversight. Recent inductee Agent Michael Thorton is given his first assignment; the assassination of Sheikh Ali Shaheed, the leader of the Saudi Arabia-based terrorist group Al-Samad, which used American-made missiles to shoot down a civilian airliner. When confronted, Shaheed claims Halbech, an American defense contractor, provided him with the weapons and target. Thorton neutralizes Shaheed and recovers his intel, but his position is struck by missiles and Thorton is presumed dead. Thorton survives with the aid of his handler Mina Tang, who warns him of the attack and that the agency has been infiltrated by Halbech operatives.

Shaheed's intel reveals three key locations tied to the conspiracy; Rome, where an Al-Samad cell has been activated; Moscow, through which the missiles were routed; and Taipei, where Taiwanese President Ronald Sung is under threat of assassination. The locations can be visited in any order and events that take place may influence interactions that occur in other locations. Thorton deduces that Halbech's plan is to raise global tensions and cause a new cold war, turning the world into its private marketplace.

In Rome, Thorton meets Madison Saint James, with whose help he discovers the private security firm Veteran Combat Initiative (VCI), which is run by Halbech's former security chief Conrad Marburg, who is planning a false flag operation to blow up a museum to influence harsher anti-terrorism legislation in Europe using Al-Samad as a scapegoat. Marburg kidnaps Madison; Thorton must choose between saving her or preventing the museum's destruction and innocent deaths. Afterward, Marburg escapes unless Thorton can persuade him to finish their fight to the death. If Thorton chooses to save Madison over the civilians, she leaves out of guilt.

In Moscow, Thorton tracks weapon shipments to Konstantin Brayko, a Russian Mafia underboss with apparent ties to Halbech. During his investigation, Thorton can encounter German VCI-affiliate mercenary SIE, and Sis, a mute in-service to Albatross, the leader of the G22 paramilitary group. Thorton, aided by either G22 or the VCI, infiltrates the American embassy to contact Russian Mafia boss Sergei Surkov. After discussing the arms deal with Surkov, Thorton confronts Brayko in his mansion. After defeating Brayko, Thorton can learn that Surkov worked with Halbech and framed Brayko. If he learns the truth, Thorton confronts Surkov, whom he can either work with, arrest or kill.

In Taipei, Thorton uncovers a plot by Omen Deng of the secret police to assassinate Ronald Sung and incite riots at a political rally to provoke a conflict with the United States. With aid from Triad leader Hong Shi, and/or G22, and Steven Heck—a psychotic man claiming to work for the CIA—Thorton counters an assassination attempt by Deng and obtains a disk containing the plot. When the disk is analyzed, a security protocol starts to erase data, forcing the player to choose to save files detailing either the assassination or the riot instigation. Eventually, Deng and Thorton duel on a building overlooking the podium, after which Thorton can either kill or spare Deng. If Deng is spared, it is revealed that both he and Thorton were tricked into thinking the other was the assassin, allowing the real assassin to shoot Sung. If the assassination data is saved, Thorton persuades Sung to wear body armor and survive, but hundreds are killed in the riots.

Along the way, Thorton encounters Scarlet Lake, a photojournalist with many contacts. After completing the three operations and optionally contacting some affiliates, Thorton — attempting to expose Halbech's activities before World War III starts — surrenders to Alpha Protocol and is brought to Henry Leland, CEO of Halbech and acting commander of Alpha Protocol. Leland and Thorton discuss his activities; if the player has a high reputation, Leland subsequently attempts to recruit Thorton. If Thorton refuses, he escapes the Alpha Protocol holding facility and with the aid of his prior contacts — if any — fights or sneaks through the Alpha Protocol facility. After confronting Leland himself, Thorton may either execute or capture him, but Leland is killed if caught.

If Thorton agrees to work with Leland, or if he spared Shaheed and obtained the information against Alpha Protocol from him in the endgame, he also escapes the Alpha Protocol facility and eventually confronts his former superior Yancy Westridge. Shortly after executing or sparing Westridge, Thorton can choose to partner with Leland or betray him. If the player confronted Westridge using Shaheed's information instead, Thorton will have the option of executing or sparing Leland as well. Additionally, Thorton can learn that the real assassin in Taipei was Scarlet Lake, who is in Leland's employ, and he may choose to either execute her for justice, let her go, or invite her to team up with him.

Escaping into a bay on a motor yacht (potentially with a number of allies), Thorton considers his next move and wonders whether his life will continue to be exciting.

== Development ==
The development of Alpha Protocol began around March 2006. In late 2005, developer Obsidian Entertainment was finishing work on their video game Neverwinter Nights 2, during which the studio received a call from publisher Sega about making a new role-playing game for them. Around this time, Obsidian was busy with other projects and had no employees to spare for another game. Obsidian agreed with Sega's request for them to originate a new concept and to begin work on it when possible. Obsidian co-founders Feargus Urquhart and Chris Jones originated the concept of a "spy RPG"; Sega was pleased with the idea and its originality. After the cancellation of Dwarfs, Obsidian's role-playing game prequel to Snow White and the Seven Dwarves it was developing for Disney, the staff from that game began work on Alpha Protocol. While layoffs at Obsidian were avoided, the cancellation of Dwarfs forced the studio to give Sega the intellectual property rights to Alpha Protocol. As the game's development progressed, the team's size grew from two people to over sixty.

During the early stages of its development, no personnel were assigned to lead roles on Alpha Protocol. The development team did not have much direction for the game, and they did not know its target audience. Neither did they prepare any documents laying out guidelines for the game's design and development. The team also struggled with designing stealth for the game due to their lack of experience and technical difficulties caused by the Unreal Engine 3. At that time, Obsidian was working on another project for Sega named Aliens: Crucible, which Sega later canceled. The Alpha Protocol team realized the game's slow progress and development could not continue. Around two years into development, Obsidian's co-owner Chris Parker became the game's project director, and the studio's creative director Chris Avellone volunteered to become its lead designer.

Avellone and Parker organized a meeting to set a firm direction for the game and settled on its features. They decided not to include parkour, chase scenes with a motorcycle and yacht, and environmental interaction. A female character known as Uli Booi was scrapped after the meeting. The game structure was modified and safe houses were introduced to make the game less linear. The mini-games were also changed significantly; the team initially wanted to remove them completely but Sega objected and the team modified them and made them faster. With all these changes, both Sega's confidence in the game and the team's morale were restored. While the team had settled on the game's design, more features were cut or downgraded due to time constraints. The artificial intelligence originally designed for the game drained the game's technical performance and they made it less complex so the game could run better. A planned female version of Micheal Thorton was canceled in order to save money; the team would have needed to change dialogue and create new animations for the character. The mission debrief showing up after the player completed a mission was initially a bug discovered by one of the game's testers; the team redeveloped this to become an official feature. Obsidian also added and refined most of the role-playing elements in early-to-mid-2009 at Sega's request.

The development team were inspired by pop culture spy icons such as Jack Bauer and James Bond; the game was a "Jason Bourne adventure" with some over-the top-characters similar to those in Kill Bill. They also took inspiration from other games, including Deus Ex, System Shock 2 and Fallout, TV series like Burn Notice, as well as films such as Syriana, Ronin, and The Good, The Bad, and The Ugly.

The game is a spy-adventure; player's in-game choices affect the world's state. The morality in the game was designed to be ambiguous, reflecting its real-world setting. Players can choose to spare or kill all the enemies without knowing who their allies and enemies truly are. Thorton's responses to other non-playable characters also have consequences and affect their perception of Thorton. The team ensured that no matter which moral paths players take, they will be rewarded; the team did not want to punish players for playing the game in a certain way. Michael Thorton was designed to be an everyman, allowing players to choose their playstyle freely without having to conform to a particular style of play. To complement the spy theme of the game, the team added a timer to the dialogue system to further immerse players into the game and make intrinsic decisions. The dialogue stance system meant voice actors had to record the same lines using several different tones. The game's location was set across the globe; the team wanted players to feel Thorton is an "international superspy".

Brian Mitsoda drafted the initial story for Alpha Protocol; he decided which locations would appear in the game and with Annie Carlson created all of the characters, while artist Brian Menze handled the characters' visual designs. The narrative in the released game was primarily written by Avellone, who took over the main creative role two years after development began. This resulted in a substantial rewriting and repurposing of the plot; player choice was given more importance, intertwining of gameplay and reactivity became a forefront design philosophy, and the core and motivations of several narrative threads were changed. The new narrative team, which consisted of Avellone, Travis Stout, and Matt MacLean, wrote new dialogue for the characters created by Mitsoda and Carlson, and they also wrote a new story and script using the locations decided upon by Mitsoda. Each writer was given a set amount of work; MacLean wrote most of the in-game emails and Stout was the lead writer for the Taipei hub, writing for characters including Steven Heck, Omen Deng, and Hong Shi. Stout also wrote several secondary characters in the Rome hub, while Avellone designed most of the other characters.

Sega was supportive of the team's rewriting of the plot, sending quality assurance and cohesion strike teams to avoid problems with the in-game reactivity or plot holes; Sega, however, had little involvement with the narrative aspects and mainly focused on the game and combat design. Urquhart said the game's development problems were partly due to Sega's indecision, particularly in budgeting; one long segment of the game cost around US$500,000 to produce, which was eventually cut because Sega thought it was not a good fit for the game.

The game was officially announced by Sega and Obsidian Entertainment in March 2008. Alpha Protocol was originally due to be released in October 2009, but Sega later announced its release would be delayed until early 2010 after the game missed its projected release date. Producer Matt Hickman said the publisher delayed the game so the team could further polish it, introducing improvements to the lighting system. He later stated the delay was intended to reposition the game in a less crowded release window to avoid competition with other blockbuster titles. The game was officially released in Australia on May 27, 2010; in Europe on May 28; and in North America on June 1. Players who preordered the game via GameStop and Best Buy received the "Exclusive Assault Pack" and the "Stealth Weapons Pack", respectively. Both packs give players additional weapons to use in the game.

In June 2019, Sega halted the sale of Alpha Protocol across all digital outlets, including Steam and the Humble Store, due to the licenses of several music tracks used in the game having expired. In March 2024, GOG.com announced the return of Alpha Protocol digitally via their store. The game was relisted on Steam later in June.

== Reception ==
=== Critical reception ===
Reception

Aggregate score
Aggregator	Score
Metacritic	(PC) 72/100 (PS3) 64/100 (X360) 63/100

Review scores
Publication	Score
Destructoid	2/10
Eurogamer	7/10
Game Informer	6.5/10
GameRevolution	3/5
GameSpot	6/10
IGN	6.3/10
Joystiq	2/5
PC Gamer (UK)	81/100

Alpha Protocol received divided reviews from critics; while Obsidian expected the game to score around 80 marks out of 100, review aggregator Metacritic recorded lower average scores.

The gameplay received negative reviews. The gunplay was criticized for lacking polish and being unrefined, and the artificial intelligence was found to be subpar by most critics. Rich McCormick from PC Gamer called the combat "simplistic" and the gunplay "floaty", but he was impressed by the weapon customization system's complexity and extensiveness. Charles Onyett from IGN had a less-enthusiastic view of the customization system and considered it only serviceable. He also criticized other gameplay faults, such as the unreliable cover system, repetitive combat encounters, and sub-par boss fights. Christian Donlan enjoyed the boss fights for their changing of the game's pace. Kevin VanOrd from GameSpot criticized the game's camera for being unreliable and the cover for being inconsistent. He also noted that poor AI hindered the stealth sections and that combat scenarios may not match the players' customization, leading to players' frustration. Nicholas Tan of GameRevolution noted issues with the clumsiness of using special abilities, and poor gunplay, especially in the earlier levels of the game. He enjoyed the mini-games, which he described as "challenging". However, Onyett and VanOrd noted these mini-games were not designed for PC players. Justin McElroy from Joystiq criticized the gunplay, in which weapon accuracy is based on its statistics instead of aiming. James Stephanie Sterling from Destructoid and Joe Juba from Game Informer were very critical of the gameplay systems, which Sterling called "abominable" and "ruined"; and Juba said many of the game's systems are "archaic and unaccommodating".

The game's role-playing nature received critical acclaim. Both McCarmick and Tan liked the Dialogue Stance System's timer; they said it provides a tense experience for the players because it forces them to choose quickly. McCormick said the description for the dialogue choices is not sufficient. He liked the game's respect of players' choices and their effect on certain dialogue outcomes, concluding that these choices make the story more personal for the player. Tan praised the game's script and voice-acting, which he said was well-written and excellent. Onyett said the game was unsure of its direction, calling the game boring when it tries to be serious and childish when it tries to be humorous. He praised the game's sense of progression, noting players' freedom when interacting with in-game characters, though he was disappointed some characters were not fleshed out enough and most are "flat stereotypes". VanOrd also appreciated the game for respecting players' choices and their consequences on the game's world, and the plot's flexible nature. However, he was disappointed by the narrative, criticizing it for lacking "soul and character". Similarly, McElroy said the choice system was dragged down by the game's boring and flat story. Juba was disappointed by the lead character Michael Thorton, who he felt lacks a personality, and that the dialogue stance system is only capable of providing clichéd choices.

The game's presentation received generally negative reviews. Its visuals were considered disappointing, with critics calling its graphics "bland", "artistically uninspired", and "dated". Tan noted the game's technical shortcomings, criticizing its textures and animation. Onyett shared similar concerns, calling the game's scenery and models unremarkable and dull. He also noted the number of glitches and frame rate issues in the game. VanOrd criticized the texture pop-ins and the long loading times for the textures to load. McElroy and Juba also said the game's loading time was very long. Sterling greatly disliked the game's graphics, saying it matches "the atrocious quality of the gameplay" and that it feels like a "bad budget game that isn't even worth $20".

Critics have mixed opinions on the game overall. McCormick said while the gameplay is subpar, Alpha Protocol is a captivating "spy simulation" that has a compelling and personal story. Tan called it a strange hybrid with disappointing and average gameplay, and provocative RPG systems, and described the game as a divisive title. Many critics said the game needs a sequel to improve its shortcomings. Onyett said it had the foundation to be entertaining but the numerous gameplay faults undermined its potential. VanOrd described the game as a "5,000-piece jigsaw puzzle with 500 pieces missing", and said that while it was ambitious, it was incomplete and the gameplay faults were too significant to be ignored. Sterling noted the game's ambition but said its execution problems and severe fundamental faults tarnish the experience. Donlan said the game can steadily win players over, despite the fact it will constantly frustrate them.

Since 2013, the game's reputation improved. Tony Deans from Hardcore Gamer said the choices featured in the game made the narrative engrossing and engaging, and that any small choice may have big consequences. He concluded by saying every RPG player should play the game. Richard Cobbett from Eurogamer called it the best spy game ever made, appreciating that the story and characters react to players' choices, and said that other games should learn from it. He concluded by expressing his desire for a sequel. Phil Savage called the game "a wonderful mess, full of great ideas, but hampered by the sort of behind-the-scenes development troubles". He criticized the opening Saudi Arabia level for being "monotonous", but stated later levels are more varied and interesting. He thought the game should be applauded for its modern setting that was rarely explored by other role-playing games, and added that there are many great game design and systems that can be expanded upon by Obsidian or other game development companies. Anthony Burch from Destructoid praised the game's sense of humor, ending variety, and the combat system, in which he stated its "brokenness" becomes fun. He concluded by calling it one of the best role-playing games ever, and compared it with Mass Effect. Rowan Kaiser of Engadget positively compared the game to Deus Ex, saying, "the strengths of both games point toward the future of video games".

=== Legacy ===
In the United Kingdom, the game was the thirteenth-best-selling entertainment-related retail software in its week of release. A month after release, the game had sold 700,000 copies in the US and Europe. The game's slow sales contributed to Sega's lower-than-expected financial results in the three months ending on June 30, 2011.

Sega was not satisfied with the game's commercial performance and announced there would not be a sequel to it. The game gained a cult following upon release, mainly due to its handling of players' choices. Obsidian Entertainment had publicly stated its desire to develop a sequel for Alpha Protocol, for which the development team had new ideas. Intellectual property owner Sega must approve any sequel, for which it has not announced any plans. The trademark was cancelled in 2021.
