= DoubleBear Productions =

Video game developer

- Founded: 2009
- Defunct: 3 November 2019
- Headquarters: Seattle, Washington, U.S.
- Key people: Brian Mitsoda; (creative director); Annie VanderMeer; (writer and designer)
- Website: www.doublebearproductions.com

DoubleBear Productions is an indie game studio founded in June 2009 by writer and game designer Brian Mitsoda.

== Founding ==
In both the Making of Dead State book and various interviews, Brian Mitsoda stated that his primary motive for founding DoubleBear was to make the games that he wanted to create, and not have to worry about the heartbreak of a publisher changing their mind and killing the project:

The thing you really take away from it is that unless you are in charge of the project 100%, it's completely out of your hands whether the project gets torpedoed.

== Games ==
=== Dead State ===
DoubleBear's first project was Dead State, a turn-based role-playing game set in a zombie apocalypse scenario. The studio worked with Iron Tower Studio on the project, and the game utilized The Age of Decadence's game engine. Information regarding the theme and setting was divulged in a Rock, Paper, Shotgun article, including a quote from Mitsoda that reveals that one of the goals of the game is a "serious examination of a national crisis or natural disaster," and that the game draws inspiration from Mitsoda's own experiences living in Miami, Florida, during Hurricane Andrew.

Dead State launched a successful Kickstarter campaign in summer 2012, released on Steam Early Access in February 2014, and had a final release on Steam and GOG.com on December 4, 2014. The game was supported with multiple free updates afterwards, culminating in the final Reanimated update, meant to act as a definitive edition of the game.

=== PANIC series ===
For a while after the release of Dead State: Reanimated, the team made various references to a second game on their Twitch streams, and mentioned that they had "pretty exciting (and very fun) projects in the works" in their Dead State postmortem on Gamasutra.

On August 16, 2016, a surprise announcement in a story from PC Gamer revealed that DoubleBear was about to release one game - PANIC at Multiverse High! - and was announcing another - PANIC in the Multiverse!

==== PANIC at Multiverse High! ====
PANIC at Multiverse High! is a parody visual novel/otome game in the vein of Hatoful Boyfriend: the main character wakes up unexpectedly with no memory of their past, nearly late for high school. Once there, they find that a cruel tentacled monster in a letterman jacket - Chad - has declared himself their rival, and they need to enhance their attributes (Cool, Nice, Tough) to make friends and defeat Chad at Prom.

According to the PC Gamer article, PANIC at Multiverse High! was initially conceived as an internal joke, but became a real title when the initial project changed direction. The game was meant to act as a fundraiser for PANIC in the Multiverse!, saying that "We decided to take this route instead of Kickstarter so that no matter what, people would have a game to play, and get to know the characters and setting more directly."

==== PANIC in the Multiverse! ====
PANIC in the Multiverse! is the follow-up title, and is described as being a Japanese role-playing game-style base-defense game, involving gathering a team of heroes to push forward to an enemy base and destroying it before the enemy could do the same to the player's. According to the website, the gameplay involves collecting heroes from all over the Multiverse in order to and bring the fight to the main enemy, "the self-proclaimed overlord of the Multiverse, King Sha'art."
