= Underrail =

2015 video game

- Developer: Stygian Software
- Publisher: Stygian Software
- Designer: Dejan Radisic
- Programmers: Dejan Radisic; Ivana Radisic
- Artists: Dejan Radisic; Mario Tovirac; Kira Mayer
- Writers: Dejan Radisic; Stefan Cupovic
- Composer: Josh Culler
- Platform: Windows
- Release: December 18, 2015
- Genre: Role-playing
- Mode: Single-player

Underrail is a 2015 role-playing video game by Stygian Software for Windows. It was first released in early access in late 2012. The game has two expansion packs, Underrail: Expedition (2019) and Underrail: Heavy Duty (2023). A sequel, Underrail 2: Infusion, is in development.

== Gameplay ==
Underrail is a post-apocalyptic role-playing game focused on combat and exploration. It features turn-based combat, character customization, and an item crafting system. The player controls a single character, whose development and interactions with the game world are the focus of the gameplay. The game's ruleset is mainly inspired by the SPECIAL system from the Fallout series. It is a classless system with multiple levels of customization. Base ability scores determine a character's core potential, skills represent a character's linear progression in specific skills and feats can grant new abilities, provide passive bonuses or alter a character's existing abilities. The turn-based combat system is similar to Fallout's with more options added on top of it, such as the use of special abilities, psionics and more combat utilities. The system is intended to provide many combat options and unique playstyles.

== Plot ==
=== Setting ===
The game is set in the far future when the Earth's surface has been uninhabitable for a long time and the remaining humans live in the eponymous Underrail metro network, where conflicting factions struggle violently to survive in the harsh underground conditions. The scarcest resources in Underrail are food and living space. There is also a greater background plot concerning the nature of time, but the game is mostly about the inhabitants of Underrail, their politics, strife and the dangers of Underrail itself.

=== Story ===
The player assumes the role of a new citizen of South Gate Station (SGS), one of the larger settlements in the South Underrail region. Early in the game, the protagonist is tasked by station councillor Hadrian Tanner with assisting in repair efforts following a massive earthquake that has disrupted train routes and isolated the station. These tasks culminate in a mission to Depot A, a hazardous, mutant-infested junkyard, to retrieve a circuit board needed to repair drilling equipment.

It is soon revealed that the earthquake was triggered by a large-scale incursion conducted by an enigmatic faction known as the Faceless, a technologically advanced group of cybernetically augmented beings who have begun tunneling through various parts of South Underrail. The reasons behind their invasion are initially unclear.

The exact progression of the plot from this point can vary dramatically depending on the player's choices, but matters always culminate in discovering the existence of an alien artifact referred to as "The Cube". The Faceless are revealed to be searching for this artifact, which is ultimately stolen from a hidden research facility by a pseudo-religious scientific order called the Institute of Tchort. The Tchortists worship an allegedly primordial entity known as Tchort, believed to dwell deep beneath the Underrail in a region known as the Deep Caverns.

In pursuit of the Cube, the player infiltrates the Institute of Tchort, either through deception or violence. The Faceless launch a direct assault on the Institute, creating an opportunity for the player to descend into the Deep Caverns via an internal elevator system. There, the protagonist encounters an enigmatic cyborg known as Six, who claims that the Cube is now in the possession of Tchort and must be retrieved. He tasks the player with killing Tchort and returning the artifact to the Faceless.

After gaining access to Tchort’s lair, the player defeats the entity and recovers the Cube. The player may choose to return the artifact to the Faceless, but if they do not, Six seizes it during the journey back to the surface. At this point, Six reveals that Hadrian Tanner is secretly a member of the same species as himself, and accuses Tanner of having committed an unspecified crime. He urges the player to travel to North Underrail to track Tanner with him, who has fled the region while the player was in Deep Caverns.

The game concludes with the player choosing either to pursue Tanner into North Underrail, or to remain and assume leadership of South Gate Station.

== Development ==
Game engine development for Underrail began in late 2008. The game's custom engine and development tools are built using C#, Microsoft's .NET 4.0 framework and XNA Game Studio 4.0. The game has been in full-time development since late 2009 and it was known as Timelapse Vertigo during its pre-alpha and earlier development stages. Prior to its early access release on Windows, most of the development work including design, programming, writing and graphics excluding character models and title screen, was done by Dejan Radisic. Since its initial demo version release in 2012, updated versions of Underrail were released roughly every three or four months.

The game was crowdfunded with early access sales providing additional funding. Character models and music of the game were created by freelance artists, while royalty-free sound effects were used. The first trailer for Underrail was released on March 11, 2013, showcasing alpha version gameplay footage. It entered early access in September 2013 and was officially released on December 21, 2015.

== Release ==
On August 22, 2012, a demo of Underrail was released on IndieDB. On December 6, 2012, an alpha version became available on both Desura and GamersGate digital distribution platforms, and on September 24, 2013, alpha version became available as early access on the Steam store as well.

The game was released out of early access on December 18, 2015. An expansion, Underrail: Expedition, was released on July 22, 2019, and features a new plotline based in new locations, alongside other gameplay changes and additions. A second expansion, Underrail: Heavy Duty, was released on November 1st 2023.

== Reception ==
Reception

Aggregate score
Aggregator	Score
Metacritic	72/100

Review score
Publication	Score
Destructoid	7.5/10

Underrail received mixed reviews according to review aggregator Metacritic.

== Sequel ==
A sequel, Underrail 2: Infusion, is in development.
