= Sintel The Game =

- Developers: Jonathan Buresh; Noah Summers; Malcolm Corliss; David Barker; David; James Raymond; Carlo
- Engine: Blender Game Engine 2.68
- Platforms: Microsoft Windows, Mac OS X, Linux, FreeBSD (any platform that can run Blender 2.68)
- Release: 2011
- Mode: Single-player

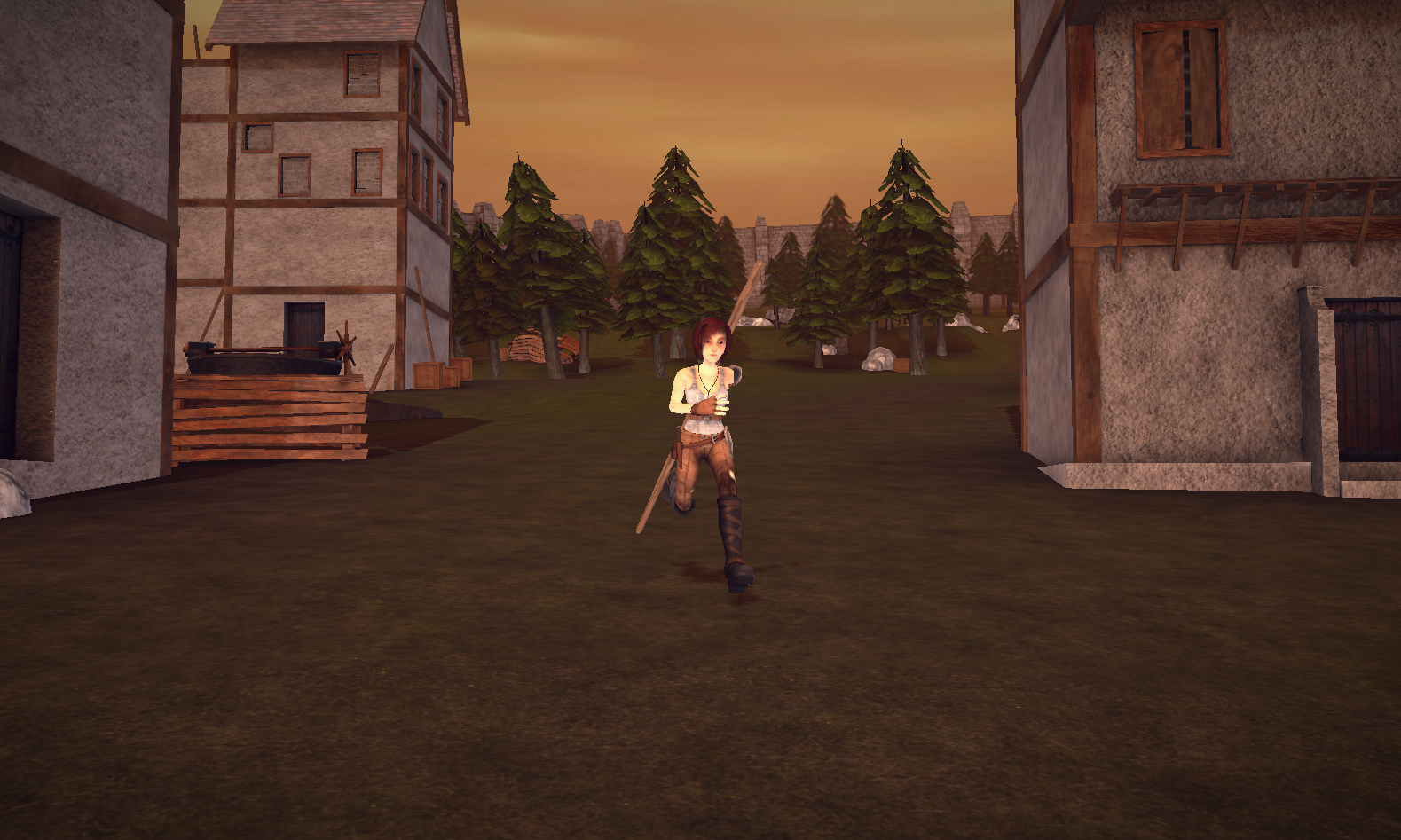
Docks level

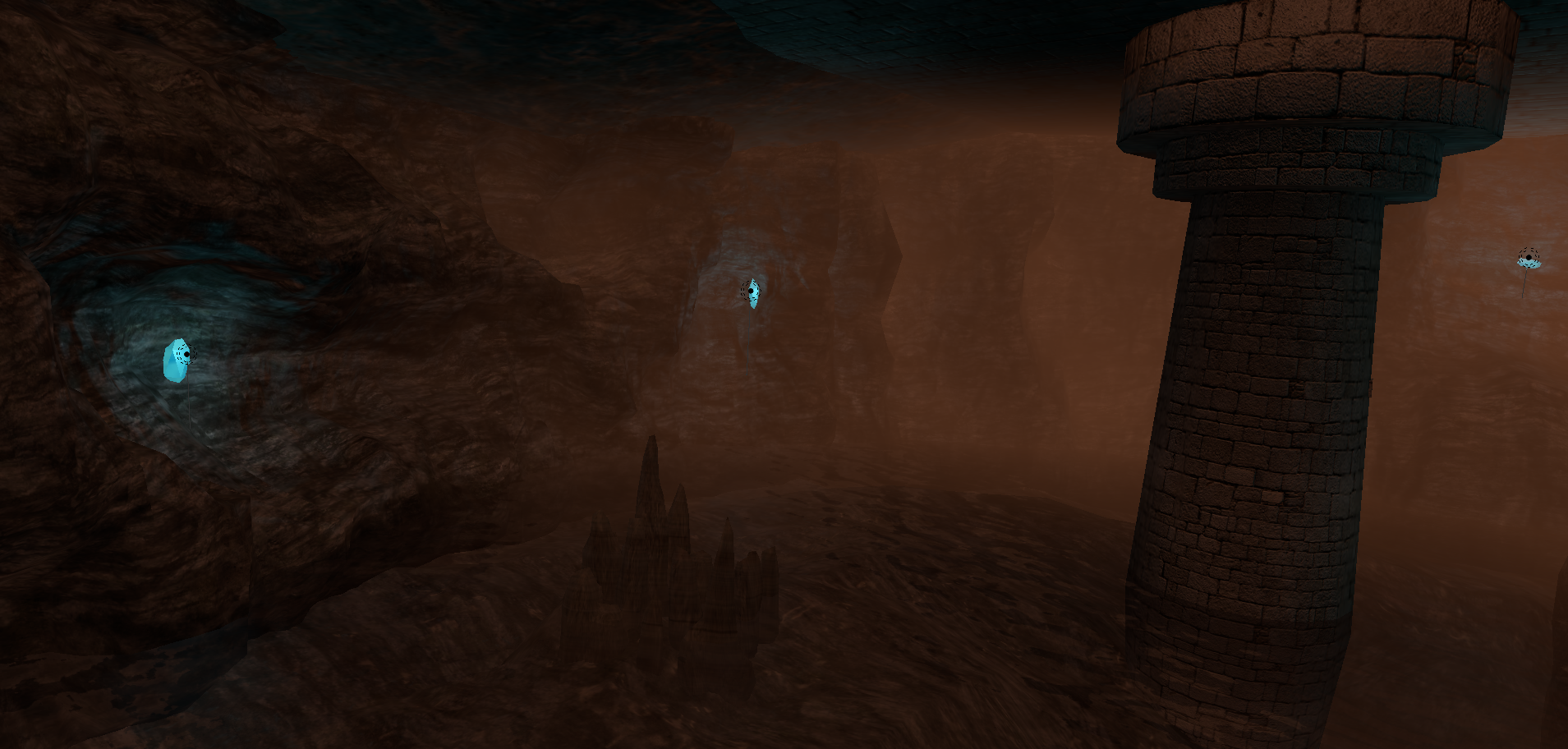
Cave Troll level

Sintel The Game is a video game based on the Blender Foundation film Sintel. Both the game and the film were developed using Blender.

== Plot ==
The game centers on a teenage girl named Sintel who is searching for a dragon she befriended in childhood. In this game, Sintel has come across Garway and its corrupt guards. She helps the residents rise up against these guards. The game includes her journeys through Garway.

== Development ==
A pre-demo version of Sintel The Game was shown off for the Blender Summer Game Contest in January 2011, and came in 2nd place.

The 0.1 Alpha version of Sintel The Game was published for download in July 2012, on the game's official website. The 0.2 Alpha version was published in September 2013, and remains the latest version released.

Sintel The Game accepts any compatible .blend file put into its "Levels" folder as a level. It will be accessible from the game and can be played. Anyone who has Blender may make a level.

Sintel The Game uses a large number of Python scripts to control AIs, run the Level Manager and save the character's position. A few of these scripts are based on some Python scripts coded for the Blender Foundation open game Yo Frankie!, but the majority is coded either as a Blender feature or by the Sintel The Game team.

Sintel The Game (including all images, models and logic) is under the MIT license.

== See also ==
- List of open source games
