= Depths of Peril =

2007 video game

- Developer: Soldak Entertainment
- Platforms: Windows, Mac OS X
- Release: September 5, 2007 (Windows); June 4, 2008 (Mac OS X)
- Genre: Action RPG
- Mode: Single-player

Depths of Peril is a fantasy, single-player action RPG computer game. It was developed by Soldak Entertainment and was released on September 5, 2007. Depths of Peril is set in the fictional lands of Aleria. In the game, the protagonist is a faction leader in the barbarian city of Jorvik. The player's main goal is to protect the city from the rampaging hordes beyond the walls, and to become leader of Jorvik. There are other factions vying for control of Jorvik however, and depending on the player's actions they will either become friends, or hinder the protagonist's progress.

== Reception ==
Since its release, the game has generally been received warmly by reviewers and gamers. One notable disappointment among reviewers and fans is the lack of multiplayer. The reason for no multiplayer, according to Steven Peeler, lead designer and programmer of Depths of Peril, is that they wanted to focus on the singleplayer experience first, before attempting multiplayer. Peeler hopes to include multiplayer in a future expansion pack.

== Gallery ==
The main interface.

The map interface.

The covenant (faction) relation screen.

== Modding ==
Soldak Entertainment has also released a modding SDK for Depths of Peril. The mod allows players to directly impact the way the game is played, from basic things such as raising or lowering the game difficulty to changing game dynamics (e.g. lowering or increasing damage done/taken, or increasing the size of your adventuring party).

== Related games ==
Soldak Entertainment has published two subsequent games based on the Depths of Peril storyline and game engine. Din's Curse is a single or cooperative multiplayer dungeon-delving role-playing game without the political aspects of Depths of Peril, and Kivi's Underworld is a single-player hack-n-slash arcade-style adventure game. Both games expand on the storyline and universe introduced in Depths of Peril. Din's Curse introduces improved 3D graphics and the ability to host games for multiplayer play to the game engine.
