= Kivi's Underworld =

2008 video game

- Developer(s): Soldak Entertainment
- Platform(s): Windows, macOS
- Release: November 4, 2008
- Genre(s): action role-playing game
- Mode(s): Single-player

Kivi's Underworld is a hack-and-slash action role-playing game. It was developed by Soldak Entertainment and was released on November 4, 2008. In Kivi's Underworld you explore a mysterious underworld as one of several classes, including warrior, mage, scout and berserker, with the goal of rebuilding the lost city of Defiance and defeating the dark elves, who threaten to destroy your homeland.

== Overview ==
Kivi's Underworld has a unique progression system that derives from other computer ARPGs of the time. The game has simple combat and it is focused on unlocking multiple characters that each play differently. After completing a level, the player earns points that can be used to upgrade stats that can affect all characters at once.

== Reception ==
Since its release, the game has generally been received warmly by reviewers and gamers, being compared to Depths of Peril, but with a more straight dungeon-hacking focus and the addition of a multiplayer mode.

== Modding ==
Soldak Entertainment has also released a modding SDK for Kivi's Underworld. There are only a few basic mods that have been made, most of which translate the game into a different language.
