= Soldak Entertainment =

American video game company

- Company type: Private
- Industry: Video games
- Genre: RPG
- Founded: November 22, 2004
- Founder: Steven Peeler
- Headquarters: U.S.A.
- Key people: Steven Peeler
- Number of employees: 2
- Website: soldak.com

Soldak Entertainment is a small independent company that was founded by Steven Peeler on November 22, 2004. The company released Windows Depths of Peril on September 5, 2007, followed by a Mac version of the game on June 6, 2008. On November 3, 2008, the company released their first dual platform game Kivi's Underworld, with the expansion being issued 6 months later on June 9, 2009. Their second dual platform game, Din's Curse was released on March 31, 2010. Their third full game, known as "Drox Operative" was released on November 29, 2012.

== Games developed ==
- Depths of Peril
- Kivi's Underworld
- Din's Curse
- Din's Curse: Demon War
- Drox Operative
- Zombasite
- Din's Legacy (2019)
- Drox Operative 2
- Din's Champion
