= The Age of Decadence =

2015 video game

- Developer: Iron Tower Studio
- Publisher: Iron Tower Studio
- Director: Vince D. Weller
- Designer: Vince D. Weller
- Programmer: Nick Skolozdra
- Artist: Oscar Velzi
- Composer: Ryan Eston
- Engine: Torque 3D
- Platform: Microsoft Windows
- Release: October 14, 2015
- Genre: Role-playing
- Mode: Single-player

The Age of Decadence is a single-player, turn-based role-playing video game for Microsoft Windows developed by Iron Tower Studio, led by the pseudonymous "Vince D. Weller". Set in a low-magic, post-apocalyptic world inspired by the fall of the Roman Empire, the game aims to return to the 'golden era' of role-playing games by emphasizing choices and consequences and providing multiple solutions to quests.

== Gameplay ==
=== Character ===
The player can choose from eight backgrounds and professions for their character at the start of the game. These range from the honor-bound knight to the crafty grifter. The player can also choose to start with no background at all. Different backgrounds result in very different gameplay styles. A background determines a character's initial relationship to various factions. A thief, for example, starts as a member of the Thieves Guild and gets reputation bonuses with other thieves but reputation penalties with enemies. Backgrounds are not classes. They do not restrict or guide a character's future attributes or skills. The Age of Decadence uses a skill-based system, not a class-based system. Characters do not gain levels, but they gain skill points by completing quests or defeating enemies.

The Age of Decadence supports some customization. Players may choose their appearance (e.g. skin color and hair style) and gender. The choice of gender affects gameplay. Some quests are only available to males or females, and character can receive bonuses to some skills depending on their gender (e.g. males get bonuses to intimidate.) Characters have several primary stats: strength (affects damage), dexterity (affects action points), constitution (affects hitpoints), perception (affects chance to hit), intelligence (affects skill point bonuses), and charisma (affects non-player character reactions). Stats range from 4 to 10 and characters who achieve 10 can gain bonus traits.

=== Skills ===
The Age of Decadence features 23 distinct skills. These range from those pertaining to combat (e.g. Critical Strike) to those that meet miscellaneous needs (e.g. Impersonate and Lore). The Age of Decadence is purported to have a detailed crafting and alchemy system. These skills can be used to melt old items and forge new ones, poison weapons, create acid, etc.

=== Combat ===
Combat in The Age of Decadence is turn-based and focuses heavily on tactical options. The options available partially depend on the attributes, skills, and equipment of the character. For instance, hammers allow a character to knock down enemies, axes can split shields, swords can disarm opponents, daggers ignore armor, and so on. Characters can aim for specific body parts. The game does not have party-based combat—the main character does not have any "followers." However, in some situations a character will receive aid from guards, from members of his own faction, etc. These non-player characters are controlled by the game AI and by scripts, not the player. The best fighters are only capable of taking on a few people at the same time. Healing potions cannot be used to recover hitpoints during combat.

=== Quests ===
The Age of Decadence features dialogue trees. Certain dialog options require skill checks. These skill checks are against set numbers. There is no rolling. There are allegedly more than 100 quests in The Age of Decadence and they will have multiple solutions, including options for pacifism and diplomacy. Each quest can be handled in a variety of ways, depending on the character's skills, reputation, and connections to different factions. Furthermore, different quest solutions have different consequences, some of which will be dramatic. There are no plot-critical NPCs. There is always more than one way to acquire plot-critical information. The player is not restricted from killing (or at least attempting to kill) certain 'special' NPCs.

== Story ==
The story of The Age of Decadence explores several themes: the dangers of a post-apocalyptic world, and the competition among political factions.

According to the Imperial Scrolls, the wicked kingdom of Qantaar and the Empire were locked in a bloody magical war that devastated much of the known world. Each side called upon powers both arcane and divine, summoning gods and other beings of immense power, whose contest ultimately destroyed both sides. Cities of the once glorious Empire lay in ruin, and bodies of the dead were strewn across the land. Centuries later, the world still suffers from the shadow of civilization's collapse. it is in this uneasy divided land of myth and fable that the player discovers an ancient map offering a hint to the Empire's true past.

The player's character has an active role in shaping the plot of The Age of Decadence, which is nonlinear. The world reacts dynamically to the player's actions. Players can choose from among seven factions, play them off against each other, or even reject them all. The game is purported to have seven endings, only two of which involve mortal combat.

== Development ==
The Iron Tower Studio team started work on the game in March 2004. The team developed the game for Microsoft Windows using the Torque video game engine. A Linux port is unlikely due to team's concerns about inability to properly support the release on this platform. Software releases began with a combat demo in December 2009. Two later releases of the combat demo fixed bugs and addressed issues like game balance. In March 2012, Iron Tower Studio released a public beta (version 0.8.6) of the game which was feature-complete except for Alchemy but only had one town.

In January 2013, Valve announced that The Age of Decadence had been selected for advancement through the Steam Greenlight program. The game has entered Early Access stage on November 15, 2013, and was released on October 14, 2015, simultaneously on Steam and GOG.

== Reception ==
Reception

Aggregate score
| Aggregator | Score |
|---|---|
| Metacritic | 81/100 |

The game received generally positive reviews, and has a score of 81/100 on Metacritic. Destructoid awarded it a score of 9 out of 10, saying "It may have some rough spots, but it is one of the most well-designed RPGs I have had the pleasure of enjoying.". Destructoid praised the decision making in the game, where instead of good and evil, players choose from different alliances and houses with game changing consequences. However slight criticism was made on the combat being 'clunky' and 'a bit rough around the edges', moreover player character customization was seen as 'very confusing and frustrating'.

Within the first week of release, The Age of Decadence sold more than 10,000 copies. Iron Tower Studio announced on June 25, 2026, almost eleven years later, that the game had reached a milestone of 250,000 copies sold.

== Legacy ==
In 2016, Iron Tower announced Dungeon Rats, a party-based tactical-RPG spin-off to The Age of Decadence. The game was released on November 4, 2016.

In 2023, Iron Tower released Colony Ship: A Post-Earth Role Playing Game, a science fiction role-playing game that is said to be similar to The Age of Decadence. It was first released on early access on April 6, 2021.
