= Icewind Dale II =

Role-playing video game by Black Isle Studios

- Developer: Black Isle Studios
- Publisher: Interplay Entertainment
- Producer: Darren Monahan
- Designers: J.E. Sawyer; Chris Avellone
- Programmer: Bernie Weir
- Artists: Tim Donley; Pete Meihuizen
- Composer: Inon Zur
- Series: Icewind Dale
- Engine: Infinity Engine
- Platform: Windows
- Release: NA: August 27, 2002; UK: August 30, 2002
- Genre: Role-playing
- Modes: Single-player, multiplayer

Icewind Dale II is a role-playing video game developed by Black Isle Studios and published by Interplay Entertainment, released on August 27, 2002. Like its 2000 predecessor Icewind Dale, the game is set in the Forgotten Realms fantasy setting in the Icewind Dale region. The player assumes control of a group of mercenaries in a war between the Ten Towns of Icewind Dale and a coalition of persecuted races and religions.

The game is designed as an action-oriented alternative to other Infinity Engine games, with less emphasis on exploration and story. It uses a real-time adaptation of the Dungeons & Dragons (D&D) Third Edition ruleset. The Infinity Engine was modified to comply with the Third Edition, but the team was forced to remove certain rules because of the engine's outdated nature. It was the final game to be developed using the Infinity Engine.

The game was well received by critics, who praised its combat, pacing, and use of the Third Edition rules. However, some reviewers felt that the graphics and engine had become outdated, and could not compete with its contemporaries.

== Gameplay ==
Icewind Dale II is a real-time adaptation of the D&D Third Edition ruleset. The game is viewed from an isometric perspective, and a head-up display (HUD) occupies the bottom of the screen. Accessible from the HUD are an automap and a journal that records quests and important events. The player uses a point-and-click interface to interact with the game; for example, clicking on the ground moves the selected player character, and clicking on a passive non-player character (NPC) will initiate dialogue. When conversations occur, the game presents multiple dialogue options. The game world is separated into area maps—obscured by fog of war—that are revealed as the area is explored. A multiplayer mode is available for up to six players over a local area network or the Internet. The "Heart of Fury" mode is also available, which increases the game's difficulty and contains more powerful items. The game features over seven hundred items; the designers included a system that randomizes the items the player obtains from enemies.

Example of the main screen

When beginning the game, the player may choose to play a pre-selected party, or to create a party of up to six characters; unlike the Baldur's Gate series, Icewind Dale II does not permit the player to import characters from previous Icewind Dale games. While creating characters, the player chooses their gender, race, class, alignment, and attributes, among other things. The player can sometimes choose a subvariety of a race or class, such as Deep Gnome or Cleric of Ilmater. Race, alignment, and attributes affect the player character's available dialogue options, as well as NPC responses. For example, some NPCs will be prejudiced against certain races, or a character of low intelligence will have limited dialogue options. Some sub-races in the game are significantly more powerful than the core races present in D&D Third Edition; these sub-races must earn more experience points than others before leveling up. Characters can reach a maximum level of thirty. It is possible to add additional characters to the party at any time, including during combat.

Icewind Dale II's gameplay is focused on combat. The combat system is a real-time adaptation of the turn-based system used in D&D Third Edition, which caused the developers to remove certain aspects, such as "attacks of opportunity". Dice rolls are simulated by the game. In place of the turn-based rounds used in D&D, characters have independent rounds, during which they may execute one or more actions, depending on such factors as the duration of the action. The player can pause the game and issue orders to characters at any time. Each character can carry a limited amount of items.

== Plot ==
=== Setting ===
Icewind Dale II takes place in the Forgotten Realms D&D campaign setting, on the continent of Faerûn. It centers on the northern Icewind Dale region, and is set thirty years after the original game. The game begins in the harbor town of Targos, one of the Ten Towns of Icewind Dale, which is under siege by a goblin army. The goblins are directed by the Legion of the Chimera, an army composed of outcast races and religious factions, such as goblinoids, half-breeds, and followers of winter goddess Auril. Targos hires mercenaries to defend against the attack. Areas encountered in the game include: the Black Raven Monastery, built over an entrance to the Underdark; the town of Kuldahar, constructed around a magical tree that emits heat; the Severed Hand, an ancient elven fortress that was lost during a war with goblinoids; and the Dragon's Eye, a network of volcanic caverns inhabited by yuan-ti. Other areas include the Underdark and the Jungles of Chult.

=== Story ===
The game begins as the player's group of mercenaries arrives by ship to defend Targos. They report to the town palisade and fend off an assault by the goblin army. Afterward, the mayor of Targos orders them to launch an offensive against the goblin army. The group kills the army's chieftain and discovers he was under the command of a woman named Sherincal. When they return to Targos, the mayor asks them to rendezvous with reinforcements from Neverwinter. The group travels to meet them in an airship piloted by Oswald Fiddlebender.

A storm causes the ship to crash, and the group awakens to discover that a glacier blocks the reinforcements' path. While investigating the glacier, the group finds Sherincal, a half-dragon, guarding the entrance to an Aurilite temple. They learn that Sherincal leads the Legion of the Chimera's western forces and the leaders of the Legion of the Chimera, cambion twins named Isair and Madae, reside in the Severed Hand. Inside the Aurilite temple, the group finds a prisoner from Kuldahar, who asks them to warn Kuldahar of the threat posed by the Legion of the Chimera. The group then creates a passage through the glacier and meets with the reinforcements.

As the group travels to Kuldahar, they meet a drow (dark elf) named Nym, who tells them the pass to Kuldahar is guarded by the Legion of the Chimera and an alternate path through the Underdark exists. Later, Isair and Madae locate the group with information from Nym. They state their intention to attack Kuldahar and warn the group to not interfere. The group then passes through the Black Raven Monastery to enter the Underdark. After exiting the Underdark, they are flown to Kuldahar by Oswald Fiddlebender.

When the group lands in Kuldahar, they discover it has been invaded by the Legion of the Chimera. They meet the Archdruid of Kuldahar, who tells them that a portal has been opened to allow yuan-ti from the jungles of Chult to assault Kuldahar. After the group prevents the attack, the Archdruid tells them they may reach the Severed Hand through an exit on the bottom floor of the Dragon's Eye. The group travels through the Dragon's Eye and proceeds to the Severed Hand. Once inside, they learn that the war between the Ten Towns and the Legion of the Chimera was caused by the mayor of Bryn Shander, who had sent Isair and Madae poisoned food. They also discover that a mythal that was cast on the Severed Hand has been corrupted, and the structure will be transported to the plane of limbo. Eventually, the group finds Isair and Madae and kills them.

== Development ==
During summer 2001, Black Isle Studios employed three development teams. These included the Icewind Dale team, the team developing Torn, and a team working on an unannounced project. Before and during Torn's development, several members of its team expressed interest in developing another game using the Infinity Engine. The development team was not made aware of Black Isle Studios' decision to develop Icewind Dale II until Torn's cancellation. Lead designer J. E. Sawyer described: "I don't know when the producers decided to make the game, but I was told that we were making the game when I learned that TORN was being cancelled ... on a Wednesday afternoon, and that Feargus Urquhart asked me to work with Steve Bokkes to create a story and area overview by Thursday afternoon. Steve and I talked about it for the rest of the day. I went home that night and worked on the overviews until the next day. I came in and turned the docs in, and after the Friday division meeting, the project was in development". During this period, Interplay Entertainment relied on Black Isle Studios' games to alleviate financial trouble, which put pressure to release games quickly. The decision to develop Icewind Dale II was based partly on the original Icewind Dale's reception, and the development teams' ability to create a game with the Infinity Engine relatively quickly. Sawyer said of the decision: "In all honesty, the reasons for making Icewind Dale II have to do with limiting risks and maximizing our chances for a popular title". Conceptualization of Icewind Dale II progressed during the development of the Icewind Dale expansions, and production began late July 2001, shortly after the completion of Icewind Dale: Trials of the Luremaster. After six months of development, Icewind Dale II was officially announced on February 4, 2002.

Icewind Dale II was originally planned to be an incomplete conversion to the D&D Third Edition ruleset, with many rules omitted. The kit system (class specialization) introduced in Baldur's Gate 2 was to be used, but this idea was later abandoned. Sawyer and several other members of the team pushed for the game's conversion to Third Edition. The development team was eventually granted an extension, which allowed them to complete the change to Third Edition rules. The Infinity Engine required extensive modification to comply with Third Edition rules, as it had originally been designed for Second Edition rules; certain elements of the rules were removed due to interface and engine issues. The game's interface was redesigned, and all-new art was created. It features new item icons, with new spell icons by Brian Menze; Menze had previously created Planescape: Torment's spell icons. Jason Manley, the portrait artist for the previous Icewind Dale games, left Black Isle Studios in late 2001; several new works he painted before his departure were later used in Icewind Dale II. Black Isle Studios artist Justin Sweet was asked to substitute. The game's resolution was increased to a minimum resolution of 800x600, with an unofficially supported maximum resolution of 2048x1536.

J. E. Sawyer managed rule implementation, but the areas of the game were divided between designers. For example, designer Chris Avellone created the opening sequence, designer Dave Maldonado developed the Black Raven Monastery and a large area of wilderness, and designers John Deiley and Damien Foletto created the ending areas. Partway through development, Sawyer left the team to work as the lead designer on another internal project; Dave Maldonado and Chris Avellone were given his areas to finish. The developers wanted the game to contain more breaks from combat, with character interaction and puzzle solving, than the previous Icewind Dale. The decision to include more puzzles was influenced by the positive reception to the puzzles in Icewind Dale: Trials of the Luremaster.

The game went gold on August 5, 2002, and was released in North America on August 27 and in the United Kingdom on August 30. After the release of Icewind Dale II, Sawyer expressed dissatisfaction over the Icewind Dale series, saying "I wasn't particularly thrilled with how my work on [Icewind Dale] came out..." and, "...[Heart of Winter] managed to actually be worse than my Icewind Dale stuff". In regards to Icewind Dale II he said: "[It] came out better than I expected, but still, not exactly awe-inspiring". Chris Avellone later said: "Icewind Dale was a fun series, but it didn't try to set the bar for anything other than a fun romp. People may remember enjoying it, but it wasn’t trying to break any new ground or do anything revolutionary. In some respects, it was almost a step back from other games we'd done and focused more on exploration and dungeon crawls". A Collector's Edition containing bonus material, such as a full-color cloth map and soundtrack CD, was also released. Icewind Dale II was the final game developed using the Infinity Engine.

=== Audio ===
The music of the game was composed by Inon Zur, whose previous works included Baldur's Gate 2: Throne of Bhaal and Fallout Tactics. Inon Zur worked with Jeremy Soule, the composer for Icewind Dale, to maintain the tone of the music. Inon Zur also worked closely with Interplay audio director Adam Levenson while composing the music; Zur and Levenson had worked together on several previous titles. Inon Zur said that while composing the theme for the game, "I wrote and rewrote the main theme several times", and "we tried to create a piece that would preserve the sound of the first Icewind Dale[...] we made great efforts to convey the new elements also. Capturing all of this in 30–45 seconds was not easy however I believe that we eventually found the right path for this game's soundtrack". Zur described the composing process: "After learning the storyboard and getting additional insight from the producers/music supervisor I'll start to compose. The thematic idea (main melody or rhythmical groove) comes first. Then comes the accompaniment followed by the orchestration and that each piece should have its own unique flavour so every step is carefully examined. I have to make sure that the main idea of the piece is reflected in all these steps". He called the composing experience "pleasant" and "rewarding".

The music was composed in five weeks, and the recording and mixing lasted three weeks. As the game's music budget was low, a small Los Angeles orchestra was used to record the music; the sound of the each instrument was doubled during production. Inon Zur described the music as having "some uniqueness to it, that basically it developed throughout the game [with] the [inclusion] of more instruments, taking flutes and percussion and combining them with the standard orchestra". Zur later said: "I thought that we definitely met some high standards; we compared our products to big budget films scores and in the end we were quite happy". The game features voice work from Gabrielle Carteris, Peter Stormare, and Grey DeLisle, among others.

== Reception ==
=== Sales ===
Icewind Dale II debuted at #6 on The NPD Group's weekly computer game sales chart for the August 25–31 period, at an average retail price of $45. The game rose to fourth place the following week, and exited the weekly top 10 in its third week. It was North America's 20th-best-selling computer game of August 2002 and 14th-best-selling of September. Icewind Dale II sold between 100,000 and 270,000 copies in the United States alone by August 2006. Combined sales of the Icewind Dale franchise reached 580,000 units in the country by that date.

=== Critical reviews ===
Reception

Aggregate scores
Aggregator	Score
GameRankings	82%
Metacritic	83/100

Review scores
Publication	Score
Computer Games Magazine	4/5
Computer Gaming World	4.5/5
G4	4/5
Game Informer	9.5/10
GameSpot	8.3/10
IGN	9/10
PC Format	65%
PC Gamer (US)	87%
PC Zone	8.3/10

Icewind Dale II's reception was generally positive. Game Informer hailed it as, "one of the best RPGs ever released for the PC", and GameSpot called it, "simply a great role-playing game". However, PC Format said, "it's uninspired and uninspiring, giving itself a narrow remit and fulfilling that unspectacularly". Certain reviewers compared Icewind Dale II to Neverwinter Nights. IGN said: "[Compared to Neverwinter Nights] the pace of [Icewind Dale II] is more varied, its balance better, the gameplay more interesting", and Game Informer considered the interface superior to that of Neverwinter Nights. PC Format said, "in the light of Neverwinter Nights in particular, there's little that stands out in Icewind Dale II to recommend it", and PC Zone concurred "it's not the [Baldur's Gate II: Shadows of Amn] killer we had all hoped for and neither does it stack up to Neverwinter Nights".

Many reviewers praised the game's combat and pacing. G4 called the game's combat "sublime", and said that "no Infinity Engine game thus far has had such interesting and intricate tactical combat". GameSpot called it "expertly paced." PC Zone complained that certain gameplay mechanics had become outdated, but that "the only real downer is the antiquated spell system and the inexplicable necessity to rest after every fight". The game was also praised for its implementation of the Third Edition rules and interface. Computer Gaming World said that "[Icewind Dale II] has the Third Edition rules down, and in no other place in the game is it more apparent than with character development", and PC Gamer said it had "a dazzling implementation of the D&D 3rd Edition rules". GameSpot called the interface "a big improvement on the spread-out interface of all previous Infinity Engine games", and IGN said that "the customization improvements to the interface that seem so natural, they make you wonder why they weren't thought of before". Game Informer called the interface "absolutely inspired" and its inventory system "second to none".

The game was criticized for its graphics and engine, which reviewers considered to be outdated. G4 called the engine "old" and "clunky", and PC Format said that "the whole thing is limited by the creaking engine". On the other hand, certain sources praised the engine. Game Informer called it "the best role-playing engine that has ever been invented", and GameSpot said that "'immortal' may be a better word to describe the engine, because the fact is, Icewind Dale II plays great". In regards to the graphics, GameSpot said that "in many ways Icewind Dale II represents the best use of the Infinity Engine's prerendered, isometric settings to date, [but] that doesn't change the fact that Icewind Dale II generally looks dated". IGN thought the sprites had become out-dated, and that "the animations are crude by today's standards". New Straits Times agreed, saying that although some of the effects were attractive, the "dated Infinity Engine" could not compare to contemporaries Dungeon Siege and Neverwinter Nights. Computer Gaming World believed that "it consistently offers the same striking and imaginative environments that establish the tone and immersive charm of the game", and Computer Games Magazine said "it may not look like much, but it's got it where it counts". The game's pre-rendered backgrounds received praise. IGN said that "the artwork is attractive, both conceptually and in its final form", and Game Informer called them "beautiful". Many reviewers complained about the game's pathfinding AI, which PC Zone called "outrageously bad".

Game Informer called the writing and story "on par with any fantasy novel". PC Gamer said it had "some of the richest and most enjoyable dialogue since Planescape Torment", and an "impressive storyline". GameSpot called the story "engrossing", and said that "the game is very well written, offering up a number of strong characters and serious themes". PC Zone noted that, "thanks to the excellent NPCs, the battles have a lot more meaning, as there is a strong storyline behind the endless hacking and slashing". PC Format thought that "Icewind Dale II also suffers, like its predecessor, from a story irrevocably weakened by anonymous central characters – the six you create". In regards to the audio, GameSpot said that "Inon Zur does a truly fantastic job that's perhaps even better than Soule's effort in the original Icewind Dale", and that "the voice acting in Icewind Dale II is as great as you've perhaps come to expect from a Black Isle Studios role-playing game". Computer Gaming World said that "[the] sound effects, music, and voiceovers are all excellent".

Icewind Dale II was nominated for Computer Gaming World's 2002 "RPG of the Year" award, which ultimately went to The Elder Scrolls III: Morrowind. The editors wrote that Icewind Dale II "is the last great game from a fading engine, and we love it". It was also a nominee for PC Gamer US's "2002 Best Roleplaying Game" and The Electric Playground's "Best RPG for PC" awards, but lost both to Neverwinter Nights. Allen Rausch, writing for GameSpy's 2004 retrospective "A History of D&D Video Games", wrote "while nobody would mistake it for '2002 RPG of the Year' material, Black Isle Studios managed to give the Infinity engine a terrific game as its swan song".

== Enhanced Edition ==
Other Infinity Engine games, including Baldur's Gate and Icewind Dale, have been remade into Enhanced Editions by Beamdog. Beamdog was unsuccessful in trying to do the same for Icewind Dale II due to the source code of the game being lost.

The Red Chimera Group, a team of modders, coders, artists, and other contributors drawn from the Infinity Engine community, re-built Icewind Dale II and produced an Enhanced Edition. The Enhanced Edition features streamlined gameplay, a rebalanced class system, and new content. The team used WeiDU, a program used to develop, distribute and install modifications for games based on the Infinity Engine. The Enhanced Edition was released on November 4, 2023.
