= Baldur's Gate: Enhanced Edition =

2012 video game

- Developer: Overhaul Games
- Publishers: Atari; Beamdog; Skybound Games (consoles)
- Director: Trent Oster
- Composer: Sam Hulick
- Series: Baldur's Gate
- Engine: Infinity Engine
- Platforms: Microsoft Windows, iOS, OS X, Android, Linux, Nintendo Switch, PlayStation 4, Xbox One
- Release: Microsoft Windows; November 28, 2012 iOS; December 7, 2012; OS X February 22, 2013; Android; April 17, 2014; Linux; November 27, 2014; Nintendo Switch, PlayStation 4, Xbox One; October 15, 2019
- Genre: Role-playing
- Modes: Single-player, multiplayer

Baldur's Gate: Enhanced Edition is a 2012 role-playing video game developed by Overhaul Games, a division of Beamdog, and published by Atari. It was released for Microsoft Windows on November 28, 2012, with additional releases between 2012 and 2014 for iPad, OS X, Android and Linux and most recently for Xbox One, PlayStation 4, and Nintendo Switch on October 15, 2019. It is a remaster of the 1998 game Baldur's Gate and its expansion, Baldur's Gate: Tales of the Sword Coast, retaining the original elements from both (story, in-game locations, gameplay and characters), while including additions, a separate arena adventure entitled The Black Pits, and a number of improvements some of which were imported from Baldur's Gate II: Shadows of Amn.

An expansion was released for the remaster in March 2016, Baldur's Gate: Siege of Dragonspear, which focuses on the events following the conclusion of Baldur's Gate, that lead up to Baldur's Gate II: Shadows of Amn.

== Gameplay ==
Much like the original game, Baldur's Gate: Enhanced Edition follows the rules of the 2nd Edition Advanced Dungeons & Dragons, licensed by Wizards of the Coast and features both single-player and multiplayer modes, while much of the gameplay, such as moving between locations, the "paper doll" equipment system, and inventory management, remains the same as the original game.

The user interface for the Windows version; an update in 2016, coinciding with the game's expansion, improved the Journal system with an overlay for the main game screen, along with separation of quest logs and an on-screen prompt when quests are started, updated, or completed.

Enhanced Edition has several new features compared to the original game. Features created for the remaster include cross-platform functionality for the multiplayer mode, allowing players on different platforms to be able to play with each other, the addition of a stand-alone arena adventure, The Black Pits, in which players form a party of six adventurers and battle against increasingly difficult opponents, the addition of four characters, each having their own dialogue and some having their own associated adventures, with bonus quest enemies that have been added to the game described as posing a "more vigorous challenge", five class kits - the Dwarven Defender, Shadowdancer, Dragon Disciple, Dark Moon Monk and Sun Soul Monk, a few locations added to the game, an achievement system (for Steam versions only), and two difficulty modes - Story Mode, and Legacy of Bhaal. Story Mode is an enhanced version of Easy difficulty, in which all characters in the party cannot die, have a strength stat of 25 (regardless of the actual value) and are immune to most negative effects, while all enemies can be damaged and killed easily. Legacy of Bhaal, in contrast, is an enhanced version of Insane difficulty, with enemies having more hit points, saving throws, THAC0 and attacks per round, while the difficulty cannot be changed once implemented by the player.

Some of the major improvements to the original game that are incorporated into the remaster, include a revamped user interface, the ability to play at higher resolutions as well as different viewing modes including widescreen, increased flexibility to mod the game, a new renderer, multiplayer matchmaking abilities (at the time of launch, this function was in a beta state), updates to the map and journal system, the level cap for the remaster being raised, and the importation of improvements and some elements from both Baldur's Gate II: Shadows of Amn and its expansion pack, including classes, subraces and class kits, that were not available in the original game; a later patch the romance element from Baldur's Gate II is also incorporated, but only the new characters have this implemented. The developers included an auto-update function, with further modifications made to the remaster based on suggestions made by users.

The iPad and Android versions are described as a radical departure from the game's original interface, allowing for zooming in and out via multi-touch gestures, which allows for larger text. The tablet versions allow for users to swipe between screens instead of clicking on tabs. Ex-Bioware employee and creative director for the enhanced edition Trent Oster said: "When I describe playing a Baldur's Gate combat scenario to someone, I use the analogy of a football playbook. ... When you think about Baldur's Gate in this light, the iPad makes so much sense. In fact, I think Baldur's Gate is almost the perfect game for the touch interface—it was just released a decade early".

== Synopsis ==
Much of the game retains the original setting of Baldur's Gate and its expansion - that of the Forgotten Realms continent of Faerûn, the city of Baldur's Gate and the locations south of it within the regions of the Sword Coast and the Western Heartlands, including Beregost, Nashkel, Durlag's Tower and Candlekeep. The main story, too, is still retained - the player creates a character and takes them across the game's setting to investigate the iron crisis that is plunging Baldur's Gate towards a war with the neighbouring nation of Amn, uncovering it as the work of the game's main villain, Sarevok. All of the original characters that can join the player's party, and the quests that can be undertaken from both the main game and the expansion, still present within the remaster. The Enhanced Edition adds four non-player characters (NPCs) that can join the party, with three incorporating standalone story-lines (an element used with NPCs in Baldur's Gate II) of which two feature new locations.

The standalone arena adventure created for the remaster, The Black Pits, features a story set before the main events of Baldur's Gate, in which players create their own party of adventurers, in a similar fashion to that of the Icewind Dale series, and undertake battles in an area situated in a small portion of the Underdark, though there is little to do in terms of exploration except for the holding cells the party can move around within.

=== The Black Pits ===
Prior to the events of Baldur's Gate, a colony of Duergar dwarves is defeated by a mad drow sorcerer named Baeloth, who imprisons them and forces them to create an entertainment complex of his own design within the Underdark. Through his complex, the Black Pits, Baeloth assumes the title of "Baeloth the Entertainer", and draws in living creatures, monsters and adventurers from throughout the realms, either by invitation or forcefully capturing them, and pitting them against each other for loot. All who are brought to the Pits are imprisoned under the effects of a geas and cannot escape, eventually being killed during one of Baeloth's matches, with the exception of a champion, who was pitted against Baeloth himself after winning all their matches, but dying against the sorcerer. Baeloth's latest victims, a party of six adventurers (whose origins and past remain a mystery), survive their qualifying match and find themselves coerced into fighting in the Black Pits, learning that the drow is aided by a djinn named Najim, while their holding cells include several prisoners forced to operate as merchants, and a beholder who offers advice on the matches the party encounter.

Over time, with each successful match, Baeloth becomes increasingly frustrated at their survival against the tougher monsters he brings in, while some of merchants express support for their victories, along with hope that they may become free. Eventually, after becoming champions of the Pits, Baeloth decides to take the group on himself, expecting to defeat them and eliminate them so as to provide the crowds with some new fighters to root for. However, the match ends with Baeloth defeated himself and his geas on all of the complex's prisoners lifted. Najim, grateful of his freedom, helps the party escape, knowing that the duergar clan they freed will see them as outsiders and not accept them. The party swiftly leave by a portal, and enjoy their freedom soon afterwards.

== Development ==
Work on creating the Enhanced Editions of the first two Baldur's Gate games began with negotiations between Beamdog and the game's owners, Atari and Wizards of the Coast, which lasted for approximately fourteen months before a contract was arranged and agreed upon. Along with this, the developer also sought out a license from BioWare for use of the Infinity Engine for the original game's remaster. During development, Beamdog made the decision to openly expand the number of platforms that the two Enhanced Editions would be on. Baldur's Gate: Enhanced Edition was to have a November 2012 release date and released for both PC and iPad, with the iPad version designed to make it compatible with all three generations (at the time) of the handheld device. OS X version was also confirmed for release, with the main art content creation program used to make content for the re-forged Infinity Engine being revealed as 3DS Max. Plans for console version of the game were shelved, after developer Trent Oster revealed that an Xbox 360 version of the game could not be made as the controller was not a good fit for it, and a Wii U version was not made after the developers' negative experience with Nintendo while developing MDK2 HD. Another console version, planned for the PlayStation 3, was also cancelled after negotiations between Sony and Beamdog, the former having contacted the developer first about this, broke down over the funding needed for the redesign of the game for the console; Oster revealed that the redesign cost would have been high, due to the amount of work required to fix the controls and make the UI of the game work for the PlayStation 3. Oster later revealed that due to fan demand, time for more thought to be put into a console edition had been allocated to after the release of Baldur's Gate II: Enhanced Edition. The team also initially looked into a retail edition due to fan demand, later clarifying that it would likely be a collector's edition, but discussion on the matter later led to the possibility being unlikely.

For assistance on the game, Nat Jones was recruited as the art director for the project, with senior Dungeons & Dragons writer Dave Gross brought in on the team as a writer, and Sam Hulick composing additional music for the game. Overhaul also reached out to the modding community of the original Baldur's Gate games for further assistance in their efforts to revive the classic RPG. Speculations raised in August 2012 that the resurrection of Black Isle Studios, the producers of the original Baldur's Gate games, would see Overhaul co-develop the game with them, but they were dismissed by Beamdog who responded that there were no plans to do so, although they wished the new studio luck. The game's first playable demo was revealed at PAX Prime 2012. While plans were made to release the game on September 18, delays caused the launch date to be pushed back, due to the amount of work being done to create it in 16 different languages, including English, French, German and Spanish, further improvements to its gameplay, and fixing glitches pointed out to them before launch. In order to make up for the delay, Overhaul revealed information that the game would include further additions to it that the original did not have, including new characters, areas, story and hours of gameplay.

== Release ==
Baldur's Gate: Enhanced Edition was officially released on November 30, 2012, but due to contract obligations, the game's Windows version was launched on the Beamdog website and also via download from its Client program (although Beamdog Client is not required to play the game after initial activation), while the iPad version was launched on Apple's App Store, and the OS X version on the Mac App Store. The game was released on Steam on January 16, 2013. The Linux version of the game was released on November 27, 2014, after being delayed earlier that year on July 1, with Trent Oster explaining on Twitter that the decision to do so was to wait until after the release of a patch to update the game to version 1.3., as part of an improved commitment to quality releases.

Baldur's Gate: Enhanced Edition was removed from sale on Beamdog's website and the Apple App Store in June 2013, due to contractual issues. The issues were resolved within less than a month, and the game became available for sale at both outlets once again on August 15. Further extensive work was made on the game, with patches released by the developer to fix glitches and problems encountered by players for all available versions of the game. News of updates were often released on their official forums; in August 2014, Beamdog announced the roll-out of a patch (version 1.3.2053) on their forums, stating that it was to be made immediately available to all versions of the game, adding that it had "..submitted to Apple for approval" prior to rolling it out on the Mac and iTunes App Stores.

Console versions for Nintendo Switch, PlayStation 4, and Xbox One were released on October 15, 2019 by Skybound Games.

== Reception ==
Reception

Aggregate score
Aggregator	Score
Metacritic	PC: 78/100 iOS: 73/100

Review scores
Publication	Score
Destructoid	8.5/10
Eurogamer	8/10
GameSpot	6/10
IGN	8.1/10
Nintendo Life	8/10
PC Gamer (US)	77/100
TouchArcade	3.5/5
The Escapist	4/5
Inside Gaming	8.5/10

Baldur's Gate: Enhanced Edition received mostly favorable reviews from critics; on aggregate review website Metacritic the game attains an overall score of 78 out of 100 on the PC. Shacknews praised the remaster, calling the game "a truly enhanced version of a classic game". IGN gave the game 8.1, saying that despite having several changes, Baldur's Gate has aged well, and that new players will have hours of fun, but also noted that players will have to approach it with an understanding of its increasingly "antiquated" framework. Role-playing game website GameBanshee gave the game a poor review, listing many bugs and oversights and commenting that they prefer the original version over Enhanced Edition due to former having hundreds of mods and bug fix packs, and costing less than the latter version. GameSpy concurred with this, questioning whether $20 was a fair price, but they commended cross-platform support.

As of 2015, the Enhanced Edition sold over a million copies.

== Sequels ==
After the financial success of enhanced editions of Baldur's Gate and Baldur's Gate II, Overhaul Games expressed interest to develop Baldur's Gate 3, describing it as their "long-term goal". The success of the enhanced editions led to their decision to remaster Icewind Dale and Planescape: Torment, using rules from Baldur's Gate: Enhanced Edition, and the Infinity Enhanced Engine.

Following its launch, the game was succeeded by Baldur's Gate II: Enhanced Edition on November 15, 2013, a remaster that combined Baldur's Gate II: Shadows of Amn with its expansion Baldur's Gate II: Throne of Bhaal, while including the new classes and content from Baldur's Gate: Enhanced Edition, four new characters with new locations and quests tied to them, and a new standalone arena adventure, with the game made available for all of the same platforms. Following its success, Overhaul Games also worked upon and released a remaster of Icewind Dale, entitled Icewind Dale: Enhanced Edition, which was released on October 30, 2014.

An expansion entitled Baldur's Gate: Siege of Dragonspear was released on March 31, 2016, featuring 25 – 30 hours of new content, and focusing on events that begin after the conclusion of Baldur's Gate, but before the start of Baldur's Gate II.
