= Icewind Dale (series) =

Video game series

- Genre: Role-playing
- Developers: Black Isle Studios; Overhaul Games
- Publishers: Interplay Entertainment; Beamdog; Atari
- Platforms: Microsoft Windows, Macintosh, Linux, Mac OS X, Nintendo Switch, Android, iOS, PlayStation 4, Xbox One
- First release: Icewind Dale; June 29, 2000
- Latest release: Icewind Dale: Enhanced Edition; October 30, 2014

Icewind Dale is a role-playing video game series developed by Black Isle Studios. It is set in the Forgotten Realms Icewind Dale region, but takes place decades before the events described in R. A. Salvatore's books which made the area a part of Faerûn.

The games use BioWare's Infinity Engine, which offers a pre-rendered worldview, with sprite-based characters. This engine was also used to power the Baldur's Gate series and Planescape: Torment.

The player begins each of the games by generating a party of up to six characters, but is unable to recruit non-player characters (as was possible in other games using the Infinity Engine). Also, as the entire party is generated by the player, the player-characters do not have preset personalities, and are all equally capable of assuming the role of "protagonist" with minor differences at most.

In 2000, Icewind Dale was released to mostly positive reviews, although the game drew some criticism for its linearity and lack of character development when it came to the player's party. The game features far more hack-and-slash than Baldur's Gate, and has often been compared to the Diablo series of games for its combat-heavy focus.

== Icewind Dale ==
The gameplay of Icewind Dale is similar to that of Baldur's Gate. As with Baldur's Gate, the game is based on the Advanced Dungeons & Dragons 2nd edition ruleset, and the combat system is a quasi-real-time adaptation of the normally turn-based Dungeons & Dragons combat system used. Dice rolling and the like are all done automatically, without requiring the player's participation, although it is possible to pause the game at any time to issue orders to the party.

One of the most noticeable differences compared to Baldur's Gate is the much larger bestiary: ettins, orcs, goblins, and orogs, for example, are all major foes in this game, whereas they were not present in the original Baldur's Gate. Some other differences include: the raised experience level-cap; bigger battles, sometimes involving 20 or more foes at once; and far larger spell selection - used by or against the player's party. 6th level spells and above make frequent appearances throughout the game.

Also unlike Baldur's Gate, the game makes use of a semi-random item generation system. In Baldur's Gate most items were pre-placed - meaning that the same items were in the same places every time the game was played. In Icewind Dale, however, most quest-earned items are randomly picked out of a handful of pre-generated ones, and items taken from the corpses of foes are similar in that regard, although slightly more random.

Icewind Dale was received by mostly positive reviews. Most critics cited the game's musical score and fast pacing as high-points, although others faulted the game for its time-consuming character creation and numerous bugs.

=== Expansions ===
Icewind Dale: Heart of Winter is an expansion pack to Icewind Dale that introduced many changes and additions to the original game. Some notable changes included such things as the addition of several types of classic Dungeons & Dragons enemies that were missing from the original (e.g., barrow wights), a much higher experience point cap, new magical items to find or purchase, a special "Heart of Fury" difficulty setting for increased enemy power and higher experience point-gain, and the ability to set the resolution higher than 640x480. The game is still based on the Advanced Dungeons & Dragons 2nd edition ruleset, but like Baldur's Gate II: Shadows of Amn, it included several changes (such as new spell progression tables) from the 3rd edition ruleset.

Another addition is the inclusion of several more areas to explore, although to access them, the player must enter a previously locked door in the town of Kuldahar while possessing a party of level 9 characters or above.

Although the game contained numerous changes that most felt were for the better, it was heavily criticised for the length of the campaign, which was much shorter than the original game's. Despite this, the game still achieved fairly positive reviews.

Trials of the Luremaster is a free, downloadable expansion pack to Icewind Dale: Heart of Winter. It was released by Black Isle Studios due to criticism that, on its own, Heart of Winter was too short. It contains several new areas to explore, and a handful of new enemies to fight.

== Icewind Dale II ==
Icewind Dale II is the sequel to Icewind Dale, which is based on the BioWare Infinity Engine, and incorporates nearly all of the changes and additions to the series made by the Heart of Winter and Trials of the Luremaster expansion packs. Unlike its predecessors, the game is based entirely on the Dungeons & Dragons 3rd edition ruleset, which brings such things to the series as feats, the ability for any race to be any class, and the ability for any class to use any weapon. As in Baldur's Gate II: Shadows of Amn, the 3rd edition character classes of Barbarian, Sorcerer, and Monk are present in the game, but unlike that game there are also many sub-races, such as Drow, and Tieflings, which all have racial advantages and disadvantages.

Another significant change is the increased bestiary, which now includes such creatures as bugbears, hook horrors, and driders, as well as many returning monsters from the previous Icewind Dale game and its expansion packs, the Baldur's Gate series, and Planescape: Torment. In addition, a much larger section of Icewind Dale is explorable than in the previous games.

The game was praised by many critics for its pacing, music, numerous improvements over the original game and its expansions, although most found fault with the game's graphics, which consisted of sprite characters and 2d prerendered backgrounds, and were considerably less impressive than those of other CRPGs released that year, such as Neverwinter Nights and The Elder Scrolls III: Morrowind. Regardless, Icewind Dale II achieved mostly positive reviews.

== Further releases ==
Upon the announcement of Baldur's Gate: Enhanced Edition by Atari, Beamdog and Overhaul Games, many fans of the Icewind Dale series took to Twitter to request Overhaul Games make an Enhanced Edition of Icewind Dale. Trent Oster replied that they are interested but any future products would depend on the pending success of Baldur's Gate: Enhanced Edition. Oster went on to say that an Enhanced Edition of Icewind Dale would use the codebase of Baldur's Gate II: Throne of Bhaal to implement new classes and kits as well as updates to the Dungeons & Dragons system. The enhanced edition of the game was released on October 30, 2014.
