= Baldur's Gate =

Fantasy role-playing video game franchise

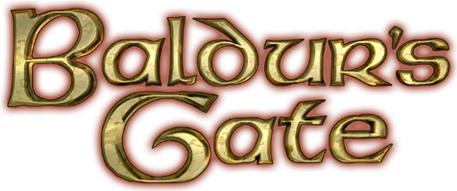
- Genre: Role-playing video game
- Developers: BioWare; Snowblind Studios; Magic Pockets; Black Isle Studios; High Voltage Software; Beamdog; Larian Studios
- Publishers: Black Isle Studios; Interplay Entertainment; Destination Software; Atari; Beamdog; Larian Studios
- Platforms: Windows; PlayStation 2; PlayStation 4; PlayStation 5; Xbox; Xbox One; Xbox Series X/S; GameCube; Game Boy Advance; macOS; Linux; Switch; iOS; Android; Stadia
- First release: Baldur's Gate; December 21, 1998
- Latest release: Baldur's Gate 3 August 3, 2023

Baldur's Gate is a series of role-playing video games set in the Forgotten Realms Dungeons & Dragons campaign setting. The series has been divided into two sub-series, known as the Bhaalspawn Saga and the Dark Alliance, both taking place mostly within the Western Heartlands, but the Bhaalspawn Saga extends to Amn and Tethyr. The Dark Alliance series was released for consoles and was critically and commercially successful. The Bhaalspawn Saga was critically acclaimed for using pausable real-time gameplay, which is credited with revitalizing the computer role-playing game (CRPG) genre.

The Bhaalspawn Saga was originally developed by BioWare for personal computers. Beamdog and its division Overhaul Games developed remakes of the original games in HD. The Dark Alliance series was originally set to be developed by Snowblind Studios, but ports were handled by Black Isle Studios, High Voltage Software, and Magic Pockets, with the second game developed by Black Isle.

Black Isle Studios had planned a third series to be set in the Dalelands and be a PC-exclusive hack and slash game with pausable real-time gameplay. The game would not have been connected to the Bhaalspawn Saga series. The game was cancelled when Interplay forfeited the D&D PC license to Atari.

The series was revived in 2012 with Baldur's Gate: Enhanced Edition, an update of the original Baldur's Gate using an enhanced Infinity Engine. The release of the Enhanced Edition marked the first release in the series in eight years, and was followed by a revival of the second Baldur's Gate called Baldur's Gate II: Enhanced Edition. Beamdog was granted permission to develop new games with the license, such as Baldur's Gate: Siege of Dragonspear, an expansion for Baldur's Gate: Enhanced Edition. The license was later given to Larian Studios, who developed and published Baldur's Gate 3, released in 2023.

== Games ==
Title	Release	Platforms	Notes
Baldur's Gate	December 21, 1998	Windows, Mac OS	Developed by BioWare
Baldur's Gate: Tales of the Sword Coast	April 30, 1999	Windows, Mac OS	Expansion, developed by BioWare
Baldur's Gate II: Shadows of Amn	September 21, 2000	Windows, Mac OS	Developed by BioWare
Baldur's Gate II: Throne of Bhaal	June 22, 2001	Windows, Mac OS	Expansion, developed by BioWare
Baldur's Gate: Dark Alliance	December 4, 2001	PS2, Xbox, GameCube, GBA, Windows, Mac OS, Linux, PS4, PS5, Xbox One, Xbox Series X/S, Switch, iOS	Spin-off, originally developed by Snowblind Studios
Baldur's Gate: Dark Alliance II	January 20, 2004	PS2, Xbox, Windows, Mac OS, Linux, PS4, PS5, Xbox One, Xbox Series X/S, Switch	Spin-off, developed by Black Isle Studios
Baldur's Gate: Enhanced Edition	November 28, 2012	Windows, Mac OS, Linux, PS4, Xbox One, Switch, iOS, Android	Enhanced Edition, developed by Overhaul Games
Baldur's Gate II: Enhanced Edition	November 15, 2013	Windows, Mac OS, Linux, PS4, Xbox One, Switch, iOS, Android	Enhanced Edition, developed by Overhaul Games
Baldur's Gate: Siege of Dragonspear	March 31, 2016	Windows, Mac OS, Linux, PS4, Xbox One, Switch, iOS	Expansion, developed by Beamdog
Baldur's Gate 3	August 3, 2023 (Note: An early access version of Baldur's Gate 3 for Microsoft Windows and macOS was released on October 6, 2020.)	Windows, Mac OS, Linux, PS5, Xbox Series X/S	Developed by Larian Studios

The Baldur's Gate series brought technical advancements over role-playing video games of the past. BioWare's Infinity Engine offers a pre-rendered isometric worldview, with sprite-based characters. Baldur's Gate was the third computer game to make use of the Lua scripting language. The engine was used for Planescape: Torment and the Icewind Dale series.

The earliest released in the series are based on a real-time modification of the second edition AD&D (Advanced Dungeons & Dragons) ruleset. The player's party can have up to six members, either created by the player according to the AD&D rules or non-player characters (NPCs) recruited by the protagonist from the game world.

Baldur's Gate 3 is based on Dungeons & Dragons 5th Edition, and the party is limited to 4 characters.

Numerous side quests and plot twists are associated with particular NPCs and can be activated if they are found in the player's party. Through extensive, context-dependent dialogue, many characters inside and outside the player's party are fleshed out and given an added level of complexity.

In 2004, Sorrent published a Baldur's Gate mobile game for J2ME.

=== Original series ===
The first game in the series was Baldur's Gate and introduces the player character as an orphan who has been raised by the sage Gorion in the fortified library-monastery of Candlekeep, south of Baldur's Gate and north of the kingdom of Amn. After an urgent departure from Candlekeep and a violent separation from their foster father, the protagonist searches for Gorion's allies and becomes involved with solving the region's iron crisis which has been mysteriously causing all metal to crumble, while avoiding or battling increasingly powerful enemies who have been tasked with taking their life. An expansion pack for Baldur's Gate called Tales of the Sword Coast did not add to the primary storyline, but presented the protagonist with more areas to explore along the Sword Coast, more powerful enemies, more spells, and better equipment. It also allows the player character to reach higher levels of experience, made some general changes to gameplay, and altered the original game's final battle.

The sequel to Baldur's Gate was Baldur's Gate II: Shadows of Amn. The main character is captured by Jon Irenicus and must escape into the city of Athkatla, the capital of Amn. Here the protagonist faces several different ways to figure out the reason behind the capture, as they journey through the region of Amn and the Underdark. The game presents a number of innovations over the first Baldur's Gate game, including further specialization of character classes, better graphics, and higher power levels. It also allowed more interaction with the game's joinable NPCs, including friendships, romances, and your own party members' interactions with one another. Throne of Bhaal is an expansion pack for Baldur's Gate II: Shadows of Amn, and includes both an expansion of the original game, such as new areas to explore, and a conclusion to the Bhaalspawn story arc started in the first Baldur's Gate game.

The third main title, Baldur's Gate 3, was developed by Larian Studios in partnership with Wizards of the Coast, which holds the license for the Dungeons & Dragons IP. It was released in 2023 for Windows PC, Mac OS, PS5, Xbox Series X/S.

=== Dark Alliance ===
The action role-playing game Baldur's Gate: Dark Alliance was developed by Snowblind Studios and others, and released in 2001 for the PlayStation 2 console, and later Xbox and GameCube video game consoles. The game takes place in the city of Baldur's Gate and surrounding area and is set in the Forgotten Realms setting, with a ruleset derived from the 3rd edition of Dungeon & Dragons; the plot is unrelated to previous PC games. The console version used an overhead third person view, and hack-and-slash dungeon crawl style gameplay. A Game Boy Advance version was released in 2004, with reduced graphics quality using an 2.5D isometric type perspective. While all ports were very well received, the original for the PlayStation 2 was the only one that gained universal acclaim.

A sequel, Baldur's Gate: Dark Alliance II was developed by Black Isle Studios and released in 2004 for the PlayStation 2 and Xbox; the game used the same gameplay style as the original, and was also positively reviewed. The gameplay style was expanded to make the game more like a role-playing game, the ability to craft weapons, armor and amulets was added, Baldur's Gate became a hub city with the addition of a world map and being able to travel back to areas, making the game open world and many more side-quests were added as well as the ability to level up one's class.

Interplay Entertainment placed its entire catalogue of video game intellectual properties (IP) and assets up for sale, including that of Dark Alliance in 2016.

=== Enhanced editions ===
The original game was remade in 2012 by Overhaul Games and Beamdog, 14 years after the release of the original game. It was re-released on multiple platforms as Baldur's Gate: Enhanced Edition, a collection of the original game and its expansion Tales of the Sword Coast. A brand new expansion named Baldur's Gate: Siege of Dragonspear was released in 2016.

Baldur's Gate II: Enhanced Edition, a remake of the second game, was released in 2013. It was developed by Overhaul Games for PC, Mac OS X, iOS, Linux and Android, featuring a modified version of the Infinity Engine. The game features new content and widescreen compatibility, and utilized 2nd Edition D&D rules. Beamdog also made enhanced versions of other Infinity Engine games, including Icewind Dale, Planescape: Torment and Neverwinter Nights.

The enhanced versions were released for Nintendo Switch, PlayStation 4, and Xbox One in 2019.

== Cancelled games ==
=== Baldur's Gate III: The Black Hound ===
Baldur's Gate III: The Black Hound (code named Jefferson and FR6) was mentioned in early 2001 as a new game in the Baldur's Gate series to be made by Black Isle Studios using a new 3D engine. The game was originally announced in 2002 and was said to have used the 3rd Edition Dungeons & Dragons ruleset. Many new gameplay features were also going to be added to fit the 3rd Edition Ruleset better, and elements from the Dark Alliance series would have also been borrowed. The game used the Jefferson Engine which featured 3D effects such as casting dynamic shadows.

The Black Hound was originally going to be a departure from the high-powered epic of the Bhaalspawn saga to a low-key, role-playing plot. With protagonists progressing to around level four at the end of Black Isle Studios' typically large campaign and a hard cap at level eight, gameplay was refocussed to adventure, with emphasizing quests over combat. The game was only titled Baldur's Gate due to Interplay having lost the general D&D license to Atari, but still retaining the right to make Baldur's Gate and Icewind Dale branded D&D games (the same reason as for Baldur's Gate: Dark Alliance's title). The game was not going to be connected to the previous Baldur's Gate series in any way and would start a new series, the Black Hound series. It was to be a sequel in terms of gameplay and not story, although it would have continued some aspects of the Icewind Dale II story.

Development on Baldur's Gate III: The Black Hound was cancelled in 2003 and the third game in the Dark Alliance series was also cancelled in 2004 when Black Isle Studios was closed in the same year by parent company Interplay Entertainment Corp. The engine for The Black Hound was re-purposed for the development of the similarly ill-fated Van Buren project, the working title for the eventual Fallout 3. The game was 75% finished before it was canceled. Its cancellation happened due to Interplay losing the right to publish Baldur's Gate games on the PC yet retaining the Baldur's Gate name for consoles; the result of this was Baldur's Gate: Dark Alliance II.

In an interview with Winterwind Productions, Black Hound developer Damien Foletto revealed the story and setting of the game, which would have been in the Dalelands. The player character would have been resting at their campsite when a woman chasing a Black Hound crashes in; she kills the hound, which dies on the player character 's lap. Accusing the player character of being in league with the dog, she is about to kill the player character as well, but the Riders of Archendale arrive and scare her off before questioning the player character. After a brief inquisition, the local magistrates tell the player character not to wander far because they may have more questions. The player's quest would involve finding out who the mad cleric was, what this has to do with them, why a black spirit hound follows them around, and why people can not leave the player character alone and do things for themselves instead.

Atari stated in December 2008 in a press conference that the Baldur's Gate series (among others) would be revisited after 2009. As a personal side project, Sawyer continued work on The Black Hound as a module for Neverwinter Nights 2 for a time.

=== Baldur's Gate 3 by Overhaul Games ===
After finishing the Enhanced Editions of Baldur's Gate and Baldur's Gate II, Overhaul Games said that development of Baldur's Gate 3 would be "a long-term goal" with funding possibly from Kickstarter. The studio later clarified their Baldur's Gate game would be a separate game from The Black Hound. Game developer Trent Oster suggested Thay and Waterdeep as possible settings for the game. Beamdog began calling the game Baldur's Gate Next as a way to differentiate it from the Bhaalspawn Saga.

Overhaul Games and Beamdog eventually lost the rights to develop further Baldur's Gate games and the license was later acquired by Larian Studios, the Belgian developer behind the Divinity: Original Sin series. Their project, Baldur's Gate 3, was unveiled in 2019 and released four years later.

== Characters ==
The Baldur's Gate series features a wide array of characters. Some characters can be recruited by the player as party members and accompany the player character in their adventures. Other major characters influence the plot of the game but are not playable characters, serving as either antagonists or supporting characters in their interactions with the player character. The player character for the main series is fully customizable, whereas the Dark Alliance sub-series feature a choice of defined characters for the player to choose from.

The following list are a selection of characters from across the Baldur's Gate series.

- Allessia Faithhammer is one of the player characters of Baldur's Gate: Dark Alliance II. She is a Cleric of Helm, the god of guardians, protection and protectors. She travels to Baldur's Gate during the events of Dark Alliance II after hearing of the troubles in the city. PC Gamer likened her to a medieval version of RoboCop, a "do-gooder bound to protect the innocent and serving the public", and who "has a neat range of magical attacks at her disposal".
- Anomen Delryn is a warrior priest of Helm, and an acolyte of the Most Noble Order of the Radiant Heart. Deeply insecure due to his father's treatment of him, Anomen presents himself as a vain and arrogant character, frequently bragging about battles he most likely never fought. He is a potential companion, as well as love interest in Shadows of Amn if the player character is female. Depending on the player's actions, he may succeed or fail at his knighthood quest to ascend as a full member of his Order, the outcome of which changes his personality and in-game alignment. David Gaider noted that Anomen's romance subplot was his first attempt as a writer employed by Bioware.
- Edwin Odesseiron is a haughty member of the Red Wizards of Thay who seeks the player character's cooperation to kill a potential companion, the witch Dynaheir, and will join the party if the player character agrees to help him. He may also be recruited in Shadows of Amn, where he may be encountered as an agent employed by the Shadow Thieves of Amn. Progressing Edwin's personal side quest to pursue the Nether Scrolls will result in him changing sex after he attempts to invoke the scroll's power.
- Imoen is the player character's childhood friend and fellow ward of their foster father Gorion, living in Candlekeep where they were raised. She is a loyal companion throughout the original Baldur's Gate series, and her skills as an expert thief may be put to use throughout the series. Childlike and naive by nature, she is forced to endure a series of traumatic experiences during Shadows of Amn; she is tortured along with the rest of her companions, and is later arrested and incarcerated by an organisation of magic-users known as the Cowled Wizards for unlicensed magic use. Imoen's popularity with the Baldur Gate series fandom was not anticipated by Bioware; the original purpose of her inclusion in Baldur's Gate was to "fill a non-psychotic-thief gap in the early levels" late in the development cycle.
- Jaheira is a half-elf warrior druid and member of the Harpers, a semi-secret organization dedicated to promoting good and maintaining a balance between civilization and nature. Gorion leaves instructions for the player character to meet her and her husband Khalid after he is killed, although it is optional to recruit the couple into the party. Jaheira is available as a companion in the beginning of Shadows of Amn, and is revealed to be widowed soon afterwards. She is a potential love interest for a male player character if certain conditions are met; Gaider noted the romantic subplot itself was lengthy in terms of content, but riddled with bugs. Jaheira is one of the most popular and well-regarded characters in the Baldur's Gate series.
- Jon Irenicus is the chief antagonist of Shadows of Amn. He is a cold and calculating mage who was first encountered torturing the player character with powerful magic, as part of his experiments in order to divulge the mysteries of their divine ancestry. Originally an elf known as "Joneleth", he was exiled from his home city of Suldanessellar by its ruler Queen Ellesime as a result of his hubris to attain godhood.
- Khalid is an effete half-elf fighter, member of the Harpers and husband of Jaheira. He is a nervous, peace-loving warrior with a pronounced stutter. Khalid, like certain other companions, comes with Jaheira as an inseparable pair; if one leaves or is removed the party, the other will follow suit. Khalid is murdered by Irenicus in Shadows of Amn, widowing Jaheira and leaving her with survivor's guilt.
- Korgan Bloodaxe is an evil-aligned dwarven berserker, who could be found at the Copper Coronet Inn. He is highly rated as a worthy companion, not only for his combat skills which would prove invaluable for an evil-aligned party, but also for the quality of the banter between him and any good-aligned characters in the party.
- Minsc is a berserker ranger from the human nation of Rashemen, with a strong though somewhat unhinged desire to uphold good and be heroic. His animal companion is a hamster named Boo, who he believes is a "miniature giant space hamster" and consults for advice. Minsc is originally tasked with serving as a bodyguard to the Rashemi witch Dynaheir as part of his rite of passage, and is inseparable from her once she is rescued. He is a potentially recruitable companion throughout the original Baldur's Gate series, outliving Dynaheir, who is murdered by Irenicus prior to the events of Shadows of Amn.
- Sarevok is the chief antagonist of Baldur’s Gate, and as a mortal spawn of the dead God of Murder Bhaal, the half-brother of the player character. As a child he was the would-be victim of a sacrificial ritual which was stopped by Gorion and the Harpers, and was later adopted by Rieltar Anchev, leader of the Iron Throne. Sarevok's foster father is a central figure in fomenting the iron crisis in Baldur's Gate to gain power for the Iron Throne, as well as the doppelganger infiltration of merchant rivals. His goal is to take advantage of the ensuring chaos orchestrated by the Iron Throne to kill his fellow Bhaalspawn and ascend into divinity himself. Sarevok reappears in Throne of Bhaal where the player character may restore him to life and recruit him as a party member.
- Vahn is one of the player characters of Baldur's Gate: Dark Alliance. He is an Arcane Archer, known for their ability to shoot arrows with unerring accuracy, often with additional magical effects. Being in the wrong place at the wrong time, Vahn quickly finds himself mired in the political and social upheaval of the city of Baldur's Gate, and up against the Dark Alliance led by Eldrith the Betrayer, the main antagonist of Dark Alliance.
- Viconia DeVir is a drow outcast and Cleric of Shar, the goddess of darkness, night, and loss. She is a recruitable companion throughout the original Baldur's Gate series, and a potential love interest for a male player character in Shadows of Amn, embodying the femme fatale archetype.

In addition, a number of major Forgotten Realms characters make guest appearances throughout the Baldur's Gate series, such as Drizzt Do'Urden, Elminster, and Volothamp Geddarm.

== Adaptations ==
=== Novels ===
Philip Athans, editor of the Forgotten Realms novel line, wrote the first two novels in the Baldur's Gate trilogy of novels: Baldur's Gate and Baldur's Gate II: Shadows of Amn, both are novelizations of the video game series' storylines. The novels follow the basic outline of the original stories, but eschew several of the games' numerous subplots and include only a few of the NPCs. The Bhaalspawn main character is named Abdel Adrian in the novels. The third novel, Baldur's Gate II: Throne of Bhaal, was authored by Drew Karpyshyn.

- Athans, Philip (June 1999). Baldur's Gate: A Novelization. Wizards of the Coast. ISBN 978-0-7869-1525-5.
- Athans, Philip (September 2000). Baldur's Gate II: Shadows of Amn. Wizards of the Coast. ISBN 978-0-7869-1569-9.
- Karpyshyn, Drew (September 2001). Baldur's Gate II: Throne of Bhaal. Wizards of the Coast. ISBN 978-0-7869-1985-7.

The novel Baldur's Gate 3: Astarion by T. Kingfisher (ISBN 9798217298594) is scheduled for release in September 2026.

=== Comics ===
A comic titled Dungeons & Dragons: Legends of Baldur's Gate was released in October 2014. The comic is set generations after Throne of Bhaal, and features Minsc as the main character. It is written by Jim Zub and pencilled by Max Dunbar, part of the Dungeons & Dragons 40th anniversary celebrations.

=== TV series ===
In February 2026, it was announced that HBO and Hasbro Entertainment were developing a television series adaptation of Baldur's Gate. The series, set to be showrun, written, and executive produced by Craig Mazin, is set after the events of Baldur's Gate 3. According to video game journalist Geoff Keighley, developer Larian Studios have no involvement in the adaptation.

== Reception and legacy ==
Aggregate review scores As of November 29, 2023.
Game	Metacritic
Baldur's Gate	91/100
Baldur's Gate: Tales of the Sword Coast	–
Baldur's Gate II: Shadows of Amn	95/100
Baldur's Gate II: Throne of Bhaal	88/100
Baldur's Gate: Dark Alliance	(PS2) 87/100 (Xbox) 83/100 (GC) 79/100 (GBA) 76/100
Baldur's Gate: Dark Alliance II	(PS2) 78/100 (Xbox) 77/100
Baldur's Gate: Enhanced Edition	(PC) 78/100 (iOS) 73/100
Baldur's Gate II: Enhanced Edition	(PC) 78/100 (iOS) 70/100
Baldur's Gate: Siege of Dragonspear	(PC) 77/100
Baldur's Gate 3	96/100

In 1999, Baldur's Gate won the Origins Award for Best Role Playing Game Computer Game of 1998, and in 2000, Baldur's Gate: Tales of the Sword Coast won Best Role Game Playing Game Computer Game of 1999. The Academy of Interactive Arts & Sciences awarded the original Baldur's Gate the Interactive Achievement Award for PC Role-Playing Game of the Year. Baldur's Gate II: Throne of Bhaal and Baldur's Gate: Dark Alliance also would later win Interactive Achievement Awards for Role-Playing Game of the Year for its respective PC and Console categories for the release year of 2001. Dark Alliance II won the 2004 RPG of the Year Award by GameFan, and was later inducted into the GameFan Hall of Fame. By June 2001, the series sold more than 3.5 million units worldwide.

PC Gamer's Paul Dean noted that the series "has always been as much about who these characters were as what they could do". He considered Baldur's Gate's characters as the cornerstone of the series, and that some of them were the best RPG companions ever written.

Baldur's Gate 3 received universal acclaim, and won several Game of the Year awards including from the Golden Joystick Awards, the Game Awards, the D.I.C.E. Awards, the Game Developers Choice Awards, and the British Academy Games Awards.

== See also ==
- List of Dungeons & Dragons video games
