= Infinity Engine =

Video game software framework

- Screenshot of Planescape: Torment demonstrating the user interface and 2D isometric graphics representative of games using the Infinity Engine
- Developer: BioWare
- Initial release: 1998
- Written in: C++, Lua
- Operating system: Original editions: Windows, Mac OS, OS X Enhanced Editions: Windows, macOS, Linux, Android, iOS, Switch, PS4, XB1; GemRB: Windows, macOS, Linux (release builds; many more OSs via community builds)
- Type: Game engine
- License: Proprietary
- Website: gemrb.org (open-source recreation)

The Infinity Engine is a game engine which allows the creation of isometric role-playing video games adapting the Dungeons & Dragons ruleset. It was originally developed by BioWare for a prototype real-time strategy game codenamed Battleground: Infinity, which was ultimately re-engineered to become 1998's Baldur's Gate. BioWare used it again in subsequent installments of the series and also licensed the engine to Interplay's Black Isle Studios to create the Icewind Dale series and Planescape: Torment. The engine would serve as the cancelled Battleground: Infinity's namesake.

== History ==
The Infinity Engine was conceived by BioWare as the foundation for a real-time strategy game, then-titled Battleground: Infinity, which eventually evolved into the first Baldur's Gate, a computer role-playing game.

The graphical engine was specifically optimized for computer role-playing games. It relies on unified huge pre-rendered 2D scrolling backgrounds, with both characters and objects represented by sprites. OpenGL acceleration for enhanced effects was added with Baldur's Gate II.

In December 2002, following the release of BG2, Ray Muzyka announced a high-resolution patch for BioWare's games that enabled the Infinity Engine to support resolutions higher than 800×600 pixels. The last original game to use the Infinity Engine was Icewind Dale II, released in 2002, unique for adapting the newer D&D 3e instead of 2e.

The Aurora Engine is regarded as the spiritual successor to the Infinity Engine. BioWare would use it to create Neverwinter Nights (2002) and its expansions. The Polish studio CD Projekt Red also employed the Aurora Engine to develop The Witcher, the 2007 video game adaptation of the Polish novel series by Andrzej Sapkowski, although the rendering module was rewritten from scratch.

Players independently wrote GemRB, a game engine recreation of Infinity that is open source and multiplatform. After development started in 2000, it first achieved completability of a game (BG2) in 2009, and of all games by 2024.

From 2012 to 2017, Infinity was modernized for remasters by Beamdog of all games (except IWD2, due to the loss of its source code), as well as for a new expansion to BG1, Siege of Dragonspear.

== List of games using Infinity Engine ==
The following games and expansions are powered by the Infinity Engine:

- Baldur's Gate (1998)
  - Baldur's Gate: Tales of the Sword Coast (1999)
- Planescape: Torment (1999)
- Icewind Dale (2000)
  - Icewind Dale: Heart of Winter (2001)
  - Icewind Dale: Heart of Winter: Trials of the Luremaster (2001)
- Baldur's Gate II: Shadows of Amn (2000)
  - Baldur's Gate II: Throne of Bhaal (2001)
- Icewind Dale II (2002)
- Baldur's Gate: Enhanced Edition (2012)
  - Baldur's Gate: Enhanced Edition: Siege of Dragonspear (2016)
- Baldur's Gate II: Enhanced Edition (2013)
- Icewind Dale: Enhanced Edition (2014)
- Planescape: Torment: Enhanced Edition (2017)

== See also ==
- Odyssey Engine
