= Icewind Dale: Enhanced Edition =

2014 video game

- Developer: Overhaul Games
- Publishers: Atari; Beamdog; Skybound Games (consoles)
- Director: Alex Tomovic
- Producer: Phillip Daigle
- Programmer: Scott Brooks
- Artist: Nat Jones
- Series: Icewind Dale
- Engine: Infinity Engine
- Platforms: Microsoft Windows, Mac OS X, Linux, iOS, Android, Nintendo Switch, PlayStation 4, Xbox One
- Release: Windows, OS X, Linux, iOS, Android; October 30, 2014; Nintendo Switch, PlayStation 4, Xbox One; October 15, 2019
- Genre: Role-playing
- Modes: Single-player, multiplayer

Icewind Dale: Enhanced Edition is a remake of the Black Isle Studios' 2000 role-playing video game Icewind Dale and its expansions Icewind Dale: Heart of Winter and Trials of the Luremaster. Enhanced Edition was developed by Overhaul Games, a division of Beamdog, and published by Atari for Microsoft Windows, Mac OS X, Linux, iOS, and Android.

== Gameplay ==
The game allows for an updated multiplayer feature, including cross platform, letting players play together regardless of the platform they play on. Much like Baldur's Gate: Enhanced Edition, Icewind Dale: Enhanced Edition features a revamped user interface and a new renderer. To enhance gameplay several different viewing modes are available, as well as touch commands for mobile editions. The enhancements include 60 new items and 30 class/kit combinations and the playable blackguard class, a feature first presented in Baldur's Gate II: Enhanced Edition.

== Development ==
An enhanced edition of Icewind Dale was announced at the end of August 2014. It was to feature new content, widescreen compatibility, and continue to use 2nd Edition D&D rules. Due to its similarity in programming with the original Baldur's Gate, Icewind Dale was pitched by Beamdog's Overhaul Games to Wizards of the Coast to receive an enhanced edition. With the intent of announcing the game only a month prior to release, this was later changed, forcing the team to reveal it at the Penny Arcade Expo. The game was developed through use of an updated Infinity Engine, referred to as either the Infinity Enhanced Engine, Infinity Plus Engine, or the Infinity Bless Engine.

Although most of the assets of the original Icewind Dale were retrieved, the original programming done by Black Isle Studios was dumped. Instead, coding used in Baldur's Gate II: Enhanced Edition was utilized. New code was then created by Overhaul to replace lost programming from the expansion Icewind Dale: Heart of Winter. While most of the code for Heart of Winter was rewritten, the majority of the original game's assets remained.

== Release ==
The game was available for pre-order on the Beamdog website. The game was released on October 30, 2014 for Windows, OS X and Linux computers through GOG.com, Steam and Beamdog's official website. The game was also released for Android on the same day of PC release. The iOS devices release was delayed to November 11 as Apple did not originally approve of placing it in the iOS App Store, citing partial nudity in the game's CGI intro.

Skybound Games, a division of Skybound Entertainment, released Beamdog's remastered version to Nintendo Switch, PlayStation 4, and Xbox One on October 15, 2019.

== Reception ==
Reception

Aggregate score
Aggregator	Score
Metacritic	PC: 80/100 iOS: 83/100

Review scores
Publication	Score
Gamezebo	3.5/5
MeriStation	8.2/10
PC Gamer (US)	74/100
TouchArcade	5/5
Gameplanet	9/10
IGN Italia	8.1/10
Multiplayer.it	8/10
Softpedia	8/10

Icewind Dale: Enhanced Edition received mostly positive reviews from critics. The PC version has a score of 80/100 on Metacritic based on 13 reviews while the iOS version has a score of 83/100 based on 4 reviews.

Gameplanet gave it a review score of 9/10 praising it for graphic upgrade over the original, bug fixes, rule tweaks and adding in all the additional content of the game while criticizing it for its dated graphics and the unnecessary inclusion of the "Story Mode" difficulty level. Gamezebo gave the mobile version a review score of 3.5/5 praising it for its new features, being free of lags and glitches and having a customizable UI. At the same time it criticized it for being difficult towards newcomers and being hard to play on a touchscreen. PC Gamer gave it a review score of 74/100 calling it "a cool must-play for RPG fans who’ve not tried it before, and a warming flashback for those who have". Softpedia gave it a review score of 8/10 praising it for its replay value, vast world, adding new UI and other features and for adding all its additional content and never-before-seen content. At the same time it also criticized it for not showing much graphic improvement over the original, being too difficult for new players and having no Dungeons & Dragons ruleset system tutorial.

Josh Sawyer, one of the designers of the original game, commented on the Enhanced Edition in an interview: "As one of the main designers on Icewind Dale, seeing the BG2 [Baldur's Gate II] kits in there destroy all the balance kind of made me a little sad. The BG2 kits are really powerful and Icewind Dale was kind of balanced around one thing. But it was still really cool to see it with all the tech upgrades".
