= Icewind Dale: Heart of Winter =

- Developer: Black Isle Studios
- Publisher: Interplay Entertainment
- Producers: Chris Parker; Darren Monahan
- Designers: J.E. Sawyer; Steve Bokkes; John Deiley; Chris Avellone
- Programmer: Bernie Weir
- Artist: Pete Meihuizen
- Composer: Jeremy Soule
- Series: Icewind Dale
- Engine: Infinity Engine
- Platform: Microsoft Windows
- Release: NA: February 20, 2001; EU: March 23, 2001
- Genre: Role-playing
- Modes: Single-player, multiplayer

Icewind Dale: Heart of Winter is a 2001 expansion pack to the role-playing video game Icewind Dale, developed by Black Isle Studios and published by Interplay Entertainment. It introduced many changes and additions to the original game, and included a new campaign. A downloadable add-on to this expansion pack, titled Trials of the Luremaster, was released for free. Both the expansion and add-on were included in Icewind Dale: Enhanced Edition.

== Gameplay ==
Some notable changes include a much higher experience point cap, new magical items and spells, a special "Heart of Fury" difficulty setting for increased enemy power and higher experience point-gain, and a maximum resolution of 800x600. The game is still based on the Advanced Dungeons & Dragons 2nd edition ruleset.

In order to access the new campaign, the player must either enter a previously locked door in the town of Kuldahar while possessing a party of characters level 9 or above or import the party after completing the main campaign, when the party is exported.

== Plot ==
In Kuldahar, the player's characters are greeted by a barbarian shaman, Hjollder, who reveals that he has visions of a great conflict and that the party is the key to stopping it. The party is magically transported to Lonelywood, where they discover that a great barbarian force is gathering nearby, threatening to destroy the Ten Towns. The force has rallied to Wylfdene, a great barbarian warlord killed in battle the previous season. He claims to be host to the spirit of the ancient barbarian hero Jerrod and is now eager to strike the Ten Towns in the name of the war-god Tempus.

The party journeys to the barbarian camp and meets the resurrected chief himself. Hjollder believes that something is off with Wylfdene, and is in turn exiled from the camp. The party later finds the exiled Hjollder in the barbarian burial grounds Wylfdene rose from, though it is now plagued by undead and spirits. On his recommendation, the party journeys to the Gloomfrost to consult the Seer, an old woman with vast mystical powers. She reveals that it is not Jerrod who inhabits the body of Wylfdene, but rather the soul of great white dragon Icasaracht.

The party returns to the barbarian camp, where the Seer herself approaches Wylfdene. She is killed by him, but succeeds in tricking the dragon spirit into abandoning his body, revealing the deception to the gathered barbarians. The last task of the player's party is to journey to the Sea of Moving Ice where Icasaracht's Lair is located. There, they battle through her minions (including the remaining loyal barbarians, trolls and sahuagins) and ultimately find the white dragon herself. She explains she wished vengeance upon the Ten Towns for the seizure of dragonkind's lands, and for her death a century past.

She claims she saw a kindred spirit in Wylfdene and sympathized with the barbarians, who she claims face extinction from the encroaching Ten Towns. She had thought they would be fitting instruments for her plan. The party kills her, and shatters the Soul Stone that had saved her from death a century before, ensuring her death is final.

== Development ==
Icewind Dale: Heart of Winter was announced on September 25, 2000, shortly before the release of Baldur's Gate II: Shadows of Amn. By that time, the expansion had been in full production for between one and two months. Designer Josh Sawyer said that the impetus for the project was the strong retail performance of Icewind Dale; Interplay greenlit Heart of Winter around two weeks after the launch of the original game. The team began work "immediately", Sawyer wrote, as there was "a limited amount of time to work on the project and we needed to sharply define exactly what we wanted to accomplish."

Producer Darren Monahan said that the team "included a lot of fan feedback, particularly relating to the balances of each of the classes in the original game." Another focus lay on importing code and features created for Baldur's Gate II to the Icewind Dale series. One of the development challenges was the straightforward and linear structure of the original Icewind Dale, which left little room for additional content. The team's solution was to take players to a separate region by using the barbarian Hjollder as a "catalyst character", who could be met either in Icewind Dale's hub location of Kuldahar or after completing the game's main story. Team members John Deiley and Steve Bokkes handled the "majority of area and quest work" in Heart of Winter, according to Sawyer.

Heart of Winter went gold on February 12, 2001. It shipped to retailers on February 20. The expansion was released in Europe on March 23, 2001.

== Reception ==
Reception

Aggregate scores
Aggregator	Score
GameRankings	75%
Metacritic	74/100

Review scores
Publication	Score
Computer Games Magazine	4/5
Computer Gaming World	3/5
GameSpot	5.7/10
PC Gamer (US)	75/100

Icewind Dale: Heart of Winter received fairly positive reviews, with multiple reviewers complimenting its new features and areas. According to GameSpy, the writer suggests that "when the entire Icewind Dale saga is available at bargain prices, this expansion marks a fun portion of the entire game".

Chris Glassel of the Dallas Morning News and Greg Kasavin of GameSpot criticized the game for the length of its campaign, which was much shorter than the original. Chris Chan of the New Straits Times called out a number of minor technical glitches, such as pathfinding problems and the occasional system lock up.

=== Sales ===
Heart of Winter debuted at #6 on NPD Intelect's computer game sales rankings for the February 18–24 period. It fell to 10th place in its second week, and climbed back to ninth in its third week. After four weeks, Heart of Winter was absent from NPD's top 10.

== Trials of the Luremaster ==
In March 2001, Black Isle Studios began development of Trials of the Luremaster, a free, downloadable add-on for Heart of Winter. According to designer Steve Bokkes, the add-on was planned as a small stopgap project to keep members of the Heart of Winter team occupied. Black Isle was working on several games at the time and could not yet commit to another full production. Another inspiration was the criticism that Heart of Winter had been too short. Journalist Mark Asher wrote that he "talked to Black Isle Director Feargus Urquhart ... and he mentioned that they felt like maybe they should have done a little more with the Icewind Dale: Heart of Winter expansion, so this expansion is their response."

The add-on was released in early July 2001, with a download size of 72 megabytes. It contains a large dungeon-like location with several new areas to explore, and a handful of new enemies to combat and items to find. It also acts as the game's final patch, fixing a number of bugs and bringing the game's version number up to v1.42.

Trials of the Luremaster received a positive review from Brett Todd of Games Domain, who wrote that it "represents some of the finest design seen over the breadth of the entire Infinity Engine series from Bioware and Black Isle", although he noted that some sections "do feel padded".

=== Plot ===
The player meets a mysterious halfling, Hobart Stubbletoes, who introduces himself in the Whistling Gallows Inn in Lonelywood. He seeks a party of stalwart heroes for a quest to a place of great wonder, with treasures beyond the imagination. Should the party accept, they will be transported to a new place, far from the icy terrain of the Ten Towns, finding themselves within the walls of a ruined castle in an unfamiliar land, the Anauroch desert. The Castle itself is a place where a mad spirit of a bard named Luremaster is constantly challenging adventurers with many traps and monsters. The only way out of the place is to defeat all monsters, avoid traps, find good loot if possible, and defeat the Luremaster.
