= Icewind Dale =

2000 video game

- Developer: Black Isle Studios (Note: Mac port developed by Contraband Entertainment.)
- Publisher: Interplay Entertainment (Note: Mac port published by MacPlay.)
- Director: Feargus Urquhart
- Producers: Chris Parker; Darren L. Monahan
- Designers: Steve Bokkes; Josh Sawyer; John Deily; Reginald Arnedo; Scott Warner; Chris Avellone
- Programmers: Jacob Devore; Thomas French; David Ray
- Artists: Timothy Donley; Brian Menze; Aaron Meyers
- Composer: Jeremy Soule
- Series: Icewind Dale
- Engine: Infinity Engine
- Platforms: Windows, Mac OS, Mac OS X
- Release: Microsoft Windows: NA: June 29, 2000; AU: July 7, 2000; EU: July 21, 2000; Mac OS, Mac OS X: NA: March 26, 2002
- Genre: Role-playing
- Modes: Single-player, multiplayer

Icewind Dale is a role-playing video game developed by Black Isle Studios and originally published by Interplay Entertainment for Windows in 2000 and by MacPlay for the Macintosh in 2002 (both the Classic Mac OS and OS X). The game takes place in the Dungeons & Dragons Forgotten Realms campaign setting and the region of Icewind Dale, and uses the 2nd edition ruleset. The story follows a different set of events than those of R. A. Salvatore's The Icewind Dale Trilogy novels: in the game, an adventuring party becomes enlisted as a caravan guard while in Icewind Dale, in the wake of strange events, and eventually discover a plot that threatens the Ten Towns of Icewind Dale and beyond.

Icewind Dale received positive reviews, being praised for its musical score and gameplay. It was a commercial success, with sales above 400,000 units worldwide by early 2001. An expansion, Icewind Dale: Heart of Winter, was released in 2001, and a sequel, Icewind Dale II, followed in 2002. A remake by Overhaul Games, entitled Icewind Dale: Enhanced Edition, was published for several platforms in 2014.

== Gameplay ==
Party in battle

Icewind Dale's gameplay operates on a similar basis to that of Baldur's Gate in that it incorporates a modified version of the Advanced Dungeons & Dragons 2nd edition ruleset in which the rules' intricacies are automatically computed; the game keeps track of statistics and controls dice rolling. It has a similar user interface with minor cosmetic changes, and focuses mainly on combat, often against large groups of enemies, with dialogue driving the main story. The player is able to order a character(s) to engage in movement, dialogue, combat, or other actions such as pickpocketing within each game location. Combat has a real-time as opposed to a turn-based system, though with the option of pausing at any time so the player can give the party orders which are carried out when the game is resumed. Like other D&D-based games developed and/or published by Black Isle, Icewind Dale employs a paper-doll style inventory system, the storyline is divided into chapters, and there is a journal system archiving quests and notable entries on specific story-related information from non-player characters.

Players begin the game by creating an adventuring party of up to six characters, either by creating new characters or importing those from a previous game. Each new character created requires the player to provide them with their name, gender, race, class, and alignment, and then determine their ability scores and weapon proficiencies. The class of a character affects what alignments are available to them, what weapons and combat styles they can use, and how proficient they can be in them. Characters designated as thieves require the player to allocate points to the various thieving skills, and spellcasters need a few 1st level spells selected for their spellbook and then one memorised for use at the start of the game. Once a party is created, characters earn experience points in the game through completing quests and defeating enemies, and level up upon earning enough. Leveling up will automatically increase a character's hit points, grants spellcasters access to more spell slots including higher levels of magic, sometimes allows additional weapon proficiencies, and allows thieves to improve their thieving abilities.

== Plot ==
In the town of Easthaven, a party of adventurers are met in the tavern by the town's leader, Hrothgar (voiced by Jim Cummings), who invites them to join him on an expedition to investigate the town of Kuldahar, after reports of strange happenings there. On the road to Kuldahar, the expedition is ambushed by frost giants, who cause an avalanche that blocks the path back to Easthaven. With only the adventurers surviving, they continue to Kuldahar and meet with Arundel (also voiced by Cummings), the village's archdruid, who explains that a mysterious evil force has been kidnapping villagers, causing abnormal weather patterns, provoking monsters, and reducing the magical warmth provided by the giant tree that towers over the village.

Asked for their help to discover the source of the evil, the adventurers begin by searching the Vale of Shadows, an area containing Kuldahar's crypts, due to rumours of undead creature sightings. They encounter a cursed barbarian spirit named Kresselack (Tony Jay) who tells them that the threat lies elsewhere. Reporting this back to the druid, Arundel instructs the group to retrieve an ancient scrying item called the Heartstone Gem so he may discover the source of the evil more quickly. After finding the gem was stolen from its original resting place within a temple, the party travel to the caverns of Dragon's Eye, finding a number of the missing villagers being held there by lizard men. They eventually find the gem being used by a powerful Marilith named Yxunomei (Tara Strong). After killing Yxunomei and retrieving the gem, the party return to find Kuldahar under attack by Orogs, and Arundel mortally wounded by a shapeshifter disguised as the archdruid, who taunts them before vanishing. The true Arundel advises the party to take the Heartstone to Larrel (Michael Bell) at the fortress of the Severed Hand, the only one capable of using it now, before dying from his wounds.

Arriving at the fortress, the party discover that Larrel is insane, and complete a task to help him regain his sanity. Using the gem, Larrel discovers the source of the evil to reside in the former dwarven city of Dorn's Deep. Fighting their way through the city, the group eventually come across the source of the evil – a priest named Brother Poquelin (John Kassir). Poquelin reveals himself to be a demon who was exiled from his home realm by his superiors, and that both he and Yxunomei maintained a vendetta against each other that was getting out of control. Predicting she would follow him to the material plane, the demon sought a base of operation in the region to form a military force that could crush her. While doing so, he stumbled upon the ancient artifact Crenshinibon, which he claims had been "calling" to him. Poquelin immediately used its power to help him amass an army to conquer the lands of Icewind Dale, until Yxunomei's activities around Kuldahar led to the formation of Hrothgar's expedition. Seeking to stop it, the demon had his frost giant minions crush the expedition, but did not count on the adventurers' survival being a problem until they recovered the Heartstone Gem, forcing him to eliminate Arundel. Despite the party having found someone else to use it, Poquelin had managed to build up his forces, which he soon sent to Easthaven.

After a brief battle with Poquelin, the party finds itself transported back to Easthaven, which is now in ruins. The adventurers free the surviving villagers, after which the local cleric of Tempus, Everard, informs them that Poquelin is going after Jerrod's Stone, a mystical object housed under the town's temple, which acts as a seal on a portal to the Nine Hells of Baator. Originally opened during a major historic battle between the combined might of the barbarian tribes and an army of a powerful mage, it was sealed shut by the sacrifice of the shaman Jerrod who led the barbarians in the conflict. Gaining entry into the demon's crystal tower that enveloped the temple, the group discover that Poquelin's true intention was to reopen the portal contained within the Stone, allowing him to conquer the North with an army of devils at his command. Although he successfully opens the portal, Everard, having shunned the tale of Jerrod's sacrifice until finally understanding what he did, throws himself into the portal and seals it off at the cost of his life. The party then fights Poquelin in his true form as the devil Belhifet and manages to defeat him, banishing him to the Nine Hells and escaping the tower as it collapses. In time, Easthaven recovers, and the town is reconstructed.

In a twist ending, it is revealed the game's narrator (David Ogden Stiers) was really Belhifet, who spent a century imprisoned thanks to the adventurers, and he will soon walk the Prime Material once more to seek his revenge. (See Baldur's Gate: Siege of Dragonspear.)

== Development ==
Icewind Dale is based on the BioWare Infinity Engine, featuring pre-rendered backgrounds and sprite-based characters displayed with an isometric camera perspective. This engine was used to power Black Isle Studios' previous games Planescape: Torment, Baldur's Gate, and others.

Icewind Dale was released in 2000 in North America on June 29, Australia on July 7, and Europe on July 21 for Windows by Interplay Entertainment. Developed by Contraband Entertainment and published by MacPlay, a port for Mac OS and Mac OS X was released on March 26, 2002.

== Reception ==
Reception

Aggregate scores
Aggregator	Score
GameRankings	86%
Metacritic	87/100

Review scores
Publication	Score
Computer Games Magazine	4/5
Computer Gaming World	4.5/5
GameSpot	8.6/10
GameZone	9.5/10
IGN	8.8/10
Next Generation	4/5
PC Format	87%
PC Gamer (UK)	84%
PC Gamer (US)	85%
PC Zone	75/100

Icewind Dale was well received by critics, scoring 86% from GameRankings and 87/100 from Metacritic. Computer Gaming World, GameSpot, The Electric Playground and CNET Gamecenter nominated it as the top computer role-playing game of 2000, although all four awards went to Baldur's Gate II: Shadows of Amn.

GameSpot's Greg Kasavin gave the game 8.6/10, opining it is "well suited for fans of Black Isle Studios' previous games, fans of classic hack-and-slash AD&D computer games, and anyone looking for an action-packed role-playing game with a lot of depth". IGN scored it 8.8/10 and GameZone gave it 9.5/10. According to GameSpy's Allen Rausch, "Icewind Dale was a fun dungeon romp that can hold its head up high, even if it can't match its big brothers". The game's music score by Jeremy Soule received widespread critical acclaim. Chris Chan of the New Straits Times said the game was one of the best he ever played, and went on to positively compare it with Diablo II.

The strongest criticism was that the gameplay was too uniform and was mostly combat-focused, with little interaction or investigation. Bob Low of the Daily Record noted technical issues such as poor pathfinding and occasional crashes. PC Zone criticized its similarities to previous Infinity Engine games. IGN ranked Icewind Dale No. 6 on their list of "The Top 11 Dungeons & Dragons Games of All Time" in 2014. Ian Williams of Paste rated the game #3 on his list of "The 10 Greatest Dungeons and Dragons Videogames" in 2015.

Kevin Rice reviewed the PC version of the game for Next Generation, rating it four stars out of five, and stated that "a huge, engrossing game with the most action in the Forgotten Realms series, Icewind Dale earns its place on the hard drive of any self-respecting RPG fan".

During the Academy of Interactive Arts & Sciences' 4th Annual Interactive Achievement Awards, Icewind Dale received a nomination for the "PC Role-Playing" award, which was ultimately given to Diablo II.

=== Sales ===
In the United States, Icewind Dale debuted at #4 on PC Data's weekly computer game sales rankings for June 25–July 1, 2000, following the title's release on the 30th. Domestic sales for the period totaled 39,285 copies, which drew revenues of $1.71 million. Mark Asher of CNET Gamecenter called this performance a "mild surprise" and noted that the game was "doing well". It was the country's 16th-best-selling computer game for the month of June. After retaining position 4 in its second week, it dropped to sixth place in its third week. Computer Games Magazine reported that Icewind Dale was among the titles that "dominated the retail charts in the U.S. for the month of July". It was the United States' sixth-highest computer game seller of July and 16th-highest of August, moving 21,923 units and earning $1.05 million during the latter month alone. The game remained in PC Data's weekly top 10 until the week ending August 5. Three days later, Interplay's Brian Fargo noted that Icewind Dale was "selling beyond our forecasts and in number one position[s] in certain European territories".

According to Chart-Track, Icewind Dale was the United Kingdom's best-selling computer game for its debut week, breaking Diablo II's three-week streak in the region. It dropped to third place the following week, before falling to seventh. Discussing Icewind Dale's chart performance, a writer for PC Zone mentioned being "a little surprised at seeing Diablo II capitulate so easily, especially to Icewind Dale, despite the success of Baldur's Gate". Icewind Dale was the United Kingdom's third-best-selling computer title in August, placing above Diablo II for the month. According to PC Gamer US, it also achieved "high sales" in Germany, where it debuted in 17th place on the computer game sales charts in July. After peaking at #5 the following month, it claimed places 16 and 29 in September and October before exiting Germany's top 30.

By the end of 2000, Icewind Dale had sold 145,564 copies and earned $6.8 million in the United States, according to PC Data. Its sales by early 2001 totaled more than 350,000 units worldwide, including 45,000 units in Germany. Global sales had surpassed 400,000 units by April 2001. As of 2006, the lifetime domestic sales of Icewind Dale had reached 270,000 copies ($9.5 million), while the Icewind Dale franchise together had sold 580,000 units domestically. In August 2006, Edge ranked the original Icewind Dale as the United States' 74th-best-selling computer game, and best-selling Icewind Dale title, released since January 2000.

== Legacy ==
=== Follow-ups and re-releases ===
Due to the early sales performance of Icewind Dale, Interplay and Black Isle Studios put an expansion pack, Icewind Dale: Heart of Winter, into development within two weeks of the original game's launch. Producer Darren Monahan said that the team "included a lot of fan feedback, particularly relating to the balances of each of the classes in the original game." Another focus lay on importing code and features created for Baldur's Gate II to the Icewind Dale series. Heart of Winter was officially released on February 21, 2001. The game was followed by a downloadable add-on, Trials of the Luremaster, in early July 2001.

During the creation of Heart of Winter and Trials of the Luremaster, Black Isle developed ideas for a full sequel, Icewind Dale II. It entered production in late July 2001, just as the Black Isle's Torn project was scrapped, according to designer Dave Maldonado. Discussing the rationale behind Icewind Dale II, designer J. E. Sawyer said that it was about "limiting risks and maximizing our chances for a popular title". Announced in February 2002, Icewind Dale II shipped on August 27, 2002.

Icewind Dale and Heart of Winter were re-released in two budget packages in 2002, entitled Icewind Dale: The Collection and Icewind Dale: Complete. They were re-released again in 2002 alongside Baldur's Gate and Planescape: Torment in Black Isle Compilation. A collector's edition called Icewind Dale: The Ultimate Collection, which included the sequel Icewind Dale II and its expansion, was released in 2003. All four games were released again in Black Isle Compilation – Part Two in 2004, in Ultimate Dungeons & Dragons in 2006, and in Atari's Rollenspiele: Deluxe Edition in 2007. Icewind Dale was again re-released on October 6, 2010, complete with expansion packs on GOG.com.

=== Remake ===
A remake of Icewind Dale was developed by Beamdog's Overhaul Games and published by Atari for Windows, OS X, Linux, Android, and iOS in 2014.
