= Sarevok =

Baldur's Gate character

- Baldur's Gate character
- Promotional artwork of Sarevok for the 1998 video game Baldur's Gate.
- First appearance: Baldur's Gate (1998)
- Voiced by: Kevin Michael Richardson; Redd Pepper (Baldur's Gate 3)

In-universe information
- Family: Bhaal (father)

Sarevok Anchev, often known mononymously as Sarevok, is a character in the Baldur's Gate series of role-playing video games. He first appears as the principal antagonist of BioWare's 1998 game Baldur's Gate, in which he is revealed to be one of the Bhaalspawn, mortal children of the dead god Bhaal, and the half-brother of the player character. Seeking to inherit Bhaal's divine power, Sarevok engineers political and economic instability around the city of Baldur's Gate in an attempt to provoke a war and achieve both political power and godhood. Sarevok later returns in Baldur's Gate II: Throne of Bhaal as an optional playable companion. The character is voiced in the original games by Kevin Michael Richardson, and by Redd Pepper in Baldur's Gate 3.

Contemporary coverage highlighted the reversal of Sarevok's earlier role as the former principal antagonist into a companion character and party member in Throne of Bhaal. Critical and scholarly discussion has focused on his role as a dark counterpart to the player character when it comes to their shared divine heritage, and whether the relative simplicity of his motivations makes him an effective antagonist.

== Concept and development ==
Sarevok originated partly in tabletop role-playing game played by Baldur's Gate lead designer James Ohlen and his friends. Ohlen later recalled that a character named Sarevok, played by his friend Jeff Veitenheimer, was among the childhood characters that inspired the characters subsequently adapted for Baldur's Gate. Sarevok's role in the first Baldur's Gate serves as the culmination of both the political conspiracy surrounding the Sword Coast's iron shortage and the revelation of the player character's divine ancestry.

Sarevok was voiced by Kevin Michael Richardson, who also served as the narrator of the original Baldur's Gate. Richardson returned to voice the character when Sarevok was made playable in Throne of Bhaal. Prior to the expansion's release, Sarevok's return was presented as one of its major surprises: rather than again functioning solely as an antagonist, he could be restored to life and recruited by the protagonist as a party member. Redd Pepper voiced Sarevok in Baldur's Gate 3.

BioWare originally considered a much larger role for Sarevok during development of Baldur's Gate II: Shadows of Amn. Ohlen disclosed in a 2026 interview that he had proposed a time-travel storyline involving the Planar Sphere in which someone would alter history so that Sarevok won the events of the first game and became dictator of the Sword Coast. The player would have visited this alternate future and attempted to restore the original timeline. The idea was abandoned before dialogue was written after designer Kevin Martens opposed further expansion of the already large game.

== Appearances ==
=== Baldur's Gate ===
Sarevok first appears early in Baldur's Gate as an armored warrior who ambushes Gorion and his ward, the player character, after they leave the library fortress Candlekeep. Gorion is killed while allowing his ward to escape. The player subsequently becomes involved in an investigation into shortages and contamination affecting the Sword Coast's iron supply, eventually uncovering a conspiracy involving the commercial organization known as the Iron Throne. Sarevok is ultimately revealed to be both a leader of the conspiracy and another child of Bhaal. He intends to exploit hostility and destabilize relations between Baldur's Gate and neighbouring Amn and further his attempt to inherit the divine power of the dead god of murder. At the same time, the resulting crisis intended to facilitate his rise to political power, and the goal of his political manoeuvring is to place him in a position to become one of Baldur's Gate's rulers.

Sarevok also infiltrates Candlekeep under the alias "Koveras", manipulating events surrounding the Iron Throne leadership and framing Gorion's ward for the murder of the organization's leaders. Gorion's ward eventually exposes his plans and confronts him in a temple of Bhaal beneath Baldur's Gate, where Sarevok is defeated and killed.

=== Baldur's Gate II ===
Although Sarevok is dead during the main narrative of Baldur's Gate II: Shadows of Amn, he appears in the game's final sequence in the Nine Hells. During a series of moral trials faced by the player character, Sarevok appears as the representative of Wrath and attempts to provoke the protagonist into surrendering to the murderous influence inherited from Bhaal. Regardless of the player's response, Sarevok must again be defeated.

In the expansion Throne of Bhaal, the player character must restore him to life in the Pocket Plane to progress the plot and in return for his assistance. He may join the player's party as a companion into the conclusion of the Bhaalspawn storyline.

=== Baldur's Gate 3 ===
Sarevok makes an appearance during the third act of Baldur's Gate 3. The player character of the game is led to the temple of Bhaal following their attempts to uncover a set of murders by a cult dedicated to Bhaal. In doing so, they encounter Sarevok, who was controlling the entrance to the temple as the head of the Murder Tribunal and had kidnapped the detective looking into the murders. Unless the player is playing as the Dark Urge or wishes to join the cult of Bhaal, they are forced to fight and kill Sarevok to advance.

== Reception ==
Retrospective coverage have identify Sarevok as one of the series' principal figures. Graeme Mason's retrospective history of Baldur's Gate for PC Gamer included Sarevok among its selected "heroes and villains", summarising his relationship to Gorion's Ward, adoption into the Iron Throne and ambition to replace Bhaal as a god.

In an essay published by Vice, Cameron Kunzelman praised the simplicity of Sarevok's villainy because he lacks the sympathetic or morally self-justifying motivation frequently given to fictional antagonists. Kunzelman argued that Sarevok's direct pursuit of murder, political destabilisation and divine power allows him to function effectively as a threatening mirror of the protagonist without requiring the player to empathise with him. Kunzelman described Sarevok as a deliberate parallel to the protagonist: both are children of Bhaal and both spend their youth learning about the world, but the protagonist is raised by Gorion in Candlekeep while Sarevok comes to understand his heritage through a pursuit of Bhaal's legacy. Kunzelman argued that the resemblance ends there: while many fictional antagonists understand themselves as pursuing some greater good, Sarevok seeks mass killing and personal apotheosis without attempting to justify those goals as beneficial to anyone else. For Kunzelman, this lack of sympathetic motivation distinguishes Sarevok from the tendency to portray villains as misunderstood protagonists of their own stories. He characterised Sarevok instead as an existential threat whose conflict with the protagonist emerges principally from their shared parentage and incompatible ambitions. He further argued that Sarevok's ultimate failure is notable because the wider Forgotten Realms is essentially unchanged by either his ambitions or his death, undercutting the grandeur of his attempt to become a god.

Academic Rebecca Grose examined Sarevok in the context of the moral architecture of Baldur's Gate. She argued that while the game allows substantial variation in the player's local behaviour, alignment and reputation, the overarching narrative remains comparatively fixed. Whether the player develops Gorion's Ward as a conventional hero or as an evil character with ambitions of their own, the story still culminates in a confrontation with Sarevok. Grose noted that an evil protagonist can oppose Sarevok not out of altruism but because they may themselves seek the power associated with Bhaal, allowing the same mandatory confrontation to support different player motivations. For Bell, Gorion's murder marked the event that removes the security of childhood for the player character and forces them to begin acting independently. Sarevok's appearance during the Trial of Wrath in Shadows of Amn transforms the same adversary into an embodiment of the protagonist's inherited capacity for violence. He interpreted the encounter as a test in which choosing pity instead of wrath allows a morally good protagonist to reject that inheritance. Bell connected the confrontation with Sarevok to the game's wider treatment of violence, observing that defeated enemies repeatedly return and must be killed again. Bell concludes that Sarevok, together with Jon Irenicus, serve their function as adversaries whose actions helps propel Gorion's Ward from an obscure life in Candlekeep toward the power and choices associated with the Bhaalspawn legacy.

Other critics have regarded the simplicity of Sarevok's characterization as a limitation. In its review of Baldur's Gate II: Enhanced Edition, GameSpot described Sarevok as a more "prototypical" villain than Jon Irenicus, whom the reviewer considered the more memorable antagonist. Richard Cobbett of PC Gamer, writing for the twentieth anniversary of the original game, criticised aspects of the storytelling surrounding Sarevok, singling out the character's use of the transparent alias "Koveras", his name written backwards, as an example of the first game's occasionally clumsy narrative presentation.
