= MacPlay =

Video game publisher

- 2000-2004 logo
- Industry: Video games
- Founded: early 1990s re-launched 2000, 2015, and 2025.
- Headquarters: Dallas, Texas, United States
- Key people: Rebecca Heineman, Owner
- Parent: Olde Sküül
- Website: macplay.com

MacPlay is the name used by a series of three American publishers of Macintosh video games. MacPlay was founded to bring more focus to Interplay’s Mac games.

== History ==
1990-1997 logo

MacPlay was founded in the early 1990s as a division of Interplay Entertainment. It was led by producer Bill Dugan. During this period, MacPlay published notable games including Wolfenstein 3D, Out of this World, the Alone in the Dark series, and the Descent series. Due to the mid-to-late 1990s decline in the Mac market, Interplay exited the Macintosh games market and abandoned the MacPlay division in late 1997, with Fallout being the final release of this incarnation.

In 2000, United Developers LLC licensed the MacPlay brand name from Interplay for use as the name of a wholly owned subsidiary corporation. Ron Dimant became CEO of this new incarnation of MacPlay, which was headquartered in Dallas, Texas. In the early 2000s, MacPlay published two lines of games-regular games and "value" games. Notable games published during this period included Baldur's Gate II, Majesty: The Fantasy Kingdom Sim, and the first two games in the Fallout series. The last game published by MacPlay was Tron 2.0 in June 2004.

United Developers continues to hold the rights to the MacPlay name. From November 2004-2008, the MacPlay.com domain was used as a software retail outlet. In 2008, the MacPlay.com domain was changed to redirect to MumboJumbo, itself a subsidiary of United Developers founded by MacPlay CEO Ron Dimant and located in Dallas, Texas.

MacPlay re-launched as a publisher of Macintosh video games on the Mac App Store. The company in April 2015 released Pillars of Eternity on the Mac App Store. The company has published a number of other games such as Shelter 2, Prison Architect, Human Fall Flat, and Cities in Motion.

MacPlay was purchased by former Interplay founder Rebecca Heineman in January 2025. Having kept the source code of over a thousand games she had ported, Heineman hoped to solve "a dearth of games on the Mac" with native ports and updates.

== See also ==
- Mac gaming
