= Baldur's Gate II: Throne of Bhaal =

Expansion pack

- Developer: BioWare (Note: Mac port co-developed by SquidSoft and Ideas from the Deep.)
- Publisher: Black Isle Studios Interplay Entertainment (Note: Mac port published by MacPlay.)
- Director: James Ohlen
- Producer: Douglas W. Avery
- Designer: Kevin Martens
- Programmer: Mark Darrah
- Artist: Matthew M. Goldman
- Composers: Howard Drossin; Inon Zur
- Series: Baldur's Gate
- Engine: Infinity Engine
- Platforms: Windows, Macintosh
- Release: Windows: NA: 19 June 2001; EU: August 2001; Mac OS, Mac OS X 21 November 2003
- Genre: Role-playing
- Modes: Single-player, multiplayer

Baldur's Gate II: Throne of Bhaal is a 2001 expansion pack for the role-playing video game Baldur's Gate II: Shadows of Amn. It adds a multi-level dungeon called Watcher's Keep to the game and completes the main plot. There are several new weapons, a higher level cap, a further refined Infinity graphics engine, and new class-related features and magical skills. The novelization of the game was written by Drew Karpyshyn and released in September 2001.

== Gameplay ==
The gameplay is similar to previous entries in the Baldur's Gate series, with the player controlling a party of up to six characters, including the protagonist, who can be custom designed at the beginning of the game. The player can also import their character from either Baldur's Gate or Baldur's Gate II: Shadows of Amn.

In expanding from the original game, Baldur's Gate II: Throne of Bhaal adds a number of features that distinguish it from the original. It is set in a number of new locations in Tethyr. It has a new level 40 experience limit, new high-level monsters, and new items. It has a new dungeon, Watcher's Keep, which can be accessed from both the original Shadows of Amn game and the Throne of Bhaal campaign. All of the non-player characters (NPCs) from the original game are available with the exception of Yoshimo. The game also adds a new NPC, Sarevok, and a new mage class kit, Wild Mage.

== Plot ==
=== Story ===
The story is based on a war that breaks out in Tethyr amongst the Bhaalspawn. The player character (PC) must venture through regions including the city of Saradush, which is under siege by fire giants, a fortress in the Underdark, and a monastery in Amkethran. Through the game, the PC has to defeat a quintet of legendary Bhaalspawn, known as The Five.

As the story progresses, The Five kill all their brethren, despite the efforts of Melissan, a woman trying to save all the innocent Bhaalspawn and keep them safe in Saradush. Only when the PC kills off The Five and uncovers their own power is the truth revealed: Melissan is in fact Amelyssan the Blackhearted, the mastermind behind both The Five and the slaughterer of all the Bhaalspawn. She was once Bhaal's high priestess, to whom he entrusted the task of his resurrection. She does not intend to resurrect the god, however. Instead, she is preparing to become the Goddess of Murder herself.

With all quests finished and all Bhaalspawn killed, the PC must journey to the planar Throne of Bhaal for the great final battle against Amelyssan. Ultimately, the PC is presented with the choice of either ascending the throne of Bhaal or destroying it and returning to peaceful life as a mortal. If the PC chooses to ascend, they have the option of either becoming the new God of Murder or becoming a deity dedicated to good and righteousness.

=== Characters ===
- Melissan is a mysterious woman who meets the main character early in the game and offers help and information. Melissan claims to help the innocent Bhaalspawn who are caught up in the war and solicits the main character's help throughout the story. Her real motives remain mysterious throughout most of the game. Her true name is revealed to be Amelyssan the Blackhearted, and she is the mastermind behind the Five and the deaths of all Bhaalspawn. She is to become the new goddess of Murder and is the final enemy in the Baldur's Gate saga. She is voiced by Heidi Shannon.
- Illasera is a weak elven Bhaalspawn with a lot of bravado. She is the first Bhaalspawn the PC encounters in the Throne of Bhaal. She is voiced by Grey DeLisle.
- Yaga-Shura is a fire giant besieging the city of Saradush with his army. He would be invulnerable but for his Achilles' heel, his heart, whose destruction renders him vulnerable but no less fearsome. He is voiced by Kevin Michael Richardson.
- Sendai is a drow cleric and mage. The PC does not get the chance to battle her immediately, but must first defeat wave after wave of statues of Sendai. She is voiced by Vanessa Marshall.
- Abazigal is a half-dragon of great power. The PC has to first kill his son, Draconis, outside Abazigal's lair before setting up a meeting with him. Both Abazigal and Draconis begin fighting in human forms before changing into their immensely more powerful dragon forms during their respective encounters. Abazigal is voiced by Jim Cummings.
- Balthazar is a good-aligned monk of immense power, who feels the only way to destroy the curse of Bhaal is to become the Lord of Murder and then end his own life. He is voiced by Jeff Osterhage.
- Gromnir Il-Khan is a half-orc Bhaalspawn who is the leader of the town of Saradush. While at the beginning it is believed that he is mad and paranoid, his wild theories about Melissan turn out to be true. He is voiced by Jim Cummings.
- Cespenar is an imp who can refer to his "secret recipes" in order to forge wonderful weapons from special bits of items that the PC collects along his journey. He claims that he is the main character's private butler and respects them as the "Great One". He is voiced by Jeff Bennett.
- Solar is a celestial being who teaches the player character in the PC's pocket plane. She is voiced by Charity James.
- Demogorgon is a demon prince of tremendous power included in the Watcher's Keep expansion area as an optional boss. He is voiced by Jim Cummings.

== Reception ==
=== Sales ===
In the United States, Throne of Bhaal entered at #5 on NPD Intelect's computer game sales chart for the 24–30 June period, then fell to #7 in its second week and #10 in its third. It debuted in 13th place on NPD Intelect's monthly chart for June 2001 as a whole. By the game's fourth week, it was absent from the weekly top 10, but it remained on the monthly sales charts at 13th in July and 20th in August, according to NPD. It exited the monthly top 20 by September. By the first week of November, Throne of Bhaal had sold 85,451 units in the United States alone. Remarking on this performance at the time, GameSpot writer Desslock noted that the game had "sold well and continue[s] to do so". Its sales in the United States were above 100,000 units, but below 480,000 units, by 2006.

According to BioWare, global sales of Throne of Bhaal reached roughly 500,000 copies by December 2002.

=== Critical reviews ===
Reception

Aggregate scores
Aggregator	Score
GameRankings	89%
Metacritic	88/100

Chris Chan of the New Straits Times gave Throne of Bhaal a favorable review and praised available customisation options. GameSpy called the game a "brilliant end to a brilliant gaming saga". IGN awarded Throne of Bhaal an Editors' Choice Award.

=== Awards ===
Throne of Bhaal received the "PC Role-Playing" award from the Academy of Interactive Arts & Sciences during the 5th Annual Interactive Achievement Awards. It was named the year's best computer game expansion pack by Computer Gaming World, IGN, RPG Vault, GameSpy and—tying with Command & Conquer: Yuri's Revenge—PC Gamer US. GameSpot and Computer Games Magazine nominated it as the best expansion pack of 2001, but it lost these prizes to Yuri's Revenge and Diablo II: Lord of Destruction, respectively. It was also a finalist in The Electric Playground's "Best RPG for PC" category, which went to Arcanum: Of Steamworks and Magick Obscura.

The editors of Computer Gaming World wrote: "Throne of Bhaal did what Ultima IX should have done: provided a great send-off to an established franchise. It's a superlative, satisfying reward for those who shepherded their little hero all the way from BG1". Those of PC Gamer US called it "as masterful as its predecessor, Baldur's Gate II" and wrote that it "may be the most expansive expansion pack ever".
