= Baldur's Gate II: Shadows of Amn =

2000 video game

- Developer: BioWare (Note: Ported to Macintosh by MumboJumbo.)
- Publishers: Black Isle Studios; Interplay Entertainment
- Producer: Ben Smedstad
- Designers: James Ohlen; Kevin Martens
- Programmer: Mark Darrah
- Artist: Marcia Tofer
- Writer: James Ohlen
- Composer: Michael Hoenig (Note: Additional music by Howard Drossin)
- Series: Baldur's Gate
- Engine: Infinity Engine
- Platforms: Windows; Mac OS
- Release: Windows: NA: September 21, 2000; PAL: September 29, 2000; Mac OS: NA: October 15, 2001
- Genre: Role-playing
- Modes: Single-player, multiplayer

Baldur's Gate II: Shadows of Amn is a 2000 role-playing video game developed by BioWare and published by Interplay Entertainment for Windows in September 2000. It is the sequel to 1998's Baldur's Gate. Following its predecessor, the game takes place in the Forgotten Realms, a fantasy campaign setting, and is based on the Advanced Dungeons & Dragons 2nd edition rules. Powered by BioWare's Infinity Engine, Baldur's Gate II uses an isometric perspective and pausable real-time gameplay. The player controls a party of up to six characters, one of whom is the player-created protagonist; the others are certain characters recruited from the game world.

Much of Baldur's Gate II takes place in and around Athkatla, a city in the country of Amn. Opening shortly after the events of Baldur's Gate, the game continues the story of the protagonist, Gorion's Ward, whose unique heritage has now drawn the attention of Jon Irenicus, a powerful and sinister mage. The storyline revolves around the machinations of Irenicus and the player's encounters with him.

Development began in January 1999. BioWare set out to improve upon the first Baldur's Gate in every way possible. From a list of constructive criticism—compiled from the suggestions of fans, reviews, and internal suggestions—a list of features to be added to the game was distilled: some of these were 800×600 resolution, 3D support, and character kits. For Baldur's Gate, the game's engine and content were being developed at the same time, whereas with Baldur's Gate II, the engine was working from the start. Having a completed engine meant they could direct their efforts towards making content, instead of focusing on basic functionality.

Shadows of Amn received critical acclaim, being praised for its gameplay, artwork, and voice acting, and is widely regarded as one of the best video games ever made. GameSpy, GameSpot, and IGN awarded it their "Role-Playing Game of the Year" awards for 2000, and the game has sold more than two million units. An expansion pack, Baldur's Gate II: Throne of Bhaal, was released in 2001. This well-received expansion, besides adding a large dungeon and enhancements to the game, concluded the main storyline. Shadows of Amn and Throne of Bhaal have been included together in various compilations. In 2013, an enhanced version of Baldur's Gate II was released, carrying the title Baldur's Gate II: Enhanced Edition and using an updated version of the Infinity Engine. A sequel, Baldur's Gate 3, developed by Larian Studios, was released in 2023.

== Gameplay ==
An instance of dialogue in the game, illustrating the game's interface and isometric perspective

Baldur's Gate II: Shadows of Amn is an Advanced Dungeons & Dragons 2nd edition computer role-playing game. The central quest of the game consists of about 50 to 60 hours of play, while the full game, including all side quests, is estimated to be between 200 and 300 hours. The player controls a party of up to six characters, one of whom is the protagonist; if the protagonist dies, a saved-game must be loaded, or a new game begun. The game begins with character creation through a series of configuration screens, choosing such things as class, ability scores, appearance, and alignment. Alternatively, an existing character from Baldur's Gate or its expansion Tales of the Sword Coast can be imported. Once in the game world, the player may recruit certain non-player characters (NPCs) to travel with him or her, though only five may do so at a time; depending on who is present in the group, bickering, romance, and side quests can result. NPCs in the party often converse with the player or with one another, and at times interject into the player's conversations with others.

The game is played from an isometric perspective, and the screen, which does not need to remain centered on the protagonist, can be scrolled with the mouse or keyboard. Areas are revealed as they are explored by the player's characters. A fog of war effect hides explored areas when the player's characters move away from them. The player can also change the formation in which the party moves. Clicking an area exit, such as a doorway or staircase, causes another area to be loaded. Clicking on the edge of an outside area causes the party to travel there; the game then presents the player with the World Map, from which the player may select a destination.

The player interacts with characters and objects by clicking on them. Clicking on the ground causes the player's selected characters to move. The gameplay, though in real-time, can be paused, whereupon commands may be issued to controllable characters, who will attempt to execute them when the game is unpaused. The game can also be set to pause automatically at certain times. Dialogue is started by NPCs at certain scripted times, or by the player's clicking on NPCs who are not immediately hostile. When speaking to an NPC, the player must often choose what to say from a list of responses. The dialogue may lead to quests or important information. When the player clicks on a hostile being, the currently selected characters will advance to attack it. Information about characters, creatures, items, and buildings in the game environment is shown on a tool tip, which appears when the mouse pointer is held over game elements.

When a character in the group gains the necessary experience points, he or she gains a level. Experience points are awarded for certain player actions, such as killing enemies or completing quests. The party also has a reputation, which is affected by the player's moral actions, and which, along with the party leader's charisma attribute, influences how NPCs in the game world react to the player. The characters in the party will also complain if the party's reputation conflicts with their alignment. Resting heals the characters in the party and refreshes those who are fatigued; also, resting allows a character to memorize spells. The game contains over 300 spells available for memorization. With the exception of sorcerers, magic-users must memorize spells before they can be cast. Spell-casting takes time and may be disrupted by attacks or other spells.

The player can access sub-screens through the interface: area and world maps; the journal, which tracks important information, such as quests and the game's plot; the inventory page, which is used to manage and equip items; the record screen, which is used to view information about, as well as level up, characters in the party; the mage book and priest scroll screens, where spells can be inspected and memorized; and the options screen, where settings may be altered, saved-games loaded, or the game saved or quit.

=== Classes and kits ===
During character creation the player chooses a class: fighter, ranger, paladin, thief, bard, mage, cleric, druid, barbarian, monk, or sorcerer (the last three of which are new for the game). Different classes have different special abilities and restrictions; a thief character, for instance, can find and remove traps, but thieves have limitations on which weapons and armor they may use, and cannot be of lawful good alignment. Most classes also have a subset of kits, or specializations within a class, to choose from. Kits have special advantages and, usually, disadvantages; for example, the cavalier—one of the kits of the paladin class—specializes in fighting monsters such as dragons and demons, but cannot use missile weapons. At some point in the game, the player may join or take over a stronghold. The type of stronghold is determined by the protagonist's class.

=== Multiplayer ===
The game also has a multiplayer mode, in which up to six human players can adventure through the game, controlling player-made characters as well as recruited NPCs. The content of the game is otherwise the same, and one player controls the protagonist.

== Plot ==
=== Setting ===
In the Government District, Athkatla, are the Council of Six building, the Prison, and the estates of the rich nobility.

The Forgotten Realms, the high fantasy campaign setting in which Baldur's Gate II is set, is a fictional world similar to a medieval Earth, but with its own peoples, geography, and history. In the Realms, as its inhabitants call it, fantastic creatures and magic are common.

Baldur's Gate II takes place mainly in Amn, a country on the subcontinent of Faerûn. This country, known commonly as the Merchant Kingdom, lies south of Baldur's Gate; wealth and trade are the chief concerns of the region. The capital city of Athkatla, around which a fair portion of the game revolves, is the most important city in Amn and is ruled by the anonymous Council of Six. The local thieves' guild, the Shadow Thieves, also has considerable power. The group, which operates all along the Sword Coast, is based in Athkatla. Another powerful organization in Amn are the Cowled Wizards, who regulate the use of magic in the region. The Shadow Thieves, the Cowled Wizards, and the Harpers, a semi-secret conglomeration of good organizations, all factor prominently into the story and provide side quests.

Besides Athkatla, other places the player will pass through include: an island, on which stands both the port town of Brynnlaw and the asylum Spellhold; the Underdark; the city of Suldanessellar; and the Astral Plane. There are also other places, which may be explored: the Umar Hills, where people have been disappearing; a temple ruins, fallen under the shadow of the Shade Lord; the de'Arnise Keep, home of the de'Arnises but recently overrun by trolls; the town of Trademeet, under attack by animals; a druid grove connected to Trademeet's woes; the Windspear Hills, where the player becomes entangled in the intrigues of Firkraag, a dragon; the underwater Sahuagin city; and the Planar Prison.

Baldur's Gate II is set in the year 1369 DR (Dale Reckoning), and thus takes place not long after the Time of Troubles (1358 DR), when the Tablets of Fate, powerful magic items which maintain a balance between good and evil, were stolen. Lord Ao, the Overdeity, forced the gods to become mortal until the Tablets were found; some gods died while in this mortal state.

=== Characters ===
Bhaal, the God of Murder, was slain by an adventurer named Cyric, who himself became a god, but Bhaal foresaw his destruction and walked the land before the other gods. He left behind him "a score of mortal progeny", whose later deaths, when they were slain by heroes, would fuel his rebirth. The game's protagonist is one of these offspring, but, through the choices of the player, may be either good or evil. The character grew up in the library fortress of Candlekeep, watched over by the mage Gorion. Imoen, who grew up there as well, became a close friend. The story of the first Baldur's Gate followed their adventure along the Sword Coast, where the hero learned of their heritage and defeated their half-brother Sarevok, a fellow child of Bhaal.

In Baldur's Gate II, several characters from the first game reappear, of which the following can join the player's party: Imoen, who grew up with the protagonist in Candlekeep; Jaheira, who, with her husband Khalid, was a friend of Gorion's; Minsc, a warrior who carries with him a hamster named Boo; Edwin, a Red Wizard of Thay; and Viconia, a dark elf cleric. There are also many new NPCs who may join the party: Aerie, a winged elf who has lost her wings and was sold to the circus by slavers at a young age; Keldorn, an older paladin and a powerful and respected member of the Most Noble Order of the Radiant Heart; Mazzy, an honorable halfling fighter and "the nearest thing to a paladin that a halfling can aspire to"; Nalia, who is of the upper class, but, though conscious of class distinction, tries to help those less fortunate than herself; Valygar, who is of a family noted for its talented magic-users, but hates the art; Anomen, a member of the Most Noble Order of the Radiant Heart, and whose wish is to become a full knight; Cernd, a druid; Haer'Dalis, a tiefling bard and one of the actors of an acting troupe; Jan, a gnome, of the Jansen family; Yoshimo, a thief from the land of Kara-Tur; and Korgan, an evil dwarven fighter.

Other notable characters in Shadows of Amn include Gaelan Bayle, who offers the party the help of the Shadow Thieves; Aran Linvail, the leader of the Shadow Thieves; Saemon Havarian, who sails the party to an island; Adalon, a silver dragon whose eggs have been stolen and given to drow; Elhan, the commander of the defenders of the elven city of Suldanessellar; and Queen Ellesime, the ruler of Suldanessellar. Jon Irenicus and his sister Bodhi are the chief antagonists, Irenicus being the main villain of the game. Forgotten Realms character Drizzt Do'Urden also makes an appearance; if the player solicits his aid, he and his companions will later help the player.

=== Story ===
Shortly after the events of Baldur's Gate, the party led by Gorion's Ward are overcome and taken captive. When the game opens, the player character awakens in a cage and is then experimented on by a wizard, who is aware of the player character's heritage and speaks of "untapped power". The wizard is distracted as his complex is under attack, disappears to fight them. Imoen, appearing from a side room, frees the player character. Jaheira and Minsc are also held in cells close by. Minsc reveals that his companion Dynaheir was killed sometime after their capture, while Jaheira's husband Khalid is later found tortured to death, leaving Jaheira emotionally devastated. The characters fight their way through the underground complex, learning more and more of their captor's despicable character and that his name is Irenicus. At length, escaping the complex, they emerge into the city of Athkatla and witness Irenicus fighting off some of his attackers, whom he destroys. An argument then ensues, during which Imoen angrily attacks Irenicus using magic. The Cowled Wizards appear and, after a fight, arrest both Irenicus and Imoen for the unsanctioned use of magic, and teleport both of them away.

In the slums of Athkatla, a man named Gaelan Bayle offers the party the help of a powerful organization known as the Shadow Thieves, who can find Imoen or Irenicus for the large sum of 20,000 gold pieces. The party is later approached by and offered the help of another rival guild headed by a woman named Bodhi; it is the player's choice whom to side with. Meanwhile, Imoen and Irenicus have been removed to an asylum called Spellhold, which is situated on an island. Irenicus soon breaks his bonds and prepares to experiment on Imoen.

Back in Athkatla, the party raises the money necessary and receives assistance from whichever organization it has decided to work with, and gains passage to the island on a ship sailed by the dubious and treacherous Saemon Havarian. The heroes then manage to get inside Spellhold, but they are captured by Irenicus, who has taken control of the prison and had planned all along to bring the protagonist there. Irenicus then subjects the protagonist to a ritual, taking the latter's soul. Imoen, who turns out to be a Child of Bhaal as well, had earlier undergone Irenicus's ritual, and her soul has gone to Bodhi, Irenicus's sister. Bodhi then abandons the party to the maze beneath Spellhold, so that she can hunt them after a span of time, saying also, as bait, that Irenicus may yet be foiled. When they face her, the player character who is now soulless loses control and transforms into a creature called the Slayer, one of the avatar forms of Bhaal. Bodhi, quite taken aback, retreats to tell Irenicus of it. The player character returns to their normal self after a short while. Soon, with the aid of Spellhold's inmates, the party battles Irenicus, forcing him to retreat. The party follows, and reaches the surface via the Underdark.

Upon reaching the surface, the party encounters the army of the elven city of Suldanessellar. The elves cannot return to the city, for Irenicus has magically hidden it. To gain access to it, the party secures the Rhynn Lanthorn from Bodhi, who has stolen the artifact; upon Bodhi's death, Imoen's soul is restored. The Rhynn Lanthorn lights the way to Suldanessellar, which has been invaded by Irenicus and his minions. The party proceeds through the city and, at the Tree of Life, learns that Irenicus is draining the power of the Tree, which will doom Suldanessellar. The heroes defeat him, but because Irenicus still has the protagonist's soul, the protagonist is dragged with the wizard into Hell, and the rest of the party are dragged along also. When they defeat Irenicus, they return to life and are honored by the elves of Suldanessellar.

== Development ==
Baldur's Gate II was developed by BioWare and published by Black Isle Studios, a division of Interplay Entertainment. The game uses the same Infinity Engine as Baldur's Gate (1998), but with many improvements. Other games that used this engine were Black Isle Studios' Planescape: Torment (1999) and Icewind Dale (2000). BioWare dedicated Baldur's Gate II to Daniel Walker, who died in 1999 and was the company's second employee.

Though a success, both commercially and critically, Baldur's Gate was the first role-playing game designed by BioWare, and they applied what they learned in the process to Baldur's Gate II. They also felt they did not have enough time to reach their design goals with the first game, due to developing both the content of the game and the Infinity Engine at the same time. In Baldur's Gate II, it was determined that the designers should be allowed "adequate time" so that the game might "reach its full potential". Throughout its development, BioWare focused "on ensuring that Baldur's Gate II is significantly better than Baldur's Gate in every way possible, and to make it appeal not only to fans of the original game but also to make it accessible to new fans who never played the original game".

Development of Baldur's Gate II began in January 1999. From the suggestions of fans on message boards and newsgroups, reviews of Baldur's Gate, and internal suggestions, a list of constructive criticism was compiled; from this list, a slightly shorter one of features to be added to the game was made. Some of the items on this list were: support for higher resolutions, such as 800 by 600 pixels and above; 3D support; non-pausing dialogue in multiplayer; drop off panels in the interface; character kits; dual-wielding of weapons; a streamlined journal and annotable map; deathmatch; and inclusion of famous AD&D monsters such as the dragon. Not many features had to be cut, and they kept as many as they could. Because of the engine's mature state of development, most features were fairly easy to add. Co-lead designer James Ohlen wrote that having a completed engine meant they could direct their efforts towards producing content, instead of focusing on "basic functionality". Producer Ben Smedstad said that "the engine was up and running since day one, which is a huge morale booster. When a monster is complete, we put it into the 'override' directory and it appears in the game! This is a huge change from working on the original". Late in the project, deathmatch was removed, while non-pausing dialogue, which proved "the most problematic feature", was removed early on before being reintroduced in early 2000.

Baldur's Gate II reused the Infinity Engine, which had powered Baldur's Gate, but the engine was improved in many ways since development on Baldur's Gate II began: optional 800×600 resolution as well as the old 640×480 resolution. Drop-away side panels were implemented; for spells and special effects, 3D support was added. Pathfinding had been improved in Tales of the Sword Coast (the Baldur's Gate expansion), and was improved further in Shadows of Amn through a feature called "bumping", which allowed a character to move another one out of the way if the path was blocked. Also, to aid pathfinding even more, paths in dungeons were widened, so that characters would get stuck less often. The interface was also refined a bit.

To avoid some of the design mistakes made in Baldur's Gate, guidelines were drawn up for each department; the level designers had the longest set of guidelines. These lists continually changed and evolved as the development progressed. The main design guidelines for the entire project were that the players should feel like their actions have an effect on the game world, and good versus evil options should be available depending on which path the player takes. Guidelines for the story were to keep the focus on the player's character, keep the player updated on the activities of the game's villain, add a significant plot twist, and make the ending of the game open enough so that there would be room for more sequels. Environment guidelines were to break the game into chapters, make some locations key to the central plot, keep areas interesting and easy to quickly navigate, and showcase areas before they were available to explore to capture player interest. For the game systems, guidelines focused on character customization and a well-crafted reward system. The writing guidelines were concerned mainly with dialogue: limiting the number of sentences NPCs spoke at a time, keeping the number of player response choices at three as often as possible, avoiding profanity and accents, and having a small set of random dialogue for unimportant NPCs. Many early design decisions did not follow the guidelines, and programming constraints were not always followed by other departments, such as design and art, leading to slowdowns in some parts of the game that were difficult or impossible to fix.

The process for creating levels was long and complicated. It began with the creation of a general layout of the area to be built by designers. They would pass this concept map to the artists, who added models to it, beginning with the largest objects and ending with small items such as individual pieces of furniture. After everything was put in place by the art team, designers took over again, inserting graphical enhancements, effects, and collision detection code. With a functional level, creatures, items, traps, and triggers were added last, then scripts were written for everything to control behavior. The team found it quite difficult to keep track of changes made to levels, and there were sometimes communication problems between different parts of the team, such as the artists and designers, resulting in inconsistencies between their work. Co-executive producer Ray Muzyka wrote that "they learned to make sure all elements of the team are talking to each other and working as a group, rather than as a bunch of individuals!" They did feel they had done a good job automating the level creation process, as levels were rapidly designed. Muzyka also said that "a designer might submit a level description and receive it, art complete, a month later ready for scripting, but missing some key features (almost always a door). We would then have to determine whether the omission was important enough to have the art piece redone, or whether we could simply tweak the design of the level to fit the finished art". Areas were made more compact than before, the amount of "dead space" being curtailed, facilitating faster travel between key areas because less distance has to be traveled.

Marcia Tofer, art director for Shadows of Amn, worked with a team of 8 to 12 people to create the game's artwork, such as the backgrounds, monsters, etc. Tofer observed that the city of Baldur's Gate had been their first attempt at city building and what they learned there served to make Athkatla "far more diverse and interesting". City renders took from 18 to 24 hours, though they used hardware that was powerful for those days: multiple dual Pentium IIIs at 500 MHz, coupled with 512 MB of memory.

In traditional mediums like text or film and television, what is read or seen is effectively controlled by the creators. Games are a visual medium, according to Luke Kristjanson, one of the writers and designers on Shadows of Amn, but they are unlike the traditional ones of film and television. For Baldur's Gate, the developers knew what would be seen on the critical path, but not when players would see it, or whether the right amount of significance would be placed upon it.

In Shadows of Amn, several tools were used to remedy these shortcomings. One of these were in-game cutscenes, which were like small plays, "adding suspense and depth to the world and overall story". Cutscenes had been used in Baldur's Gate, but were employed "more effectively" in Shadows of Amn. Another technique was to increase, to a greater degree than Baldur's Gate, the interactivity of the characters that travel with the player. While the characters in Baldur's Gate possessed "banter", there was a very great increase of this in Shadows of Amn, but was not merely an increase in the amount of dialogue and text. NPCs interject, reinforcing "the importance of events [and] contributing their own motivations". They recognize critical junctures in the game, since those are of significance to them as well. They even make comments to each other, as Kristjanson put it: "If Imoen thinks that Jaheira is being too strict she'll say so, and if Jaheira thinks Imoen is being immature she'll counter, and if Minsc thinks the both of them would benefit from getting hamsters of their own [...] he won't hesitate to offer that little nugget of wisdom". Kristjanson noted that the character of Imoen was unexpectedly popular with players of the first game, in spite of the fact that she was a late addition during development and was undeveloped as a character. Kristjanson remarked that her lack of interactions with other characters in the first game projected an impression of closeness to the player character, although this was not intended by the developers; this led to her being revealed as the player character's half-sister in its sequel and an integral character to its plot.

Producer Ben Smedstad, speaking of "crunch time" during the latter stages of a game's development, noted that it was important to begin it at the right time, not too early, nor too late. By July 2000, Shadows of Amn had entered its second phase of crunch, where the hours ran from 9 a.m. to 9 p.m. Mondays to Fridays, and from 9 a.m. to 6 p.m. on Saturdays. Their first crunch phase had been a normal working week, but hours of 9 a.m. to 9 p.m. on Tuesdays and Thursdays, and 12 p.m. to 5 p.m. on Saturdays. "As long as it takes" would be the philosophy of the last phase, encompassing the last week of development. Smedstad said that the second phase, which they were working under in July 2000, is where the stress really begins, and that the third phase is actually not as bad as one might think, because by then people are used to the lengthy hours.

During the game's development, a quality assurance department was added to BioWare, and the game's publishers lent their assistance in testing. Muzyka wrote that "because of its immense size, Baldur's Gate II was a tester's nightmare—this was compounded by the fact that we didn't do enough testing as areas were being developed". The game contained about 290 quests, each of which had to be tested in both single- and multi-player modes. BioWare used a method, introduced to them by Feargus Urquhart, Douglas Avery, and Chris Parker of Black Isle Studios, in which the game's quests were listed on whiteboards, with a cross placed beside each quest. Pairs consisting of a designer and tester worked their way through the quests, each pair covering about six quests per day. When a quest was verified, its cross was removed.

Muzyka wrote:

In the final days of working on BG2 there was a strangely serene feeling in the office. We didn't experience the headlong panic that is sometimes prevalent while finishing a game, but we certainly did experience considerable stress as we built 21 final candidates in 3 days. After a few long nights with the whole team playing the game over and over again, we reached a point where we built a good final candidate. Then it was sent to the duplicators!

=== Audio ===
Black Isle Studios, the publisher, handled the game's voice-over. Producer Chris Parker, writing in April 2000 about the upcoming voice-over recording sessions as Baldur's Gate II neared completion, observed that it could only start once story and dialogue were done. A script would then be put together that, in addition to the lines, would have other information; for example, emotional states and directions that would guide actors to perform lines the right way. Since Black Isle Studios was near Hollywood, there was a lot of voice-over talent in the area. Roughly 50 actors would be needed, and most of the casting would be done by tape using talent they were familiar with. As producer, Parker's job would be to make sure that performances were in the right spirit; the studio would handle the technical side of things. Sometimes, different lines would be tried to see what sounded better, and if that version ended up being used, the text in the game would have to be changed to match it. English actor David Warner provided the voice for Jon Irenicus; PC Gamer observed that "his commanding portrayal of the arrogant elven mage made Irenicus one of the most memorable villains in RPGs, and is one of the key reasons why Baldur's Gate 2 remains such an arresting experience today".

Michael Hoenig, a German composer who played with Tangerine Dream, composed the game's music. He also composed the music for the first Baldur's Gate.

Baldur's Gate II: Shadows of Amn, Collector's Edition, Bonus Disc
| No. | Title | Length |
|---|---|---|
| 1. | "Main Title" | 2:02 |
| 2. | "Jon Battle and Peace" | 1:41 |
| 3. | "Gaelan Bayle Sailing" | 1:14 |
| 4. | "Asylum Journey" | 2:05 |
| 5. | "Underdark" | 3:00 |
| 6. | "City Gates" | 1:24 |
| 7. | "Trademeet" | 1:00 |
| 8. | "Waukeen's Promenade" | 1:27 |
| 9. | "The Pirate Isle" | 0:56 |
| 10. | "Taverns" | 1:21 |
| 11. | "The Domain of the Dragon" | 3:33 |
| 12. | "Jon Irenicus Encounter Theme" | 2:24 |
| 13. | "The Slums" | 2:15 |
| 14. | "Forest Battle I" | 1:18 |
| 15. | "Forest Battle II" | 1:01 |
| 16. | "Plains Battle I" | 1:13 |
| 17. | "Plains Battle II" | 1:19 |
| 18. | "Mountain Battle I" | 0:58 |
| 19. | "Mountain Battle II" | 1:05 |
| 20. | "City Battle I" | 1:00 |
| 21. | "City Battle II" | 1:07 |
| 22. | "Nighttime in the Docks" | 1:42 |
| 23. | "The Planar Sphere" | 0:45 |
| 24. | "The Druid Grove" | 0:50 |
| 25. | "The Asylum" | 0:58 |
| 26. | "The Dreams" | 2:59 |
| 27. | "Romance I" | 2:03 |
| 28. | "Romance II" | 1:14 |
| 29. | "The Bad" | 1:36 |
| 30. | "The Good" | 1:31 |
| 31. | "Sewer Battle" | 2:17 |
| 32. | "Amongst the Sahuagin" | 1:01 |
| 33. | "Shadow Battle" | 1:03 |

== Release ==
Baldur's Gate II was announced in November 1999. The game went gold on September 14, 2000, and shipped in North America on September 21, and in Europe and Australia on September 29. Also released was a Collector's Edition, which included the game, a cloth map, eight character-trading cards, a Black Isle Studios writing tablet, and an additional CD containing unique armor and weapons as well as music from the soundtrack. A Macintosh version was ported by MumboJumbo and released on October 15, 2001.

=== Expansion pack ===
Baldur's Gate II: Throne of Bhaal, an expansion pack for Shadows of Amn, was developed by BioWare and published by Black Isle Studios, and released in June 2001. Throne of Bhaal takes the protagonist's history further, and, being the final chapter, concludes the Baldur's Gate saga. It also added a variety of features to the base game: a new dungeon called Watcher's Keep, which can be accessed from both Shadows of Amn and Throne of Bhaal; new features and enhancements, such as high-level class abilities, a higher experience point cap, and the Wild Mage character class; and new items and spells. Reviewers generally praised Throne of Bhaal and thought it a spectacular conclusion to the Baldur's Gate saga. It won the "PC Role-Playing" award at the 2002 Interactive Achievement Awards.

=== Re-releases ===
Shadows of Amn was re-released, along with its expansion, Throne of Bhaal, as Baldur's Gate II: The Collection in 2003. In 2004, they were bundled with the original Baldur's Gate and Icewind Dale as Black Isle Compilation Part Two. In 2006, they were re-released with Baldur's Gate and Tales of the Sword Coast as Baldur's Gate: 4 in 1 Boxset. They were also included in The Forgotten Realms Deluxe Edition, Ultimate Dungeons & Dragons, and Dungeons & Dragons Anthology: The Master Collection. In 2010, Baldur's Gate II Complete was released in digital format on GOG.com, including both Shadows of Amn and Throne of Bhaal. Bundled with it are the game manuals in PDF format, high-definition wallpapers, artwork, avatars, and the Shadows of Amn and Throne of Bhaal soundtracks.

=== Enhanced Edition ===
Baldur's Gate II: Enhanced Edition was released in 2013. Developed by Overhaul Games, it is an enhanced version of Baldur's Gate II and uses an updated version of the Infinity Engine. The game was released for PC, iOS, Mac OS X, Linux, and Android. Skybound Games, a division of Skybound Entertainment, brought Baldur's Gate II: Enhanced Edition to the PlayStation 4, Xbox One, and Nintendo Switch in 2019.

== Reception ==
=== Sales ===
In the United States, Baldur's Gate II entered PC Data's computer game sales charts at #5 during the September 17–23 period. It rose to second place the following week, behind The Sims: Livin' Large, while its Collector's Edition captured the seventh position. In its first 14 days, Baldur's Gate II drew in revenues of $4 million across all SKUs in North America, a sales record for an Interplay computer title. The game and its Collector's Edition were ranked 11th and 19th, respectively, on PC Data's monthly chart for September. Entering its third week, the game fell to fifth place on the weekly chart, but it remained in the top 10 throughout the October 5–28 period, and finished seventh for the month. Afterwards, it was absent from PC Data's weekly top 10 and monthly top 20. PC Data reported Baldur's Gate II's sales at 199,914 copies and its revenues at $9.2 million in the United States by the end of 2000. The game's success in the country continued during 2001, when it finished 15th for January and sold another 103,144 units between February and the first week of November alone. It tallied 225,763 domestic sales for the full year, which drew $9.63 million in revenue.

On Media Control's computer game sales rankings for the German market, Baldur's Gate II debuted at #3 in October 2000. It climbed to second place the following month, before dropping to 12th in December. The Verband der Unterhaltungssoftware Deutschland (VUD) presented it with a "Gold" award by the end of 2000, indicating sales of at least 100,000 units across Germany, Austria and Switzerland. Media Control proceeded to rank the game 10th, 17th and 23rd during the first three months of 2001, respectively. In the United Kingdom, Baldur's Gate II claimed #2 for its release month of November 2000, according to Chart-Track. It fell to tenth place in December, and exited the top 10 in January 2001.

The combined global sales of Baldur's Gate, Baldur's Gate: Tales of the Sword Coast, and Baldur's Gate II surpassed 3.5 million copies by March 2001. Baldur's Gate II alone reached almost 1.5 million sales by December 2002, and more than 2 million by November 2005. According to the NPD Group, the game totaled 480,000 sales ($19.6 million) in the United States by August 2006. At that time, Edge declared it the country's 31st-best-selling computer game released since January 2000.

=== Critical reviews ===
Reception

Aggregate scores
| Aggregator | Score |
|---|---|
| GameRankings | 94% |
| Metacritic | 95/100 |

Review scores
| Publication | Score |
|---|---|
| AllGame | 4/5 |
| Computer Gaming World | 5/5 |
| Eurogamer | 9/10 |
| Game Informer | 9.5 |
| GamePro | 5/5 |
| GameSpot | 9.2/10 |
| GameSpy | 92/100 |
| GameZone | 9.5/10 |
| IGN | 9.4/10 |
| Next Generation | 5/5 |
| PC Format | 94% |
| PC Gamer (UK) | 93% |
| PC Gamer (US) | 91% |
| PC Zone | 8.5/10 |
| Computer Games Magazine | 5/5 |
| FiringSquad | 93% |
| Gameplanet | 5/5 |
| RPGamer | 9/10 |

Awards
| Publication | Award |
|---|---|
| Academy of Interactive Arts & Sciences | Character or Story Development (2001) |
| Eurogamer | Best Game (2001), Best Art Direction (2001), Best Male Supporting Character (2001) |
| Game Informer | 88th in the Top 200 Games of All Time (2009) |
| GameSpot | Readers' Choice Game of the Year (2000), Role-Playing Game of the Year (2000), The Greatest Games of All Time |
| GameSpy | RPG Game of the Year (2000) |
| IGN | RPG of 2000, No. 25 in the Top 100 Games of All Time (2005), No. 2 in the Top 25 Modern PC Games (2010) |

Baldur's Gate II received critical acclaim upon its release, and is listed as the eight highest-scoring PC game on the review aggregator Metacritic (as of August 2024). GameSpot's reviewer stated that, while it is a long game, its fine points are what make it so great, and that it was in a class by itself. IGN concluded with a similar sentiment, saying that the game was incomparable and without peers. Though extolling the game immensely and finding only small issues, Computer Gaming World's reviewer noted that he would not trap himself with the "best RPG ever" phrase, but conceded that it "certainly ranks up there with greats like Fallout, Planescape: Torment, and Betrayal at Krondor". Eurogamer lavished much praise upon Baldur's Gate II, and noted that "the story and quests are captivating, the gameplay tried and tested, and the overall feel is professional and entertaining". David Simkins reviewed the PC version of the game for Next Generation, rating it five stars out of five, and wrote that "Baldur's Gate II raises the bar for PC RPGs, elevating the genre to a new level".

GameSpot and IGN felt the game was superior to its predecessor, Baldur's Gate. Computer Games Magazine and Gameplanet noted that it improved upon Baldur's Gate in almost every way. "Polish" or "polished" was a description applied to the game by some reviewers. RPGamer, somewhat more critical of the game than others, concluded: "Maybe it's a bit thin in some areas, but it's still an exemplary game that is well worth the time invested".

Baldur's Gate II's gameplay was called "addicting" by GamePro. RPGamer said that while the game was generally the same as the original Baldur's Gate, the combat was much improved, with less frustration and more strategic options. Computer Gaming World agreed, saying players would put more consideration into designing and implementing combat plans. Eurogamer noted that the interface was "incredibly easy to use". IGN's reviewer observed that many a time the game posed tough decisions that made him think, and also praised the clarity of the quests and ease of moving from one goal to the next. Some reviewers, however, felt the non-player characters in the game were not as powerful as player-made characters. GameSpy said the game is much more difficult than Baldur's Gate and requires more strategy and planning than the original does. GameSpot felt the opening level of the game fell flat, but that it got much better once the player reached Athkatla. IGN noted that the introductory section of the game, while good, was nowhere near as fun as the adventures in Athkatla.

The game's plot was met positively by most reviewers, GameSpy calling it "epic" and GameSpot a "great story". Eurogamer felt the story quite outdid the original. Computer Gaming World, too, observed that it was much improved, adding that the plot style was reminiscent of The Lord of the Rings. He felt the story was somewhere between Planescape: Torment and Icewind Dale in terms of depth. ]RPGamer's reviewer, on the other hand, felt that the plot was lackluster, but approved of the side quests, which, he said, could turn into "minor epics" of their own.

The game's graphics were well received. GamePro praised them, saying that "the backdrops are stunning and the spell effects are impressive". IGN echoed this statement, calling the difference between Baldur's Gate and Shadows of Amn "like looking at a still oil painting, and then turning to see the scene in living motion on a big screen TV". Eurogamer, too, commended the artwork. GameSpot thought both the pre-rendered backgrounds and the animations for characters and monsters were well done. FiringSquad said the game's artwork surpassed that of Planescape: Torment, and called the background artwork "fantastic". The voice acting of Baldur's Gate II was also praised by FiringSquad, who said that "characters sound alive and vivacious (or depressed, crazy—whatever suits them)" and that the quality of the voices drew the player more deeply into the game. IGN called the voice acting "outstanding" and said the variety of personalities would cause players to become "attached" to the characters, only noting with disapproval the dearth of new voices for the player's protagonist. Reviewers generally found the game's music to be well-done, but RPGamer felt it was "inoffensive but unimpressive".

Gameplanet criticized the game's poor support for online multiplayer, saying it was "unstable and quite frustrating". FiringSquad felt that the lack of communication between players in combat during online games was problematic, but that local area network play would be more satisfying. PC Zone said that multiplayer was as unimpressive as it had been in the first game of the series and that the game needed multiplayer maps. IGN, however, felt that multiplayer play was solidly implemented and fun. Pathfinding was sometimes criticized. Criticism was also directed at bugs in the game, such as frequent crashes when trying to access certain locations. According to GameSpy, Baldur's Gate II is "not 100% stable". GameSpot noted that the game's loading times were somewhat long and that the game crashed on occasion, but said that these problems are not significant. IGN, though noting that the game slowed down during combat when a lot of animations were happening simultaneously because of spells or "dazzling backgrounds", said that there were almost no other technical problems. GameSpot also felt that the small number of character portraits to choose from was a disappointment and was displeased that the game reused special effects, audio, and graphics from the first game.

GameSpot later called Baldur's Gate II "a towering achievement in the history of role-playing games". In a 2007 Gamasutra article on the "Platinum and Modern Ages" of computer role-playing games (CRPGs), Matt Barton noted contemporary reviewers' universal praise for the game, and called it "the finest CRPG ever designed". According to GameSpy, "this is easily one of the finest CRPGs ever made and an experience that no RPG fan should miss".

=== Awards ===
Baldur's Gate II has been honored many times. GameSpot, GameSpy, and IGN awarded it their "Role-Playing Game of the Year" awards in 2000, and it won GameSpot's Readers' Choice Game of the Year award for that year. It received three "Gaming Globe" awards from Eurogamer in 2001: Best Game, Best Art Direction, and Best Male Supporting Character (for Minsc). The Academy of Interactive Arts & Sciences honored Shadows of Amn with the "Character or Story Development" award at the 4th Annual Interactive Achievement Awards; the game also received nominations for the "Game of the Year", "PC Game of the Year", "PC Role-Playing", and "Game Play Engineering" categories. IGN placed it at No. 25 on their 2005 "Top 100 Games of All Time" list. In 2006, though not ranking in the top five games, it earned an "honorable mention" in Gamasutra's Quantum Leap Awards. Baldur's Gate II was inducted into GameSpot's "Greatest Games of All Time" list. In 2009, Game Informer placed Baldur's Gate II at No. 88 on their list of "The Top 200 Games of All Time", calling it "the best Dungeons & Dragons game ever made". This is up one place from their top 100 list in 2001. Empire ranked it No. 19 on their list of the 100 Greatest Games. At the end of 2009, Baldur's Gate II, though not quite making the Top 12 list, received an honorable mention in Gamasutra's Game of the Decade, where readers voted for their best game of the 2000s.

In 2010, on IGN's Top 25 Modern PC Games, Baldur's Gate II clocked in at No. 2. In 2013, it was placed at No. 46 on GamingBolt's "Top 100 greatest video games ever made". IGN ranked Baldur's Gate II No. 1 on their list of "The Top 11 Dungeons & Dragons Games of All Time" in 2014. Ian Williams of Paste rated the game No. 2 on his list of "The 10 Greatest Dungeons and Dragons Videogames" in 2015. IGN ranked Baldur's Gate II No. 3 on their "Top 100 RPGs of All Time" list. In 2016, PC Gamer noted the game on their "best RPGs of all time". It was placed at No. 9 on Game Informer's "Top 100 RPGs Of All Time" list, and was included among PCGamesN's "best RPGs on PC" as well.

== Novel ==
There is a novelization of the game by Philip Athans. Published in 2000 by Wizards of the Coast, it focuses solely on Abdel, the last of the Bhaalspawn. The novel is the second in the series; the first, also by Athans, is a novelization of Baldur's Gate, and the third, by Drew Karpyshyn, of the Throne of Bhaal expansion.

== See also ==
- List of Dungeons & Dragons video games
