= Black Isle Studios =

American game developer

- Company type: Subsidiary
- Industry: Video games
- Founded: 1996; 30 years ago
- Founder: Feargus Urquhart
- Successor: Obsidian Entertainment
- Headquarters: Irvine, California, U.S.
- Key people: Feargus Urquhart, Chris Avellone, Josh Sawyer, Darren Monahan, Chris Parker
- Parent: Interplay Entertainment
- Website: www.blackisle.com at the Wayback Machine (archived November 5, 2014) (Note: Additional archives: Last live version after 2003 shutdown at the Wayback Machine (archived April 5, 2004), Revival Announcement at the Wayback Machine (archived September 19, 2012))

Black Isle Studios is a division of the developer and publisher Interplay Entertainment formed in 1996 that develops role-playing video games. It has published several games from other developers.

Black Isle is based in Irvine, California. The idea for the division's name came from the Black Isle in Scotland – founder Feargus Urquhart's ancestral country. Black Isle Studios is most famous for its work on the Fallout series as well as the critically acclaimed Planescape: Torment. They achieved success with the Icewind Dale and Baldur's Gate series of role-playing video games, though it only published the Baldur's Gate series. In 1999, IGN's RPG Vault gave it the award for a Developer of the Year. The company was closed in late 2003 due to Interplay's financial troubles.

Interplay briefly revived the Black Isle name in August 2012 with the intention of producing new role-playing games under that label. Black Isle Studios released Baldur's Gate: Dark Alliance remastered in May 2021.

== History ==
Created in 1996 by Feargus Urquhart, the studio was named Black Isle after Urquhart's homeland. The studio, although credited for the creation of Fallout was, in fact, not responsible for the game. Rather a key portion of the original studio came from the team that made Fallout. When developing Fallout 2, several employees left Interplay to form Troika Games after they "were unable to come to an agreement with Interplay as to how [their] next team should be structured." The remaining team would go on to release such critically acclaimed games as Planescape: Torment, and Icewind Dale. The studio also released critically acclaimed Baldur's Gate and Baldur's Gate II: Shadows of Amn developed by BioWare.

In the years leading to the closure of Black Isle, Interplay's financial difficulties would worsen, leading to the cancellation of anticipated games such as Black Isle's Torn and Stonekeep 2: Godmaker, releasing only Icewind Dale II, publishing Lionheart: Legacy of the Crusader and developing Baldur's Gate: Dark Alliance II. On December 8, 2003, in the midst of serious financial difficulties, Interplay laid off the entire Black Isle Studios staff, which also resulted in the cancellation of Baldur's Gate III: The Black Hound, Baldur's Gate: Dark Alliance III and the original Fallout 3.

In 2012, Interplay had been trying for several years to get the troubled Project V13 off the ground. Originally conceived as a massively multiplayer online game set in the world of Fallout, the project suffered a significant setback when Interplay lost all rights to use the Fallout brand. As part of their efforts to restart the project anew, Interplay revived Black Isle Studios with two of its original team members and began a crowdfunding campaign to fund a prototype in 2012. The campaign did not raise sufficient funds to develop a playable prototype, and communications from Interplay and Black Isle about the project had ceased completely by early 2014.

== Games ==
=== Developed ===
- Fallout (1997)
- Fallout 2 (1998)
- Planescape: Torment (1999)
- Icewind Dale (2000)
- Icewind Dale: Heart of Winter (2001)
- Icewind Dale: Heart of Winter – Trials of the Luremaster (2001)
- Icewind Dale II (2002)
- Baldur's Gate: Dark Alliance II (2004)

=== Published ===
- Baldur's Gate (1998)
- Baldur's Gate: Tales of the Sword Coast (1999)
- Baldur's Gate II: Shadows of Amn (2000)
- Baldur's Gate II: Throne of Bhaal (2001)
- Baldur's Gate: Dark Alliance (2001)
- Lionheart: Legacy of the Crusader (2003)

=== Compilations ===
Two compilations bearing its name were also released:

- Black Isle Compilation (2002)
- Black Isle Compilation Part Two (2004)

=== Cancelled ===
Cancelled projects include:

- Stonekeep 2: Godmaker (2001)
- Torn (2001)
- Van Buren (2003)
- Baldur's Gate III: The Black Hound (2003)
- Baldur's Gate: Dark Alliance III (2004)
- Project V13 (2012)
