= Beamdog =

Canadian video game developer

IdeaSpark Labs Inc.
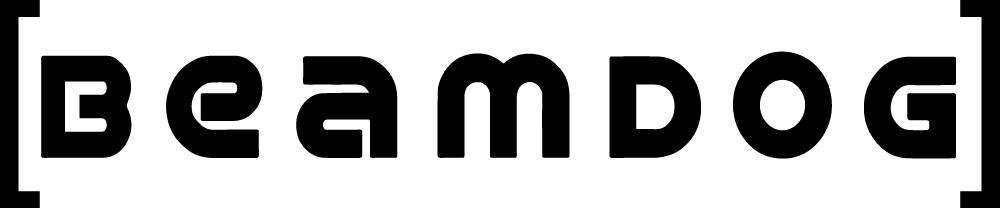
- Trade name: Beamdog
- Type: Subsidiary
- Industry: Video games
- Founded: 2009; 17 years ago
- Founders: Trent Oster; Cameron Tofer
- Headquarters: Edmonton, Canada
- Parent: Aspyr (2022–present)
- Divisions: Overhaul Games
- Website: beamdog.com

IdeaSpark Labs Inc. (trade name: Beamdog) is a Canadian video game developer founded in 2009 by BioWare co-founder Trent Oster and former BioWare lead programmer Cameron Tofer. Beamdog's distribution service was launched in July 2010.

== History ==
Beamdog was founded in 2009 by Trent Oster and Cameron Tofer. It has employees in locations throughout the United States and Australia, Russia, and the UK. Beamdog initially operated as a third party digital distribution storefront for PC games by independent developers.

Overhaul Games is a division of Beamdog. Originally, it was a part of Beamdog, but following the release of MDK2 for Wii, a discrete studio was founded to work on MDK2 HD. The name Overhaul Games was chosen to reflect the company's work on MDK2 HD as they had overhauled the game into a next generation game. Since 2012, the Overhaul team has also released several enhanced editions of Infinity Engine games as well.

Aspyr through its parent Embracer Group announced its acquisition of Beamdog in April 2022 for an undisclosed sum.

== Games ==
- MDK2 (2011) – Wii port developed by Beamdog, published by Interplay
- MDK2 HD (2012) – Developed by Overhaul Games, published by Interplay
- Baldur's Gate: Enhanced Edition (2012) – Developed by Overhaul Games, published by Beamdog
- Baldur's Gate II: Enhanced Edition (2013) – Developed by Overhaul Games, published by Beamdog
- Icewind Dale: Enhanced Edition (2014) – Developed by Overhaul Games, published by Beamdog
- Baldur's Gate: Siege of Dragonspear (2016) – Developed and published by Beamdog
- Planescape: Torment: Enhanced Edition (2017) – Developed by Overhaul Games, published by Beamdog
- Neverwinter Nights: Enhanced Edition (2018) – Developed and published by Beamdog
- Axis & Allies 1942 Online (2021) – Developed and published by Beamdog
- Mythforce (2023) – Developed by Beamdog, published by Aspyr

In addition, Beamdog offers official soundtracks to games for download as well as "digital deluxe" versions with the original and additional music included. The Siege of Dragonspear is also available in a collectors edition as well.

== Beamdog Client ==
Beamdog Client is an online-based game software program (similar to Steam), which allows players to keep their games up to date with the latest fixes and enhancements. It also allows players access to the latest content from Beamdog, as well as a forum for testing or providing game feedback.
