= Characters of Baldur's Gate II =

Fictional characters in Baldur's Gate II and its expansions

An art print montage of character portraits created for the 2000 video game Baldur's Gate II and its expansion Throne of Bhaal composed by former BioWare portrait artist Mike Sass. First row: Aerie, Korgan Bloodaxe, Minsc and Boo, Nalia de'Arnise, Yoshimo, and Mazzy Fentan. Second row: Keldorn Firecam, Haer'Dalis, Cernd, Viconia DeVir, Edwin Odesseiron, and a male half-orc player character. Third row: Imoen, Anomen Delryn, Jaheira, Valygar Corthala, Jan Jansen, and Sarevok.

The characters of Baldur's Gate II appear in the 2000 Dungeons & Dragons role-playing video game Baldur's Gate II: Shadows of Amn, its 2001 expansion Baldur's Gate II: Throne of Bhaal, and its 2013 remaster Baldur's Gate II: Enhanced Edition. Set in the Forgotten Realms fantasy world, the games follow a player-created protagonist who is a Bhaalspawn, a child of the dead god Bhaal. In Shadows of Amn, the protagonist assembles a party of adventurers in order to pursue the villainous Jon Irenicus through Athkatla, the capital city of Amn, while dealing with various competing factions and organizations along the way. In Throne of Bhaal, the protagonist travels through the neighbouring country of Tethyr and comes into conflict with several other Bhaalspawn.

Shadows of Amn has sixteen recruitable companions, including the returning Imoen, Jaheira, Minsc, Edwin Odesseiron and Viconia DeVir from the first Baldur's Gate. BioWare developed a smaller cast for Shadows of Amn compared to its predecessor, giving the companions more dialogue, personal quests and relationships with one another. Four of these companions could become romantic partners for the protagonist. Throne of Bhaal adds Sarevok, the principal antagonist of the first game as a recruitable companion. The story was also adapted into novels by Philip Athans and Drew Karpyshyn, which replace the customizable protagonist with an authored character named Abdel Adrian. Enhanced Edition continues the stories of Neera, Dorn Il-Khan and Rasaad yn Bashir from Baldur's Gate: Enhanced Edition, and introduces Hexxat and Wilson, for a total of five additional recruitable companions.

Reviewers praised the companions' personalities and interactions, although later criticism has also examined the limitations of their apparent independence and the treatment of romance as a series of prescribed choices. Retrospectives published by several video game media outlets have identified the cast of Baldur's Gate II as an influence on the companion writing in BioWare's later games.

== Concept and development ==
Following the first Baldur's Gate, BioWare sought to place greater emphasis on the relationships between party members. Producer Ray Muzyka outlined an ambitious feature list for the sequel that included character relationships comparable to those in the Final Fantasy series. BioWare consequently reduced the number of companions and expanded their histories, motivations and interactions. Several characters who appear in Baldur's Gate II originated in tabletop Dungeons & Dragons sessions held by lead designer James Ohlen. Most of these characters originated as player characters from two D&D campaigns run by Ohlen — Forgotten Realms and a Dark Sun/Planescape sequel — who were adapted for the video game while retaining their original names.

According to writer David Gaider, Ohlen outlined the main events of quests and reviewed the writers' work, while allowing more freedom in optional stories. The team sought to give companions complete character arcs rather than only distinctive personalities. Much of the dialogue is presented as text, with selected passages voiced. Writer Lukas Kristjanson recalled the project's scale through Jaheira's dialogue, which he thought exceeded that of the first game's companions combined.

The decision to include companion romances was also influenced by Final Fantasy VII. Oster recalled that Ohlen was impressed by its character interaction and romance, while David Gaider said that Ohlen subsequently assigned him to develop romances for Baldur's Gate II despite Gaider's initial reluctance to write them. BioWare initially planned six romances, divided equally between male and female companions. Planned romances for Valygar and Haer'Dalis were cut amid uncertainty about the feature and difficulties completing the existing relationships. The original game allows male protagonists to romance Aerie, Jaheira or Viconia and female protagonists to romance Anomen, subject to additional restrictions. The relationships progress through conversations and can end in response to the player's choices. Gaider recalled that the writers approached these as additional character stories and were surprised by their popularity after release. Throne of Bhaal continues these romantic storylines.

The game represents party members through portraits and animated sprites. Portraits appear in dialogue, character records and the party interface; the smaller figures used during play share designs according to race and character class, with variations in colouring and equipment. Pre-release coverage showed revised portraits for Imoen, Minsc and Jaheira and reported that their original actors returned to record new dialogue.

Baldur's Gate II: Enhanced Edition, developed by Overhaul Games, features Neera, Dorn and Rasaad who return from Baldur's Gate: Enhanced Edition, while the vampire thief Hexxat and the grizzly bear Wilson are introduced as new recruitable companions. The additional humanoid companions have personal storylines and romances extending into Throne of Bhaal.

== Characters ==
The games take place in the Forgotten Realms, principally in the nations of Amn and Tethyr in the continent of Faerun. The original game offers sixteen recruitable companions, with Sarevok added in Throne of Bhaal. In the standard single-player campaign, the player character is the former Ward of the mage Gorion, and can recruit up to five companions at a time. Companions participate in quests and conversations, and respond to the party's conduct according to their personalities and moral alignments. Their disagreements can lead to departures or infighting within the party.

The protagonist's name, gender, race and class are chosen by the player. Raised by the Harper member Gorion in the library fortress Candlekeep, Gorion's Ward discovers in the first Baldur's Gate that they are one of the Bhaalspawn, mortal children of the god of murder. After defeating their half-brother Sarevok, Gorion's Ward and their companions are captured by Irenicus. The opening of Shadows of Amn establishes connections to the first game's cast through Imoen, Jaheira and Minsc, but also introduces their losses: Imoen and the protagonist have been tortured, Minsc's companion Dynaheir has been killed, and the party later discovers the desecrated body of Jaheira's husband Khalid. Their shared grief and anger becomes motivation for pursuing Irenicus.

The search for Irenicus initially concerns the rescue of Imoen, but later becomes a struggle to recover the protagonist's own stolen soul. In Throne of Bhaal, the protagonist confronts rival Bhaalspawn and ultimately chooses between remaining mortal and becoming a deity.

=== Returning companions ===
==== Imoen ====
Imoen is a thief and mage, the protagonist's childhood friend and foster sister. After escaping from Irenicus's lair, she is arrested along with Irenicus by the Cowled Wizards, an organisation of magic-users empowered to regulate the use of wizardly magic by the people in Athkatla, after battling her tormentor with magical spells. She is taken along with Irenicus to Spellhold, an asylum for magic-users; there, Irenicus reveals that she is also a Bhaalspawn and steals her soul for his sister Bodhi. Imoen can rejoin the protagonist after their escape, and her soul is recovered by defeating Bodhi.

Imoen's expanded importance in the sequel grew partly from circumstances surrounding her creation for the first Baldur's Gate. Kristjanson recalled that she was added late in development to provide a non-evil aligned thief early in the campaign. With the voice-recording budget exhausted, he constructed her dialogue from recordings originally made for a discarded guard character named Pique. The resulting character had no independent confrontations or conversations with other companions, which Kristjanson believed inadvertently made her relationship with the player appear unusually close. Her unexpected popularity contributed to BioWare's decision to make her the protagonist's half-sister and a central character in Baldur's Gate II.

Contemporary and later writers particularly noted the change in Imoen between the two games. Steven Bellotti of RPGamer contrasted the "sprightly little sister" characterization of the original game with the darker and more brooding personality she displays in the sequel. Paul Dean of PC Gamer similarly singled Imoen out when discussing the sequel's treatment of its returning cast, describing the formerly cheerful character as exhibiting signs of post-traumatic stress after her imprisonment and torture. For the Polish localization, Linguist Bartosz Kossakowski examined her changed presentation from the youthful pronunciation of the original performance in the first game to her more conventional speech in the sequel, suggesting that the change complemented her more serious characterization.

==== Jaheira ====
Jaheira is a half-elven fighter and druid, a member of the Harpers and a friend of Gorion. She accompanies the protagonist after Khalid's death, while her personal quest brings her into conflict with other Harpers over her loyalty to the Bhaalspawn. She is a possible romantic partner for a male protagonist, with conversations that address her grief for Khalid.

Kristjanson combined Jaheira's personal quest with her romance arc, allowing developments in one to affect the other. The resulting dialogue and timing conditions were difficult to implement and overwhelmed the team's conversation-visualization tool, Dotty.

==== Minsc ====
Minsc is a ranger from Rashemen who travels with Boo, a hamster he describes as a miniature giant space hamster. He had acted as the bodyguard of the witch Dynaheir, whose death during the party's captivity leaves him determined to oppose Irenicus. His dialogue combines extravagant threats against evil with affection for Boo and loyalty to his companions.

==== Edwin Odesseiron ====
Edwin is an arrogant human mage associated with the Red Wizards of Thay. In Shadows of Amn, he works for the thieves' guild leader Mae'Var and can join the protagonist during their dealings with the guild. He pursues a Nether Scroll in the hope of increasing his magical power, but its use temporarily transforms him into a woman. His antagonism towards other companions can provoke conflicts within the party.

==== Viconia DeVir ====
Viconia is a drow elf and cleric of Shar who has left the Underdark and the worship of Lolth. The protagonist can rescue her from a mob preparing to burn her in Athkatla. She is suspicious of surface-dwellers after repeated persecution, but can become a romantic partner for a male protagonist. Gaider described using the femme fatale archetype when writing Viconia's romance, in contrast to his approach to Aerie.

=== Companions introduced in Shadows of Amn ===
==== Aerie ====
Aerie is an avariel, an elven subspecies that possess wings. Captured by slavers when young, she was exhibited in a circus until confinement damaged her wings, which were amputated after becoming infected. She was eventually rescued and restored to health by Quayle, a gnome and potential companion in Baldur's Gate. She joins the protagonist after being rescued from an illusion affecting the circus in Athkatla.

Aerie is relatively young and inexperienced during the events of Baldur's Gate II, and her conversations concern the loss of her wings and her uncertainty about life outside the circus. She is a potential love interest for a male player character in Shadows of Amn; if the romance continues into the Throne of Bhaal, she will eventually bear the player character's child. Gaider described her romance as an adaptation of the damsel in distress archetype. Alternatively, she can form a relationship with Haer'Dalis.

==== Anomen Delryn ====
Anomen is a human fighter and cleric of Helm seeking knighthood in the Most Noble Order of the Radiant Heart. His boastfulness conceals insecurity about his abilities and his relationship with his father. After his sister is killed, the protagonist can influence whether he pursues revenge or leaves the matter to the authorities, affecting his admission to the order and subsequent behaviour. He is the original game's only romance option for a female protagonist.

Gaider wrote Anomen's romance after another writer had established his abrasive personality. He recalled having to find a convincing romantic story for a character he initially considered an unlikely choice.

==== Cernd ====
Cernd is a human druid capable of transforming into a werewolf. He investigates the animal attacks on Trademeet and can help the protagonist challenge the leadership of a nearby druid grove. His personal quest concerns the family he left behind: he discovers that his former wife has died and seeks to recover their son from the abusive nobleman she subsequently lived with.

==== Haer'Dalis ====
Haer'Dalis is a tiefling bard and actor from Sigil, a city connected to other planes of existence. He belongs to a travelling theatrical troupe and the Doomguard, whose beliefs centre on the eventual decay of all things. The protagonist encounters him while helping the troupe. He speaks in theatrical and avian metaphors and may become romantically involved with Aerie, creating a rivalry with a protagonist courting her.

==== Jan Jansen ====
Jan Jansen is an eccentric gnome illusionist and inventor of multiple gadgets which only he knows how to use. He is a recruitable companion in Shadows of Amn; he is encountered peddling his wares in the city of Amn, which in actuality are dangerous weapons in their own right. His conversations frequently digress into implausible stories about his relatives, turnips and inventions. His personal quest concerns Lissa, a former lover, who asks for help when her daughter becomes seriously ill.

==== Keldorn Firecam ====
Keldorn is a veteran human paladin of Torm and a member of the Order of the Radiant Heart. He joins the protagonist during an investigation into the Cult of the Unseeing Eye. His devotion to duty has estranged him from his wife and children. The protagonist can encourage reconciliation, allowing him to leave adventuring and return to his family.

==== Korgan Bloodaxe ====
Korgan is a violent, mercenary dwarven berserker who seeks help recovering the Book of Kaza from an Athkatlan tomb. His former adventuring companions have become his enemies. Despite his hostility towards more idealistic party members, his exchanges with Mazzy include attempts to court her and accommodate her disapproval.

==== Mazzy Fentan ====
Mazzy is a halfling fighter and follower of Arvoreen, the halfling god of war. Rescued from imprisonment after her adventuring party is defeated, she remains committed to defending others. She resents assumptions that halflings lack courage and aspires to be a paladin, a class unavailable to her under the game's rules.

==== Nalia de'Arnise ====
Nalia is a human noblewoman trained as a thief and mage. She seeks help defending her family keep against a troll invasion. Although concerned with the treatment of poorer people, she often understands their lives through the assumptions of her privileged upbringing. Her subsequent quest concerns the efforts of her intended husband, Isaea Roenall, to force their marriage.

==== Valygar Corthala ====
Valygar is a human ranger who distrusts magic because of its destructive influence on his family. The Cowled Wizards pursue him because his blood can open the Planar Sphere, a magical vessel associated with his ancestor Lavok. The protagonist can help him investigate the sphere.

Gaider recalled Valygar as the first companion he wrote, developing his conversations and personal story around Ohlen's outline for the Planar Sphere quest.

==== Yoshimo ====
Yoshimo is a bounty hunter rogue from Kara-Tur encountered by the party while escaping Irenicus's dungeon early in Shadows of Amn. If taken to Spellhold, where Irenicus and Imoen are incarcerated by the Cowled Wizards, Yoshimo reveals that his affable manner conceals his service to Irenicus all along, and that his purpose is to betray the protagonist as part of Irenicus' contingency plan. He dies in battle with the party regardless of the player character's choices as he is compelled under a magical geas to betray the protagonist at the direction of Irenicus. After the resulting confrontation, the protagonist can take his heart to a temple of Ilmater to seek forgiveness for his soul.

Yoshimo is the only Shadows of Amn companion who is not available for the player character to recruit in Throne of Bhaal.

=== Antagonists and supporting characters ===
==== Jon Irenicus ====
Jon Irenicus is the principal antagonist of Shadows of Amn. Formerly the elf Joneleth, he tried to seize the power of Suldanessellar's sacred Tree of Life. He and his sister Bodhi were exiled and stripped of their elven souls. His former relationship with Suldanessellar's queen, Ellesime, forms part of the explanation for his fall. Irenicus experiments on the Bhaalspawn and steals the protagonist's soul before returning to attack Suldanessellar. The struggle against Irenicus ironically brings the protagonist closer to the divine power the villain sought for himself.

==== Bodhi ====
Bodhi is Irenicus's sister and a vampire who leads a guild competing with the Shadow Thieves in Athkatla. She offers the protagonist an alternative alliance in the effort to reach Spellhold, while secretly assisting her brother. Irenicus gives her Imoen's stolen soul, which the party must recover by defeating her.

==== Ellesime ====
Ellesime is the queen of Suldanessellar and Irenicus's former lover. She explains his attempt to seize the Tree of Life's power and the punishment imposed on him and Bodhi. After the party saves the city, she honours its members and mourns the person Joneleth had been before becoming Irenicus.

==== Other supporting characters ====
- Firkraag is a red dragon who resides in Windspear Hills, a mountainous region near the eastern coast of Amn. He also takes humanoid form and masquerades as a human noble.
- The Shadow Thieves are a secretive and powerful consortium of thieves based in Amn. The local Shadow Thief guild leader in Athkatla is Aran Linvail. Gaelan Bayle serves as an intermediary to the protagonist and helps to arrange passage to Spellhold in return for assistance against Bodhi.
- Saemon Havarian is a flamboyant opportunistic sea captain who is tasked with taking Gorion's Ward to Spellhold and later appears in Amkethran in Throne of Bhaal.
- Adalon is a silver dragon who resides in her lair in the Underdark. After the drow of the nearby city of Ust Natha stole her eggs, she disguises the party as drow so that they can recover her eggs on her behalf.
- Solaufein is the Commander of the Male Fighters Society in Ust Natha, who secretly worships Eilistraee, the sole good-aligned deity of the drow pantheon.
- Elhan is the commander of the elven defenders inside the invaded city of Suldanessellar. He directs the protagonist to recover the Rhynn Lanthorn.
- Elminster makes a few cameo appearances, where Elminster assumes a disguise and goes under the anagram of "Terminsel".
- Drizzt Do'Urden and his adventuring companions can be persuaded to help attack Bodhi's lair.

=== Throne of Bhaal ===
==== Sarevok ====
Sarevok is the protagonist's Bhaalspawn half-brother and the principal antagonist of the first game. His spirit appears in an extradimensional Pocket Plane accessible to the protagonist and offers assistance in exchange for his resurrection. Either the protagonist or Imoen can supply the essence needed to restore him, after which he can join the party as a fighter. Conversations with the protagonist may lead him to reconsider his earlier beliefs and change his alignment.

==== The Five ====
The Five is a coalition of powerful Bhaalspawn comprises Illasera, an elven warrior mage; Yaga-Shura, a fire giant; Sendai, a drow priestess; Abazigal, a blue dragon aided by his half-dragon son Draconis; and Balthazar, a monk. Their destruction of other Bhaalspawn drives the conflict in the narrative of Throne of Bhaal.

==== Melissan ====
Melissan presents herself as a protector of Bhaalspawn threatened by the Five and claims to watch over the Bhaalspawn taking refuge in the Tethyrian city of Saradush, which is ruled by the half-orc Bhaalspawn warlord Gromnir. Melissan is eventually revealed as Amelyssan the Blackhearted, Bhaal's former high priestess, who has manipulated the conflict between the various Bhaalspawn to collect their divine essence once they are dead. The protagonist confronts her at Bhaal's throne before deciding what to do with the accumulated power.

==== Other supporting characters ====
In the Pocket Plane, the protagonist is aided by Cespenar, a timid imp who once served as Bhaal's former butler and can assist the protagonist with enchanting items. The Solar, a celestial being who periodically appears to guide the protagonist, occasionally shares insight about their past and destiny.

=== Enhanced Edition companions ===
==== Neera ====
Neera is a half-elven wild mage whose spells can produce unpredictable effects. She helps establish a refuge for other wild mages hunted by the Red Wizards of Thay. Her quests concern the defence of the refuge and the effort to rescue its inhabitants after an attack. She can become a romantic partner for a male protagonist.

==== Dorn Il-Khan ====
Dorn is a half-orc blackguard who serves the patron Ur-Gothoz. Having taken revenge on the companions who betrayed him before the events of the game, he continues to commit killings at his patron's command, while becoming dissatisfied with his service. His storyline can involve challenging that relationship, and he is a romance option for protagonists of either gender.

==== Rasaad yn Bashir ====
Rasaad is a human monk devoted to the moon goddess Selûne. He blames the cult leader Alorgoth for corrupting his brother Gamaz, whom Rasaad killed, and pursues revenge despite the strain it places on his faith. He can become a romantic partner for a female protagonist.

==== Hexxat ====
Hexxat is a vampire thief who uses a human woman, Clara, to draw the protagonist into freeing her from a tomb. Clara initially presents herself as Hexxat; the real Hexxat becomes available as a companion after being released. Her quests involve obtaining relics for a mysterious employer and seeking a return to mortality. She is a romance option for female protagonists.

==== Wilson ====
Wilson is a grizzly bear captured by the trapper Jolstead. The protagonist can release and recruit him near the Twofold Temple. His characterization contrasts his strength and size with a gentle disposition.

== Novelizations ==
Philip Athans adapted Shadows of Amn in a 2000 novel, the sequel to his 1999 novelization of the first Baldur's Gate. This is followed by Drew Karpyshyn's Throne of Bhaal novelization in 2001. The novels follow Abdel Adrian, a male human fighter who replaces the game's customizable character as the defined protagonist of the Bhaalspawn saga. Murder in Baldur's Gate adapts and continues the storyline from the Baldur's Gate novels, which sees Abdel returning to the city of Baldur's Gate and joining the ruling Council of Four in his later years.

Discussing the adaptations, Athans said he had received brief character descriptions and a branching story outline in an Excel spreadsheet, rather than the completed game. He created a protagonist and selected a route through that outline. Communication passed through Interplay, and he recalled receiving no feedback from BioWare. Athans identified a difficulty in adapting role-playing games: their characters and unresolved situations can support different players' stories, whereas a novel requires a particular cast and ending.

== Reception and analysis ==
Contemporary reviews praised the increased interaction between party members. In his review, Greg Kasavin of GameSpot considered the spoken dialogue an important part of establishing the personalities of major characters. Kasavin found that their conversations and interjections created camaraderie and encouraged replaying the game to learn about companions omitted from an earlier party. Bellotti likewise welcomed the friendships, quarrels, romances and quests through which the player could influence the characters. He nevertheless criticized some of the writing and exaggerated vocal performances, particularly during lengthy dramatic speeches.

Later assessments continued to emphasize attachment to the cast of characters. Game Informer writer Kimberley Wallace praised Jaheira's confidence, decisiveness and concern for the protagonist when selecting her among BioWare's best characters. Wallace likewise highlighted the contrast between Minsc's eccentric behaviour and his sincere wish to be a hero. PC Gamer's Andy Chalk compared the party to a tabletop group whose members had interests beyond the protagonist's immediate goals. He regarded the companions as central to the game's appeal; he found Yoshimo's loss in particular to be affecting even with advance knowledge of the betrayal, because the time spent travelling with him had established an attachment to the character. Robert Zak identified personal trauma as a recurring subject in their stories.

Author Matt Bell offered a more qualified account of the companions' independence, as their responses often depend on fixed triggers and numerical reputation thresholds, while their personal quests occupy only a small part of a long playthrough He nevertheless argued that the relatively limited visual and psychological detail invites players to supply imagined motives. Decisions made during play can consequently express loyalty to companions even when no explicit reward encourages it.

Some of female companions of Shadows of Amn was discussed by DiGRA in 2015 for its representation of gender, identity and personal agency within the role-playing genre. Each character is written around distinct personal conflicts rather than functioning solely as party roles or romance options. Jaheira's storyline explores grief, responsibility and renewal following the death of her husband Khalid, as she struggles between her duties as a Harper, her desire for justice, and the need to continue living after personal loss. Aerie's arc centres on trauma and recovery after her captivity by slavers and the loss of her wings, with her romance and personal quest focusing on vulnerability, self-worth and adaptation to a changed identity. Viconia's characterisation examines the tension between her identity as a drow exile and the prejudice she experiences on the surface, while also exploring themes of sexuality, autonomy and moral ambiguity. Mazzy provides a different perspective by presenting a halfling fighter who admires the ideals of knighthood and heroism while humorously contrasting those ideals with the limitations imposed by her race and social position. Together, these characters illustrate the game's broader approach to companion writing, where personal histories, relationships and moral choices are integrated into the player's role-playing experience.

=== Relationships and themes ===
Bell used Imoen's treatment to illustrate a wider tension between Baldur's Gate II's narrative characterization and its role-playing systems. Noting her importance to the narrative, Bell observed that Irenicus's description of a "god-child" during his confrontation with Imoen outside his dungeon initially appears to refer to the protagonist, but can be read on a later playthrough as foreshadowing the revelation that Imoen is herself a Bhaalspawn. He noted that the game presents her as psychologically affected by Irenicus's torture, and interpreted a conversation with Irenicus's captive dryads as suggesting that she may also have been sexually abused; Bell criticized the game for raising the implication without subsequently allowing the player to acknowledge or explore it. He contrasted the lasting narrative significance of these experiences with game mechanics in which Imoen retains her normal abilities, health and status, arguing that the system has no equivalent for persistent psychological trauma. Bell also identified other instances of tension between the story's treatment of suffering and the game's systems. The deaths of Khalid and Dynaheir are irreversible, whereas other party members can often be resurrected. Similarly, the freedom to pursue optional adventures at the player's own pace undermines the apparent urgency of rescuing Imoen from Spellhold.

Bell described the romances as conversational puzzles in which players learn the responses needed to maintain a relationship. He contrasted their emotional effect with their limited consequences: after choosing Jaheira over Aerie, he felt guilty, although Aerie remained in the party and the game offered little opportunity to discuss the rejection further. For Bell, the player supplied feelings and consequences beyond those represented by the relationship scripts. Chalk recalled the romantic interactions with Viconia to be unusually involving feature when extended companion romances were still unfamiliar in computer role-playing games. In a study of the romance with Anomen, games scholar Magdalena Bednorz argued that its dialogue and rules adapt the conventions of courtly love. The female protagonist must repeatedly reassure Anomen, tolerate his anger and help resolve his moral dilemmas. Bednorz interpreted the choices that preserve or terminate the romance, and the waiting periods between conversations, as reinforcing expectations of feminine patience and unequal emotional work in heterosexual relationships.

Games scholar Steven Holmes examined Edwin's transformation into "Edwina" as part of BioWare's early treatment of gender and sexuality. Holmes argued that the transformation is framed principally as comic relief, with dialogue choices inviting the player to mock or sexualize the character, and contrasted this treatment with the more sympathetic queer representation in BioWare's later games.

=== Expansions ===
In his review of Throne of Bhaal, Kasavin praised the voice acting and the reactions of other characters to the protagonist's growing power. He found, however, that conversations sometimes explained the plot at the expense of the speakers' personalities and motivations. Kasavin also praised Sarevok as a strong addition to the cast of Throne of Bhaal. Bellotti welcomed the continuation of romances and other companion stories, but thought there was too little dialogue within the party. He singled out Jaheira's reduced participation and found Minsc's repeated jokes less effective.

Reviewers differed over the Enhanced Edition additions. Patrick Hancock of Destructoid found that Hexxat fitted the setting, although her material could be skipped without a significant loss to the main experience. Brett Todd of GameSpot considered some new dialogue too modern and self-referential alongside the original cast. He found Hexxat's background intriguing, while noting the limitations her evil alignment placed on fitting her into some parties.

== Legacy ==
Joshua Wolens of PC Gamer argued that Baldur's Gate II established a pattern that continued through BioWare's subsequent role-playing games: companions with personal histories and conflicts could become as important to players as the main plot, even encouraging them to choose a party for affection rather than combat efficiency. He traced that approach through Star Wars: Knights of the Old Republic, Mass Effect and Dragon Age, and identified its influence in the work of other role-playing-game developers, including Obsidian Entertainment, Larian Studios and Owlcat Games.

Characters and narrative elements from the Baldur's Gate games continued to be adapted for later Dungeons & Dragons publications and licensed media. The 2013 tabletop adventure Murder in Baldur's Gate continued the Bhaalspawn storyline through Abdel Adrian, the version of Gorion's Ward used in the novelizations. It also incorporated characters and references originating in the games. The later fifth-edition supplement Minsc and Boo's Journal of Villainy, written by original Baldur's Gate lead designer James Ohlen with contributions from former BioWare writers, provided tabletop portrayals of numerous characters from Baldur's Gate II, including Jaheira, Valygar, Irenicus, Bodhi, Imoen, Edwin, Saemon, Sarevok and Viconia. Several members of the cast were also added as playable characters to the licensed D&D video game Idle Champions of the Forgotten Realms, including Minsc, Jaheira, Viconia and Imoen. Characters including Imoen, Jaheira, Jan, Irenicus, Mazzy, Rasaad, Sarevok, Viconia, Wilson, Minsc and Boo were subsequently represented in Wizards of the Coast's 2022 Magic: The Gathering crossover set Commander Legends: Battle for Baldur's Gate.
