= Nishri =

Nishri is a surname. Notable people with the surname include:

- Zvi Nishri (Orloff) (1878–1973), Russian/Palestinian/Israeli pioneer in modern physical education
- Miri Nishri (born 1950), Colombian/Israeli interdisciplinary artist

== See also ==
- Nishi (surname)
