= Od ani holeh =

2008 book by Yaky Yosha

Still Walking
- Hebrew 2008 1st edition of Still Walking
- Author: Yaky Yosha
- Original title: עוד אני הולך
- Cover artist: Miri Nishri
- Language: Hebrew
- Genre: Novel
- Publisher: Hakibutz Hameuchad, Tel-Aviv
- Publication date: March 2008
- Publication place: Israel
- Media type: Print (Paperback)
- Pages: 174 pp

Od ani holeh (Hebrew: עוד אני הולך) I Am Still Walking is a book and a film based on the book. It is from film director Yaky Yosha's first novel, published in Hebrew in March 2008. The novel was followed by a film based on the story. Production began in the summer of 2008 in Tel Aviv. According to Yosha: "Still Walking" is Shalom's older brother, and show the same youngsters pondering over the social and political state they live in, when they're a generation older. The film, following the book, will track them down when all is without hope."

== Plot summary ==
The narrative takes place in Tel Aviv, at the dawn of the 2006 Lebanon War. Mickey, an ex–Special Forces officer, and ex-Shabak agent (Israeli Security Services), has spent the night in a casino, losing a fortune. Now, at 4 AM, Mickey is lying in a rainy, darken alley, having a severe heart attack.

While Mickey recovers, we learn about his life. Mickey is married to Laura, presently an alcoholic, and a formerly vivacious, beautiful and promising young individual. His son, Absalom, both condemns and loves him, and is involved with Olga, a Russian immigrant and former prostitute. Mickey, himself, was shamefully released from his elite unit, for inappropriate compassion, sparing a young Arab terrorist, and later from the Shabak, for unjustified cruelty, killing an innocent Arab, father of six.

We follow Mickey as he discovers that his family, mistress, and brothers in arms cannot prevent him from sinking into the pit he dug for himself. We watch as Mickey struggles to compensate for his transgressions, while eluding the mafia goons that are after him for his gambling debts.
