= Jon Irenicus =

Baldur's Gate video game character

- Baldur's Gate character
- Portrait of Jon Irenicus from Baldur's Gate II: Shadows of Amn
- First appearance: Baldur's Gate II: Shadows of Amn (2000)
- Voiced by: David Warner

In-universe information
- Race: Elf
- Gender: Male
- Class: Mage
- Alignment: Neutral Evil
- Home: Suldanessellar

Jon Irenicus, also known mononymously as Irenicus, is a fictional character in the Baldur's Gate series of role-playing video games. He is the principal antagonist of BioWare's Baldur's Gate II: Shadows of Amn (2000), in which he is voiced by David Warner. An exiled elven mage, he imprisons the player character and later steals their soul, prompting a pursuit that leads to a confrontation in his former home.

Irenicus originated in James Ohlen's Dungeons & Dragons campaigns, but his elven backstory was developed late in the game's production and had not existed before the revision by writer David Gaider, who wrote and integrated the revised history after Ohlen decided that the existing antagonist was insufficiently interesting. Warner reprised the role in Baldur's Gate: Siege of Dragonspear. The character has appeared in the novelization of Shadows of Amn and other media adaptations.

Critics have praised Irenicus's characterization and Warner's performance for combining authority with cruelty, while examining the relationship between his ambitions and the player character's increasing power. His recurring presence in the narrative of Baldur's Gate II has also attracted commentary and serves as an influence on subsequent role-playing video games.

== Concept and creation ==
Irenicus was based on a character from Baldur's Gate designer James Ohlen's Dungeons & Dragons campaigns. According to David Gaider, however, the character remained a human wizard motivated by megalomania until late in the development of Baldur's Gate II. In a 2025 retrospective interview, Gaider recalled that Ohlen had found this version insufficiently interesting. Gaider could not remember whether the replacement concept came from Ohlen, their discussions, or an instruction from Ohlen to devise a new history. Gaider wrote the new history quickly because the game was nearing completion, then revised existing material, including the opening dungeon, to introduce references to it. Work on the elven city of Suldanessellar had only recently begun, which allowed him to connect Irenicus's past to the city and its queen, Ellesime.

Gaider also recalled during a podcast episode discussing an anniversary retrospective of Baldur's Gate II that the dream sequences and interstitial scenes were probably added around this time, although he did not write the dreams. He attributed their introduction to Ohlen, who wanted Irenicus to appear more frequently when production was too advanced to incorporate him into additional plots. BioWare's published story-design guidelines for Baldur's Gate II called for players to be kept informed of the villain's activities through chapter-transition cutscenes or periodic involvement in the main plot.

David Warner voiced Irenicus in the 2000 game and reprised the role in the 2016 expansion to Baldur's Gate: Enhanced Edition, Siege of Dragonspear,.

== Appearances ==
=== Baldur's Gate II ===
In Baldur's Gate II: Shadows of Amn, Irenicus imprisons and experiments on the player character, a mortal descendant of the god Bhaal, and their companions. When intruders interrupt him, Imoen frees the protagonist and they escape his dungeon. Imoen subsequently attacks Irenicus in the city of Athkatla, attracting the Cowled Wizards, who arrest them both for using magic. The protagonist follows them to Spellhold, where Irenicus steals the souls of both the protagonist and Imoen.

The pursuit eventually leads to Suldanessellar, from which Irenicus was exiled. Formerly known as Joneleth, he was the lover of Queen Ellesime and seeks power from the city's sacred Tree of Life. After the party defeats him there, the protagonist is drawn into Hell through their connection to the stolen soul. A final battle with Irenicus allows the protagonist to recover their soul and return to life.

Irenicus also appears in Philip Athans's 2000 novelization of Baldur's Gate II.

=== Other ===
Siege of Dragonspear places his return in the interval between the first two Baldur's Gate games.

Irenicus was adapted for the 2021 Dungeons & Dragons supplement Minsc and Boo's Journal of Villainy, which includes a character history and game statistics. In 2022, he appeared as the card Jon Irenicus, Shattered One in the Magic: The Gathering set Commander Legends: Battle for Baldur's Gate.

== Reception and legacy ==
The mystery surrounding Irenicus's intentions contributed to his appeal for Heiko Klinge of GameStar. Klinge wrote that the opening encounter made him want to understand the character as well as defeat him. The gradual disclosure of Irenicus's history, former relationship and desire for immortality, together with repeated confrontations, sustained this interest; Klinge described the ending as an emotional farewell to both the game and a worthy adversary. The pursuit itself received a more qualified assessment from Steven Bellotti of RPGamer, who found the plot more straightforward than the first game's mystery: the villain is introduced immediately, and stopping him becomes the obvious objective.

Irenicus's motivations have been interpreted in terms of both loss and frustrated ambition. Paul Dean of PC Gamer described him as driven by heartbreak and embittered by an attempt to recover something he could no longer clearly remember. In his book about the game, Matt Bell identified an irony in Irenicus's pursuit of power: the struggle against him strengthens the protagonist, helping prepare them for the possibility of godhood in Throne of Bhaal. Bell considered Irenicus's defeat more pathetic because the protagonist comes to possess the power the antagonist wanted for himself.

Bell also examined how the pursuit organizes the game's narrative. He described its compulsory stages, including the soul theft at Spellhold and the final confrontations, as narrative "islands" within the player's more freely chosen adventures. He argued that these stages made the story more personal and gave companions more opportunities to react to events. However, he questioned the distinction between the lasting harm attributed to Irenicus and the reversible violence of ordinary play. Although the opening depicts the protagonist's brutal torture, the character emerges from captivity with full health; Bell observed that the first minor enemy can inflict more measurable damage than Irenicus's experiments.

Warner's vocal performance as Irenicus has received retrospective praise. Bellotti considered Irenicus the strongest performance in the game, finding dignity and malice in dialogue that seemed ordinary on the page. Rick Lane of PC Gamer similarly credited Warner's commanding portrayal of the arrogant mage with making Irenicus memorable and contributing to the game's lasting appeal. Riordan Zentler of The Spokesman-Review credited Warner's "vocal gravitas" with making Irenicus intimidating from the game's opening scenes, describing Warner as a standout among Baldur's Gate II's voice cast and arguing that his performance contributed to the game's enduring reputation. C. T. Phipps of Grimdark Magazine likewise considered Warner's portrayal central to the sequel, arguing that Irenicus possesses gravitas that is on par with a protagonist of a George R.R. Martin story, and that the antagonist effectively dominates the game's narrative despite its wider story concerning the protagonist's heritage as a Bhaalspawn. Following Warner's death in 2022, C. J. Wheeler of Rock Paper Shotgun highlighted Irenicus among Warner's notable video game roles.

Irenicus also served as a point of comparison in later role-playing game design. Discussing Pillars of Eternity II: Deadfire, director Josh Sawyer contrasted Irenicus with Thaos, the antagonist of the first Pillars of Eternity. Whereas Thaos operates covertly, Irenicus acts openly and can be discussed by other characters. Sawyer made this comparison while explaining the sequel's use of Eothas, a god embodied in a giant statue whose passage visibly affects the world, allowing other characters to share the player's awareness of the threat.

The adaptation of Jon Irenicus into Magic: The Gathering prompted criticism of how the card game represented the character by Karington Hess of Star City Games, who argued that mechanics which give creatures to opponents poorly reflected Irenicus's character. Hess suggested that taking opponents' resources would better express his theft of souls and pursuit of immortality.
