= Still Walking (disambiguation) =

Still Walking is a 2008 Japanese film by Hirokazu Kore-eda.

Still Walking may also refer to:

- Od ani holeh, a book by Yaky Yosha and a film based on the book, whose English title is sometimes translated as Still Walking
- Still Walking, 2011 album by Graeme Connors
- "Still Walking", track on 1979 album 20 Jazz Funk Greats by Throbbing Gristle
