= David Warner (actor) =

British actor (1941–2022)

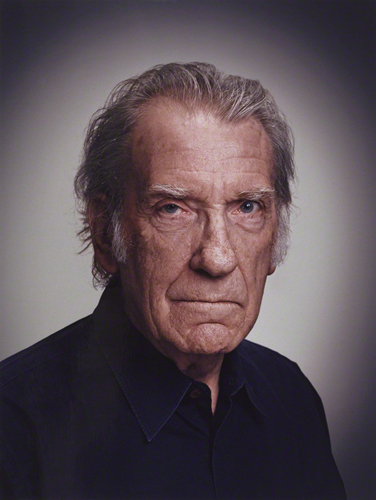
- Warner in 2013
- Born: David Hattersley Warner; 29 July 1941; Manchester, England
- Died: 24 July 2022 (aged 80); Northwood, London, England
- Education: Royal Academy of Dramatic Art
- Occupation: Actor
- Years active: 1962–2022
- Spouses: Harriet Lindgren (m. 1969; div. 1972); Sheilah Kent (m. 1981; div. 2002)
- Partner: Lisa Bowerman (from 2006)
- Children: 1
- Awards: 1981 Emmy Award for Outstanding Supporting Actor in a Miniseries or Special

Signature
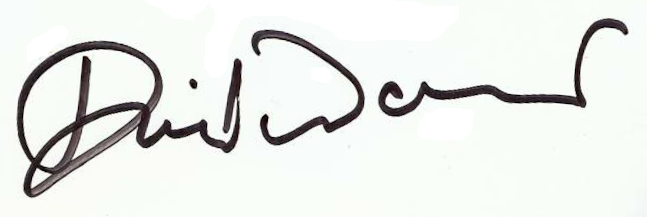

David Hattersley Warner (29 July 1941 – 24 July 2022) was an English actor who portrayed a variety of villainous characters, as well as more sympathetic roles, in a career spanning six decades across stage and screen. His accolades include a Primetime Emmy Award and nominations for a BAFTA Award and a Screen Actors Guild Award.

Warner trained at the Royal Academy of Dramatic Art before joining the Royal Shakespeare Company (RSC), with whom he made his stage debut in 1962 and, in 1964, played Henry VI in the Wars of the Roses cycle at the West End's Aldwych Theatre. The RSC then cast him as Prince Hamlet in Peter Hall's 1965 production of Hamlet. Warner made his Broadway debut in the 2001 revival of Major Barbara.

He gained prominence as the lead in the film Morgan: A Suitable Case for Treatment (Karel Reisz, 1966), for which he was nominated for the BAFTA Award for Best Actor in a Leading Role. His other roles include those in The Omen (1976), Time After Time (1979), Time Bandits (1981), The French Lieutenant's Woman (1981), Tron (1982), A Christmas Carol (1984), Seven Servants (1996), Titanic (1997), Scream 2 (1997), Ladies in Lavender (2002), and Mary Poppins Returns (2018). He is also known for his roles in the films Star Trek V: The Final Frontier (1989) and Star Trek VI: The Undiscovered Country (1991).

For his work in television, Warner received two Primetime Emmy Award for Outstanding Supporting Actor in a Miniseries or TV Movie nominations, for his portrayals of Reinhard Heydrich in the NBC miniseries Holocaust (1978) and Pomponius Falco in the ABC miniseries Masada (1981); he won for the latter.

== Early life ==
Warner was born on 29 July 1941, in Manchester, Lancashire, the son of Ada Doreen Hattersley and Herbert Simon Warner, a nursing home proprietor. He was born out of wedlock and frequently taken to be brought up by each of his parents, eventually settling with his stepmother and his father, a Russian Jew. At 18 years of age he started at RADA, from which graduated in 1961 with an Acting (RADA Diploma).

== Career ==
=== Theatre ===
Warner made his professional stage debut at the Royal Court Theatre in January 1962, playing Snout, a minor role in Shakespeare's A Midsummer Night's Dream, directed by Tony Richardson for the English Stage Company. In March 1962, at the Belgrade Theatre, Coventry, he played Conrad in Much Ado About Nothing, following which in June he appeared as Jim in Afore Night Come at the New Arts Theatre in London.

He joined the Royal Shakespeare Company in Stratford-upon-Avon in April 1963 to play Trinculo in The Tempest, and Cinna the Poet in Julius Caesar, and in July was cast as Henry VI in the John Barton adaptation of Henry VI, Parts I, II and III, which comprised the first two plays from The Wars of the Roses trilogy. At the West End's Aldwych Theatre in January 1964, he again played Henry VI in the complete The Wars of the Roses history cycle (1964). Returning to Stratford in April, he performed the title role in Richard II, Mouldy in Henry IV, Part 2 and Henry VI. At the Aldwych in October 1964, he was cast as Valentine Brose in the play Eh? by Henry Livings, a role he reprised in the 1968 film adaptation Work Is a Four-Letter Word.

He first played the title role in Hamlet for the RSC in Stratford-upon-Avon in 1965. This production transferred to the Aldwych Theatre in December of that year. In the 1966, Stratford season, his Hamlet was revived and he also played Sir Andrew Aguecheek in Twelfth Night. Finally at the Aldwych in January 1970, he played Julian in Tiny Alice.

According to his 2007 programme CV, Warner's other work for the theatre included The Great Exhibition at Hampstead Theatre (February 1972); I, Claudius at the Queen's Theatre (July 1972); A Feast of Snails at the Lyric Theatre (February 2002); Where There's a Will at the Theatre Royal, Bath; King Lear at Chichester Festival Theatre (2005), see details below); and also Major Barbara on Broadway in 2001.

=== Film and television ===
In 1963, he made his film debut as the villainous Blifil in Tom Jones, and in 1965, starred as Henry VI in the BBC television version of the RSC's The Wars of the Roses cycle of Shakespeare's history plays. He starred alongside Bob Dylan in the 1963 play Madhouse on Castle Street. A major step in his career was the leading role in Morgan: A Suitable Case for Treatment (1966), opposite Vanessa Redgrave, which established his reputation for playing slightly off-the-wall characters. He also appeared as Konstantin Treplev in Sidney Lumet's 1968 adaptation of Anton Chekhov's The Sea Gull and starred alongside Jason Robards and Stella Stevens as Reverend Joshua Duncan Sloane in Sam Peckinpah's The Ballad of Cable Hogue.

In horror films, he appeared in one of the stories of From Beyond the Grave, opposite Gregory Peck in The Omen (1976), as the ill-fated photojournalist Keith Jennings, and the 1979 thriller Nightwing. He also starred in cult classic Waxwork (1988), and featured alongside a young Viggo Mortensen in the 1990 film Tripwire.

He often played villains, in films such as The Thirty Nine Steps (1978), Time After Time (1979), Time Bandits (1981), Tron (1982), Hanna's War (1988). Warner's voice acting roles in television include Ra's al Ghul in Batman: The Animated Series, Herbert Landon in Spider-Man: The Animated Series, Alpha in Men in Black: The Series, the Archmage in Disney's Gargoyles, and the Lobe in Freakazoid!. He was also cast against type as Henry Niles in Straw Dogs (1971) and as Bob Cratchit in the 1984 telefilm A Christmas Carol starring George C. Scott as Scrooge. In addition, he played German SS Obergruppenführer Reinhard Heydrich both in the film Hitler's SS: Portrait in Evil, and the television miniseries Holocaust; as sinister millionaire Amos Hackshaw in HBO's original 1991 film Cast a Deadly Spell.

In 1981, Warner received an Emmy Award for Outstanding Supporting Actor in a Miniseries or Special for Masada as Pomponius Falco. In 1988, he appeared in the Danny Huston film Mr. North.

He subsequently appeared in films such as Star Trek V: The Final Frontier (1989), Star Trek VI: The Undiscovered Country, Avatar (known as Matrix Hunter in the US), Teenage Mutant Ninja Turtles II: The Secret of the Ooze (1991), Titanic (the third time he appeared in a film that is about or includes reference to RMS Titanic) and Scream 2. In 2001, he played Captain James Sawyer in two episodes of A&E's adaptation of C.S. Forester's Hornblower series. He appeared in three episodes of the second season of Twin Peaks (1991) as "Thomas Eckhardt". He also continued to play classical roles. In "Chain of Command", an episode of Star Trek: The Next Generation, he was a Cardassian interrogator. He based his portrayal on the evil "re-educator" from 1984. He appeared in Murder, She Wrote in 1993 as a Hong Kong-based detective. His less-spectacular roles included a double-role in the low-budget fantasy Quest of the Delta Knights (1993) which was eventually spoofed on Mystery Science Theater 3000. He also played Admiral Tolwyn in the film version of Wing Commander.

Warner's sympathetic side had been evident in Sam Peckinpah's Cross of Iron (1977), where he portrayed Captain Kiesel. Other "nice guy" roles include in Ken Russel's William and Dorothy (1978), portraying the poet William Wordsworth, the charismatic "Aldous Gajic" in "Grail", a first season (1994) episode of Babylon 5 and "Chancellor Gorkon" in Star Trek VI: The Undiscovered Country (1991). In an episode of Lois & Clark: The New Adventures of Superman, he played Superman's father Jor-El, who appeared to his son through holographic recordings. Warner also played "ambiguous nice guys" such as vampire bat exterminator Philip Payne in 1979's Nightwing; and Dr. Richard Madden in 1994's Necronomicon: Book of the Dead. In Seven Servants by Daryush Shokof, he co-starred with Anthony Quinn in 1996.

Another 'sympathetic' role was in 2013, when he played Professor Grisenko in the Doctor Who episode "Cold War" in which he battled a revived Ice Warrior and struck up a rapport with the Doctor's companion Clara Oswald. Warner also appeared in the second series of the Sky 1 comedy-drama Mad Dogs, and starred in two 2014 episodes of the horror series Penny Dreadful as Abraham Van Helsing.

Warner contributed "Sonnet 25" to the 2002 compilation album When Love Speaks, which consists of Shakespearean sonnets and play excerpts as interpreted by famous actors and musicians. He performed in many audio plays for Big Finish Productions, starring in the Doctor Who Unbound play Sympathy for the Devil (2003) as an alternative version of the Third Doctor who was exiled to Earth in 1997 instead of the 1970s after his trial in The War Games. Warner also appeared in a series of plays based on ITV's Sapphire & Steel as Steel. He reprised his incarnation of the Doctor in a Doctor Who Unbound sequel, Masters of War (2008), where he travelled in the TARDIS to Skaro with Brigadier Lethbridge-Stewart. In 2007, Warner guest starred as Isaac Newton in the Doctor Who audio drama Circular Time and as Cuthbert in four of the seven stories in the second Fourth Doctor series. He also guest starred in the BBC Radio 4 science fiction comedy Nebulous (2005) as Professor Nebulous' arch-enemy Dr. Joseph Klench. In all these productions, Warner worked with writer and comedian Mark Gatiss of the League of Gentlemen, and plays a guest role in the League's 2005 feature film The League of Gentlemen's Apocalypse. He also performed in radio plays for the American companies L.A. Theatre Works and the Hollywood Theater of the Ear. In 2005, Warner read a new adaptation of Oliver Twist for BBC Radio 2 (adapted by Neville Teller and directed by Neil Gardner). In 2008, he guest-starred as Mycroft Holmes in the Bernice Summerfield audio play The Adventure of the Diogenes Damsel. In 2009, he was the voice of Lord Azlok of the Viperox, an insectoid alien race in the animated Doctor Who serial "Dreamland". In 2016, he returned as his alternate Doctor in a series of audios where his Doctor briefly travels to the 'prime' universe and enlists the Seventh Doctor's companion Benny Summerfield (Lisa Bowerman) to try and help him save his universe. Warner's Doctor continued his travels with Benny in a second series of audios released in 2017. Warner ended up doing five seasons of The New Adventures of Bernice Summerfield playing his alternate Doctor. Shortly before his death in 2022, it was revealed Warner would return as his alternate Doctor as part of Finish's celebration of the 60th anniversary and would share scenes with Christopher Eccleston, who appeared as the Ninth Doctor.

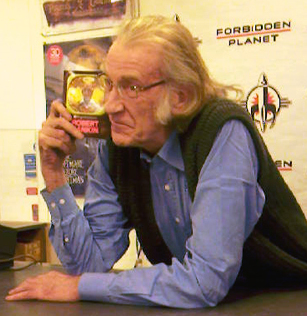
Warner in 2008

He also contributed voice acting to a number of video games, notably playing the villain Jon Irenicus in Baldur's Gate II: Shadows of Amn and Morpheus in Fallout. Warner did voice work on the short-lived FOX animated series Toonsylvania as Dr. Vic Frankenstein. He was also the first voice of the demon Nergal from The Grim Adventures of Billy & Mandy, but was later replaced by Martin Jarvis. Warner narrated the Disney direct-to-video Pooh's Grand Adventure: The Search for Christopher Robin.

In March 2010, it was announced that Warner would be joining the cast of the Dark Shadows audio drama miniseries Kingdom of the Dead.

=== Return to theatre and later work ===
In 2001, Warner returned to the stage after a nearly three-decade hiatus to play Andrew Undershaft in a Broadway revival of George Bernard Shaw's Major Barbara. In May 2005, at the Chichester Festival Theatre Warner made a return to Shakespeare, playing the title role in Steven Pimlott's production of King Lear. Tim Walker, reviewing the performance in The Sunday Telegraph, wrote: "Warner is physically the least imposing king I have ever seen, but his slight, gaunt body serves also to accentuate the vulnerability the part requires. So, too, does the fact that he is older by decades than most of the other members of the youthful cast."

On 30 October 2005, he appeared on stage at The Old Vic theatre in London in the one-night play Night Sky alongside Christopher Eccleston, Bruno Langley, Navin Chowdhry, Saffron Burrows and David Baddiel. In December 2006, he starred in Terry Pratchett's Hogfather on Sky One as Lord Downey. And in August 2007, as an RSC Honorary Artist, he returned to Stratford for the first time in over 40 years to play Sir John Falstaff in the Courtyard Theatre revival of Henry IV, Part 1 and Henry IV, Part 2 which were part of the RSC Histories Cycle.

In February 2008, Warner was heard as the popular fictional character Hugo Rune in a new 13-part audio adaptation of Robert Rankin's The Brightonomicon released by Hokus Bloke Productions and BBC Audiobooks. He starred alongside some high-profile names including cult science fiction actress and Superman star Sarah Douglas, Rupert Degas, The Lord of the Rings actor Andy Serkis, Harry Potter villain Jason Isaacs, Mark Wing-Davey and Martin Jarvis (written by Elliott Stein & Neil Gardner, and produced/directed by Neil Gardner).

In October 2008, Warner played the role of Lord Mountbatten of Burma in the BBC Four television film In Love with Barbara, a biopic about the life of romantic novelist Barbara Cartland. He played Povel Wallander, the father of Kurt Wallander, in BBC One's Wallander.

=== Other work ===
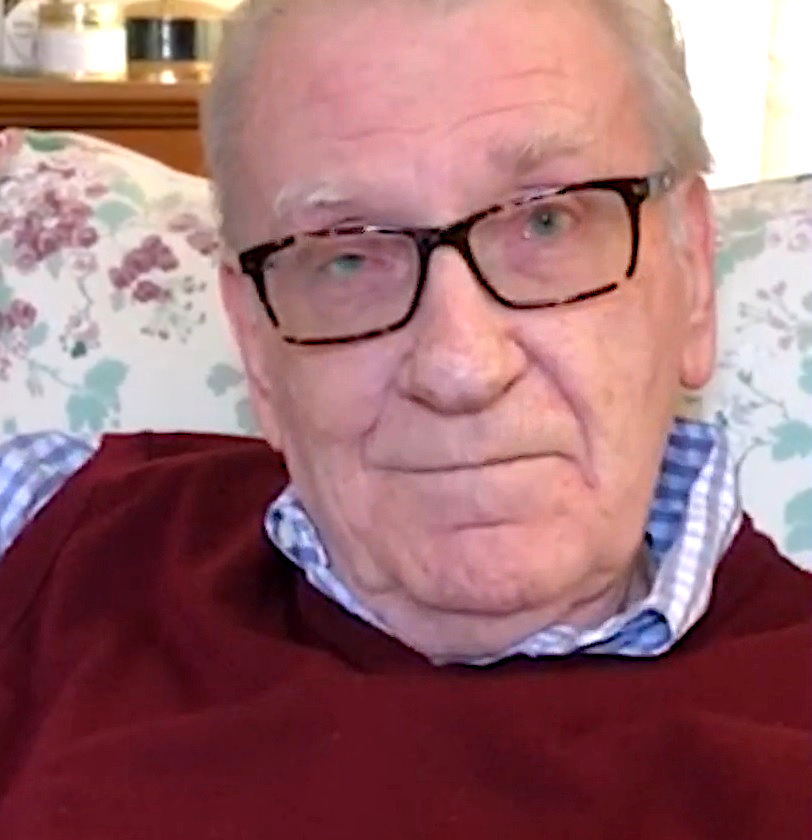
David Warner aged 78, at the German Comic Con (2019)

In 2010, writer and actor Mark Gatiss interviewed Warner about his role in The Omen (1976) for his BBC documentary series A History of Horror. In November 2013, David Warner posed for Rory Lewis Photographers 'Northerners' Exhibition, Warner's image was acquired by the National Portrait Gallery in London, and was the first professional portrait sitting of Warner since 1966.

== Personal life and death ==
Warner married his first wife, Harriet Lindgren, in 1969; they divorced in 1972. He married his second wife, Sheilah Kent, in 1981; they had a daughter in 1982, and divorced in 2002. Warner's partner from 2006 until his death in 2022 was Lisa Bowerman.

Warner died of a cancer-related illness at Denville Hall, in Northwood, London, on 24 July 2022, aged 80.

== Filmography ==
=== Film ===
Year	Title	Role	Notes	Ref.
1962	We Joined the Navy	Sailor painting ship	Uncredited	
1963	The King's Breakfast	1st trumpeter	Short film	
1963	Tom Jones	Blifil		
1966	Morgan: A Suitable Case for Treatment	Morgan Delt		
1967	The Deadly Affair	Edward II	Uncredited	
1968	The Bofors Gun	Terry "Lance Bar" Evans		
1968	Work Is a Four-Letter Word	Valentine Brose		
1968	A Midsummer Night's Dream	Lysander		
1968	The Fixer	Count Odoevsky		
1968	The Sea Gull	Konstantin Treplev		
1969	Michael Kohlhaas - Der Rebell	Michael Kohlhaas		
1970	The Ballad of Cable Hogue	Joshua Duncan Sloane		
1970	Perfect Friday	Lord Nicholas "Nick" Dorset		
1971	Straw Dogs	Henry Niles	Uncredited	
1973	A Doll's House	Torvald Helmer		
1974	From Beyond the Grave	Edward Charlton	Segment: "The Gate Crasher"	
1974	Little Malcolm	Dennis Charles Nipple		
1975	Mister Quilp	Sampson Brass		
1976	The Omen	Keith Jennings		
1977	Providence	Kevin Langham, Kevin Woodford		
1977	Cross of Iron	Hauptmann Kiesel		
1977	Age of Innocence	Henry Buchanan		
1977	Silver Bears	Agha Firdausi		
1977	The Disappearance	Burbank		
1978	The Thirty Nine Steps	Sir Edmund Appleton		
1979	Nightwing	Phillip Payne		
1979	The Concorde... Airport '79	Peter O'Neill		
1979	Time After Time	John Stevenson / Jack the Ripper		
1980	The Island	John David Nau		
1981	Time Bandits	Evil		
1981	The French Lieutenant's Woman	Murphy		
1982	Contact	Narrator	Documentary of the investigation of UFO contactee Billy Meier's experiences & investigation of evidence.	
1982	Tron	Ed Dillinger, Sark, Master Control Program		
1983	The Man with Two Brains	Alfred Necessiter		
1984	The Company of Wolves	Father		
1984	Summer Lightning	George Millington		
1987	Hansel and Gretel	Father		
1987	My Best Friend Is a Vampire	Leopold McCarthy		
1988	Waxwork	David Lincoln		
1988	Mr. North	Doctor McPherson		
1988	Office Party	Eugene Brackin		
1988	Hanna's War	Capt. Julian Simon		
1988	Magdalene	Baron von Seidl		
1988	Keys to Freedom	Nigel Heath		
1989	Star Trek V: The Final Frontier	St. John Talbot		
1989	Grave Secrets	Carl Farnsworth		
1989	Tripwire	Josef Szabo		
1989	Mortal Passions	Doctor Terrence Powers		
1991	Teenage Mutant Ninja Turtles II: The Secret of the Ooze	Jordan Perry		
1991	Blue Tornado	Commander Heller		
1991	Star Trek VI: The Undiscovered Country	Chancellor Gorkon		
1992	The Lost World	Professor Summerlee		
1992	The Unnamable II: The Statement of Randolph Carter	Chancellor Thayer		
1993	Quest of the Delta Knights	Baydool, Lord Vultare, Narrator		
1993	H.P. Lovecraft's Necronomicon	Dr Madden		
1993	Pretty Princess	Prince Max		
1994	Felony	Cooper		
1994	Tryst	Jason		
1994	Inner Sanctum II	Dr Lamont		
1994	In the Mouth of Madness	Dr Wrenn		
1995	Ice Cream Man	Reverend Langley		
1995	Final Equinox	Shilow		
1995	Luise and the Jackpot	The Butler		
1996	Rasputin: Dark Servant of Destiny	Eugene Botkin		
1996	Naked Souls	Everett Longstreet		
1996	Seven Servants	Blade		
1996	The Leading Man	Tod		
1997	Pooh's Grand Adventure: The Search for Christopher Robin	The Narrator		
1997	Money Talks	Barclay (James' Boss)		
1997	Titanic	Spicer Lovejoy		
1997	Scream 2	Gus Gold		
1998	The Last Leprechaun	Simpson		
1999	Wing Commander	Admiral Geoffrey Tolwyn		
2000	Back to the Secret Garden	Dr Snodgrass		
2001	Planet of the Apes	Senator Sandar		
2001	The Little Unicorn	Ted Regan		
2001	Superstition	Judge Padovani		
2002	The Code Conspiracy	Professor		
2003	Kiss of Life	Pap		
2004	Straight into Darkness	Deacon		
2004	Cortex	Master of Organisation		
2004	Ladies in Lavender	Francis Mead		
2004	Avatar	Joseph Lau		
2005	The League of Gentlemen's Apocalypse	Erasmus Pea		
2010	Black Death	Abbot		
2010	Quantum Quest: A Cassini Space Odyssey	Void (voice)		
2011	A Thousand Kisses Deep	Max		
2013	Before I Sleep	Eugene Devlin		
2013	Old Habits	John	Short film	
2017	You, Me and Him	Michael Miller		
2018	Mary Poppins Returns	Admiral Boom		

=== Television ===
Year	Title	Role	Notes	Ref.
1962	Madhouse on Castle Street	Lennie	Videotaped television play	
1963	Z-Cars	Gee	Episode: "The Hitch-Hiker"	
1963	Armchair Theatre	Steve	Episode: "The Push Over"	
1965	The Wars of the Roses	King Henry VI	Miniseries	
1970	NBC Experiment in Television	Dominic Boot	Episode: "The Engagement"	
1975	Three Comedies of Marriage	Bobby	Episode: "Bobby Bluesocks"	
1976	Clouds of Glory	William Wordsworth	2 episodes	
1977	The Blue Hotel	Swede	Television film	
1978	Holocaust	Reinhard Heydrich	Miniseries	
1979	S.O.S. Titanic	Lawrence Beesley	Television film	
1981	Masada	Falco	ABC miniseries	
1982	Nancy Astor	Philip Kerr	4 episodes	
1982–1983	Marco Polo	Rustichello da Pisa	Miniseries	
1983	Remington Steele	Alexander Sebastien	2 episodes	
1983	Hart to Hart	Mr. Bowlly	Episode: "Two Harts Are Better Than One"	
1984	Charlie	Charlie Alexander	Television film	
1984	A Christmas Carol	Bob Cratchit	Television film	
1984	Frankenstein	The Creature	Television film	
1984	Faerie Tale Theatre	Zandor, the Innkeeper	Episode: "The Boy Who Left Home to Find Out About the Shivers"	
1985	Love's Labour's Lost	Don Armado	BBC Television Shakespeare	
1985	Hitler's SS: Portrait in Evil	Reinhard Heydrich	Television film	
1985	Hold the Back Page	Ken Wordsworth	Television mini-series	
1987	Crossbow	The Alchemist	Episode: "Vogel"	
1988	Worlds Beyond	Ken Larkin	Episode: "Reflections of Evil"	
1990	Murder, She Wrote	Justin Hunnicut	Episode: "The Szechuan Dragon"	
1990	Perry Mason: The Case of the Poisoned Pen	Bradley Thompson	Television film	
1990	Spymaker: The Secret Life of Ian Fleming	Admiral Godfrey	Television film	
1990	Father Dowling Investigates	Sir Arthur Wedgeworth	Episode: "The Murder Weekend Mystery"	
1991	Uncle Vanya	Ivan "Uncle Vanya" Voynitsky	Television film	
1991	Cast a Deadly Spell	Amos Hackshaw	Television film	
1991	Twin Peaks	Thomas Eckhardt	3 episodes	
1992	Star Trek: The Next Generation	Gul Madred	Episode: "Chain of Command"	
1992	Tales from the Crypt	Alan Getz	Episode: "The New Arrival"	
1992	Captain Planet and the Planeteers	Zarm (voice)	Episode: "The Dream Machine"	
1992–1994	The Legend of Prince Valiant	Duke Richard of Lionsgate (voice)	7 episodes	
1992–1995	Batman: The Animated Series	Ra's al Ghul (voice)	5 episodes	
1993	Perry Mason: The Case of the Skin-Deep Scandal	Harley Griswold	Television film	
1993	Dinosaurs	Spirit of the Tree (voice)	Episode: "If I Were a Tree"	
1993	Wild Palms	Eli Levitt	Miniseries	
1993	Body Bags	Dr. Lock	Television film	
1993	Murder, She Wrote	Insp. McLaughlin	Episode: "A Death in Hong Kong"	
1993	The Adventures of Brisco County, Jr.	Winston Smiles	Episode: "Deep in the Heart of Dixie"	
1993–1994	The Larry Sanders Show	Richard Germain	2 episodes	
1994	Lois & Clark: The New Adventures of Superman	Jor-El	Episode: "The Foundling"	
1994	Babylon 5	Aldous Gajic	Episode: "Grail"	
1994	Mighty Max	Talon (voice)	Episode: "Souls of Talon"	
1995	Biker Mice from Mars	Ice Breaker (voice)	Episode: "Below the Horizon"	
1995	The Choir	Alexander Troy	5 episodes	
1995	Iron Man	Arthur Dearborn (voice)	Episode: "Cell of Iron"	
1995	Gargoyles	Archmage (voice)	4 episodes	
1995–1997	Spider-Man: The Animated Series	Herbert Landon (voice)	12 episodes	
1995–1997	Freakazoid!	The Lobe (voice)	10 episodes	
1996	Beastmaster III: The Eye of Braxus	Lord Agon	Television film	
1997	Captain Simian & the Space Monkeys	The Glyph (voice)	Episode: "Rhesus Pieces"	
1997	Perversions of Science	Dr. Nordhoff	Episode: "The Exile"	
1997	Roar	Narrator	Episode: "Pilot"	
1997	A Mind to Kill	David Caulfield	Episode: "Green Wounds"	
1997–2001	Men in Black: The Series	Alpha (voice)	9 episodes	
1998	Three	The Man	2 episodes	
1998	Houdini	Arthur Conan Doyle	Television film	
1998	Toonsylvania	Victor Frankenstein (voice)	Main role	
1998	A Winnie the Pooh Thanksgiving	The Narrator	Television special	
1999	Winnie the Pooh: A Valentine for You	The Narrator	Television special	
1999	The Outer Limits	Inspector Harold Langford	2 episodes	
1999	Total Recall 2070	Felix Latham	2 episodes	
1999	Superman: The Animated Series	Ra's al Ghul (voice)	Episode: "The Demon Reborn"	
1999	The Hunger	Vassu	Episode: "Nunc Dimittis"	
2000	Cinderella	Martin	Television film	
2000	Batman Beyond	Ra's al Ghul (voice)	Episode: "Out of the Past"	
2000	In the Beginning	Eliezer	Miniseries	
2000	Buzz Lightyear of Star Command	Lord Angstrom (voice)	2 episodes	
2000	The Secret Adventures of Jules Verne	Arago	2 episodes	
2000	Love & Money	Hugh	Episode: "Diagnosis: Effie"	
2001	Hornblower	Captain James Sawyer	Miniseries, 2 episodes	
2001–2003	The Grim Adventures of Billy & Mandy	Nergal (voice)	3 episodes	
2002	The Investigation	Superintendent Bruce Northorp	Television film	
2002	Dr Jekyll and Mr Hyde	Sir Danvers Carew	Television film	
2002–2003	What's New, Scooby-Doo?	Old Man (voice)	3 episodes	
2004	Conviction	Lenny Fairburn	Supporting role	
2004	Agatha Christie's Marple	Luther Crackenthorpe	Episode: "4:50 from Paddington"	
2006	Sweeney Todd	Sir John Fielding	Television film	
2006	Ancient Rome: The Rise and Fall of an Empire	Claudius Pulcher	Episode: "Revolution"	
2006	Terry Pratchett's Hogfather	Lord Downey	Miniseries	
2006	Perfect Parents	Father Thomas	Television film	
2007	Wild at Heart	Gerald	Season 2, episode 8	
2008	In Love with Barbara	Louis Mountbatten	Television film	
2008–2015	Wallander	Povel Wallander	5 episodes	
2009	Doctor Who: Dreamland	Lord Azlok (voice)	6 episodes	
2011	Mad Dogs	Mackenzie	3 episodes	
2012	The Secret of Crickley Hall	Percy Judd	All 3 episodes	
2012	Midsomer Murders	Peter Fossett	Episode: "Death in the Slow Lane"	
2013	Doctor Who	Professor Grisenko	Episode: "Cold War"	
2014	Penny Dreadful	Abraham Van Helsing	2 episodes	
2015	Inside No.9	Justice Pike	Episode: "The Trial of Elizabeth Gadge"	
2015	Lewis	Donald Lockston	Episode: "What Lies Tangled"	
2015–2016	The Amazing World of Gumball	Rob, Dr. Wrecker (voice)	5 episodes	
2016	Ripper Street	Rabbi Max Steiner	3 episodes	
2018	The Alienist	Professor Cavanaugh	Episode: "Hildebrandt's Starling"	
2020	Teen Titans Go!	The Lobe (voice)	Episode: "Huggbees"	

=== Audio dramas ===
Year	Title	Role	Notes	Ref.
2003	Doctor Who: Sympathy for the Devil	The Doctor		
2005	The Club of Queer Trades	Basil Grant	BBC Radio drama in six parts	
2007	Doctor Who: Circular Time	Sir Isaac Newton		
2008	Bernice Summerfield: The Adventure of the Diogenes Damsel	Mycroft Holmes		
2008	Doctor Who: Empathy Games	Coordinator Angell		
2008	Doctor Who: Masters of War	The Doctor		
2010	Dark Shadows: Kingdom of the Dead	Seraph	Four-part series	
2010	Doctor Who: Deimos	Prof. Schooner		
2010	Graceless	Daniel	Series 1	
2011	Doctor Who: The Children of Seth	Siris		
2011–2020	The Scarifyers	Harry Crow	BBC Radio 4 Extra	
2012	Doctor Who: The Rosemariners	Biggs		
2013	Doctor Who: The Sands of Life	Cuthbert		
2013	Doctor Who: War Against the Laan	Cuthbert		
2013	Doctor Who: The Dalek Contract, The Final Phase	Cuthbert		
2015	The Confessions of Dorian Gray: The Spirits of Christmas	Santa Claus		
2016	The New Adventures of Bernice Summerfield	The Doctor	Volume Three: The Unbound Universe	
2016	Doctor Who: The Pursuit of History, Casualties of Time	Cuthbert		
2016	Torchwood: Ghost Mission	OAP		
2016	The Torchwood Archive	The Committee		
2017	King Lear	King Lear		
2017	The New Adventures of Bernice Summerfield	The Doctor	Volume Four: Ruler of the Universe	
2018	Bernice Summerfield: The Story So Far: Volume Two	The Doctor		
2018	Shilling & Sixpence Investigate: Series One	Desmund Shilling		
2018	Jago & Litefoot Forever	Dr. Luke Betterman		
2019	The New Adventures of Bernice Summerfield	The Doctor	Volume Five: Buried Memories	
2019	Torchwood: God Among Us: Another Man's Shoes	The Committee		
2019	Torchwood: God Among Us: Eye of the Storm	The Committee		
2020	The New Adventures of Bernice Summerfield	The Doctor	Volume Six: Lost in Translation	
2021	The Box of Delights	Arnold of Todi		
2022	The New Adventures of Bernice Summerfield:	The Doctor	Volume Seven: Blood & Steel (posthumous release)	
2022	Shilling & Sixpence Investigate	Desmund Shilling	Series Two: In Loving Memory (posthumous release)	
2023	Doctor Who: Once and Future	The Doctor	Part 7: Time Lord Immemorial (posthumous release)	

=== Video games ===
Year	Title	Role	Notes	Ref.
1996	Privateer 2: The Darkening	Rhinehart	Live action	
1997	Fallout	Morpheus		
1999	Descent 3	Dravis		
2000	Star Wars: Force Commander	Grand General Brashin		
2000	Star Trek: Klingon Academy	Chancellor Gorkon	Live action	
2000	Baldur's Gate II: Shadows of Amn	Jon Irenicus		
2016	Baldur's Gate: Siege of Dragonspear	Jon Irenicus		

=== Audiobook narration ===
Year	Title	Author	Ref.
2013	Doctor Who: Plague of the Cybermen	Justin Richards	
2015	Doctor Who: Royal Blood	Una McCormack	
2015	Robinson Crusoe	Daniel Defoe	

== Awards and nominations ==
Year	Award	Category	Project	Result	Ref
1967	BAFTA Award	Best Actor in a Leading Role	Morgan: A Suitable Case for Treatment	Nominated	
1969	German Film Award for Best Actor in a Leading Role		Michael Kohlhaas - Der Rebell	Nominated	
1978	Primetime Emmy Award	Outstanding Supporting Actor in a Miniseries or Special	Holocaust	Nominated	
1979	Saturn Award	Best Supporting Actor	Time After Time	Nominated	
1981	Primetime Emmy Award	Outstanding Supporting Actor in a Miniseries or Special	Masada	Won	
1997	Screen Actors Guild Award	Outstanding Cast in a Motion Picture	Titanic	Nominated	
1999	Annie Awards	Outstanding Voice Acting by a Male Performer	Toonsylvania	Nominated	
2001	Annie Awards	Outstanding Voice Acting by a Male Performer	The New Batman Adventures	Nominated	

== See also ==
- List of British actors
- List of Primetime Emmy Award winners
