= Human sexual response =

Human sexual response or Sexual response may refer to:

- Human sexual arousal
- Human Sexual Response, a 1966 book by Masters and Johnson
- Human sexual response cycle, a four-stage model of physiological responses during sexual stimulation first described by Masters and Johnson
- Human sexual function
- Human Sexual Response (band), a new wave musical group from Boston, Massachusetts, United States
- Sexual Response (film), a 1992 American erotic thriller
