= Sexual Response (film) =

1992 film by Yaky Yosha

- Home video release poster
- Directed by: Yaky Yosha
- Written by: Brent Morris; Eric Diamond
- Produced by: Ashok Amritraj
- Starring: Shannon Tweed; Illana Shoshan; Catherine Oxenberg; Emile Levisetti; Vernon Wells; David Kriegel
- Cinematography: Ilan Rosenberg
- Edited by: David H. Lloyd
- Music by: Richard Berger
- Production company: Vision International
- Distributed by: Columbia TriStar Home Video
- Release date: December 5, 1992
- Running time: 90 minutes
- Country: United States
- Language: English

Sexual Response is a 1992 American erotic thriller directed by Yaky Yosha and starring Shannon Tweed, Illana Shoshan, Catherine Oxenberg, Emile Levisetti, Vernon Wells, and David Kriegel.

== Plot ==
Eve is a beautiful middle-aged woman who works as a host for the radio program Sexual Response. She is married to a wealthy man named Philip. But there is also a problem in her seemingly careless life—Eve is not completely happy in marriage as Philip perceives her only as minor part of his own valuable life. One day Eve meets Edge, a talented sculptor. Gradually, they fall in love and eventually become lovers. But Edge does not like the current situation and offers Eve to get rid of her husband. To do so, Edge even steals Philip's weapon.

Eve is trying to figure out the situation as a lot of things seem strange to her. Together with her friends Peter and Kate, she sneaks into the Edge's apartment. Eve wants to find out who Edge really is and what his past was. As a result, she finds out that her lover Edge and husband Philip are actually related.

== Cast ==
- Shannon Tweed as Eve
- Illana Shoshan as station staff
- Catherine Oxenberg as Kate
- Emile Levisetti as Edge
- Vernon Wells as Philip
- David Kriegel as Peter
