= Quest of the Delta Knights =

- VHS cover
- Directed by: James Dodson
- Written by: Redge Mahaffey
- Starring: David Warner; Corbin Allred; David Kriegel; Olivia Hussey
- Narrated by: David Warner
- Cinematography: James Dodson
- Edited by: Karen Lee Smith
- Music by: Carl Schurtz
- Release date: June 25, 1993
- Running time: 97 minutes
- Country: United States
- Language: English

Quest of the Delta Knights is a 1993 fantasy/adventure sword and sorcery film directed and shot by James Dodson. It was featured in a September 1998 episode of Mystery Science Theater 3000 (MST3K) and was one of only a few movies shown on the series that were made in the 1990s.

== Plot ==
The plot revolves around a young boy named Travis (nicknamed "Tee") who learns from his master that he is the key to saving the world from an evil plot. Tee joins the secret organization of the Delta Knights and embarks on a quest to attempt to recover the lost treasures inside the fabled Lost Storehouse of Archimedes.

== Anachronisms ==
The film displays extreme confusion with regard to setting, both in terms of time period and location. The story seems to take place in medieval England, although a number of plot elements contradict this. Vultare's henchmen wear headgear strongly resembling (stereotypical) Viking helmets. Baydool states that they are in the Dark Ages, yet firearms are inexplicably used. Leonardo da Vinci, a figure from Renaissance Italy, appears as a major character in the plot. Finally, Leonardo and Tee are searching for the lost storehouse of Archimedes, a figure from ancient Syracuse, Sicily, whose storehouse one might reasonably think unlikely to be found in England. A document held by Archimedes seen in a flashback is also clearly held together by staples.

These anachronisms served as fodder for the cast of Mystery Science Theater 3000: Mike Nelson riffing "Sultans! Pirates! After them!" as the protagonists are fleeing from questionably dressed guards, Tom Servo has a choir that sings about the Delta Knights who "live in Europe somewhere" and "they don't get historical facts just right", and Leonardo da Vinci (played by Bill Corbett) ridicules the "bad movie" and pointing out that the film's depiction of him is a "mook" who is nothing like him.

== Filming locations ==
A large portion of this movie was filmed at the Renaissance Pleasure Faire in Black Point, Novato, California. Performers from the Faire were employed as extras in various scenes throughout. Exterior scenes of Archimedes' storehouse were filmed at the Palace of Fine Arts, San Francisco, California. Exterior scenes of the prison were filmed at Petaluma Adobe State Historic Park, Petaluma, California. Some interior scenes of the Mannerjay's palace were filmed at the Scottish Rite Temple, Oakland, California.

== Cast ==
- David Warner as Baydool / Lord Vultare / Narrator
- Corbin Allred as Tee
- Olivia Hussey as The Mannerjay
- David Kriegel as Leonardo
- Brigid Brannagh as Thena
- Sarah Douglas as Madam Maaydeed
- Richard Kind as Wamthool

== Production ==
David Warner was originally intended to play only one character in the movie but suggested that he could play two roles for the same cost.

== Reception ==
Jim Craddock, author of VideoHound's Golden Movie Retriever, gave the movie two and half stars.

In a 2017 interview with The A.V. Club, David Warner expressed his enjoyment in being in Quest of the Delta Knights, followed by his amusement at the film being featured on Mystery Science Theater 3000.

== Mystery Science Theater 3000 ==
Quest of the Delta Knights was featured as episode #913 of Mystery Science Theater 3000. The episode debuted September 26, 1998, on the Sci-Fi Channel. The episode is notable for series antagonist Pearl Forrester replacing series host Mike Nelson in watching and mocking the movie for one segment.

In his rankings of the first twelve seasons of MST3K, Paste writer Jim Vorel placed the episode in the top third, at #59. (Note: Ranking based on 197 episodes as of 2018.) Vorel calls the movie "a strange fantasy adventure" that "inexplicably" features David Warner in three roles. He also notes the "scattershot" historical settings, which can't agree where or when the movie is set. In Vorel's opinion, the episode is not quite as good as the similar Deathstalker and the Warriors from Hell.

The MST3K version of Quest of the Delta Knights has not been released on DVD. The segments of the episode that take place outside of the movie theater were included in the "Satellite Dishes" disc in Mystery Science Theater 3000: Volume XXXIX, which was released October 31, 2017. The episode has been officially licensed and re-released on streaming since August 1, 2020.

== See also ==
- Cultural references to Leonardo da Vinci
