= David Kriegel =

American actor (born 1969)

- Born: New York
- Occupation: Actor
- Years active: 1990–2005

David Kriegel (born in 1969 in New York) is a retired American actor.

== Career ==
He played supporting roles in such films as Alive, Speed and Leaving Las Vegas. At the time of Speed’s 20th anniversary Kriegel owned a unique children’s dance studio with his wife in Studio City. In Quest of the Delta Knights he played Leonardo da Vinci.

== Filmography ==
- Slumber Party Massacre 3 (1990)
- Sexual Response (1992)
- Alive as Gustavo Zerbino (1993)
- Quest of the Delta Knights as Leonardo da Vinci (1993)
- Speed (1994)
- Sleep with Me (1994)
- Leaving Las Vegas as hotel manager (1995)
