= Yaky Yosha =

Israeli film director (born 1951)

- יקי יושע
- Born: April 17, 1951 (age 75); Tel Aviv, Israel
- Occupations: Film director, screenwriter, film editor
- Years active: 1968-present
- Website: www.yakyyosha.com

Yaky Yosha (Hebrew: יקי יושע; born April 17, 1951) is a film director from Israel, known for realism. Yosha’s films have often stirred social controversy in his homeland and outside of it. About his work Yosha once said: "Art only as Aesthetics is meaningless. As an artist, I am trying to grasp the meaning of life. I ask questions related to myself and to the country in which I was born. I am trying to make movies and thus to find the answers. God knows if I’ll ever find them…" His films were shown at Cannes, IDFA, Locarno and other international film festivals.

== Biography ==
Yaky Yosha was born in Tel Aviv in 1951. In his youth, he created several shorts including The End (1968) with The Doors' song of the same name as its soundtrack, and The Killers (1970), based on a story by Hemingway.

In 1972 Yosha directed Shalom, his first feature film. The movie was independently produced and most of the cast and crew were personal friends. Young Yosha acted in the lead role while his wife, Dorit, who produced the film, played the female lead. Due to financial difficulties, the production extended for over a year. A similar period was needed for editing, and finally "the first and probably last Israeli hippie film," was completed. Shalom was considered prophetic, and regarded as the first political Israeli film ever made. Released immediately following the Yom Kippur War (1973), the film was a flop at the box office.

Yosha's second film, Rockinghorse (1978), is considered one of the masterpieces of Israeli cinema, and was the first film to represent Israel in the Directors’ Fortnight at Cannes Film Festival. The movie went on to premiere in film festivals around the globe, and took home the special jury prize and best actor award in the Oxford International Film Festival.

The Vulture (1981) dealt with the problematic "Industry of Death that lies behind Israel's wars". The film provoked great controversy among the Israeli public, which felt the film has crossed a blood-red line. The Israeli censors cut “The Vulture”, but when selected to represent Israel in the Cannes Film Festival, it was screened abroad in its uncut version.

A year later, Yosha directed Dead End Street, inspired by the true story of a young prostitute who took part in the making of the documentary about her efforts to abandon the streets, only to commit suicide hours before the film was broadcast. Bruce Springsteen agreed to contribute three songs to the soundtrack for free. Like Yosha's previous two films, Dead end Street also represented Israel at Cannes.

Summertime Blues, released in 1984, is a movie about youth, about the last summer vacation right before the army, in the dawn of the Lebanon war, about the beach, bikes, girls and rock and roll.

In the mid-1980s Yosha landed in Los Angeles, and in 1992 he directed the erotic-thriller Sexual Response, starring Shannon Tweed and Catharine Oxenberg, distributed by Colombia TriStar.

In 1995, upon his return to Israel, Yosha focused on writing and directing for television. He wrote and directed the drama series, Night Fare, as well as two movies made for television Joint and Junky. In 1997, he returned to the big screen with Bloodguilt, a dark tale of a dangerous romantic triangle based on the biblical story of Jacob, Rachel and Leah. The following year, Yosha directed Shabazi, a feature film based on the television series Night Fare. In 1999 he joined police patrol cars, documenting pursuits, arrests, and all the moments in between. Those nights became the Israeli version of Cops.

In 2000 Yosha directed a feature-length documentary, Inherit the Earth, narrated by Liam Neeson, about the preparations for the Pope's historic visit to Israel. During the making of Inherit the Earth, Yosha met major general Alik Ron, the Israeli northern district police chief, who became the subject of his next documentary The Main Suspect (2002), selected to the International Documentary Film Festival (Amsterdam) in 2003.

Between the years 2003-2005 Yosha directed four documentaries about a Christian sect that lives according to the principles of Christ's first followers.

"Still Walking", Yaky Yosha's first novel was published in Hebrew in March 2008. His latest feature "Walking" premiered in 2010. According to Yosha: "Still Walking is going to be Shalom's older brother, and show the same youngsters pondering over the social and political state they live in, when they're a generation older. The film, following the book, will track them down when all is without hope." Yaky yosha said that he does not intend to bring social change with this film and that he had long forsaken the idea that art can fix anything. He was also cited calling this film mere lament to a country that has lost its path to militarism and cruelty.

== Filmography ==
- 1968 "Peace and…" 15 Min. (director, writer, actor)
- 1969 "The End" 20 Min. (director, writer, actor)
- 1970 "The Killers" 45 Min. (director, writer)
- 1973 "Shalom" 80 Min. (director, writer, actor, composer)
- 1978 "Rocking Horse" 90 Min. (director, writer, editor)
- 1981 "The Vulture" 92 Min. (director, writer, editor)
- 1982 "Dead End Street" 90 Min. (director, writer)
- 1984 "Summertime Blues" 90 Min. (director, writer, editor)
- 1992 "Sexual Response" 90 Min. (director)
- 1995-1997 "Night Fare" TV Series 25 Min.X13 Ep. (Series 1: director, writer. Series 2: director, writer, editor)
- 1997 "Joint" 30 Min. (director, writer)
- 1997 "Junky" 50 Min. (director, writer)
- 1998 "Bloodguilt" 85 Min. (director, writer)
- 1997 "Shabazi" 90 Min. (director, writer, editor)
- 1999-2000 "Israeli Cops" Documentary TV Series 30 Min.X12 Ep.(director, editor)
- 2001 "Inherit the Earth" 80 Min. (director, writer, editor)
- 2003 "The Main Suspect" 60 Min. (director, writer, editor, narrator)
- 2003 "God Provides" (director, writer, editor)
- 2004 "For the love of my brothers and friends" (director, editor)
- 2004 "Salt of the Earth" (director, editor)
- 2006 "Lior" 15 Min. (director, writer, editor)
- 2010 "I Am Still Walking (film)" 90 min. (director, writer, editor)

== Books ==
- Still Walking (I am Still Walking), the base of the film with the same name
