= Summertime Blues (1984 film) =

1984 Israeli film directed by Yaky Yosha

- DVD cover
- Directed by: Yaky Yosha
- Written by: Yaky Yosha
- Produced by: Alex Hacohen; David Shapira
- Starring: Yuval Banai; Anat Atzmon; Eyal Geffen; Shimon Israeli; Tali Kaufmann; Rivka Michaeli; Yaron London
- Music by: Shmulik Kraus
- Release date: 1984
- Running time: 90 minutes
- Country: Israel
- Language: Hebrew

Director Yaky Yosha's Summertime Blues (1984) is a youth drama about the last summer before the army, the last summer altogether.

Although somewhat similar in content to the Lemon Popsicle (Eskimo Limon) series, with a soundtrack full of rock and roll hits and a group of teens pursuing sex, it is a different film than the eighth Lemon Popsicle film four years later, which unfortunately was given the same sub-title – Lemon Popsicle VIII - Summertime Blues.

== Plot ==
It is the last summer before the army, an early 1980s Tel-Aviv summer, prior to the 1982 Lebanon War. Four friends are walking on the wild side before life starts walking over them. They have a Rock'n'Roll band and so, they're trying to add some sex and drugs and devour the whole enchilada. It will take them a hot summer to realize how young and naive they still are, how what really turns them on is first love, first heartache and everything in between. The original ending titles shows the protagonists' photos with information on those that died in service.

== Production ==
Yosha decided to cast a young, inexperienced actor for the lead role. After attending a performance by the band "Mashina" at the "Penguin" club in Tel Aviv, he offered Yuval Banai the lead role. Filming began in late October 1983 with a budget of $25,000 and was completed in January 1984.

== Theme song ==
The theme song was written by Shmulik Kraus and Yankele Rotblit and performed by Yuval Banai, who played the lead role. About 20 years after the film's release, the song was re-recorded in two versions: an electro version by Spark-O, Nico-Tin, and Roy "Chicky" Arad, and an acoustic version by Noam Rotem.

Another song in the film, "Kor Klavim" (Freezing Cold), is performed by rock singer Libi Hart and her backing band, The Flash.
