= Jaheira =

Fictional character from the Baldur's Gate series

- Baldur's Gate character
- Render of Jaheira's character model from Baldur's Gate 3
- First appearance: Baldur's Gate (1998)
- Voiced by: Heidi Shannon; Tracy Wiles (Baldur's Gate 3)

In-universe information
- Species: Half-elf
- Affiliation: The Harpers
- Spouse: Khalid

Jaheira is a fictional character in the Baldur's Gate series of role-playing video games. A half-elf warrior druid associated with The Harpers, she first appeared as a recruitable companion in BioWare's 1998 video game Baldur's Gate. Jaheira's subsequent appearances include Baldur's Gate II: Shadows of Amn and its expansion Throne of Bhaal, Beamdog's Baldur's Gate: Siege of Dragonspear, and Larian Studios' Baldur's Gate 3.

Heidi Shannon voiced Jaheira in the original BioWare games, while Tracy Wiles portrayed her in Baldur's Gate 3. Initially introduced alongside her husband Khalid as a guardian figure by the player character's foster father Gorion, Jaheira's characterization was substantially expanded in Shadows of Amn: Khalid's death becomes the basis of a storyline concerning grief, responsibility and her conflicted relationship with the Harpers. A male player character may also develop a romance with her; the romance involving Jaheira formed part of BioWare's early experimentation with long-form relationships between player characters and companions. Jaheira's dialogue in Shadows of Amn exceeded that of all the recruitable companions in the first game combined, while the integration of her romance and personal quest was the source of significant technical problems during the game's development.

Jaheira has been identified by critics as one of BioWare's notable companion characters. Her return in Baldur's Gate 3 and Wiles's performance received critical attention; Wiles was nominated for the 2024 BAFTA Games Award for Performer in a Supporting Role.

== Concept and development ==
In the first Baldur's Gate, Jaheira was one of twenty-five recruitable companions. Although the characters possessed recognizable personalities and occasional dialogue, their interactions and personal histories were comparatively limited. According to PC Gamer, lead designer James Ohlen became dissatisfied with that approach after playing Final Fantasy VII, whose greater emphasis on character relationships made the companions in BioWare's game appear underdeveloped by comparison. BioWare consequently reduced the number of recruitable companions in Baldur's Gate II and gave the remaining characters more extensive dialogue, personal quests and relationships with one another. Jaheira's response to Khalid's death became one of the clearest examples of the transition from the original game's broadly drawn companions to characters whose emotional circumstances developed throughout the sequel.

Lukas Kristjanson was a key writer for Jaheira's storyline. He estimated that the character's dialogue in Baldur's Gate II may have contained more words than all twenty-four companions from the original game combined. The scale of her material reflected the sequel's wider script, which contained approximately 1.8 million words.

=== Personal quest and romance ===
Jaheira's personal quest concerns her relationship with the Harpers, the organization to which she and Khalid belong. Khalid's death in Baldur's Gate II changes Jaheira's position within the party. She attempts to maintain her practical and authoritative manner while grieving and questioning whether she could have prevented his death. Her loyalty to the group is tested after its local representatives question her judgment and treatment of the player character. Her conflict with the Harper leadership in Baldur's Gate II further places her between institutional duty and personal loyalty. Kristjanson combined this plot with Jaheira's optional romance, so choices made during romantic conversations could alter the progression and outcome of her Harper storyline.

The optional romance content extends this tension by requiring her to reconcile her attachment to the protagonist with her memory of Khalid. The romance subplot with Jaheira was itself an experimental feature. Designer David Gaider recalled that Ohlen was uncertain whether players of a combat-focused role-playing game would be interested in prolonged romantic storylines. Jaheira's technical problems contributed to the cancellation of planned romances involving Valygar and Haer'Dalis, while the completed game retained relationships with Jaheira, Aerie, Viconia and Anomen.

BioWare used a visualization program called Dotty to map branching conversations, but Kristjanson said that the combination of timers, romance conditions and personal-quest triggers caused the program to fail when processing Jaheira's dialogue. The resulting structure became one of the development team's most difficult dialogue systems; the number of unresolved problems associated with her storyline reportedly led Ohlen to place a sign on his office door stating, "If it's about Jaheira, don't knock."

=== Later portrayals ===
For Siege of Dragonspear, writer Amber Scott sought to expand the portrayal of Jaheira and Khalid's marriage. Scott considered some of Jaheira's earlier dialogue to be indicative of a argumentative wife stereotype, and wrote an optional sequence in which the two characters discuss their feelings for one another openly and in a tender manner. Beamdog attempted to contact Heidi Shannon to reprise the role of Jaheira for Siege of Dragonspear, but they were unable to locate her.

Larian Studios brought Jaheira back for Baldur's Gate 3. Lead writer Adam Smith described her as the returning character most important to him personally. Tracy Wiles began recording for the role in January 2022, and Larian announced her casting in December of that year.

== Appearances ==
=== Baldur's Gate ===
In Baldur's Gate, Jaheira is presented as a half-elven fighter and druid who is direct, disciplined and frequently critical of what she considers irresponsible behaviour. Jaheira and her husband Khalid wait at the Friendly Arm Inn after being appointed by the protagonist's foster father, Gorion to act as guardians for his ward. They may join the protagonist's party and remain available throughout the investigation of a conspiracy affecting the Sword Coast. Jaheira is inseparable from Khalid; if one leaves or is removed the party, the other will follow suit. As members of the Harpers, they are fundamentally opposed to the Zhentarim agents Montaron and Xzar, which will escalate into hostilities if they are kept in the same party for too long.

=== Baldur's Gate II ===
At the beginning of Shadows of Amn, Jaheira, the protagonist, Imoen and Minsc have been imprisoned by the mage Jon Irenicus. During their escape, Jaheira discovers Khalid's mutilated body and concludes that he was tortured and killed by Irenicus. She remains with the protagonist during the pursuit of Irenicus and the effort to rescue Imoen.

Her personal quest places her in conflict with a faction of the Harpers that considers the protagonist a dangerous Bhaalspawn. Depending on the player's choices, Jaheira may reject the faction's authority and reaffirm her own understanding of the organization's principles. A male protagonist of a compatible race may also pursue a romance with her, which continues into Throne of Bhaal.

In Throne of Bhaal, Jaheira continues accompanying the protagonist during the conflict among Bhaal's remaining children. Her ending varies according to whether her romance was completed, but she generally continues serving the Harpers and attempting to preserve balance between civilization and the natural world.

=== Siege of Dragonspear ===
Jaheira and Khalid return in Siege of Dragonspear, whose events take place between the first and second games. They join the coalition pursuing the crusade led by Caelar Argent. The game includes additional conversations concerning their marriage and an optional quest in which the player helps Khalid prepare a gift for Jaheira.

=== Baldur's Gate 3 ===
Jaheira returns in Larian Studios' Baldur's Gate 3. Initially encountered in the game's second act, she is presented as a local leader of a subset of the Harpers, who are protecting refugees from a swath of darkness that has contaminated the region where the act takes place. Jaheira leads an attempt to stop the act's villain, Ketheric Thorm, who had set up base in a fortress known as Moonrise Towers. Nearing the end of the act, she becomes a party member and attacks the Moonrise Towers with the player's help, potentially dying in the process.

Assuming she survives, she remains available as a companion in the game's third and final act. After locating a secret Harper base in the city of Baldur's Gate, the player may pursue Jaheira's personal quest. This quest revolves around Jaheira's efforts to locate returning character Minsc, who has been mind-controlled by the game's main villain, the Absolute. To complete the mission, the player must incapacitate Minsc without killing him, which then allows the player to follow Jaheira's advice and break the Absolute's control over Minsc. If the player decides to kill Minsc instead, Jaheira permanently leaves the party.

== Reception and legacy ==
Retrospective accounts of BioWare's development of Baldur's Gate II by video game journalists have used Jaheira as an example of the studio's transition toward companion-centred storytelling. In the Baldur's Gate II edition of Boss Fight Books, author Matt Bell presents Jaheira's storyline in the game as an example of how Baldur's Gate II uses extended companion dialogue to create emotional attachment between the player and party members. He treats Khalid's death and Jaheira's reaction to it as part of the emotional foundation of the sequel's opening. Wolens identified her grief after Khalid's death as one of the storylines that distinguished the more fully developed companions of Baldur's Gate II from the comparatively limited cast of the first game.

The scale of Jaheira's dialogue, the integration of her personal and romantic storylines and the resulting technical problems have also made the character a recurring case study in discussions of the sequel's cast of characters and its ambitious development. Robert Zak described her as a co-icon of the series with Minsc and treated her storyline as a microcosm of a game whose writers repeatedly expanded their ideas beyond the capabilities of their tools and schedule. Zak noted that although the developers were uncertain that players would value romance, relationship systems became a recurring component of the studio's later games, including the Dragon Age and Mass Effect series. Kimberley Wallace included Jaheira in Game Informer's selection of BioWare's best characters. Wallace described Jaheira as headstrong, confident and willing to act rather than wait for others to resolve a problem. She also highlighted the contrast between Jaheira's blunt manner and her concern for the protagonist, particularly after the character confronts Khalid's death in Baldur's Gate II. She praised Jaheira's forcefulness, confidence and concern for the protagonist, and considered the character's confrontation with Khalid's death one of her most effective moments.

Jaheira's return in Baldur's Gate 3 received substantial commentary. Writing for PC Gamer, Fraser Brown praised the preservation and development of her established characterization, although he questioned whether the sequel made sufficiently distinctive use of the returning character. In a staff ranking of the game's characters, writers for PC Gamer praised Jaheira's characterization, humour and voice acting, while some contributors placed her below other members of the cast. Robin Bea of Inverse similarly called Jaheira a strong returning character whose continued presence would appeal to longtime players, but considered her less accessible to those unfamiliar with the earlier games. Madeline Carpou of The Mary Sue praised Jaheira's attitude, accent and visual presentation, describing her scenes as consistently enjoyable. Carpou nevertheless ranked her below several newer characters because Jaheira had already received extensive development in the earlier games.

Wiles's performance received formal recognition when she was nominated for Performer in a Supporting Role at the 20th British Academy Games Awards. Other nominees in the category included Andrew Wincott for Raphael in Baldur's Gate 3, Debra Wilson, Ralph Ineson, Sam Lake and Tony Todd.
