= Minsc =

- Baldur's Gate character
- Minsc as he appears in Baldur's Gate 3
- First game: Baldur's Gate (1998)
- Voiced by: Jim Cummings; Matthew Mercer (Baldur's Gate 3)

In-universe information
- Class: Ranger
- Alignment: Neutral Good (Baldur's Gate); Chaotic Good (Baldur's Gate II)
- Home: Rashemen

Minsc (/ˈmɪnsk/) is a fictional character in the Baldur's Gate series of Dungeons & Dragons role-playing video games. He first appeared as a recruitable companion in BioWare's Baldur's Gate, and later appeared in Baldur's Gate II: Shadows of Amn, Baldur's Gate II: Throne of Bhaal, Baldur's Gate: Siege of Dragonspear, and Larian Studios' Baldur's Gate 3. He is accompanied by Boo, a hamster whom Minsc believes to be a "miniature giant space hamster". Jim Cummings voiced Minsc in the earlier games, while Matthew Mercer voiced him in Baldur's Gate 3.

Minsc originated in a tabletop Dungeons & Dragons campaign run by Baldur's Gate lead designer James Ohlen. The character was conceived as an unstable but good-hearted ranger and was expanded for the video games by writer Lukas Kristjanson. He is characterized by an exaggerated devotion to heroism, frequent battle cries, great physical strength, emotional sincerity and apparent mental instability.

Minsc became one of the most recognised characters associated with the original Baldur's Gate games. Contemporary publications described him as a favourite among players, while later commentators have called him one of BioWare's most beloved characters and the series' de facto mascot.

== Concept and development ==
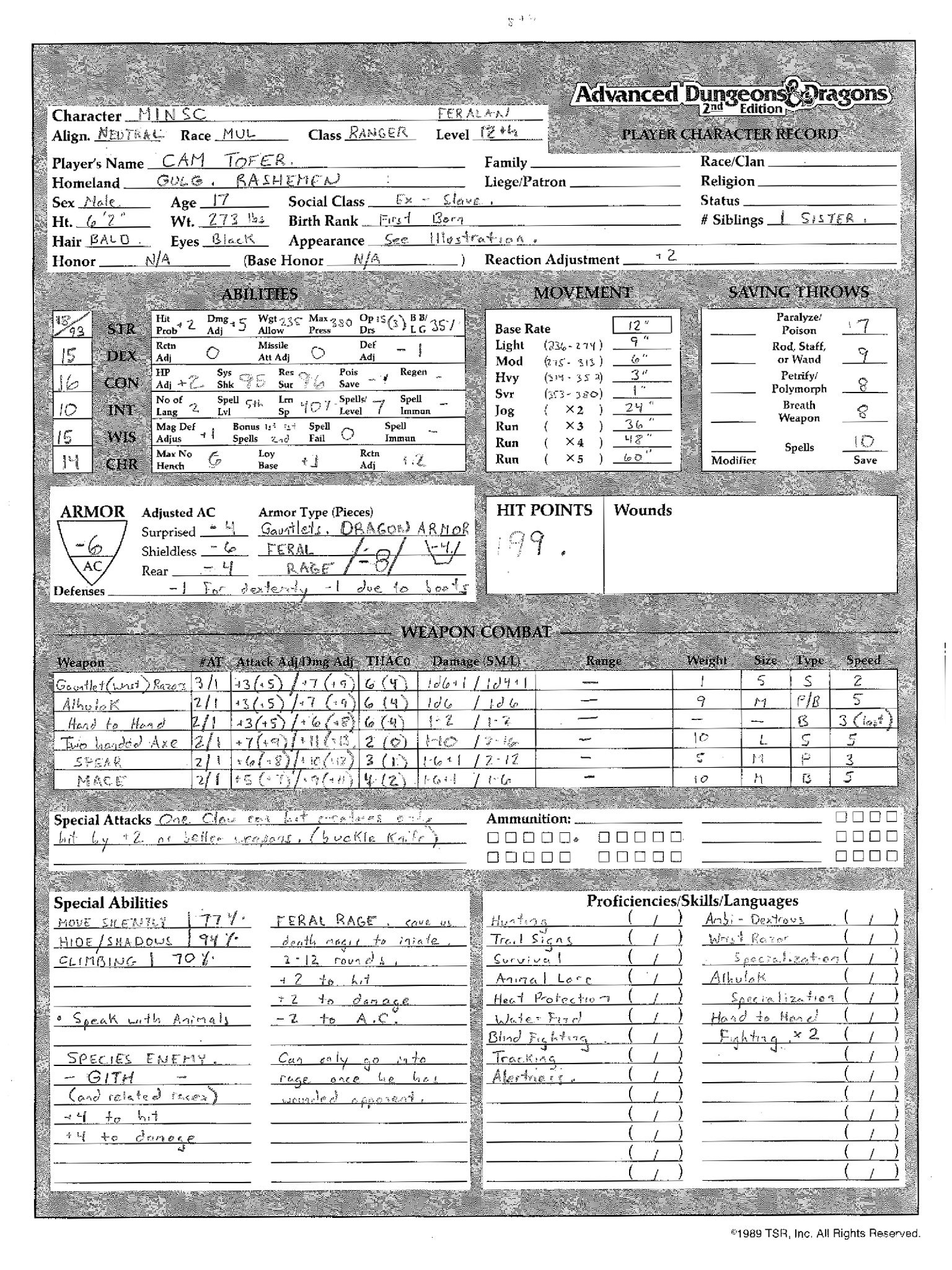
A copy of the original tabletop Dungeons & Dragons game character sheet for Minsc.

Minsc and Boo originated in tabletop Dungeons & Dragons sessions held by Ohlen. The character was played by BioWare developer Cameron Tofer and conceived as an unstable comic-relief ranger carrying a pet hamster during a campaign using the Dark Sun setting. Kristjanson adapted Minsc for Baldur's Gate, expanding his dialogue and developing his humorous personality and relationship with Boo.

The appearance of Minsc in Baldur's Gate II, along with a number of other returning companions, were part of the continuity linking the sequel's opening to the player's earlier adventures. During development of Baldur's Gate II, some of Minsc's dialogue was rewritten around Cummings's readings. The writers found that his distinctive delivery allowed them to add lines while maintaining a recognisable tone for the character. BioWare co-founder Ray Muzyka later named Minsc as his favourite character from the company's completed games at that time.

Boo's description as a miniature giant space hamster derives from the Dungeons & Dragons Spelljammer setting. Its source material describes giant hamsters bred to power spelljamming vessels and miniature varieties that resemble ordinary hamsters. BioWare writer David Gaider said that Boo had no abilities beyond those of a normal hamster and was not used as a combat familiar because of the animal's fragility and the effect that Boo's death would have on Minsc. Drew Karpyshyn described Boo's role as providing Minsc with wisdom and moral support.

When asked whether Minsc and Boo might appear in later BioWare games, Throne of Bhaal lead developer Kevin Martens responded in a 2001 developer chat log that both the developers and players liked the character, while declining to confirm a future appearance.

== Appearances ==
=== Baldur's Gate series ===
In Baldur's Gate, Minsc is a ranger and berserker from Rashemen undertaking his dajemma, a rite of passage required for entry into the Ice Dragon Berserker Lodge. He has sworn to protect the witch Dynaheir, but the two are separated when she is captured by gnolls. Minsc asks the player character, Gorion's Ward, to rescue her, after which both characters may join the party opposing Sarevok.

At the beginning of Shadows of Amn, Minsc, Gorion's Ward, Imoen and Jaheira are imprisoned by the mage Jon Irenicus. Dynaheir has been killed during their captivity, leaving Minsc determined to avenge her. He can remain in the player's party throughout Shadows of Amn and Throne of Bhaal.

The epilogue of Throne of Bhaal states that Minsc returned to Rashemen, was welcomed into the berserker lodge as a hero and formed an adventuring company called the Justice Fist. He continued travelling and fighting evil before eventually disappearing during a later journey across the Realms.

Minsc returns in Siege of Dragonspear, which takes place between the first two games. In Baldur's Gate 3, he has survived for more than a century after being transformed into a statue and later restored. Under the influence of an illithid parasite and a doppelganger impersonating Jaheira, he operates in Baldur's Gate under the identity of the Stone Lord. The player may free him from this control and recruit him as a companion.

=== Appearances in other media ===
Minsc appears in Philip Athans's 2000 novelization of Shadows of Amn. The novel substantially redesigns him, depicting him with long red hair, a beard and a facial scar, and gives him a smaller role than in the video game. Boo remains with him and continues to be identified by Minsc as a miniature giant space hamster.

Minsc and Boo appeared in the Elemental Evil expansion for the MMORPG Neverwinter.

Boo was adapted into the webcomic Megatokyo, in which he wears wings and serves as the conscience of Largo, a character who adopts several of Minsc's mannerisms. Muzyka praised the comic's portrayal of Boo, and plush toys based on the design were later sold through the comic's merchandise store.

Minsc became the central returning character in IDW Publishing's Dungeons & Dragons: Legends of Baldur's Gate, written by Jim Zub and illustrated by Max Dunbar and Sarah Stone. The comic is set generations after Throne of Bhaal and continued Minsc's story beyond the chronology of the original video games.

Minsc was depicted as a legendary creature card in the 2021 Magic: The Gathering set Dungeons & Dragons: Adventures in the Forgotten Realms.

== References in other media ==
Minsc and Boo have also been referenced in a wide variety of games and media.

=== BioWare references ===
In Dragon Age: Origins, the loading screen sometimes displays the advice "If all else fails, go for the eyes". In Dragon Age Legends, random NPC's use "Go for the eyes!" as a battle cry. In Mass Effect 2, a "space hamster" is available for purchase. It gives the player a "knowing smile" when observed. One of the game's non-playable characters, Tali, shouts "Go for the optics!" to her combat drone. In Mass Effect 3 Citadel DLC, Commander Shepard finds their hamster being thrown out by one of their foes, and tells the hamster "Sit tight, little guy. If anyone gives you trouble, go for the eyes!"

=== Other references and allusions ===
In Neverwinter Nights 2: Mask of the Betrayer, an "Astral Rodent totem" can be found, with the words "For M" carved on it.

In Guild Wars Nightfall, "Go for the eyes!" is the name of a shout command skill used by the Paragon class. (Note: The Guild Wars wiki entry for "Go for the eyes!" credits the 1981 film Clash of the Titans where Perseus tells flying owl Bubo to "Go for the eye!")

In July 2014, a comic Dungeons & Dragons: Legends of Baldur’s Gate was announced for October 2014 release. It's set generations after Throne of Bhaal and features Minsc as the main character. It's written by Jim Zub and pencilled by Max Dunbar. It's part of the Dungeons & Dragons 40th anniversary celebrations.

On March 8, 2015 at PAX East in Boston, Massachusetts, Minsc was used as an NPC "intern" of the player characters in the "Acquisitions Incorporated" celebrity Dungeons & Dragons session, to the apparent delight of players Jerry Holkins and Patrick Rothfuss.

In March 2015, Wizkids provided a limited edition promotional card and die of Minsc and Boo as part of their Dungeons & Dragons Dice Masters set Battle for Faerûn.

In July 2017, Wizkids released their seventh D&D Icons of the Realms miniature sets, which features a miniature of Minsc (with Boo sitting on his shoulders) as a Medium-sized and of 'Rare' rarity rating piece of the set.

In the 2017 game Torment: Tides of Numenera, the player can, under certain circumstances obtain a rodent-like creature named Bao which grants one fighting bonuses at the expense of intelligence, along with an ability to blind enemies.

In July 2021, Minsc was depicted on a Magic: The Gathering trading card in the Dungeons & Dragons themed set Adventures in the Forgotten Realms.

== Promotion and merchandise ==
Kristjanson portrayed Minsc in an in-character promotional interview published by GameSpy, in which the character discussed his background and relationship with Boo.

Minsc and Boo have also been used in licensed tabletop products. Wizards of the Coast published Minsc and Boo's Journal of Villainy, a supplement featuring several characters and locations associated with the original Baldur's Gate games.

== Reception and legacy ==
=== Critical reception ===
Minsc received favourable attention around the release of the original games. An IGN preview identified his return as one of the anticipated features of Baldur's Gate II. Computer Games Magazine described him as a favourite among players of the first game, attributing his popularity to his combat usefulness and appealing personality. The magazine also referred to him as "everyone's favorite lovable oaf" and praised his early presence in the sequel.

Minsc placed seventh in a readers' edition of GameSpot's "Ten Best Sidekicks" in 2000, which attributed his appeal to his personality and attachment to Boo. Eurogamer named Minsc the best male supporting character in video games for 2001 and described him as one of the most popular characters from the original Baldur's Gate.

Later publications continued to single him out. Empire ranked Minsc and Boo among its greatest video-game characters, noting the nostalgia the pair inspired among players of older PC role-playing games. Kimberley Wallace of Game Informer included Minsc among BioWare's best characters, emphasizing the eccentricity of his relationship with Boo. A 2017 PC Gamer feature also selected Minsc as a member of one of the publication's preferred role-playing-game parties.

Andy Kelly of PC Gamer opined that although Minsc is less nuanced than many other companion characters that appear in later video games developed by BioWare, he argued that the character compensated through personality, comic delivery and emotional sincerity. Kelly highlighted Minsc's grief over Dynaheir's death as evidence that the character could function as more than comic relief.

Matt Bell similarly treats Minsc as one of the returning companions through whom Baldur's Gate II reconnects the player with the first game's cast. Bell discusses Minsc's reintroduction in Irenicus's dungeon and the revelation that Dynaheir was killed during the party's captivity, which gives Minsc a personal motive for pursuing Irenicus. Bell uses Minsc as an example of how players can add psychological detail to comparatively broad role-playing-game characters. He describes repeated gameplay incidents in which Minsc died while acting as the party's frontline fighter, and explains that these events encouraged him to imagine motives and character traits beyond those explicitly provided by the game's script.

In a 2012 instalment of his Baldur's Gate: Enhanced Edition play diary, Andrei Dumitrescu of Softpedia devoted the entry to a playthrough in which he killed Minsc and Edwin, making the two characters' deaths the central event of the article.

=== Legacy ===
Minsc's lasting recognition has been associated with Boo, his battle cries and his combination of comic exaggeration with sincere heroism. Kelly described Minsc as one of BioWare's most beloved characters, and that the audience's response to Minsc in the first game led BioWare to give him more dialogue and emotional depth in Baldur's Gate II. Kelly noted that his dialogue had become part of role-playing-game culture and treated him as representative of the anarchic humour of the original games.

Reporting on his return in Baldur's Gate 3, PC Gamer described Minsc as possibly the best-known companion from the original games. Fraser Brown later called him the Baldur's Gate series' de facto mascot, associating his appeal with his optimism, shouting, heroic enthusiasm and devotion to Boo.

The character's use in Neverwinter, comics, tabletop supplements, trading cards and other licensed media extended him beyond his original role as a recruitable companion. His starring role in Legends of Baldur's Gate in particular established him as a recurring Forgotten Realms character rather than solely a figure from the BioWare games.

A 2025 PC Gamer retrospective included Minsc among the companions whose personalities and relationships formed the emotional legacy of Baldur's Gate II. The article grouped him with Imoen, Jaheira, Mazzy and Viconia as the figurative friends the writer had made through the game.

== Bibliography ==
- Bell, Matt (2015). Baldur's Gate II: Shadows of Amn. Boss Fight Books. ISBN 978-1-940535-08-1.
