= Shalom (film) =

Shalom (Wayfarer's Prayer)
- Directed by: Yaky Yosha
- Written by: Yaky Yosha
- Produced by: Dorit Yosha; Orgad Vardimon
- Starring: Yaky Yosha; Dorit Yosha; Irit Mohar; Nisim Azikary; Israel Gurion
- Music by: Yaky Yosha
- Distributed by: Yaky Yosha Ltd.
- Release date: 1973
- Running time: 80 minutes
- Country: Israel
- Language: Hebrew

Shalom is a 1973 Israeli film, marking the first feature film by director Yaki Yosha who also wrote and stars in it.

Hailed by critics as "the first and probably last Israeli hippie film", the film attempts to answer the dilemmas and distresses Israeli youth in the pre-Yom Kippur War.

== Plot ==
Shalom, a young Israeli at the outset of his life, was born into a bourgeois family in Tel-Aviv. His parents wish he would go to college, but Shalom is no fan of studying. His father is not quite convinced his beloved son is doing the best he can when not doing anything at all. Shalom has a dilapidated station-wagon, two girlfriends to ride and love and "don't think twice, it's all right", as one of them sings to her sweet babbling infant. Shalom goes out on the road looking for his own self – an Israeli easy rider. In his wandering he comes across a group of artists debating over Israel's social-political fate. War and peace, occupied territories and settlements, rich and poor. One thing is not up for discussion, the future doesn't seem bright. Shalom makes up his mind to leave it all and go to America. Makes up his mind, but stays.
