= Miri Nishri =

Israeli interdisciplinary artist

- מירי נשרי
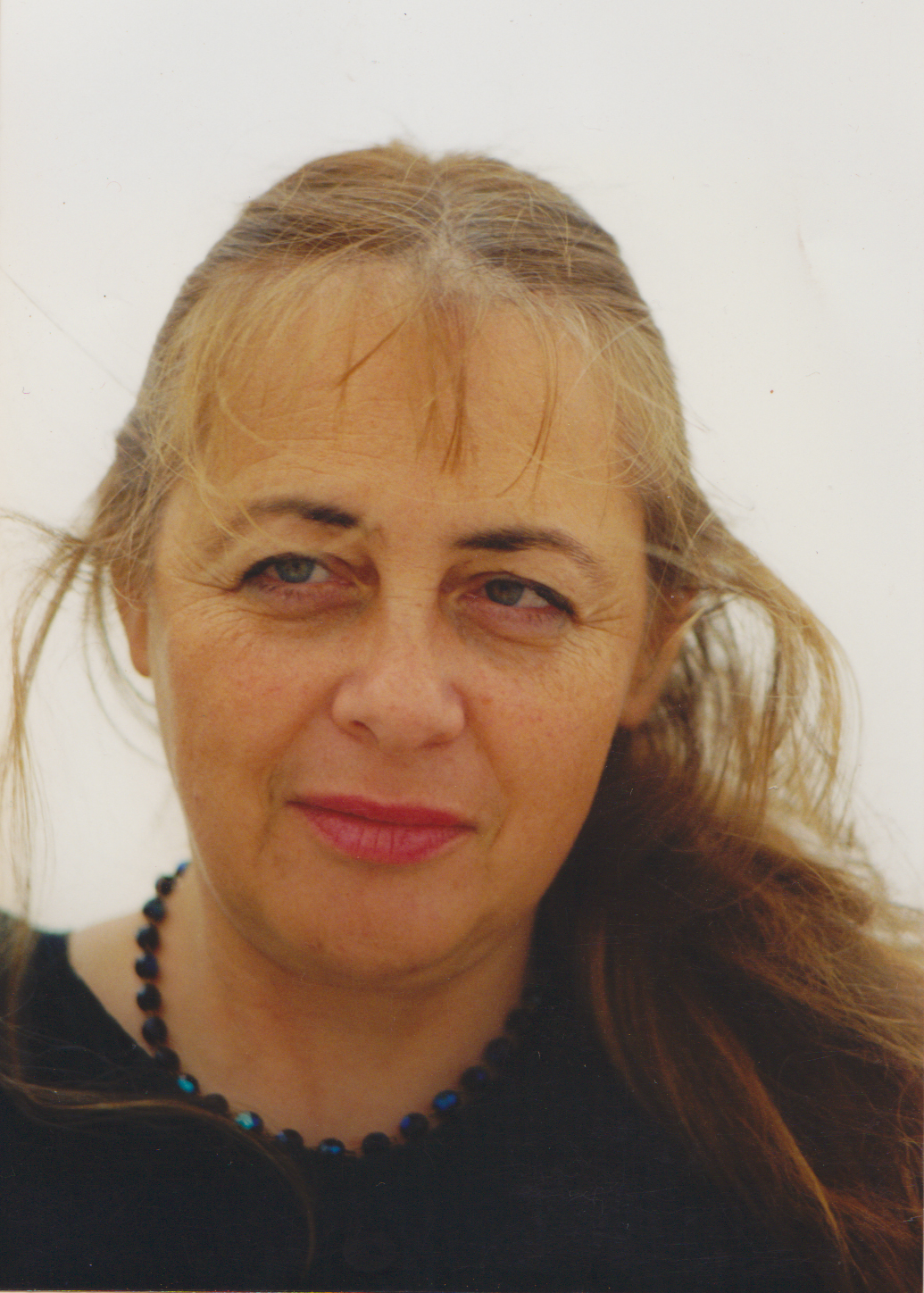
- Born: November 28, 1950 (age 75); Colombia
- Citizenship: Israeli
- Education: Ort Technicum, Giv'atayim, HaMidrasha College for the Arts, Ramat Hasharon,(today a part of Beit Berl)
- Occupation: interdisciplinary artist
- Years active: 1980–present
- Website: www.mirinishri.com

Miri Nishri (Hebrew: מירי נשרי) is an interdisciplinary Israeli artist.

== Biography ==
Miri Nishri was born in Colombia in 1950. She immigrated to Israel with her family when she was seven years old. She studied construction engineering at Ort Technicum, and art at Hamidrasha College for Arts (today a part of Beit Berl College).

== Artistic career ==
Nishri teaches art at the Tel Aviv Museum Workshops. She is the winner of the 1988 Oscar Handler Prize for artists and the 1996 Award of the Israeli Minister of Education & Culture.

Her works range between painting, photography, video art and installations, and were shown in exhibitions in galleries, museums and festivals around the world, including: Tel Aviv Museum of Art, Israel Museum, Haifa Museum of Art, Ramat Gan Museum of Israeli Art, "Luleå Summer Biennale" (Sweden), "Olympolis Project" (Greece), "Human Emotions Festival" (Rome, Italy), "Stuttgarter Filmwinter" (Germany) and Stenersen Museum (Oslo, Norway).

Her visual artworks are characterized by a strong sense of corporeality, and she tends to use coffee, among other materials, as paint. As she put it: "You could say that all my work is derived from the materials. I relate to physical materials no less than I do to literary materials, they are full of meanings and associations. For me, texture has always determined the subject.

Her video-arts and installations usually deal with the construction, deconstruction and reconstruction of a self identity, while bringing up questions about the nature of the artist and art. The collage nature of her art, endlessly moving from one subject, identity or genre to another, expresses her torn identity as a fatherless immigrant, daughter of a traumatized Holocaust survivor. In her videos documentary materials are often merged with stage materials, and the boundaries between reality and fiction are often blurred.

== Selected installations ==
- Blue Blue (1981) Nisri's first video art, constructed of two television sets running simultaneously, deals with the boundaries of the artistic medium within the screen. The work uses simply shaped elements, various repetitions and duplications, fake "malfunctions" of the video equipment as well as "quotations" from literature, philosophical theoriy and musical notes. Ha'ir's art critic Ronnie Sher wrote: "The video reminded me of Jean-Luc Godard's "Number Two" in structure and performance […] The common grounds between Godard and modern Avant-garde is the basic artistic concept: dealing weith the world through self-reflection, making a movie about making a movie. During the 1980s, this work was shown at the Tel Aviv Museum and Israel Museum, and twice at Haifa Museum almost twenty years later: in 2003 in the exhibition "Communication Interferences" which dealt with important art works by the first generation of video artists in Israel, and again in 2008 as part of the exhibition "Check Point" which summarized the 1980s in Israel's art world.
- Leopards (1981) a series of drawings in mixed techniques, using the wood's natural texture to simulate the leopards rosettes, while integrating sculptural elements, synthetic materials such as polyester, glass fibers and acrylics and natural materials like dirt, clay and bones. Nishri said: "I'm interested in forcing sculptural elements onto the painting surface in a way of contrast. The painting surface is decorative and lean in contrast with the heavy and rough sculptural elements.
- Is this Baby Yours? (2000) a two year mail correspondence project. Nishri sent out 300 boxes, with an embryo painted inside each, to intellectuals, artists and men and women of power. The boxes sent to both men and women also contained the question "will you recognize your paternity over this baby?" The 120 responses she received from people around the world (including Yoko Ono, Avi Mograbi, the Dalai Lama and the Pope) were shown at an exhibition at Ha'Kibbutz Israeli Art Gallery. In 2003 she published a book documenting the project and responses.
- Troubled Water (2006) a video installation documenting the crumbling consciousness of Gita, Nishri's mother. Gita, a Holocaust survivor in her last days, refuses to move to a home for the elderly, in fear that it is a mere euphemism for a Nazi death camp. Gita mixes her identity with that of the wife of a fireman killed on 9/11.The installation was shown at the Artist's House in Tel Aviv (2007), the Lulea Summer Biennale in Sweden (2007) and at the Stuttgarter Filmwinter in Germany (2010). The video art version has been shown in exhibitions and festivals around the world, including: Olympolis Festival (Greece), Human Emotions Festival (Italy) and Cologneoff Festival (Germany).

== Solo exhibitions ==
- 1984 Meet an Israeli Artist, Israel Museum, Jerusalem.
- 1987 Eyes, Kalisher Gallery, Tel-Aviv.
- 1988 Sarah Levy Gallery, Tel-Aviv.
- 1996 Breaking Waters, Janco Dada Museum, Ein-Hod.
- 2000 Is This Baby Yours?, Ha'Kibbutz Israeli Art Gallery, Tel-Aviv.
- 2001 Birthing Land, Oranim Institute.
- 2002 Sand in My Bed, Ramat Gan Museum of Israeli Art.
- 2006 Troubled Water, Tel-Aviv Artist's House.
- 2007 Troubled Water, Summer Biennale, Lulea, Sweden.
- 2010 Oceans of Lead, Tel-Aviv Artist's House.
- 2014 Down and Doubt, Zadik Gallery, Jaffa, Israel

== Artworks in The Israel Museum collection ==
- Fallen Angels, coffee on sketch paper, the Israel Museum's collection
- Water Dust, drawing, the Israel Museum's collection
- Ostrich, mixed technique, the Israel Museum's collection
- Water Dust, drawing, the Haifa Museum of Art's collection

== Gallery ==
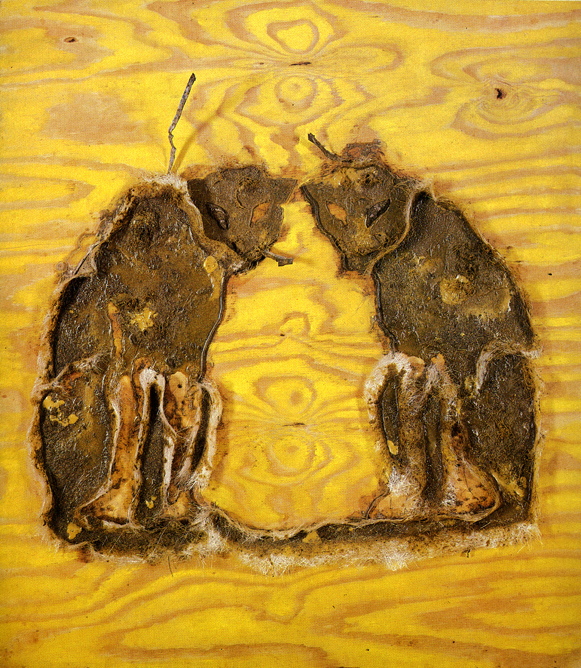
"Untitled", from the series "Leopards", 1981

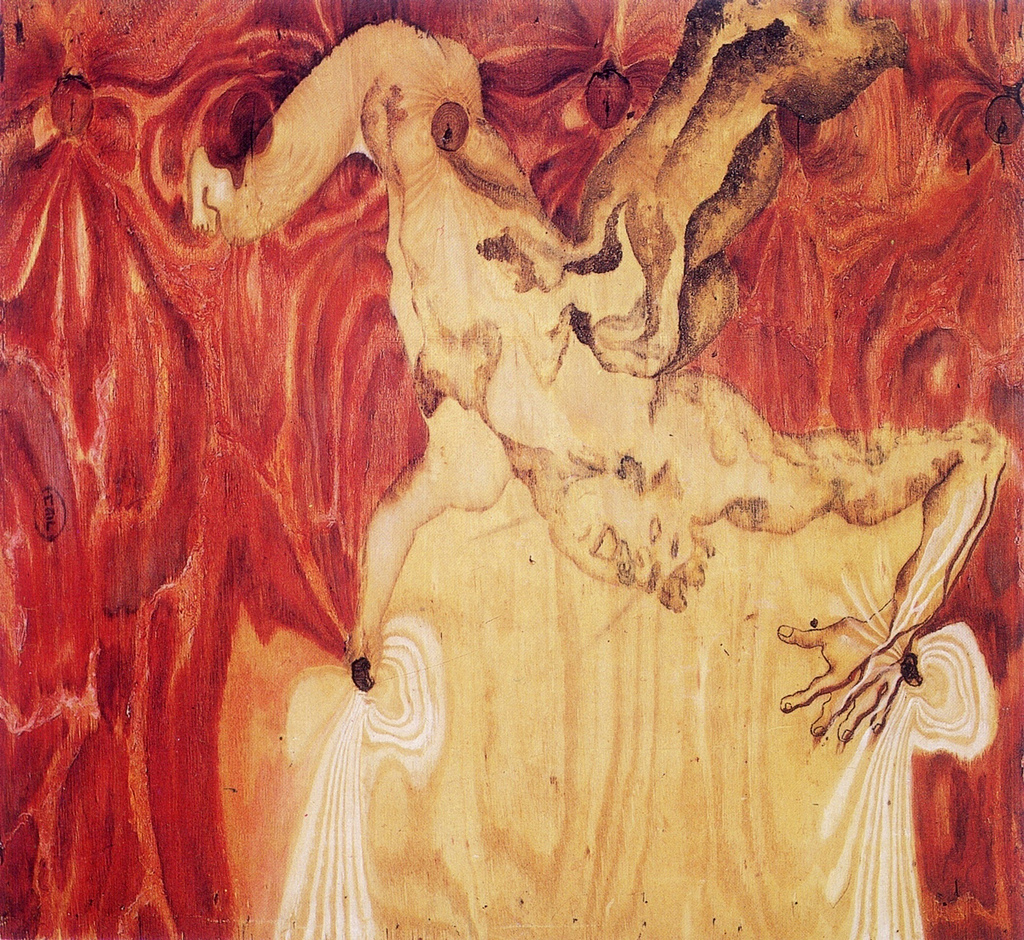
"Untitled", from the series "Fallen angels", 1988

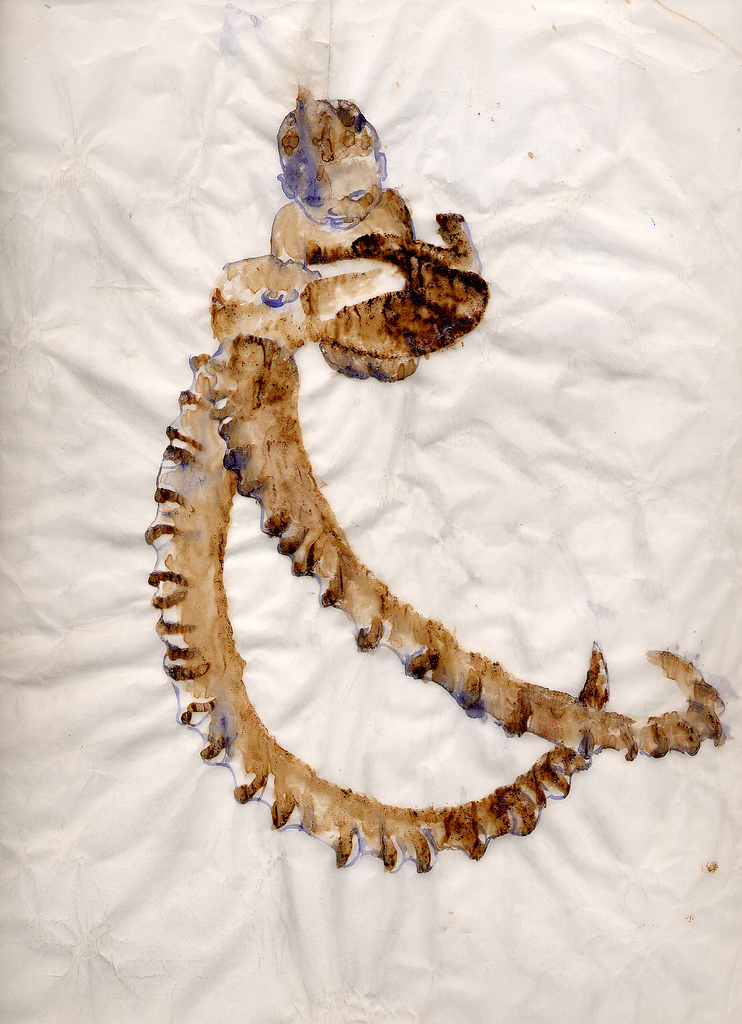
"Down and Doubt", 2003

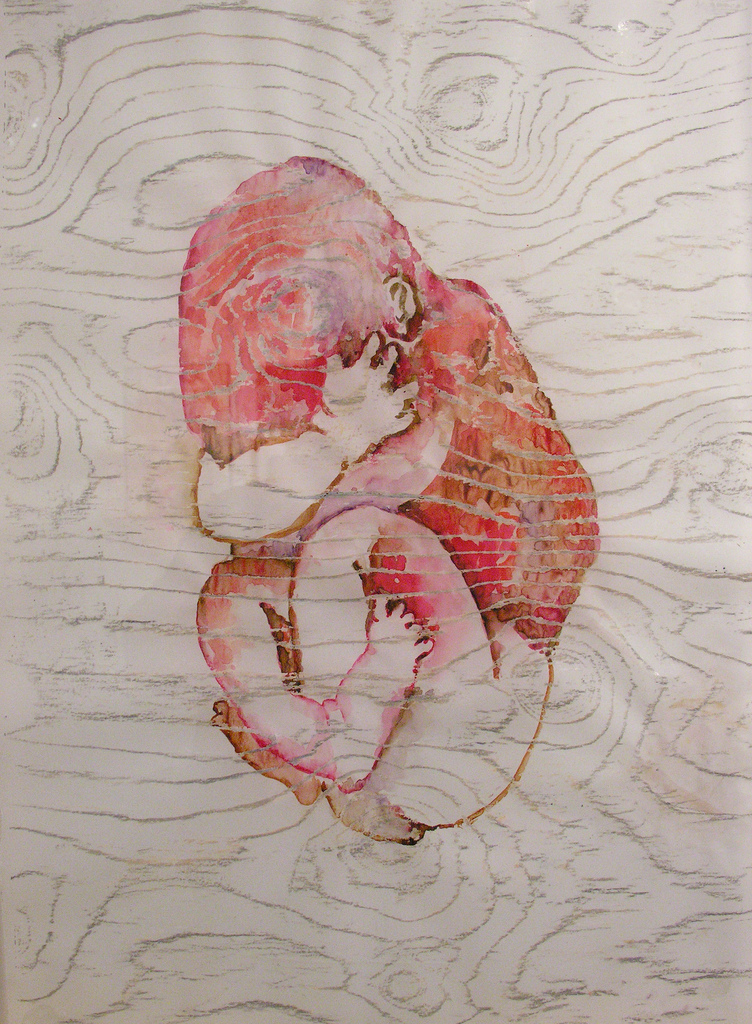
"Untitled", from the series "Nest", 2009

== See also ==
- Visual arts in Israel
