= Minsc and Boo's Journal of Villainy =

2021 Dungeons & Dragons sourcebook

- Cover of the original edition of Minsc and Boo's Journal of Villainy
- Author: James Ohlen
- Genre: Role-playing game
- Publisher: Wizards of the Coast
- Publication date: October 5, 2021
- Pages: 158

Minsc and Boo's Journal of Villainy is a 2021 sourcebook for the fifth edition of the Dungeons & Dragons fantasy role-playing game. Written and designed by James Ohlen, the lead designer of the first two Baldur's Gate video games, it was published by Wizards of the Coast through the Dungeon Masters Guild.

The book is framed as a journal compiled by the ranger Minsc and his hamster companion Boo. The supplement draws on characters and locations associated with the Baldur's Gate games and other Forgotten Realms works, presenting material for Dungeon Masters to construct campaigns around hometowns, patron organizations, villains, henchmen and monsters. Proceeds from its sale benefit the children's charity Extra Life.

The book was released without appearing in Wizards of the Coast's regular schedule of Dungeons & Dragons publications. It was the highest-selling Dungeon Masters Guild title released in 2021 according to sales data supplied by marketplace operator OneBookShelf.

== Development and publication ==
James Ohlen had previously worked at BioWare, where he was lead designer on Baldur's Gate and Baldur's Gate II: Shadows of Amn. After leaving the company, he co-founded the tabletop publisher Arcanum Worlds, whose releases included Heroes of Baldur's Gate, an adventure set between the two video games. He subsequently joined Wizards of the Coast to head Archetype Entertainment, a video game studio separate from the company's Dungeons & Dragons design team. Other former BioWare developers, Drew Karpyshyn, Brent Knowles and Jesse Sky, were among its credited contributors. The book also reused some artwork and monsters from Heroes of Baldur's Gate.

Wizards of the Coast released Minsc and Boo's Journal of Villainy through the Dungeon Masters Guild on October 5, 2021, without a prior announcement in its normal publication schedule. It was made available as a PDF and in softcover and hardcover print-on-demand editions, with all proceeds directed to Extra Life. Geek Native reported that the title briefly disappeared from the marketplace several days after its release before becoming available again.

== Contents and design ==
Minsc and Boo's Journal of Villainy is presented with handwritten annotations attributed to Minsc alongside the conventional sourcebook material. The supplement is structured around what it calls a "Heroic Journey", a framework for building a campaign around a starting location, a group that unites the player characters, a principal antagonist and subordinate enemies. Its five chapters respectively cover hometowns, group patrons, campaign villains, henchmen and monsters. The hometown material describes Athkatla, Baldur's Gate, Suldanessellar and the drow city of Ust Natha, while ten organizations are presented as possible patrons for an adventuring party. Six major villains and a collection of henchmen and monsters provide higher-level opposition.

Much of the material draws from the earlier BioWare games. Besides Minsc and Boo, characters from the Baldur's Gate and Neverwinter Nights series appear in new roles, while several creatures from earlier editions of Dungeons & Dragons were given fifth-edition statistics.

== Reception ==
Jody Macgregor of PC Gamer considered the book's greater level of mechanical and setting detail useful, particularly its magic-item rules, complete spell lists and statistics for high-level enemies. He contrasted the book with contemporary Dungeons & Dragons supplements that left setting details comparatively open-ended. He highlighted its fixed prices and rules for acquiring magic items, complete spell lists for monsters and statistics for powerful antagonists such as Bhaal and Mephistopheles. He also noted that some of the updated biographies departed unexpectedly from the characters' video game portrayals, singling out the changes made to Imoen, a companion character from the Baldur's Gate series. Nevertheless, he regarded the characterizations as closer to the games than those in the Baldur's Gate novelizations.

Ed Fortune of Starburst regarded the book as particularly worthwhile for players interested in the original Baldur's Gate games or the Forgotten Realms. He praised the hometown material and its rules for obtaining magic items, while describing the patron organizations as less consistent in quality. Fortune considered the major villains better suited to planning full campaigns than individual adventures and thought the henchmen had enough characterization and plot material to function as more than disposable opponents. He concluded that the sourcebook was a useful addition to a Dungeon Master's collection and recommended the hardcover edition.

The supplement also performed strongly on digital tabletop marketplaces. In sales data supplied by OneBookShelf to Geek Native, Minsc and Boo's Journal of Villainy was the highest-selling Dungeon Masters Guild product among titles released during 2021. In a separate ranking of fantasy role-playing products published that year and sold through DriveThruRPG, it placed second behind Worlds Without Number.
