= List of role-playing video games: 2000 to 2001 =

This is a comprehensive index of commercial role-playing video games (RPGs), sorted chronologically by year. Information regarding release platform, release type, RPG subgenre, game setting, developers, publishers, and country of origin is provided where available. The table can be sorted by clicking on the small boxes next to the column headings.

This list includes all RPG subgenres, including MMORPGs, Action RPGs and Tactical RPGs. This list does not include MUDs and Roguelikes by default, unless they have an additional RPG subgenre. For standalone lists on these subgenres, see List of MUDs and List of roguelikes

== Legend ==
Video game platforms
DC	Dreamcast	DOS	PC DOS / MS-DOS, Windows 3.X	GBA	Game Boy Advance, iQue GBA
GBC	Game Boy Color	GCN	GameCube	LIN	Linux, SteamOS
MAC	Classic Mac OS, 2001 and before	MSX2	MSX2	N64	Nintendo 64, iQue Player
NEO	Neo Geo AES	PS1	PlayStation 1	PS2	PlayStation 2
PSP	PlayStation Portable	WIN	Windows, all versions Windows 95 and up	WS	WonderSwan
WSC	WonderSwan Color	XBOX	(replace with XB)		

Types of releases
Compilation	A compilation, anthology or collection of several titles, usually (but not always) belonging to the same series
Early access	A game launched in early access is unfinished and thus might contain bugs and glitches or have some of the content missing
Episodic	An episodic video game that is released in batches over a period of time
Expansion	A large-scale DLC to an already existing game that adds new story, areas and additions and/or changes to the game's mechanics
Full release	A full release of a game that launched in early access first
Limited	A special release (often called "Limited" or "Collector's Edition") with bonus collector's material. Often provided to people who pre-order a game
Port	The game first appeared on a different platform and a port was made. The game is like the original, with few or no differences
Remake	The game is an enhanced remake of an original, made using a new engine and/or assets and thus containing completely new sound, graphics and possibly changes to the story and/or gameplay
Remaster	The game is a remaster of an original, released on the same or different platform, with (usually minor) changes to graphics, sound and/or gameplay
Rerelease	The game was re-released on the same platform with no or only minor changes

Video game genres
Action RPG	Action role-playing game	Dungeon crawl	Dungeon crawl	JRPG	Japanese-style role-playing game
MMORPG	Massively multiplayer online RPG	Monster tamer	Monster-taming game	MUD	Multi-user dungeon
Real-time	Real-time game	Roguelike	Roguelike, Roguelite	Sandbox	Sandbox game
Soulslike	Soulslike	Tactical RPG	Tactical role-playing game	Turn-based	Turn-based game

== List ==
Year	Title	Developer	Publisher	Setting	Platform	Subgenre	Series/Notes	COO
2000 (JP)	7: The Cavalry of Molmorth	Namco	Namco	Fantasy	PS2	Tactical RPG; Real-time		JP
2000 (JP)	Anima Star			Fantasy	DC			JP
2000 (JP/NA); 2001 (PAL)	Breath of Fire IV	Capcom	Capcom	Fantasy	PS1	JRPG	Breath of Fire	JP
2000 (JP)	Castle Fantasia 2: Seima Taisen	Studio E-Go!	Studio E-Go!	Fantasy	DC (Port)	Tactical RPG	Castle Fantasia	JP
2000 (JP)	Chō Aniki: Otoko no Tamafuda	Masaya	Bandai	Modern	WS	Card-based	Cho Aniki	JP
2000 (NA)	Crystalis	Nintendo	Nintendo	Fantasy	GBC (Remake)	Action RPG	Crystalis	JP
2000 (NA)	Custom Robo V2	Noise	Nintendo	Robotics	N64	Action RPG	Custom Robo	JP
2000 (JP); 2001 (NA/EU)	Dark Cloud	Level-5	SCE	Fantasy	PS2	Action RPG; City-building	Dark Cloud	JP
2000 (JP)	deSPIRIA	Atlus	Atlus	Fantasy	DC	Action RPG		JP
2000 (JP); 2001 (NA)	Digimon World 2	Bandai	Bandai	Sci-Fi; Fantasy	PS1	Monster raising	Digimon	JP
2000 (JP); 2001 (NA)	Dragon Warrior III; Dragon Quest III	Chunsoft	Enix	Fantasy	GBC (Remake)	JRPG	Dragon Quest	JP
2000 (JP); 2001 (NA)	Dragon Warrior VII; Dragon Quest VII	Heartbeat; ArtePiazza	Enix	Fantasy	PS1	JRPG	Dragon Quest	JP
2000 (JP)	Eldorado Gate, Vol 1	Capcom	Capcom	Fantasy	DC	JRPG	Eldorado Gate	JP
2000 (JP)	Eldorado Gate, Vol 2	Capcom	Capcom	Fantasy	DC	JRPG	Eldorado Gate	JP
2000 (JP); 2001 (NA/EU)	Ephemeral Fantasia	Konami	Konami	Fantasy	PS2	JRPG		JP
2000 (JP); 2001 (NA)	Eternal Eyes		Sunsoft	Fantasy	PS1			JP
2000 (JP/NA/EU)	Eternal Ring	From	Agetec	Fantasy	PS2	Action RPG		JP
2000 (JP/NA); 2001 (PAL)	Evergrace	From	Agetec	Fantasy	PS2	Action RPG		JP
2000 (JP)	Final Fantasy	Square	Square	Fantasy	WSC (Port)	JRPG	Final Fantasy	JP
2000 (JP/NA); 2001 (EU/AU)	Final Fantasy IX	Square	Square; Infogrames	Fantasy	PS1	JRPG	Final Fantasy	JP
2000 (JP)	Fushigi no Dungeon: Fūrai no Siren 2: Oni Shūrai! Siren-jō!	Chunsoft	Chunsoft	Fantasy	N64	Roguelike	Mystery Dungeon: Shiren the Wanderer	JP
2000 (JP)	Gaia Master			Fantasy	DC			JP
2000 (JP/NA); 2001 (EU)	Grandia II	Game Arts	Sega; Enix; Ubisoft	Fantasy	DC	JRPG	Grandia	JP
2000 (JP)	Grandia: Parallel Trippers	Game Arts	Hudson Soft	Fantasy	GBC	JRPG	Grandia	JP
2000 (JP)	Karkurenbo Battle Monster Tactics	Spiral	Nintendo	Fantasy	GBC	Tactical RPG		JP
2000 (JP)	Kikou Seiki Unitron	Yumekobo	SNK Playmore	Robotics	NEO	Turn-based, dungeon crawl	Sequel to Biomotor Unitron	JP
2000 (JP)	L.O.L.: Lack of Love	Love-de-Lic	ASCII Entertainment	Fantasy	DC	Adventure/Life simulation		JP
2000 (JP)	Langrisser Millennium: The Last Century ラングリッサーミレニアムWS THE LAST CENTURY	Masaya	NCS	Fantasy	WS (Port)	Tactical RPG	Langrisser	JP
2000 (JP)	Medarot 3: Kabuto Version	Natsume Co., Ltd.	Imagineer	Science Fiction	GBC	Action RPG	Medabots	JP
2000 (JP)	Medarot 3: Kuwagata Version	Natsume Co., Ltd.	Imagineer	Science Fiction	GBC	Action RPG	Medabots	JP
2000 (JP)	Ore no Shikabane o Koete Yuke 俺の屍を越えてゆけ	Alfa System; MARS; Contrail	SCE	Fantasy	PS1 (Rerel)			JP
2000 (JP/NA)	Orphen: Scion of Sorcery	Shade	Activision	Fantasy	PS2	Action RPG	Adaptation of Sorcerous Stabber Orphen	JP
2000 (JP); 2001 (NA/PAL)	Paper Mario	Intelligent	Nintendo	Fantasy	N64	Action RPG	Mario Brothers; Paper Mario	JP
2000 (JP/NA)	Persona 2: Eternal Punishment	Atlus	Atlus	Fantasy	PS1	JRPG	Megami Tensei: Persona; Persona 2	JP
2000 (JP); 2001 (NA/EU)	Phantasy Star Online	Sonic Team	Sega	Fantasy	DC, GCN, WIN, XBOX	Action RPG	Phantasy Star	JP
2000 (JP); 2001 (NA/EU)	Pokémon Crystal	Game Freak	Nintendo	Fantasy	GBC (Remake)	Monster raising	Pokémon	JP
2000 (JP)	Popolocrois Monogatari II	SCE	SCE	Fantasy	PS1	Tactical RPG	PoPoLoCrois	JP
2000 (EU)	Realms of Adventure	Umax	Sunrise		MSX2			NL
2000 (JP); 2001 (NA)	Record of Lodoss War: Advent of Cardice	Neverland	ESP; Conspiracy; Crave; Swing!	Fantasy	DC	Action RPG	Based on Record of Lodoss War	JP
2000 (JP)	Rune Jade			Fantasy	DC			JP
2000 (JP)	Sakura Taisen	Sega	Sega; Red Ent.	Steampunk	DC (Port)	Tactical RPG	Sakura Wars	JP
2000 (JP)	Sakura Taisen 2: Kimi, Shinitamou koto Nakare	Sega	Sega; Red Ent.	Steampunk	DC (Port)	Tactical RPG	Sakura Wars	JP
2000 (JP)	SD Gundam G Generation-F; SDガンダム ジージェネレーション・エフ	Bandai	Bandai	Sci-Fi	PS1	Tactical RPG	Based on Super Deformed Gundam	JP
2000 (JP)	SD Gundam G Generation: Gather Beat; SDガンダム Gジェネレーション ギャザービート	Bandai	Bandai	Sci-Fi	WS	Tactical RPG	Based on Super Deformed Gundam	JP
2000 (JP)	Seireiki Rayblade 聖霊機ライブレード	Winkysoft	Winkysoft	Sci-Fi	DC, PS1	Tactical RPG		JP
2000 (WW)	Siege of Avalon	Digital Tome	Take 2 Globalstar; Blackstar	Fantasy	WIN	Action RPG		US
2000 (NA)	Silver	Spiral House	Infogrames	Fantasy	DC (Port)	WRPG	Silver	NA/FR
2000 (JP/NA); 2001 (EU)	Skies of Arcadia	Overworks	Sega	Fantasy	DC	JRPG	Skies of Arcadia	JP
2000 (JP)	Sorcerian: Apprentice of Seven Star Magic	Victor		Fantasy	DC (Remake)	Action RPG	Dragon Slayer: Sorcerian	JP
2000 (JP)	Summon Night	Flight-Plan	Banpresto	Steampunk	PS1	Tactical RPG	Summon Night	JP
2000 (NA); 2001 (EU)	Summoner	Volition	THQ	Fantasy	PS2	Action RPG	Summoner	NA
2000 (JP)	Sunrise Eiyuutan R サンライズ英雄譚R	Sunrise		Fantasy	PS2		Sunrise Eiyuutan	JP
2000 (JP)	Super Hero Sakusen: Diedal's Ambition	Banpresto	Banpresto	Sci-Fi	PS1	JRPG	Super Hero Sakusen	JP
2000 (JP)	Super Robot Wars Alpha	Banpresto	Banpresto	Sci-Fi	PS1	Tactical RPG	Super Robot Wars	JP
2000 (JP)	Super Robot Wars Compact 2	Banpresto	Banpresto	Sci-Fi	WS	Tactical RPG	Super Robot Wars	JP
2000 (JP); 2001 (NA)	Tales of Eternia	Telenet Japan; Wolf Team	Namco; Ubisoft	Fantasy	PS1	Action RPG	Tales	JP
2000 (JP)	Tales of Phantasia: Narikiri Dungeon	Wolf Team	Namco	Fantasy	GBC	JRPG	Tales	JP
2000 (??)	Time Stalkers	Climax	Sega	Fantasy	DC	JRPG/Monster raising	Spin-off of Landstalker: The Treasures of King Nole	JP
2000 (JP)	Tricolore Crise	Victor	Victor	Fantasy	DC			JP
2000 (JP/NA/EU)	Vagrant Story	Square	Square	Fantasy	PS1	JRPG	Set in Ivalice	JP
2000 (NA); 2001 (EU)	Warriors of Might and Magic	The 3DO Company	The 3DO Company	Fantasy	WIN	Action RPG	Might and Magic	US
2000 (TW)	Xuan-Yuan Sword 3: The Scar of the Sky	DOMO Studio	Softstar Entertainment	Fantasy	WIN	Action RPG	Xuan-Yuan Sword	TW
2001 (JP)	Abarenbou Princess 暴れん坊プリンセス	Alfa System	Kadokawa Shoten; ESP	Fantasy	PS2			JP
2001 (NA/EU)	Aidyn Chronicles: The First Mage	H2O	THQ	Fantasy	N64			NA
2001 (JP)	Alchemist Marie & Elie	Gust		Fantasy	WSC (Remake or port)	JRPG	Atelier; compilation of Marie and Elie	JP
2001 (JP)	Atelier Lilie: The Alchemist of Salburg 3	Gust	JRPG	Fantasy	PS2		Atelier	JP
2001 (NA/EU); 2002 (JP)	Baldur's Gate: Dark Alliance	Snowblind	Vivendi	Fantasy	PS2	Action RPG	Baldur's Gate; Dungeons & Dragons franchise	NA
2001 (NA)	Battle Hunter	Success	A1 Games	Sci-Fi	PS1	Tactical RPG; Card battle		JP
2001 (JP)	Blue Wing Blitz	Square	Square	Modern; Fantasy	WSC	Tactical RPG		JP
2001 (JP/NA/EU)	Breath of Fire	Capcom	Capcom	Fantasy	GBA (Port)	JRPG	Breath of Fire	JP
2001 (JP); 2002 (NA/EU)	Breath of Fire II			Fantasy	GBA (Port)	JRPG	Breath of Fire	JP
2001 (JP)	Castle Fantasia 2: Seima Taisen	Studio E-Go!	Studio E-Go!	Fantasy	DC (Port)	Tactical RPG; Eroge	Castle Fantasia	JP
2001 (JP)	D+Vine Luv	Princess	Princess	Fantasy	DC			JP
2001 (NA/PAL)	Darkstone	Delphine	Take-Two; EA	Fantasy	PS1 (Port)	Action RPG (Diablo style)		FR
2001 (JP/NA); 2002 (EU)	Dokapon: Monster Hunter	Asmik	Asmik; AIA; Ubisoft	Fantasy	GBA	Monster raising		JP
2001 (JP)	Dragon Quest IV	Heartbeat; ArtePiazza	Square Enix	Fantasy	PS1 (Remake)	JRPG	Dragon Quest	JP
2001 (JP/NA)	Dragon Warrior Monsters 2: Cobi's Journey	TOSE	Enix	Fantasy	GBC	Monster raising	Dragon Quest Monsters, Dragon Quest	JP
2001 (JP/NA)	Dragon Warrior Monsters 2: Tara's Adventure	TOSE	Enix	Fantasy	GBC	Monster raising	Dragon Quest Monsters, Dragon Quest	JP
2001 (NA); 2002 (PAL)	Dragon Riders: Chronicles of Pern	Ubi	Ubisoft	Fantasy	DC	Adventure/RPG hybrid	Adaptation of Dragonriders of Pern	UK
2001 (JP)	Eithéa アイシア	TamTam	Atlus	Fantasy	PS1	Tactical RPG		JP
2001 (JP)	El Dorado Gate vol 3, vol 4, vol 5, vol 6 & vol 7	Capcom	Capcom	Fantasy	DC	JRPG	El Dorado Gate	JP
2001 (JP)	Enterbrain Collection: Simulation RPG Tsukūru	Enterbrain	ASCII	N/A	PS1	Tactical RPG	RPG Maker	JP
2001 (JP)	Exodus Guilty Neos	Abel	Abel	Fantasy	DC			JP
2001 (JP)	Final Fantasy II	Square	Square	Fantasy	WSC (Remake)	JRPG	Final Fantasy	JP
2001 (NA)	Final Fantasy Chronicles	TOSE	Square EA	Fantasy	PS1 (Remake)	JRPG	Compilation of Final Fantasy IV and Chrono Trigger	JP
2001 (JP)	Genso Suikogaiden Volume 2: Duel at the Crystal Valley	Konami	Konami	Fantasy	PS1		Suikoden	JP
2001 (JP)	Global Folktale	Idea Factory	Idea Factory	Fantasy	PS2	Tactical RPG; Real-time		JP
2001 (JP/NA); 2002 (EU)	Golden Sun 黄金の太陽	Camelot	Nintendo	Fantasy	GBA	JRPG	Golden Sun	JP
2001 (JP)	Growlanser II: The Sense of Justice グローランサーII	CareerSoft	Atlus	Fantasy	PS2	Tactical RPG	Growlanser	JP
2001 (JP)	Growlanser III: The Dual Darkness グローランサーIII	CareerSoft	Atlus	Fantasy	PS2	Tactical RPG	Growlanser	JP
2001 (JP/NA)	Hoshigami: Ruining Blue Earth	MaxFive	Atlus	Fantasy	PS1	Tactical RPG		JP
2001 (JP)	Innocent Tears	Global A		Modern; Fantasy	DC	Tactical RPG		JP
2001 (JP/NA); 2002 (EU)	Jade Cocoon 2	Genki	Genki; Ubisoft	Fantasy	PS2	Monster raising	Jade Cocoon	JP
2001 (JP); 2002 (NA)	King's Field IV; King's Field: The Ancient City in NA	From	Agetec	Fantasy	PS2	Action RPG	King's Field	JP
2001 (JP); 2002 (NA/EU)	Legaia 2: Duel Saga	Prokion	SCEI; Eidos	Fantasy	PS2	JRPG	Legend of Legaia	JP
2001 (JP/NA/EU)	Lufia: The Legend Returns; Estpolis Denki: Yomigaeru Densetsu エストポリス伝記 よみがえる伝説	Neverland	Taito; Natsume Inc. Ubisoft	Fantasy	GBC	JRPG	Lufia	JP
2001 (JP); 2002 (NA)	Lunar Legend	Japan Art Media	Ubisoft	Fantasy	GBA (Remake)	JRPG	Lunar	JP
2001 (NA); 2002 (JP)	Magi Nation	Interactive Imagination	Epoch	Fantasy	GBC	Monster raising	Based on Magi-Nation Duel	JP
2001 (CA)	Mango Plumo	Quebec Amerique	QA International	Edutainment	WIN, MAC			CA
2001 (JP)	Medarot Navi	Natsume Co., Ltd.	Imagineer	Robotics	GBA	Action RPG	Medabots	JP
2001 (JP/NA/EU)	Mega Man Battle Network	Capcom	Capcom	Sci-Fi	GBA	Action RPG	Mega Man Battle Network	JP
2001 (JP); 2002 (NA/PAL)	Mega Man Battle Network 2	Capcom	Capcom	Sci-Fi	GBA	Action RPG	Mega Man Battle Network	JP
2001 (JP)	Metal Walker			Sci-Fi	GBC	Monster raising		JP
2001 (TW)	New Legend of Sword and Fairy	Softstar	Softstar	Fantasy	WIN	Turn-based	Remake of The Legend of Sword and Fairy (video game) for DOS	TW
2001 (JP)	Nishikaze no Kyoushikyouku	Softmax	Softmax	Fantasy	DC			JP
2001 (JP/NA)	Okage: Shadow King	Zener Works	SCE	Fantasy	PS2			JP
2001 (JP)	Oni Zero: Fukkatsu; ONI零 〜復活〜	Pandora Box	Pandora Box	Fantasy	PS1			JP
2000 (JP/EU); 2001 (NA)	Record of Lodoss War: Advent of Cardice	Neverland	ESP; Conspiracy; Crave; Swing!	Fantasy	DC	Action-RPG	Based on Record of Lodoss War	JP
2001 (JP)	Romancing SaGa	Square	Square	Fantasy	WSC (Port)	JRPG	SaGa	JP
2001 (JP)	Sakura Taisen 3: Pari wa Moeteiru ka	Red; Overworks	Sega	Steampunk	DC	Tactical RPG	Sakura Wars	JP
2001 (JP)	SD Gundam G Generation-F.I.F; SDガンダム ジージェネレーション エフイフ	Bandai	Bandai	Sci-Fi	PS1	Tactical RPG	Based on Super Deformed Gundam.	JP
2001 (JP)	SD Gundam G Generation: Gather Beat 2 SDガンダム Gジェネレーション ギャザビート2	Bandai	Bandai	Sci-Fi	WS	Tactical RPG	Based on Super Deformed Gundam.	JP
2001 (JP)	Segagaga セガガガ	Sega	Sega	Parody	DC	JRPG		JP
2001 (JP/NA); 2002 (PAL)	Shadow Hearts シャドウハーツ	Sacnoth	Aruze; Midway	Fantasy	PS2	JRPG	Shadow Hearts	JP
2001 (JP)	Star Ocean: Blue Sphere	tri-Ace	Enix	Sci-Fi	GBC	JRPG	Star Ocean	JP
2001 (??)	Summon Night 2	Flight-Plan	Banpresto	Steampunk	GBC	Tactical RPG	Summon Night	JP
2001 (JP)	Super Robot Wars Advance	Banpresto	Banpresto	Sci-Fi	GBA	Tactical RPG	Super Robot Wars	JP
2001 (JP)	Super Robot Wars Alpha Gaiden	Banpresto	Banpresto	Sci-Fi	PS1	Tactical RPG	Super Robot Wars	JP
2001 (JP)	Super Tokusatsu Taisen 2001	Japan Art Media	Banpresto	Sci-Fi	PS1	Tactical RPG		JP
2001 (JP); 2002 (NA)	Tactics Ogre: The Knight of Lodis	Quest	Atlus	Fantasy	GBA	Tactical RPG	Ogre Battle	JP
2001 (JP)	Tear Ring Saga: Yutona Eiyū Senki ティアリングサーガ ユトナ英雄戦記	Tirnanog	Enterbrain	Sc-Fi	PS1	Tactical RPG	Tear Ring Saga	JP
2001 (JP)	Tsugunai: Atonement	Cattle Call	Atlus	Fantasy	PS2			JP
2001 (JP)	Volfoss	Namco	Namco	Fantasy; Surreal	PS1	Tactical RPG		JP
2001 (JP/NA); 2002 (EU)	Wizardry: Tale of the Forsaken Land	Racjin	Atlus, Ubisoft	Fantasy	PS2	WRPG	Wizardry	JP
2001 (JP); 2002 (NA/PAL)	Zone of the Enders: The Fist of Mars	Konami; Sunrise	Konami	Fantasy	GBA	Tactical RPG		JP
2000 (NA)	Avernum	Spiderweb	Spiderweb	Fantasy	MAC, WIN	Tactical RPG	Avernum	NA
2000 (NA)	Avernum 2	Spiderweb	Spiderweb	Fantasy	MAC, WIN	Tactical RPG	Avernum	NA
2000 (NA)	Baldur's Gate	Graphsim	Graphsim	Fantasy	MAC (Port)	WRPG	Baldur's Gate; Infinity Engine; Dungeons & Dragons franchise	NA
2000 (NA)	Baldur's Gate II: Shadows of Amn	BioWare; Black Isle	Interplay	Fantasy	WIN	WRPG	Baldur's Gate; Infinity Engine; Dungeons & Dragons franchise	NA
2000 (NA)	Baldur's Gate II: Shadows of Amn – Collector's Edition	BioWare; Black Isle	Interplay	Fantasy	WIN (Limit)	WRPG	Baldur's Gate; Infinity Engine; Dungeons & Dragons franchise	NA
2000 (NA)	Baldur's Gate Double Pack	BioWare	Interplay	Fantasy	WIN (Comp)	WRPG	Baldur's Gate; Infinity Engine; Dungeons & Dragons franchise	NA
2000 (NA)	Baldur's Gate: The Original Saga	BioWare	Interplay	Fantasy	WIN (Comp)	WRPG	Baldur's Gate; Infinity Engine; Dungeons & Dragons franchise	NA
2000 (NA)	Blizzard Anthology	Blizzard	Blizzard	Fantasy	WIN (Comp)	Action RPG; Roguelike	Compilation of Diablo, StarCraft and WarCraft II	NA
2000 (NA)	Card of Destiny	Digianime	Digianime	Fantasy			Cards of Destiny	JP
2000 (JP)	Castle Fantasia 2: Seima Taisen	Studio E-Go!	Studio E-Go!	Fantasy	WIN	Tactical RPG; Eroge	Castle Fantasia	JP
2000 (NA); 2003 (UK)	Deus Ex	Ion Storm	Eidos	Sci-Fi	WIN	FPS/RPG	Deus Ex	NA
2000 (NA)	Deus Ex	Ion Storm	Aspyr	Sci-Fi	MAC (Port)	FPS/RPG	Deus Ex	NA
2000 (NA)	Diablo Gift Pack	Blizzard	Blizzard	Fantasy	WIN (Comp)	Action RPG; Roguelike	Diablo; Comp. of I and II	NA
2000 (NA); 2003 (EU)	Diablo II	Blizzard; Blizzard North	Blizzard	Fantasy	MAC, WIN	Action RPG; Roguelike	Diablo	NA
2000 (NA/UK)	Diablo II: Exclusive Gift Set	Blizzard	Blizzard	Fantasy	WIN (Limit)	Action RPG; Roguelike	Diablo	NA
2000 (NA)	Diablo II: Collector's Edition	Blizzard	Blizzard	Fantasy	MAC (Limit), WIN (Limit)	Action RPG; Roguelike	Diablo	NA
2000 (NA)	Final Fantasy VIII	Square	Eidos	Sci-Fi; Fantasy	WIN (Port)	JRPG	Final Fantasy	JP
2001 (NA)	Final Fantasy X	Square	Square	Fantasy	PS2	JRPG	Final Fantasy	JP
2000 (NA)	Icewind Dale	Black Isle	Interplay	Fantasy	WIN	WRPG	Icewind Dale; Infinity Engine; Dungeons & Dragons franchise	NA
2000 (INT)	Jagged Alliance 2	Sir-Tech	Titan	Modern	LIN (Port)	Tactical RPG	Jagged Alliance	NA
2000 (NA)	Jagged Alliance 2: Unfinished Business	Sir-Tech	Interplay	Modern	WIN	Tactical RPG	Jagged Alliance	NA
2000 (JP)	Legend of Heroes IV, The: A Tear of Vermillion; The Legend of Heroes: A Tear of Vermillion 英雄伝説IV「朱紅い雫」	Nihon Falcom	Nihon Falcom	Fantasy	WIN (Port)		Dragon Slayer: The Legend of Heroes	JP
1999 (RU); 2000 (EU/NA)	Legend of the North: Konung; Konung: Legends of the North	1C	Strategy First	Fantasy	WIN	RTS/RPG hybrid		RU
2000 (NA/EU)	Might and Magic VIII: Day of the Destroyer	New World	3DO; Buka	Fantasy	WIN	WRPG	Might and Magic	NA
2000 (NA)	Nox	Westwood	EA	Fantasy	WIN	Action RPG		NA
2000 (??)	RPG Maker 2000	Enterbrain	ASCII	N/A	WIN	RPG construction tool	RPG Maker	JP
2000 (JP)	Sakura Taisen	Red; Overworks	Sega	Steampunk	WIN (Port)	Tactical RPG	Sakura Wars	JP
2000 (JP)	Sorcerian Original	Nihon Falcom	Nihon Falcom	Fantasy	WIN (Remake)	Action RPG	Dragon Slayer: Sorcerian	JP
2000 (NA)	System Shock 2	Irrational; Looking Glass	EA	Sci-Fi	WIN (Rerel)	FPS/RPG	System Shock	NA
2000 (NA)	Ultima World Edition	Origin	EA	Fantasy	WIN (Comp)	WRPG	Ultima: Compilation of IX and UO	NA
2000 (NA)	Vampire: The Masquerade - Redemption	Nihilistic	Activision	Historical; Modern; Fantasy	WIN	WRPG	Based on White Wolf's World of Darkness	NA
2000 (NA)	Wizards & Warriors	Heuristic Park	Activision	Fantasy	WIN	WRPG		NA
2001 (NA/AU)	Anachronox	Ion Storm	Eidos; Infogrames	Cyberpunk	WIN	JRPG		NA
2001 (NA/UK)	Arcanum: Of Steamworks and Magick Obscura	Troika	Sierra	Steampunk	WIN	WRPG		NA
2001 (NA/EU)	Art of Magic: Magic & Mayhem, The	Climax; Charybdis	Virgin; Bethesda	Fantasy	WIN	Tactical RPG; Real-time	Magic & Mayhem	NA
2001 (NA)	Baldur's Gate: Tales of the Sword Coast	BioWare	Graphic Simulations	Fantasy	MAC (Port)	WRPG	Baldur's Gate; Infinity Engine; Dungeons & Dragons franchise	NA
2001 (NA/EU)	Baldur's Gate II: Shadows of Amn	BioWare; Black Isle	MacPlay	Fantasy	MAC (Port)	WRPG	Baldur's Gate; Infinity Engine; Dungeons & Dragons franchise	NA
2001 (NA)	Baldur's Gate II: Throne of Bhaal	BioWare	Black Isle	Fantasy	WIN	WRPG	Baldur's Gate; Infinity Engine; Dungeons & Dragons franchise	NA
2001 (UK); 2002 (AU)	Diablo	Blizzard North	Blizzard	Fantasy	WIN (Rerel)	Action RPG; Roguelike	Diablo	NA
2001 (NA)	Diablo: Battle Chest	Blizzard	Blizzard	Fantasy	MAC (Comp), WIN (Comp)	Action RPG; Roguelike	Diablo; Compilation of I, II and IILOD	NA
2001 (NA); 2003 (EU)	Diablo II: Lord of Destruction	Blizzard; Blizzard North	Blizzard	Fantasy	MAC, WIN	Action RPG; Roguelike	Diablo; expansion to II	NA
2001 (UK)	The Elder Scrolls Adventures: Redguard	Bethesda	Sold Out	Fantasy	WIN (Rerel)	Action-adventure/RPG hybrid	The Elder Scrolls	NA
2001 (NA)	Fallout Tactics: Brotherhood of Steel	Micro Forté; 14° East	Interplay	Post-apocalyptic	WIN	Tactical RPG	Fallout	NA
2001 (JP); 2002 (NA)	Forever Kingdom	FromSoftware	JP: FromSoftware; NA: Agetec	Fantasy	PS2	Action RPG	Prequel to Evergrace	JP
2001 (NA)	Gamefest: Forgotten Realms Classics	SSI	Interplay	Fantasy	DOS (Comp), WIN (Comp)	WRPG	Dungeons & Dragons franchise; Comp. of 13 Forgotten Realms games	NA
2001 (INT)	Geneforge	Spiderweb	Spiderweb	Fantasy	MAC	Tactical RPG	Geneforge	NA
2001 (DE/NA)	Gothic	Piranha Bytes	Egmont; Xicat; Shoebox	Fantasy	WIN	Action RPG	Gothic	DE
2001 (NA)	Icewind Dale: Heart of Winter	Black Isle	Interplay	Fantasy	WIN	WRPG	Icewind Dale; Infinity Engine; Dungeons & Dragons franchise	NA
2001 (NA)	Icewind Dale: Heart of Winter – Trials of the Luremaster	Black Isle	Interplay	Fantasy	WIN	WRPG	Icewind Dale; Infinity Engine; Dungeons & Dragons franchise	NA
2001 (DE)	Planescape: Torment – Memorial Box	Black Isle	Virgin	Fantasy	WIN (Limit)	WRPG	Infinity Engine; Dungeons & Dragons franchise	NA
2001 (JP)	Medarot 4: Kabuto Version	Natsume Co., Ltd.	Imagineer	Science Fiction	GBC	Action RPG	Medabots	JP
2001 (JP)	Medarot 4: Kuwagata Version	Natsume Co., Ltd.	Imagineer	Science Fiction	GBC	Action RPG	Medabots	JP
2001 (JP)	Medarot 5: Susutake-mura no Tenkōsei: Kabuto Version	Natsume Co., Ltd.	Imagineer	Science Fiction	GBC	Action RPG	Medabots	JP
2001 (JP)	Medarot 5: Susutake-mura no Tenkōsei: Kuwagata Version	Natsume Co., Ltd.	Imagineer	Science Fiction	GBC	Action RPG	Medabots	JP
2001 (NA/EU)	Pool of Radiance: Ruins of Myth Drannor	Stormfront	Ubisoft	Fantasy	WIN	Action RPG	Pool of Radiance	NA
2001 (NA/UK)	Pool of Radiance: Ruins of Myth Drannor - Collector's Edition	Stormfront	Ubisoft	Fantasy	WIN (Limit)	Action RPG	Pool of Radiance	NA
2001 (JP)	Simulation RPG Tsukūru 95 Value!	Enterbrain	Enterbrain	N/A	WIN	Tactical RPG	RPG Maker	JP
2001 (JP)	Sakura Taisen 2: Kimi, Shinitamou koto Nakare	Red; Overworks	Sega	Steampunk	WIN (Port)	Tactical RPG	Sakura Wars	JP
2001 (JP)	ShadowFlare	Denyusha	Emurasoft	Fantasy	WIN	Action RPG		JP
2001 (NA/UK)	Summoner	Volition	THQ	Fantasy	WIN (Port), MAC (Port)	Action RPG	Summoner	NA
2001 (EU)	Technomage	Sunflowers	Sunflowers	Fantasy	PS1, WIN	Action RPG		DE
2001 (JP)	Tir-nan-og: The Forbidden Tower ティル・ナ・ノーグ<ダーナの末裔>	SystemSoft		Fantasy	WIN (Remake)	Tactical RPG	Tir-nan-og	JP
2001 (NA)	Wizardry 8	Sir-Tech	Sir-Tech	Fantasy; Sci-Fi	WIN	WRPG	Wizardry	NA
2001 (JP); 2018 (WW)	Zwei: The Arges Adventure	Nihon Falcom	Nihon Falcom (PC, PSP); Taito (PS2); Xseed Games (Windows)	Fantasy	PS2, PSP, WIN	Action RPG		JP
