= Ramot Polin =

Neighborhood of Ramot, an Israeli settlement in northwest East Jerusalem

Coordinates: 31°49′12″N 35°11′36″E

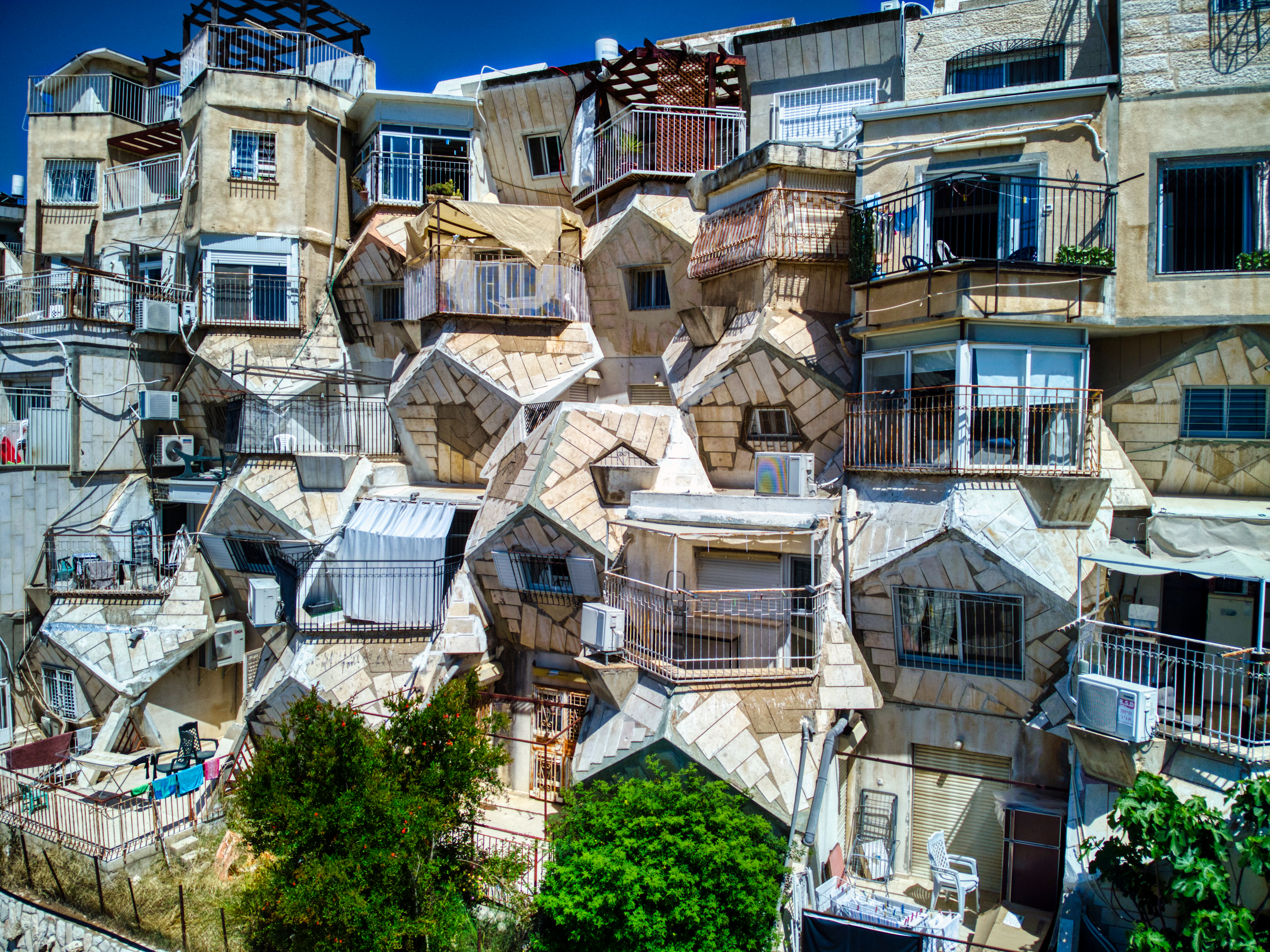
Ramot Polin, 2023

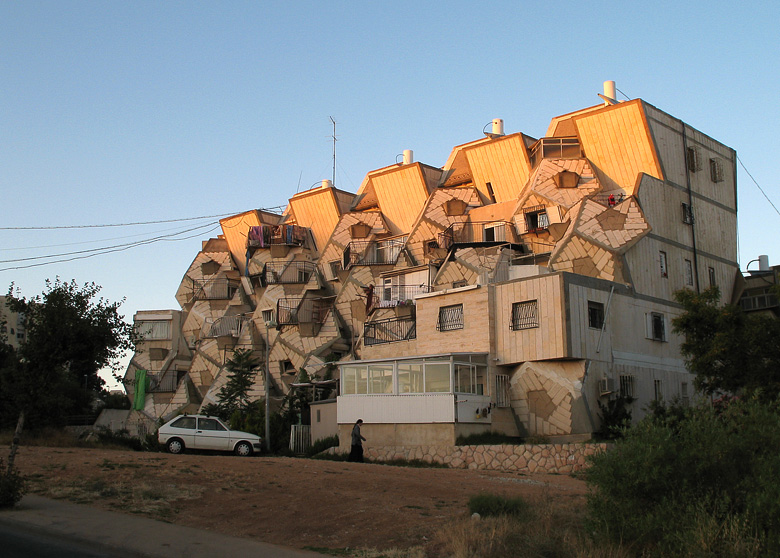
The architecturally controversial 'Ramot Polin Apartments', built in 1972, designed by modernist architect Zvi Hecker.

Ramot Polin (Hebrew: רמות פולין, lit. Poland Heights) is a neighborhood in the Israeli settlement of Ramot in northwest East Jerusalem consisting of a single housing complex. It was constructed by the Kollel Polen (Poland) in stages beginning in 1972, under the auspices of the Office for Building and Habitation, and is populated, as intended, mostly by Haredi Jewish families, including Breslov. The neighborhood contains 720 housing units of varying sizes.

== Planning and building ==
The background to building this neighborhood, as well as several other neighborhoods in Jerusalem - including additional sub-neighborhoods in Ramot and in Gilo, was to settle wide parts of Jerusalem through new building after the 1967 Six-Day War. This phenomenon was characterized by urban and architectural trials by many Israeli architects, building designers, and engineers to design new shapes of residential, community, and local structures. In charge of planning Ramot Polin was the Israeli architect Zvi Hecker for both the neighborhood and the architectural planning.

== History ==
Ramot Polin was built in 1972-75. It was designed by Zvi Hecker. It is an unusual prefabricated apartment complex with 720 non-rectangular components. The apartments were expanded later, incorporating more cubic rather than pentagonal components. The design idea of the neighborhood may seem to be purely geometrical, but it has been likened to a chemical structure.

The Ramot Polin complex has been named one of the "World's Strangest Buildings" and has been described as a "housing project for honeybees". The entire neighborhood is organized on a hill in central Ramot in a shape resembling a five-fingered hand or three-branched leaf. Each finger, which represents a different level of the building that lasted until the mid-1980s, is a series of 5-6 L-shaped apartment buildings incorporated in each other, creating a wide zigzag. In each of these fingers there is an inner courtyard, which was designed to remember the traditional courtyards of the older Jewish neighborhoods in Jerusalem.

== Gallery ==
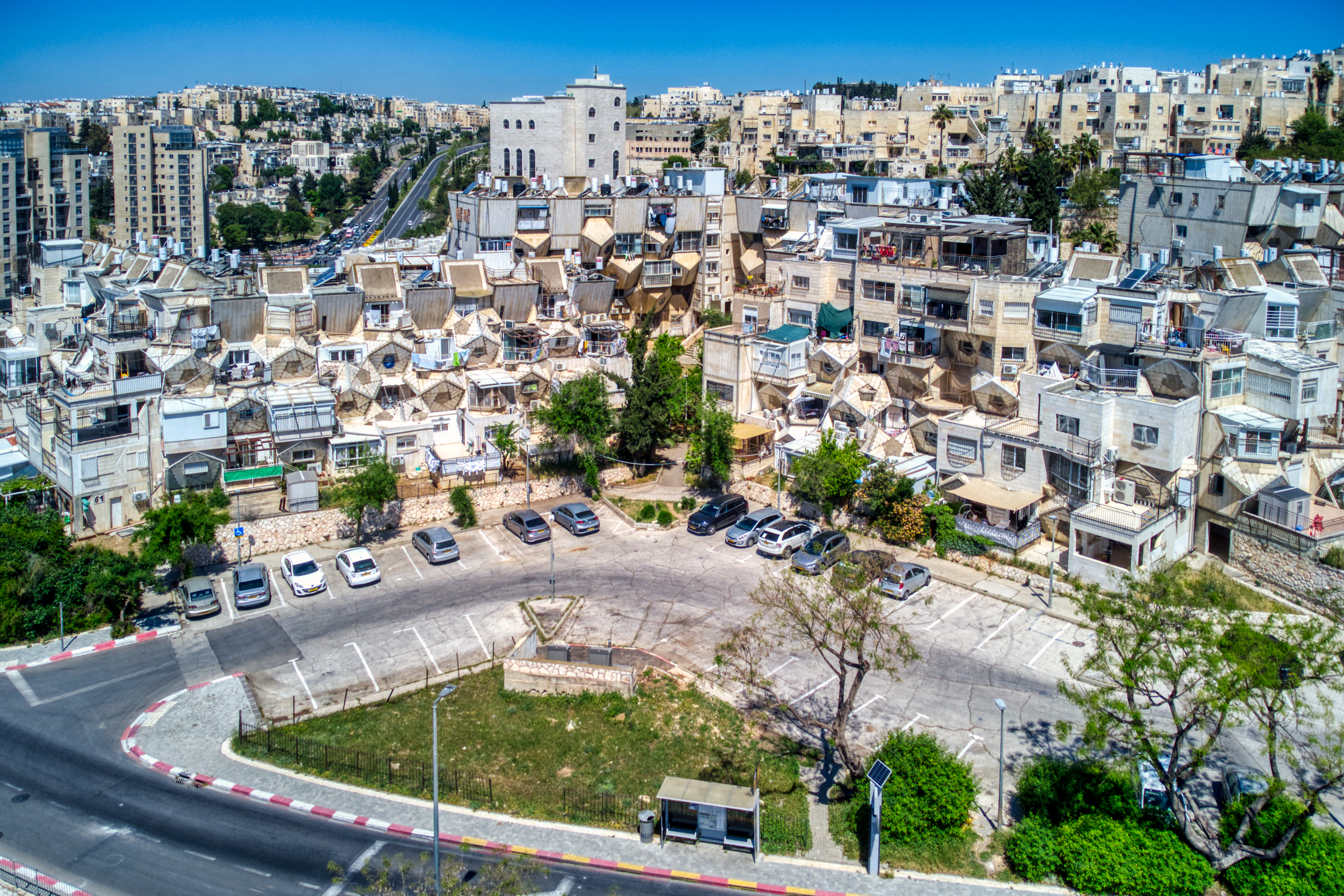
The front of Ramot Polin

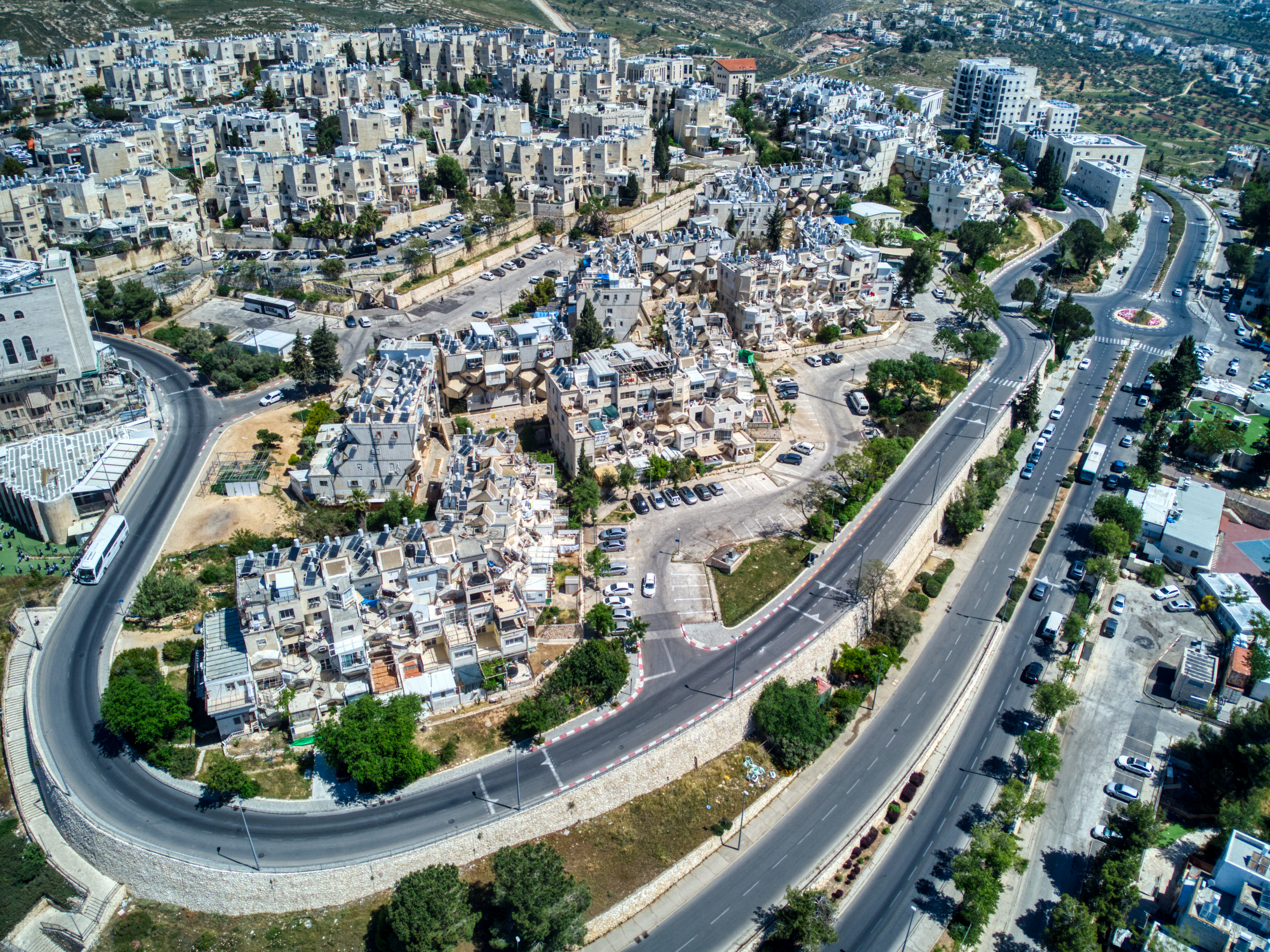
Ramot Polin from above

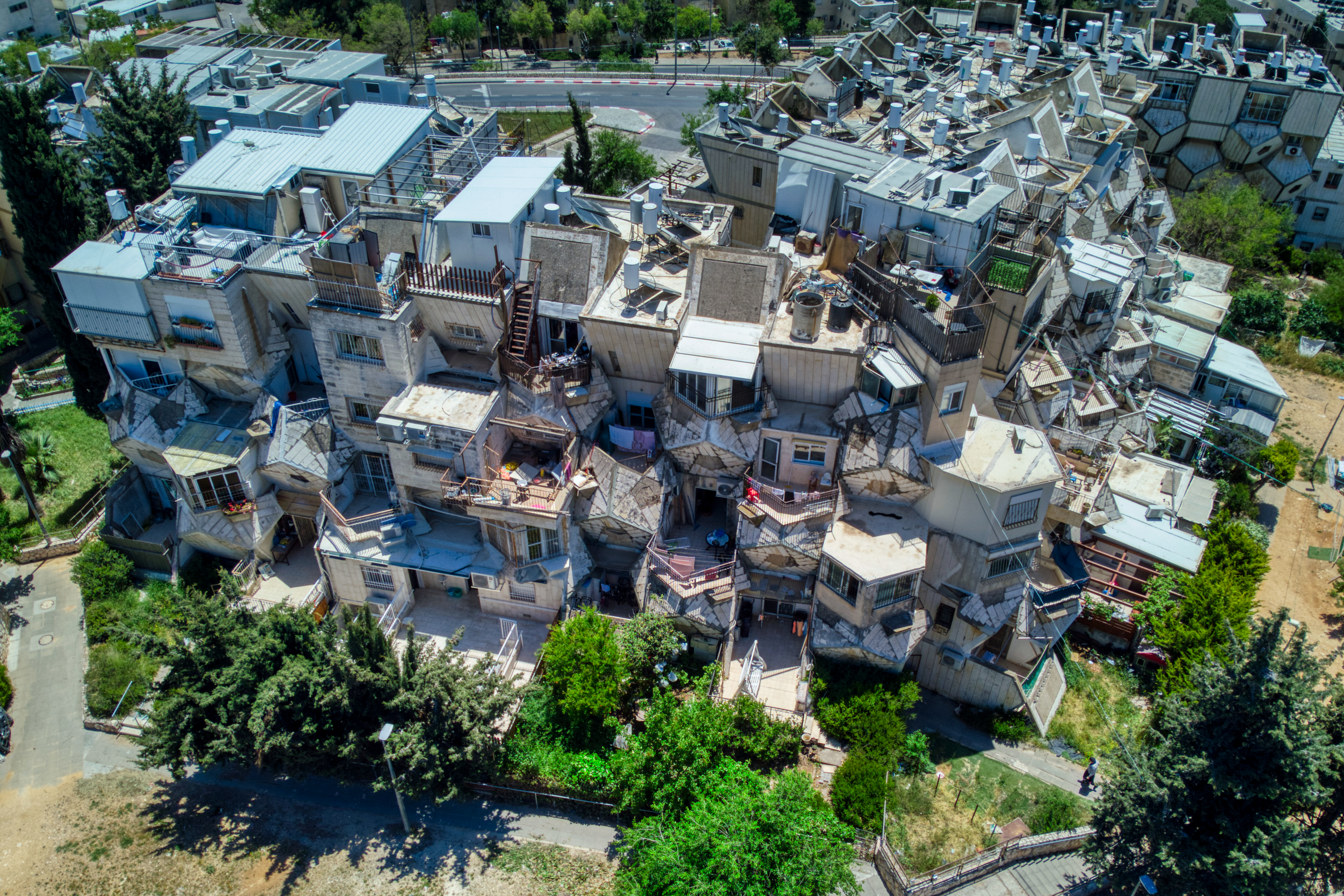
Residents improvisations in a Ramot Polin complex

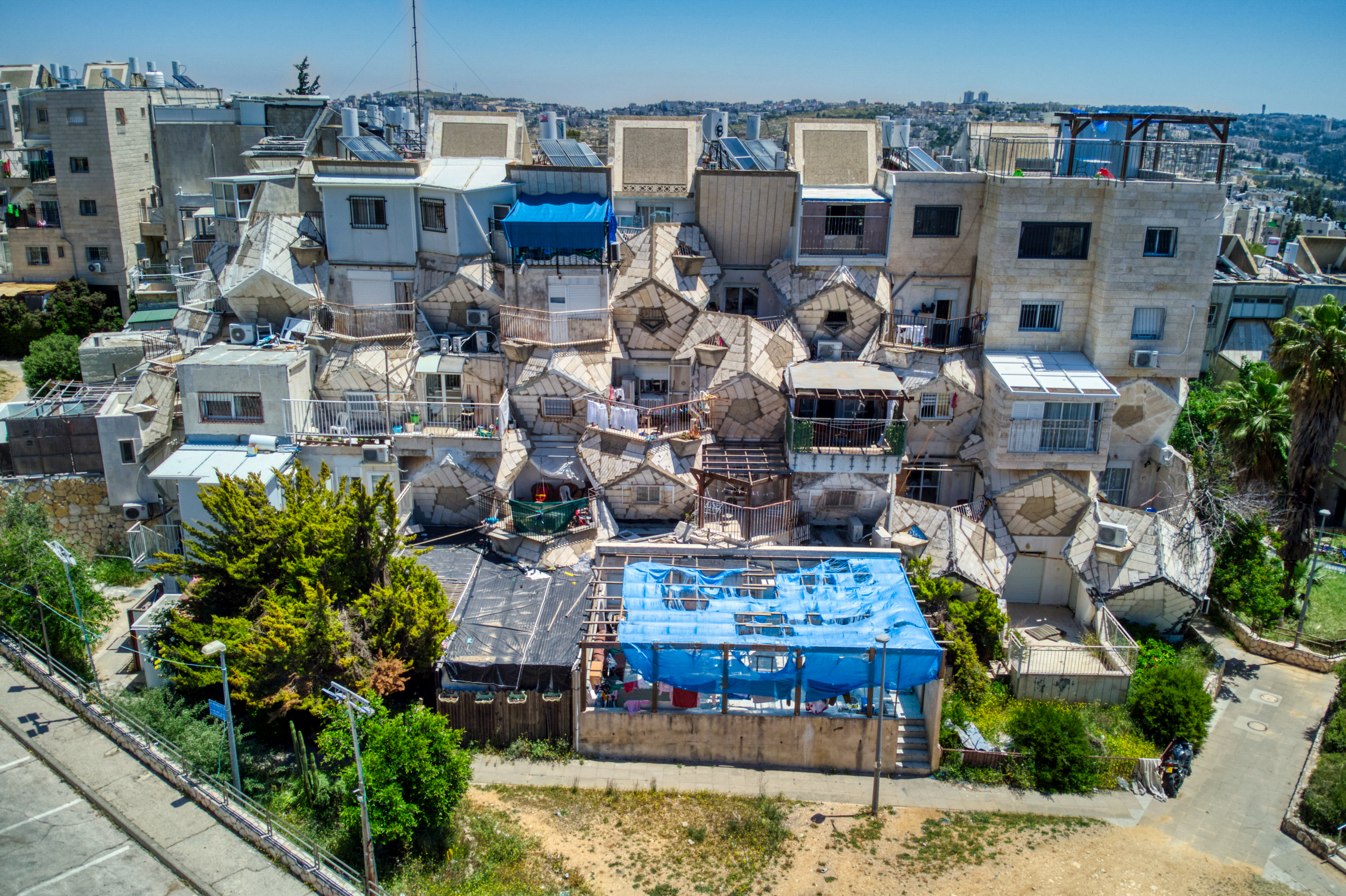
Adding cubic apartments above the beehive complex in a Ramot Polin complex

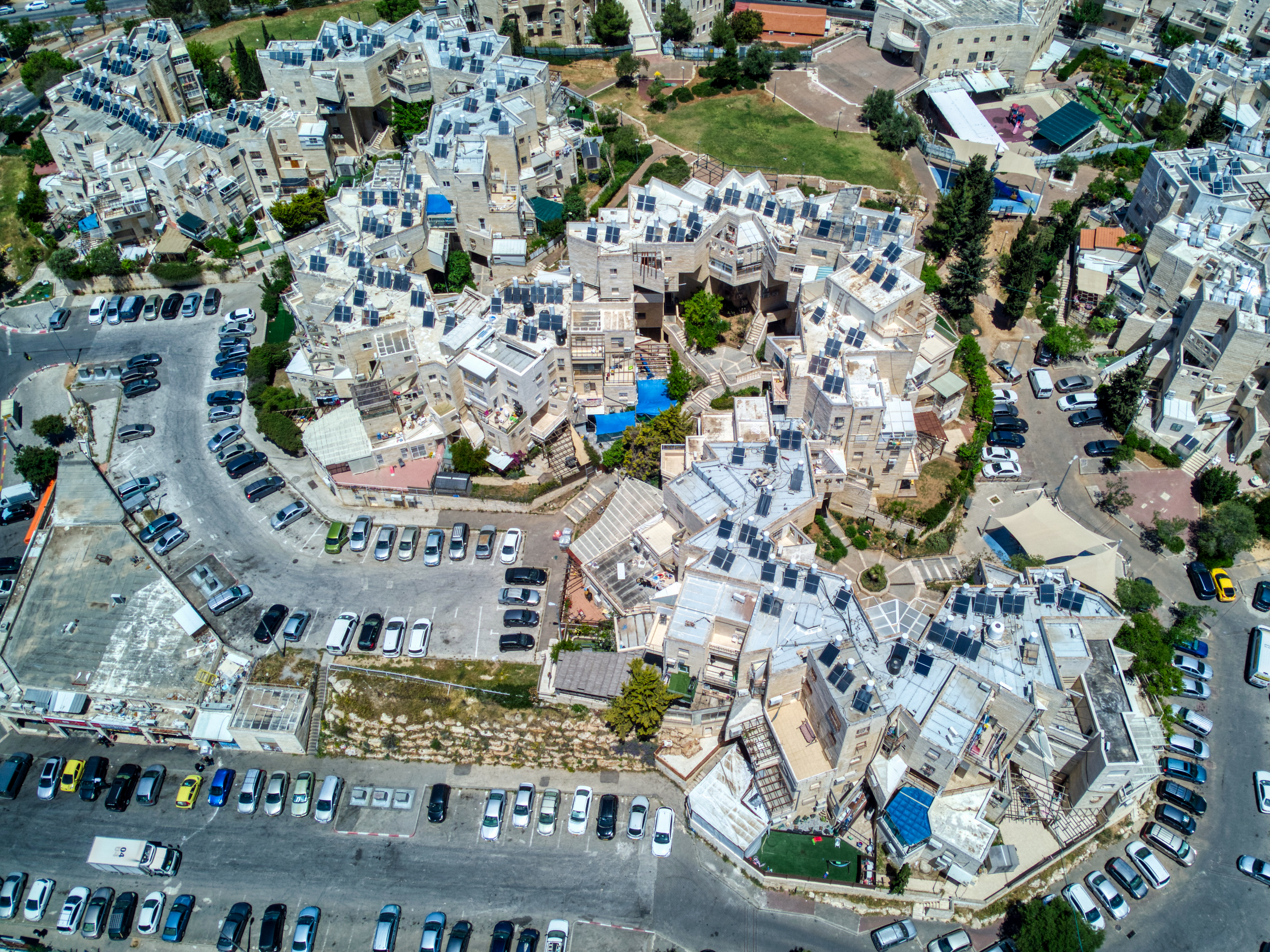
The second phase of Ramot Polin

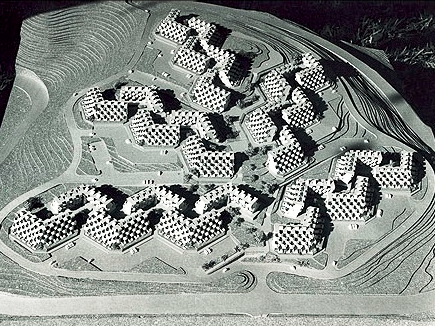
The model of Ramot Polin
