= Palmach Museum =

Museum in Tel Aviv, Israel

Coordinates: 32°6′16.23″N 34°47′56.98″E

- מוזיאון הפלמ"ח
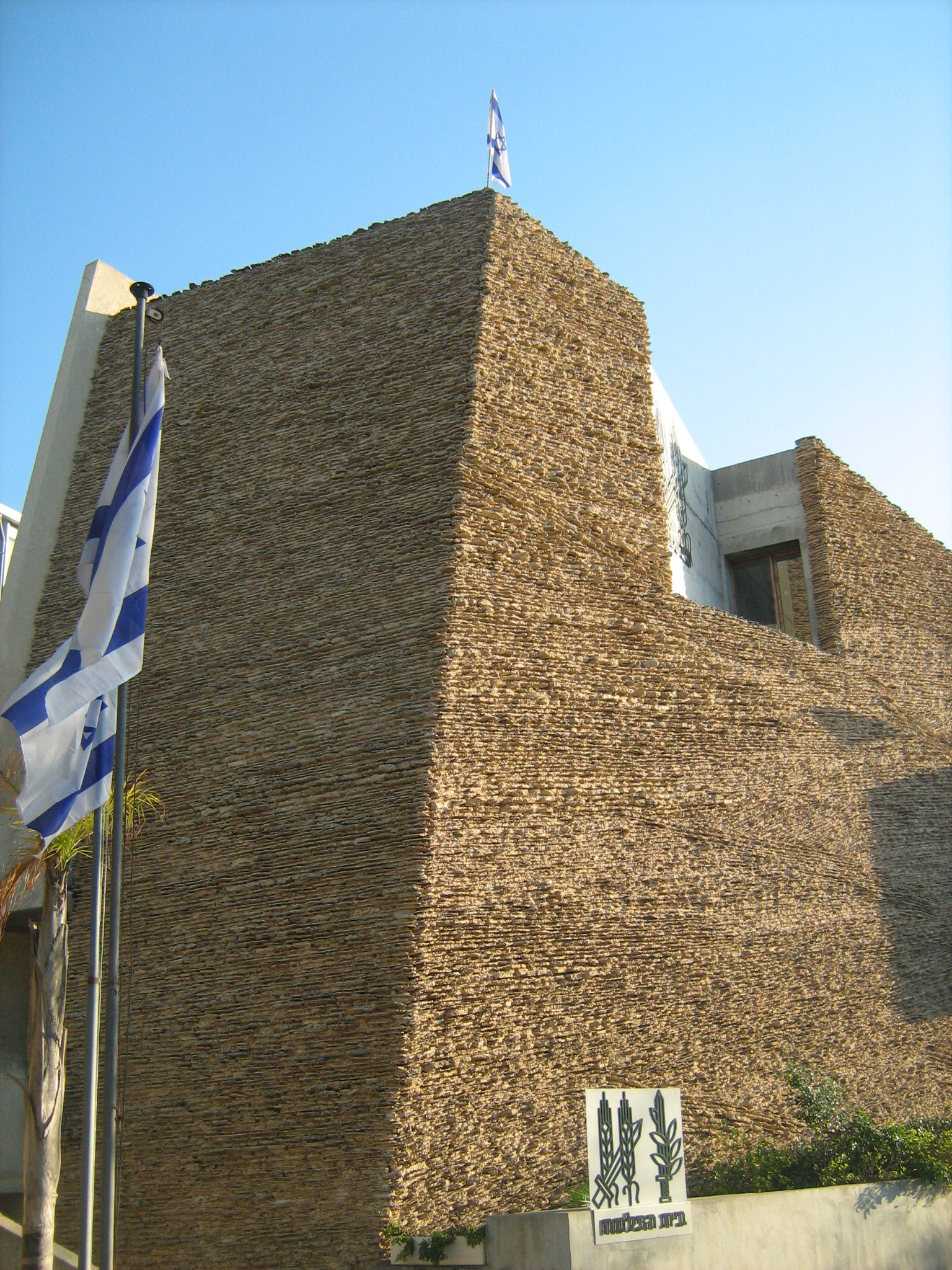
- Palmach Museum
- Established: 2000
- Location: Ramat Aviv, Israel
- Type: Military History
- Collections: Exhibits on the Palmach and its role in the creation of Israel
- Website: Palmach Museum

The Palmach Museum (Hebrew: מוזיאון הפלמ"ח) is a museum located in Ramat Aviv, Israel dedicated to the Palmach, the strike-force of the pre-state underground Haganah defense organization, which was later integrated into the Israel Defense Forces.

== History ==
Opened in 2000, the Palmach Museum commemorates the contribution of the Palmach to the creation of the State of Israel. It was designed by Israeli architects Zvi Hecker and Rafi Segal.

The museum is an underground series of multi-media experience chambers, starting with a memorial for the fallen.

== See also ==
- List of museums in Israel
