= Alfred Neumann (architect) =

Czech-born architect

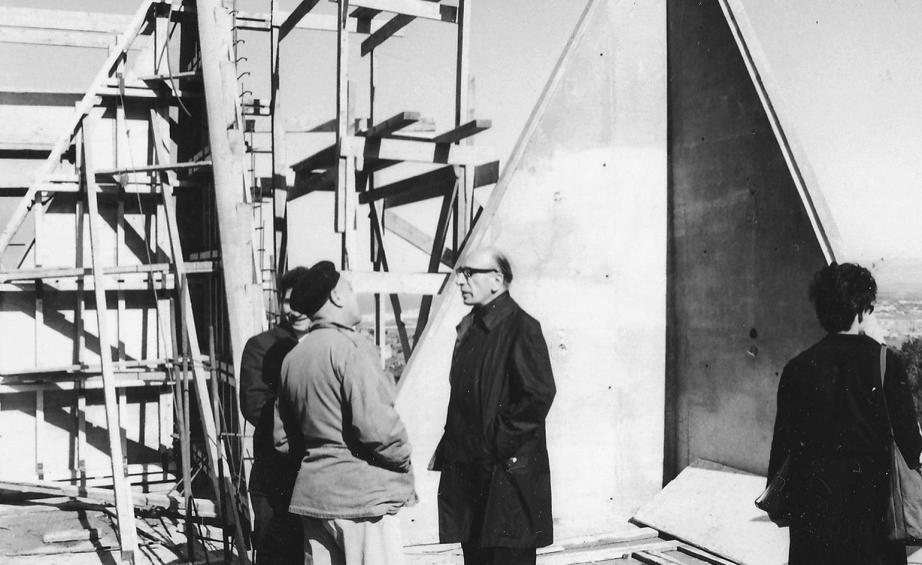
- Neumann in Haifa circa 1960
- Born: January 26, 1900; Vienna, Austria-Hungary
- Died: October 23, 1968 (aged 68); Québec, Canada
- Spouse: Naomi Neumann
- Children: Eva Marie Neumann
- Awards: Behrens Award

Alfred Neumann (January 26, 1900 – 1968) was an Austrian-born Israeli architect known for his modernist buildings.

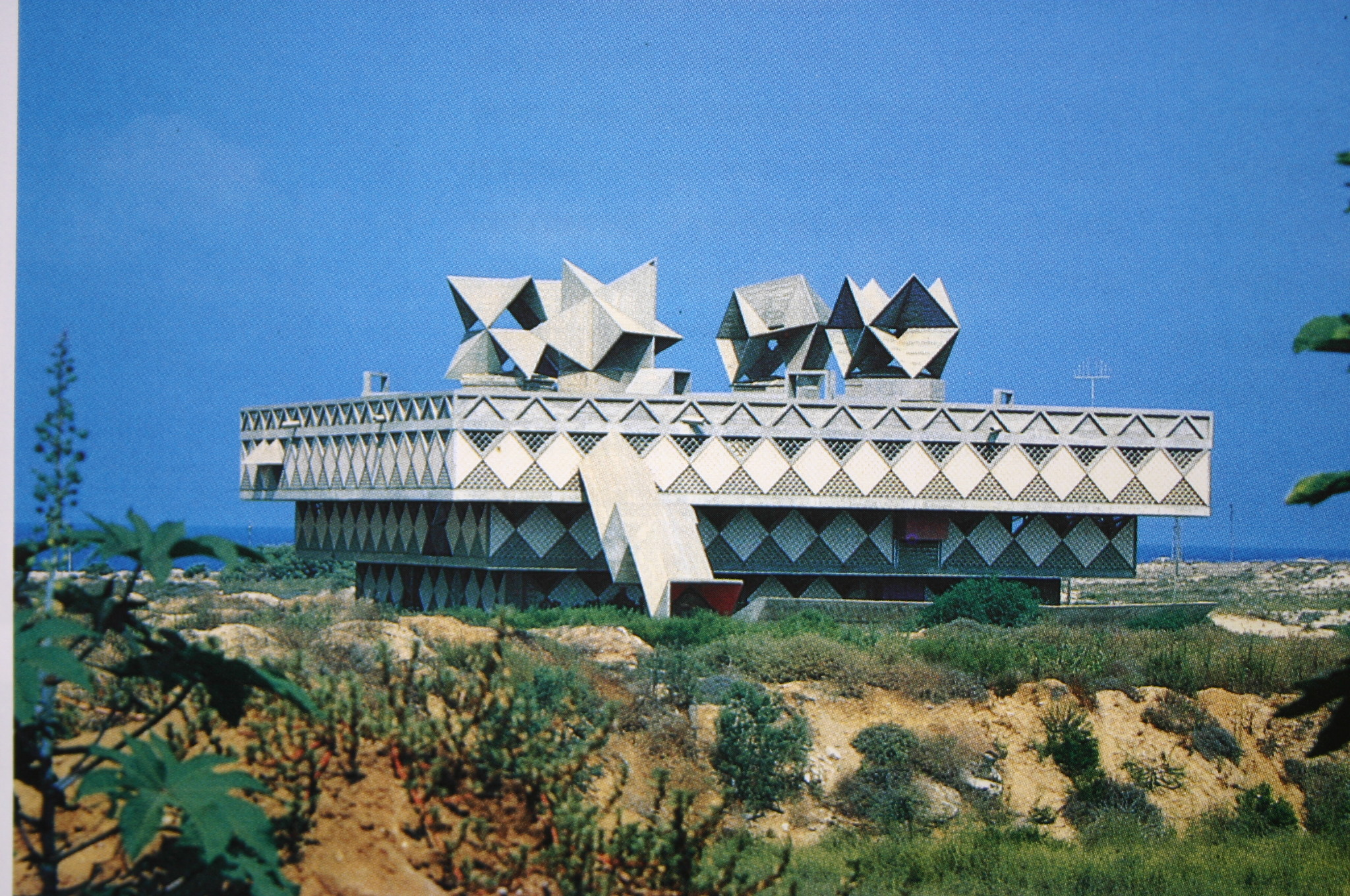
Bat Yam Town Hall (1963), Bat Yam, Israel by Neumann and Zvi Hecker

== Biography ==
Alfred Neumann was born in Vienna to Siegmund Neumann and Hermina Hickl. In 1910, Neumann's family moved to Brünn (today's Brno, Czech Republic), for his father's job at a joinery workshop. Neumann attended the German Building Technical College. Following his graduation, Neumann served in the Austro-Hungarian Army during World War I. After the war, he returned to his architecture studies, enrolling at the German Technical University in Brno. In 1922, Neumann returned to Vienna, where he attended Architecture College (Meisterschule für Architektur) of the Arts Academy in Vienna, studying under Peter Behrens. For the following 6 years, he worked at a number of architecture offices in Paris and Berlin with contemporaries including Auguste Perret. In 1928 and 1929, Neumann worked briefly in Algiers, French Algeria.

In February 1945, Neumann was deported from his home in Prague to the Nazi ghetto and concentration camp of Theresienstadt in the Protectorate of Bohemia and Moravia. After World War II, Neumann returned to Brno. In the following years, he worked at the Provincial Study and Planning Institute of Czechoslovakia where he contributed to a number of projects in the country.

In 1949, Neumann immigrated to Israel where his practice shifted towards the development of modular structures

In 1962, Neumann married Naomi, a former student of his. Their daughter, Eva Marie Neumann, was born that year.

Neumann died of lung cancer while teaching in Quebec as a visiting professor at the Université Laval.

== Academic career ==
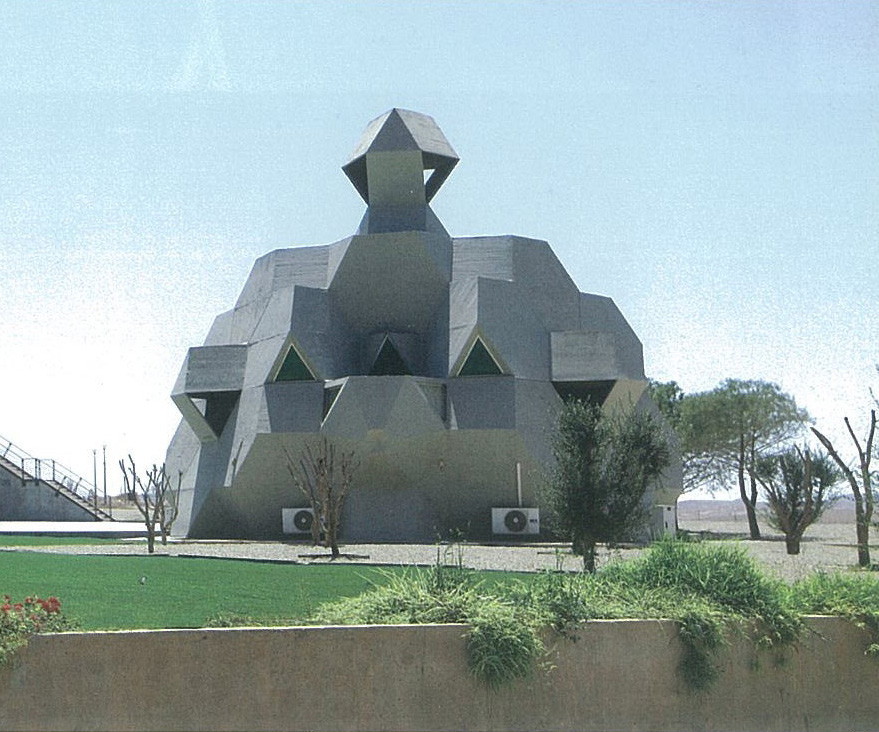
Synagogue (1967), Mitzpe Ramon, Israel by Neumann and Zvi Hecker

Neumann taught at the Israel Institute of Technology and served as the dean from 1952 to 1966. 1956, he published a pamphlet that called for architecture that better responded to human needs by reinventing systems of proportion and measurement and the design of buildings through the use of smaller modular subdivisions.

During his tenure at the Israel Institute of Technology, Neumann worked closely with architect Zvi Hecker.

== See also ==
- Architecture of Israel
