= Zvi Hecker =

Polish-born Israeli architect (1931–2023)

- צבי הקר
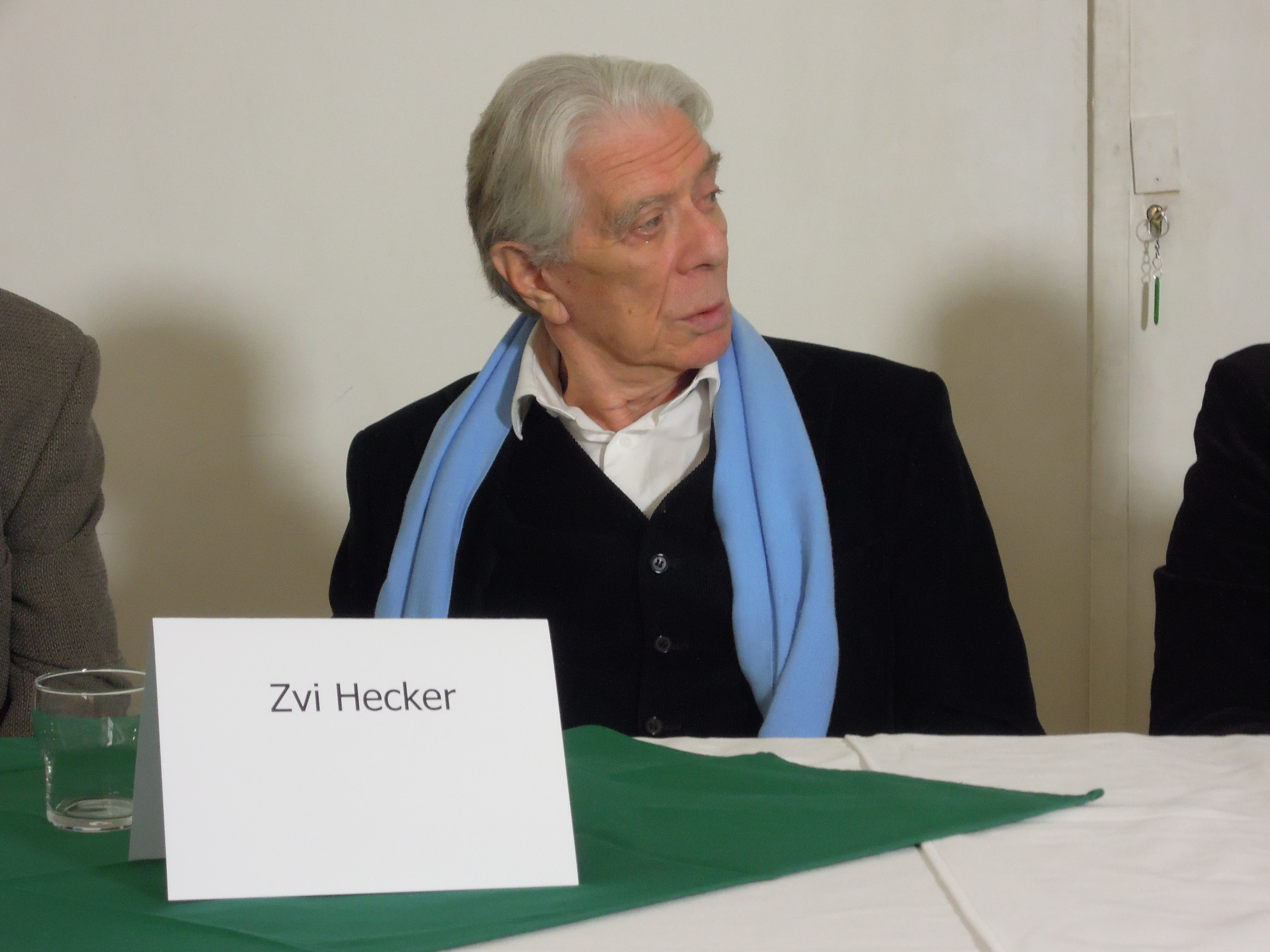
- Hecker in 2014
- Born: Tadeusz Hecker; 31 May 1931; Kraków, Poland
- Died: 24 September 2023 (aged 92); Berlin, Germany
- Education: Cracow University of Technology; Technion – Israel Institute of Technology; Avni Institute of Art and Design
- Occupation: Architect

Zvi Hecker (Hebrew: צבי הקר; 31 May 1931 – 24 September 2023) was a Polish-born Israeli architect. His work is known for its emphasis on geometry and asymmetry.

== Biography ==
Zvi Hecker was born as Tadeusz Hecker in Kraków, Poland. He grew up in Poland and Samarkand. He began his education in architecture at the Cracow University of Technology. He immigrated to Israel in 1950. There he studied architecture at the Technion - Israel Institute of Technology, graduating in 1955. At the Technion, Eldar Sharon was a classmate, and Alfred Neumann was their professor. Between 1955 and 1957, he studied painting at the Avni Institute of Art and Design, before beginning his career as an architect. Between 1957 and 1959, Hecker served in the Combat Engineering Corps of the Israel Defense Forces.

Hecker died in his Berlin home on 24 September 2023, at the age of 92.

== Architectural career ==
After his military service, he founded a firm with Eldar Sharon (until 1964) and Alfred Neumann (until 1966). The physical and economic conditions in Israel at the time, allowed them to complete a fair number of works in a relatively brief period of time, which brought international attention. Their joint works include the Mediterranean Sea Club in Achzib (1960–1961), Dubiner House (1963), the Chaim Laskov Officer Training School (1963–1967) Bahad 1, the main officer training school of the Israel Defense Forces, just later the synagogue (1969–1971) at the same academy, and the Bat Yam city hall (1963–1969). Their designs shared aspects in common with the metabolist movement, borrowing metaphoric shapes from nature for use in planning morphological structures. The modularity of these works, such as the Dubiner House, provided an architectural precedent for the Habitat 67 project by Moshe Safdie.

Hecker resided in Berlin and Tel Aviv. He was involved in planning projects for the German Jewish community as well as other international projects.

== Academic career ==
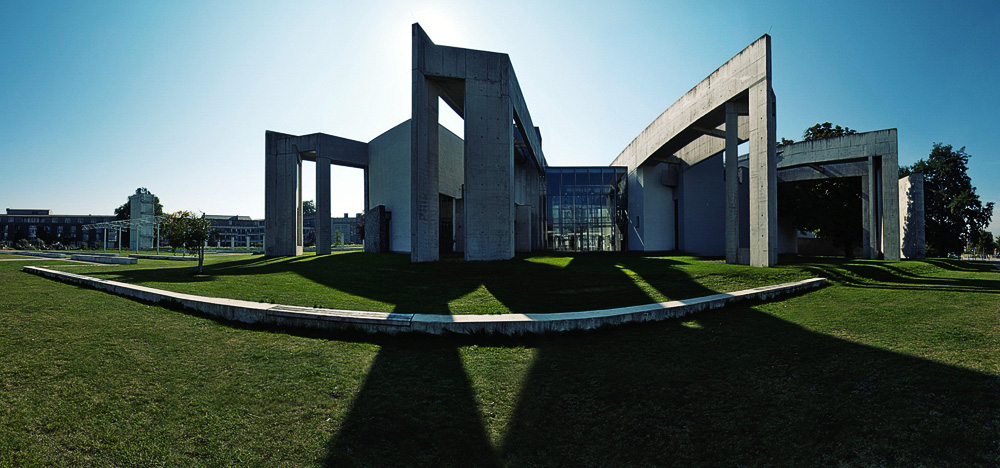
Jewish Community Center in Duisburg, Germany

Hecker taught in Canada, the United States, Israel, and Austria at the Université Laval, University of Texas at Arlington, Washington University in St. Louis, Iowa State University, Technion – Israel Institute of Technology, and the University of Applied Arts Vienna. Zvi Hecker wrote about his work periodically, co-authoring books with Sir Peter Cook, John Hejduk, and others.

== Projects ==
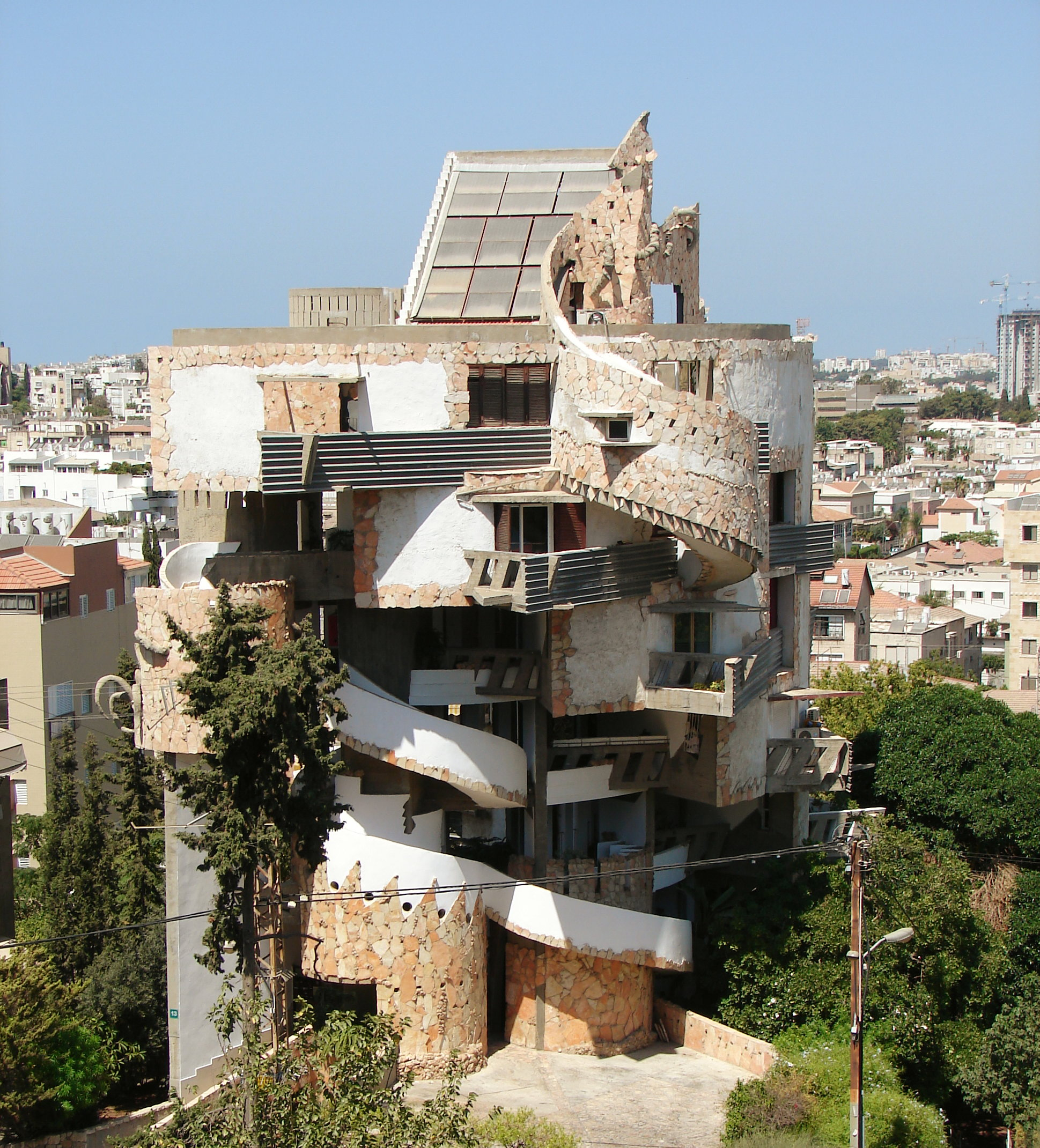
The Spiral Apartment House in Ramat Gan

The early projects of Zvi Hecker, designed in partnership with Sharon and Neumann, have architectural qualities that were developed later in his career. The officer school (Bahad 1) was built to give a respectable living environment to soldiers in the Negev desert, and special emphasis was given to the large spaces between the structures, in order to form a micro-environment there, separating the people inside from the harsh desert outskirts. Raw concrete was chosen because it did not require constant maintenance and renovation in light of the strong sandy winds. About the school, Hecker said: "The location of the base has a special relevance to the vision of David Ben-Gurion. To build such an important school in a place which isn't the center of the country – in my opinion, that's the positive side of the State of Israel". The academy was supplemented later with a synagogue, whose form was complementary and contrasting. The Oxford Dictionary of Architecture and Landscape Architecture says of the architect's approach to its design, "Eschewing the right angles of international modernism, he turned to crystalline geometry found in nature [...]"

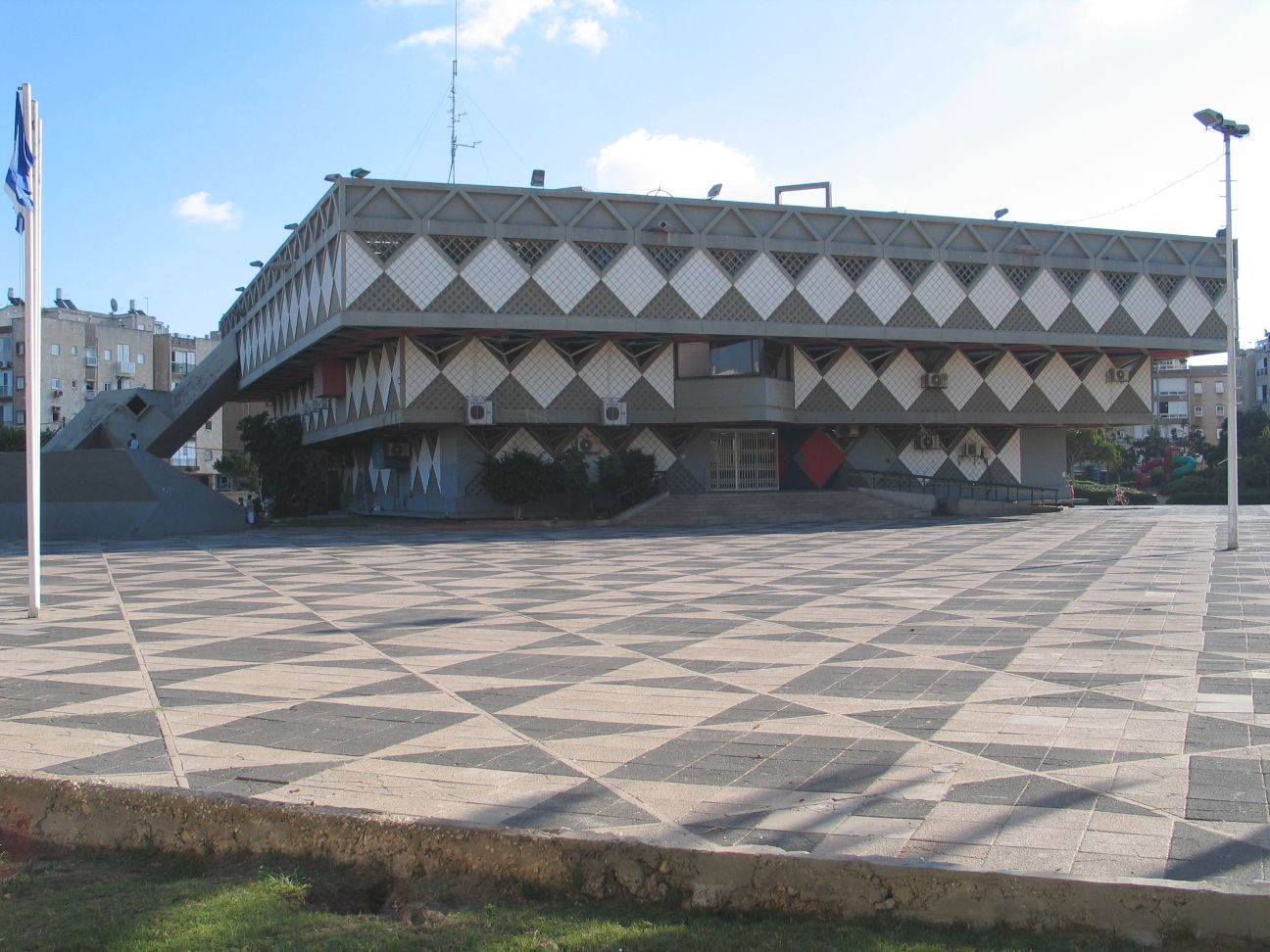
Bat Yam City Hall

Another of the Zvi Hecker's projects in partnership, the Bat Yam City Hall shows the recurrence of geometrical invention that exists throughout his work. One architectural significance of the Bat Yam City Hall- its formal concept, is that it is an inverted pyramid. It is linked to other works of architecture such as Boston City Hall through this form, in addition to their program, similar materials, and time period. The building is patterned on a diagonal grid with concrete, which provides both its structure and aesthetics. The importance of this building was recognized in 1975 with perspective and section illustrations on a postage stamp in the Architecture in Israel series. As of 2003, Bat Yam City Hall was removed of its signature light shafts, rather than having them renovated. This was because of a perceived structural instability due to weathering over time. Of this removal Dr. Ami Ran wrote, "From an architectural standpoint, removing them is equivalent to dousing the Statue of Liberty's torch."

Among several projects for memorials, Zvi Hecker designed the solemn Page Memorial (1996) with Micha Ullmann and Eyal Weizman. This site-specific memorial commemorates the Jewish community of Kreuzberg, and their Lindenstrasse synagogue which was designed in 1891 by architects Cremer & Wolffenstein. What was once one of the largest religious buildings in Berlin, with a capacity of 1800; was ruined by the Nazis in the 1938 Kristallnacht pogrom. On the original floor plan, the benches of the synagogue were recreated in concrete, and where the bimah stood, trees are now planted. The designers conceived of the benches as sentences on the pages of the Talmud.

== Architectural style ==
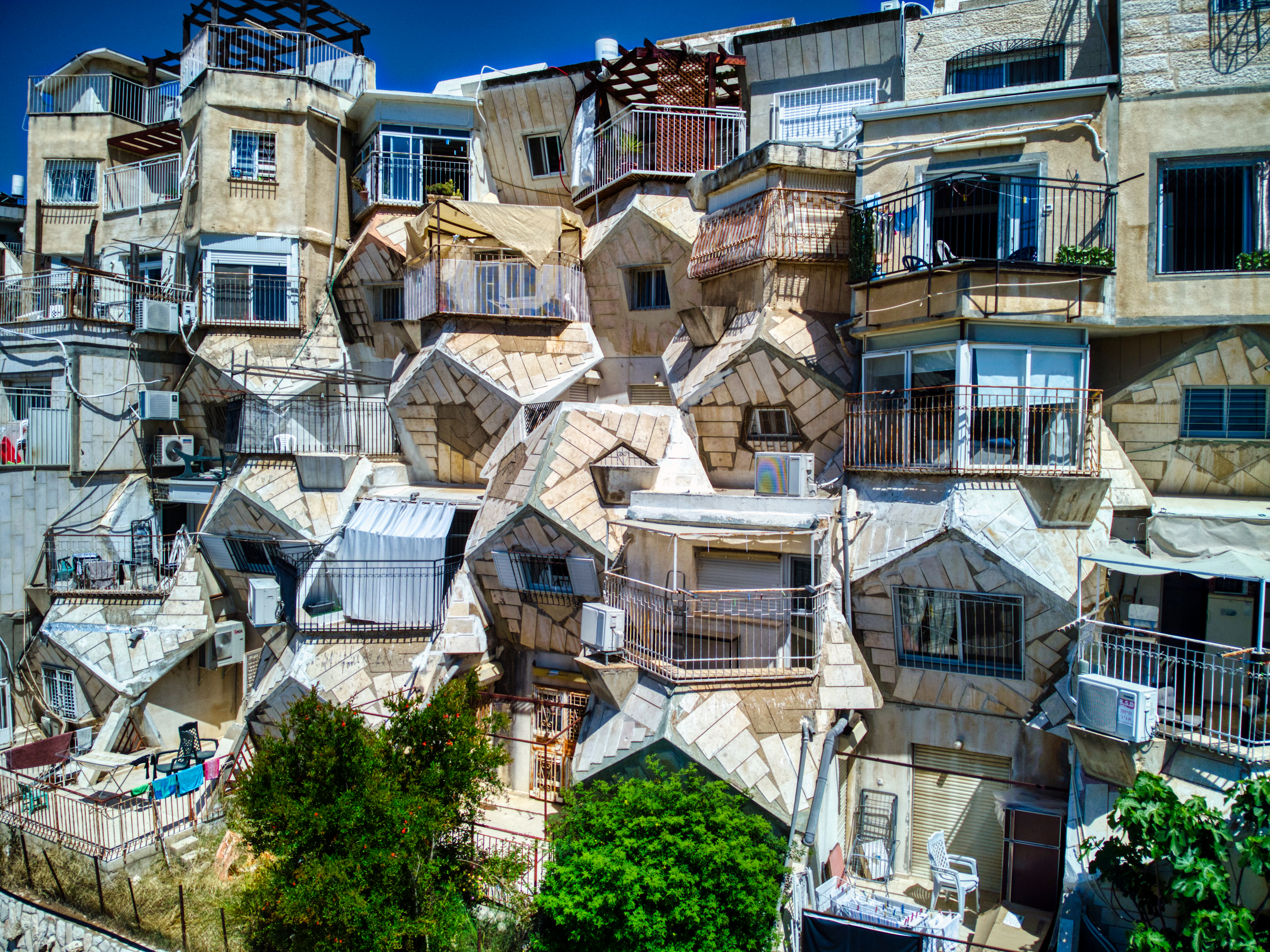
Ramot Polin Apartments

Zvi Hecker architecture has continued to emphasize geometry and modularity, but with increasing asymmetry. Ramot Polin (1972–75) is a rare prefabricated apartment complex with 720 non-rectangular components. The apartments were expanded later, incorporating more cubic rather than pentagonal components. The design idea of this neighborhood may seem to be the more purely geometrical, however it is likened to a chemical structure, and in plan view to an open hand, and a leaf- therefore imparting it with metaphorical qualities. More examples of advanced geometry in Hecker's work are the Spiral Apartment House in Ramat Gan, (1981–1989), and the Heinz-Galinski-Schule (1992–1995) in Berlin, noted for their high degree of complexity. The Heinz-Galinski-Schule won Zvi Hecker the Deutscher Kritikerpreis in 1995- it was stated that the decision of the jury was based on their appreciation of the "expressive geometry of his construction." The Spiral Apartment House is located adjacent to his earlier Dubiner house, providing a juxtaposition of two important moments in his career. The work of Zvi Hecker has been compared to that of Antoni Gaudí, for expressiveness and expanding of architectural ideas.

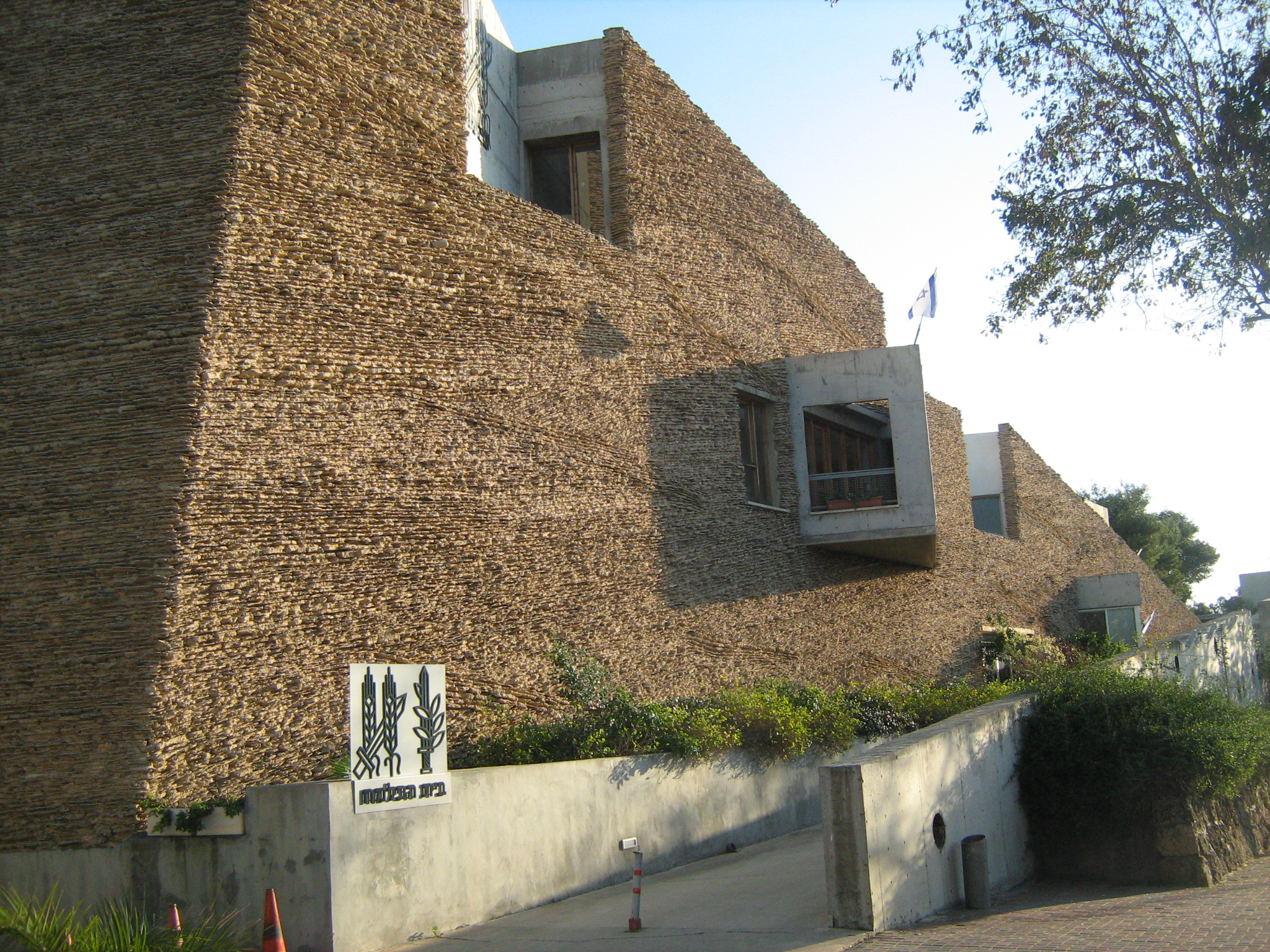
Palmach Museum in Tel Aviv

More of his later works are the Jewish community center in Duisburg (1996–1999), and with Rafi Segal, the Palmach Museum in Tel Aviv (1995–2000). The Duisburg Jewish community center is located on a park, the Garten der Erinnerung designed by Dani Karavan. The community center shares a similar concept to the Page Memorial in its likening to the open pages of a book, and symbolically the Torah of Moses. The Palmach Museum has an angular zig-zag plan positioned around the preservation of trees on the site. It is clad in a local sandstone that was found in excavations for the project. It was exhibited at the Venice Biennale.

== Museum exhibits ==
Hecker was the subject of a solo exhibition at the Israel Museum in 1976. He had solo exhibitions at the Tel Aviv Museum of Art in the 1980s and in 1996. He also took part in the Jewish Identity in Contemporary Architecture at the Jewish Museum Berlin in 2005, and participated in the Venice Biennale on a number of occasions.
