= Silver (video game) =

1999 action role-playing video game

- European cover art
- Developers: Infogrames UK, Spiral House (Note: Spiral House was an internal division of publisher Infogrames UK until release. Subesequent ports of the game are credited to Spiral House.)
- Publisher: Infogrames
- Producer: Lee Clare
- Designers: Warren Lancashire; Sam Evans
- Programmers: Bobby Earl; Robbie Tinman
- Platforms: Microsoft Windows, Mac OS, Dreamcast, Linux
- Release: Windows: GER: March 18, 1999; NA: September 30, 1999; Dreamcast: NA: June 28, 2000; EU: June 30, 2000; Mac OS: UK: June 30, 2000; NA: 2000; Linux: WW: June 2, 2017
- Genre: Action RPG
- Mode: Single player

Silver is a 1999 video game developed and published by Infogrames for Microsoft Windows and Mac OS, and ported by Spiral House to the Dreamcast in 2000. The game is a fantasy-themed action-roleplaying game where players lead the protagonist David in a small party of three to defeat the tyrannical sorcerer Silver, who has kidnapped his wife Jennifer. The game features three-dimensional graphics and is presented in a top-down perspective, with prerendered backgrounds. The developers aimed to create an engaging combat system, in which players command attacks using the direction of the computer mouse or analog stick, and focused on real-time combat in contrast to the turn-based design of console role-playing games of the time. Prior to release, the game received pre-release anticipation that the title could become a competitor with Japanese role-playing games, including the Final Fantasy series, and fill a gap in the catalog of role-playing games available on the Dreamcast.

Upon release, Silver received mixed reviews, with critics praising the combat system, environment design and audio. However, many critics felt that the execution of gameplay elements led to frustration, including the game's party management during combat, location-based save system, and map design. The performance of the development team prompted the publisher to support them to found an independent studio, Spiral House, to create ports of Infrogrames titles for other systems. A sequel to Silver was briefly developed by Spiral House, but discontinued. Following release, Silver received a nomination for the D.I.C.E. Award for Outstanding Achievement in Original Music Composition at the 3rd Annual Interactive Achievement Awards. The game has received retrospective praise for its combat system, which has been described as innovative for its time.

== Gameplay ==
Characters in Silver are displayed in 3D against prerendered backgrounds.

The objective of gameplay is to explore the game world to collect eight orbs throughout the game world to gain the power to defeat the sorcerer Silver. Controlling up to three characters, players can recruit various characters they meet throughout the game into their team. Players navigate and use items with point-and-click interaction on the PC and the controller on the Dreamcast. An icon-based pie menu providing access to the character options, inventory, items, and special moves on both systems. In the PC version, party members can be selected individually or all together, and players can change freely between them at any time. The Dreamcast version features control of one character at a time only. The game simplifies role-playing game mechanics, with two stats for hit points for health and magic points to cast spells. Player statistics and levels increment automatically when progressing the plot by defeating a boss, requiring no player input or use of experience points. A world map is accessible from the pie menu and allows players to transport back to previously visited locations.

Combat is done in real-time, although players can pause during battle. Players enter a combat encounter when in a room with monsters, and cannot exit until the monsters are defeated; once fought, most monsters are removed from the game. To fight enemies, players control one party member to attack in real time and can assign the other two characters to automatically use their own offensive or defensive abilities. For instance, players can select modes for supporting characters to attack the target, or the nearest target that players are currently attacking. For the active character, combat abilities can be used by pressing the control key and sliding the computer mouse in the specified direction to simulate thrusts or slashes of their weapon, or direct button controls on the Dreamcast. Progress is saved by interacting with a character named The Chronicler, who appears in certain locations in-game, requiring players to return to those locations to save the game.

== Plot ==
Silver is set in the island region of Jarrah, which is ruled by the tyrannical sorcerer Silver from his fortress, Metalon. The story follows David, a young man living peacefully in the Forest of Verdante with his wife Jennifer and his grandfather. When Silver decides to take a new bride, his forces abduct women across Jarrah, and Jennifer is captured by Silver's son, Fuge. David and his grandfather pursue her but arrive too late to rescue her, learning instead of a growing resistance movement opposing Silver's rule. Their journey soon turns tragic when Fuge murders David's grandfather and reveals his role in the death of David's father, leaving David to continue on his quest alone.

David joins the resistance, which seeks to overthrow Silver, but repeatedly fails to intercept the ship carrying the captured women. An ancient prophecy reveals that Silver can only be defeated using eight magical spheres, each tied to a different aspect of Jarrah and hidden across the islands. David and his allies travel through a variety of hostile regions, including frozen caverns, underwater ruins, and corrupted cities, to recover the spheres, often battling powerful guardians. As the quest progresses, Silver's forces strike back, and the resistance is nearly destroyed by a trap orchestrated by Fuge. David eventually confronts and kills Fuge, rescuing the captured resistance leader and stabilizing what remains of the group.

Further revelations expose betrayal within the resistance and uncover Silver's greater plan: he intends to sacrifice the women of Jarrah to cement a pact with the demon Apocalypse, a bargain that began when Silver murdered his own wife. With help from Silver's daughter Glass, who secretly opposes her father, David weakens Metalon and prepares for a final assault. In the climax, David and his companions confront Silver in his throne room, where Silver kills the traitorous rebel William before being defeated through the combined power of the eight spheres. After Silver's fall, the demon Apocalypse attempts to fulfill its pact regardless, but David and his allies defeat it with the aid of Nemesis, ending the threat permanently. Metalon collapses, the surviving heroes escape, and Jarrah is freed from Silver's rule. David is reunited with Jennifer, and the story concludes with the promise of peace for the islands of Jarrah.

== Development and release ==
Silver was developed by the United Kingdom division of Infogrames, based in Manchester. Development of Silver commenced in 1995, and was conceived by Warren Lancashire, who left the project early in development. Producer Lee Claire was hired by Infogrames twelve months into development, supported by a 25-person team consisting of former members of Ocean Software acquired by the company, including lead programmer Bobby Earl, lead environment designer Jack Wikeley, and lead character designer Christian Johnson. Clare stated the real-time combat design was made as a response to turn-based which seemed "naturally the next step away from turn-based RPGs of the time", including console releases in the Final Fantasy and Phantasy Star series. The developers originally explored turn-based combat, with Wikeley stating that it "soon became apparent this didn't make for exciting gameplay". The visual design of Silver was inspired by Dune II and Heart of Darkness. The game's environment design features 3D characters, with all backgrounds prerendered using 3D Studio software. Claire recounted that the team was under a "lot of pressure" from Infrogrames to publish Silver by Christmas 1999, despite lacking the staff to script levels in the time available.

Silver was showcased in the form of previews at several trade shows including the 1998 European Computer Trade Show E3 in May 1999 and 2000, and Milia in February 2000. Upon publication, Infogrames funded the development team to set up an independent studio, Spiral House, to port Silver to other platforms including Mac OS and the Dreamcast. Development on a sequel was undertaken by Spiral House, with some pre-production work completed, but plans were abandoned as Infogrames moved their attention to other licenses and instead offered the company to develop ports to Alone in the Dark 4 .

=== Re-release ===
In June 2013, Nordic Games announced they had acquired several games under the intellectual property of Atari, including Silver. The game was republished by THQ Nordic (Note: Nordic Games was renamed to THQ Nordic in August 2016 after acquiring the THQ trademark.) on Steam in June 2017, featuring compatibility with current operating systems and resolutions.

== Reception ==
=== Pre-release ===
Pre-release reception of Silver was positive. Preview coverage widely compared the game to Final Fantasy, and was purported to be a Western killer competitor for the series, with Edge stating the game featured "epic proportions usually expected from Japanese games of this kind". The developers stated games such as Final Fantasy VII had been released after development commenced and similarities to the series were only coincidental. Critics also praised the scope of the game's locations, its visual design and combat control scheme. Pre-release coverage for the Dreamcast also highlighted it filled a gap of few role-playing video games for the system. IGN was impressed by the ECTS preview, praising the graphics and sound as "polished", and considering the real-time combat would "appeal to those who want a little more swing in their combat". Describing the game as visually "on course to be the best-looking RPG to date", Chris Anderson of PC Zone expected that Western players "will surely take to real-time combat more readily than to the sometimes tedious turn-based action typical of games in this genre". Total Control praised the real-time combat and visual presentation, although cautioned that the game's simpler design may not appeal to computer computer role-playing game players and games in this style had not been as successful on the platform.

=== Reviews ===
Reception

Aggregate score
Aggregator	Score	
Aggregator	Dreamcast	PC
GameRankings	67%	74%

Review scores
Publication	Score	
Publication	Dreamcast	PC
AllGame	3/5	4/5
Computer Games Strategy Plus	N/A	2.5/5
Computer Gaming World	N/A	3.5/5
Game Informer	8/10	N/A
GamePro	4.5/5	2/5
GameSpot	5.8/10	7.4/10
GameSpy	6/10	67%
IGN	7.9/10	7.1/10
Next Generation	3/5	3/5

Upon release, Silver received mixed reviews, according to review aggregator GameRankings. Some critics responded to anticipation the game could be a "Final Fantasy killer", and expressed divided views on whether it met the standard of other Japanese style RPGs such as Final Fantasy VII, although others reflected the game did not resemble the series in gameplay mechanics. Neil Mouneimne of Computer Games Strategy Plus stated whilst the game had "uncanny" similarities to Final Fantasy and was a "package of beauty, plot, and style poised to rival the best from Japan", it was "quickly apparent" from the gameplay it was different in nature and let down by buggy gameplay and a "frustrating" combat system.

Critics generally praised the gameplay design and combat of Silver. Several reviewers stated that the simplified real-time combat system was a highlight of the game, and offered advantages compared to other turn-based role-playing games. Others felt combat was too linear and expressed difficulty in managing combat sequences. Steven Butts of IGN praised the real-time combat as an "exciting change" and "lets you feel as if you're fighting a real battle". However, some critics disliked the omission of an experience system, with Barry Brenseal of GamePro felt the simplified mechanics made stats "strictly perfunctory", as players have no involvement in raising their stats. Some critics lamented the omission of quality-of-life features. The save system was critiqued due to being unable to save the game at any time. The mapping system also received criticism, with some reviewers finding it difficult to navigate or find exits, with Greg Orlando of Official Dreamcast Magazine stating the game's panoramic view often was "accompanied by little or no indication of where to go or what to do", requiring players to hunt for exits. Butts stated the combat system also carried an "impressive set of disadvantages", including issues with selecting and controlling multiple characters in real-time.

Critics had mixed views on the game's visuals, with some considering the visuals and environments to be above average, and others writing that the characters lacked detail compared to the environments. Butts stated the environments were "some of the best ever seen" due to their "sharp" details. Next Generation wrote that the game's pared-back camera allowed for "stunning views of the environments" but significantly affected gameplay and character detail. The audio and soundtrack of Silver were praised. Critics generally enjoyed the game's voice acting, with GamePro praising them as "professionally done and excellent", and commending the use of full voice-over dialog to remove the need for "endless text reading" found in similar games. Reception of the game's narrative was mixed; some found the story was compelling, although others remarked it was prone to cliche, or overly long. GameSpy commended the game's "depth of story" and character-driven narrative as making the game stand out. Anoop Gantayat of IGN felt the story was not "deep enough to evoke serious thought", stating sequences gave "minimal amount of direction" and it was "difficult to care for the characters".

The Dreamcast version of Silver received mixed reviews. Game Informer commended the game as the best of the few role-playing titles for the platform and "the first RPG for Dreamcast that I've felt like finishing". In contrast, Gantayat stated that the port of the game felt "rushed", citing the navigability of the game's interface as "too difficult" for the console's controls. Orlando similarly remarked the game's design was "odd" as it was a computer game "based around console-type game features and characters, which has then be ported to a console".

=== Accolades ===
At the 2000 3rd Annual Interactive Achievement Awards held by the Academy of Interactive Arts & Sciences, Silver was nominated for the D.I.C.E. Award for Outstanding Achievement in Original Music Composition. GameSpot also nominated Silver for a Special Achievement Award in the category of Best Music in 1999.

=== Retrospective reception ===
Samuel Horti of Rock Paper Shotgun retrospectively praised the swordplay as a "standout feature" of Silver, recalling that "the story is decent and the characters you meet have some excellent dialogue". Similarly, Ben Griffin of PC Gamer praised the "great characters and innovative controls", remarking that the gesture-based controls were a unique and memorable feature of the game. Griffin questioned why the feature "never caught on", and speculated that the game was better than, but overlooked against its contemporaries, including Final Fantasy VIII, Suikoden II, Baldur's Gate II, and Diablo II.
