= Studio e.go! =

Japanese video game company

- Type: Kabushiki gaisha
- Industry: Video games
- Founded: 1998
- Founder: Kazue Yamamoto
- Headquarters: Osaka, Japan
- Area served: Japan
- Key people: Kazue Yamamoto
- Products: Bishōjo games
- Website: www.studio-ego.jp

Studio e.go! was a Japanese eroge company which used to produce fantasy games of various genres for computers, including role-playing video games, SRPGs, and visual novels. The cutscenes of these games were illustrated by Kazue Yamamoto.

Some products were officially translated to Traditional Chinese for distribution in Taiwan between 1999 and 2001. Since these games were being marketed for all ages in Taiwan, the erotic scenes inside the story were modified or deleted. Taiwan Symbio (信必優多媒體) was the official distributor of the Chinese versions.

On March 17, 2009, amidst preparations for the company's 10th anniversary celebrations, Kazue Yamamoto announced that she was leaving the company. This announcement was followed by the departure of all of the remaining staff two days later.

Kazue Yamamoto founded a new company called Debo no su seisakujo (でぼの巣製作所) The company uses a fat sparrow named "Debo" (でぼ, "plump") as its mascot.

== Game List ==
=== PC Games ===
Title	Japanese title	First release date	Genre
Castle Fantasia	キャッスルファンタジア	1998-05-22	RPG
Castle Fantasia: Seima Taisen	キャッスルファンタジア ～聖魔大戦～	1998-11-20	
Men at Work!	メンアットワーク！	1999-07-30	RPG
Pythian	PYTHIAN	1999-05-28	
Kurenai no Namida	紅涙	1999-12-27	RPG
Castle Fantasia: Erencia Wars	キャッスルファンタジア ～エレンシア戦記～	2000-04-21	RPG
Twin Way	Twin Way	2000-07-14	
Men at Work! 2: Welcome to Hunter Academy	メンアットワーク！2 ～ハンターアカデミーへようこそ～	2000-11-17	RPG
Aozameta Tsuki no Hikari	蒼ざめた月の光	2001-04-20	Visual novel
My Fair Angel	マイ・フェア・エンジェル	2001-07-27	Raising sim
Working Days	わーきんぐDAYS	2001-10-26	Visual novel
Izumo	IZUMO	2001-12-21	
Yuki no Tokeru koro ni...	雪のとける頃に...	2002-04-19	Visual novel
Wind of Ebenbourg	エーベンブルグの風	2002-07-26	Simulation game
TenAku: ANGEL and DEVIL	てんあく ANGEL and DEVIL	2002-10-25	Visual novel
Men at Work! 3: Hunter-tachi no Seishun	メンアットワーク！3 ～ハンター達の青春～	2002-12-27	
Natsu Kagura	夏神楽	2003-06-20	RPG
Angel's Feather		2003-04-25	
Gakupara!! Gakuen Paradise	がくパラ!!～GAKUEN PARADISE!!～	2003-10-24	Visual novel
Vagrants		2003-12-26	RPG
Maou no Musume-tachi	魔王の娘たち	2004-04-23	Simulation game
Izumo 2		2004-07-30	RPG
Kaze no Keishosha	風の継承者	2004-11-26	Tactical RPG
Hitogata Ruins	ひとがたルイン	2004-12-24	Action RPG
Oni Kagura	鬼神楽	2005-04-28	
Izumo Zero	IZUMO零（ゼロ）	2005-09-22	Tactical RPG
Debo no Subako	でぼの巣箱	2005-12-22	Fandisc
Angel's Feather: Kohaku no Hitomi	Angel's Feather -琥珀の瞳-	2005	
Amakagura	天神楽	2005-12-22	Shooter
Izumo 2: Gakuen Kyousoukyoku	IZUMO2 学園狂想曲	2006-04-28	
Men at Work! 4: Hunter-tachi yo Eien ni	メンアットワーク！4 ～ハンター達よ永遠に～	2006-09-01	RPG
Mi-ko-ko-n	み・こ・こ・ん	2006-10-27	Visual novel
Okaeshi Beast!	おかえしび～すと!!	2006-11-24	Visual novel
Aozora Magiccer!!	あおぞらマジカ！！	2006-12-22	Shooter
Trouble Days	とらぶるDAYS	2007-04-20	Visual novel
Izumo 3	IZUMO3	2007-07-27	RPG
X-vain	エクスヴァイン	2007-10-26	
Tsuki Kagura	月神楽	2007-12-21	
Little Piece Vol.1	りとる・ピース vol.1	2008-03-28	
Little Piece Vol.2	りとる・ピース vol.2	2008-05-30	Visual novel
Eternal Kingdom: Horobi no Majo to Densetsu no Ken	ETERNAL KINGDOM～滅びの魔女と伝説の剣～	2008-07-25	Action RPG
Injoku no Seiki: Kaikan ni Ochita Hime	淫辱の性姫～快姦二堕チタ姫～	2008-10-31	
Toki no Senka	トキノ戦華	2009-01-23	Real-time strategy
Izumo 4	IZUMO4	2015-12-25	RPG
Meguru Sekai de Towanaru Chikai o!	廻るセカイで永遠なるチカイを！	2016-12-22	RPG

=== PS2 Games ===
Title	Japanese title	Release date	Genre
Castle Fantasia: Erencia Wars
IZUMO Complete
Men at Work! 3: Ai to Seishun no Hunter Gakuen
Izumo 2: Takeki Tsurugi no Senki
Castle Fantasia: Arihato Senki(Made from the original Game of Debo's no Subako)	キャッスルファンタジア アリハト戦記	2007-08-09	RPG
IZUMO 2: Gakuen Kyousoukyoku Double Tact
IZUMO Zero: Yokohama Ayakashi Emaki
Angel's Feather: Kohaku no Hitomi
Angel's Feather: Kuro no Zanei

=== Dreamcast Games ===
On (unknown date, date needed) a "Coming Soon" message was put up on the Company's Website announcing that the company was going to release some games for Dreamcast in the near future. Although three games were supposed to be released as per the initial announcement, only 2 were released, both on 22 January 2004.

- Castle Fantasia: Seima Taisen
- Izumo

== Adaption of Games into other Media ==
Most of the Company's games were adapted into an anime series or OVA, though some of them were never licensed.

In Order of Release they are:

- Izumo The Best: Complete Edition (Aired on TV Between 25 January 2003 to 25 October 2004. Two years later, on 25 January 2005, Izumo - The Complete Edition was released )
- Castle Fantasia: Seima Taisen (Aired on TV Between 25 January 2003 to 25 October 2004)
- Wind of Ebenbourg
- Izumo: Takeki Tsurugi no Senki (Aired on TV Between 3 April 2005 to 19 June 2005)
- Angel's Feather

== Other Products ==
The merchandise, released by the company as supplements to their games, is very varied, ranging from their own OST games (Most of these were composed by Angel Note and the Openings and Endings of some these Games were performed (and in some cases, written) by Candy) to Artbooks and Fanbooks of the games.

Some of these fanbooks were produced for and published by other companies, and in most of the cases, not for Studio e.go itself.

== Sub-Companies ==
There were two sub-companies of Studio E.go!, one of them was Blue Impact, a Boy's Love (BL) Game producer and publisher, which made Angel's Feather, which is still producing White Shadow, and which was the publisher of Working Days in 2001.

Some of its releases were:

- White Shadow
- Angel's Feather~Mono Hot Springs~(Tentative)
- Angel's Feather -Kuro no Zanei- (The PS2 Version of The Original Game. Rated 15+)
- Angel's Feather -Kohaku no Hitomi- (This was the 18+ Version of the Original Angel's Feather)
- Angel's Feather (This release was rated 15+)

The other sub-branch of the company is Cool Beans (KU-RUBI-NZU) 「くーるびーんず] which is the developer and publisher of the OSTs and CD Dramas of Studio E.go! and Blue Impact Games, a subdivision of the original company.

Some of its releases were:

- Kagura Souenshu (神楽奏演集)
- Amakagura & Jankagura Original SoundTrack(天神楽・雀神楽 オリジナルサウンドトラック)
- Studio E.go! Vocal Collection Vol.1
- Studio E.go! Vocal Collection Vol.2
- Men at Work! 1~4 Complete Soundtrack Collection (オリジナルサウンドトラック 「メンアットワーク！」1～4 コンプリート！)
- Izumo 2 Original Soundtrack Collection CD Complete Box (Izumo 2 猛き剣の閃記 キャラクターソング＆ドラマCD Complete Box)

== Other releases ==
These were published before the release of IZUMO 2 Original Soundtrack Collection CD:COMPLETE BOX.

- IZUMO2 猛き剣の閃記 キャラクターソング＆ドラマCD vol.4
- IZUMO2 猛き剣の閃記 キャラクターソング＆ドラマCD vol.3
- IZUMO2 猛き剣の閃記 キャラクターソング＆ドラマCD vol.2
- IZUMO2 猛き剣の閃記 キャラクターソング＆ドラマCD vol.1
- IZUMO & IZUMO 2 Original Soundtrack
