= TechnoMage =

2001 video game

Technomage
- Cover art
- Developer: Sunflowers
- Publisher: Sunflowers
- Platforms: PlayStation, Windows
- Release: EU: June 29, 2001
- Genre: Role-playing video game
- Mode: Single-player

TechnoMage (also called TechnoMage: Return of Eternity, German: TechnoMage: Die Rückkehr der Ewigkeit) is a video game released by German game developer Sunflowers. Technomage was only ever released in PAL territories.

It appeared on November 24, 2000, for Windows and on June 29, 2001, for the PlayStation. It was the last own production of the company; in 2002 the internal development department was dissolved.

== Storyline ==
The player character, Melvin, must save the world of Gothos from destruction. The people of Gothos are split into two types, the magic using Dreamers, and the technological Steamers. Melvin is half Dreamer, half Steamer. Melvin starts in his hometown of Dreamertown, when it is attacked by monsters. He is blamed, and taken to trial to be exiled. His uncle then teaches him the "basics", pending Melvin's exile. This section serves as the tutorial stage. After this Melvin leaves Dreamertown and heads to Steamertown, on his adventure to find his father.

After passing Steamertown, Melvin enters a huge underground labyrinth called "The Hive", where his father vanished during an expedition. The Hive is a vast network built by the former rulers of Gothos. It contains grave complexes, libraries and laboratories; Melvin finds the first crystal of eternity there. When he leaves the Hive, he steps into the Great Forest, the realm of the fairies. They suffer from goblin uproars which are stopped by Melvin who then joins a pair of Shach traders on their journey to the canyon. Here, Melvin encounters Dagomar for the first time, the last survivor of the former rulers of Gothos. He acts as Melvin's mentor and guide. Also, Melvin befriends Talis, a girl who lives in exile because she also is half Dreamer, half Steamer.

After clearing the canyon's mines, they travel to the tower, the former rulers' fortress of knowledge, which is now haunted by an undead dragon. As Melvin kills the dragon, another dragon is freed who takes Melvin to the volcano, which is where the Shach traders live. In the deeper levels of the volcano's caves, Melvin discovers more artifacts and buildings from the former rulers, as well as a map which leads him, Talis and the dragon to the ancient ruins of the former capital of Gothos. Here, Dagomar drops his disguise and Melvin has to find out that Dagomar is Ramogad, the traitor who led to the downfall of the former rulers. After a big fight against Ramogad, Melvin uses the crystals of eternity found in the different regions of Gothos to reactivate both a stasis trap to stop Ramogad and a barrier device which uses a magic liquid to shield Gothos from the demon realms below. Talis then helps Melvin to escape the collapsing ruins and they fly across the ocean towards the sun.
