= El Dorado Gate =

- Japanese Dreamcast cover arts from Volumes 1 through 7
- Developer: Capcom
- Publisher: Capcom
- Designer: Yoshinori Takenaka
- Artist: Yoshitaka Amano
- Platform: Dreamcast
- Release: Volume 1: JP: October 10, 2000; Volume 2: JP: December 12, 2000; Volume 3: JP: February 2, 2001; Volume 4: JP: April 12, 2001; Volume 5: JP: June 6, 2001; Volume 6: JP: August 8, 2001; Volume 7: JP: October 10, 2001
- Genre: Role-playing
- Mode: Single-player

El Dorado Gate (エルドラドゲートシリーズ) is a series of role-playing video games for the Dreamcast, released in Japan. Its seven volumes were released on a bi-monthly basis in Japan from October 10, 2000, through October 10, 2001.

== Story ==
The story involves twelve characters, each of whom must overcome personal quests on their way to finding the other eleven while aided by a mysterious man named Bantross. Relying heavily on elemental weapons, equipment, and magic spells, the game features many common RPG elements such as dungeon-exploring, weapon-upgrading, and turn-based battles. After surmounting their personal battles the twelve heroes first face the terrible Bals, Dios' most powerful servant and then descend into the underworld to face Dios and resurrect Razin.

== Reception ==
IGN gave volume 1 a 7.9 score.

Gamespot gave volume 1 a score of 6.7.

Three reviewers for Famitsu DC reviewed volume 5, giving it scores of 7/7/7, for a total of 21 out of 30.
