= Spiral House =

- בית הספירלה
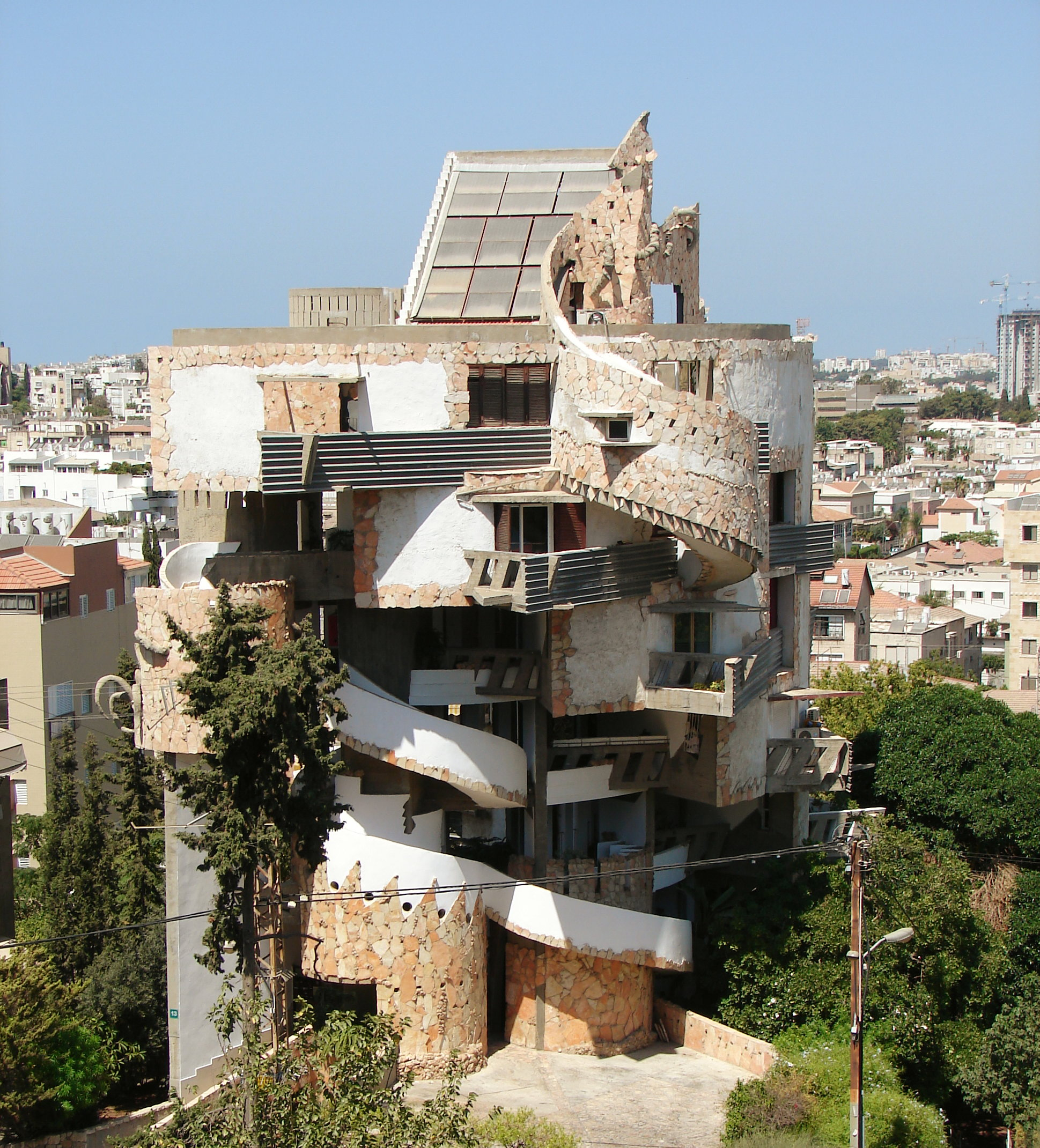
- Interactive map of the Spiral House area

General information
- Status: Completed
- Type: Apartments
- Location: Ramat Gan, Israel
- Coordinates: 32°04′42″N 34°49′16″E
- Construction started: 1984
- Opening: 1990
- Owner: Ezra Mualem

Design and construction
- Architect: Zvi Hecker
- Other designers: Gil Bernstein, Shmuel Groberman, Rina Hering

The Spiral House (Hebrew: בית הספירלה, Beit HaSpirala) is an apartment complex in Ramat Gan, Israel, designed by the architect Zvi Hecker.

The complex has a form of an upward spiral; it was built by Jaakov Hai and designed by the architect Zvi Hecker in collaboration with Gil Bernstein, Shmuel Groberman, and Rina Hering. The owner is Ezra Mualem. The house "deploys the principle of terracing typical of Arab villages where the roof is used as part of the living space for the apartments".

Construction took place from 1984 to 1990. Hecker himself lived in the Dubiner house which is opposite the Spiral House. During the construction, he therefore kept an explicit control and changed the design several times during construction. The building was built in concrete, "with a facade of plaster, pink glass and stone fragments and corrugated tin."

Hecker described the building as a "miniature Tower of Babel"; Shmuel Grobstein, who participated in the design, said that it "looks like a storm passed through Ramat Gan, picking up all the wrecks from the roofs and yards, and created the spiral in one swoop."

Hecker won the Rechter Prize for architecture in 1999 for the Spiral House.

Hecker's daughter, Ella Zimmerman, lives in the Spiral House with her family.
