= Mango Plumo =

Series of educational video game

- Genre: Edutainment
- Developer: Quebec Amerique
- Publisher: QA International
- Creators: François Fortin, Caroline Fortin
- Artist: Anouk Noël
- Platforms: Windows, Macintosh
- First release: Mango Plumo: Weather Adventure; 2001
- Latest release: Mango Plumo: Earth Adventure; 2003

Mango Plumo (also known as Mango Plumo's Nature and Science Series) is an educational interactive video game collection developed by Canadian company Quebec Amerique and published by QA International, in collaboration with Quebec-based software commercialisation company Druide informatique. There are three titles in the series: Mango Plumo's Earth Adventure, Mango Plumo's Space Adventure, and Mango Plumo's Weather Adventure. The titles feature a bird named Mango who lives in a magical world. Mango must work to stop the plans of the evil sorcerer Hocus Pocus. The games are available in French, and were later translated to Italian and English.

== Gameplay ==
The games consist of a series of screens that contain various hotspots that can be clicked on to advance the story. They combines computer animation with traditional animation. Each game contains six interactive games and three levels of difficulty.

== Plot and characters ==
In Mango Plumo, the player assists the protagonist, a bird named Mango, to restore the faults caused by the antagonist, the evil sorcerer Hocus Pocus, by making scientific discoveries taught by Professor Funnybone. Mango Plumo's first adventure Mango Plumo's Weather Adventure sees him discover meteorological phenomena on his journey. Next, in Mango Plumo's Space Adventure Mango travels into space to embark on a quest that sees him discover information about planets and stars along the way. Some time after Mango returns from his Space adventure, his Family is awoken by an earthquake. In Mango Plumo's Earth Adventure Mango hops towards Professor Funnybones house and asks what is happening. Professor Funnybone explains that Hocus Pocus has returned and has stolen the six wonders of the Earth and locked them in chests inside his castle. The player assists mango in his adventure to find the keys to the chests and restore the six wonders, and to undo the damage Hocus Pocus has caused.

== Development ==
The games were created as the debut video game works for publishing house Québec Amérique. The company anticipated in 2000, before production had begun, that the skills learnt during the formative first two titles would allow for a more streamlined production for Explores the Earth, which would only require a quarter of the time to make than the first, Explores the Weather. Québec Amérique anticipated that development of the series would take three years in total, and that the games would be a "great success" in the United States, Latin America, Russia and France, where the CD-ROMs would be distributed. Illustrations were designed by Anouk Noël, while the dialogues were written by author Gilles Tibo. Tibo wrote tie-in books to accompany each game – as the player progressed, the events would be recorded in the Flight Logbook or Activity Log in the form of a storybook. Players could read the story, colour in the images, and print them out. Each game included a preface by Gérard Mordillat. Singer-songwriter Luc de Larochellière wrote two original songs for each title that ran in-game. The songs could be played by inserting the game discs into a CD player. Activity sheets were also provided with each game to supplement the resources found in the game and reinforce the subjects taught. For Explores the Weather, the developers collaborated with Radio-Canada meteorologist Ève Christian. Two titles were packaged with the Geosafari games Geosafari Knowledge Pad Math: Multiplication & Division and GeoSafari Knowledge Pad Math: Fractions, Decimals, and Percentages into a bundle entitled Math & Science Excelerator Grades 3-6, which contained the World Book encyclopedia as an add-on. In 2002, Explores the Weather and Explores the Space were both reissued with new covers displaying the awards they had won. Mango Plumo was presented at the Milia Trade Show 2002 held in Cannes, France. Lien Multimedia noted that since QA International had global partners and distribution across five continents, its annual visit to the tradeshow with this gaming project was one that "goes without saying".

== Reception ==
Reception

Review scores
| Publication | Score |
|---|---|
| PCWorld España | 5/5 (5/5); Weather |
| The Washington Times | 5/5 (5/5); Weather |
| Discovery Education | 4/5 (8.2/10); Weather |
| PC Mag | 4/5 (4/5); Weather |
| EducaMadrid | 3/5 (3/5); Weather |
| EducaMadrid | 3/5 (3/5); Space |
| Planète Québec | 2.5/5 (5/10); Space |
| Infinit | 4/5 (8/10); Earth |
| Planète Québec | 2.5/5 (5/10); Earth |

Awards
| Publication | Award |
|---|---|
| Octas 2001; Weather | Multimedia – General public |
| Golden MIM 2001; Space | Best Edutainment |

Telefilm Canada thought the series was a piece of "innovative" Canadian digital media throughout the 2000–2009 decade. In their 2002–2003 annual report, Telefilm Canada noted that "many thousands of units" of Mango Plumo's Earth Adventure had sold in Quebec and abroad.

=== Weather Adventure ===
Discovery Education thought the "charming" and "fantastic" title achieved its educational and entertainment goals despite having a slightly slow and confusing interface. The site thought the adventure game puzzles of Explores the Space and Explores the Weather were difficult, but that the science lessons were "highly original", additionally praising the titles for their "gorgeous graphics" and "stylish songs". Piedad Bullón of PCWorld España thought that the success of the didactic game revolved around its ability to provide clear and enjoyable explanations of weather phenomena, thereby fully immersing the player and asking them to apply scientific concepts in a real world context. Additionally, Bullón commented on the "very funny" protagonist Mango Plumo, as well as the "compendium" of content which has been designed to enhance logical development and creativity. Jean-Marc Tremblay of Infinit praised the richness of the game's colour scheme, and the educational nature of the title which answered many weather-related questions young people have, deeming it the perfect Christmas gift for a curious child. PC Mag's Nancy Hirsch thought the game's sense of fun would outweigh any difficulty players had with navigation through the screens, ultimately giving it an "Excellent" rating. Denise A. Garofalo of School Library Journal thought the game offered a great introduction to scientific concepts and was best used as a supplement to the traditional teaching materials in the classroom. The Washington Times' Joseph Szadkowski praised the game's ability to stimulate the player's brain in an age of FPS where the player's thumb-index finger dexterity were more often tested, ultimately deeming it both "well-rounded" and "clever". Szadkowski positively compared the game to Zook Discovers the Seasons commenting that the latter game looked "dated", "formula-driven", and unremarkable when compared to the former, noting that a draw for Mango Plumo was its licensed main character. The game was recommended by Dr. Nadia Gagnier in La Presse as a tool to help a nervous child understand how the weather works. The National Parenting Center thought the title was a "combination of the finest elements found in the top children’s software today", particularly praising the seamlessness and integration of its educational content. The World Meteorological Organization thought the title explained meteorological concepts in an "educative, sound and very playful manner". The school Plein Soleil in Hérouxville used the software to get the information needed to build a barometer for their in-class science activities. Commission scolaire des Affluents thought the title contained beautiful animation that illustrated weather phenomena well.

=== Space Adventure ===
Adrienne Robillard of Macworld praised the game's animation and its "clever" injection of science into the gameplay; however she noted the steep learning curve that will cause some players to refer to the game booklet for advice. Louise Turgeon of Planète Québec thought the game was a surprising and amusing "popularisation" of astronomy. Edutaining Kids thought Explores the Space and Explores the Weather were both creative and unique with respect to how they taught science. The National Parenting Center complimented the game for its "delightful" characters, "strong" animation and "nicely woven" plotline, ultimately deeming it a "winner". Chantal Srivastava of Les Années lumière deemed the program "fascinating" and praised it for its multimedia elements.

=== Earth Adventure ===
Planète Québec's Louise Turgeon praised the game's explanations of scientific concepts as both simple and humorous. Diane S. Kendall of Power To Learn praised the title's fun and fascinating exploratory design, which not only tested players' "coordination and motor skills", but also their "imaginations, logic and inquiry skills".

== Awards and nominations ==
| Year | Nominee / work | Award | Result |
|---|---|---|---|
| June 2001 | Weather Adventure | Octas award for Best Multimedia – General consumer public (awarded by the Fédération de l'informatique du Québec) | Won |
| 2001 | Weather Adventure | National Parenting Center Seal of Approval | Won |
| 12 November 2001 | Space Adventure | Winner of Golden MIM in Edutainment and Fine Game category | Won |
| 16 April 2003 | Earth Adventure | Winner of Golden MIM award for Best Multimedia and Edutainment Product | Won |
| May 2003 | Earth Adventure | Octas award for Best Multimedia – Games and Edutainment | Won |
| Fall 2003 | Space Adventure | The National Parenting Center Seal of Approval Winner | Won |
