= List of BioWare video games =

BioWare was a Canadian video game developer based in Edmonton, Alberta. It was founded in 1994 by Ray Muzyka, Greg Zeschuk, and Augustine Yip. They signed a partnership with American publisher Interplay Productions to get investment and development resources for their first game Shattered Steel, a mech simulation action game released in 1996. The game was a modest success, but BioWare's second title, Baldur's Gate (1998), achieved overwhelming critical praise and defined the company's future direction. A role-playing video game (RPG) based on Dungeons & Dragons, Baldur's Gate sold more than two million copies and became the most successful Dungeons & Dragons game ever at the time. Two years later, the studio released an acclaimed sequel Baldur's Gate II: Shadows of Amn, which along with the use of BioWare game engines in RPGs such as Planescape: Torment (1999) and Icewind Dale (2000) helped propel the studio to the forefront of the computer RPG genre. Interplay was suffering financially by the early 2000s, so BioWare collaborated with publisher Infogrames to release their next Dungeons & Dragon-based RPG Neverwinter Nights (2002).

BioWare was given the opportunity to work on another popular intellectual property, Star Wars, when LucasArts approached them at the turn of the millennium. Star Wars: Knights of the Old Republic released first on Microsoft's Xbox video game console in 2003. While it was not BioWare's first console game, it helped the studio break into the console market since Microsoft Game Studios wanted to partner with them on console exclusive titles, such as Jade Empire (2005) and Mass Effect (2007). In March 2006, BioWare expanded their operations and opened a new studio in Austin, Texas, to helm the development of a massively multiplayer online role-playing game (MMORPG). In October 2007, American publisher Electronic Arts (EA) announced that it had acquired BioWare. Under EA, BioWare established the fantasy RPG series Dragon Age, continued to release games in their science fiction RPG series Mass Effect, and opened a new studio in Montreal. They also revisited the Star Wars franchise with BioWare Austin's MMORPG Star Wars: The Old Republic (2011).

In the early 2010s, EA restructured and rebranded several of its other studios under the BioWare label, including Mythic Entertainment and Victory Games which respectively became BioWare Mythic and BioWare Victory. New games from these studios were announced as BioWare projects, but they were cancelled and the studios shut down in the following years. In September 2012, co-founders Muzyka and Zeschuk announced their retirement and departure from BioWare. Following the release of Mass Effect: Andromeda in 2017, BioWare Montreal was merged with EA's Motive Studios. BioWare was closed as a studio in October 2026 with its existing projects cancelled a few months after EA was bought by Saudi Arabia's Public Investment Fund.

== Games ==
All games developed by BioWare Edmonton, except where noted.

Game	Details
Shattered Steel Original release dates: NA: 27 September 1996; EU: September 1996	Release years by system: 1996 – DOS, Windows; 1997 – Mac OS
Shattered Steel Original release dates: NA: 27 September 1996; EU: September 1996	Notes: Mech simulation action game; Originally published by Interplay Productions
Baldur's Gate Original release dates: NA: 21 December 1998; EU: December 1998; AU: Q1 1999; JP: 30 January 1999	Release years by system: 1998 – Windows; 2000 – Mac OS
Baldur's Gate Original release dates: NA: 21 December 1998; EU: December 1998; AU: Q1 1999; JP: 30 January 1999	Notes: Fantasy role-playing game; Set in the Forgotten Realms campaign setting of Dungeons & Dragons; Based on Advanced Dungeons & Dragons 2nd edition ruleset; Originally published by Interplay Entertainment; Tales of the Sword Coast expansion released in May 1999; Enhanced Edition developed by Overhaul Games/Beamdog and released in 2012
MDK2 Original release dates: NA: 31 March 2000; EU: 12 May 2000	Release years by system: 2000 – Dreamcast, Windows; 2001 – PlayStation 2; 2011 – Wii
MDK2 Original release dates: NA: 31 March 2000; EU: 12 May 2000	Notes: Science fiction action-adventure game; Originally published by Interplay Entertainment; PlayStation 2 version received enhancements and was renamed to MDK 2: Armageddon; Wii release and MDK2 HD developed by Overhaul Games/Beamdog
Baldur's Gate II: Shadows of Amn Original release dates: NA: 21 September 2000; AU: 28 September 2000; EU: 29 September 2000; JP: 11 October 2000	Release years by system: 2000 – Windows; 2001 – Mac OS
Baldur's Gate II: Shadows of Amn Original release dates: NA: 21 September 2000; AU: 28 September 2000; EU: 29 September 2000; JP: 11 October 2000	Notes: Fantasy role-playing game; Set in the Forgotten Realms campaign setting of Dungeons & Dragons; Based on Advanced Dungeons & Dragons 2nd edition ruleset; Originally published by Interplay Entertainment; Throne of Bhaal expansion released in June 2001; Enhanced Edition developed by Overhaul Games/Beamdog and released in 2013
Neverwinter Nights Original release dates: NA: 18 June 2002; EU: 28 June 2002; AU: 3 July 2002; JP: 20 March 2003	Release years by system: 2002 – Windows; 2003 – Linux, Mac OS X
Neverwinter Nights Original release dates: NA: 18 June 2002; EU: 28 June 2002; AU: 3 July 2002; JP: 20 March 2003	Notes: Fantasy role-playing game; Set in the Forgotten Realms campaign setting of Dungeons & Dragons; Based on Dungeons & Dragons 3rd edition ruleset; Originally published by Infogrames; Shadows of Undrentide expansion released in June 2003; co-developed with Floodgate Entertainment; Hordes of the Underdark expansion released in December 2003; Additional downloadable content released following the expansions; Enhanced Edition developed by Beamdog
Star Wars: Knights of the Old Republic Original release dates: NA: 16 July 2003; EU: 12 September 2003; AU: 19 September 2003	Release years by system: 2003 – Xbox, Windows; 2004 – Mac OS X; 2013 – iOS; 2014 – Android
Star Wars: Knights of the Old Republic Original release dates: NA: 16 July 2003; EU: 12 September 2003; AU: 19 September 2003	Notes: Role-playing game; Set in the Star Wars universe; Originally published by LucasArts and Microsoft Game Studios
Jade Empire Original release dates: NA: 12 April 2005; EU: 22 April 2005; AU: 19 May 2005; JP: 16 June 2005	Release years by system: 2005 – Xbox; 2007 – Windows; 2008 – Mac OS X; 2016 – iOS, Android
Jade Empire Original release dates: NA: 12 April 2005; EU: 22 April 2005; AU: 19 May 2005; JP: 16 June 2005	Notes: Role-playing game; Inspired by Chinese mythology and martial arts; Originally published by Microsoft Game Studios
Mass Effect Original release dates: NA: 20 November 2007; AU: 22 November 2007; EU: 23 November 2007; JP: 21 May 2009	Release years by system: 2007 – Xbox 360; 2008 – Windows; 2012 – PlayStation 3
Mass Effect Original release dates: NA: 20 November 2007; AU: 22 November 2007; EU: 23 November 2007; JP: 21 May 2009	Notes: Science fiction action role-playing game; Originally published by Microsoft Game Studios; Downloadable content released following launch
Sonic Chronicles: The Dark Brotherhood Original release dates: AU: 25 September 2008; EU: 26 September 2008; NA: 30 September 2008; JP: 6 August 2009	Release years by system: 2008 – Nintendo DS
Sonic Chronicles: The Dark Brotherhood Original release dates: AU: 25 September 2008; EU: 26 September 2008; NA: 30 September 2008; JP: 6 August 2009	Notes: Role-playing game; Set in the Sonic the Hedgehog universe; Published by Sega
Mass Effect Galaxy Original release date: WW: 22 June 2009	Release years by system: 2009 – iOS
Mass Effect Galaxy Original release date: WW: 22 June 2009	Notes: Top-down action game; Published by Microsoft Game Studios
Dragon Age: Origins Original release dates: NA: 3 November 2009; AU: 5 November 2009; EU: 6 November 2009; JP: 27 January 2011	Release years by system: 2009 – Mac OS X, PlayStation 3, Windows, Xbox 360
Dragon Age: Origins Original release dates: NA: 3 November 2009; AU: 5 November 2009; EU: 6 November 2009; JP: 27 January 2011	Notes: Fantasy role-playing game; Published by Electronic Arts; Downloadable content released following launch; Awakening expansion released in March 2010
Mass Effect 2 Original release dates: NA: 26 January 2010; AU: 28 January 2010; EU: 29 January 2010; JP: 13 January 2011	Release years by system: 2010 – Windows, Xbox 360; 2011 – PlayStation 3
Mass Effect 2 Original release dates: NA: 26 January 2010; AU: 28 January 2010; EU: 29 January 2010; JP: 13 January 2011	Notes: Science fiction action role-playing game; Originally published by Electronic Arts and Microsoft Game Studios; Downloadable content released following launch
Dragon Age II Original release dates: NA: 8 March 2011; AU: 10 March 2011; EU: 11 March 2011; JP: 2 February 2012	Release years by system: 2011 – Mac OS X, PlayStation 3, Windows, Xbox 360
Dragon Age II Original release dates: NA: 8 March 2011; AU: 10 March 2011; EU: 11 March 2011; JP: 2 February 2012	Notes: Fantasy action role-playing game; Published by Electronic Arts; Downloadable content released following launch
Dragon Age Legends Original release date: WW: 16 March 2011	Release years by system: 2011 – Facebook and Google+
Dragon Age Legends Original release date: WW: 16 March 2011	Notes: Social network tactical role-playing game browser game; Developed by EA2D, later restructured as BioWare San Francisco
Star Wars: The Old Republic Original release dates: NA: 20 December 2011; EU: 20 December 2011; AU: 1 March 2012; AS: 1 March 2012	Release years by system: 2011 – Windows
Star Wars: The Old Republic Original release dates: NA: 20 December 2011; EU: 20 December 2011; AU: 1 March 2012; AS: 1 March 2012	Notes: Massively multiplayer online role-playing game; Set in the Star Wars universe; Developed by BioWare Austin; Published by Electronic Arts; Seven expansions released following launch
Mass Effect 3 Original release dates: NA: 6 March 2012; AU: 8 March 2012; EU: 9 March 2012; JP: 15 March 2012	Release years by system: 2012 – PlayStation 3, Wii U, Windows, Xbox 360
Mass Effect 3 Original release dates: NA: 6 March 2012; AU: 8 March 2012; EU: 9 March 2012; JP: 15 March 2012	Notes: Science fiction action role-playing game; Published by Electronic Arts; Downloadable content released following launch
Warhammer Online: Wrath of Heroes Cancellation date: 29 March 2013	Proposed system release: Windows
Warhammer Online: Wrath of Heroes Cancellation date: 29 March 2013	Notes: Free-to-play multiplayer online battle arena game; Set in the Warhammer Fantasy universe; Developed by BioWare Mythic; Planned to be published by Electronic Arts; Open beta released in 2011
Command & Conquer: Generals 2 Cancellation date: 29 October 2013	Proposed system release: Windows
Command & Conquer: Generals 2 Cancellation date: 29 October 2013	Notes: During development, project design shifted from a standard real-time strategy game (RTS) to a free-to-play, multiplayer-focused RTS rebranded as Command & Conquer; Set in the Command & Conquer universe; Developed by BioWare Victory; Planned to be published by Electronic Arts
Dragon Age: Inquisition Original release dates: NA: 18 November 2014; AU: 20 November 2014; EU: 21 November 2014; JP: 27 November 2014	Release years by system: 2014 – PlayStation 3, PlayStation 4, Windows, Xbox 360, Xbox One
Dragon Age: Inquisition Original release dates: NA: 18 November 2014; AU: 20 November 2014; EU: 21 November 2014; JP: 27 November 2014	Notes: Fantasy action role-playing game; Published by Electronic Arts; Downloadable content released following launch
Shadow Realms Cancellation date: 9 February 2015	Proposed system release: 2017 – PlayStation 4, Windows, Xbox One
Shadow Realms Cancellation date: 9 February 2015	Notes: Asymmetrical multiplayer action role-playing game; Developed by BioWare Austin; Planned to be published by Electronic Arts
Mass Effect: Andromeda Original release dates: NA: 21 March 2017; EU: 23 March 2017; AU: 23 March 2017	Release years by system: 2017 – PlayStation 4, Windows, Xbox One
Mass Effect: Andromeda Original release dates: NA: 21 March 2017; EU: 23 March 2017; AU: 23 March 2017	Notes: Science fiction action role-playing game; Developed by BioWare Montreal; Published by Electronic Arts
Anthem Original release date(s): WW: 22 February 2019	Release years by system: 2019 – PlayStation 4, Windows, Xbox One
Anthem Original release date(s): WW: 22 February 2019	Notes: Science fiction action role-playing game; Published by Electronic Arts
Mass Effect Legendary Edition Original release date(s): WW: 14 May 2021	Release years by system: 2021 – PlayStation 4, Windows, Xbox One
Mass Effect Legendary Edition Original release date(s): WW: 14 May 2021	Notes: Remastered version of the original Mass Effect trilogy; Published by Electronic Arts
Dragon Age: The Veilguard Original release date(s): WW: 31 October 2024	Release years by system: 2024 - PlayStation 5, Windows, Xbox Series X/S
Dragon Age: The Veilguard Original release date(s): WW: 31 October 2024	Notes: Fantasy action role-playing game; Published by Electronic Arts
Mass Effect: Universe Cancellation date: 21 October 2026	Proposed system release: Unknown
Mass Effect: Universe Cancellation date: 21 October 2026	Notes: Announced in December 2020; Planned to be published by Electronic Arts
