= Ray Muzyka =

Canadian investor, entrepreneur and physician

Ray Muzyka CM
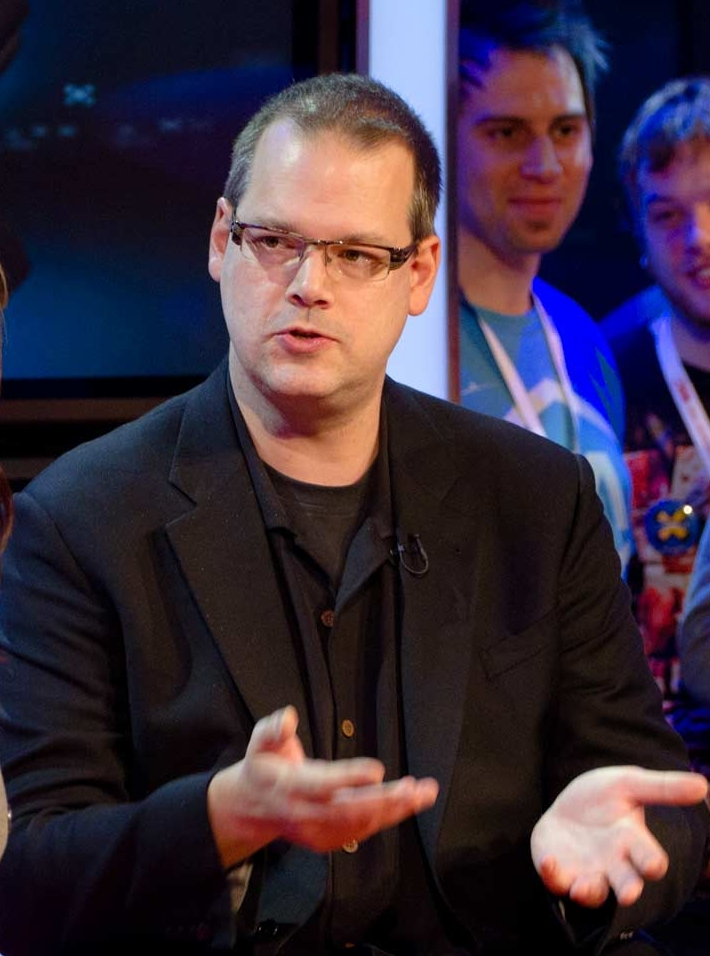
- Muzyka at interview by G4TV at E3 2011
- Born: Raymond Alexander Muzyka; Edmonton, Alberta, Canada
- Other name: Raymond Muzyka
- Known for: Founder of BioWare
- Awards: AIAS Hall of Fame Award (2011)

Raymond Alexander Muzyka CM is a Canadian investor, entrepreneur and physician. Originally trained as a medical doctor and practicing as an emergency department and family physician after graduation, he is the co-founder of video game developer BioWare, and was CEO, senior vice president, and general manager of the BioWare label of Electronic Arts. In October 2012 he announced that he was embarking on a 'third career' mentoring and angel investing in technology, new media, medical and social entrepreneurs, and impact investing at ThresholdImpact.

== Career ==
Muzyka co-founded BioWare, which was incorporated in 1995, with Greg Zeschuk and Augustine Yip, in the early 1990s after they earned their medical degrees at the University of Alberta. After selling BioWare to Electronic Arts in 2008, Muzyka became a general manager and vice president at EA in addition to his CEO role at BioWare, and subsequently was promoted to senior vice president and general manager of the BioWare label at EA.

In addition to his project development role, Muzyka has also managed the financial, human resources, operations, marketing and legal business side of BioWare, and he completed his executive Masters in Business Administration (MBA) program in 2001 at the Ivey School of Business, UWO. He completed his Medical Doctorate (MD) in 1992 from the University of Alberta, and subsequently obtained his specialization from the Canadian College of Family Physicians (CCFP) in 1994. Muzyka was named as one of Canada's "Top 40 under 40" in 2001, received Ernst and Young's Entrepreneur of the Year award (Software and Information, Prairies) in 2001, and the BDC Young Entrepreneur of the Year award in 1997. Muzyka also graduated from Old Scona Academic High School in Edmonton, Alberta, Canada where he took the International Baccalaureate program, finishing fourth worldwide and first in North America the year he graduated. Muzyka was inducted into the Academy of Interactive Arts and Sciences' Hall of Fame in 2011., received the Lifetime Achievement award from the International Game Developers Choice Awards in 2013, and was named as the 2017 Allard Chair in Business at MacEwan University. He was named into the Alberta Business Hall of Fame in 2018. On December 27, 2018, Muzyka was appointed to the Order of Canada. In 2019 Muzyka received the Rod Charko Service Award from the Venture Capital Association of Alberta for his service to the startup entrepreneurial community in the province of Alberta.

Muzyka is an active member of the Young Presidents' Organization (YPO), and a Charter Member of the A100 since 2012. He has also served as the Founding Chair of the University of Alberta Venture Mentoring Service since fall 2013, a program intended to help develop, uplift and inspire University of Alberta student and alumni entrepreneurs by creating excellent mentorship experiences for both entrepreneurs and mentors. Muzyka served from 2014 to 2020 as a member of the University of Alberta Board of Governors, and as Chair of the Human Resources and Compensation Committee. He serves as a mentor in the Creative Destruction Lab (CDL West Prime and Health, CDL Rockies Prime, CDL Toronto Health). Muzyka was a board member of the Academy of Interactive Arts and Sciences from 2001 to 2008. He also served the Stollery Children's Hospital Foundation as a volunteer Director on their Board of Trustees from 2012 to late 2015.

In October 2012 Muzyka announced on the BioWare website that he was retiring from the video game industry and that he is moving on to a 'third career chapter', mentoring and investing in entrepreneurs in technology, new media, medical innovation, and social entrepreneurs and impact investing. He announced his new company, Threshold Impact, in early 2013, to be focused on "sustainable, profitable impact investing".

An avid poker player who plays in the WSOP and other events each year, Muzyka won the inaugural DICE poker tournament, in 2006 which featured a range of notable poker celebrities such as Scott Fischman, Chris Ferguson and Perry Friedman, playing heads-up with Mike Morhaime from Blizzard Entertainment at the final table. He also became the only player thus far to win the DICE tournament twice, when he chopped the final table with three other players for first place again in the 2010 DICE tournament. He competed in the 2008 WCPC CPT Main Event (Western Canadian Main Event, Canadian Poker Tour) and chopped the final table with the final four players to take home the 2008 WCPC ring. He finished 374th of 7319 players in the 2010 Main Event of the WSOP.

== BioWare projects credited with platforms and dates ==
- Shattered Steel (PC and Mac, 1996)
- Baldur's Gate (PC and Mac, 1998)
  - Baldur's Gate: Tales of the Sword Coast (PC and Mac, 1999)
- MDK2 (Dreamcast and PC, 2000)
- Baldur's Gate II: Shadows of Amn (PC and Mac, 2000)
  - Baldur's Gate II: Throne of Bhaal (PC and Mac, 2001)
- MDK2: Armageddon (PS2, 2001)
- Neverwinter Nights (PC and Mac, 2002)
  - Neverwinter Nights: Shadows of Undrentide (PC and Mac, 2003)
  - Neverwinter Nights: Hordes of the Underdark (PC and Mac, 2003)
  - Neverwinter Nights: Kingmaker (PC and Mac, 2005)
- Star Wars: Knights of the Old Republic ("KotOR") (Xbox and PC and Mac, 2003)
- Jade Empire (Xbox, 2005/PC, 2006)
- Mass Effect (Xbox 360, 2007/PC, 2008/PlayStation 3, 2012)
- Sonic Chronicles: The Dark Brotherhood (2008)
- Dragon Age: Origins (PC, Xbox 360, PlayStation 3 and Mac, 2009)
- Mass Effect 2 (Xbox 360, PC, 2010)(PlayStation 3, 2011)
- Dragon Age II (PC, Xbox 360, PlayStation 3, 2011)
- Star Wars: The Old Republic (PC, 2011)
- Mass Effect 3 (PC, Xbox 360, PlayStation 3, 2012)

== Awards and recognition ==
In 2009, he was chosen by IGN as one of the top 100 game creators of all time alongside BioWare co-founder Greg Zeschuk.

In 2011, the Academy of Interactive Arts & Sciences bestowed Muzyka (along with co-founder Greg Zeschuk) with the Academy's Hall of Fame award.

At the Game Developers Choice Awards, on March 27, 2013, Muzyka was awarded the Lifetime Achievement Award.

On December 27, 2018, Muzyka was appointed to the Order of Canada.
