= Jade Empire =

2005 action role-playing video game

- North American Xbox cover art
- Developer: BioWare (Note: Windows port was developed by LTI Gray Matter. macOS port was developed by TransGaming. iOS and Android versions were developed by Aspyr.)
- Publisher: Microsoft Game Studios (Note: 2K published the Windows version. TransGaming published the macOS port. Aspyr published the Android and iOS versions. Electronic Arts re-released the Windows version.)
- Director: Jim Bishop
- Producer: Jim Bishop
- Designer: Kevin Martens
- Programmer: Mark Darrah
- Artist: Matt Goldman
- Writers: Luke Kristjanson; Mike Laidlaw
- Composer: Jack Wall
- Platforms: Xbox: Windows; macOS; iOS; Android
- Release: April 12, 2005: Xbox; NA: April 12, 2005; EU: April 22, 2005; JP: June 16, 2005; AU: June 30, 2005; Windows; NA: February 27, 2007; PAL: March 2, 2007; AU: March 2, 2007; macOS; NA: August 18, 2008; iOS; WW: October 6, 2016; Android; WW: November 15, 2016
- Genre: Action role-playing
- Mode: Single-player

Jade Empire is an action role-playing game developed by BioWare, originally published by Microsoft Game Studios in 2005 as an Xbox exclusive. It was later ported to Microsoft Windows personal computers (PC) and published by 2K in 2007. Later ports to macOS (2008) and mobile platforms (2016) were handled respectively by TransGaming and Aspyr. In a world inspired by Chinese mythology, players control the last surviving Spirit Monk on a quest to save their tutor Master Li and defeat the dark forces behind his kidnapping. The Spirit Monk is guided through a linear narrative, completing quests and engaging in action-based combat. With morality-based dialogue choices during conversations, the player can impact both story and gameplay progression in various ways.

Development of Jade Empire began in 2001 as a dream project for company co-founders Ray Muzyka and Greg Zeschuk, who acted as the game's executive producers. Their first original role-playing intellectual property, the game reused the morality system from Star Wars: Knights of the Old Republic, but switched to a real-time combat system. The game's many elements such as its combat system, the world and script, the constructed language created for the game, and the musical score by Jack Wall drew influence from Chinese history, culture and folklore. Upon release, it received generally positive reviews but sold below expectations. It was followed by a PC version, which provided the basis for future ports and itself met with positive reviews.

== Gameplay ==
The protagonist faces enemies during an early portion of the game.

Jade Empire is an action role-playing game (RPG) in which players take control of a character most frequently dubbed the "Spirit Monk"; the Spirit Monk has six available pre-set character archetypes with different statistics: these statistics are split into health, magic energy (chi) and Focus, used to slow down time during combat or use weapons. The characters are divided into three male and three female characters, with a fourth male character being available in later versions. Exploration is carried out from a third-person perspective through mainly linear or hub-based environments, where quests can be accepted from non-playable characters (NPCs). Completing quests grants rewards of experience points, in-game currency and occasionally fighting techniques. In addition to standard gameplay, players can engage in a shoot 'em up mini-game with a flying machine, earning items and additional experience.

Combat takes place in real-time, with the protagonist and a chosen Follower fighting enemies either individually or in groups. Enemies range in type from normal humans to monsters and spirits. Attacks are divided into normal; heavy attacks, which take longer to execute while dealing higher damage; and area attacks, which damage multiple surrounding enemies. In addition to blocking, the protagonist and enemies can dodge attacks. The protagonist has access to different techniques, which range from purely offensive or guard-breaking techniques to healing and buffing techniques. Some fighting styles are hand-to-hand, while others are tied to a weapon type. In the console version, techniques are assigned to four face buttons, while the PC version has techniques assigned to number buttons. Magic-based attacks and techniques require Chi to function. Activating Focus during combat slows down time, allowing the protagonist to attack more freely as long as their Focus lasts. Defeated enemies can drop health and Chi.

Dialogue choices are tied into the game's moral alignments, called "Open Palm" and "Closed Fist". Neither path is meant to be based around good and evil, with their morality being based on a character's intent. The Open Palm primarily revolves around altruism, while the Closed Fist believes in self-reliance and can consequently be a more violent path. Selecting dialogue choices aligned to either the Open Palm or Close Fist paths alter how party members and NPCs respond to the protagonist, with a major choice during the final part of the game impacting the protagonist's alignment and the story's ending. Related to this is the ability to romance certain party members; out of two female and one male follower, one female and one male can be romanced by either male or female protagonists, while the second female can be romanced by a male. There is also an option to romance both females by a male protagonist, resulting in a love triangle situation.

== Synopsis ==
=== Setting and characters ===
The game is set in the Jade Empire, a fictional kingdom based on elements of Ancient Chinese history and Chinese mythology. Humans live side by side in the mortal realm with mystical creatures and monsters, while the heavens are ruled by the August Personage of Jade through a Celestial Bureaucracy. Human sorcerers are able to harness the Five Elements in their magic. There are two languages spoken in the Jade Empire: an unnamed primary language (represented by English) and Tho Fan, the "ancient tongue"; once common, Tho Fan's speakers have become scarcer in the Empire, though most inhabitants are able to understand it. In the Jade Empire's recent past, a devastating drought threatened to destroy everything, but the drought came to an end through the actions of Sun Hai, current ruling emperor of the Sun dynasty, leading to him being worshiped as the Empire's savior. Key locations include the isolated village of Two Rivers, where the story begins; Tien's Landing, a former major port now shunned due to its dark past; the Imperial City, seat of Sun Hai and center of the Jade Empire; and Dirge, a ruined temple haunted by the spirits of its inhabitants.

The protagonist, whose gender and name can be selected by the player, is a Spirit Monk rescued as a baby when the forces of Sun Li destroyed their order. Raised in the isolated village of Two Rivers, the protagonist has been trained in martial arts by Master Li. During their adventure, the protagonist is accompanied by and gains multiple followers. These include Dawn Star, a Two Rivers student who can communicate with the dead; Sagacious Zu, a hermit with a dark past; the Black Whirlwind, a ferocious but dim-witted mercenary; Henpecked Hou, a former arena fighter-turned-bunmaker; Wild Flower, a girl who shares her body with the benevolent spirit Chai Ka and the wicked spirit Ya Zhen; Sky, a former thief seeking revenge against his daughter's killers; Kang the Mad, a genius inventor who is in fact the banished deity Lord Lao; Zin Bu the Magical Abacus, a celestial trader and representative of the Celestial Bureaucracy charged with cataloging the destruction caused by the protagonist; and Princess Sun Lian, the daughter of Sun Hai who goes on covert missions using the alias "Silk Fox".

The main antagonists in Jade Empire are led by Emperor Sun Hai, the ruthless and corrupt ruler of the Jade Empire, and his mysterious, black-armored enforcer, Death's Hand, who leads the Lotus Assassins, a formerly monastic group who have turned to terror tactics to maintain order. Other characters include Gao the Greater and his son Gao the Lesser, who serve as the antagonists during the early narrative; Abbot Song, the head of the Spirit Monk order at Dirge; and the Water Dragon, shepherd of the dead and a key guide to the protagonist.

=== Plot ===
Shortly after completing their training at Two Rivers, the Spirit Monk helps fend off an attack by a Lotus Assassin, facing undead opponents in the process. Master Li reveals the Spirit Monk's past, his own identity as Emperor Sun Hai's brother Sun Li and role in the destruction of Dirge, and the increasing threat of the undead that is tied directly to Sun Hai. During a final training session to recover an amulet of their people, the Spirit Monk meets the spirit of the Water Dragon, who reveals that Sun Hai has incapacitated her and left the Spirit Monk as the land's only hope. Master Li's preference for the Spirit Monk pushes the impatient Gao the Lesser over the edge, leading to his expulsion. Gao the Lesser then kidnaps Dawn Star and summons Lotus Assassins allied with his father Gao the Greater. The Spirit Monk rescues Dawn Star and defeats Gao the Lesser with help from Sagacious Zu, but the Lotus Assassins—led by Death's Hand and his second-in-command Grand Inquisitor Jia—destroy Two Rivers and capture Master Li.

Using one of Gao the Greater's airships, the Spirit Monk travels to the village of Tien's Landing. During their time there, they fight and defeat Gao the Greater and learn that Master Li was taken to the Imperial Capital. While there, the Spirit Monk finds two missing pieces from their amulet, acquires a map of wind currents that will allow passage to the Imperial Capital, and helps the village by purging the neighbouring Great Southern Forest of a corrupting force and closing a large dam, which allows trading vessels to navigate the river again. They are also joined by Wild Flower, who guarded one of the amulet fragments; Black Whirlwind, who was hired to eliminate the monsters in the Great Southern Forest; Henpecked Hou, on the run from his wife; Sky, who was freeing slaves taken by the Lotus Assassins; and Kang the Mad, who was held captive by Gao the Greater. They are also first attacked and then aided by Silk Fox, who is determined to topple Death's Hand.

Using Kang's special airship, the party travels to the Imperial Capital, where Silk Fox meets them in her true role as Princess Sun Lian, Emperor Sun Hai's daughter. While in the Capital, the Spirit Monk gains access to the Lotus Assassins' ranks by competing in a local fighting tournament. Once among the Lotus Assassins, they dismantle them from within before retrieving the final amulet fragment from Grand Inquisitor Jia. Death's Hand then attacks, but Sagacious Zu sacrifices himself to collapse the Lotus Assassin base on Death's Hand. Led by Silk Fox, the group then infiltrate Sun Hai's palace, confronting the Emperor as he interrogates Master Li and finding him withered through using the Water Dragon's stolen power. After the Emperor's defeat, Master Li kills the Spirit Monk and steals both the completed amulet and the Water Dragon's power, setting himself up as the new Emperor.

The Spirit Monk is guided back to the living world by the Water Dragon and the ghost of Dirge's abbot, who reveals that Sun Li had conspired with his brother Sun Kin to seize the Water Dragon's power and kill Sun Hai after taking Dirge. The brothers' plot failed as the Water Dragon's power made Hai immortal. Kin was killed, while Li escaped and killed the Spirit Monk's rescuer, taking the child to mold into a weapon against Hai. Death's Hand was created by the Emperor by binding Kin's spirit to Li's armor. Returning to life in Dirge, the Spirit Monk reunites with their companions and holds off a vast assault from Li, who also sensed their return. In their final confrontation with Death's Hand, the Spirit Monk can either free or enslave Sun Kin's spirit. Infiltrating the Imperial Capital, the Spirit Monk's party fights their way through the palace and discovers the Water Dragon's body, torn open and preserved in a state between life and death to provide endless water to the Jade Empire. The Spirit Monk then goes to confront Li.

Depending on the player's choices at these points, one of several endings plays out. If the Spirit Monk surrenders to Li, they are remembered as a hero who knew their place, as the Empire becomes an oppressive dystopia. If the Water Dragon's body is further corrupted by the Spirit Monk, then they usurp Li's stolen power and emerge as the next Emperor following his death. If the Spirit Monk destroys the Water Dragon's body, then her spirit is freed, and the dead are able to find their way into the underworld, causing the people to rejoice and hail the Spirit Monk as a hero of the Jade Empire.

== Development ==
=== Basic concept ===
Jade Empire was developed by BioWare, after it earned critical and commercial success with Baldur's Gate, Neverwinter Nights and Star Wars: Knights of the Old Republic, RPGs based on pre-existing Dungeons & Dragons and Star Wars fictional universes. The game, which began development in May 2001, was the company's first original RPG intellectual property. The concept of Jade Empire had existed with company founders co-founders Ray Muzyka and Greg Zeschuk since they started BioWare alongside the plan that would lead to Baldur's Gate; called a "dream project", their aim was to fulfill player fantasies of becoming a powerful martial arts master. The game was first developed and released for the Xbox. Zeschuk later felt they should have held the game back and developed it for the console's successor the Xbox 360. Around 105 people were working on the game full-time.

=== Design ===
Art director Matt Goldman took inspiration from multiple eras of China's history when designing various aspects of the world, focusing between the Han and Ming dynasties. The environments were modeled on landscape artwork from the Song dynasty, while the color palette drew from the green-hued art of the Tang dynasty. For ancient artifacts based in an ancient civilization, Goldman drew inspiration from bronze artifacts dating from the Shang and Zhou periods. The wild areas were directly inspired by the Huangshan region. Different regions of the game were designed to reflect the differing social classes present in the Jade Empire. In addition to its Chinese inspiration, Goldman drew styling elements for both clothing and scenery from Japan, Thailand, Tibet, the Khmer Empire, and unspecified areas of South and West Asia. The monsters, while taking inspiration from brief descriptions in Asian literature, were mostly original creations for the game's world. Speaking of his experience on the game years later, Goldman described "fond memories" of the Canada-based development team working to create an Asian epic.

Creating the new combat system was one of the biggest challenges when developing the gameplay systems. Rather than the rule and turn-based combat of their earlier titles, the team wanted combat in Jade Empire to be in real-time, as the slower turn-based combat of their earlier works did not fit into its planned setting. The game's martial arts were primarily based on the kung fu and other real world styles of well known movie actors including Bruce Lee, Jackie Chan, Jet Li, Chow Yun Fat, Donnie Yen, Michelle Yeoh, Zhang Ziyi and others, and game designers used their own experience with kung fu, karate, aikido and capoeira to create the prototype "Deo" style. Implementing the combat system required creating a number of systems to handle combat without relying on pre-programmed fight choreography. A key element of the design was that managing character statistics was kept low-key so as not to interfere with the player's experience. The Dragonfly mini-game was designed by assistant producer Sheldon Carter. Carter based the mini-game on classic arcade top-down shooters such as Xevious and 1942.

Based on their experience with Knights of the Old Republic, the team developed Jade Empire using a new graphics engine. As part of the lighting system, the team used rim lighting to pick out the edges of characters and illuminate them using a local light source, creating a dynamic lighting effect to make characters look alive. A form of pixel flare, in which pixels reflect more light in bright conditions, was used to the same effect for areas in bright sunlight or the unrealistic lighting of parts of Heaven. The user interface, map and journal systems were all improved based on those used in Knights of the Old Republic to promote player comfort. The game was the first BioWare game to use motion capture for all human elements, contrasting with their work on Knights of the Old Republic, which was done using hand animation. The use of motion capture was intended to promote a sense of realism. The decision to use motion capture was influenced by the large number of animations required for combat actions. For several enemy characters, the staff used hand animation. When creating the prototype "Deo" fighting style, lead animator Deo Perez used his own experience with kung fu, karate, aikido and capoeira. Further refinement was done by the motion capture actors. Each style was based on a single real-life martial arts style.

=== Writing ===
While their previous work on other licenses had been described as "fun" experiences, BioWare staff were keen to work on an original world and storyline without any creative restrictions. The team quickly decided not to set the game in historical China, wanting the freedom to include fantasy elements, leading to them creating a world based on Chinese mythology. According to lead writers Luke Kristjanson and Mike Laidlaw, they used its inspiration to create a world that felt alive, with a variety of locals and social norms coexisting. Like BioWare's previous RPGs, its main focus was on telling a story, but a lot of the additional lore and finer detail was made optional so players would feel a degree of freedom in how they explored the story. Dialogue was intended to blend BioWare's established writing style with the game's Eastern influences. The game's morality system was designed to be an evolution and refinement of that used in Knights of the Old Republic. The menu-based dialogue choice system was carried over directly from Knights of the Old Republic.

The inspirations for the game's plot included the Classic Chinese Novels Outlaws of the Marsh, Romance of the Three Kingdoms and Journey to the West, in addition to Strange Stories from a Chinese Studio and more recent works such as The Deer and the Cauldron, Lone Wolf and Cub and Bridge of Birds. They also drew inspiration from Wuxia and samurai movies including Seven Samurai, Fist of Legend, Crouching Tiger, Hidden Dragon, Hero, Shaolin Dolemite and The Five Fingers of Death. The character Black Whirlwind was a homage by Laidlaw to Li Kui, a main character from Outlaws of the Marsh. Henpecked Hou followed a tradition in BioWare titles of including a character for comic relief, in addition to playing on Chinese narrative stereotypes. A notable side character is Sir Roderick Ponce Von Fontlebottom the Magnificent Bastard, a musket-wielding explorer from a foreign land used for comic relief. The character was generally influenced by the explorers of Medieval Europe who had historically been to China.

While much of the script is in English, many characters in the game speak Tho Fan, a 2,500-word Asian-style constructed language translated for players using English subtitles. Similar to the development of the Elvish languages for The Lord of the Rings, Tho Fan was developed to add to the personality, realism and immersion of to the setting of Jade Empire. The team chose not to use a real-world Asian language as Jade Empire was set in a fantasy world despite its Asian influence, with Tho Fan being used to add a level of exoticism for players. To create Tho Fan, BioWare contacted the linguistics department of the nearby University of Alberta; one of those who responded was Wolf Wikeley, then a student at the University with a master's degree in psycholinguistics and a candidate for a PhD in phonology. When Wikeley—a fan of Japanese anime and video games—was interviewed, he spoke several sentences in fluent fictional languages from various films and TV shows, impressing the BioWare staff and earning him the job.

The language, according to Wikeley, relies on soft sounds and most closely resembles Mongolian. When planning the new language, Wikeley asked the developers what temperament the people of the Jade Empire had, as it would impact the sound and delivery of the words. After this is worked on creating a basic dictionary based on word substitution, although some words were inside jokes such as "wankaawayi" (director), which referenced Hong Kong filmmaker Wong Kar-wai. Once the dictionary was complete, Wikeley set about creating unique grammar and language rules, such as the verb "to be" not existing, so it would not make the typical mistake of fictional languages of following the rules of a real language. Initially intended to be a lower class language denoting humility, a late change to the plot made Tho Fan a language of the Jade Empire's elite, turning its "deferential softness" into a mark of elegance.

=== Audio ===
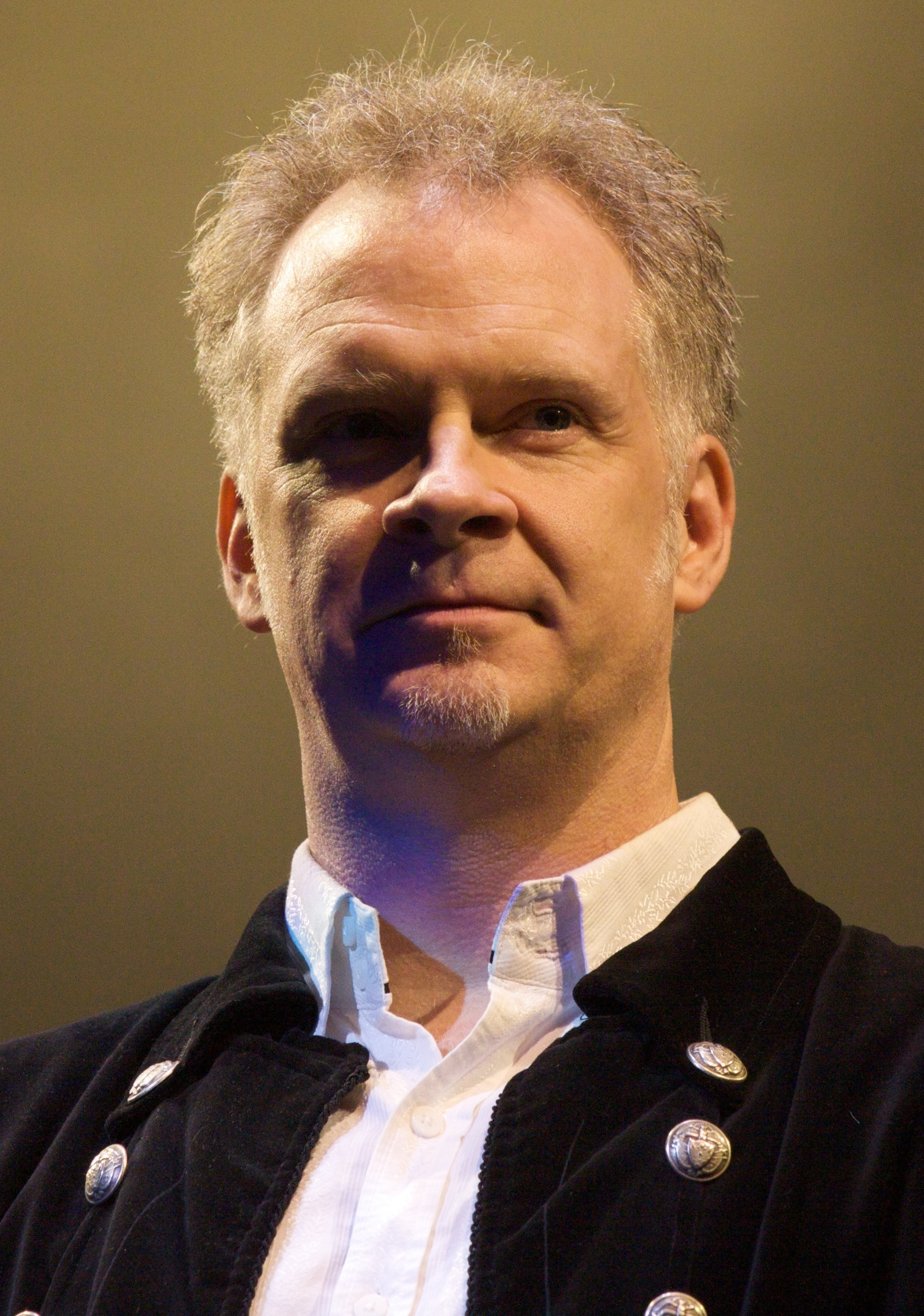
The music, composed and arranged by Jack Wall (pictured 2009), was written to emulate Eastern musical styles while blending it with Western elements.

The musical score of Jade Empire was composed by Jack Wall, who had previously worked on Myst III: Exile and its sequel. Wall was first approached by an audio manager at BioWare, with Wall later sending a demo tape, then later created a piece used in the game's first trailer. Wall decided to pursue the job because of his liking for BioWare's previous games, and accredited the trailer music with successfully getting the job of composer. Wall worked on the game from January 2004 to February 2005, coming in during the game's early development. From an early stage, Wall decided to create an orchestral rather than synthetic soundtrack, aiming for an "East meets West" aesthetic. A key member of staff whom Wall hired early on was Zhiming Han, a Chinese music consultant who was instrumental in maintaining the authentic sound of the score. Zhiming brought in several native Chinese musicians to perform the score, and helped by translating Wall's score into Chinese musical notation for the performers. The score was intended to feel generally Asian, incorporating traditional Chinese and Japanese percussion and wind instruments. Wall estimated that he composed over 90 minutes of music, ranging from environmental to cutscene-specific tracks, not including additional arrangements for shorter cutscenes by BioWare staff. A soundtrack album was released in 2005.

Every line of dialogue in the game, both English and Tho Fan, was fully voiced; Zeschuk and Martens estimated in different interviews that the recorded script came to over 320,000 words. The character of Dawn Star had 20,000 lines dedicated to her. One of the notable cast members was Nathan Fillion, whose role as Gao the Lesser was one of his earliest video game acting jobs. According to him, the script was written in a style he compared to broken English. When he talked with other actors on the project after the game was completed, he realized that they had rewritten the script into conventional English. He stated in 2017 that he would enjoy redoing those lines so they were easier to understand. Another notable cast member was British actor John Cleese, who voiced Sir Roderick Ponce Von Fontlebottom. Cleese became involved due to him and his agent being in Canada at the time voice recording was taking place. Upon being approached, Cleese was willing, and recorded all the character's lines during a single afternoon.

== Release ==
First hinted at in 2002 when BioWare announced a further partnership with Microsoft Game Studios following Knights of the Old Republic, the game was officially announced in September 2003, with further information being revealed at that year's Tokyo Game Show. Originally scheduled for release in March 2005, the game was pushed forward to April of that year. Along with the standard edition, a limited edition was produced that included an additional male playable character with unique combat abilities, and a special DVD detailing the production of multiple Xbox titles including Jade Empire. The limited edition was designed as a gift for those who pre-ordered the game, and was developed in parallel to the standard game. By February, the game had entered the final stages of production, with staff focusing on polishing work. The game released on April 12, 2005, two days prior to its announced release date. The game was later released in Europe on April 22, and in Australia on June 30. The limited edition, exclusive to North America and Europe, released alongside the standard edition. In Japan, the game was released on June 16 under the title Jade Empire: Hisui no Teikoku. (Note: Jeido Enpaia ~ Hisui no Teikoku ~ (ジェイド エンパイア ～翡翠の帝国～; lit. Empire of Jade))

The game had a marketing budget of $5 million.

=== Jade Empire: Special Edition ===
A version for Microsoft Windows personal computers (PC) began development at BioWare due to demand from their strong PC-based community. While developing the port, BioWare upgraded hundreds of different textures by hand; additional content including new fighting styles, new enemies, and the seventh character previously available in the Limited Edition of the Xbox version; refined the enemy and followers' artificial intelligence and reworked the controls for a keyboard and mouse. While the team had the option of publishing the title through Microsoft Game Studio, Microsoft were focused on developing games for Windows Vista alone, which clashed with BioWare's wishes to make the game available to a wide audience. For this reason, the team developed the PC version themselves and sought out a different publisher.

The PC version was first announced at the 2006 Electronic Entertainment Expo. Unlike the Xbox version, the PC version was published by 2K. The game went gold in February 2007, shortly before its North American release. The game released on February 27, 2007 in North America. It later released on March 2 in Europe and Australia. The downloadable version was released through Steam and BioWare's online store on February 28. It later released through GOG.com on June 11, 2013. A port of Special Edition for macOS was developed and published by TransGaming on August 18, 2008. Later ports for iOS and Android were developed and published by Aspyr respectively on October 6 and November 15, 2016.

== Reception ==
=== Critical reviews ===
Reception

Aggregate score
Aggregator	Score		
Aggregator	iOS	PC	Xbox
Metacritic	80/100	81/100	89/100

Review scores
Publication	Score		
Publication	iOS	PC	Xbox
Computer and Video Games	N/A	8.9/10	9/10
Eurogamer	N/A	7/10	8/10
Famitsu	N/A	N/A	29/40
GameSpot	N/A	7.8/10	8.4/10
GameSpy	N/A	4/5	5/5
IGN	N/A	8.6/10	9.9/10
PALGN	N/A	7.5/10	9/10
TouchArcade	4.5/5	N/A	N/A

Computer and Video Games spoke highly of the game, saying that the game's accessibility would attract those introduced to BioWare's Knights of the Old Republic, calling Jade Empire "imaginative, accessible, beautiful to look at and incredibly immersive to play". Rob Fahey of Eurogamer praised the aesthetics and replay value, but noted that the combat's lack of depth and limited customization options would be negatively viewed by some players. GameSpot's Greg Kasavin was positive overall, his only complaints being issues with combat balance and the game's short length. Will Tuttle of GameSpy lauded every aspect of the game, calling it "the best [RPG] to ever hit the Xbox". IGN's David Clayman was again highly positive, noting only camera difficulties that distracted from the flow of combat. Luke van Leuveran of PALGN called Jade Empire "an amazing action RPG", praising its story and combat system. Reviews of the Xbox version were positive overall, with the graphics and storyline coming in for the majority of praise. While the gameplay was seen as solid, its simplicity was frequently criticized. (Note: Computer and Video Games (for Xbox), Eurogamer (for Xbox), Famitsu (for Xbox), GameSpot (for Xbox), GameSpy (for Xbox), IGN (for Xbox), PALGN (for Xbox))

Suzy Wallace of Computer and Video Games felt that the Special Edition managed to reach beyond its roots on the Xbox to become a good-quality RPG for PCs, despite dated graphics and gameplay pacing issues. Fahay, returning to review the PC port, was disappointed at the lack of graphical polish and technical upgrades over its console counterpart. GameSpot's Kevin VanOrd shared points of praise and criticism with the Xbox review, while also noting that the PC version had few noticeable enhancements over the Xbox version. GameSpy's Allen Rausch enjoyed the storyline and gameplay, but noted the game's "grainy" cutscenes and some technical issues. Steve Butts, writing for IGN, generally enjoyed the game but found the combat repetitive and noted a lack of new content. Niel Booth, reviewing for PALGN, said that the game was enjoyable despite graphical and technical issues he raised. While sentiments towards the story and gameplay remained unchanged for the PC version, people noted that the original gameplay faults were heightened by the PC controls and that the graphics looked dated by modern gaming standards. (Note: Computer and Video Games (for PC), Eurogamer (for PC), GameSpot (for PC), GameSpy (for PC), IGN (for PC), PALGN (for PC))

Later responses have continued to be positive. In 2010, the game was included in the book 1001 Video Games You Must Play Before You Die. In a 2015 article, Mike Williams of USgamer said, "Jade Empire was such a unique game for BioWare, but it's one the studio never followed up on."

During the 9th Annual Interactive Achievement Awards, the Academy of Interactive Arts & Sciences awarded Jade Empire with "Role-Playing Game of the Year" and "Outstanding Character Performance - Female" (Kim Mai Guest as Dawn Star), as well as nominations for "Outstanding Achievement in Art Direction", "Outstanding Achievement in Original Musical Composition", and "Outstanding Character Performance - Male".

=== Sales ===
Upon its release, Jade Empire debuted at #3 on The NPD Group's video game sales chart for the month of April 2005. Writing for GameSpot, Tor Thorsen noted that its third-place finish came "despite [its] being released in the middle of April". It also secured second place on that month's Xbox chart, behind the debut of Doom 3 on the platform. In May, the game fell to last place on NPD's multiplatform top 20, and to seventh in the Xbox rankings. It was absent from both lists by the following month. According to NPD, the game's North American sales surpassed 385,000 units by May 2006.

In the United Kingdom, Jade Empire debuted at #7 on Chart-Track's multiplatform sales list for the week ending April 23. David Jenkins of Gamasutra called this "an unremarkable opening", and suggested that its sales had been damaged by competition from the newly released Unreal Championship 2. It fell to 12th place in its second week, and to 20th in its third. IGN's staff wrote of this decline, "The Bioware-developed game has been well reviewed over the past month, but that hasn't helped it from rapidly dropping down the charts." It was absent from Chart-Track's multiplatform top 40 by its fourth week of release. Conversely, on the firm's sales list for Xbox games, Jade Empire opened in first place and held the position for its debut 14 days. It fell to #5 in its third week, but remained in the top 10 until the week ending June 18. By the end of 2005, Jade Empire's sales totaled 45,000 copies in the United Kingdom, a performance characterized as substandard by Eurogamer's Kristan Reed.

As of July 2005, sales of Jade Empire had reached 500,000 units. BioWare's Greg Zeschuk later lamented the decision to release the game for Xbox, rather than as an Xbox 360 launch title. Speaking in 2013, he noted that "game sales are down [right now] because people are waiting for new consoles, and we released Jade Empire into that kind of window." Zeschuck concluded that "it would've been great to put off a bit and polish the game a bit more."

== Legacy ==
The decision to focus on both Jade Empire and their fantasy-themed Dragon Age: Origins resulted in BioWare passing over developing a sequel to Knights of the Old Republic. The sequel, titled Star Wars Knights of the Old Republic II: The Sith Lords, was given to Obsidian Entertainment. Alongside his work on Jade Empire, Wikeley also created four different constructed languages for the Dragon Age series. Wall would also work with BioWare again on Mass Effect and its sequel.

In January 2007, BioWare staff announced there were no plans to develop Jade Empire 2. However, BioWare co-founders Ray Muzyka and Greg Zeschuk stated in September 2011: "It's an IP, it's a setting that we were really passionate about, and we still are. Both Greg and I were big believers in the IP... We're just looking for the right way to deploy it." In 2009, GamesRadar included Jade Empire among the games "with untapped franchise potential", commenting: "The original game had all the trappings of franchise material with engrossing characters, magnificent settings, and a unique take on martial arts-fueled RPG combat. But until hard evidence of a sequel's existence materializes, we'll continue yearning for BioWare's one-off hit to attain franchise status."

Dakota Grabowski of GameZone listed Silk Fox and Death's Hand as #10 and #8 on their list of top ten BioWare created squadmates respectively. Kimberley Wallace of Game Informer included Wild Flower in her list of best BioWare characters; she called her unique among Jade Empire's cast of interesting characters and said "part of what makes her such a delight is seeing this child's interpretation and perspective on all the complex issues you face and what the spirits are telling her to say. As the journey goes on, it becomes a game of the two disparate perspectives talking through her, but part of the fight is trying to give Wild Flower the freedom and life she deserves." Jason MacIsaac from EP Daily also rated Wild Flower as among nine of the best BioWare characters.
