= Baldur's Gate II: Enhanced Edition =

2013 video game remastering

- Developer: Overhaul Games
- Publishers: Atari; Beamdog; Skybound Games (consoles)
- Series: Baldur's Gate
- Engine: Infinity Enhanced Engine
- Platforms: Microsoft Windows, OS X, iOS, Android, Linux, Nintendo Switch, PlayStation 4, Xbox One
- Release: Windows, OS X November 15, 2013 iPad; January 16, 2014; Android, iPhone, Linux; December 16, 2014; Nintendo Switch, PlayStation 4, Xbox One; October 15, 2019
- Genre: Role-playing
- Modes: Single-player, multiplayer

Baldur's Gate II: Enhanced Edition is a remaster of the role-playing video game Baldur's Gate II: Shadows of Amn and its expansion Baldur's Gate II: Throne of Bhaal. The game was launched on Microsoft Windows and Mac OS X. Baldur's Gate II: Enhanced Edition features new content and widescreen compatibility.

The remaster was developed by Overhaul Games, a division of Beamdog, and was published by Atari. The release includes remastered versions of the original Baldur's Gate II: Shadows of Amn and its expansion under an enhanced version of the Infinity Engine, known as the Infinity Enhanced Engine. The game was released on November 15, 2013 on PC and on the App Store on January 16, 2014.

== Gameplay ==
For all editions, the game follows 2nd Edition Advanced Dungeons & Dragons, licensed by Wizards of the Coast. The game features much of the same updated gameplay presented in Baldur's Gate: Enhanced Edition, with the same updated (including cross platform) multiplayer, which allows players from different platforms to play with each other. Major changes to this game's presentation include its higher resolution and widescreen viewing modes to enhance gameplay.

The iPad and Android versions present a radical departure from the original interface, with the multitouch screen allowing for gestures that can result in zooming in and out. This is to allow for larger text and more focus on enhanced detail. Tablet versions also allow for users to swipe between screens, eliminating the use for tabs. Ex-Bioware employee and creative director for the enhanced edition Trent Oster said: "When I describe playing a Baldur's Gate combat scenario to someone, I use the analogy of a football playbook. ... When you think about Baldur's Gate in this light, the iPad makes so much sense. In fact, I think Baldur's Gate is almost the perfect game for the touch interface—it was just released a decade early".

== Plot ==
=== Setting ===
Set in the Forgotten Realms continent of Faerûn, Baldur's Gate II: Enhanced Edition takes place in the nations of Amn and Tethyr. As with the original Enhanced Edition, all locations from the original production are present as well as new locations. Depending on the characters recruited, up to thirty new locations can be accessed.

=== Characters ===
While the original characters of Baldur's Gate II return once again, the Enhanced Edition brings back the new characters introduced in Baldur's Gate: Enhanced Edition - Neera the Wild Mage, Dorn Il-Khan the Blackguard, and Rasaad the Monk - who are once again recruitable, with two additional new characters, unique to Baldur's Gate II: Enhanced Edition - Hexxat the Thief, and Wilson the Bear. Each, like before, have a personal character quest that sees the player travelling to new locations, both in Shadows of Amn and Throne of Bhaal; the latter involves the characters bringing a close to their personal stories. Much like the previous game, all of new characters from Baldur's Gate: Enhanced Edition are once again available as romance options.

=== Story ===
The general plot of the game remains relatively unchanged, aside from the sidequests added in due to new characters. The largest new plot feature comes in the form of The Black Pits 2: Gladiators of Thay, an optional and standalone story which acts as a sequel to a challenge mode present in the previous Enhanced Edition. The mode pits players in gladitorial combat against such creatures as Mind Flayers, Githyanki and Demi-Liches.

== Development ==
Beamdog was in negotiations to get a contract for the first two Baldur's Gate games from Atari and Wizards of the Coast for approximately fourteen months before they were allowed to start working on the Enhanced Editions. Beamdog also needed to get a license to use the Infinity Engine from BioWare. Upon development, the decision was made to make the game available on the iPad. Baldur's Gate II: Enhanced Edition was slated for a 2013 release for both the PC and iPad. Nat Jones was named the official art director for the remasters, with senior Dungeons & Dragons writer Dave Gross also joining the team. Sam Hulick composed new music for the game.

Developer Trent Oster revealed that the Xbox 360 version for either remaster was canceled because the controller was not a good fit for the Infinity Engine. The Wii U version was also cancelled due to their negative experience with Nintendo while developing MDK2 HD. Sony contacted Beamdog about making both remasters available on the PlayStation 3, but nothing came out of it. Sony and Beamdog were unable to negotiate a price required for funding the redesign of the game, due to differences in controls and the UI between the PC and PlayStation 3.

The development of Baldur's Gate II: Enhanced Edition was initially put on hold in June 2013 due to legal issues with Atari before the resolution of the contractual and legal issues was made on August 15. The game was ultimately released in November of the same year.

Skybound Games, a division of Skybound Entertainment, released the remastered version to Nintendo Switch, PlayStation 4 and Xbox One on October 15, 2019.

== Reception ==
Reception

Aggregate score
Aggregator	Score
Metacritic	PC: 78/100 iOS: 70/100

Review scores
Publication	Score
Destructoid	8.5/10
Eurogamer	8/10
GameSpot	7/10
Hardcore Gamer	4.5/5
IGN	8.3/10
Nintendo Life	8/10
TouchArcade	5/5
Gameplanet	9/10
The Escapist	3.5/5

The game received positive review scores from most of the critics. On Metacritic, it holds an aggregate score of 78/100 for the Windows version while the iOS version holds an aggregate score of 70/100. Ryan Cartmel of the online magazine Hardcore Gamer gave the game a 4.5/5, saying that with its epic story, memorable characters, hundreds of hours of dungeon crawling, questing and adventuring, Baldur's Gate stands tall among the classics. He also said that due to its improved visuals Enhanced Edition will attract modern gamers. Patrick Hancock of Destructoid gave the release a score of 8.5/10 calling the remaster and the additions "impressive efforts with a few noticeable problems holding it back". Brett Todd of GameSpot gave the revision a review score of 7/10 praising the new additions to the game. Leif Johnson of IGN gave the game a review score of 8.3/10 praising it for the improved visuals and new additions.
