= Greg Zeschuk =

Canadian businessman and physician

Greg Zeschuk CM
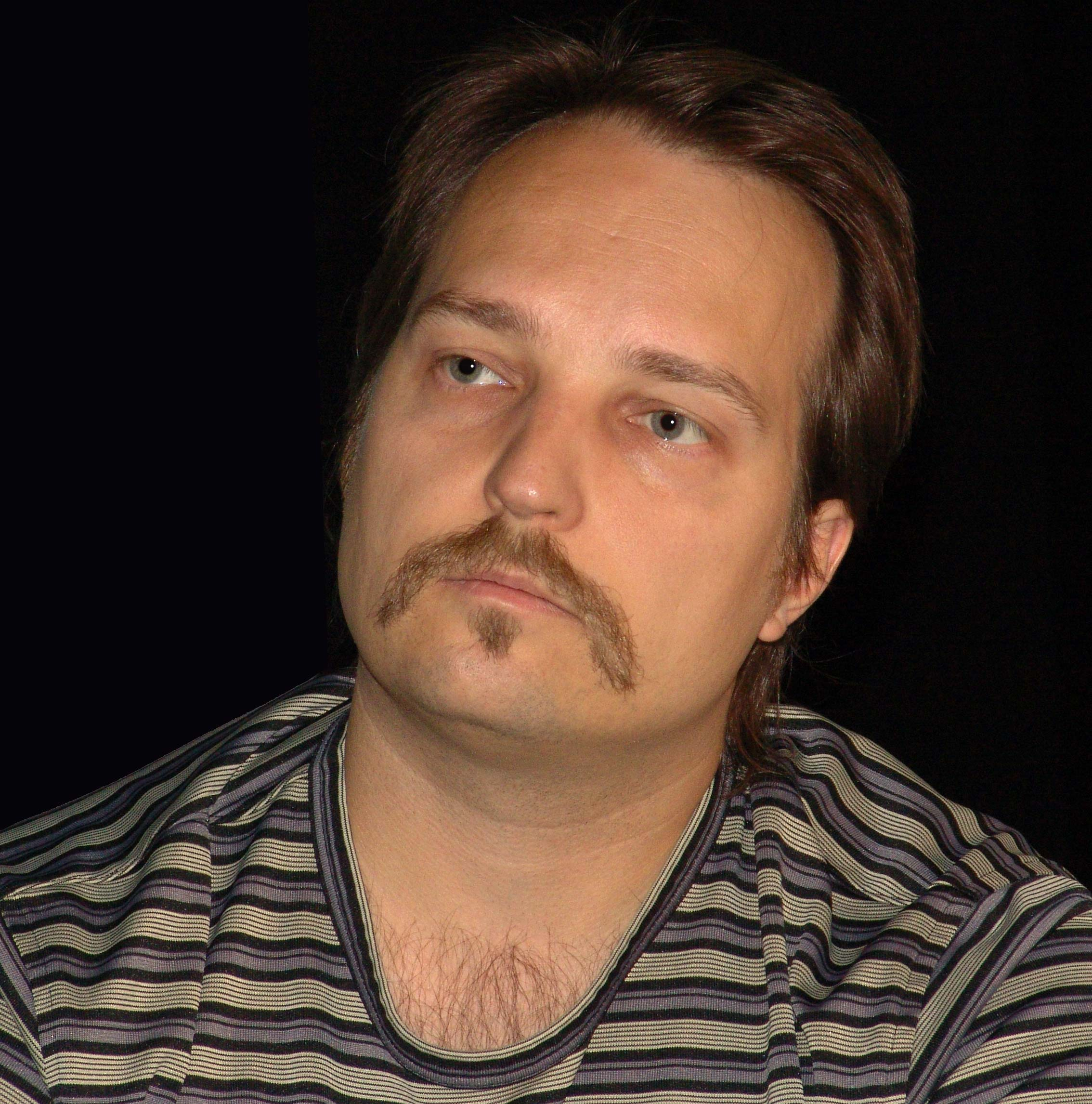
- Zeschuk in 2007
- Born: Gregory Zeschuk; 1969 (age 56–57); Edmonton, Alberta, Canada
- Known for: BioWare
- Awards: Lifetime Achievement Award (Game Developers Choice Awards, 2013); Member of the Order of Canada, 2018

Gregory Zeschuk CM (born 1969) is a Canadian businessman who was a VP at Electronic Arts and General Manager at BioWare Austin until 2012. He co-founded video game developer BioWare in Edmonton in 1995 with Ray Muzyka and Augustine Yip, after all three earned their medical degrees from the University of Alberta. Zeschuk announced his retirement from BioWare on September 18, 2012. He is currently involved in a number of projects related to the craft-beer industry, including the production of a web-based interview show known as "The Beer Diaries." Zeschuk is also the chairman of the board of the smart playground technology startup, Biba Ventures based in Vancouver, BC.

In 2009, he was chosen by IGN as one of the top 100 game creators of all time alongside Ray Muzyka.

In 2017 he opened Blind Enthusiam Brewing Co. inside Biera, his award winning restaurant, In Edmonton, Alberta. Then in 2022 expanded the brewing operations to a new location called The Monolith, also in Edmonton, Alberta, specializing in Spontaneous and Wild/Mixed culture beer. In 2023, The Monolith won Gold and Bronze in the Belgian Sour Beer Category at the prestigious World Beer Cup.

== Early life ==
Zeschuk was born and raised in Edmonton, Alberta, Canada. Growing up, Zeschuk played many role-playing games, including Dungeons & Dragons, saying he felt they were "always the strongest experience." During his childhood, he spent one summer making games on his Apple II computer with a group of his friends.

== Founding of BioWare ==
Zeschuk attended the University of Alberta, studying medicine, where he met fellow medical students Ray Muzyka and Augustine Yip working on medical simulation programs. During their residency, the first software they produced was called the Acid-Base Simulator. Zeschuk graduated in 1992, and was appointed Research Associate in the Division of Studies in Medical Education along with Muzyka. Zeschuk then spent two years training in both the US and Canada. In 1994, he and Muzyka began working on a piece of medical simulator software called Gastroenterology Patient Simulator. While working on this, the team realised they were more passionate about video game development rather than medical software. Zeschuck, Muzyka and Yip pooled together $100,000 and set out to make their first game. BioWare was incorporated on 1 February 1995 in a small room in Zeschuk's basement.

== Works ==
Year	Title	Role
1996	Shattered Steel	President and Joint-CEO
1998	Baldur's Gate	Lead Production
1999	Baldur's Gate: Tales of the Sword Coast	Lead Production
2000	Baldur's Gate II: Shadows of Amn	Executive Producer
2000	MDK 2	Executive Producer
2001	Baldur's Gate II: Throne of Bhaal	Executive Producer
2002	Neverwinter Nights	Co-Executive Producer (with Ray Muzyka)
2003	Star Wars: Knights of the Old Republic	Joint CEO
2004	Star Wars: Knights of the Old Republic II	Special Thanks
2005	Jade Empire	Co-Executive Producer
2006	Neverwinter Nights 2	Special Thanks
2007	Mass Effect	Executive Producer (President)
2008	Sonic Chronicles: The Dark Brotherhood	President
2009	Mass Effect: Galaxy	Director of Development
2009	Dragon Age: Origins	Vice-presidents (RPG/MMO Group)
2010	Mass Effect 2	Co-founder and VP
2011	Dragon Age II	General Manager, BioWare Austin
2011	Star Wars: The Old Republic	Co-founder, BioWare and BioWare MMO Business Unit General Manager, BioWare Austin General Manager, Vice President, EA
2012	Mass Effect 3	Co-founder BioWare, BioWare MMO Business Unit General Manager, BioWare Austin General Manager, Vice President, EA

== Awards and recognition ==
In 2011, the Academy of Interactive Arts & Sciences bestowed Zeschuk (along with co-founder Ray Muzyka) with the Academy's Hall of Fame award.

At the Game Developers Choice Awards, on March 27, 2013, Zeschuk received the Lifetime Achievement Award.

On December 27, 2018, Zeschuk was appointed to the Order of Canada.
