= MDK2 =

2000 video game

- PC cover art
- Developer: BioWare
- Publisher: Interplay Entertainment
- Producers: Cameron Tofer; Greg Zeschuk
- Designers: Cameron Tofer; Greg Zeschuk
- Programmer: Cameron Tofer
- Artist: Russ Rice
- Writers: Lukas Kristjanson; Greg Zeschuk; Dave Hibbeln
- Composers: Jesper Kyd; Albert Olson; Raymond Watts
- Series: MDK
- Platforms: Dreamcast, Windows, PlayStation 2, Wii
- Release: March 29, 2000: Dreamcast; NA: March 29, 2000; PAL: June 9, 2000 Windows; NA: May 25, 2000; EU: July 1, 2000 PlayStation 2; NA: March 26, 2001; EU: June 29, 2001 Wii; WW: May 9, 2011 MDK2 HD; WW: October 12, 2011
- Genres: Third-person shooter, action-adventure
- Mode: Single-player

MDK2 is a 2000 third-person shooter, action-adventure video game developed by BioWare and published by Interplay Entertainment for the Dreamcast, Windows and PlayStation 2. It is a sequel to the 1997 game MDK. First released for the Dreamcast in March 2000, it was later released for Windows in May, with newly selectable difficulty levels and the ability to manually save. In March 2001, a slightly reworked version, featuring level design modifications and gameplay tweaks, was released for the PlayStation 2 as MDK 2: Armageddon. The PC version was released on GOG.com in September 2008, and on Steam in September 2009. A port of the PlayStation 2 version was released for Wii via WiiWare in 2011. Also in 2011, a HD remastered version was released for Windows. Called MDK2 HD, this version features new 3D models, textures, improved lighting, and remastered music, and was released on Beamdog in October, and on Steam in July 2012.

The game begins moments after the end of the original MDK. Believing they had vanquished the alien invaders, Kurt Hectic, Dr. Hawkins and Max are shocked to find a single Minecrawler remains. Kurt heads to destroy it, but upon doing so, encounters a massive alien called Shwang Shwing, who reveals the invasion of Earth is far from over. The main difference between MDK and MDK2 is the ability to control three playable characters (Kurt, Hawkins and Max), each with their own strengths and weaknesses. As such, the gameplay in the sequel is more varied than in the original game, with more emphasis on platforming and puzzles than straight run-and-gun shooting.

MDK2 received generally positive reviews across all systems, with critics praising the graphics, variety of gameplay styles, level design, boss fights, the game's sense of humor, and its fidelity to the original MDK. The most commonly criticized aspects of the game were the difficulty level, which was felt to be too high, and the platforming sections, which many critics found frustrating and too exacting. Hawkins' levels in general were seen as inferior to Kurt's and Max's. In 2007, Interplay announced plans for a third game, but it was never made.

== Gameplay ==
Gameplay as Dr. Hawkins in MDK2. Note the importance of inventory items in this mode; the player can select any item from the left inventory and any item from the right inventory and try to combine them.

For the most part, MDK2 is a run-and-gun third-person shooter. However, unlike the original game, MDK2 features three player characters, each with their own unique set of abilities, skills, weaknesses, and style of gameplay. As such, the general game mechanics are more varied than in the first game, with the inclusion of more platform and puzzle-based elements than before. Except for the last level of the game, which can be played with any of the three playable characters, the player cannot choose which character to use in any given level; each level can only be played with a specific character, and as such, the level design of each level is specifically geared towards that characters' abilities.

Kurt Hectic

Kurt's levels play very similarly to the previous game. As before, the player must frequently use his "ribbon chute", a parachute contained within his outfit that can be used indefinitely. The chute allows Kurt to make long jumps, survive long falls, and utilize updrafts. It deploys immediately, and retracts automatically when not being used. Kurt's weaponry includes, but is not limited to, grenades, decoy dummies and cloaking shields. Kurt's main defense is his "Coil Suit," a skin-tight armor made of a Kevlar-like material. His weapon is a chain gun, which is attached to his arm, and carries unlimited ammo. His other weapon is a sniper gun, which is created when he detaches his chain gun from his arm and mounts it onto his helmet. The sniper weapon can zoom up to a mile, and has the capability of supporting multiple types of ammunition, including homing missiles, mortar shells, sniping grenades and bouncing bullets. However, when Kurt is in sniper mode, he is only able to strafe, he cannot move forwards or backwards, and can thus be easily targeted by enemies.

Max

Max, a two-legged, four-armed genetically engineered robotic dog, is the toughest of the three characters, with 200 health points. His gameplay is focused on high-impact firepower; standing on his two back legs, he can equip and shoot up to four guns at once. He has access to numerous weapons, such an uzis, shotguns, Magnums and gatling guns. Ammo is limited for all weaponry except his default Magnum. He is also able to wear two different types of jet pack. The standard jet pack uses fuel and when empty, must be refuelled at a fuelling pump. The atomic jetpack does not use fuel, instead refilling automatically when not in use.

Dr. Fluke Hawkins

Dr. Hawkins' levels focus on puzzle solving and platforming, with some elements of combat. He is the weakest of the characters, with only 60 health points. Most of his gameplay revolves around combining objects to create new objects, which in turn allow him to proceed through the level. He has two independent inventories, one for his right hand and one for his left. As such, each hand can hold a different item at the same time. Items from one inventory can be combined with items from the other, but items within the same inventory cannot be combined. His main weapon is an atomic toaster, which shoots radioactive toast.

== Plot ==
The game begins moments after the conclusion of MDK, with Kurt, Max, and Dr. Hawkins celebrating their victory over Gunther Glut, and thus saving Earth from the alien invasion. However, in the midst of their celebrations, they discover a remaining Minecrawler heading towards Edmonton. Kurt destroys it, but as he awaits to return to the Jim Dandy space station, he is taken prisoner by a massive alien. Meanwhile, on board the Dandy, Hawkins discovers that communications with Kurt are being jammed by a nearby alien ship. Max heads to the other ship to free up the communications. However, upon doing so, he too is taken prisoner by the same alien. The alien then contacts Hawkins on the Dandy, telling him his name is Shwang Shwing, and the invasion of Earth is not over.

Shwing sends a group of aliens onto the Dandy, but Hawkins is able to fight them off and teleport Kurt back to the ship. He then sends Kurt to the alien ship to save Max. However, shortly after Kurt's departure, Hawkins is taken prisoner by the aliens still on the Dandy. Kurt frees Max, and together they fight Shwing. During the battle, they learn Hawkins has been taken prisoner. Shwing initiates the auto destruct sequence, and jumps into an energy stream, followed by Kurt, whilst Max heads back to the Dandy to save Hawkins. Upon destroying a robotic dog constructed by the aliens, Max frees Hawkins, and uses a device on the dog to open a portal into which he heads. Meanwhile, Hawkins remains behind to take back control of the Dandy. After finally ridding the station of aliens, he finds the co-ordinates of their home world and sets course.

Meanwhile, Shwing emerges from the energy stream on the home world, Swizzle Firma, with Kurt following close behind. Kurt destroys his ship, and an injured Shwing tells Kurt the attacks on Earth have been ordered by Emperor Zizzy Ballooba. Meanwhile, Max emerges from the portal on Swizzle Firma, and learns Ballooba plans to launch a doomsday device at Earth which will obliterate the entire planet. Max kills Shwing as he attempts to launch the device, and then destroys the device itself. He then meets up with Kurt and heads to Ballooba's palace. Meanwhile, Hawkins pilots the Dandy to Swizzle Firma and contacts his colleagues. Aiming the station's guns at the palace, he attempts to teleport Kurt and Max back to the Dandy, but accidentally teleports himself to the planet, and so heads to meet with Kurt and Max.

The three storm Ballooba's palace. Upon confronting Ballooba, he admits he's only trying to destroy Earth for his own amusement, because, since he mastered space and time, he has become bored. A battle ensues between the three heroes and Ballooba, with the heroes emerging victorious. The closing sequence depends on which character the player uses for the final battle. Kurt resumes his duties as janitor of the Dandy, perturbed by the idea of becoming a celebrity. Max becomes the new emperor of Swizzle Firma, forming an interplanetary alliance with Earth. Hawkins is welcomed back to Earth, no longer shunned by his peers, and gets to work on his lifelong ambition – creating an atomic robot zombie army.

== Development ==
Immediately after the critical and commercial success of the original MDK, publishers Interplay wanted to begin work on a sequel. They approached Nick Bruty, who had written and co-designed the first game for Shiny Entertainment. However, Bruty was reluctant to go straight into another MDK game, explaining "I hadn't liked rushing from Earthworm Jim to its sequel without a creative break, and I felt the game suffered because of that." In any case, his new development studio, Planet Moon Studios, was already working on Giants: Citizen Kabuto. Bruty asked Interplay if they would consider waiting until he was finished on Giants before beginning on MDK2, but they chose to press on without him, handing development over to BioWare.

MDK2 was officially announced on October 18, 1998, when Interplay confirmed BioWare was developing the sequel for Dreamcast and Windows, using its own game engine, the Omen Engine. At the time, BioWare was thought by some to be an odd choice to take over the franchise, as they were still a relatively young company (having been founded in 1995), and had yet to release their breakout game, Baldur's Gate, which was in the final stages of development. Greg Zeschuk, co-founder of BioWare, stated "our aim with MDK2 is to explore new directions and expand beyond the constrictive environments established in other 3D games." He later explained "Bioware is aiming to create the ultimate single-player experience with MDK2. We're carefully crafting a tight, but humorous, world inhabited by the most frightening and entertaining creatures yet seen in a 3D game."

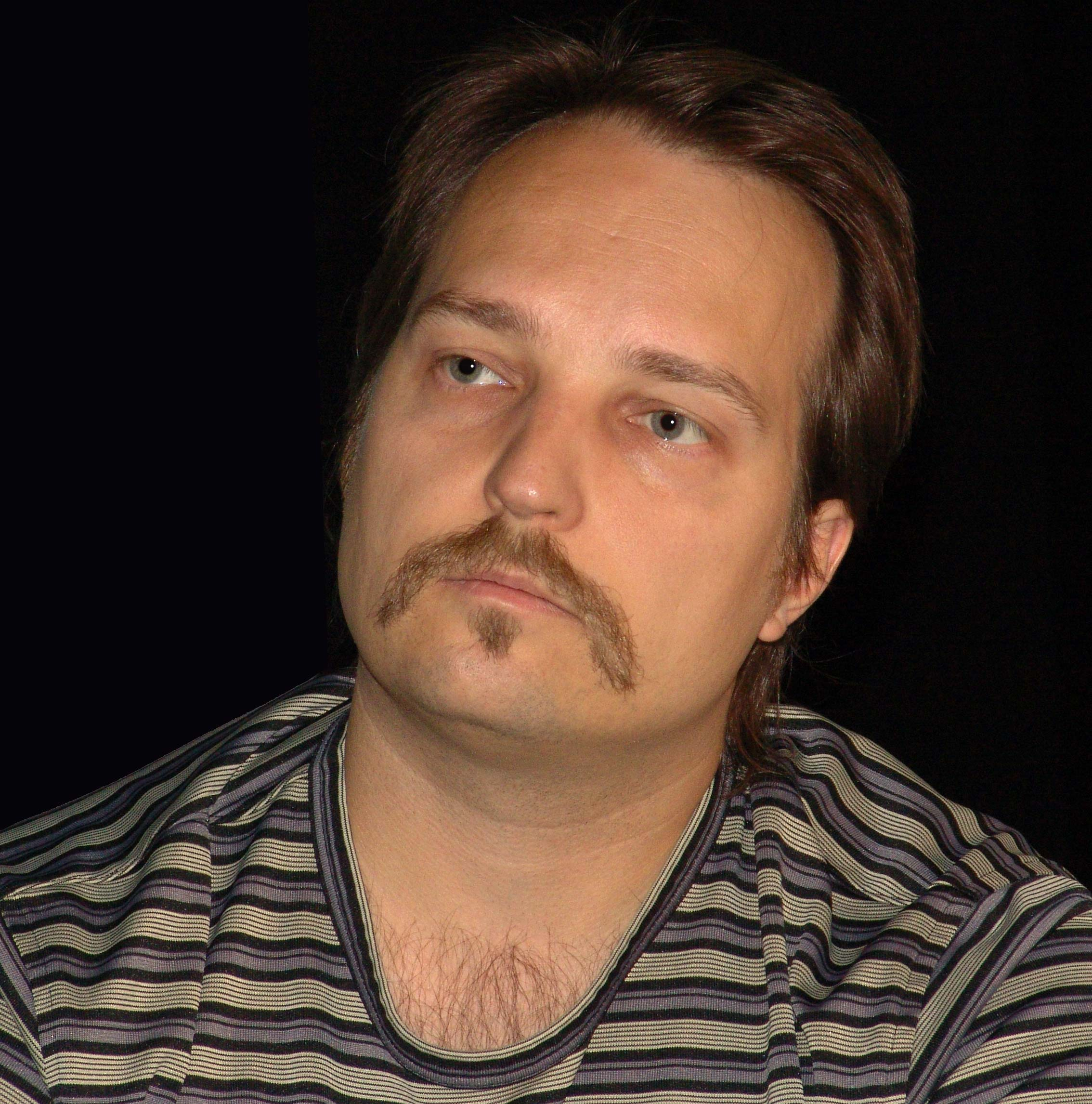
Greg Zeschuk, co-writer, co-producer and co-designer of MDK2

In July 1999, IGN interviewed Zeschuk. He emphasised the development team's relative inexperience with 3D action games was not a handicap;

No one at BioWare that worked on Baldur's Gate had previously even worked on a video game before. The team making MDK2 consists partly of the 3D development team responsible for our first title, the big mech action game Shattered Steel, some members of the Baldur's Gate team and a few people new to video game development. Our belief is BioWare has been successful in the past in spite of inexperience due a serious commitment to making great games. We like new challenges and we are really excited to try out new genres and development platforms. Our experience lies in understanding what makes a good game and then collecting and motivating a group of skilled individuals to make it happen.

Addressing the similarities between MDK2 and the original game, he explained "The key characteristics we retained in MDK2 were the humor and the light-hearted style of the game. The reasoning is pretty straightforward - the humor and style of MDK set it apart." He praised the original game, stating "There isn't much I would change about MDK. It could have been a little longer, it would have been well served by more character development and it really needed a method to tell the story of the game. We're directly addressing all of these areas in MDK2." Speaking of how much MDK2 was influenced by MDK, he explained "I can't even begin to explain the strength of the visual influence that the original MDK has over MDK2. I was very impressed when I first saw MDK and I'm even more impressed after having played it many times. In many ways, in MDK2 we're striving to reach the goal Shiny set with the original by using new and improved technology."

Explaining why BioWare had elected to have three playable characters, he said,

The decision to add Max and the Doctor as player characters to MDK2 was actually somewhat of an evolution, culminating in an epiphany. We planned to add in-game movies to MDK2 and therefore needed to make 3D models for both Doctor Hawkins and Max. In addition, these models needed to have basic animations for running, walking and other simple actions. One day while chatting with Jim Boone (our Interplay producer) on the issue of gameplay variety, it just sort of came to us. Since we've got these cool character models and they already move around, why don't we just allow the player to take control of them from time to time. It all snowballed from there and the next thing we knew we had three completely separate yet equal player characters. The largest impact to the gameplay experience, in our opinion, will be an increased variety to the gameplay. Players will have to quickly change gears between the run and gun shooting style of Max, the stealthy style of Kurt and the puzzling style of the Doctor.

The introduction of two newly playable characters also removed the need for minigames, which were an important element of the original MDK; "Our initial opinion is the huge variety of gameplay styles generated by our focus on three characters should replace the need for sub-games. A key focus during our development of MDK2 was to get away from the sense of perpetual strafing and shooting - in addition to the character solution, we've added quite a few puzzles to the game."

=== PC release ===
In May 2000, after the release of the Dreamcast version but prior to the release of the PC version, BioWare announced two significant changes had been made to the game. The Dreamcast version had been criticized for being too difficult, and so for the PC version, Bioware were adding four difficulty settings ("Easy", "Medium", "Hard" and "Jinkies"), as well as the ability to manually save anywhere (although the autosave checkpoints from the Dreamcast versions would remain in place). Unlike most other PC games released at the time, the PC version of MDK2 requires an OpenGL-compliant graphics accelerator to run. The PC version of MDK2 also supports the EAX Version 2.0 3D positional audio technology by Creative Labs, as well as Hardware T&L technology found in GeForce 256/GeForce 2 series and Radeon R100 series out of the box.

=== MDK2: Armageddon ===
In September 2000, after the game had been released for Dreamcast and PC, but prior to its PlayStation 2 release, IGN held an online discussion with Greg Zeschuk, line producer Derek French, lead programmer David Faulkner, and programmer Charles Randall. Zeschuk said the PlayStation 2 version, titled MDK2: Armageddon would feature the same difficulty tweaks as found in the PC version (adjustable difficulty levels and the ability to save anywhere), as well as slight redesign within most of the levels and some gameplay tweaks. Zeschuk stated "MDK2: Armageddon is an improved version of MDK2, with specific features for the PS2. It's not a completely new game. But it is an improved, customized game."

Faulkner and Randall explained the game was still utilizing the Omen Engine, with Faulkner saying of programming for the PlayStation 2 "The PS2 is certainly good at pushing polys, no doubt about that. And the two vector processors can handle the physics and geometry we have with room to spare. The trick is the video memory, mainly. All of the cool visual features, like a high-res framebuffer, FSAA and high-res textures all take a lot of video memory. It's a real juggling act trying to get it to do all that at once." Faulkner explained "the PS2 math capabilities are like Intel's SSE, but on steroids. The math processors can be used to optimize any kind of math operations, which, in a 3D game, means a lot. So they will basically be used to speed up a lot of the 3D transformations and lighting."

In November, IGN held a second online chat with Zeschuk, Falkner, programmer Marc Audy, lead tester Karl Schreiner, and tester Derrick Collins. Zeschuk stated Sony had recently looked at the game and been very impressed; "They felt the gameplay improvements we've made (overall better balancing and reworking parts of every level), combined with the difficulty levels and slick controls really make MDK2: Armageddon for PS2 the definitive version of the game." Speaking of his earlier problems with video memory, Faulkner said "the video memory situation has improved dramatically since last time. The problem was that there was too little video memory to fit all our textures, and the machine can't use a texture unless it's specifically in video memory. What we've found since then is that the PS2 has enough bus bandwidth to transfer each texture from main memory to video memory as it's needed. That's on the order of hundreds of MB per second. We hadn't anticipated that the PS2 had that kind of brute horsepower on its bus. We had to reorient our thinking after that. So now we have almost more texture memory than we know what to do with."

Gameplay tweaks introduced in MDK2: Armageddon include bigger switches, weaker and repositioned enemies, and wider ledges in platforming sections. Additionally, red arrows have been used to mark the important parts of the levels, and flashing circles point out where to shoot certain bosses. The game also features fully customisable controls, which take advantage of the pressure sensitive analog sticks of the DUALSHOCK 2.

=== Wii port and MDK2 HD ===
On June 25, 2010, Interplay announced it was partnering with Beamdog to release a port of MDK2 for the Wii through WiiWare, and a HD remastered version for Windows through Beamdog. The Wii version features brighter graphics, and the game has been optimised for control with the Wii Remote and Wii Nunchuk. Essentially a port of MDK2: Armageddon, the game features no new content. Due to the limited space available for the title on WiiWare, the audio has been compressed, and graphically, shadows have been removed to maintain a constant framerate. The game was released on May 9, 2011.

The HD version was developed by Overhaul Games, although several of the original developers consulted on the project. Programmer, co-producer and co-designer of the original game, and COO of Overhaul Games, Cameron Tofer stated, "MDK2 holds a special place in all our hearts – the team was really close, and it was the first time many of us were able to create an action game at BioWare. We think MDK2 HD has the sort of visuals, humor and great gameplay that can draw in not only existing fans of the game, but a brand new audience that just wasn't able to experience its magic the first time around." The game features high-definition 3D models, reworked textures, improved lighting, and remastered music tracks. MDK2 HD was originally released exclusively on Beamdog in October 2011, and was later released on Steam in July 2012.

== Reception ==
Reception

Aggregate scores
Aggregator	Score			
Aggregator	Dreamcast	PC	PS2	Wii
GameRankings	88%	86%	81%	80%
Metacritic		83/100	80/100	

Review scores
Publication	Score			
Publication	Dreamcast	PC	PS2	Wii
Eurogamer		9/10		
GameFan		95/100		
GameRevolution	B+			
GameSpot	8.3/10	7.8/10	7.6/10	
IGN	9.4/10	8.3/10	8.7/10	
Maximum PC		9/10		
Next Generation	4/5	4/5	4/5	
Nintendo Life				8/10
Nintendo World Report				8.5/10
Official U.S. PlayStation Magazine			3.5/5	
PC Gamer (US)		88%		

MDK2 received mainly positive reviews across all systems. The Dreamcast version holds an aggregate score of 88% on GameRankings, based on twenty-six reviews. The PC version holds a score of 86%, based on twenty-nine reviews, and 83 out of 100 on Metacritic, based on twenty-three reviews. The PlayStation 2 version holds a score of 80%, based on thirty-five reviews, and 80 out of 100, based on nineteen reviews. The Wii version holds a score of 80%, based on four reviews.

=== Dreamcast ===
IGN's Brandon Justice scored the Dreamcast version 9.4 out of 10, giving it an "Editor's Choice" award, and calling it "a must own." He praised the "breath-taking combination of killer artwork and creative level design," and argued the game improved on the original in every way. He was especially impressed with the boss fights, the controls and the level design. He concluded "MDK2 is this generation's best example of a pure action shooter, and goes down in my book as one of the genre's most complete titles to date. Awesome visuals, creative design, killer boss encounters, excellent control, tons of variety, and even a dash of challenge thrown in for good measure. Nearly every aspect of BioWare's sensational sequel shines in a way that sheds a painfully revealing light on their competitors' glaring inadequacies."

Game Revolution's Duke Ferris scored the game a B+, praising the graphics, but criticizing the difficulty level, writing "you have unlimited lives in MDK2, and it is a strictly linear game with fixed checkpoints. This means that when you get to a hard section, your only choice is to do it over and over again until you get to the next checkpoint. After playing the exact same level for the 30th time, this can get frustrating." However, he concluded, "the non-frustrating times in MDK 2 are simply tons of fun. The game is genuinely funny, has great voices and a terrific comic book flair."

GameSpot's Ben Stahl scored it 8.3 out of 10, calling it "a sizable improvement over the original game," and arguing "MDK 2 is a solid shooter with one of the most creative play mechanics to appear in any game thus far." He praised the graphics, the music and the sound effects. Although he was critical of "how needlessly difficult it is," he concluded "MDK2 is a worthwhile experience. The offbeat humor and silly aspects enhance the great storyline and give the game a very likeable nature while the different game mechanics keep it from being a mundane shooter. The graphics and sound are truly excellent, making it one of the best-looking and best-sounding Dreamcast games yet."

Matt Sammons reviewed the Dreamcast version of the game for Next Generation, rating it four stars out of five, and stated that "A beautiful, action-packed game with constantly changing gameplay. Not to be missed."

=== PC ===
Eurogamer's Tom Bramwell scored the PC version 9 out of 10, praising its fidelity to the original, but also lauding BioWare's willingness to try new things. He called the graphics "simply breathtaking," and concluded, "With so many interesting things to do and unique puzzle-driven gameplay, the fact that it still harbours a linear style of play can be discounted to a certain extent. Reinvigorate your childhood fantasies of living in a cartoon and pick up MDK2 - there ain't much better in the genre."

IGN's Stephen Butts scored it 8.3 out of 10, calling it "one of the best console experiences on the PC in a while." He praised the controls and boss fights, but criticized the difficulty and platforming sections. He concluded "when a game comes out for the PC that manages to retain all the simplicity and energy of its console brother, then you owe it yourself to give it a try. MDK 2 is definitely such a game."

GameSpot's Erik Wolpaw scored it 7.8 out of 10, writing "It improves on the original's technology and expands its gameplay without losing the off-kilter sense of humor that helped make MDK so unique." He was critical of the platforming sections, but wrote "it's a testament to the great amount of imagination displayed throughout the majority of the game that you'll gladly suffer through these occasional tiresome segments to see what comes next." He praised the boss fights, the addition of the manual save feature, and the choice of difficulties, concluding "while console-style action games are becoming more common on the PC, good ones are still rare. MDK2 may be slightly short, but it makes up for it by being relentlessly ingenious."

Kevin Rice reviewed the PC version of the game for Next Generation, rating it four stars out of five, and stated that "Not revolutionary, but a near-perfect example of excellent design and control coupled with psychedelic creativity. Superb."

=== PlayStation 2 ===
IGN's Chris Carle scored the PlayStation 2 version 8.7, giving it an "Editor's Choice" award. Although he felt the graphics weren't as good as the Dreamcast version, he did feel the particle effects were better. He praised the sound, voice acting, controls and level design, arguing "MDK 2: Armageddon is a great action title that is certainly worth twenty hours of your time."

GameSpot's Ben Stahl scored it 7.6 out of 10, calling it "a more rewarding and less frustrating version of what was an excellent Dreamcast game." However, of BioWare's addition of helpful arrows during puzzles and boss fights, he wrote "it would have been better if Bioware had actually tweaked the puzzles instead of simply pointing out the answer." He was also critical of the absence of the manual save feature from the PC version, and found some of the levels repetitive. He concluded "It's a bit disappointing that the year of development time between the Dreamcast and the PS2 versions of MDK2 wasn't put to better use. While the difficulty issues have been addressed to some extent, there are still areas that need work. Still, MDK2: Armageddon is a solid shooter with plenty of ingenuity and slick presentation."

Chester Barber reviewed the PlayStation 2 version of the game for Next Generation, rating it four stars out of five, and stated that "This is easily one of the best action games available for PS2. Although it's not very different from the DC version, if you've never played it, you owe it to yourself to try it."

=== Wii ===
Nintendo World Report's Jared Rosenberg scored the Wii version 8.5 out of 10, praising its use of the Wii's controls, but criticizing the graphics, writing "It is obvious that the game is over 10 years old. Character and enemy models are noticeably low polygon, and the textures seem muddy and N64-like at times." However, he concluded "MDK2 is a well-designed action platformer that will take quite a bit of time to get through its 10 levels. Varied play mechanics keep the shooter fresh and the humorous story should occasionally put a smile on your face. It can be challenging and at times frustrating, but overall, it is a fun romp."

Nintendo Life's Jon Wahlgren scored it 8 out of 10, calling it "one of the strongest titles yet to hit WiiWare." He was somewhat critical of the "frustrating" platform sections, and found Hawkins' levels "a tedious detour from what makes the game enjoyable." However, he praised the game's variety and sense of humour. He concluded "MDK2 is at its best when it goes nuts with large, crazy enemies and bullets galore through its strange environments, but not so much when it comes to puzzle-solving or platforming."

== Cancelled sequel ==
In 2006, Interplay revealed it was planning on developing an MMOG set in the Fallout universe. However, the project was estimated at $75 million, money unavailable to the company. As such, in an effort to secure the capital, they explained in papers filed with the Securities and Exchange Commission on November 13, 2007, that they planned to leverage their stable franchises "through sequels and various development and publishing arrangements". Specifically, they announced they were restarting their in-house development studio, the money to do so coming from the sale of the Fallout franchise to Bethesda Softworks, from whom they planned to license the Fallout IP for the MMOG. They specifically mentioned plans for sequels to Descent, Earthworm Jim 2, MDK2 and Baldur's Gate: Dark Alliance II.

In 2008, Interplay confirmed a "two-pronged growth strategy" which would see the company leveraging its portfolio of gaming properties to create sequels and raise money for the Fallout MMOG. The same four games were again mentioned, with CEO Herve Caen stating, "2007 set the foundation for our growth strategy. Going forward, we have the vision, unique intellectual property, and low debt and operational costs to help us pursue financing for our various projects." However, nothing further was heard about any of the possible sequels, which have presumably all been cancelled.

In 2010, following the release of Mass Effect 2, IGN asked BioWare's Ray Muzyka if they had any plans to make MDK3, to which he replied, "You'll have to ask Interplay, they have the license for that."

A poster for the game featuring Dr. Hawkins can be seen in the 2001 TV movie How to Make a Monster.
