= Baldur's Gate: Tales of the Sword Coast =

Video game expansion pack

- Developer: BioWare
- Publishers: Black Isle Studios; Interplay Entertainment; JP: Sega
- Producer: Ben Smedstad
- Designer: James Ohlen
- Programmer: Mark Darrah
- Artist: Marcia Tofer
- Writer: Luke Kristjanson
- Composer: Michael Hoenig
- Series: Baldur's Gate
- Engine: Infinity Engine
- Platforms: Microsoft Windows; Mac OS
- Release: Microsoft Windows: NA: May 4, 1999; EU: May 14, 1999; JP: February 18, 2000; Mac OS: NA: May 29, 2001
- Genre: Role-playing
- Modes: Single-player, multiplayer

Baldur's Gate: Tales of the Sword Coast is an expansion pack of the fantasy role-playing video game Baldur's Gate. Developed by BioWare and published by Interplay, it adds 20 to 30 extra hours of gameplay, including the addition of four areas and minor tweaks to some of the mechanics. The expansion consists of four notable quests that take place within the same game world as Baldur's Gate, and sees players taking their character (referred to as the Ward) and their party of companions across the Sword Coast, from travelling to a distant island, to exploring the fortress dungeon of a dead dwarf. Tales of the Sword Coast sold 600,000 units by 2003.

== Gameplay ==
The expansion retains the same fundamental gameplay mechanics of Baldur's Gate. The new areas incorporated into the same world map as the original game, a number of tweaks and improvements were made. These include:

- The experience point cap being raised to 161,000, allowing characters to reach higher levels.
- The user interface receiving a number of improvements.
- Identical items automatically stack.
- Unidentified items display a blue tint to make it easier to distinguish them.
- The abilities of the thief class are toned down.

In addition, if the player had completed the original game, the expansion features the option of loading a save game of their player character and their party, placing them within the new settlement of Ulgoth's Beard, where most of the quests begin.

== Plot ==
=== Setting ===
Baldur's Gate: Tales of the Sword Coast takes place around the same time of the original game, and within the same region of Faerûn. The expansion adds a number of locations, including the small town Ulgoth's Beard, a mysterious island in the Trackless Sea, the Isle of Ice, and the ruins of Durlag's Tower. While it provides additional side quests, these do not impact the original game's main story, especially if it is ongoing.

=== Story ===
A party of adventurers consisting of Gorion's Ward and their companions travel to Ulgoth's Beard, a small town with great adventuring possibilities. They meet with a mage called Shandalar who asks them to recover a cloak of his from the Isle of Ice, forcefully teleporting them to the island. The Ward's party fight against those who were trapped in the island's dungeon, recovering the cloak and managing to return with it.

Heading to the town's docks, the party encounters Mendas, a man who seeks help for an expedition to track down the ship used by Balduran. After returning with a sea chart that had been found by a local guild in Baldur's Gate, the party travel across the Trackless Sea. A storm to shipwrecks them on an island, where they discover a village. The Ward's party learn from the village's chief that they suffer from werewolf attacks, to which the party agree to help deal with them, learning that the creatures reside in the wreck of Balduran's ship. Venturing towards it, the group encounter an elven mage in a cave, who reveals the truth behind the incident aboard Balduran's ship, and that the villagers are not what they seem to be. Defeating what turns out to be wolfweres, the party returns to the village to find that all the villagers were actually werewolves, forcing them to fight through them, including a Loup Garou, in order to escape the island. Returning to Ulgoth's Beard, the group learns that Mendas is a werewolf and had sent them out to help him bring back the village chief, his mate, along with the villagers, in order for them to roam free across the Sword Coast. Upon learning of what the Ward did, Mendas transforms into a Loup Garou and attacks the party, but is defeated.

In the town's inn, the party encounter Hurgan Stoneblade, a dwarf, who asks them to help him recover the Soultaker Dagger from the dungeons beneath Durlag's Tower. The party travel to the ruined tower for a guided tour, just as a powerful Demon Knight claims control over the ruins and its dungeon, forcing the party to fight past several creatures while overcoming the traps and puzzles set up by Durlag, defeating the Demon Knight and recovering the Soultaker. Upon returning to Ulgath's Beard, the group are accosted by a member of a cult, who steals the Soultaker from them. Forced to take it back, the party venture into the cult's hideout, but arrive too late to stop them from summoning demon from the Abyss called Aec' Letec. Fighting it, the party defeat the cult and kill the demon, preventing it from escaping into the rest of the Sword Coast, while ending their final adventure in the town.

== Development ==
Baldur's Gate: Tales of the Sword Coast began development in 1998. Mark Asher of CNET Gamecenter reported that it was already "several months" into production by January 1999. The game was officially announced in early February.

Tales of the Sword Coast went gold on April 26, 1999, and shipped to retailers on May 4.

== Reception ==
=== Sales ===
Tales of the Sword Coast debuted at #1 on PC Data's computer game sales chart during the May 2–8 period, and held the position the following week, but fell to #6 in its third week. The game remained in the top 10 for the entirety of May, and was the second-best-seller of the month overall, behind Star Wars: Episode I – The Phantom Menace. By the week ending June 12, the game had fallen off the weekly charts, but it finished in 17th place on PC Data's monthly chart for June. In the United States alone, sales of Tales of the Sword Coast reached 156,000 copies by March 2000.

By late 2003, global sales of Tales of the Sword Coast had surpassed 600,000 copies.

=== Critical reviews ===
Reception

Aggregate score
| Aggregator | Score |
|---|---|
| GameRankings | 85% |

Review scores
| Publication | Score |
|---|---|
| Computer Games Magazine | 4.5/5 |
| Computer Gaming World | 4/5 |
| PC Gaming World | 8.5/10 |

Awards
| Publication | Award |
|---|---|
| Computer Games Strategy Plus | Add-on of the Year (finalist) |
| GameSpot | Best Expansion Pack (finalist) |

The expansion was critically well received. In the review from GameSpot, the game was found to feature "some occasionally frustrating battles, adds only minor gameplay enhancements, and takes a few additional liberties with AD&D rules", but the new areas and game content were found to be well-designed and interesting. Computer Games Strategy Plus called it "a solid add-on to an excellent title", but complained that glitches occasionally caused the game to crash. According to GameSpy, "especially for new players, the 'add-in' structure would make an already rich experience richer, improving one's Baldur's Gate experience immeasurably".

Tales of the Sword Coast won the Origins Awards for "Best Roleplaying Computer Game of 1999". It was a runner-up for Computer Games Strategy Plus's 1999 "Add-on of the Year" and GameSpot's "Best Expansion Pack" awards, but lost these prizes to Heroes of Might and Magic III: Armageddon's Blade and Half-Life: Opposing Force, respectively.
