= Shattered Steel =

1996 video game

- Developers: BioWare (DOS); Logicware (Mac)
- Publisher: Interplay Productions
- Producers: Greg Zeschuk (BioWare); Feargus Urquhart (Interplay)
- Designers: John Winski; Patrick Winski
- Composers: Brian Luzietti; Mark Morgan
- Platforms: MS-DOS, Mac OS
- Release: September 27, 1996 (DOS); December 8, 1997 (Mac)
- Genre: Mech simulator
- Modes: Single-player; Multiplayer

Shattered Steel is a mech simulation game developed by BioWare and published by Interplay Productions for MS-DOS in 1996. It was later ported to Mac OS by now-defunct Logicware. It is notable for the deformable terrain effects, and for being BioWare's first developed game.

== Story ==
Shattered Steel takes place in a desolate future where humanity is on the verge of extinction. The single-player campaign takes place over 5 separate worlds (planets); each planet has about 20 missions.

The enemy in the game is a group of aliens who are in some way or another organic, mechanical or a combination of both. Examples of this are the Aspis, a spider-like enemy with an organic look and the Wasp, a very mechanical looking air vehicle. As the story unfolds, more is discovered about who controls the aliens, what their purposes are, and how to destroy them once and for all.

== Gameplay ==
Cockpit view

Upon exiting the game, a screen is displayed that advertises expansion packs and a sequel.

The gameplay is similar in style to the MechWarrior video game series, featuring mechanized combat in bipedal machines called "Planet Runners". Runners do not generally take humanoid shapes - only two of them, the Retro and Shiva, have a distinct human shape and neither of them have arms. Some of the Runners are based around animals, such as the Raptor, with a very overbearing appearance and "Chicken walker" style legs, with claw-like feet. The enemies are somewhat more varied but generally center around animals such as spiders, scorpions and the praying mantis.

All of the Runners have a specific weight limitation, and can have their weapons, shield generator and engines interchanged and removed based around this limit. Each of the runners has a primary weapon mount, and one or more secondary weapon mounts, along with a shield and generator bay. Primary weapons are mounted on the head of the Runner and most feature twin primary mounts for a pair of guns. Secondary mounts are singular and weapons can be grouped, single, or alternately fired independent of the primary guns.

There are specific sets of primary and secondary weapons, and they are not interchangeable. A set of three laser and three bullet weapons, with two special energy weapons round out the primary weapons. Secondary weapons range from dumb fire rockets, guided missiles and energy cannons to howitzers, mortar cannons and - very late in the game - nuclear missiles.

Energy weapons have a maximum ammo amount (up to 200 in some cases) and recharge when below this number. Bullet weapons however, do not recharge, nor are mid-mission reloads possible. Weapons can sometimes be picked up off the battlefield, at the expense of dropping the currently selected secondary (or current primary) weapon. One advantage of this is the ability to pick up a weapon too heavy for the Runner to normally use, at the cost of drastically reduced speed.

Missions vary from assaults, infiltrations, recon to defending bases or convoy escorts. Combat is fairly straightforward, with the ability to tilt and pivot the Runners "head" (and sometimes the entire torso) to target enemies not directly ahead of the player. This is especially useful when attempting to take down rather frequent encounters with airborne units.

The two main features are locational damage and deformable terrain. Locational damage applies to all enemy units and buildings, allowing the player to target legs to quickly destroy or disable enemies, to destroying the head, which in most cases is not actually fatal, but has practical or comedic purposes. The basic bipedal walker enemy without its head has no weapons, but it will continue to walk around - blind - bumping into the player or buildings. Deformable terrain is primarily a visual pleasure, with little practical use. However, persistence or clever thinking can reward the player with a tactical advantage. shooting at the edge of a hillside can create a "notch" to fire down onto or up at targets. The biggest deformation possible is the nuclear missile. Accompanied by a white flash, it will not only obliterate almost anything within its wide explosion radius, it also creates a large crater and sends out a shock wave along the ground, using the terrain as a moving "wall". Not only does this serve to trap anyone surviving the blast inside a deep, burning crater, but it can be used as a mountain-destroying device, or to rip a chunk out of just about anything that stands in the player's way. Any terrain deformation can be seen on the game's 3D, real-time map screen.

In total there are 7 Planet Runners available to the player: Gnat, Stormguard, Invader, Warthog, Raptor, Retro, and Shiva. Each class of Runner also has its own onboard computer, with its own voice overs and in some cases, a different view on things. The heavy runners speak in first person ("I have damage to my hull"), where the lighter runners are more formal ("Warning: Damage to hull").

The player is assisted by yet another voiced computer situated in its starship in orbit around the planet. The AINIC(Artificial Intelligence Network Interface Coupler) Mark 3, as it calls itself, provides all mission summaries, briefings and mid-mission updates with a full voiced backing, and is presented as a self-aware computer entity.

The game also includes multiplayer and a mission editor. Multiplayer can support up to 16 players, and a "single player anarchy" mode also includes options for co-op play, custom missions, bots, and playing single player missions with multiple humans, either with the aliens or against them.

== Release ==
Before the game release, a playable "Interactive Preview" was sold in stores. This preview came with a cloudy-red "Interactive Preview" CD-Rom (DOS version) in a standard jewel case, a red manual with, on its front, a small Interplay advertisement "6$ OFF mail-in rebate..." and a promotional "coming this fall" Shattered Steel advertising the full version at $15.95, and a "Get Shattered" back cover with the game plot and screenshots. This demo was not rated at its release (Rating Pending "RP"). Some Interactive Preview discs were defective, rendering working copies very scarce for collectors and fans.

== Reception ==
Reception

Review scores
Publication	Score
GameSpot	6.8/10 (DOS)
Next Generation	3/5 (DOS)
Macworld	3/5

According to BioWare, sales of Shattered Steel had surpassed 170,000 units by late 2002. The game held an aggregate review score of 73% on GameRankings.

Reviewing the MS-DOS version, Tim Soete of GameSpot said that while the plot is interesting, Shattered Steel is more of a mindless action game than MechWarrior 2: 31st Century Combat and does not have the same sense of immersion, though it is still enjoyable. Next Generation similarly described it as "along the lines of Earthsiege II or MechWarrior 2, but without the complexity. It settles for pure action from the minute players climb into their giant robots ..." He too found it enjoyable in spite of its lack of depth or innovation, noting the numerous missions, selection of weapons, and options for networked multiplayer. Macworld's Michael Gowan wrote that Shattered Steel's "visuals are solid (although a few years old at this point), and the play is engaging." While he recommended it to fans of science-fiction simulation games, he argued that the "scope of the game's missions could be more varied".
