= Baldur's Gate (video game) =

1998 video game

- Developer: BioWare
- Publishers: Black Isle Studios; Interplay Entertainment; JP: Sega
- Producer: Ray Muzyka
- Designer: James Ohlen
- Programmer: Scott Greig
- Artist: John Gallagher
- Writers: James Ohlen; Lukas Kristjanson
- Composer: Michael Hoenig
- Series: Baldur's Gate
- Engine: Infinity Engine
- Platforms: Microsoft Windows; Mac OS
- Release: Microsoft Windows: NA: December 21, 1998 (Note: Some later online sources after the game's release point to a November 30, 1998 release date, but sources from the era point to a December 1998 release.); JP: January 30, 1999; EU: January 1999; Mac OS: NA: July 17, 2000
- Genre: Role-playing
- Modes: Single-player, multiplayer

Baldur's Gate is a 1998 role-playing video game developed by BioWare and published by Interplay Entertainment. It is the first game in the Baldur's Gate series and takes place in the Forgotten Realms, a high fantasy campaign setting, using a modified version of the Advanced Dungeons & Dragons (AD&D) 2nd edition rules. It was the first game to use the Infinity Engine for its graphics, with Interplay using the engine for other Forgotten Realms-licensed games, including the Icewind Dale series and Planescape: Torment. The game's story focuses on a player-made character who travels across the Sword Coast alongside a party of companions.

The game received critical acclaim and was credited for revitalizing computer role-playing games. An expansion pack was released titled Tales of the Sword Coast, as were two sequels, Baldur's Gate II: Shadows of Amn (2000) and Baldur's Gate 3 (2023). An enhanced, remastered version of the Infinity Engine was later created as part of Beamdog's Baldur's Gate: Enhanced Edition, the first new release in the franchise in nearly nine years The original Baldur's Gate continues to be referenced as a point of inspiration in many modern role-playing games, and is often cited as one of the best video games ever made.

== Gameplay ==
A screenshot of Baldur's Gate, showcasing the user interface designed by BioWare in order to provide relative ease in playing the game, with the UI template used in other Forgotten Realms-licensed games, such as Icewind Dale. The game relies heavily on plot and dialogue as driving factors behind how it conveys the main story.

Players conduct the game from a top-down isometric third-person perspective, creating a character who travels across pre-rendered locations, taking on quests, recruiting companions to aid them, and combating enemies, while working towards completing the game's main story. A user interface allows a player to move characters and give them actions to undertake, review information on on-going quests and the statistics of characters in their party, manage their inventories, and organize the formation of the party, though the screen does not need to be centered on the characters being controlled and can be moved around with the mouse and keyboard, the latter capable of accessing various player options through keyboard shortcuts. All of the gameplay mechanics were coded to conform to the Advanced Dungeons & Dragons 2nd edition role-playing rules, with the game automatically computing rule intricacies, including tracking statistics and dice rolling. Although the game is conducted in real-time, some elements of the rule set were modified to allow it to feature a pausable real-time mode. This allows players to pause at any time and prepare what actions a character would do, including the ability to set the game to automatically pause at preset points in combat.

For each new playthrough the player can either create a new character, or import one they exported from a previous playthrough. A new character requires the player to determine what their name, gender, race, class, and alignment are, and what ability scores and weapon proficiencies they have. New characters can be multi-class, but must adhere to the restrictions that come from this, in accordance to the 2nd edition rules; for example, a character who is both a cleric and a fighter, may only use weapons of the former class.

The game's main story is divided up into eight parts, featuring a prologue and seven chapters. Each section requires the player to complete a specific task in order to continue. Some areas of the map are not accessible until the player has advanced to a specific chapter. A player may have up to five companions travelling with them in their party, with the player free to decide whom to recruit or dismiss from the party.

The main UI consists of three action bars surrounding the main screen. The first bar consists of a map, journal, character records, their inventories, spellbooks and a clock. The second bar consists of a portrait of each character in the party, their HP, order, and any effects they are experiencing. The third bar provides specific actions per the number of characters being controlled: if a single character is selected, the player has the ability to switch between the weapons the character is wielding, use spells or items, or utilize a character's or piece of equipment's special abilities. If more than one character is selected, the bar displays options to allow them to converse with or attack non-player characters, stop what is being done, or change their formation.

The inventory system allows each character to equip items categorized as: weapons, ammunition, armor, helmets, necklaces, rings, belts, cloaks, feet, or usable. The number of items a character can both equip and carry is affected by their weight limit, which is determined by their Strength ability score; going over this limit will encumber the character causing them to move slowly or prevent them moving altogether until they remove items from their inventory. The system also indicates what equipment a character may not use as defined by their class. This mechanic also determines how many weapon slots they have available; by default, all character have two weapon slots, with an off-hand slot for shields. Some classes allow characters additional weapon slots. Characters may equip three stacks of ammo for ranged weapons (bows, crossbows and slings), and use three different types of usable items (potions, scrolls and wands).

Conversation can be initiated by players selecting a member of the party and clicking on a friendly or neutral NPC. Some conversations are initiated automatically when characters come close to them. Certain NPCs offer services the player can utilize, including buying and selling items and identifying enchanted items. Other useful places include inns where the party can rest in safety to recover lost hit points and memorize spells, as well as temples where characters can pay for healing services, such as resurrecting a dead party member.

Other features that affect gameplay include:

- The ability to customize their character after creation, albeit with some restrictions.
- The ability to change the primary and minor colors used by each character.
- The ability to switch the game's AI on or off, and change what script a character uses.
- Most locations are hidden when first visited but are revealed as the character moves around them. A fog of war effect hides explored areas when the player's characters move away from them.
- A reputation system that tracks the moral actions of the PC and affects how they are perceived, changing if they resolve a problem or commit a crime in the view of witnesses. Higher reputations cause shops to decrease prices, while lower reputations cause shops to increase prices. Lower reputations may also lead to the character being attacked when in town. Companions are also affected by reputation, with evil companions leaving the party, even attacking it, if it is high, and good and neutral companions leaving when it is low. Some side quests also require a minimum reputation to begin. Certain NPCs may also react negatively or positively depending on their alignment and the player's reputation.
- The ability to keep track of in-game time through the changes in lighting and the activity that is occurring. Characters become fatigued after spending a full in-game day, especially after travelling long distances between world map locations, and must rest to recover, either in an inn or camping out in the countryside/within a dungeon.
- Characters can be ambushed when camping out or travelling long distances between world map locations.
- Players can play either in single-player mode, or in multiplayer mode. The latter allows up to six players to work together online with their own created characters.

== Plot ==
=== Setting ===
Baldur's Gate takes place in the world of Ed Greenwood's Forgotten Realms setting, during the year 1368 DR, along the western coast of the continent of Faerûn known as the Sword Coast. The game takes place during a regional iron shortage in which iron weapons and tools begin to corrode and break without explanation, threatening trade and stability throughout the region. The player's journey takes place across a variety of Sword Coast locations, including the library fortress of Candlekeep, the mining town of Nashkel, the village of Beregost, the Cloakwood forest, and the city of Baldur's Gate, one of the region's largest centres of commerce.

The conflict draws the player into the activities of several organisations from the Forgotten Realms setting, including the Iron Throne, a merchantile organization central to the iron crisis; the Flaming Fist, the mercenary company responsible for maintaining order in Baldur's Gate; the Zhentarim; the Red Wizards of Thay; the Harpers; and the mercenary group known as the Chill.

=== Characters ===
The protagonist of Baldur's Gate is an orphan raised in the library fortress of Candlekeep by the mage Gorion, a member of the Harpers. The game has 25 characters who may join the player's party. Imoen, who also grew up in Candlekeep, is a childhood friend of the protagonist and the first party member to join. Several are encountered in pairs: Jaheira, a half-elven warrior druid and Harper who was a friend of Gorion, travels with her husband Khalid, a nervous but capable fighter; Minsc, an eccentric Rashemi ranger who treats his hamster Boo as a "miniature giant space hamster", seeks to rescue Dynaheir, the Rashemi witch he is sworn to protect; Montaron and Xzar are a pair of Zhentarim agents who have been dispatched to investigate the iron crisis in the Sword Coast region; the manipulative bard Eldoth schemes to elope with Skie Silvershield, the sheltered daughter of one of Baldur's Gate's Dukes sitting on its ruling Council of Four.

Other recruitable companions include Ajantis Ilvastarr, a young paladin of the Order of the Most Radiant Heart sent to combat the increased bandit activity on the Sword Coast; Alora, a cheerful halfling thief encountered while robbing Baldur's Gate's Hall of Wonders; Branwen, a priest of the war god Tempus who may be freed after being turned to stone by the mage Tranzig; Coran, an elven fighter and thief encountered hunting wyverns in the Cloakwood; Edwin Odesseiron, an arrogant Red Wizard of Thay who seeks the protagonist's help in killing Dynaheir; Faldorn, a member of the militant Shadow Druids; Garrick, a young bard and former member of a travelling troupe; Kagain, a dwarven mercenary who operates a caravan escort business in Beregost; Kivan, an elven ranger pursuing the bandit leader Tazok, who was responsible for the death of his partner Deheriana.; Quayle, an arrogant gnome cleric and illusionist who considers himself intellectually superior to those around him; Safana, a thief and former pirate from Calimport; Shar-Teel, an aggressive warrior with a particular hatred of the Flaming Fist; Tiax, a gnome cleric and thief devoted to the evil god Cyric who believes he is destined to rule the world; Viconia deVir, a drow cleric of Shar who has fled the Underdark and is persecuted because of her race; Xan, a pessimistic elven Greycloak mage from Evereska sent to investigate the iron shortage; and Yeslick Orothiar, a dwarven fighter and cleric whose ancestral mine in the Cloakwood has been taken over by the Iron Throne after he was betrayed by Rieltar.

The principal antagonist of Baldur's Gate is Sarevok, the foster son of Rieltar Anchev, the leader the Iron Throne who is bent on monopolizing the iron and weapons trade in the Sword Coast. Other characters involved in the Iron Throne conspiracy include Mulahey, a priest of Cyric overseeing the sabotage of the Nashkel mines; the half-ogre Tazok, who commands the bandits disrupting trade on the Sword Coast; and Tamoko, Sarevok's lover, who later undermines him by supplying information to Gorion's Ward. The Flaming Fist is represented by its commander Eltan, one of the Dukes of Baldur's Gate, Eltan's lieutenant Scar, and Angelo Dosan, a corrupt officer who is Shar-Teel's father and is secretly allied with Sarevok.

Several characters originated in the wider Forgotten Realms setting. These include Cadderly Bonaduce, the priest and Chosen of Deneir; Drizzt Do'Urden, who can be encountered in the wilderness; Elminster, who periodically advises the protagonist; Thalantyr, a wizard who lives at High Hedge outside Beregost; Ardenor Crush, the hobgoblin commander of the Chill.; and the traveller and author Volothamp "Volo" Geddarm.

Biff the Understudy is a fallback character created for the game's conversation system. If dialogue requires a character who is no longer present, Biff appears in the missing character's place and delivers the requisite lines, preventing the game from crashing and allowing critical dialogue to continue. Former BioWare developer Mark Darrah later explained that he created Biff as a backup for the game's dialogue system.

=== Story ===
The story of Baldur's Gate begins when Gorion abruptly instructs his Ward to leave Candlekeep without explanation. That night, the pair are ambushed by a mysterious armored warrior and his followers, who demand that Gorion surrender his Ward. Gorion refuses and is killed while allowing the Ward to escape. The Ward then begins investigating the iron shortage and increased bandit activity affecting the Sword Coast.

Travelling south to the mines of Nashkel, the party discovers that the region's iron ore is being deliberately contaminated. The saboteurs are connected to the bandits attacking caravans throughout the region, and both groups are working on behalf of the Iron Throne. The Ward traces the bandits to their camp and then to a mining operation in the Cloakwood, where the organisation is producing uncontaminated iron while rival supplies deteriorate. After disrupting the Cloakwood operation, the party travels to Baldur's Gate and investigates the Iron Throne's headquarters. They learn that several of its leaders have traveled to Candlekeep for an important meeting, prompting the Ward to return to their former home. While investigating the citadel, the Ward discovers a letter from Gorion revealing that they are one of the Bhaalspawn, mortal offspring of the dead god Bhaal. The revelation corresponds with a prophecy by the seer Alaundo that Bhaal's children would spread chaos and ultimately destroy one another.

At Candlekeep, the Ward encounters a man calling himself Koveras, who offers assistance while encouraging suspicion of the Iron Throne's leaders. Soon afterwards, those leaders are murdered and the party is blamed for their deaths. Imprisoned beneath the fortress, they are helped to escape by Tethoril and travel through Candlekeep's catacombs, where they encounter doppelgangers who have infiltrated the citadel. During their escape, they learn that Koveras was Sarevok in disguise and that he was responsible for Gorion's death. Returning to Baldur's Gate, the party finds the city increasingly unstable. Duke Eltan has been poisoned, the Flaming Fist has fallen under Angelo Dosan's influence, and the Ward is wanted for the murders at Candlekeep. The party uncovers the true purpose of the iron crisis: the Iron Throne sabotaged competing supplies while stockpiling usable iron, intending to profit from shortages and tensions between Baldur's Gate and neighbouring Amn. Sarevok has manipulated the crisis further, seeking to escalate those tensions into open warfare.

Sarevok believes that the bloodshed from such a war will strengthen him and enable him to succeed Bhaal as the new God of Murder. After eliminating members of the Iron Throne who threatened his plans, Sarevok moves to seize political power directly, arranging the poisoning of Eltan and an assassination attempt against another of Baldur's Gate's Dukes while positioning himself to join the Council of Four. The Ward and their companions enter the Ducal Palace during Sarevok's coronation and expose his conspiracy. Sarevok escapes into the ruins beneath Baldur's Gate, where the party pursues him to an ancient temple of Bhaal. After Sarevok and his remaining followers are defeated, his soul leaves his body and travels to an underground chamber containing statues representing the other Bhaalspawn, one of which crumbles following his death.

== Development and release ==
Baldur's Gate began development in 1995 by Canadian game developer BioWare, a company founded by Ray Muzyka, Greg Zeschuk, Trent Oster, his brother Brent, Zeschuk's cousin Marcel, and Augustine Yip. The game was initially titled Forgotten Realms. The game had an estimated budget of $1 million. According to Muzyka, their head programmer read all Forgotten Realms books, including the short stories and the paperbacks, to immerse himself into that setting. The game required 90 man-years of development, which was spent simultaneously creating the game's content and the BioWare Infinity Engine. The primary script engine for the game (used mainly as a debugging tool) was Lua. DirectDraw was used for the graphics. Wasteland was a major influence on Baldur's Gate, particularly its design philosophy of having more than one possible method to achieve each goal.

Unusually for the time, the graphics were not built from tiles; each background was individually rendered, which greatly extended the amount of time needed to create the game. At the time that the game was shipped, none of the sixty-member team had previously participated in the release of a video game. The time pressure to complete the game led to the use of simple areas and game design. Ray Muzyka said that the team held a "passion and a love of the art" and they developed a "collaborative design spirit". He believes that the game was successful because of the collaboration with Interplay.

According to writer Luke Kristjanson, the character of Imoen was a late addition to fill a "non-psychotic-thief gap in the early levels". Kristjanson assembled Imoen's lines by "editing voice-over" for a guard character named Pique from an unused demo, and explained that her lack of voiced dialogue or standalone interactions with other party members throughout the game was due to budgetary constraints. The wife of Dean Anderson, a team member, was the basis for Imoen's facial features as depicted in her character portrait.

Baldur's Gate was released on December 21, 1998, and was published by Black Isle Studios, an internal division of Interplay. The Macintosh version was released by Graphsim Entertainment on July 17, 2000.

In 2009, a novelization of the game by Philip Athans was published.

In 2000 Baldur's Gate was re-released along with its expansion as Baldur's Gate Double Pack, and again in 2002 as a three CD collection entitled Baldur's Gate: The Original Saga. In 2002, the game and its expansion were released along with Icewind Dale, Icewind Dale: Heart of Winter and Planescape: Torment as the Black Isle Compilation. In 2004, it was re-released, this time along with Icewind Dale II, in Part Two of the compilation. Atari published the Baldur's Gate 4 in 1 Boxset including all four games on a combination of DVDs and CDs.

Baldur's Gate and its expansion were released digitally on Good Old Games (later GOG.com) on September 23, 2010. It has also been made available via GameStop App as part of the D&D Anthology: The Master Collection, which also includes the expansion Baldur's Gate: Tales of the Sword Coast, Baldur's Gate II: Shadows of Amn, Baldur's Gate II: Throne of Bhaal, Icewind Dale, Icewind Dale: Heart of Winter, Icewind Dale: Trials of the Luremaster, Icewind Dale II, Planescape: Torment, and The Temple of Elemental Evil.

A remastered and expanded edition of the original game, entitled Baldur's Gate: Enhanced Edition, was released in 2012, developed by Overhaul Games. The game was released for Microsoft Windows, iOS, Mac OS X, Android and Linux.

Skybound Games, a division of Skybound Entertainment, brought Baldur's Gate: Enhanced Edition to the PlayStation 4, Xbox One, and Nintendo Switch in 2019.

== Reception ==
=== Sales ===
According to Feargus Urquhart, Interplay's commercial forecasts for Baldur's Gate were "very low". He noted that the publisher's headquarters in Britain predicted zero sales in that region. Lifetime projections for the German market were "no more than 50,000" copies, as reported by Udo Hoffman of PC Player. Internally, BioWare's worldwide sales goal was 200,000 units, a number that PC Zone's Dave Woods said would "justify work on the sequel". The game instead became an unexpected commercial hit. Ray Muzyka attributed this success in part to the Dungeons & Dragons license, and to the team's decision to use fan feedback during development, which he felt had increased the game's mass-market appeal.

Following its shipment to retailers on December 21, Baldur's Gate began to sell at a "phenomenal rate", according to Mark Asher of CNET Gamecenter. He wrote at the time that its "first run of 50,000 copies sold out immediately and Interplay's elves are working hard to get more games to the stores". The title debuted in the United States at #3 on PC Data's computer game sales rankings for the week ending on January 2, 1999. It sold-through 55,071 copies in the country by the end of 1998, for revenues of $2.56 million. In its second week, Baldur's Gate rose to #2 in the United States. Internationally, it debuted at #1 on Media Control's computer game charts for the German market in the first half of January 1999, and reached first place on Chart-Track's equivalent for the United Kingdom by its second week. According to Interplay, Baldur's Gate also took #1 on the charts in Canada and France. Its global sales reached 175,000 units by mid-January 1999, a sales rate that the Los Angeles Times reported as Interplay's fastest ever. This performance led to a stock-price increase for the company.

In the United States, Baldur's Gate remained in PC Data's weekly top 3 from January 10 through February 6. It claimed #1 for January, with sales of 80,500 copies and revenues of $3.6 million in the country that month. Supply shortages continued throughout much of January. The game likewise secured Media Control's #1 position for the entirety of that month, and held at #1 for the United Kingdom in its third week. Baldur's Gate subsequently took #4 for February in the German market and #3 in the United States, after holding in the latter country's weekly top 10 from February 7 – March 6. By mid-February, Gamecenter reported sales of 450,000 units for Baldur's Gate, which Asher called "the biggest hit Interplay has had since Descent" and a rebuttal to the common belief that role-playing games were commercially moribund. Worldwide sales totaled more than 500,000 copies by the end of that month. Despite these figures, Interplay posted a loss of $16 million for the fourth quarter of 1998, and of $28 million for the year. Brian Fargo attributed the losses in part to Baldur's Gate: he wrote that it "did not ship until the last days of 1998, which reduced shipments in the quarter to about half the projected volume".

Baldur's Gate maintained its unbroken streak in PC Data's weekly top 10 through the week ending March 27, after which it was absent. It then took seventh for March, and was absent from the United States' monthly top 20 by April. However, it held in Chart-Track's British top 20 during April, after 13 weeks; and in Media Control's top 10 and top 20 during the second halves of March, April and May. Baldur's Gate's sales in the German market during its initial months reached 90,000 units, a success for the region. By the end of May 1999, it received a "Gold" award from the Verband der Unterhaltungssoftware Deutschland (VUD), for sales of at least 100,000 units across Germany, Austria and Switzerland. Coinciding with the release of the Tales of the Sword Coast expansion pack in the United States, Baldur's Gate returned to PC Data's top 10 for a week in May. Thereafter, it became a staple of the firm's monthly top 20 from May through August.

Interplay reported worldwide sales of nearly 700,000 copies for Baldur's Gate by June, and it was the United States' second-best-selling computer game during the first half of 1999, behind SimCity 3000. As of September, it had sold above 300,000 units and earned roughly $15 million in revenues in the country during 1999 alone. A writer for PC Accelerator remarked that this success "created an almost audible sigh of relief from publisher Interplay". By November 1999, Baldur's Gate had sold roughly 1 million units worldwide. It claimed ninth place for 1999 in the United States, with a total of 356,448 sales that year. At $15.7 million in revenue, it was the country's seventh-highest-grossing computer game of 1999.

Sales of Baldur's Gate continued in 2000: by March, it had surpassed 500,000 copies sold in the United States, which led Desslock of GameSpot to describe the title as an "undisputed commercial blockbuster". U.S. sales had risen to 600,000 units by April 2001, while global sales totaled 1.5 million copies that May. The game proceeded to sell 83,208 units in the United States from February 2001 through the first week of November alone. Worldwide, Baldur's Gate ultimately surpassed 2.2 million sales by early 2003. The game sold about 2.8 million copies by 2015. By 2006, total sales for all releases in the series was almost five million copies.

=== Reviews and awards ===
Reception

Aggregate scores
Aggregator	Score
GameRankings	92%
Metacritic	91/100

Review scores
Publication	Score
Computer Games Strategy Plus	5/5
Computer Gaming World	4/5
EP Daily	9/10
GameSpot	9.2/10
IGN	9.4/10
Maximum PC	9/10
Next Generation	5/5
PC Gamer (US)	94/100

Baldur's Gate received positive reviews from virtually every major computer gaming publication that reviewed it. At the time of the game's release, PC Gamer US said that Baldur's Gate "reigns supreme over every RPG currently available, and sets new standards for those to come". Computer Shopper called it "clearly the best Advanced Dungeons & Dragons (AD&D) game ever to grace a PC screen". Maximum PC magazine compared the gameplay to Diablo, but noted its more extensive selection of features and options. The pixel-based characters were panned, but the reviewer stated that "the gloriously rendered backgrounds make up for that shortcoming". The main criticism was of the problems with the path finding algorithm for non-player characters. Despite this, the game was deemed an "instant classic" because of the amount of customization allowed, the "fluid story lines", and the replayability. The reviewer from Pyramid felt that the "basic buzz was positive" surrounding the development of the game. The "actual results are a mixed bag, but there's real promise for the future" thanks to the inclusion of the Infinity Engine.

Baldur's Gate was awarded "PC Role-Playing Game of the Year" by the Academy of Interactive Arts & Sciences during the 2nd Annual Interactive Achievement Awards. The game also won computer role-playing game awards by the Academy of Adventure Gaming Arts & Design, Computer Gaming World, the Game Developers Conference, Computer Games Strategy Plus, IGN, CNET Gamecenter, The Electric Playground, RPG Vault, PC Gamer US and GameSpot. IGN, Computer Games and RPG Vault also presented it with their overall "Game of the Year" awards. The editors of Computer Games wrote that Baldur's Gate "delivers everything you could ask for in a computer game".

Baldur's Gate was #3 on CBR's 2020 "10 Of The Best DnD Stories To Start Off With" list — the article states that "beyond giving some insight on the Sword Coast, the game also provides a diverse cast of characters that your character can recruit into their party. This cast of character serves as a great source of inspiration to make interesting player characters".

== Legacy ==
"Just how big was Interplay's role-playing game Baldur's Gate? Big enough to almost single-handedly revitalize the traditional RPG genre. Big enough to keep Interplay shareholders at least moderately appeased. And apparently big enough to spur new titles based on both its engine ... and its retail success".

— Gordon Goble of CNET Gamecenter in 1999

According to IGN, Baldur's Gate did much to revive the role-playing video game genre. John Harris of Gamasutra wrote that it "rescued computer D&D from the wastebasket". GameSpy said that Baldur's Gate was a "triumph" that "single-handedly revived" the computer role-playing game and "almost made gamers forgive Interplay for Descent to Undermountain". IGN ranked Baldur's Gate number five on their list of "The Top 11 Dungeons & Dragons Games of All Time" in 2014. Baldur's Gate set the standard for other games using AD&D rules, especially those developed by BioWare and Black Isle Studios: Planescape: Torment (1999), Icewind Dale (2000), and Icewind Dale II (2002).

Phil Savage of PC Gamer praised Bioware's level design for the titular city in Baldur's Gate, stating that "Baldur's Gate feels vast, exciting and dangerous—just like a proper city". Writing for Gamesradar, Lorenzo Veloria cited Baldur's Gate as an influence on video games like Pillars of Eternity. Scholarly analysis of Baldur's Gate has examined the game's use of party members as part of its approach to computer role-playing game storytelling. Rather than serving only as combat units, companions provide distinct personalities, viewpoints and conflicts that shape the player's experience through dialogue and party interactions.

Baldur's Gate was the first game in the Baldur's Gate series. It was followed by the expansion pack Tales of the Sword Coast (1999), then the sequel Baldur's Gate II: Shadows of Amn (2000) and its expansion pack Throne of Bhaal (2001). In 2023, Baldur's Gate 3 developed by Larian Studios left early access and saw a full release on 3 August 2023.
