= Ojarumaru series 2 =

Ojarumaru
- Series 2
- No. of episodes: 90

Release
- Original network: NHK
- Original release: April 5 – November 26, 1999

Series chronology
- ← Previous; Series 1 Next → Series 3

The second series of the Ojarumaru anime series aired from April 5 to November 26, 1999, on NHK for a total of 90 episodes.

The series' opening theme is "Utahito" (詠人) by Saburō Kitajima. The ending theme is "Purin de ojaru" (プリンでおじゃる Pudding) by Yuriko Fuchizaki, Rie Iwatsubo, and Hiroko Konishi.

The series was released on VHS by Nippon Crown across fifteen volumes, each containing 6 episodes, from July 23 to December 1, 1999. Nippon Crown later released the series on DVD across two compilation volumes, each containing 10 selected episodes, simultaneously on November 21, 2002. The first volume contains episodes 92, 99, 104, 106 through 109, 116, 120, and 121. The second volume contains episodes 123, 128, 146, 149, 151, 156, 161, 162, 168, and 169.

== Episodes ==
No.	Title	Original release date
91	"The Scepter is Testy"	April 5, 1999
The scepter is forced to choose between the Oni Child Trio and Ojarumaru. It picks Ojarumaru, but he works it so hard, it leaves home. Kazuma, Ojarumaru and Denbo go look for it.
92	"The Oni Child Apprenticing"	April 6, 1999
The Oni Child Trio become the pupils of a poet, Kobayashi Tea, so they can challenge Ojarumaru with a poem. They challenge Ojarumaru and find out he reads a different kind of poem.
93	"Ojaru Goes to a Haunted House"	April 7, 1999
Ojarumaru, Kazuma, Denbo and Kin-chan go to a haunted house and run into Usui. The Oni Child Trio show up but Usui scares them away.
94	"Denbo and the Ohagi"	April 8, 1999
Denbo falls in love with an ohagi, Ohagi-chan, at a sweet stand. The manager changed its looks and name for a new season. Ken who works there tells Denbo that Ohagi-chan has left, so he won't be hurt.
95	"The Performance Seller is Fun"	April 9, 1999
Ojarumaru finds a performance seller, Oshino, in a street. Ojarumaru gets more popular with a crowd, so Oshino challenges him, but gets beaten.
96	"Go Forward, Mechanical Laundry Doll"	April 12, 1999
Tommy invents the Mechanical Laundry Doll to do the laundry for him, but it gets out of control.
97	"A Love Letter to Akane"	April 13, 1999
The frustrated Great King Enma sends Green Oni to see the Oni Child Trio. Green Oni finds Akane and writes her a love letter, but decides to go back without seeing her. Green Oni goes back without his mission accomplished.
98	"N/A"	April 14, 1999
The Oni Child Trio chase Kazuma, Ojarumaru and Denbo into a cemetery. A tomb talks to Kazuma there.
99	"The Twin Dogs Fight"	April 15, 1999
The twin dogs at Mangan Shrine fight one another over whether to let the God of Poverty go or not to save the shrine. Nikorinbou insists on keeping the god and Okorinbou gives in.
100	"Ojaru Plays With the Poverty God"	April 16, 1999
Ojarumaru is bored and decides to play, using the God of Poverty. He attaches the god to everyone in town and depresses them.
101	"Denbo Grumbles"	April 19, 1999
Denbo eats vegetables pickled in sake lees and gets drunk. He makes honest comments on Ojarumaru and upsets him, but chases away the Oni Child Trio.
102	"The Fake Scepter Appears"	April 20, 1999
Great King Enma sends a fake scepter to replace the scepter in Ojarumaru's possession. The fake scepter tries to take the scepter into going back to the Heian era, but the scepter insists on staying with Ojarumaru.
103	"N/A"	April 21, 1999
Ai and Kazuma go shopping leaving Makoto and Ojarumaru at home. Makoto and Ojarumaru enjoy their absence at first, but they realize they can't do anything without them.
104	"Ojaru Plays Golf"	April 22, 1999
Ojarumaru tries golf with Kin-chan, but he can't hit the ball. He finally uses the scepter and makes a good shot.
105	"Find Cold Tessai"	April 23, 1999
Cold Tessai gets jealous of popular Kimi-chan and disappears. Ojarumaru takes his place, but he doesn't translate Kimi-chan's fortune-telling correctly and loses customers. Kimi-chan goes to find Cold Tessai.
106	"Yoshiko Tanaka's Treasure Mountain"	April 26, 1999
Ojarumaru follows Yoshiko Tanaka to an old house with many unwanted items. He picks up a spoon and Yoshiko tricks him into exchanging it for a broken fan.
107	"The Master is Nervous"	April 27, 1999
Honda-sensei and Usui come over to Mike's café and surprise everyone. Because Tommy's not there, Mike cannot become Coffee Mask and gets nervous.
108	"Oja-Derella"	April 28, 1999
Kazuma and Ojarumaru read a book, Oja-Derella. In the story, Oja-Derella drops her scepter on the way back from the ball at Prince Kazuma's castle. The prince finds the princess and they live happily ever after.
109	"N/A"	April 29, 1999
Yoshiko Tanaka goes to Mangan Shrine for stocking. She finds a chest of drawer used by the God of poverty there. She exchanges it for many items for the God of Poverty, and the god gets to stay at the shrine for a long time.
110	"The Oni Child's Return Home"	April 30, 1999
Great King Enma tries to bring back the Oni Child Trio to give them a break. The Oni Child Trio are afraid and try to make a scepter on Ojarumaru's idea in vain.
111	"Okame Transforms"	May 3, 1999
Princess Okame does a makeover at Komachi's salon to impress Ojarumaru. Ojarumaru doesn't like any of her new hairdos.
112	"N/A"	May 4, 1999
When Otome-sensei is having a problem with getting the heart of a "Chestnut and Nut Cracker," Tommy comes up with a new wind-up doll. The doll helps Otome-sensei dance for her performance.
113	"N/A"	May 5, 1999
Ojarumaru fights with Kazuma, jumps out of the apartment and goes to see Kinchan. He asks Kinchan to be his older brother, but he realizes he should be the older brother. Kazuma ends up getting another younger brother in the end!
114	"Stuffed Town"	May 6, 1999
Tommy gives away his wind-up dolls, and the Oni Child Trio give away their old costumes at a flea market, but they eventually come back for different reasons.
115	"Tommy's Memories"	May 7, 1999
Tommy remembers his wife Sally and his youth with Ojarumaru.
116	"N/A"	May 10, 1999
Ojarumaru learns about mail and wants to get some, so he exchanges a piece with Tommy. He gets frustrated because it takes a long time to get mail from him, but he eventually gets it and he's content.
117	"Smiling Moonlight Town"	May 11, 1999
Usui's poor and depressing portraits of people drive people to smile more.
118	"The Moonlight Town Tiny Things Club"	May 12, 1999
Ojarumaru gets jealous of Kazuma's family being in clubs, so he decides to make one with other small ones.
119	"Flowers and Lines"	May 13, 1999
Kazuma, Ojarumaru and Denbo visit newlyweds Honda-sensei and Asako. Their house is filled with flower-patterned stuff. Ojarumaru finds out none of them like them. They decide to switch to straight lines.
120	"Kin-chan Mama is a Skillful Laundry"	May 14, 1999
Kazuma, Ojarumaru, Denbo and Kin-chan go into Kin-chan's yard and lose their way. So do the Oni Child Trio.
121	"Ojaru Goes to the Sea"	May 17, 1999
Ken drives Ojarumaru, Denbo, Kazuma, Kin-chan and Komachi to the sea and they have a good time on the beach.
122	"Denbo and the Dandelion"	May 18, 1999
Denbo falls in love with a dandelion, but the dandelion goes away as seeds.
123	"Hoshino Again"	May 19, 1999
Hoshino invites Ojarumaru, Kazuma and Denbo to his spaceship. Hoshino's parents want Earth, so they try to ask Ojarumaru for it, but they're too shy to ask.
124	"Save Tsukkii"	May 20, 1999
The long spell of dry weather dries up the Moonlight Pond where Tsukkii lives. Ojarumaru and the others successfully start rain with Ojarumaru's "rain dance".
125	"Enma Becomes Kisuke"	May 21, 1999
Having lost patience, Great King Enma takes Kisuke's body with a magic spell and tries to get the scepter back from Ojarumaru. He finds out the Oni Child Trio are not doing a bad job.
126	"N/A"	May 24, 1999
After Ojarumaru and Denbo see Kazuma's family rush in the morning, they go out looking for relaxation. Okorinbou and Nikorinbou come along looking for "plenty". Poverty-chan's sewing service brings them money. They all get what they wanted back at the shrine.
127	"N/A"	May 25, 1999
Ojarumaru's poems depress Moonlight Town's symbol, a maple tree. The townies decorate the tree to raise its spirit on Tree Day. The town blacks out in the evening, but Denbo brings his family to light up the tree.
128	"The Performance Seller Doll Ukkun"	May 26, 1999
Performance seller, Oshino, comes back to Moonlight Town to revenge on Ojarumaru. He brings a doll for ventriloquism, Ukkun. Ojarumaru believes Ukkun is alive and cries.
129	"Moonlight Soba Creation"	May 27, 1999
Kii-chan tries soba for the first time and loves it, so he comes up with Moonlight Soba with the help of Tommy for the noodle joint he runs with Tatsu-chan.
130	"Ojaru Turns Up to Stick"	May 28, 1999
Makoto gives Ojarumaru a couple of stickers. Ojarumaru loves them and puts them on all over the apartment. Kazuma gets angry and Ojarumaru goes out looking for stickers. Coffee Mask gives him a box full of compresses and Ojarumaru puts them on old people's bodies and they appreciate it.
131	"The Mangan Shrine Sparkles"	May 31, 1999
The God of Fortune comes to the Mangan Shrine and turns the shrine shiny, but she turns out to be lazy and stingy, and has no taste, so Okorinbou kicks her out.
132	"Thank You, Papa"	June 1, 1999
Komachi's father worries over Komachi's future.
133	"N/A"	June 2, 1999
Ai tries to cook the foreign dish she learned in a cooking class for her family, but fails many times and they all get hungry.
134	"Denbo Masters Mimicry 2"	June 3, 1999
Denbo masters mimicry again, but he forgets his own voice again.
135	"Marching! Tiny Things Club"	June 4, 1999
Kin-chan's carp, Paku-chan, swallowed his mother's stuff. The members of Moonlight Town's Tiny Things Club go into Paku-chan's mouth and look for it.
136	"Cold Tessai Confides a Fortune"	June 7, 1999
Kimi-chan's fortune-telling is very accurate and Cold Tessai asks her where his destiny lady is.
137	"Ojaru Lends the Scepter"	June 8, 1999
The Oni Child Trio try to get the scepter back from Ojarumaru in exchange for many gifts from Great King Enma. Okorinbou and Nikorinbou need money to renovate the shrine, so they try to do it feeling guilty.
138	"The Fair-Skinned Mr. Kanbutsu"	June 9, 1999
Ojarumaru and Denbo visit a grocery store and meet the owner, Mr. Kanbutsu. He explains to them how great dried food is.
139	"Ms. Usui and Mr. Kanbutsu"	June 10, 1999
Mr. Kanbutsu and Usui run into each other at Oni Mountain and hit it off.
140	"A Happy Red Thread Telephone"	June 11, 1999
King Enma sends Green Oni to check on the Oni Child Trio once again. Green Oni comes up with a way to communicate with Akane by a thread telephone.
141	"Ojaru Makes Pottery"	October 4, 1999
Tommy takes Ojarumaru, Kazuma and Denbo to Oni Mountain to see his old friend and a genius potter, Tazan. Tazan loves Ojarumaru's work and wants to take him on as his pupil.
142	"The Meal Snack Came Back"	October 5, 1999
Tommy, Kazuma, Ojarumaru and Denbo go on a picnic. They follow the rice balls Denbo dropped into a cave. They run into Tazan and he tells them he ate Denbo's rice balls. Tazan gives them two boxes of goodies.
143	"Ojaru Slips the Mouth"	October 6, 1999
Princess Okame visits Ojarumaru on Doll's Festival. Ojarumaru gives her a cold shoulder at first, but he sees the boys in Kazuma's class get friendly with her, and changes his mind.
144	"Ken Becomes a Popular Person"	October 7, 1999
Ken starts working for Yoshiko Tanaka's store and puts on a hero costume. He gets popular among kids, but as soon as he takes off the costume, he loses his popularity.
145	"Ms. Usui Becomes a Heroine"	October 8, 1999
Ken tells Usui if she's trying to be a comic book artist, she should have enough dream to share with the readers. Usui tries to be a heroine of a girl comic book and imitate Otome-sensei, but realizes she's fine the way she is.
146	"Ojaru Goes to an Island"	October 11, 1999
Ojaumaru's taken away on Tsukkii's back to the middle of a pond with the Oni Child Trio. They try to escape together.
147	"The Testimony Rock of Love"	October 12, 1999
Kin-chan's father picks up a diamond ring for his wife on their wedding anniversary. Kazuma suggests he pick "an ordinary rock" to get across his love to his wife better.
148	"It's Moonlight Town, Nephew"	October 13, 1999
Denbo's nephew, Denbo Gorō, visits Denbo in Moonlight Town. He falls in love with Akemi, but finds out Akemi is Denbo's girlfriend.
149	"The Director and the Ghost"	October 14, 1999
Marie hears weird sound in her house and calls Tommy for help. The Haunted House Director shows up and tells her that her attic is haunted by ghosts. He tells them that he'd make the ghosts leave, but he keeps them in one of the rooms in Marie's backyard in which he starts living as a tenant.
150	"Ojaru Enters the Cap"	October 15, 1999
Ojarumaru goes into the cap and gets big. He realizes it's not as great being big as he thought it was.
151	"Rainy Day Sugoroku"	October 18, 1999
Because it's raining outside, Kazuma, Ojarumaru and Denbo decide to make a game and play Sugoroku. They have a hard time finishing it.
152	"The Mechanical Ojaru Doll"	October 19, 1999
Aobee asks Tommy for help in getting the scepter back from Ojarumaru. Tommy tries to help him with the Mechanical Ojaru Doll.
153	"Figure Collecting"	October 20, 1999
The Haunted House Director likes collecting interesting figure's prints and gets help from Ojarumaru and Denbo to ask the God of Poverty.
154	"Aka Murasaki Comes Over"	October 21, 1999
Ojarumaru's private teacher in the Heian era, Aka Murasaki Shikibu, is coming to see him. Ojaurmaru has to look like he's been studying hard and tries to get help from Kazuma's family.
155	"Okame Saves the World"	October 22, 1999
Princess Okame comes to visit Ojarumaru and runs into Hoshino. Ojarumaru and Princess Okame are invited to Hoshino's house. Hoshino's mother beats Ojarumaru's scepter in arm-wrestling, but Okame beats her and Hoshino's family gives up on taking Earth.
156	"Denbo and the Persimmon"	October 25, 1999
Denbo falls in love with a persimmon which grows more beautiful day by day. One day, the persimmon is dried up.
157	"The Tiny Things Club Newspaper"	October 26, 1999
The Tiny Things Club decide to publish a newspaper to advertise the club.
158	"Ojaru Turns Up to Touch"	October 27, 1999
Ojarumaru gets the urge to touch something that feels good.
159	"N/A"	October 28, 1999
Ojarumaru leans the flavor of dried food from Mr. Kanbutsu.
160	"Aim at the Moonlight Tower"	October 29, 1999
Kazuma, his dad, and Ojarumaru try to get to the Moonlight Tower by the shortcut Kazuma's dad used to take as a child and lose their way.
161	"Kisuke Becomes a Mama"	November 1, 1999
Kisuke warms an egg he found by a pond and the hatched chicks think Kisuke is their mother. Kisuke raises the chicks, but their real mother show up.
162	"The Pudding Way"	November 2, 1999
Ojarumaru teaches Kobayashi Tea the right way of eating pudding.
163	"Sound Play"	November 3, 1999
Ojarumaru gets into playing with sound.
164	"The Youth Mikoshi"	November 4, 1999
The youth in Moonlight Town gather and form a Mikoshi for a festival. They finish it and carry it around the town, but cat gangs attack them.
165	"Tsukkii's Return Home"	November 5, 1999
Kin-chan's dad gives Kin-chan a mecha-dinosaur, and Kin-chan loses Tsukkii at the Moonlight Pond. Kin-chan misses Tsukii so much, he goes back to look for it.
166	"Cold Tessai Dating"	November 8, 1999
Cold Tessai goes out on a date with Usui.
167	"Mama is a Literary Master"	November 9, 1999
Ai learns her old classmate in high school had her book published, and gets motivated to write.
168	"N/A"	November 10, 1999
Kazuma's parents over who Kazuma looks like and try to find out.
169	"Cow Comes"	November 11, 1999
Cow comes to visit Ojarumaru with the help of the witch in the forest. Cow gets to give a gift to Ojarumaru, but it leaves before Ojarumaru gets to feed pudding to it.
170	"N/A"	November 12, 1999
Ojarumaru points out that Kisuke has been treated unfairly in the Oni Child Trio and the oni try to fix things.
171	"The Good Scent Trip"	November 15, 1999
Ojarumaru goes out to the town to smell different scents and ends up at Tommy's house.
172	"Viva! Sumo Wrestling"	November 16, 1999
The kids do a sumo wrestling tournament. Kin-chan and Aobee fight a good final.
173	"The Night of Moonlight Town"	November 17, 1999
Honda-sensei, the Haunted House Director, and Mr. Kawakami make rounds of Moonlight Town at night and find out a moonlight is happening.
174	"Ojaru and the Mechanical Doll"	November 18, 1999
Tommy sends the Mechanical Ojaru Doll to Kazuma's house, and Ojarumaru and the doll make friends with each other.
175	"N/A"	November 19, 1999
Kazuma's family go to a newly-opened hand-rotary sushi bar, and Ojarumaru can't get pudding.
176	"The Twin Dogs' Hobby"	November 22, 1999
Nikorinbou's secret hobby which is to collect tiny things is revealed. Then Nikorinbou finds out Okorinbou's secret hobby.
177	"Iwashimizu-kun Loosens Up"	November 23, 1999
Iwashimizu's favorite pet, Kin-chan No. 28, is not well. He finds out the reason is because he's too strict on people at school, so he tries to loosen up.
178	"Yoshiko Continued Waiting"	November 24, 1999
Yoshiko tells kids her old stories while Ojarumaru suspects she made them all up.
179	"Kame-Tome: The Secret of Energy"	November 25, 1999
Kame and Tome reveal the secret to longevity.
180	"Ojaru Returns to the Heian Era"	November 26, 1999
Kazuma gets a fever and a worried Ojarumaru goes back to the Heian era and looks for a medicinal plant with Cow.
