= Ojarumaru series 1 =

Ojarumaru
- Series 1
- DVD cover of the first volume
- No. of episodes: 90

Release
- Original network: NHK
- Original release: October 5, 1998 – February 9, 1999

Series chronology
- Next → Series 2

The first series of the Ojarumaru anime series aired from October 5, 1998, to February 9, 1999, on NHK for a total of 90 episodes.

The series's opening theme is "Utahito" (詠人) by Saburō Kitajima. The ending theme is "Purin Sanka" (プリン賛歌 The Pudding Anthem) by Sus4.

The series was released on VHS by Nippon Crown across fifteen volumes, each containing 6 episodes, from December 16, 1998, to April 21, 1999. Nippon Crown later released the series on DVD across two compilation volumes, each containing 10 selected episodes, simultaneously on September 21, 2002. The first volume contains episodes 1 through 5, 8, 9, 14, 18, and 24. The second volume contains episodes 32, 38, 39, 43, 68, 71, 77, 79, 80, and 90.

== Episodes ==
No.	Title	Original release date
1	"I am Ojarumaru"; Transliteration: "Maro ga Ojarumaru de ojaru" (Japanese: マロがおじゃる丸でおじゃる)	October 5, 1998
One thousand years ago in Fairy World in the Heian era, Ojarumaru Sakanoue is bored with his life. His parents only want him to study so he can become an intellectual aristocrat. One day, he is lured into Enma World by the sound of a ukulele Great King Enma played. Ojarumaru gets Great King Enma's scepter and accidentally falls into the Moonlight Hole, which takes him into Full Moon Road.
2	"The Little Brother Who Came From the Moon"; Transliteration: "Tsuki Kara Otouto Futtekita" (Japanese: 月からおとうとふってきた)	October 6, 1998
Ojarumaru goes through the Full Moon Road to the present day. He meets a young boy named Kazuma, who was wishing for a little brother. The Oni Child Trio from Enma World are ordered by Great King Enma, their father, to get back his scepter from Ojarumaru. He escapes from them and starts living at Kazuma's house with the help of Kazuma's grandfather, Tommy.
3	"Everyone's Just Beginning"; Transliteration: "Minna Hajimete Bakari de ojaru" (Japanese: みんなはじめてばかりでおじゃる)	October 7, 1998
After Ojarumaru spends a night at Kazuma's house, his caretaker, Denbo the Densho-Firefly, comes over. Ojarumaru surprises Kazuma's parents at breakfast with his comments like an aristocrat. The Oni Child Trio, being disguised as deliverers, show up to get back Great King Enma's scepter.
4	"It's Good Going Slow"; Transliteration: "Yukkuri ga Yoi de ojaru" (Japanese: ユックリがよいでおじゃる)	October 8, 1998
Ojarumaru asks Kazuma to show him the town to look for the entrance to the Full Moon Road so he can get home. Riding on Kazuma's back, he asks him to take him to the Moonlight Tower. He gets dizzy when he sees the bus for the first time. When they get off the bus, the Oni Child Trio show up.
5	"Kazuma Likes Rocks Very Much"; Transliteration: "Kazuma wa Tottemo Ishi ga Suki" (Japanese: カズマはとっても石がすき)	October 9, 1998
Since Ojarumaru takes interest in various things in Moonlight Town, Kazuma takes him to his favorite spot where there are a lot of his favorite rocks. The Oni Child Trio watch Kazuma enthusiastically picking up rocks and they think he's collecting weapons to attack them. They also collect stuff and try to attack them.
6	"Grandpa Tommy's Big Discovery"; Transliteration: "Tomī-jī no Daihakken" (Japanese: トミー爺の大発見)	October 12, 1998
The Oni Child Trio left their battle sticks at Enma World. They go out to find new weapons and eventually find a giant fork, spoon, and knife. Later, they come to a historic site where Ojarumaru and Kazuma help Tommy's excavation. The Oni Child Trio attack, but Kisuke falls in a trap hall. Tommy helps Kisuke out of the hole and finds an oni's horn.
7	"My Cap is a Treasure Chest"; Transliteration: "Maro no Eboshi wa Takarabako" (Japanese: マロのエボシは宝ばこ)	October 13, 1998
The bus stop moves just in front of Kazuma's house. But a bus does not come up after a long wait. Someone moved the bus stop that was supposed to be in the middle of a shopping street. Kazuma puts it back and hurries to school. After school, Kazuma finds that the TV set and the fridge are missing. He notices the wires are going into Ojarumaru's tate-eboshi cap. It has fourth dimensional space inside and can contain anything.
8	"I Hate Baths and Water"; Transliteration: "Furo ya Mizu wa Iya de ojaru" (Japanese: 風呂や水はイヤでおじゃる)	October 14, 1998
Ojarumaru hates water, so he does not like baths either. Ai, Kazuma's mother, pushes him into the small bathroom. Then, the Oni Child Trio sneak there to find the scepter in Ojarumaru's clothes. The scepter is not in the prince's clothes. Then, they get into the bathroom and....!
9	"I'm Homesick"; Transliteration: "Hōmushikku de ojaru" (Japanese: ホームシックでおじゃる)	October 15, 1998
Denbo, the messenger, comes back from the Heian era and gives a report to Ojarumaru. The prince gets homesick. Ai makes pudding to cheer him up. Ojarumaru likes it and takes Kazuma's portion. Kazuma pleads his mother to make pudding again.
10	"My Cap is Mysterious"; Transliteration: "Maro no Eboshi wa Fushigi de ojaru" (Japanese: マロのエボシはふしぎでおじゃる)	October 16, 1998
The Oni Child Trio get into Kazuma's house to retrieve the scepter from Ojarumaru. Kisuke searches inside Ojarumaru's cap and is sucked into it. He finds the scepter there. But he falls in a trap before getting to it. He comes out right in front of the cat!
11	"Kin-chan is a Dinosaur Mania"; Transliteration: "Kin-chan wa Kyōryū Mania" (Japanese: 金ちゃんは恐竜マニア)	October 19, 1998
Kazuma introduces Kin-chan to Ojarumaru. Kin-chan is the son of a big apartment owner and Kazuma's classmate. He invites Ojarumaru and Kazuma to his room. It has many toys and dolls of dinosaurs. Then, the Oni Child Trio appear...
12	"Where's My Place?"; Transliteration: "Maro no Ibasho wa Doko de ojaru?" (Japanese: マロの居場所はどこでおじゃる？)	October 20, 1998
Ojarumaru is resting on his set of three pieces: a pedestal, a Byōbu, and an armrest in the toilet! He is dragged out of it by Kazuma and Makoto immediately. He tries to set his three-piece set, but Kazuma's house is not so spacious. Finally he rests on the top of Kazuma's shelves where his stone collection is displayed. Kazuma gets upset and...!
13	"Crazy for Komachi-chan"; Transliteration: "Komachi-chan ni Merorinko" (Japanese: 小町ちゃんにメロリンコ)	October 21, 1998
Kazuma goes to Komachi's hair salon to have his hair cut. Tagging along with Kazuma, Ojarumaru becomes a good friend with Komachi. Komachi hates any kind of bugs, so Denbo is pushed out of the salon. Then, the Oni Child Trio come up, pretending they are customers. But, something seems wrong to Aobee.
14	"Kazuma, Afraid of Rocks"; Transliteration: "Kazuma, Ishi o Kowagaru" (Japanese: カズマ、石をこわがる)	October 22, 1998
Kazuma takes Ojarumaru to the Mangan Shrine just outside town. He talks to Ojarumaru about the sacred dogs made of stone. Suddenly, the Oni Child Trio appear and try to get the scepter from Ojaurmaru. While he dodges them, the shrine is damaged. Then, the stone dogs turn into real ones. They are the guardian deities of this shrine.
15	"Grandpa Tommy's Oni Child Welcome Party"; Transliteration: "Tomī-jī no Kooni Kangeikai" (Japanese: トミー爺の子鬼かんげい会)	October 23, 1998
Tommy, Kazuma's grandfather, plans to have a welcome party for the Oni Child Trio so that everybody becomes a good friend to each other. Kazuma and Ojarumaru help him prepare the party. Tommy tries to invite the Oni Child Trio with a mechanical doll made of many sweet dumplings.
16	"Iwashimizu-kun is Always Correct"; Transliteration: "Itsumo Tadashii Iwashimizu-kun" (Japanese: いつも正しい石清水くん)	October 26, 1998
Iwashimizu, Kazuma's classmate and a committee member, detests anything wrong and is very strict on the rules and regulations. He calls Komachi's attention not to bring a hand mirror to school. Then, Ojarumaru comes to visit the class. The prince gathers an instant popularity of the class. Iwashimizu start to call Ojarumaru attention on his age (too young to come to school), his attire, his words, his cap etc.
17	"Denbo in Love"; Transliteration: "Denbo, Koi o Suru" (Japanese: 電ボ、恋をする)	October 27, 1998
Ojarumaru and his messenger Denbo cannot find any insects in Moonlight Town. When they give up the "hunt of insects", Denbo hears a weak cry and he finally finds a bug. He has a feeling more than friendship to this bug. But, it is a cockroach!
18	"Common Taste is a Hardship"; Transliteration: "Shomin no Aji wa Nangi de ojaru" (Japanese: 庶民の味はナンギでおじゃる)	October 28, 1998
Ojarumaru and Denbo enjoy the sauteed beans brought from their time of the Heian era. The next morning, Ojarumaru finds similar beans on the table, which turns out to be fermented beans. Ojarumaru has never tried it before, so he has no idea how sticky it is. And Ojarumaru covered with bean's threads, ends up struggling and rolling in the room. He is exhausted and takes a nap. Then, the Oni Child Trio come up to take the scepter.
19	"Here Comes Princess Okame"; Transliteration: "Okame-hime ga Yattekita" (Japanese: オカメ姫がやってきた)	October 29, 1998
In the Heian era, Princess Okame has been training to jump into "the time ring" so that she can go to the present day where Ojarumaru is enjoying extraordinary life. It's a full moon tonight. Princess Okame jumps into the Full Moon Road reflecting on King Enma's Rock of Tears. She flies into the present time through the time tunnel...!
20	"The Hardworking Twin Dogs"; Transliteration: "Hatarakimono no Futago Inu" (Japanese: はたらき者の双子犬)	October 30, 1998
The guardian dogs of the half-ruined Mangan Shrine, Okorinbou and Nikorinbou, come to see Ojarumaru. They need money to restore the shrine, so they want to earn some by baby-sitting Ojarumaru. The dogs make almost touching efforts to please the prince. Suddenly, the Oni Child Trio come up on their way.
21	"Ojaru Goes to the Supermarket"; Transliteration: "Ojaru Sūpāmāketto e Iku" (Japanese: おじゃるスーパーマーケットへ行く)	November 2, 1998
Kazuma and Ai take Ojarumaru to a supermarket. The prince is so excited and touches anything one after another. Kazuma is then told by his mother to get some eggs. At the egg corner, Kazuma is surprised to see a huge egg. It is not a real egg but a fake which one of the Oni Child Trio's changed shape.
22	"You're Strong, Densho-Firefly"; Transliteration: "Tsuyoi zo Densho-Botaru" (Japanese: つよいぞ電書ボタル)	November 3, 1998
The Oni Child Trio catches Denbo in a net and wants to exchange him with the scepter. Ojarumaru reluctantly puts out the scepter to the Oni Child Trio. Suddenly, the scepter emits fire and the prince saves Denbo. Denbo is shocked by his failure and helplessness and decides to go back to the Heian era.
23	"Grandma Marie is the Rival"; Transliteration: "Raibaru wa Marī-baachan" (Japanese: ライバルはマリー婆ちゃん)	November 4, 1998
Kazuma and Tommy invite Ojarumaru to see Marie. The prince thinks she is a young girl but she is an old lady living alone in a huge residence. Marie is an ostentatious person like Ojarumaru, or, maybe worse. The prince and Marie show off to each other on any topics. It is endless race of vanity and Kazuma and Tommy get tired of watching them soon.
24	"Mr. Ken the Part-Timer"; Transliteration: "Furītā Ken-san" (Japanese: フリーターケンさん)	November 5, 1998
A young guy is calling customers with loud voice at a fish shop. He is Ken, a self-professed freeman who has been changing jobs one after another to find the vocation. He gets a part-time job at the fish shop. Kazuma likes Ken, but Ojarumaru spits out his usual thorny jokes to Ken. Then, Ken gets in very low spirits.
25	"I Want to Be a Ballerina"; Transliteration: "Barerīna ni Naritai de ojaru" (Japanese: バレリーナになりたいでおじゃる)	November 6, 1998
Ojarumaru and Kazuma meet Otome-sensei who is the instructor of ballet lessons. She has a lesson room in Marie's residence. Ojarumaru falls in love with her beauty and wants to be a ballerina. Maybe it is too early by at least 10 years. The prince is so tiny and is absolutely impossible to ballet. Suddenly the Oni Child Trio disguised as ballerinas, creep up to the prince.
26	"Kisuke Becomes a Chick"; Transliteration: "Kisuke Piyoko ni Naru" (Japanese: キスケひよこになる)	November 9, 1998
Kisuke makes up a plan to inducing Ojarumaru into a trap. But he fails due to his own mistake. Shocked, Kisuke wanders in town and see a bird shop. When he imitates a chirping chick, the hen thinks he is one of her chicks.
27	"The Dark Sachiyo Usui"; Transliteration: "Kurai no Usui Sachiyo" (Japanese: 暗いのうすいさちよ)	November 10, 1998
While Kazuma and Kin-chan play soccer in the park, Ojarumaru meets a lady named Sachiyo Usui. She is aiming to be a comic book writer. Usui likes the appearance and attire of the prince and asks him to be a model of her work.
28	"Tsukkii is a Mysterious Guy"; Transliteration: "Tsukkī wa Nazo na Yatsu" (Japanese: ツッキーはナゾなやつ)	November 11, 1998
Princess Okame comes up again to the present time through the Full Moon Road. She almost falls in the pond, but fortunately she lands on a green creature. Princess Okame sees that Kin-chan has a doll just like this green creature. It is an old doll named Tsukkii coming down from generation to generation at Kin-chan's family. Princess Okame takes Kin-chan, Kazuma and Ojarumaru to the pond.
29	"Telephones Are a Hardship"; Transliteration: "Denwa wa Nangi de ojaru" (Japanese: 電話はナンギでおじゃる)	November 12, 1998
On a rainy day, Ojarumaru and Denbo stay home alone. The Oni Child Trio burst in to retrieve the scepter. In the middle of the struggle, the telephone rings. It startles not only Ojarumaru but also the Oni Child Trio. They have never seen the telephone before. The Oni Child Trio run away. It is confusing for the prince to listen to Kazuma's voice from the machine.
30	"Denbo and Akemi"; Transliteration: "Denbo to Akemi" (Japanese: 電ボとアケミ)	November 13, 1998
When Denbo visits Marie's mansion, he meets a parrot named Akemi. They become friends to each other and make a promise that they will take a fly in the air together one day. But Marie tells Denbo not to see Akemi any more. Ojarumaru comes to help miserable Denbo.
31	"Run! Master"; Transliteration: "Hashire! Masutā" (Japanese: 走れ！マスター)	November 16, 1998
Tommy takes Ojarumaru to a coffee shop run by Mike, the mayor of Moonlight Town. Suddenly, Mike asks Tommy to take care of the shop and rushes out. He has another face called "Coffee Mask". His secret mission is to keep peace in the town.
32	"The Light of Hope for Sachiyo Usui"; Transliteration: "Usui Sachiyo ni Kibou no Hikari" (Japanese: うすいさちよに希望の光)	November 17, 1998
Ken takes a part time job as a delivery man at a soba restaurant. When he delivers a bowl of soba noodles to Sachiyo Usui's apartment, the young comic book writer falls down. She has been working without taking any food and sleep to make the deadline. Ken offers his help, but Usui almost gives up to finish her work in time.
33	"Komachi-chan Sets Her Own Pace"; Transliteration: "Komachi-chan wa Mai Pēsu" (Japanese: 小町ちゃんはマイペース)	November 18, 1998
Kazuma wants to improve the defensive skills of Komachi and Kin-chan. As usual, Komachi comes up very late. Finally Kazuma starts knocking soccer balls to Komachi and Kin-chan, but they can not receive it at all. No wonder - Komachi holds the hand mirror and Kin-chan has candy. Kazuma snatches them out of their hands. Then, the mirror and candy disappear mysteriously.
34	Transliteration: "Kūru ja no Rei Tessai" (Japanese: クールじゃの冷徹斎)	November 19, 1998
At a crossroad in Moonlight Town, a man in black with black glasses runs a small work stand. He is a fortuneteller called Cold Tessai. Ojarumaru and Kazuma ask him to find out what happened in their previous lives, but he says he does not work free. Then three big bear dolls approach. They are the disguised Oni Child Trio.
35	"Great King Enma is Very Much Annoyed"; Transliteration: "Enma Daiō Dai Yowari" (Japanese: エンマ大王大よわり)	November 20, 1998
There is a big castle of Great King Enma in Enma World. The castle is overflowed with the deceased who have not been given their destinations; the heaven or the preaching chamber. Suddenly, Great King Enma's scepter pops back, but Ojarumaru follows it. The prince tells all the deceased that they can go to whichever places they like. Oops! The whole castle turns into turmoil!
36	"Welcome to the Oni Child House"; Transliteration: "Kooni Hasu e Youkoso" (Japanese: 子鬼ハウスへようこそ)	November 23, 1998
On a sunny day, Ojarumaru, Kazuma, Tommy, Kin-chan, and Komachi are enjoying semi-camping in the yard. The prince tells Tommy about the scepter of Great King Enma. He justifies his conducts 100%. The Oni Child Trio retrieves the scepter after Ojarumaru accidentally tosses it up in the air when it got too hot from the grill. Suddenly, it begins to thunder and a scared Kisuke accidentally lets go of the scepter, which allows Ojarumaru to gain possession of it again. A heavy rain shower begins, which ends the semi-camp, and the Oni Child Trio take shelter under a tree. Later, a small robot with a huge umbrella in its hand comes up in front of them.
37	"The Twin Dogs' Human Walk"; Transliteration: "Futago Inu no Ningen Sanpo" (Japanese: 双子犬の人間散歩)	November 24, 1998
Due to the scarce offerings, Okorinbou and Nikorinbou decide to earn some money by themselves. They offer a "ride" on their backs to Ojarumaru and Marie. Unfortunately, the dogs get lost in Moonlight Town.
38	"I Love Slow Clocks"; Transliteration: "Yukkuri Tokei ga Suki de ojaru" (Japanese: ユックリ時計が好きでおじゃる)	November 25, 1998
Interested in the clock ticking the time precisely, Ojarumaru stores it in his cap and is startled when the alarm goes off. Kazuma explains to the prince how a clock works. The prince is shocked to know that the time gets fast, gets slow, or even stops. In his home in the Heian era, the time always goes by regularly.
39	"Cake is Scary!"; Transliteration: "Kēki Kowai! de ojaru" (Japanese: ケーキこわい！でおじゃる)	November 26, 1998
Kazuma takes Ojarumaru to the confectionery shop. He tells the prince that the sweet cakes are as good as pudding. Unfortunately, the shop is closed. The prince begs Kazuma to get a wedding cake in the store window, but Kazuma says that he can not have it unless someone gets married. Ojarumaru asks Kazuma, Usui or anybody to get married immediately.
40	"Iwa Shimizu-kun's Best Friend"; Transliteration: "Iwa Shimizu-kun no Daishinyū" (Japanese: 石清水君の大親友)	November 27, 1998
Iwashimizu hates to waist time. He is also nervous at any sounds when he studies at home. Embarrassed by the loud laughs of his mother and friends, Iwashimizu goes out to take a walk. When he sees Ojarumaru and Kazuma carrying Kin-chan's gold fish, the Oni Child Trio leap at them. The gold fish falls into the river and Iwashimizu dives in the river to get it back.
41	"Moonlight Herb is Best for Health"; Transliteration: "Kenkou Ichiban Gekkousou" (Japanese: 健康いちばん月光草)	November 30, 1998
Moonlight Herb is a unique plant growing in Moonlight Town only. It fully grows up in one night when it is bathed by the moonlight. The Oni Child Trio are surprised when they see Tommy picking Moonlight Herb. It also grows in Enma World and is the most favorite vegetable of Great King Enma. Kisuke tastes it and discovers that his body is filled with energy. Moonlight Herb is healthy food.
42	"Kimi-chan Finds Happiness"; Transliteration: "Kimi-chan Shiawase ni Naru" (Japanese: 公ちゃん幸せになる)	December 1, 1998
Cold Tessai the fortuneteller hires a partner named Kimi-chan the Hamster. Kimi-chan tells convincing fortunes by spinning a wheel. However, she has her own worry, and nobody else but Ojarumaru knows it.
43	"The Best Present of All"; Transliteration: "Saikou no Otodoke Mono" (Japanese: 最高のお届けもの)	December 2, 1998
When Ojarumaru wakes up, nobody is at home. He sees a beautifully wrapped box in the entrance. The prince finds pudding inside and hide it in his cap. Kazuma finds it and accuses Ojarumaru. The prince gets ashamed and walks away from home.
44	"The Capital is Wherever I Sit"; Transliteration: "Maro ga Suwareba Miyako de ojaru" (Japanese: マロが座れば都でおじゃる)	December 3, 1998
While having pudding in front of the apartment, Ojarumaru sees a snail feeling bad on a leaf. He takes it to the park nearby. The snail's name is Katapi and it has been traveling around the world. The Oni Child Trio jump at the prince again for the scepter. He narrowly escapes thanks to the snail's help.
45	"A Storm of Flowers in Moonlight Town"; Transliteration: "Gekkō Chō ni Hanafubiki" (Japanese: 月光町に花ふぶき)	December 4, 1998
It's Flower Day and all the children give flowers to their parents. Kazuma goes to the flower shop where Ken is working temporarily. Marie appears and asks Ken to pay the rent. Ken moved into an apartment behind Marie's mansion. Marie and Ken starts quarreling on trifles.
46	"Who's the Ambassador of Moonlight Town?"; Transliteration: "Gekkō Chō Taishi wa Dare de ojaru?" (Japanese: 月光町大使はだれでおじゃる？)	December 7, 1998
Mike the Coffee Mask is delivering the leaflets of "Moonshine's Ambassador Contest". Komachi decides to enter the contest with no hesitation. She is confident to win. Ojarumaru transforms himself into a girl with the power of the scepter and enters the contest too. Then, the Oni Child Trio come back to retrieve the scepter.
47	"The Prince on a White Dog"; Transliteration: "Shiroinu Notta Oujisama" (Japanese: 白犬にのった王子様)	December 8, 1998
While riding on Okorinbou, Ojarumaru sees two tiny turtles at the pet shop and feels pity. He begs Okorinbou several times and manages to borrow some money from the offering box. Then the prince saves the turtles out of the pet shop. To his astonishment, they are the same turtles living in the pond in the Heian era!
48	"Ojaru Goes Down in History"; Transliteration: "Ojaru Rekishi ni Nokoru" (Japanese: おじゃる、歴史に残る)	December 9, 1998
Grandpa Tommy takes Ojarumaru and Kazuma to a cave. He wants to find a historical painting on the wall. Komachi pops up and ask Kazuma to check her ballet training. Then, the Oni Child Trio charge on to Ojarumaru. Komachi is awkward; ballet steps knock them down like kung-fu kicks. Suddenly the wall falls down and an old painting comes up.
49	Transliteration: "Narabeba Yoi Koto Aru de ojaru" (Japanese: 並べばよいことあるでおじゃる)	December 10, 1998
Ojarumaru sees people standing in a long line in the shopping street. He is told they give out sweet cake. He gets in line but unfortunately the last cake is given out to a lady just in front of him. Then, Ken invites him to the lottery. Although the prince just got a packet of tissue paper, he jumps in when he sees a line of people for anything.
50	Transliteration: "Denbo Gei o Oboeru" (Japanese: 電ボ芸をおぼえる)	December 11, 1998
Denbo comes back through the Full Moon Road from the Heian era. He sees a sparrow practicing "Walk on the tight rope". The sparrow named Chuntarou, is a member of traveling acrobat party. Denbo is invited to the party and comes up with Ojarumaru. They are attacked by the Oni Child Trio and the stage is destroyed. Tommy repairs the stage, but the leader of the party gets sick of hard work.
51	"Kin-chan Fishes for Friends"; Transliteration: "Kin-chan Tomodachi o Tsuru" (Japanese: 金ちゃん友だちを釣る)	December 14, 1998
Kin-chan comes to the Moonlight Pond. He wants to catch Tsukkii despite Kazuma's warning. However, there is no sign of 'pull' for a long time. Being tired of waiting, Kazuma starts playing soccer with Ojarumaru. Then, Kin-chan yells out. He finally catches Tsukkii.
52	"Ojaru Climbs a Mountain"; Transliteration: "Ojaru Yama o Noboru" (Japanese: おじゃる山にのぼる)	December 15, 1998
Kazuma invites Ojarumaru to climb the steep mountain called "Oni Mountain" in Moonlight Town. The prince gets tired soon and Kazuma has to carry the lazy kid on his back. Meanwhile, the Oni Child Trio take a short cut to ambush the prince and Kazuma. But to do so, they have to challenge rock-climbing.
53	"Hot-Blooded Honda-sensei"; Transliteration: "Nekketsu Honda-sensei" (Japanese: 熱血本田先生)	December 16, 1998
Honda-sensei, the teacher of Kazuma's class, is the devoted teacher with jogging being his daily exercise. Honda-sensei meets Kazuma carrying Ojarumaru. He has been curious about the prince, but "not to interfere one's private life" is his motto. Then, the Oni Child Trio pop up to take back the prince's scepter.
54	"God Appears at Mangan Shrine"; Transliteration: "Mangan Jinja ni Kami-sama Arawaru" (Japanese: 満願神社に神さまあらわる)	December 17, 1998
Ojarumaru wants to know what is inside of the shrine. Okorinbou and Nikorinbou try to stop him. Instead, they are taken in prince's sweet words and follow him inside. The walls and floors are covered with moss, spider webs and mushrooms. They find a large strange-looking mushroom. It is not a mushroom but the God of Poverty who brings nothing but bad luck to anyone.
55	"Marie Mansion's Treasure"; Transliteration: "Marie Yashiki no Takaramono" (Japanese: マリーやしきのたからもの)	December 18, 1998
Ojarumaru and Kazuma helps Tommy to excavate Marie's backyard. Okorinbou, Nikorinbou and the Oni Child Trio are peeping into the yard behind the bushes. The dogs expects treasure and the oni want the scepter. The dogs offer their help to Tommy. They are sniffing around and smell something in the ground. An urn and a small box come out. Then, Marie snatches the box in a flurry.
56	"The Keeping Tamura Family"; Transliteration: "Totteoku Tamura-san Ikka" (Japanese: とっておく田村さん一家)	December 21, 1998
Ojarumaru finds Kazuma's old toy in the closet and puts it in his cap. Kazuma asks the prince to bring it back. But the prince talks him down, saying Kazuma just keeps it without playing it for a long time. To keep anything in the closet is not only Kazuma's habit but his parents have the same habit.
57	"Ojaru Has a Camera"; Transliteration: "Ojaru Kamera o Motsu" (Japanese: おじゃるカメラを持つ)	December 22, 1998
The Oni Child Trio flee away when they see Tommy taking a photo of them. Tommy follows them to the park where Ojarumaru and Kazuma are playing. Kazuma asks Tommy to take a shot, but Ojarumaru is frightened. He thinks he will be sucked into the camera.
58	"Ojaru Goes to Yoshiko Tanaka's Store"; Transliteration: "Ojaru Tanaka Yoshiko no Mise ni Iku" (Japanese: おじゃるタナカヨシコの店に行く)	December 23, 1998
Ojarumaru and Tommy visit Yoshiko Tanaka's variety shop. Yoshiko likes the prince's scepter and wants to exchange her photo. The prince turns down, but Yoshiko insists on. Ojarumaru offers Denbo instead of the scepter.
59	"Great King Enma Shouted from His Gut"; Transliteration: "Hara kara Sakenda Enma Daiou" (Japanese: 腹からさけんだエンマ大王)	December 24, 1998
Denbo has a stomachache. He had too many cold drinks. He can not fly for a long time as he feels pain on his belly in the wind. He takes a rest near the tent of the Oni Child Trio. Then, something zooms at him and sticks on his belly. He thinks it is moxa and lights it for moxabustion. Suddenly, a loud voice bursts out of it. It is not a moxa, but the message sent for the Oni Child Trio from Great King Enma in the Heian era.
60	"Shopping With Ojaru"; Transliteration: "Ojaru Kaimono ni Tsukiau" (Japanese: おじゃる買いものにつきあう)	December 25, 1998
Tommy makes another mechanical doll. He names it "The Shopping Doll" as it goes out shopping while he is busy studying. The doll goes out to buy apples and milk with Ojarumaru. The doll orders "appludding" at the grocery shop The doll confuses the apple and pudding when Ojarumaru asks it to buy pudding.
61	"The Poverty God Who Cried"; Transliteration: "Naita Binbougami" (Japanese: 泣いた貧乏神)	December 28, 1998
The God of Poverty moves into the house of Sachiyo. Ojarumaru finds her getting leaner day by day and asks Okorinbou and Nikorinbou to take the God of Poverty back to the shrine. They finally agree to the prince and try to drag the God of Poverty out of Sachiyo's house. But the god likes her so much and wants to make her more miserable.
62	"Otome-sensei Completely Becomes a Swan"; Transliteration: "Otome-sensei Hakuchou ni Narikiri" (Japanese: 乙女先生 白鳥になりきる)	December 29, 1998
Tommy is surprised to see Otome-sensei squatting in the bird shack. She says she wants to be a swan, so Tommy gives her hand-made wings. She wears the wings, but Ojarumaru thinks of her as an angel, not a swan. Later, she thinks on the bank of pond how she can change herself into a swan. Ken misunderstands that she commits suicide.
63	"I Want a Bike"; Transliteration: "Charin ga Hoshī de ojaru" (Japanese: チャリンがほしいでおじゃる)	December 30, 1998
Ojarumaru wants a saving box when he sees Kazuma putting some coins in his. The prince likes the clinging sound when the coins drop inside. He sees the guardian dogs are collecting contribution on the street. The prince invites Okorinbou to Kazuma's house, so that he can hear the clinging sound if Kazuma's family offers some coins.
64	"The Tortoise, the Hare, and Ojarumaru"; Transliteration: "Usagi to Kame to Ojarumaru" (Japanese: ウサギとカメとおじゃる丸)	January 4, 1999
The turtle sisters, Tome and Kame, say Ojarumaru is slower than a turtle. The prince takes them on for a race: to go to Grandpa Tommy's house and return here. The slowest race in the history begins. Nobody knows when it is over. The Oni Child Trio disguise themselves as rabbits and prepare to ambush the prince at Tommy's house. But, their disguise is easily spotted.
65	Transliteration: "Kazuma Ishi o Tebanasu" (Japanese: カズマ 石を手ばなす)	January 5, 1999
Ojarumaru picks up a stone for Kazuma at a place called "Hideout of Oni" in Moonlight Town. Kazuma likes it and keeps it on his bed at night. Then, he hears someone crying. He is shocked to find out the stone is weeping. Kazuma decides to take it back to the place where it was found.
66	"Ojaru Finding Things"; Transliteration: "Ojaru Hiroi Mono o Suru" (Japanese: おじゃる 拾いものをする)	January 6, 1999
When Ojarumaru visits a police box, he likes a policeman's club. On his way back home, the prince sees Kinchan taking a foreigner to the police box. Kin-chan is so honest to bring anything he finds to the police box. The Oni Child Trio plan to change themselves into something valuable to be brought to the police box where Ojarumaru is resting.
67	"Denbo vs Denki"; Transliteration: "Denbo tai Denki" (Japanese: 電ボ 対 電キ)	January 7, 1999
Ojarumaru discovers that the house is lighted by electricity. He wants to see the electricity, but Kazuma says it is impossible. The prince wants to ask the electricity to light up his parents' mansion in the Heian era. Denbo is afraid he might lose his job, so he decides to be an apprentice of Mr. Electricity.
68	"Ojaru and the Oni Go to an Island"; Transliteration: "Ojaru Oni ga Shima e Iku" (Japanese: おじゃる鬼が島へ行く)	January 8, 1999
Ojarumaru picks up a book in the bookshop. He likes fairy tales and continues to read more books. He does not care about the shopkeeper's grimace. The Oni Child Trio surround the prince and take back the scepter. But they are charmed by the fairy tales and are sucked with the prince into the world of fairy tales.
69	"I am a Second Generation Coffee Mask?"; Transliteration: "Maro wa Nidaime Kōhī Kamen?" (Japanese: マロは二代目コーヒー仮面?)	January 11, 1999
Mike the Coffee Mask can not carry his role as "a mask man" and asks Ojarumaru to succeed it. The prince accepts, but soon Mike finds the prince is not good for this role. Tommy comes up with an idea to help Mike.
70	"Kin Papa Strives for Health"; Transliteration: "Kin Papa Kenkou ni Hagemu" (Japanese: 金パパ健康にはげむ)	January 12, 1999
Kin-chan's father wants to maintain his health for his family. He begins skipping rope, but it is no fun to do it alone. He invites Ojarumaru to join the exercise, but the prince has no interest in moving his muscles. Then the father invites the Oni Child Trio but they run away with fear. The prince cajoles Kin-chan's father to give up the exercise. The father insists to climb several steps at least, but the prince has no intention to waste his energy.
71	"The Hamster Vanishes Twice"; Transliteration: "Hamustā wa 2-dou Kieru" (Japanese: ハムスターは2度消える)	January 13, 1999
Kimi-chan is working at the fortune telling stand of Cold Tessai. Kimi-chan likes Ojarumaru and wants to be his pet. When he moves into Kazuma's house, she is shocked to see the prince idling all day long. Kimi-chan knows the gap and difference of life style between Ojarumaru and hers. She goes back to the Cold Tessai's place.
72	"Flowers For Okorinbou"; Transliteration: "Okorinbou ni Hanataba o" (Japanese: オコリン坊に花束を)	January 14, 1999
A foreign girl named Jessica comes to visit Okorinbou everyday. Okorinbou decides to keep his status as a stone guardian to see her. One day, Ojarumaru sees Jessica and her parents going into a pet shop. Jessica comes out with a puppy in her arms. The puppy is just like Okorinbou. The dog Jessica used to have looked like Okorinbou.
73	"Mama Takes the Day Off"; Transliteration: "Mama Mama o Saboru" (Japanese: ママ ママをさぼる)	January 15, 1999
Ojarumaru admires Ai's skill to peel the skin of apples. Ai is not pleased at all. She looks tired of all the works the mother takes care of in the house. The prince tells her to take a break, but it's not easy for Ai. So Kazuma and his dad, Makoto, take up Ai's works.
74	"Ken Becomes a Thinking Person"; Transliteration: "Ken Kangaeru Hito ni Naru" (Japanese: ケン考える人になる)	January 18, 1999
Ken takes a part time job at Mike's coffee shop. Soon he gets bored of extreme quietness of this shop. He likes working hard and vigorously. When he goes out on an errand, he helps Ojarumaru, Tome and Kame. The turtle sisters give him a treasure box. When Ken opens it, the smoke comes out. Ken is panicked he might get old instantly, however, he does not change. In fact, the smoke has the power to makes the brain more wrinkled so that a person will be "a thinking man". Ken becomes a man of deep thoughts.
75	"Refresh at the Oni Mountain"; Transliteration: "Oni ga Yama de Rifuresshu" (Japanese: オニが山でリフレッシュ)	January 19, 1999
Kazuma and Ojarumaru go up on Oni Mountain with Komachi and Kin-chan for camping. The prince meets a grasshopper named Geese. Geese's dream is to visit a town some day. However, Geese's thought begins changing while he is watching what the kids from town are doing. They are so clumsy to prepare the meal. Some of them are so lazy as to giving no help to the others.
76	"Denbo Masters Mimicry"; Transliteration: "Denbo Monomane o Kiwameru" (Japanese: 電ボモノマネをきわめる)	January 20, 1999
When Kazuma asks if Denbo's mimicry is so good, Ojarumaru replies it is far from the real persons. Denbo is shocked when he listens to his recording on tape. It is really terrible. He has hard training in the prince's cap and his mimicry is improved amazingly. He devotes himself in training too much and loses his own voice.
77	"Ojaru Saves the World"; Transliteration: "Ojaru Chikyuu o Sukuu" (Japanese: おじゃる地球を救う)	January 21, 1999
When Ojarumaru and Kazuma are relaxing on a hill, an alien with strange hair style appears. His name is Hoshino who comes to earth to finish his homework for his summer vacation. The alien wants to take the scepter from the prince, but the prince take it back easily. Then, Hoshino wants to collect a sample inhabitant on earth and grabs the prince with his magic hand. Ojarumaru then grabs the alien with his scepter.
78	"A Town Without Tsukkii"; Transliteration: "Tsukki no Kieta Machi" (Japanese: ツッキーの消えた町)	January 22, 1999
79	"Cow Becomes a Deer"; Transliteration: "Ushi Shika ni Naru" (Japanese: 牛鹿になる)	January 25, 1999
80	"The God of Poverty's Latent Energy"; Transliteration: "Binbōgami no Sokodjikara" (Japanese: 貧乏神の底力)	January 26, 1999
81	Transliteration: "Medetai nō Honda-sensei" (Japanese: めでたいのう本田先生)	January 27, 1999
82	"Which Tea is the Best?"; Transliteration: "Dono Ocha Ichiban?" (Japanese: どのお茶いちばん？)	January 28, 1999
83	"Captain Aobee"; Transliteration: "Kyaputen Aobee" (Japanese: キャプテン·アオベエ)	January 29, 1999
84	Transliteration: "Ojaru Migotona Shaku Sabaki" (Japanese: おじゃるみごとなシャクさばき)	February 1, 1999
85	"Mr. Udon Seller and the Childhood Friend"; Transliteration: "Udonya-san to Osananajimi" (Japanese: うどん屋さんとおさななじみ)	February 2, 1999
86	"Ojaru Becomes the First God"; Transliteration: "Ojaru Tsuitachi Kamisama ni Naru" (Japanese: おじゃる 一日神さまになる)	February 3, 1999
Hidden in the shadow of the offertory box of the Mangan Shrine, Ojarumaru, Okobou and Nikobou had heard secretly wishes of the people who came to pray. Eventually, Marie is coming. What is Marie's wish?
87	Transliteration: "Komachi Papa wa Biyōshi-san" (Japanese: 小町パパは美容師さん)	4 February 1999
88	"Full of Troubles: Mr. Shōshin"; Transliteration: "Nayami ga Ippai Shōshin-san" (Japanese: なやみがいっぱい 小心さん)	5 February 1999
89	Transliteration: "Ojaru to Kin-chan Kurabekko Suru" (Japanese: おじゃると金ちゃん くらべっこする)	8 February 1999
90	"Until We Meet Again"; Transliteration: "Mata au Hi made" (Japanese: また会う日まで)	9 February 1999
