= Jinshu =

Jinshu may refer to:

- The Book of Jin, one of the official Chinese historical works
- An alternate reading of the characters for Kannushi, a Shinto priest
