= Jōe =

Religious garment worn in Japan

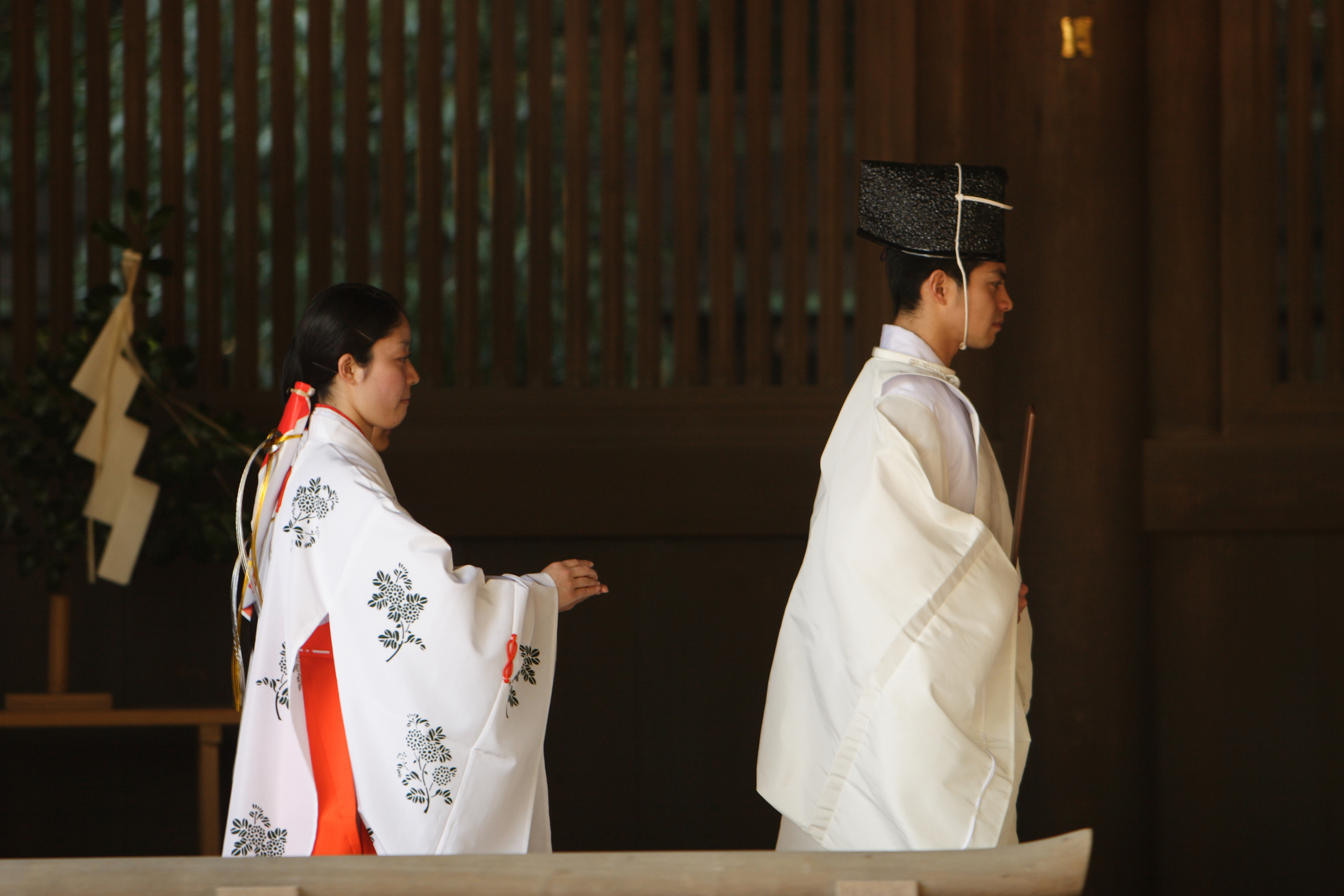
A kannushi (right) wearing a jōe

Jōe (浄衣, sometimes translated as "pure cloth") is a garment worn in Japan by people attending religious ceremonies and activities, including Buddhist and Shinto related occasions. The jōe is essentially a white kariginu, traditional hunting robes worn by nobles during the Heian period.

Though both Shinto and Buddhist priests wear jōe to rituals, laymen also occasionally wear the jōe, such as when participating in pilgrimage such as the Shikoku Pilgrimage. The garment is usually white or yellow, and is made of linen or silk depending on its type and use.

Shinto priests who wear the jōe usually wear it with a peaked cap known as tate-eboshi, alongside an outer tunic - the jōe proper - an outer robe called jōe no sodegukuri no o, an undergarment known as the hitoe (lit. "unlined" or "one-layer"), ballooning trousers called sashinuki or nubakama (a variant of the hakama), and a girdle called jōe no ate-obi. A priest may also carry a ceremonial wand known as a haraegushi, or another style of baton known as a shaku.

== See also ==
- Glossary of Shinto
