= Ojarumaru series 3 =

Ojarumaru
- Series 3
- No. of episodes: 90

Release
- Original network: NHK
- Original release: April 5 – December 1, 2000

Series chronology
- ← Previous; Series 2 Next → Series 4

The third series of the Ojarumaru anime series aired from April 5 to December 1, 2000, on NHK for a total of 90 episodes.

The series' opening theme is "Utahito" (詠人) by Saburō Kitajima. The ending theme is "Kooni Trio no Theme" (子鬼トリオのテーマ The Theme of the Oni Child Trio) by Kazuya Ichijou, Omi Minami, and Yūji Ueda.

The series was released on VHS by Nippon Crown across fifteen volumes, each containing six episodes, from June 21, 2000, to February 21, 2001. Nippon Crown later released the series on DVD across two compilation volumes, each containing ten selected episodes, simultaneously on January 22, 2003. The first volume contains episodes 181, 185, 186, 201, 214, 215, 217, 221, and 224. The second volume contains episodes 225, 230, 238, 240, 242, 246, 251, 253, 264, and 270.

== Episodes ==
No.	Title	Original release date
181	"N/A"	April 3, 2000
While picking at the radio, Ojarumaru accidentally switches it on. He thinks the radio starts talking to him and tries to answer nonsense to it. Then, he shows off difficult words he learned from the radio without knowing their meanings.
182	"Poverty-chan Participates in the Club"	April 4, 2000
Povery-chan is a member of the Tiny Things Club, but nobody sees it to attend the meeting. Other members manage to take the god out, but they are sick and tired of hearing its ongoing complaints.
183	"N/A"	April 5, 2000
Tommy believes there used to be an oni in Moonlight Town. He digs up holes to find the remains. When the Oni Child Trio come up for Ojarumaru's scepter, a hot spring is found and everybody enjoys outside hot spa together.
184	"Rainy Moonlight Town"	April 6, 2000
Ojarumaru brings an umbrella to Kazuma. He goes back home on Kazuma's back, but complains he gets wet as he does not like water. However, soon he finds it is very interesting to listen to the sound of rain and watch a rainbow in the sky.
185	"Momoman"	April 7, 2000
At the bookstore, Ojarumaru is reading books without buying one. The shopkeeper comes to throw him out, but is absorbed in the prince's revised story of a famous Momotarō.
186	"Denbo Hachirō Turns Up"	April 10, 2000
Denbo takes a leave and his grandfather comes up to serve Ojarumaru. The grandfather is 108 years old and instead of taking care of Ojarumaru, he needs Ojarumaru's special assistance to do anything.
187	"Ms. Marie and the Roomer"	April 11, 2000
Marie's borders are all strange people. Every time she goes to collect the rent, she ends up in helping them out of troubles.
188	"Mama's Smile"	April 12, 2000
Kin-chan's dad wishes secretly that Kin-chan says, "I want to be like dad." His wish has not been materialized yet. Then, Kin-chan's mom gets cold and Kin-chan's dad prepares a meal for the family with clumsy hands. Kin-chan wants to be like his dad and tries to help him, only makes things worse!
189	"Kazuma Sends a Rock"	April 13, 2000
A little girl, Yuri, likes stones as Kazuma does. She comes to tell Kazuma that she is moving out of town today. She brings her stones to Kazuma. Touched, Kazuma gives out his precious rock to the girl.
190	"N/A"	April 14, 2000
Ken gets a part-time job at a stone dealer. He proves he has genius skills in stone curving! Fluttered, he curves many stones. His works cause many problems as they look so real.
191	"The Tofu, the Pudding, and Ojarumaru"	April 17, 2000
Ojarumaru helps Ai to make tofu. He finds the bowl of tofu is bigger than a pudding cup. He eats all the tofu and asks Ai to fill the bowl with pudding. But, he has eaten much tofu and he can not taste a spoonful of pudding!
192	"Café Short Rest's Best, Long Day"	April 18, 2000
Strange friends of Ojarumaru come up to Café Short Rest one after another. The master, Mike, wonders what is going on today.
193	"N/A"	April 19, 2000
Cold Tessai gets his own fortune-telling: "If he saves two turtles, he will get wonderful present." Excited, Cold Tessai saves Kame and Tome from the Oni Child Trio. He gets their hot kisses 1101 times, the same number of their ages. Bah...!!
194	"Hoshino Once Again"	April 20, 2000
The Hoshino Family, the alien invaders come back. They force landed in Tommy's garden because of rain. The Oni Child Trio become friends to the Hoshino Family as both groups have the same enemy - Ojarumaru.
195	"The Guardian Dogs Repair the Mangan Shrine"	April 21, 2000
When Okorinbou and Nikorinbou repair the floor broken by Ojarumaru, they find a treasure map. After tremendous efforts, they finally find the treasure box. In the box, there are repair tools and a letter from god: "Repair the shrine with the tools here."
196	"Marie Tells a Lie"	April 24, 2000
Mike of Café Short Rest tells the love story of Tommy and two sisters, Marie and Sally. Marie loved Tommy so much, but she lied to him as she wanted Sally to marry him.
197	"Dangerous Love"	April 25, 2000
Denbo falls in love with Ruriko the chameleon. Ruriko is touched by Denbo's kindness, but it is difficult to overcome temptation to swallow him. So, she decides to leave him.
198	"Ms. Usui in the Cap"	April 26, 2000
Usui slips into Ojarumaru's cap. It is the world of another dimension. She is shocked to meet funny-looking men. And they propose her one after another!
199	"Ojaru Entertains Ukkun"	April 27, 2000
Oshino is selling goods by entertaining people with his speaking ventriloquism doll called Ukkun. Ojarumaru thinks Ukkun is a human and invites him to his home.
200	"Marie and Yoshiko"	April 28, 2000
Marie and Yoshiko are the classmates at their high school. They know many precious items are stored in the cellar of Yoshiko's house. They finds second button of Tommy's jacket there. Marie asked Yoshiko to keep it here for the memory of her love to Tommy.
201	"Inside Marie's Hat"	May 1, 2000
Marie never takes her hat off. Ojarumaru and his friends wonder what is in her hat. They follow her to find a chance to let her take it off.
202	"Go Forward, Easy-going Vehicle"	May 2, 2000
Ojarumaru wants to ride a bicycle, but his legs too short to reach the pedals. Feeling pity, Tommy gives him a tricycle. Ojarumaru is excited, but disappointed a moment later as he thinks it moves automatically.
203	"Asa-chan's Night"	May 3, 2000
Ojarumaru likes the moon at night and Asako loves the sun in the morning. A dispute begins between the prince and Asako. All other friends agree to have the prince's lecture about the moon. It ends finally when the morning sun comes up.
204	"Kisuke Finds"	May 4, 2000
Kisuke finds a baby of an animal. He likes to take care of them and forgets his job to take back the scepter of Great King Enma.
205	"Ojamaro-kun"	May 5, 2000
A mysterious big shot called Mr. Maeda appears in Moonlight Town. His weak point is to call everybody's name inaccurately. Ojarumaru tries hard to make Mr. Maeda to pronounce his name correctly.
206	"N/A"	May 8, 2000
Ojarumaru visits Marie's boarding house. He likes to peep borders' rooms through the key holes of doors. Denbo tries to stop him, but doesn't listen.
207	"Kazuma Raises Children"	May 9, 2000
One of Denbo's family brings a baby to Kazuma's house. Everybody gets nervous to take care of the baby. Only Kazuma is very good at look after it.
208	"The Airy Objects"	May 10, 2000
When Ojarumaru stays at home, three balloons, red, blue and yellow, drift in. He is glad to play with them, one with a laughing face, the second one with a crying face and the last one with an angry face. He talks to the balloons and guides them in the house.
209	"My Day Off"	May 11, 2000
Ojarumaru envies when he sees other people playing around and relaxing on the weekend. Tommy tells him if he works, he will get a nice weekend.
210	"Scoop vs Tsukkii"	May 12, 2000
A cameraman called Mr. Scoop comes to hunt Tsukkii for his big news. Ojarumaru and his friends are afraid Tsukkii might be taken away. So, they plan to cheat the cameraman.
211	"Scoop vs Denbo"	May 15, 2000
Mr. Scoop comes back to catch Denbo this time. Ojarumaru and his friends get together once again to hide Denbo.
212	"Ojaru Unites"	May 16, 2000
Playing run-and-chase, Ojarumaru and the Oni Child Trio jump on Tsukkii. Tsukkii does not move away from the bank of pond. It begins sinking...!
213	"Tazan's One-man Exhibition"	May 17, 2000
A ceramist, Tazan, is very shy. He plans to have an exhibition of his own works, but because of shyness, he sets up the exhibition site deep in the mountain. Ojarumaru and his friends have hard time finding it.
214	"Pressing Moonlight Mushroom"	May 18, 2000
Usui picks up a Moonlight mushroom with Mr. Kanbutsu. She dries it out and presses on the color paper. Mr. Kanbutsu is touched by her artistic sense and tells her to paste more and more...
215	"Okame Day"	May 19, 2000
Princess Okame sets up "the day to give hand-made snack to the person you love." She makes Ojarumaru's favorite snack, roasted beans, and brings them to Moonlight Town. Her idea called "Okame Day" spreads out over the whole town.
216	"Okame Tastes Candy"	May 22, 2000
Princess Okame makes pudding for Ojarumaru's dessert. She tries and tries but the prince does not say good. When Kin-chan consoles her with half-melted candy, she gets a good idea.
217	"Rainy Day Dengon"	May 23, 2000
On a rainy day, Ojarumaru and his friends start playing Dengon. The Oni Child Trio challenge the prince and his team.
218	"Denbo and the Kuri"	May 24, 2000
Denbo falls in love with Kurumi the chestnut. He takes Kurumi out of the burr where chestnuts brothers are always quarreling.
219	"Iwashimizu Doing Apprenticeship"	May 25, 2000
Iwashimizu becomes an apprentice of Coffee Mask. He wants to be a true hero, but he learns only the subdued and restrained way of behaviors.
220	"Enma Becomes Akane"	May 26, 2000
Great King Enma switches his body with Akane's in order to take his scepter back. But, the timing is not good. Green Oni who is in love with Akane comes up to confess his love to Akane!
221	"Laughing God of Poverty"	May 29, 2000
Poverty-chan gets sick and lies in bed. Meanwhile the Mangan Shrine becomes clean and shining. Okorinbou and Nikorinbou are looking for a god who can cure Poverty-chan.
222	"The Twin Dogs Breakup"	May 30, 2000
Okorinbou is invited by a rich man to live in a big mansion. He breaks up with Nikorinbou and moves to the rich man's house.
223	"The Backpack, Breaks"	May 31, 2000
Kazuma's backpack is the driving seat of Ojarumaru. Kazuma carries the prince sitting on it always. Then, the backpack is broken, and Kazuma and Kin-chan rack their brain to find out the best way to carry the prince.
224	"Oshino vs Hoshino"	June 1, 2000
Hoshino meets Oshino the salesman. Hoshino has no emotion and shows no interest to the thing Oshino wants to sell. Oshino desperately explains how marvelous it is.
225	"Face Contest"	June 2, 2000
Ojarumaru and Kin-chan play "Outstare the Opponent". The game gets escalated and their faces becomes too deformed to go back to normal!
226	"Stuffed Life"	October 2, 2000
The Oni Child Trio's tent is full of their costumes for disguise. They give the old costumes out for recycling. Suddenly, Moonlight Town looks like the site of a big costume party!
227	"The Lost Scepter"	October 3, 2000
The scepter worries about Great King Enma, who can not give verdicts to the deceased. It decides to go back to Great King Enma. It feels happy to assist Great King Enma at the beginning, but it is at a loss when Ojarumaru cuts in with nonsense.
228	"The Heian Era Hawaiian Land"	October 4, 2000
Denbo goes to a hot spa resort on holidays. He tells Ojarumaru how wonderful the resort was. The prince gets sulky to hear it. Denbo goes away to the resort again and the prince feels lonely.
229	"Scoop vs the Oni Child"	October 5, 2000
Mr. Scoop the cameraman comes back. He fixes his eyes on the Oni Child Trio. Ojarumaru and his friends have hard time to hide the three oni kids, Kisuke, Akane and Aobee from Scoop.
230	"N/A"	October 6, 2000
Tommy weighs the Oni Child Trio with the scales used for vegetables. Ojarumaru asks Tommy to weigh him in the same scales, in competition with the Oni Child Trio.
231	"N/A"	October 9, 2000
Tommy makes too many windup mechanical dolls. So, he makes anew mechanical doll to take care of other dolls. But, this dolls works too quick and snappy in winding up the springs of other dolls. Tommy gets much busier than before!
232	"Viva! Pebble"	October 10, 2000
Komachi's new hobby is collecting pretty stones. All of a sudden it becomes a boom in Moonlight Town. Only Kazuma is not excited as he has been collecting stones for a long time.
233	"Scoop vs the Scepter"	October 11, 2000
The new target of Mr. Scoop is the scepter of Great King Enma. Everybody is involved in hiding it from Scoop.
234	"Scoop vs the Twin Dogs"	October 12, 2000
Now Mr. Scoop turns his eyes on the twin guardian dogs of Mangan Shrine. Everybody, gather round! Ojarumaru and his friend helps each other to save Okorinbou and Nikorinbou.
235	"The Tiny Holes"	October 13, 2000
Nikorinbou wants to join the Tiny Things Club and breaks up Okorinbou. Ojarumaru asks Nikorinbou to get through small holes one after another.
236	"The Tiny Things Club Secret Base"	October 16, 2000
The Tiny Things Club needs a secret place where members can speak out complaints and frustration freely. They check out various places recommended by members, but one is too small. The other place is too high on the tree for Ojarumaru, the chairman, to climb up.
237	"Looking For Kimi-chan's Stars"	October 17, 2000
Kimi-chan the fortuneteller loses her power to prove her words right. The stars on her back disappear! The members of the Tiny Club go out to find the stars.
238	"The Moonlight Town Song"	October 18, 2000
The competition to choose the town song of Moonlight Town is held. Folks sings their songs on the stage. Ojarumaru overhears Kisuke singing a song and imitates it on the stage.
239	"Ojaru's Tears"	October 19, 2000
Cold Tessai foresees Ojarumaru crying by his fortune telling. He wants to protect the prince and follows wherever the prince goes.
240	"N/A"	October 20, 2000
Ojarumaru learns that Kazuma received a testimonial. He plans that the Tiny Things Club gives the testimonial to people who are helpful to the club. But, nobody takes it willingly....
241	"There's Not Enough Praise"	October 23, 2000
Ojarumaru sees Kazuma is receiving compliments. He wants to get compliments and forces Denbo and all his friends to give flutters to him.
242	"N/A"	October 24, 2000
Honda-sensei the teacher is a serious guy. He decides to build up strong body to protect Asako in need of time. Unfortunately, he trains too much and his body becomes too solid to move! He can not move at all!
243	"Oja Snow Princess and the 6 Tiny Kimono People"	October 25, 2000
A little snow princess played by Ojarumaru is shocked to receive the God of Poverty from the evil queen played by Great King Enma. Denbo passes by and tries to help the princess from poverty...
244	"Kazuma Stone"	October 26, 2000
Kazuma enters into Ojarumaru's cap. He turns into a small stone and wanders in the strange world.
245	"Mama Becomes an Actress"	October 27, 2000
Ai wants to be an actress and begins practicing a role of evil woman while she is doing house works. Ojarumaru and Ai's family are scared of her malicious attitude.
246	"The Poem Reading Battle"	October 30, 2000
Kisuke's poem is praised by the famous poet. Ojarumaru makes one poem after another but cannot beat Kisuke's poem.
247	"Akane to London"	October 31, 2000
Ballet dancer, Otome-sensi, says that Akane has good talent in ballet dancing. Akane is worried about her mission to take back the scepter. She is getting better and is invited to practice in London.
248	"The God of Poverty Drank Coffee"	November 1, 2000
Ojarumaru tells Poverty-chan how tasty the coffee is. Poverty-chan makes up its mind to try coffee at Café Short Rest.
249	"Viva! Shiritori"	November 2, 2000
Komachi is absorbed in playing shiritori. It becomes instant boom in Moonlight Town as usual. She always starts the bell on anything.
250	"N/A"	November 3, 2000
Ojarumaru finds a Heian Bird in the rooftop garden of Mr. Sakata's mansion. It is believed the bird had become extinct a long time ago. The Heian Bird was very adventurous it is elegantly slow and quiet now.
251	"Ojaru Reads Minds"	November 6, 2000
Denbo is captured by the Oni Child Trio! The Oni Child Trio proposes Ojarumaru to exchange Denbo with the scepter. But, the prince does not appear. Denbo is afraid that the prince might forget to help him.
252	"Denbo Grumbles Again"	November 7, 2000
Denbo gets drunk after eating a brandy cake. He starts complains about Ojarumaru in front of his own master!
253	"Ojaru Forgets About His Parents"	November 8, 2000
Kazuma draws his parents at school. Ojarumaru wants to draw his parents, too. He is shocked as he does not remember his parents' faces!
254	"Akane Betrays?"	November 9, 2000
Akane wants to cook delicious food for Aobee and Kisuke. She is secretly learning how to cook from Kazuma's mother, Ai. Then, Aobee and Kisuke misunderstand her for betrayal.
255	"Denbo Detective"	November 10, 2000
Denbo sees Kazuma's dad, Makoto, going away from home and follows him to find where he is heading. He looks suspicious. Soon, Denbo becomes a detective full of doubts and suspicion.
256	"N/A"	November 13, 2000
On a rainy day, Ojarumaru and his friends get bored and start Gesture Game. Then, the Oni Child Trio come up and the game is totally messed up.
257	"Ojaru and the Snowman"	November 14, 2000
Friends of Moonlight Town enjoys snowball battle. Ojarumaru befriends a snowman who joins his team.
258	"The Ants and Oja-Bear"	November 15, 2000
Is it a good dream or a nightmare? It depends who has it. Oja-Bear plays around all through the summer and eats up all the food of Denbo family and banbi-ants.
259	"Warashi-chan's House"	November 16, 2000
Yoshiko takes Ojarumaru and his friends to an empty house. They play with a little girl who appears from nowhere. But, should no one live in this house?
260	"The God of Poverty's Class Reunion"	November 17, 2000
Poverty-chan becomes the organizer of a class reunion of its fellow gods. Poverty-chan wants to show off as a dignified god and asks Okorinbou and Nikorinbou to pretend to be its servant dogs.
261	"Scoop vs Ojaru"	November 20, 2000
Finally, Mr. Scoop focuses his eyes on Ojarumaru. The prince is a great target of a big news! All the friends works hard to hide the prince out of the cameraman's search.
262	"N/A"	November 21, 2000
Usui is dating with Cold Tessai at Café Short Break. Mr. Kanbutsu and Ken come to have coffee, too. Usui feels all the men are hostile to each other because of her charm.
263	"N/A"	November 22, 2000
The free prayer book is installed at the Mangan Shrine. People can write anything they wish in this book. Thanks to this idea, Mangan Shrine becomes popular. In the same time the God of poverty disappears and Okorinbou thinks it is the reason of today's success.
264	"The Laid-back Way"	November 23, 2000
Ken, the free-lance worker, quits the job again. He is impressed the take-it-easy style of Ojarumaru and wants to learn the true style of relaxation from the prince.
265	"Ojaru is Late"	November 24, 2000
Ojarumaru is always late for the meetings at the Tiny Things Club. He tries make awkward excuses. Other members get angry and...
266	"Denbo and the Swallowtail Butterfly"	November 27, 2000
Denbo meets a girl worm of a butterfly. He is touched by her naivete and falls in love with her. Soon, the worm changes into a beautiful butterfly and her personality also changes into selfishness.
267	"Cow Doing an Arranged Marriage"	November 28, 2000
Cow meets Cowko for an arranged marriage. Cow is happy to accept it, but Ojarumaru finds out this is Princess Okame's plan. She expects the prince think of her more seriously. Ojarumaru gets upset and opposes this arranged marriage.
268	"Tsukkii's Smile Disappeared"	November 29, 2000
Tsukkii makes grimace and he loses one horn. Ojarumaru and his friends want him to get back a good smile. So, they dig up what happened.
269	"Street Corner"	November 30, 2000
A red dress is displayed in a show window at a corner of street. Komachi and the people of Moonlight Town are attracted to it without knowing why. It there a spell or a good charm on it?
270	"Half of This Happiness"	December 1, 2000
Ojarumaru and Kazuma have a quarrel over the orange. Ojarumaru walks out of Kazuma's house and goes to Tommy's. He wants to live with Tommy...
