= Ojarumaru series 4 =

Ojarumaru
- Series 4
- No. of episodes: 90

Release
- Original network: NHK
- Original release: April 2 – November 30, 2001

Series chronology
- ← Previous; Series 3 Next → Series 5

The fourth series of the Ojarumaru anime series aired from April 2 to November 30, 2001, on NHK for a total of 90 episodes.

The series' opening theme is "Utahito" (詠人) by Saburō Kitajima. The ending theme is "Koi o Itashi Mashou♪" (恋をいたしましょう♪ Let us Love♪) by Rie Iwatsubo.

The series was released on VHS by Nippon Crown across fifteen volumes, each containing 6 episodes, from August 3 to April 5, 2001. Nippon Crown later released the series on DVD across two compilation volumes, each containing 10 selected episodes, simultaneously on April 2, 2003. The first volume contains episodes 273 through 276, 290, 296, 303, 305, and 319. The second volume contains episodes 322, 326, 328, 329, 337, 339, 347, 351, 354, and 357.

== Episodes ==
| No. | Title | Original release date |
|---|---|---|
| 271 | "New Ojarumaru" | April 2, 2001 |
| 272 | "Okame Comes to Grasp" | April 3, 2001 |
| 273 | "Ojaru Lives With the Oni Child" | April 4, 2001 |
| 274 | "Rainy Day Usui" | April 5, 2001 |
| 275 | "Ojaru Exceeds the Budget" | April 6, 2001 |
| 276 | "Rainy Day Old Maid" | April 9, 2001 |
| 277 | "The Club Swells" | April 10, 2001 |
| 278 | "The Motivation Board" | April 11, 2001 |
| 279 | "Enma Gathers the Scepter" | April 12, 2001 |
| 280 | "Okame Biyori" | April 13, 2001 |
| 281 | "Ojaru Revives Mike" | April 16, 2001 |
| 282 | "N/A" | April 17, 2001 |
| 283 | "Denbo Detective Follows Cold Tessai" | April 18, 2001 |
| 284 | "1 Good Friend!" | April 19, 2001 |
| 285 | "Ken Competes for a Part-Time Job" | April 20, 2001 |
| 286 | "Tanaka Becomes Neat" | April 23, 2001 |
| 287 | "Kisuke Covers Up a Mistake" | April 24, 2001 |
| 288 | "Tommy and Children" | April 25, 2001 |
| 289 | "Omomomaru" | April 26, 2001 |
| 290 | "Kisuke's Horn" | April 27, 2001 |
| 291 | "Tommy and Makoto" | April 30, 2001 |
| 292 | "A Rock Love Letter" | May 1, 2001 |
| 293 | "Ojatsurumaru's Repayment" | May 2, 2001 |
| 294 | "Akemi Disappeared" | May 3, 2001 |
| 295 | "The Oni Child Nursing" | May 4, 2001 |
| 296 | "The Tamura Family in the Critical Moment" | May 7, 2001 |
| 297 | "The Men Couple" | May 8, 2001 |
| 298 | "Papa and to the Moonlight Tower 2" | May 9, 2001 |
| 299 | "Ojaru Becomes Busy" | May 10, 2001 |
| 300 | "Miyoko Rock" | May 11, 2001 |
| 301 | "Ms. Usui Becomes a Popular Person" | May 14, 2001 |
| 302 | "Ukkun, the True Identity is Exposed!?" | May 15, 2001 |
| 303 | "Dull Denbo" | May 16, 2001 |
| 304 | "Otome and the Old Men" | May 17, 2001 |
| 305 | "The Hoshino Family Drank Coffee" | May 18, 2001 |
| 306 | "Usui: The Speech Crash Course" | May 21, 2001 |
| 307 | "Papa Returns to His Parents' Home" | May 22, 2001 |
| 308 | "N/A" | May 23, 2001 |
| 309 | "The Poverty-chan Festival" | May 24, 2001 |
| 310 | "Fan Club, Fan Club" | May 25, 2001 |
| 311 | "Small Ojarumaru" | May 28, 2001 |
| 312 | "Beautiful Trash" | May 29, 2001 |
| 313 | "The Small and Yet Admirable Ojarumaru" | May 30, 2001 |
| 314 | "Run, Kazuma" | May 31, 2001 |
| 315 | "Ojaru Gives Parents to Ukkun" | June 1, 2001 |
| 316 | "Kimi-chan: Introduction to the Trio" | October 1, 2001 |
| 317 | "N/A" | October 2, 2001 |
| 318 | "Ojaru Returns the Scepter" | October 3, 2001 |
| 319 | "Denboko" | October 4, 2001 |
| 320 | "The 3 Piece Set Running" | October 5, 2001 |
| 321 | "N/A" | October 8, 2001 |
| 322 | "Nikobou Builds a Doghouse" | October 9, 2001 |
| 323 | "Enma Becomes Aobee" | October 10, 2001 |
| 324 | "The Alone But Not Lonely Director" | October 11, 2001 |
| 325 | "Kame-Tome Scouting" | October 12, 2001 |
| 326 | "There's Not Enough Conversation" | October 15, 2001 |
| 327 | "King Ojaru's Sadness" | October 16, 2001 |
| 328 | "Kimi-chan's Tail is Extending" | October 17, 2001 |
| 329 | "The Cartoon-character Costume Way" | October 18, 2001 |
| 330 | "N/A" | October 19, 2001 |
| 331 | "Viva! The Moonlight Town Girls Club" | October 22, 2001 |
| 332 | "Ojarumaru Waits for Papa" | October 23, 2001 |
| 333 | "The Exchange Diary of Love" | October 24, 2001 |
| 334 | "Walking Denbo" | October 25, 2001 |
| 335 | "Mr. Shōshin Came Back" | October 26, 2001 |
| 336 | "Viva! Feeding" | October 29, 2001 |
| 337 | "Camping at the Kin-chan House" | October 30, 2001 |
| 338 | "Oko-Niko Grows a Flower" | October 31, 2001 |
| 339 | "Peach Ball Fighter, Momotamā" | November 1, 2001 |
| 340 | "Denbo Detective Chases Otome" | November 2, 2001 |
| 341 | "Ocharumaru" | November 5, 2001 |
| 342 | "The Chonmage of Love" | November 6, 2001 |
| 343 | "Ojaru Disappeared" | November 7, 2001 |
| 344 | "Kin-chan Recites a Song" | November 8, 2001 |
| 345 | "Denboko Scolds" | November 9, 2001 |
| 346 | "Ojaru Grips" | November 12, 2001 |
| 347 | "Denbo Gets Stuck" | November 13, 2001 |
| 348 | "N/A" | November 14, 2001 |
| 349 | "Ms. Usui's Teabags" | November 15, 2001 |
| 350 | "Kame-Tome Get Jealous" | November 16, 2001 |
| 351 | "Okame Calls Cow" | November 19, 2001 |
| 352 | "The Mechanical Doll House" | November 20, 2001 |
| 353 | "General Winter Came" | November 21, 2001 |
| 354 | "Warashi-chan and Poverty-chan" | November 22, 2001 |
| 355 | "Ojaru-sama" | November 23, 2001 |
| 356 | "N/A" | November 26, 2001 |
| 357 | "Papa's Business Trip" | November 27, 2001 |
| 358 | "Denbo: The Theater of Love" | November 28, 2001 |
| 359 | "Another Street Corner" | November 29, 2001 |
| 360 | "Denbo-sama" | November 30, 2001 |
