= Hu (ritual baton) =

East Asian ceremonial sceptre

Chinese name
- Chinese: 笏
Transcriptions
Standard Mandarin
- Hanyu Pinyin: hù

Vietnamese name
- Vietnamese: hốt

Korean name
- Hangul: 홀
Transcriptions
- Revised Romanization: hol

Japanese name
- Hiragana: しゃく
Transcriptions
- Romanization: shaku

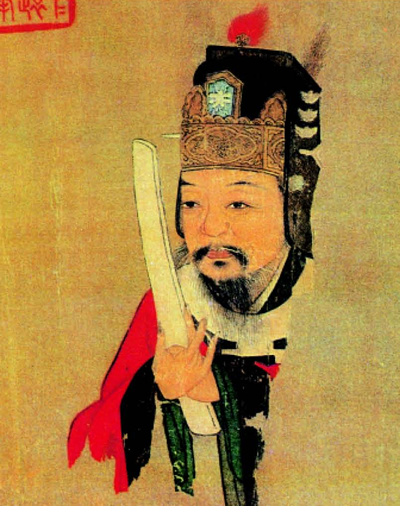
Fan Zhongyan, a Chancellor of the Northern Song Dynasty, holding a hu in this portrait

A hu (Chinese: 笏; pinyin: hù) is a flat scepter originating from China, where they were originally used as narrow tablets for recording notes and orders. They were historically used by officials throughout East Asia, including Japan, Korea, Ryukyu, and Vietnam. They are known as shaku in Japan, and are worn as part of the sokutai ceremonial outfit. They continue to be used in Daoist and Shinto ritual contexts in some parts of East Asia.

== Origin ==
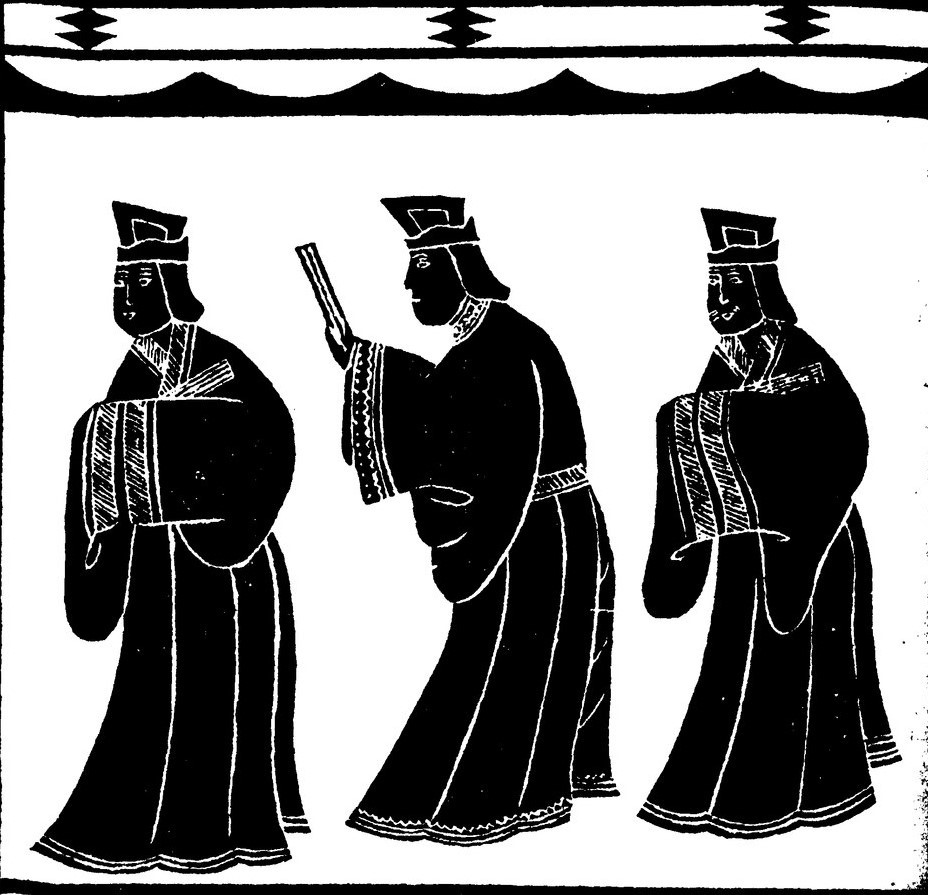
Han dynasty stone relief of scholar-officials with an early hu.

The use of the hu originated in ancient China, where the Classic of Rites required a hu to have a length of two chi six cun, and its mid part a width of three cun. Originally, the hu was held by officials in court to record significant orders and instructions by the emperors. From the Jin dynasty onwards, following the increased proliferation of paper, the hu became a ceremonial instrument. In China, it was customary to hold the hu with the broad end down and the narrow end up.

The hu was originally used at court for the taking of notes and was usually made of bamboo. Officials could record speaking notes on the tablet ahead of the audience, and record the emperor's instructions during the audience. Likewise, the emperor could use one for notes during ceremonies.

The hu eventually became a ritual implement; it also became customary for officials to shield their mouths with their hu when speaking to the emperor.

A hu can be made of different material according to the holder's rank: sovereigns used jade (similar to, but not the same as, the ceremonial jade sceptre, gui (圭))(zh), nobles used ivory, and court officials used bamboo.

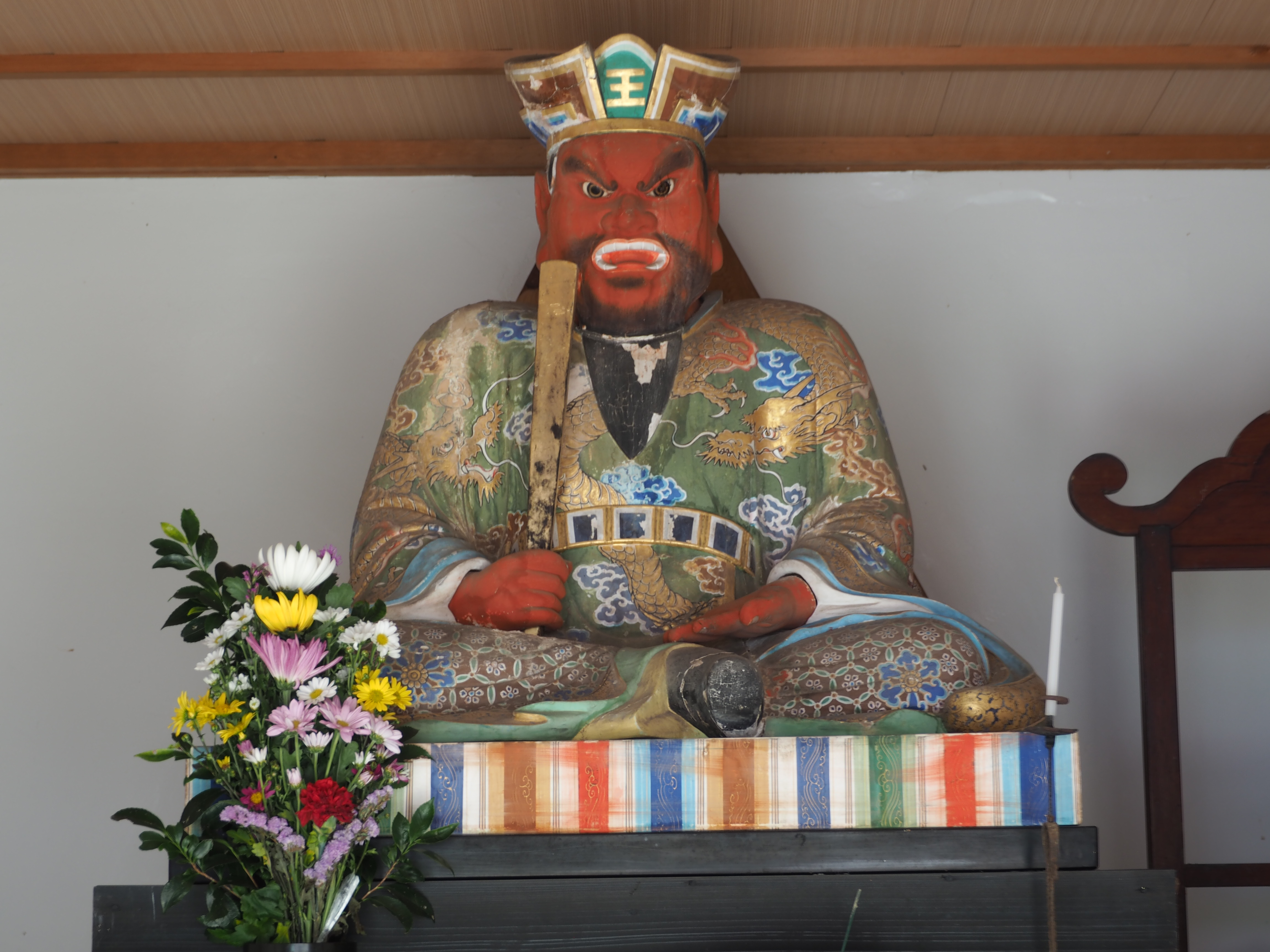
Statue of Yama bearing a shaku; Hino, Shiga, Japan

A hu is often seen in portraits of Chinese mandarins, but is now mostly used by Daoist priests (daoshi). The Buddhist deity King Yama, judge of the underworld, is often depicted bearing a hu.

== Use in China ==
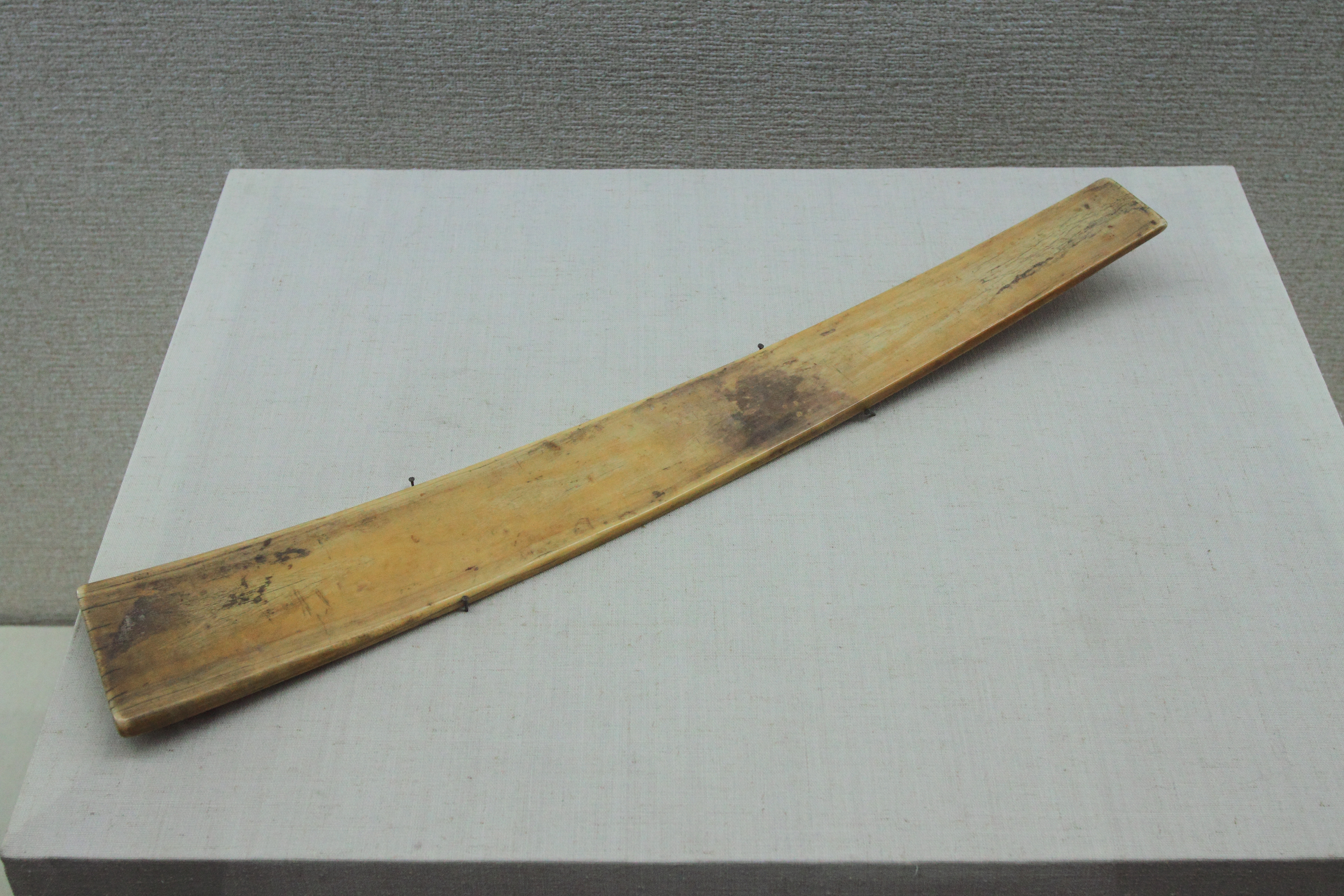
An ivory hu, Ming Dynasty; Jiangxi Provincial Museum

During the Tang dynasty, court etiquette required officials to wear the hu in their belts when riding horses. The chancellor was provided with a hu rack, which was carried into the palace. After an audience, the hu could be left on the rack. Lesser officials had hu bags, which were held by their attendants. During the early Tang dynasty, Mandarins of the fifth rank or above used ivory hu, while those below used wooden ones. The rules were further elaborated later to require that mandarins of the third rank or above used hu which were curved at the front and straight at the back, while those of the fifth rank or above used hu which were curved at the front and angled at the back. The hu used by lower rank mandarins were made of bamboo and were angled at the top and square at the bottom. In the Ming dynasty, Mandarins of the fourth rank or above used ivory hu, while those of the fifth rank or below used wooden ones.

The hu fell out of use in the Imperial Court system during the Qing dynasty. The greater ceremonial deference demanded by Qing emperors meant that officials had to greet the emperor by kowtowing, making it impractical to carry the hu to an audience.

In contemporary times, the hu is mostly used by as part of the traditional outfit of daoshi during formal and ceremonial functions such as the performing of rites.

== Use in Japan ==
The standard reading in Japanese for the character used to write shaku is kotsu, but as this is also one of the readings for the character hone (骨, "bone"), it is avoided and considered bad luck. The character's unusual pronunciation seems to derive from the fact the baton is approximately one shaku (an old unit of measurement equivalent to 30.3 cm (11.9 in)) in length.

A shaku or teita (手板) is a baton or scepter about 35 cm (14 in) long, held vertically in the right hand, and was traditionally part of a nobleman's formal attire (the sokutai). Today, the shaku is mostly used by Shinto priests during official and ceremonial functions, not only when wearing the sokutai but when wearing other types of formal clothing such as the jōe, the karaginu (狩衣) and the ikan (衣冠). The emperor's shaku is roughly square at both ends, whereas a retainer's is rounded at the top and square at the bottom. Both become progressively narrow towards the bottom. Oak is considered the best material for the shaku, followed in order by holly, cherry, sakaki, and Japanese cedar.

The shaku originally had a strip of paper attached to the back containing instructions and memoranda for the ceremony or event about to take place, but it later evolved into a purely ceremonial implement meant to add solemnity to rituals. According to the Taihō Code, a set of administrative laws implemented in the year 701, nobles of the fifth rank and above had to use an ivory shaku, while those below that rank were to use oak, Japanese yew, holly, cherry, sakaki, Japanese cedar, or other woods. Ivory, however, was too hard to obtain, and the law was changed. The Engishiki, a Japanese book of laws and regulations written in 927, permits to all the use of shaku of unfinished wood, except when wearing special ceremonial clothes called reifuku (礼服). The Japanese shaku is usually made of woods like Japanese yew, holly, cherry, sakaki, or Japanese cedar. The shaku is often seen in portraits of the Japanese shōgun, emperors, nobleman, and Shinto priests (kannushi).

== Gallery ==
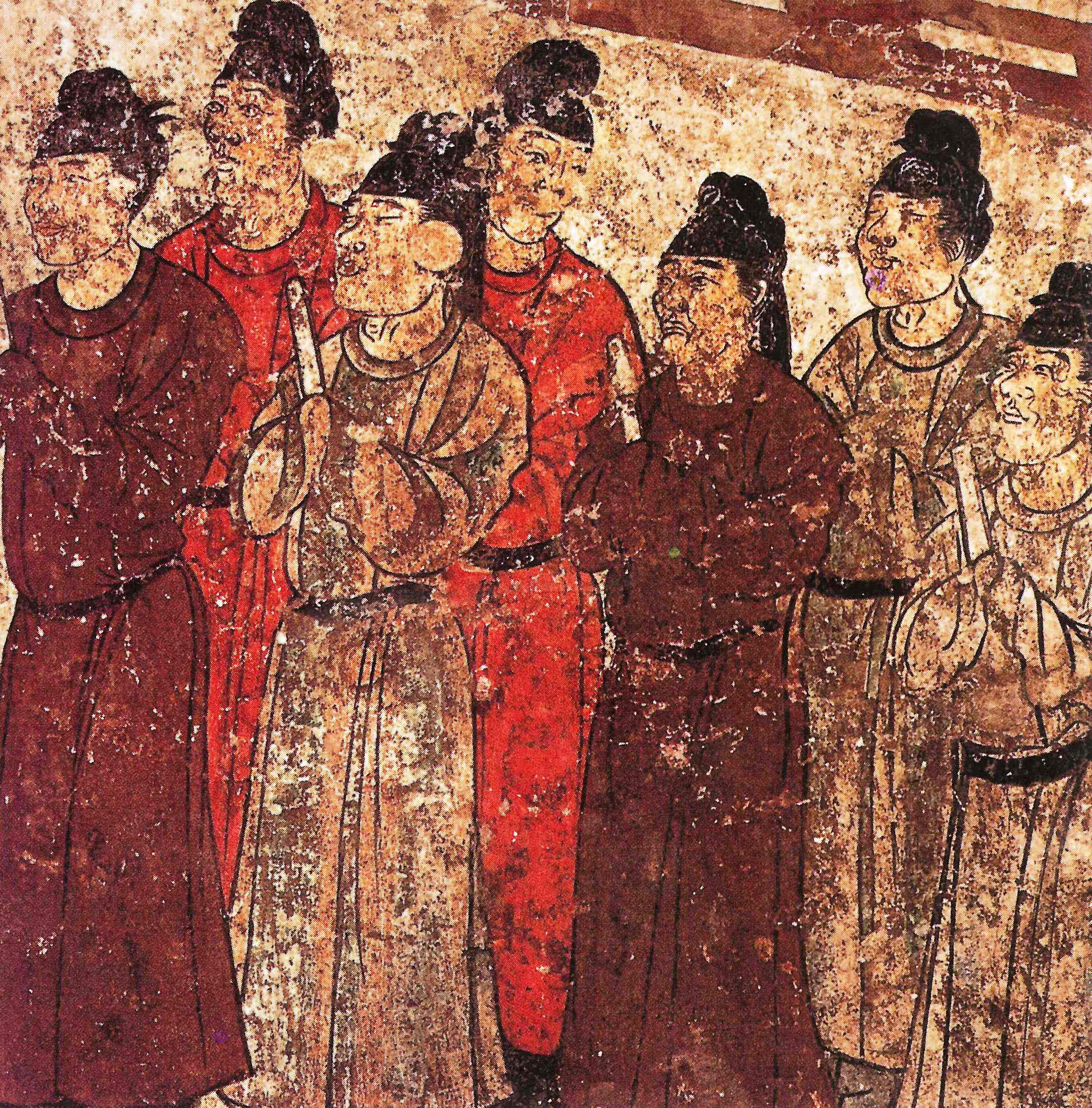
Tang dynasty mural of eunuchs holding a hu.

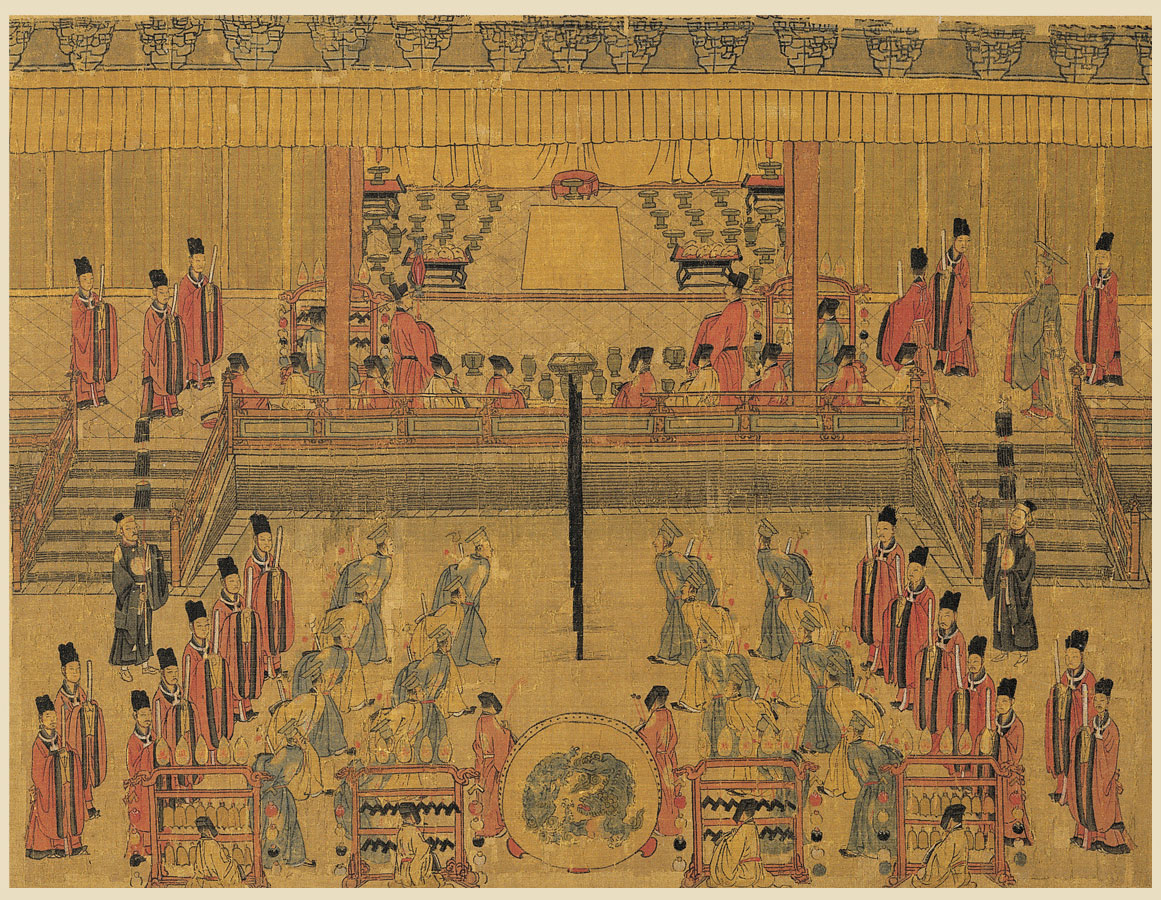
Song dynasty Illustrations of the Classic of Filial Piety showing officials wearing chaofu engaged in ritual ceremony, holding a hu.

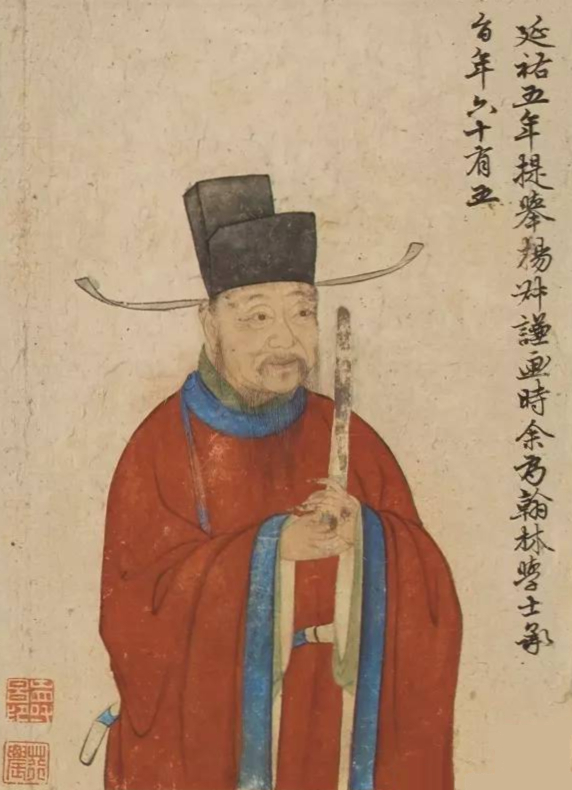
Zhao Mengfu of the Yuan dynasty holding a hu

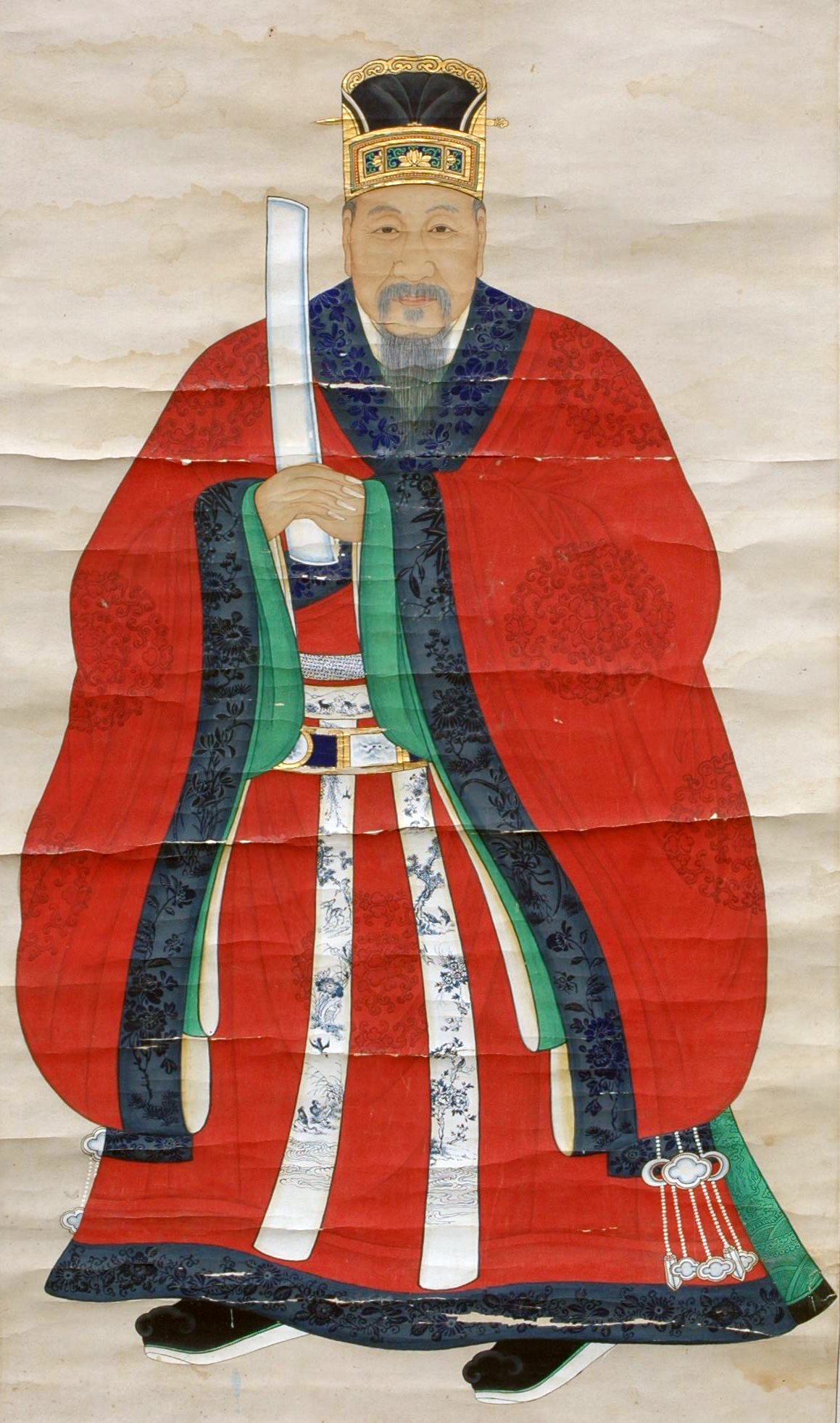
Ming dynasty official Shi Baoshan wearing a chaofu and holding a hu.

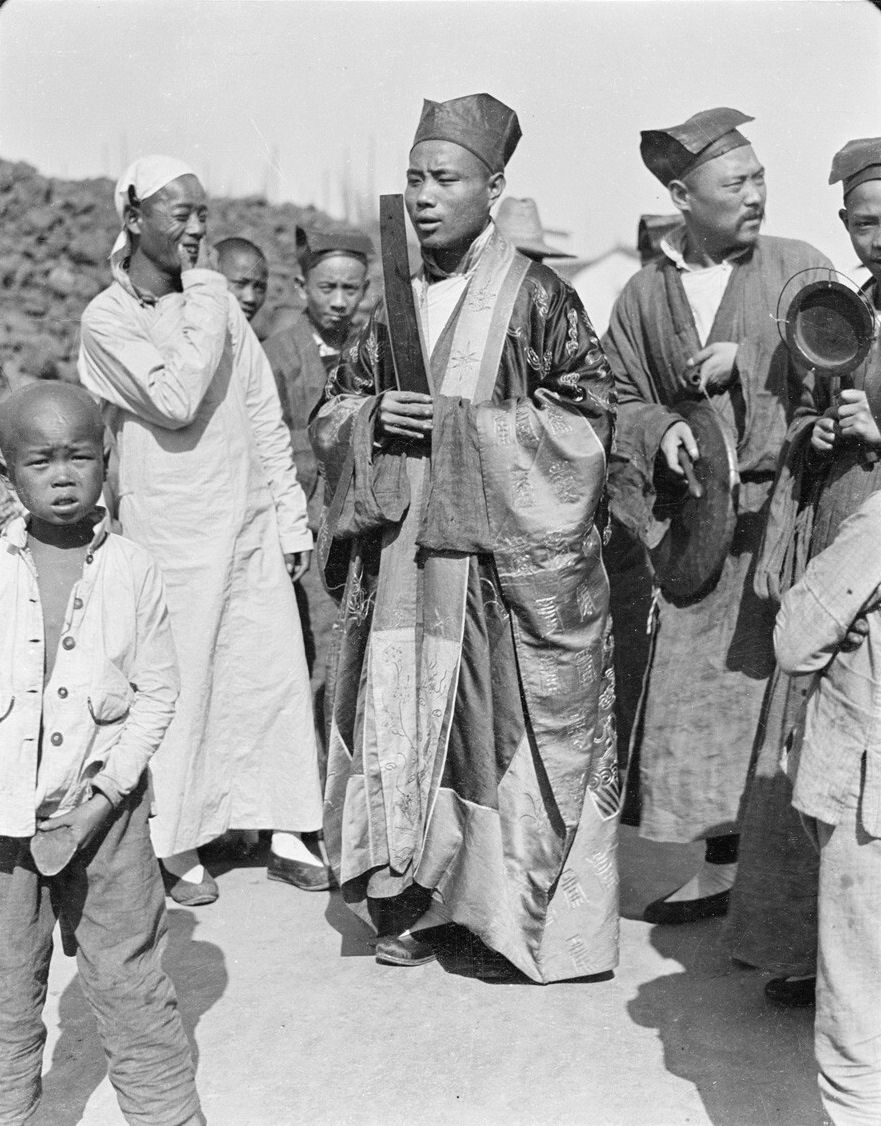
Taoist priest wearing a fayi and holding a ritual hu.

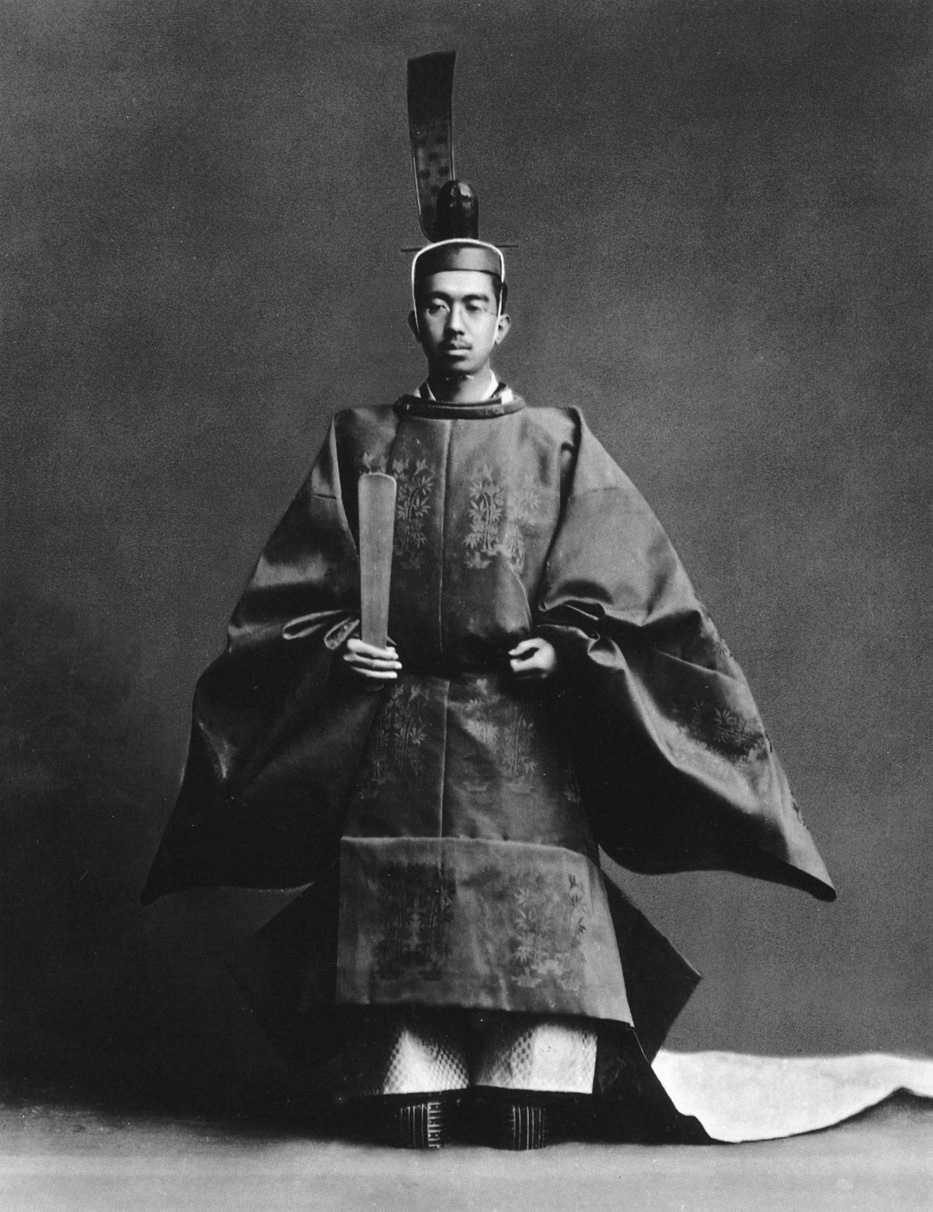
Emperor Showa wearing a sokutai and holding a shaku.

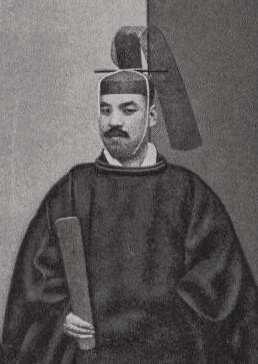
Prince Kuni Taka holding a shaku, Japan.

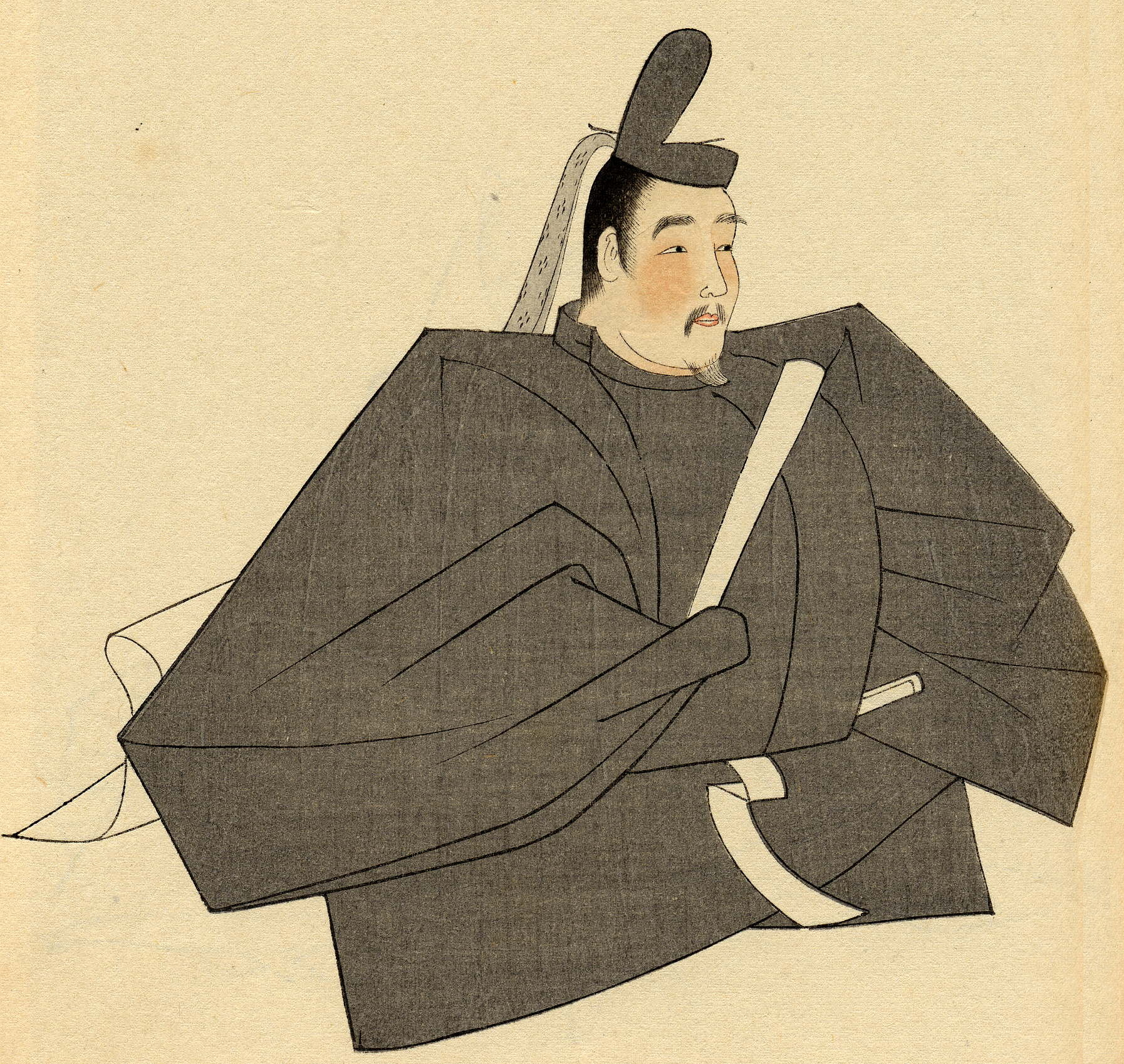
Shogun Minamoto no Sanetomo, Japan

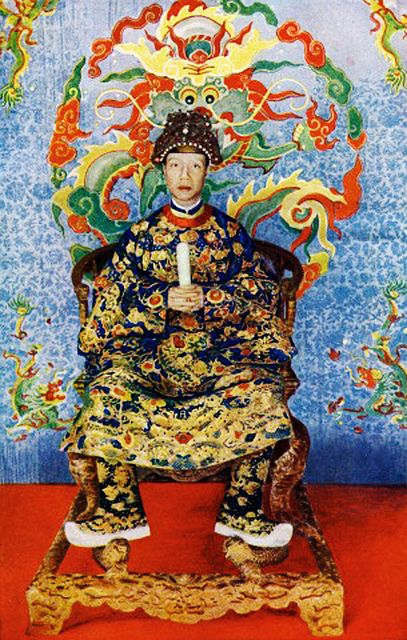
Vietnamese Emperor Khai Dinh in court attire holding a hốt

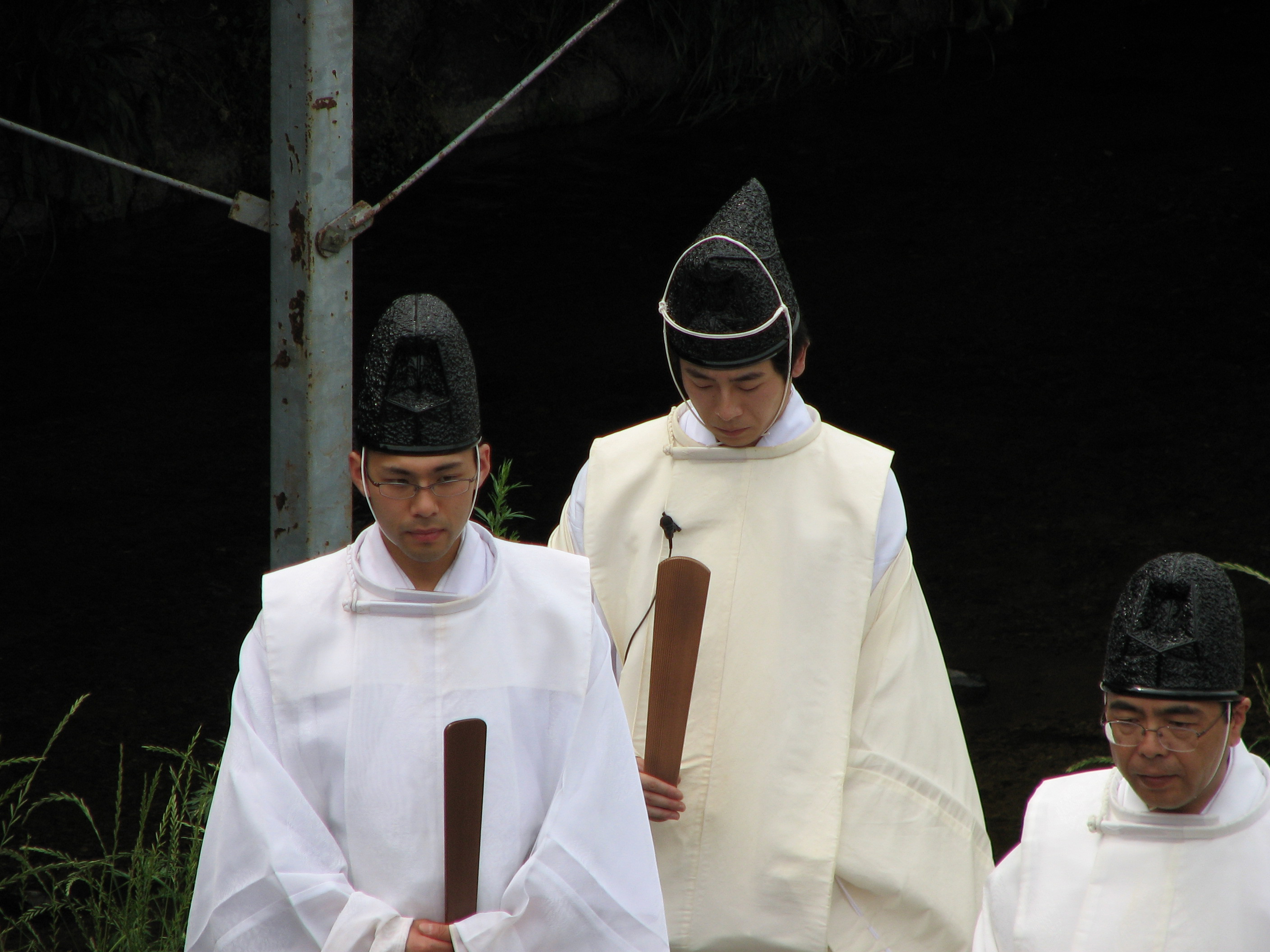
Two kannushi in Kyoto, Japan

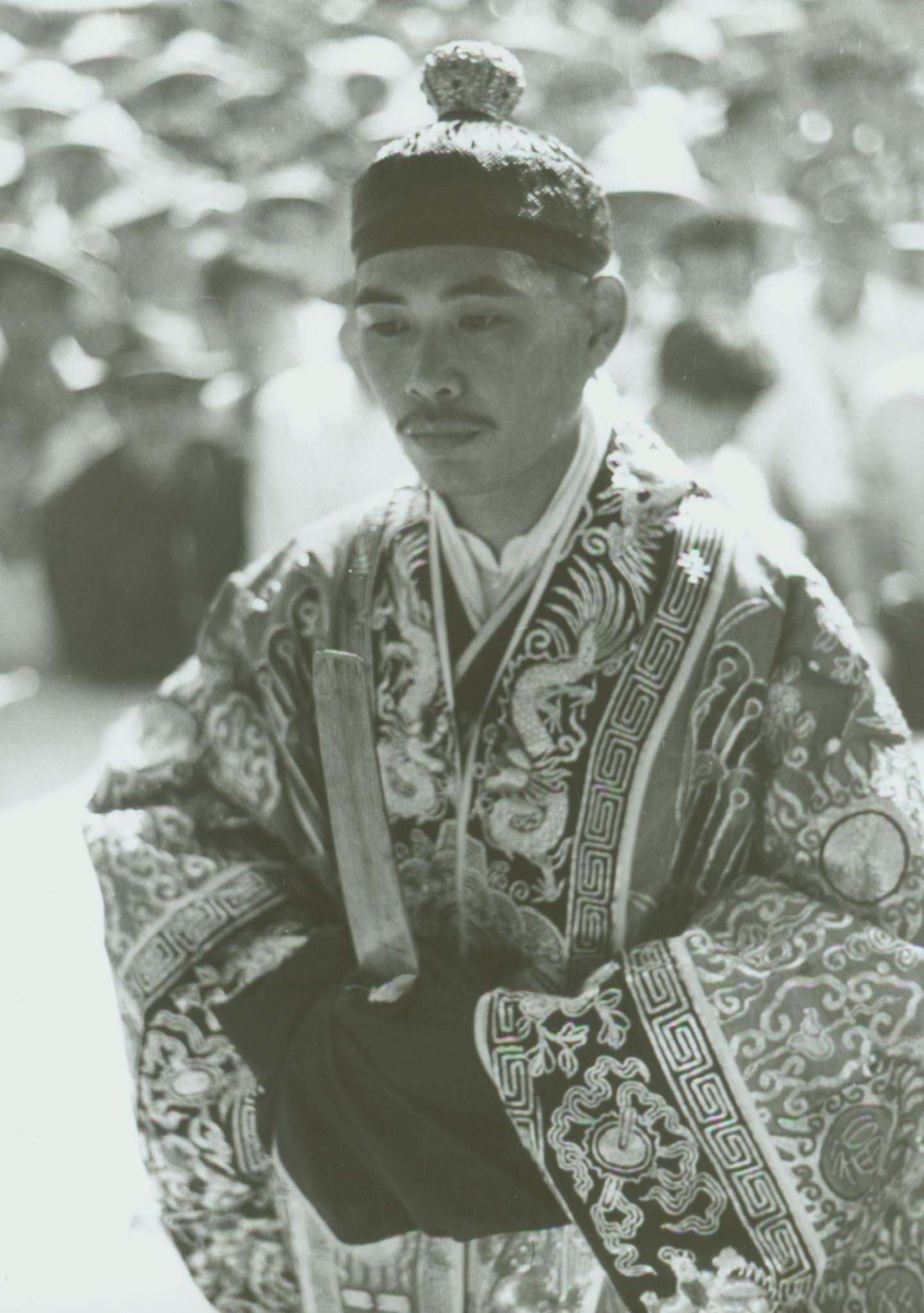
A Daoist priest in Gangshan, Taiwan

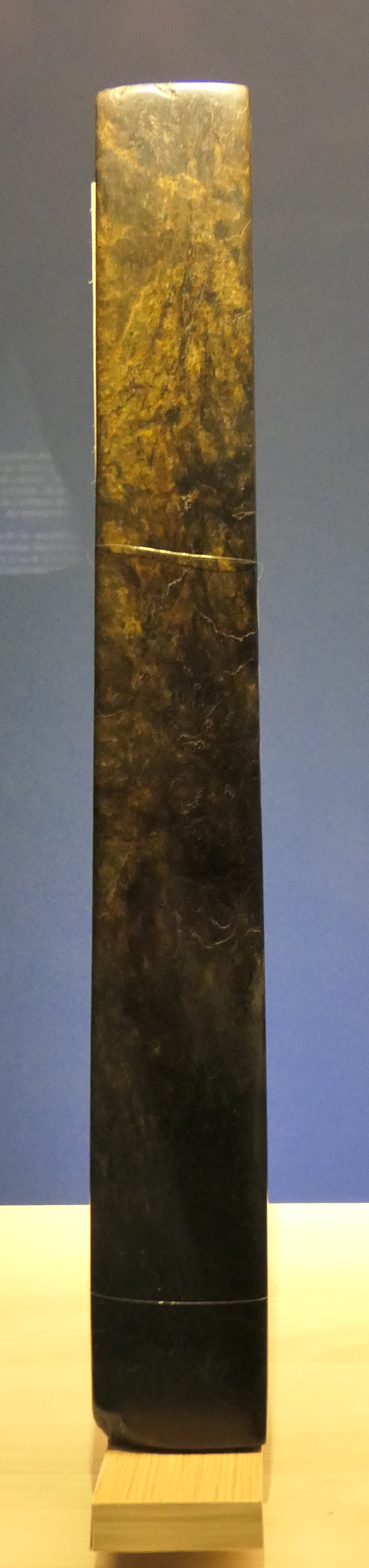
A hu made of jade which belonged to Zhu Shugui, the Prince of Ningjing

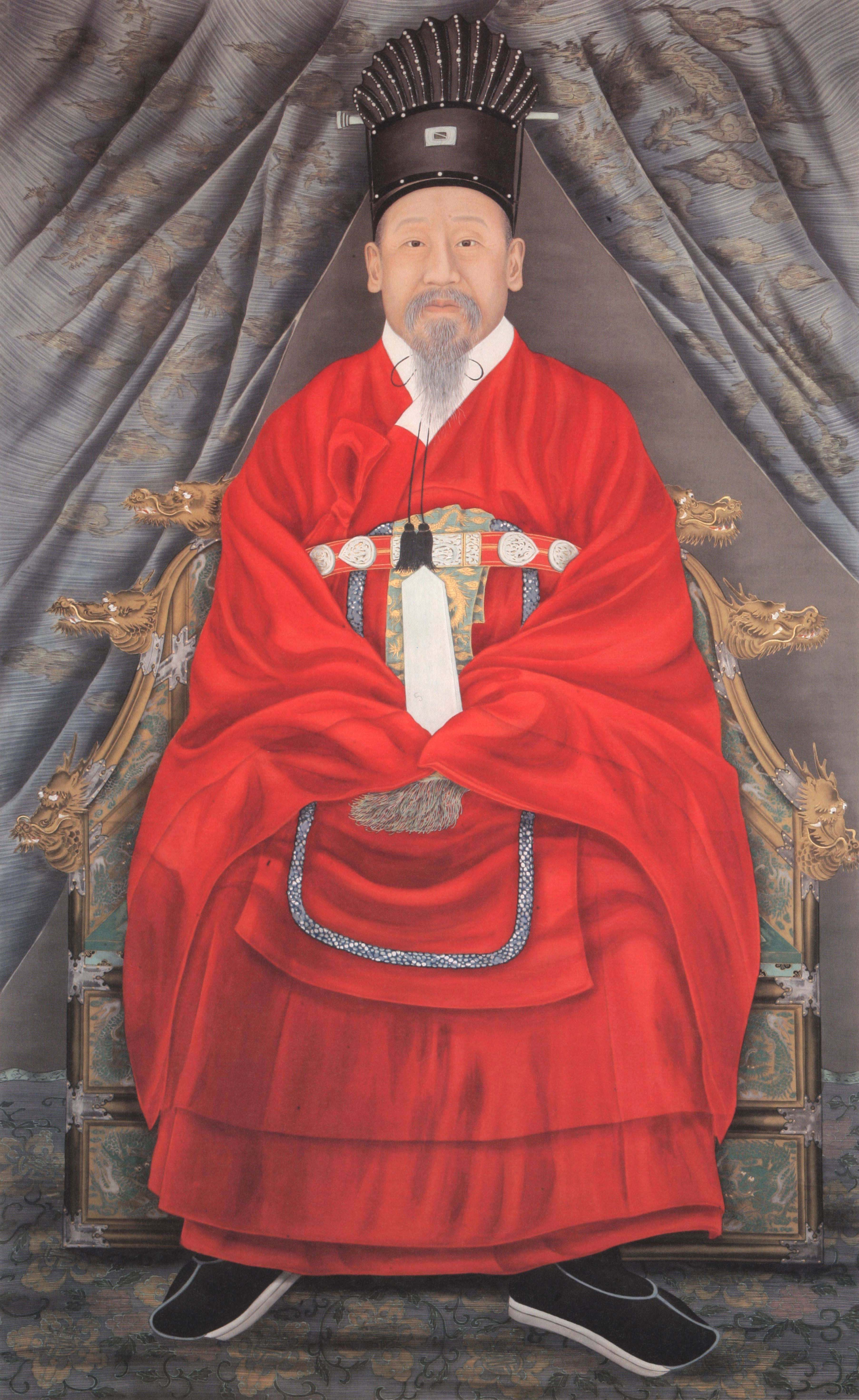
Portrait of Joseon Emperor Gojong wearing hanbok and holding a hol

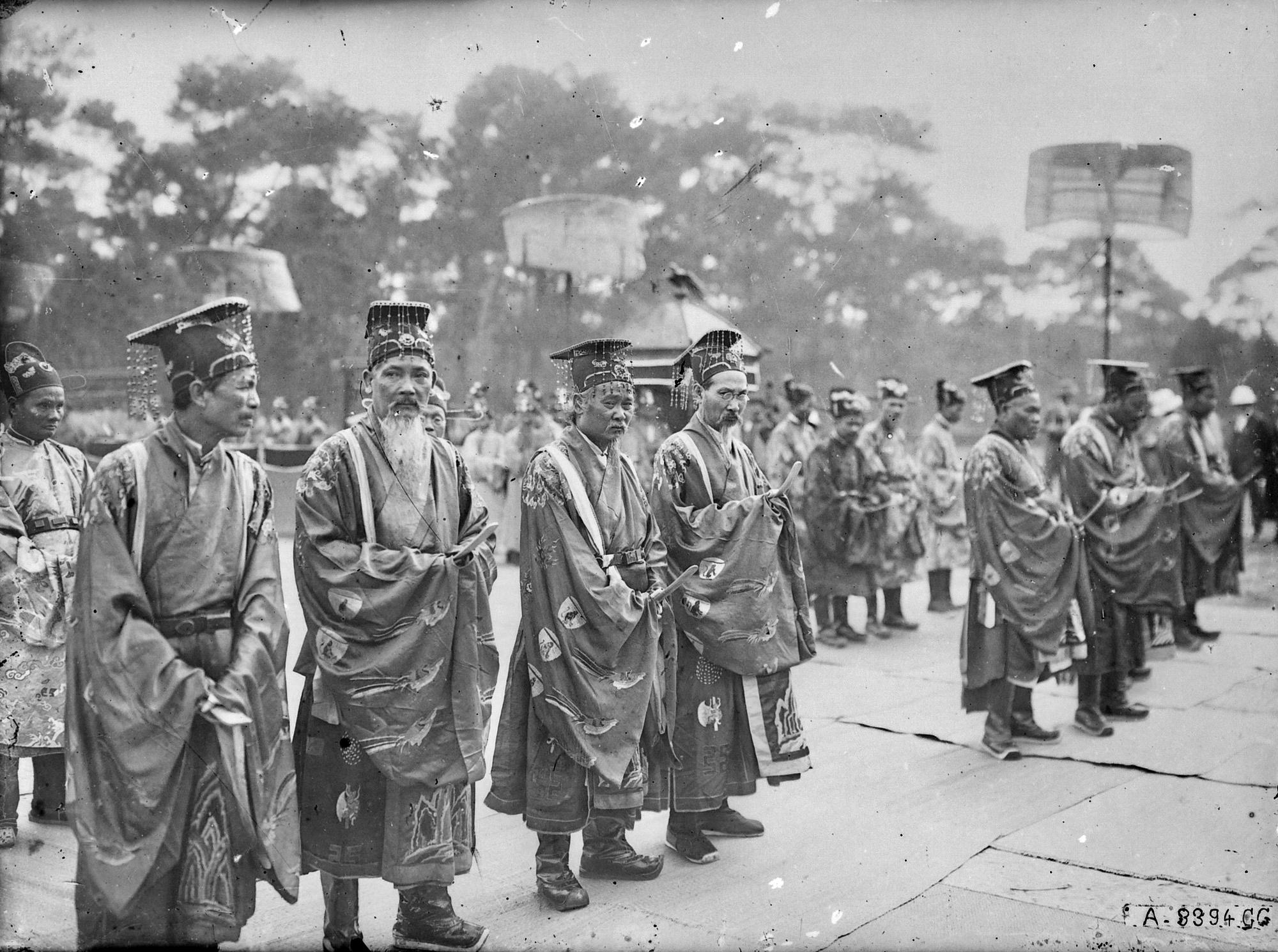
Vietnamese officials holding hốt during the Nam Giao ceremony.

== See also ==
- Gohei
- Gunbai
- Ōnusa
- Ruyi (scepter)
- Saihai
- Sceptre
