= The Bard's Tale II: The Destiny Knight =

1986 video game

- Cover art by Jonny C. Kwan
- Developers: Interplay Productions; Krome Studios (remaster)
- Publishers: Electronic Arts; Pony Canyon, Inc. (NES, PC-98) inXile Entertainment (remaster)
- Producer: Joe Ybarra
- Designer: Michael Cranford
- Artist: Todd J. Camasta
- Composer: David Warhol
- Series: The Bard's Tale
- Platforms: Amiga, Apple II, Apple IIGS, Commodore 64, Commodore 128, MS-DOS, Famicom/NES, PC-98
- Release: 1986: C64; 1987: Apple II; 1988: Amiga, IIGS, MS-DOS; 1991: PC-98; 1992: NES
- Genre: Role-playing
- Mode: Single-player

The Bard's Tale II: The Destiny Knight (or The Bard's Tale 2) is a fantasy role-playing video game created by Interplay Productions in 1986. It is the first sequel to The Bard's Tale, and the last game of the series that was designed and programmed by Michael Cranford.

The game features Dungeons & Dragons-style characters and follows in the footsteps of its predecessor, The Bard's Tale, also created by Michael Cranford. The Bard's Tale II takes place on a larger scale with an explorable wilderness, six cities, and multiple dungeons that give this game its dungeon crawl character. The game has new features such as casinos and banks, and introduces a new magic user called an Archmage, among other changes from the first game in the series.

Although it received mixed reviews upon release, The Bard's Tale II won the Origins Award for Best Fantasy or Science Fiction Computer Game of 1986. In 2018, Krome Studios published a "remastered edition" as part of The Bard's Tale Remastered Trilogy.

== Plot ==
In The Bard's Tale II, players lead a band of adventurers searching for seven pieces of the broken Destiny Wand in The Realm. Mercenaries roaming the land stand in the way. Players achieve victory after finding the pieces, defeating the Archmage Lagoth Zanta, and reforging the Wand. The character who successfully reforges the Wand becomes the immortal Destiny Knight.

After the optional "starter dungeon" in Tangramayne—available to develop fledgling characters—players pursue the segments of the Destiny Wand. Parties progress through dungeons, to include The Tombs, Fanskar's Fortress, Dargoth's Castle, the Maze of Dread, Oscon's Fortress, the Grey Crypt, and the Destiny Stone. Players can obtain segments in a Snare in each dungeon. After acquiring the seventh segment, players are ready to assemble the Destiny Wand and face their final battle with Lagoth Zanta.

=== Setting and characters ===
The Bard's Tale II is set in "The Realm", which has been peaceful for 700 years. Peace was maintained by the Destiny Wand, forged by the Archmage Turin, until it was stolen and broken. The game features a large wilderness area and six cities—Colosse, Corinth, Ephesus, Philippi, Tangramayne, and Thessalonica. Each city comprises similar features such as taverns and banks. Cities also contain dungeon entrances.

Players can assemble a party of up to seven active characters at the Adventurer's Guild in each city. Characters can be imported or created. They can be imported from The Bard's Tale, Wizardry: Proving Grounds of the Mad Overlord (on Apple II versions), or Ultima III: Exodus. Characters can be created as a human, elf, dwarf, hobbit, half-elf, half-orc, or gnome. Players can also include monsters indefinitely in the party—only a temporary feature in The Bard's Tale.

Character classes available at the start are the warrior, paladin, rogue, bard, hunter, monk, conjurer, and magician. The sorcerer, wizard, and archmage classes are not available at the start. Archmages are a new class. Creating an archmage requires at least three levels in the four other magic-user classes. Character attributes (strength, intelligence, dexterity, constitution, and luck) are generated randomly during character creation (with values from 1–18) and affect gameplay. Empty character slots can also be filled with players or creatures through random encounters, spells, or the use of figurines. The game's namesake, the Bard, retains magical singing abilities. The seven available songs assist the party while exploring or fighting.

== Gameplay ==
Gameplay screenshot (Apple II)

The Destiny Knight shares a similar interface with the first game. Besides the character list, there is a visual interface on the left with interactive text on the right. Graphics are similar, with some updates such as animated character images. Sounds such as Bard songs also have more depth. (Note: Hartley and Patricia Lesser highlighted the audio improvements on the Amiga version. They point to the "Gregorian chant" in temples during character healing and note that Bard songs reflect the instruments in use by the character.) Gameplay has similar aspects to Dungeons & Dragons. It appeals to players who enjoy dungeon crawling and mapping.

Combat has more depth than Bard's Tale I. Range extends to 90 feet. Handheld weapons are useful at close range. Extended ranges involve ranged weapons like bow and arrows and spells which change effects over distance. (Note: The game's "advance" command allows parties to bring monster groups into range of handheld weapons, or "melee" range.) In the early stages of the game, the party's fighters are important in combat, while spellcasters are dominant later due to monster strength. Some powerful monsters have over 1,000 hit points.

Magic is part of gameplay. The game features 79 spells. These include battle magic as well as other spells such as teleport, the reliable "Scry Site" spell (providing the party's location), light spells, and summoning monsters as allies. The party's spellcasters typically occupy the bottom character slots, allowing them to use magic with the fighters in front. (Note: The first four character slots are inside melee range while slots 5–7 are outside.) Besides magic users, some items also cast spells. Parties must develop an archmage to achieve game success.

Parties can explore the wilderness, cities, and dungeons. The wilderness contains monsters not seen in The Bard's Tale. Players can also discover non-player characters such as the Sage who provides useful advice, for a price. Players can avoid wilderness movement by teleporting between cities with a spell.

Cities vary only in their internal layout. They feature various establishments, two of which did not appear in The Bard's Tale—banks and casinos. At Garth's Equipment Shoppe, players can buy, sell, or identify items. Parties can withdraw saved money from an account at Bedder's Bank for the Bold and gamble it at a casino. They can lament their gambling losses at a tavern over a drink with bartender advice available, for a price. When ready, a party can venture into a dungeon to explore, fight monsters, and gain the experience to advance levels and complete their quest. After returning to town, parties can heal or revive characters at a temple. Roscoe's Energy Emporium allows spell unit restoration at exorbitant fees. Characters advance levels and magical ability at the Review Board. There are also "unmarked buildings", most with little but a possible monster encounter.

The game has 25 dungeon levels. Dungeon exploration identifies clues which are important to solving the game's puzzles. Dungeons feature hazards such as spinners, teleports, and areas that drain the party and prevent magic use, among others. Lack of light and other hazards in later dungeons make mapping challenging, although there is an automap feature in the game's remastered version.

Central to gameplay are Snares of Death, which did not appear in The Bard's Tale. In-game research and preparation are required for successful completion. There are seven of these challenging snares, appearing in the various dungeons. Once entered, parties cannot leave until they are solved. These real-time puzzles have a time limit. Little light works in these magic-free zones. Solving one of these puzzles provides the party with a segment of the Destiny Wand, while failure results in their demise. Only an archmage can assemble the Destiny Wand.

== Development ==
=== 1980s release ===
The initial The Bard's Tale II release was part of a series of evolving 1980s fantasy role-playing video games. Drawing from Advanced Dungeons & Dragons' roots in the 1970s, these included the Wizardry and Ultima series. The game followed the Bard's Tale I's 1985 release. Work began as soon as The Bard's Tale was complete. Additional disks allowed for a game larger in scope. According to reviewer John Ryan in 1989, "By the time Bard's Tale II: Destiny Knight ... appeared in 1986, it found an active gaming public with a voracious appetite for more of the saga." Improving on the graphics and plotline of its predecessor, the game quickly found commercial success after release.

Interplay Productions produced The Destiny Knight as the next installment in The Bard's Tale series. Michael Cranford designed the game. Development drew from themes in The Lord of the Rings. Electronic Arts first published the game on the Commodore 64. The game later expanded to the Apple II system and the Atari ST. Initial release was December 1986. It was also published on the Amiga. (Note: Release dates included: Apple II in 1987; MS-DOS, Amiga, and Apple IIgs in 1988; PC-98 in 1991, and the Nintendo Entertainment System in 1992.) It was followed by The Bard's Tale III: Thief of Fate, published in March 1988.

== Reception ==
Reception

Review scores
Publication	Score
Computer Magazine (German)	Graphics: 79; Sound and Music: 38; Happy Rating: 89
MobyGames	7.7
Old Game Hermit	55
RUN	A

The Bard's Tale II won the Origins Award for Best Fantasy or Science Fiction Computer Game of 1986.

Critical reception was mixed. In Computer Gaming World, Scorpia noted several improvements over the original, such as an easier start and more easily recognizable buildings. However, she thought the snares excessively tedious, interactions with the Sage challenging, and the gameplay skewed heavily in favor of mages. Her verdict was "recommended, with reservations". In a 1991 review, Scorpia called the game "without a doubt, the worst of the series". Reviewer James Trunzo echoed Scorpia's comments about excessive repetition in snares and frustrating interaction with the Sage, requiring precise wording of questions.

Charles Ardai called it "a fine sequel to Bard's Tale". RUN magazine reviewer Bob Guerra praised the game's new enemies and their corresponding animations and stated the game "offers an irresistible challenge to all fans of role-playing fantasies." James Trunzo stated in Compute! that Bard's Tale II "lives up to its predecessor's excellent reputation". The magazine described the game as one "for the true adventure gamer. It is a very difficult and challenging game, and it requires great intestinal fortitude", and suggested that beginning adventurers avoid it. Ahoy!'s AmigaUser said "Bard's Tale II is a completely worthy successor to the 1986 award-winner. It is at least as good as the first title in the series, except where it is even better".

Hartley and Patricia Lesser reviewed the game in a 1987 issue of Dragon magazine. They indicated that fans of The Bard's Tale would like this sequel much better. They stated that its "scope is mammoth in nature, and this is another highly recommended offering for all fantasy role-players". Michael Bagnall also stated in 1987 that due to the number of new features, "It is its own game, whose design is familiar enough that veterans can leap right in, yet with so many unique elements that it will challenge and enthrall them even more than the original."

== Legacy ==
During the 2015 Kickstarter campaign for The Bard's Tale IV: Barrows Deep, inXile partnered with Rebecca Heineman and her company Olde Sküül to remaster the original trilogy for modern personal computers running Mac OS and Microsoft Windows (verus inXile's emulated versions). After reaching an impasse in development, Olde Sküül and inXile agreed to transfer the project to Krome Studios.

On October 23, 2018, Krome Studios released a remastered version of The Destiny Knight as part of a series remake. This updated the graphics and added an automap feature, among other updates. A legacy mode version of the game was later added.

The remastered edition of the original trilogy was released for Xbox One on August 13, 2019. This followed the acquisition of inXile Entertainment by Microsoft. The collection supports Xbox Play Anywhere. The game was also published for the PC-98 in September 1991 and the Nintendo Entertainment System platform in January 1992.

=== Reception ===
In 2018, Alex Santa Maria stated that The Destiny Knight was part of "One of the most classic franchises in PC gaming". An Old Game Hermit reviewer in 2020 rated the game at 55 of 100, noting repetition as a drawback. He placed the game at "extreme" difficulty while noting that "the feeling of accomplishment you receive from finally conquering a game like this is unmatched". In 2023, Scott Orgera listed the Bard's Tale trilogy, including The Destiny Knight, as one of the "10 Best Offline RPGs to Play in 2023" as the "Best Old-School RPG".

== See also ==
- Silversword

== Bibliography ==
- "The 1986 Origins Awards". The Game Manufacturers Association. Archived from the original on December 16, 2012.
- Ardai, Charles (May 1987). "Titans of the Computer Gaming World / Part II of V: Ardai on Electronic Arts". Computer Gaming World. p. 28.
- Bagnall, Michael (March 1987). "Bard's Tale II: The Destiny Knight". Questbusters: The Adventurer's Journal. Vol. IV, no. 3. pp. 1, 9.
- Bagnall, Michael R. (1988). Addams, Shay (ed.). Quest for Clues. New Hampshire: Origin Systems. ISBN 0-929373-00-6.
- Contributors (2023). "The Bard's Tale II: The Destiny Knight". Moby Games.
- Cranford, Michael (October 22, 2018). "The Bard's Tale Trilogy "The Destiny Knight" Launch Trailer". inXile Entertainment.
- Editor (April 20, 2020). "Review: The Bard's Tale II – The Destiny Knight". Old Game Hermit.
- Editors. "The Destiny Knight". Computer Magazine.
- Guerra, Bob (April 1987). "The Bard's Tale II, The Destiny Knight: In Search of Good, Evil and The Destiny Wand". RUN. Vol. 4, no. 4. Peterborough, NH: CW Communications/Peterborough. pp. 18, 24. ISSN 0741-4285. OCLC 10151803.
- "Keys to the Kingdom Special: Destiny Knight". Questbusters: The Adventurer's Journal. Vol. IV, no. 3. March 1987. p. 6.
- Lesser, Hartley; Lesser, Patricia (April 1987). "The Role of Computers: Of the Bard and Other Tales". Dragon. No. 120. pp. 79–82.
- Madan, Asher (August 13, 2019). "Cult Classic 'The Bard's Tale Trilogy' Warps on Xbox One, Supports Xbox Play Anywhere". Windows Central.
- Maria, Alex (October 23, 2018). "The Bard's Tale II: The Destiny Knight Joins Remastered Original". Game Revolution.
- Mazagalli, Paul (May 17, 2018). "The Bard Takes Some Questions!". Kickstarter.
- Moby Games (2023). "Bard's Tale Series: Commodore 64". Moby Games.
- Moby Games (2023). "The Bard's Tale II: The Destiny Knight". Moby Games.
- Morris, Nathan (2022). "The Bard's Tale II: The Destiny Knight – Guide and Walkthrough". GameFAQs.
- Orgera, Scott (January 25, 2023). "10 Best Offline RPGs to Play in 2023". Lifewire.
- Poverello Media (2004). "The People Behind the Bard's Tale Legacy". The Bard's Tale Compendium.
- Ryan, John (August 1989). "Games Gallery: From Board Game to Mainframe to Personal Computer, Here's a Look at the Evolution of Fantasy Role-Playing Games". RUN. Vol. 6, no. 8. CW Communications/Peterborough. pp. 55–57.
- Sarkar, Samit (June 11, 2015). "The Bard's Tale 4 Kickstarter Backers to Receive Original Bard's Tale Trilogy Free". Polygon.
- Scorpia (June–July 1987). "The Bard's Tale II: The Destiny Knight Review". Computer Gaming World. No. 38. pp. 22–25, 54.
- Scorpia (October 1991). "C*R*P*G*S / Computer Role-Playing Game Survey". Computer Gaming World. p. 16.
- Scorpia (October 1993). "Scorpia's Magic Scroll Of Games". Computer Gaming World. pp. 34–50.
- Simerly, David K. (1986). The Bard's Tale II: The Manual. San Mateo: Electronic Arts.
- Trunzo, James V. (October 1987). "The Bard's Tale II: The Destiny Knight". Compute!. p. 31.
