= The Bard's Tale =

Fantasy role-playing video game franchise

- Genre: Role-playing
- Developers: Interplay Productions; inXile Entertainment
- Publisher: Electronic Arts
- First release: The Bard's Tale; 1985
- Latest release: The Bard's Tale: Warlocks of Largefearn; 2022

The Bard's Tale is a fantasy role-playing video game franchise created by Michael Cranford and developed by Brian Fargo's Interplay Productions (1985–1992) and inXile Entertainment (2004–present). The initial title of the series was Tales of the Unknown. The Bard's Tale II: The Destiny Knight dropped the Tales of the Unknown series title, as did all ports of the original game after 1988. From then on, the series was known as The Bard's Tale series. Both Cranford and Fargo have refuted the assertion that the original projected titles for the second and third installments were The Archmage's Tale and The Thief's Tale.

After the first three games, work on a fourth installment began but it became an unrelated game, Dragon Wars, at a very late point in development due to rights issues when Interplay parted ways with their publisher. The series was not continued for many years and is thus still often referred to as the "Bard's Tale trilogy". In 2018, Alex Santa Maria stated that The Bard's Tale was "One of the most classic franchises in PC gaming".

== Games ==
Release timeline
1985	Tales of the Unknown: The Bard's Tale
1986	The Bard's Tale II: The Destiny Knight
1987
1988	The Bard's Tale III: Thief of Fate
1989
1990
1991	The Bard's Tale Construction Set
1992
1993
1994
1995
1996
1997
1998
1999
2000
2001
2002
2003
2004	The Bard's Tale
2005
2006
2007
2008
2009
2010
2011
2012
2013
2014
2015
2016
2017	The Mage's Tale
2018	The Bard's Tale IV: Barrows Deep; The Bard's Tale Remastered Trilogy
2019
2020
2021
2022	The Bard's Tale: Warlocks of Largefearn

- Tales of the Unknown: The Bard's Tale (1985): In the series' eponymous first game, the evil wizard Mangar has cast a spell of eternal winter on the small country town of Skara Brae to isolate it, and the player controls a group of adventurers who seek to find and defeat Mangar to free the town.
- The Bard's Tale II: The Destiny Knight (1986): To save the realm, the group must find the seven pieces of the Destiny Wand, reforge it (so that an Archmage from the group can become the legendary Destiny Knight), and confront the evil Archmage Lagoth Zanta.
- The Bard's Tale III: Thief of Fate (1988): The mad god Tarjan, Mangar's master, has returned to Skara Brae and destroyed the city, though as it turns out this was only a small facet of his revenge. In their attempt to stop Tarjan, the group becomes embroiled in a war among gods across several dimensions.
- The Bard's Tale Construction Set (1991), a game creation system that allows for the creation of dungeon crawl video games based on the Bard's Tale game engine.
- The Bard's Tale (2004): Action role-playing video game created by Brian Fargo and published by Fargo's InXile Entertainment; not a proper part of the original series. Brian Fargo only had the rights to the name but not to the content/stories of the earlier games in the Bard's Tale series at that point.
- The Mage's Tale (2017): A side-story game set in the Bard's Tale universe, developed by inXile alongside The Bard's Tale IV and released in 2017. Like other games in the series, it is a first-person dungeon crawler, but is built for virtual reality, featuring action-based spellcasting, rather than turn-based combat.
- The Bard's Tale IV: Barrows Deep (2018): A proper fourth part of the original series was successfully funded as a Kickstarter project in 2015 by InXile Entertainment, and released in 2018. Two centuries after the initial trilogy's events, a primordial evil seeks to free itself and must be stopped—and Skara Brae, as it turns out, is located just above the critical place for this.
  While continuing the story from the original trilogy, the game significantly expanded and reframed the existing lore such as it was in the old games, and the actual gameplay was completely overhauled and is arguably more similar to the 2004 game than to the first three games.
- The Bard's Tale Remastered Trilogy (2018): A spinoff project of the Bard's Tale IV project, the Remastered Trilogy is a re-creation of the original trilogy for modern computers, with updated graphics and user interface, bugfixes, and other quality-of-life improvements. The games were also expanded slightly, to retroactively connect them to the plot and expanded setting of Bard's Tale IV.
- The Bard’s Tale: Warlocks of Largefearn (2022): A spinoff voice-driven game developed by Polar Night Studio for Amazon Alexa, Google Assistant, IOS and Android. Features a semi-open world, taking place in the settlement town of Largefearn. Includes several companions to recruit and a turn and tile-based combat system.

== Books ==
=== Cluebooks ===
Official Cluebooks were published by Electronic Arts for the first three Bard's Tale games. These untitled books expanded on the games' stories and added new characters:

The cluebook for the first game (1986, ISBN 1-55543-064-3) was written by T.L. Thompson as an in-universe document, the journal of a lord who had very nearly succeeded in solving the quest before finding that his party had lost crucial items required to overcome the final hurdle. The party was implicitly wiped out just short of defeating Mangar but had seen to it that the journal would reach friendly hands.

The cluebook for the second game (1987) was written by T.L. Thompson and David K. Similarly as a short story, narrating how a party of adventurers asks a wizard to foretell their (possible) future by means of a divination spell, if they should attempt the game's quest to find the Destiny Wand and defeat Lagoth Zanta. The resulting trance vision of the possible future reflects poorly on the character of the group's leader, who is also shown to get assassinated at the end, and it is implied that this particular group will thus not embark on the quest after all even though they technically succeeded in the vision.

The cluebook for the third game (1988, ISBN 1-55543-236-0) was written by David Luoto in the style of a novella. The protagonist, Arbo, is initially a lazy and useless squire who is "volunteered" by his master to a party of adventurers at Skara Brae. The group proceeds to bring order to the dimensions and best Tarjan, and in the process form Arbo into a resourceful and responsible adult.

=== Novels ===
A series of novels based on The Bard's Tale were published by Baen Books during the 1990s. They include:

1. Castle of Deception, by Mercedes Lackey and Josepha Sherman (1992, ISBN 0-671-72125-9)
2. Fortress of Frost and Fire, by Mercedes Lackey and Ru Emerson (1993, ISBN 0-671-72162-3)
3. Prison of Souls, by Mercedes Lackey and Mark Shepherd (1994, ISBN 0-671-72193-3)
4. The Chaos Gate, by Josepha Sherman (1994, ISBN 0-671-87597-3)
5. Thunder of the Captains, by Holly Lisle and Aaron Allston (1996, ISBN 0-671-87731-3)
6. Wrath of the Princes, by Holly Lisle and Aaron Allston (1997, ISBN 0-671-87771-2)
7. Escape from Roksamur, by Mark Shepherd (1997, ISBN 0-671-87797-6)
8. Curse of the Black Heron, by Holly Lisle (1998, ISBN 0-671-87868-9)

While they are listed here in the order they were published, some books in the series connect more than others, such as Castle of Deception and The Chaos Gate, Prison of Souls and Escape from Roksamur, and Thunder of the Captains and Wrath of the Princes.

As part of the crowdfunding campaign for The Bard's Tale IV, six novels set within the redefined setting from The Bard's Tale IV and the Remastered edition of the original trilogy were provided to backers in EPUB format in 2018. Three of them are novelized re-tellings of the first three games' storylines by Nathan Long, who wrote the storyline for part four. They follow a group of six heroes as they proceed through the first three games' storylines, reframing the original trilogy within the larger story. Compared to the games or earlier cluebooks, they are written with considerable artistic license, omitting or altering many details.

1. The Bard's Tale, by Nathan Long
2. The Destiny Knight, by Nathan Long
3. The Thief of Fate, by Nathan Long
4. Paladin, by Elizabeth Watasin (describes the background of Bryan of Dorn, a character within The Bard's Tale IV who can be recruited into the party)
5. Promises Made by Moonlight, by Mike Lee (describes the background of Sybale, a character within The Bard's Tale IV who can be recruited into the party)
6. The Song Thief, by Jason Denzel (describes an adventure by Fiona the Harper, a character within The Bard's Tale IV who can be recruited into the party; prominently features songs about Lady Svante, a character from Nathan Long's retelling of the first three games in the trilogy, as well as a spell book that once belonged to Soriac the Archmage, a character from the original cluebook for the first game)

== Reception ==
By 2003, The Bard's Tale series had sold over a million copies.

In 1996, Next Generation listed the series (referring to the first three parts of the original trilogy plus the construction set at the time) collectively as number 62 on their "Top 100 Games of All Time", praising the all-in-one interface using multiple display windows and the unparalleled level of plot detail and development. In 2018, Alex Santa Maria stated that it was "One of the most classic franchises in PC gaming".

== See also ==
- Dragon Wars – 1989 video game
- Silversword – 2012 iOS video game
- Swords and Serpents – 1990 role-playing video game
