= Silver Sword =

Silver Sword or Silversword may refer to:

== Botany ==
- Argyroxiphium, a genus of plants in the sunflower family Asteraceae
- Silversword alliance, an adaptive radiation of around 30 species in the sunflower family Asteraceae

== Entertainment ==
- The Silver Sword, a 1956 novel by Ian Serraillier
- Silversword, a 2011 fantasy role-playing game
- Silversword (character), a supervillain in the DC Comics universe
- The original title of the 1992 video game Wizards & Warriors III: Kuros: Visions of Power
- Silversword, a novel by American author Phyllis A. Whitney

== Other uses ==
- Silverswords, the athletic teams that represent Chaminade University of Honolulu, Hawaii
