= The Bard's Tale (1985 video game) =

Fantasy role-playing video game

- Developers: Interplay Productions; Krome Studios (remaster)
- Publishers: NA: Electronic Arts; EU: Ariolasoft; inXile Entertainment (remaster)
- Designer: Michael Cranford
- Series: The Bard's Tale
- Platforms: Amiga, Amstrad CPC, Apple II, Apple IIGS, Atari ST, Commodore 64, MS-DOS, Mac, NES, PC-98, Windows, Xbox One, ZX Spectrum
- Release: Apple II, Commodore 64: NA: December 1985; Windows; 2018; Xbox One; 2019
- Genre: Role-playing
- Mode: Single-player

The Bard's Tale is a 1985 fantasy role-playing video game designed and programmed by Michael Cranford for Interplay Productions and published by Electronic Arts for the Apple II. Set in the fictional city of Skara Brae, which has been engulfed in eternal winter and overrun by monsters due to a spell cast by the evil wizard, Mangar the Dark, the game tasks players with assembling and leading a party of up to six adventurers to navigate the city's streets, sewers, and multi-level dungeons to confront and defeat him. The game was ported to the Commodore 64, Apple IIGS, ZX Spectrum, Amstrad CPC, Amiga, Atari ST, MS-DOS, Mac, and NES. It spawned The Bard's Tale series of games and books. The earliest editions of the game used a series title of Tales of the Unknown, but this title was dropped for later ports of The Bard's Tale and subsequent games in the series.

In August 2018, a remastered version was released for Windows, followed by the Xbox One release in 2019.

== Gameplay ==
A screenshot of The Bard's Tale on the Commodore 64

A screenshot of The Bard's Tale on the Apple IIGS

The Bard's Tale is a straightforward dungeon crawl. The objective is to gain experience and advance characters' skills through (mostly) random combat with enemies and monsters. This is done while exploring maze-like dungeons, solving occasional puzzles and riddles, and finding or buying better weapons, armor, and other equipment.

When beginning the game, the player may create up to six player characters, chosen from among the following classes: bard, hunter, monk, paladin, rogue, warrior, magician, and conjurer. The classes sorcerer and wizard are available to experienced conjurers and magicians. On some platforms, the player can import previously created characters from Wizardry and/or Ultima III, which was somewhat revolutionary at the time of the game's release.

Of particular innovation to the genre was the bard, whose magical songs functioned like long-lasting spells and affected the player's party in various ways—such as strengthening their armor, or increasing their attack speed. A number of obligatory puzzles in the game were unsolvable without the use of bard songs. Each bard song triggered corresponding music while he played (some classical, some original).

Magic users were allowed to change classes permanently. The game manual describes a magic user who has mastered all spells from all four classes as "An Archmage, the most powerful being in the world of The Bard's Tale." However, Archmage status had no effect on gameplay other than having all spells available.

Casting one of the 85 magic user spells consisted of typing a four-letter code found only in the printed game manual. However, when using a mouse (in the DOS, Amiga, and Macintosh versions), the full names of the spells would appear in a list to choose from.

Combat is turn-based, described in text rather than shown graphically; there is no notion of moving characters around on a map during combat. Cash and experience points are distributed evenly to all surviving party members after a particular encounter is won.

== Plot ==
The following text from the box cover summarizes the premise:

Long ago, when magic still prevailed, the evil wizard Mangar the Dark, threatened a small, harmonious country town called Skara Brae. Evil creatures oozed into Skara Brae and joined his shadow domain. Mangar froze the surrounding lands with a spell of Eternal Winter, totally isolating Skara Brae from any possible help. Then, one night, the town militiamen all disappeared without a trace.

The future of Skara Brae hung in the balance. And who was left to resist? Only a handful of unproven young Warriors, junior Magic Users, a couple of Bards barely old enough to drink, and some out of work Rogues.

You are there. You are the leader of this ragtag group of freedom fighters. Luckily you have a Bard with you to sing your glories, if you survive. For this is the stuff of legends. And so the story begins...

In the game, the player forms a group of up to six characters. Game progress is made through advancing the characters so that they are powerful enough to defeat the increasingly dangerous foes and monsters in the dungeons, obtaining certain items relevant to solving the overall quest, and obtaining information.

The fictional town of Skara Brae consists of 30x30 map tiles containing either buildings or streets (plus gates and magical guardian statues blocking certain streets). Access to one tower in the northeastern and southwestern city corner each is blocked by locked gates. The main city gates, which open to the west, are blocked by snow and remain impassable throughout the game. One street seems to lead south endlessly, by actually teleporting the party back to its beginning upon reaching the portion where the city walls would be.

Certain buildings within the city are special, such as the Adventurer's Guild, Garth's Equipment Shoppe, the Review Board (which is unmarked and must be found first, and is the only place where characters can advance in experience levels), various taverns and temples, and the dungeons. The latter are mazes of various kinds—cellars, sewers, catacombs, or fortresses—full of monsters and riddles, some guarded by magical statues that come to life to attack trespassing player parties.

1. The first dungeon is the Wine Cellar (1 level) of a tavern, which turns out to be connected to the Sewers of Skara Brae (3 levels) that in turn feature an exit that leads to the otherwise inaccessible southwestern corner of the city where Mangar's Tower, the final dungeon, is located. The tower cannot be entered without a key, however. In the sewers, numerous hints are found, including the name of the Mad God. Finding the Wine Cellar requires the party to order some wine at a specific tavern. There was a hint to this in the manual (Hint: The first dungeon is the wine cellar of the only tavern in town which serves wine. It's on Rakhir Street). However, this hint was not present in the manual included with the C64 release of the game. Upon ordering wine, the party is sent by the bartender to his cellar to fetch a bottle themselves. It is not actually possible within the game to obtain a bottle of wine, nor is it required to proceed.
2. The undead-infested Catacombs (3 levels) beneath the temple of the Mad God, accessible only if his name is known (the player must type the password to enter). On the lowest level, a Spectre must be defeated to obtain an eye.
3. If they possess the eye, a statue of the Mad God in Baron Harkyn's Castle (3 levels) will teleport the party to the (otherwise inaccessible) northeastern area of Skara Brae where the next dungeon is located; however, it is not required to proceed to the next dungeon immediately. If weakened too much from the fighting in the castle, the party may elect to leave the area via one-way portals instead at this point and return to the city and the Adventurer's Guild.
4. Kylearan's Tower (1 level) can only be reached through the teleporter in Harkyn's Castle, requiring any party who wishes to enter to fight through the castle's three levels first. Kylearan the Archmage awaits the party at the conclusion of his tower maze and turns out to be friendly. He gives the party an access key to Mangar's Tower, the final dungeon, but they still have to circumvent the locked gates around the tower by going through the Sewers.
5. Still reachable only via the Sewers at this point in the game, Mangar's Tower (5 levels) is the final dungeon that has to be overcome to reach Mangar and slay him, provided the party has acquired several items in the other dungeons which are required to best him. At one point within the tower, the party can acquire a key that will allow them to access Mangar's Tower and Kylearan's Tower from the city directly thenceforward, without having to move through the Sewers or Harkyn's Castle, respectively.

== Development ==
Michael Cranford developed the concept, design, and programming of The Bard's Tale and its successor game (The Bard's Tale II: The Destiny Knight), with additional design by Brian Fargo (the founder of Interplay) and Roe Adams III. David Lowery designed the graphics, Lawrence Holland composed the music, and Joe Ybarra served as producer. Cranford stated that most of the game design was based on his and Fargo's Dungeons & Dragons gaming experiences. Cranford and Fargo tried to improve on previous games of the genre in many areas including graphics and sound, with Cranford pointing to the Apple version of Wizardry as an example of a game that fell short in his judgement. The Bard's Tale was originally going to be named Shadow Snare and was announced as a successor to Cranford's earlier game Maze Master which was published by Human Engineered Software in 1983.

Cranford is a devout Christian. He included references to Jesus in The Bard's Tale, and all but one of the city names in The Bard's Tale II are taken from the New Testament. After a falling-out with Brian Fargo, he was not involved in The Bard's Tale III and decided to go back to college to study philosophy and theology instead.

Cranford stated that they used a consultant during game development who suggested various ideas, including the city name Skara Brae, which was also used in Ultima IV—a surprise discovery after that game's release due to the consultant's work on Ultima IV as well. Cranford noted that they did not use the other ideas as the similarities could have been problematic.

Rebecca Heineman, who worked at Interplay at the time (then as Bill "Burger" Heineman), is credited in the game's manual for the "data compressing routines that allowed [Cranford] to pack so much graphics and animation", and according to herself also wrote development tools for the game such as a graphic editor and all ports to other platforms. Heineman became openly critical of Cranford in later years, saying in an interview that Cranford, after doing some last bugfixes, held the game's final version "hostage" to force Brian Fargo to sign a publishing contract that contained a clause by which the sequel game (The Destiny Knight) would be Cranford's alone. Brian Fargo confirmed this, but still defended Cranford.

Cranford in turn called Heineman's words "disparaging slant" and "fiction", noting that Heineman ("a storyteller with an agenda") at the time was (paraphrased) a loner who "sat isolated in a cubicle in the back corner of the room", wasn't involved in the company's business operations, nor deeply involved in The Bard's Tale, and therefore would not know all the details. As far as he (Cranford) could remember the situation, Brian Fargo would not produce a written contract for the game until near the very end of the development, and then only under pressure from Cranford withholding the final product. When he finally did, the contract was not what Cranford thought they had verbally agreed on when he had started working on the project, nor something he felt he could or would have agreed to at the onset. Although a compromise was found, Fargo asked Cranford to leave the company after The Bard's Tale II: The Destiny Knight was finished. The experience contributed to Cranford walking away from game development to pursue a different career. Cranford said he later apologized to Fargo after learning that the attorney who had represented him had misrepresented several other cases to his clients and had apparently misled him into assuming the worst.

Cranford, Fargo, and Heineman have all since stated that they hold no grudges against each other over something that occurred when they were in their early twenties. Cranford and Fargo remain friends. When Fargo, through his firm inXile Entertainment, started making The Bard's Tale IV: Barrows Deep on the original game's 30th anniversary, Cranford was invited to join the project and did contribute, while Heineman offered to create a 'remastered' edition of the original three games for modern operating systems.

== Reception ==
=== Critical reception ===
Reception

Award
Publication	Award
Amstrad Action	Mastergame

Computer Gaming World's Scorpia in 1985 described Bard's Tale as "not to be missed!" In 1993 she criticized the game's starting difficulty and single save location, but stated that it had "many points of interest, particularly in the puzzles, and is definitely a game worth getting". The game was reviewed in 1986 in Dragon #116 by Hartley and Pattie Lesser in "The Role of Computers" column. The reviewers rated the game well, concluding that "Bard's Tale, a game of high adventure ... is one we recommend for your software library." The game was revisited in Dragon #120. In a subsequent column, the reviewers gave the game 5 out of 5 stars.

Calling the Commodore 64 version wondrous, Compute!'s Gazette in 1986 stated that while the game's plot and gameplay did not vary from the norm, "its depth of concept and brilliance of execution" did. Praising the complex magic system, the magazine concluded that "the greatest danger is not Mangar—it's the likelihood that you'll never be able to tear yourself away from this masterpiece of a game". Compute! in 1987 called the Apple IIGS version "unquestionably the most graphically stunning product I have seen on any Apple computer". The ZX Spectrum version of The Bard's Tale, released in 1988, was favorably received. CRASH said that "the Skara Brae environment is so complex and involves so many different factors that it's hard not to get completely enthralled in your quest" and rated it at 86%. Sinclair User rated it at 89%, but noted that it would not appeal to general gameplayers, saying that "The Bard's Tale will enthrall diehard pixie fans [...] but there's too much text, and not enough graphics and animation, to convert the uncommitted." Your Sinclair were similarly positive about the game, rating it 9/10.

Macworld reviewed the Macintosh version of The Bard's Tale, praising the music and gameplay, calling it a "Nice combination of problem solving, combat, and exploration", but criticizing the monochrome graphics and repetitive gameplay, the latter largely directed towards frequent combat.

The Commodore 64 version of The Bard's Tale was given a 'Sizzler' award and rated at 94% by Zzap!64 magazine, in the 1986 Christmas Special edition. Reviewer Sean Masterson called it "the best RPG on the Commodore". In 1993, Commodore Force ranked the game at number 13 on its list of the top 100 Commodore 64 games.

When reviewing its sequel in 1988, Ahoy!'s AmigaUser described The Bard's Tale as "the all-time classic". With a score of 7.49 out of 10, that year The Bard's Tale was among the first members of the Computer Gaming World Hall of Fame, honoring those games rated highly over time by readers. In 1990 the game received the seventh-highest number of votes in a survey of readers' "All-Time Favorites". In 1996, the magazine named The Bard's Tale the 89th best game ever.

=== Commercial performance ===
The Bard's Tale was very successful, becoming the best-selling computer RPG of the 1980s at 407,000 copies. It was the first non-Wizardry computer role-playing game to challenge the Ultima series' sales, especially to Commodore 64 users who could not play Wizardry (a Commodore version did not appear until 1987, with inferior graphics to that of The Bard's Tale). By 1993, The Bard's Tale series had sold over a million copies.

== Legacy ==
=== Sequels ===
The Bard's Tale was both a best-seller and a critical success, and produced two official sequels and a "Construction Set" in its time.

- The Bard's Tale II: The Destiny Knight (1986)
- The Bard's Tale III: Thief of Fate (1988)
- The Bard's Tale Construction Set (1991)

A compilation of all three classic The Bard's Tale games, entitled The Bard's Tale Trilogy, was released for DOS by Electronic Arts in 1990.

According to programmer Rebecca Heineman, the name of the overall series was to be Tales of the Unknown, and the three games were to be entitled The Bard's Tale, The Archmage's Tale, and The Thief's Tale. This is supported by the cover art of the original Bard's Tale release, which proclaimed the game as "Tales of the Unknown, Volume I." However, the immense popularity of the first game prompted Electronic Arts to re-brand the series under the more well-known name. Michael Cranford, however, stated that an Electronic Arts agent they worked with had come up with the city name (Skara Brae, named after a real-life settlement in prehistoric Orkney) and the game's title, The Bard's Tale (from originally: Tale of the Scarlet Bard), and that The Destiny Knight was never going to be called The Archmage's Tale.

What was originally going to be The Bard's Tale IV became an unrelated game called Dragon Wars (1989) at a very late point in its development process, due to rights issues after developer Interplay parted ways with publisher Electronic Arts. The game's name and storyline were changed to disassociate it from the Bard's Tale series.

In 2003, Brian Fargo (who created maps for the first two Bard's Tale games and directed the third) left Interplay Entertainment and began a new game development company named InXile Entertainment. In 2004, they released their first game, also titled The Bard's Tale, an unrelated, console-style, top-down, action RPG which pokes fun at traditional, fantasy, and role-playing game tropes as in those found throughout the original Bard's Tale. It was not a proper sequel to the classic series, nor was it connected in any respect apart from the title and location: the story takes place on the Orkney Mainland, where the ruins of real-world Skara Brae lie. Although a legal loophole allowed InXile to use the Bard's Tale name, and the company had evidently planned to incorporate more elements of the original games, Electronic Arts still owned the original trademarks for the Bard's Tale series itself, and InXile was not legally allowed to use any of the plot, characters, or locations featured in the original trilogy in their 2004 game.

In May 2015, Fargo announced that he was planning to develop and a sequel funded through crowdfunding on Kickstarter, The Bard's Tale IV. The game, which was released in 2018, continues the storyline of the original trilogy but has significantly changed gameplay.

The Mage's Tale was published by InXile in 2017 as a spinoff game using virtual reality technology. It was developed concurrently with The Bard's Tale IV.

=== Remastered Edition ===
During the Kickstarter campaign to create a proper fourth installment to the series, inXile partnered with Rebecca Heineman and her company Olde Sküül to remaster the original trilogy for modern personal computers running mac OS and Windows (instead of the emulated versions offered by inXile). After reaching an impasse in development, Olde Sküül and inXile agreed to transfer the project to Krome Studios. Krome Studios and inXile released the remastered edition on August 14, 2018, as part of the remastered The Bard's Trilogy.

The Remastered Edition essentially re-wrote the original games, keeping only the storyline and gameplay design but little if any of the original game code. Graphics, sound, and user interface were updated to modern standards, various bugs were fixed, and a unified authoritative gameplay was devised when it turned out that there were significant differences not only between parts I, II, and III of the original trilogy (such as the number of characters in the party or spells being available at different levels, or not available at all, in different installments), but also between ports of the same game. Some content was added, including female character portraits and (inconsequential) references to the Bard's Tale IV storyline.

The remastered edition of the original trilogy was released for Xbox One on August 13, 2019. This followed the acquisition of inXile Entertainment by Microsoft. The collection supports Xbox Play Anywhere.

=== Novels ===
A series of novels based on The Bard's Tale were published by Baen Books during the 1990s. Although the books had little in common with the storyline of the games, their existence is a testament to how influential the Bard's Tale brand had become. They include:

1. Castle of Deception, by Mercedes Lackey and Josepha Sherman (1992, ISBN 0-671-72125-9)
2. Fortress of Frost and Fire, by Mercedes Lackey and Ru Emerson (1993, ISBN 0-671-72162-3)
3. Prison of Souls, by Mercedes Lackey and Mark Shepherd (1994, ISBN 0-671-72193-3)
4. The Chaos Gate, by Josepha Sherman (1994, ISBN 0-671-87597-3)
5. Thunder of the Captains, by Holly Lisle and Aaron Allston (1996, ISBN 0-671-87731-3)
6. Wrath of the Princes, by Holly Lisle and Aaron Allston (1997, ISBN 0-671-87771-2)
7. Escape from Roksamur, by Mark Shepherd (1997, ISBN 0-671-87797-6)
8. Curse of the Black Heron, by Holly Lisle (1998, ISBN 0-671-87868-9)

While they are listed here in the order they were published, some books in the series connect more than others, such as Castle of Deception and The Chaos Gate, Prison of Souls and Escape from Roksamur, and Thunder of the Captains and Wrath of the Princes.
