= Fantastic Contraption =

Fantastic Contraption may refer to:

- Fantastic Contraption (2008 video game)
- Fantastic Contraption (2016 video game)
