= Swords and Serpents =

1990 role-playing video game

- Cover art by Boris Vallejo
- Developer: Interplay Productions
- Publisher: Acclaim Entertainment
- Designers: Paul O'Connor; Bruce Schlickbernd
- Artists: Todd Camasta; Scott Bieser
- Composers: George Sanger; David Warhol
- Platform: Nintendo Entertainment System
- Release: NA: August 1990; EU: 28 November 1991
- Genres: Role-playing, dungeon crawl
- Modes: Single-player, multiplayer

Swords and Serpents is a 1990 fantasy role-playing video game developed by Interplay Productions and published by Acclaim Entertainment for the Nintendo Entertainment System. In this game, the player controls a party of four adventurers on a dungeon-crawling quest to destroy a terrible serpent. Along the way, the party encounters an onslaught of fantasy monsters and collects gold and treasure while gaining experience points needed to raise their individual attributes, as well as purchasing equipment from shops within the dungeon. Swords and Serpents focuses mainly on gameplay and contains very little plot development.

The game was originally designed by Paul O'Connor (lead designer for Dragon Wars) but he only worked on the game for two weeks before leaving the project. Bruce Schlickbernd was assigned to revise the game design, but did not feel it was appropriate to be listed as the sole designer. Thus, there is no game designer listed within the documentation for the game. Boris Vallejo crafted the box art.

== Gameplay ==
Split-screen formatting allows the player to view a map and the party's health meters while exploring the dungeon.

Swords and Serpents can be played by one, two, or four players (by use of the NES Satellite or other 4-player adapter). Control of the characters is divided evenly among the number of players, but one player must be chosen as the party leader to control navigation through the game. Upon starting the game, the player creates a party of four adventurers, choosing one of three available classes for each character: warrior, thief or magician. Warriors have high strength and can have greater defense by wearing heavy armor. Thieves have moderate strength and defense but higher speed and agility compared to warriors, they also have the rare ability to land a critical hit that kills a single enemy regardless of how much health they have left. Wizards have the lowest amount of strength and defense but can cast spells that heal the party, damage enemies and enhance dungeon traversal. Character statistics can be randomly generated, or the player can choose a prefabricated party which includes characters of each class plus another magician. Continuing the game requires the player to record and later input five passwords: one password for each character, and a fifth password for overall game progress.

Gameplay is simple. The player navigates through a crude representation of a dungeon, presented in split-screen format which allows the player to simultaneously view the dungeon from a first-person perspective and a simple map of the current level showing the party's location. Encounters with monsters occur randomly (and occasionally in specific locations), during which the map is replaced by gauges representing the creatures' health. During the turn-based fights, the player controls the characters' actions to attack, cast magic spells, or flee. Pressing A causes a character to launch a general physical attack, but by holding a direction on the D-Pad while pressing A, the player(s) can attack a certain part of the enemy's body to possibly cause greater damage. The entire game takes place in an underground dungeon composed of 16 levels, with the serpent at the end.

== Reception ==
Reception

Review score
Publication	Score
Electronic Gaming Monthly	6/10, 6/10, 5/10, 6/10

HonestGamers reviewed the game in 2005 and gave it 8 out of 10, summarizing that Swords and Serpents "is the very definition of 'dungeon crawler' and embodies most everything you may dread about that phrase. If you're one of the few who lives for this sort of thing, though, Swords & Serpents is one of the best the NES ever saw".

== See also ==
- The Bard's Tale
