= Sword (comics) =

Sword, in comics, may refer to:

- The Sword (comics), an Image Comics series created by the Luna Brothers
- S.W.O.R.D., an organization in the Marvel Comics universe that deals with alien threats
- Sword (Chic Carter), a Golden Age superhero appearing in Smash Comics and Police Comics
- Sword of Sorcery, a DC Comics anthology series featuring Fafhrd and the Gray Mouser

== See also ==
- Swords (disambiguation)
- Swordsman (character)
- Silversword (character)
