= Michael Cranford =

American video game designer, professor, ethicist

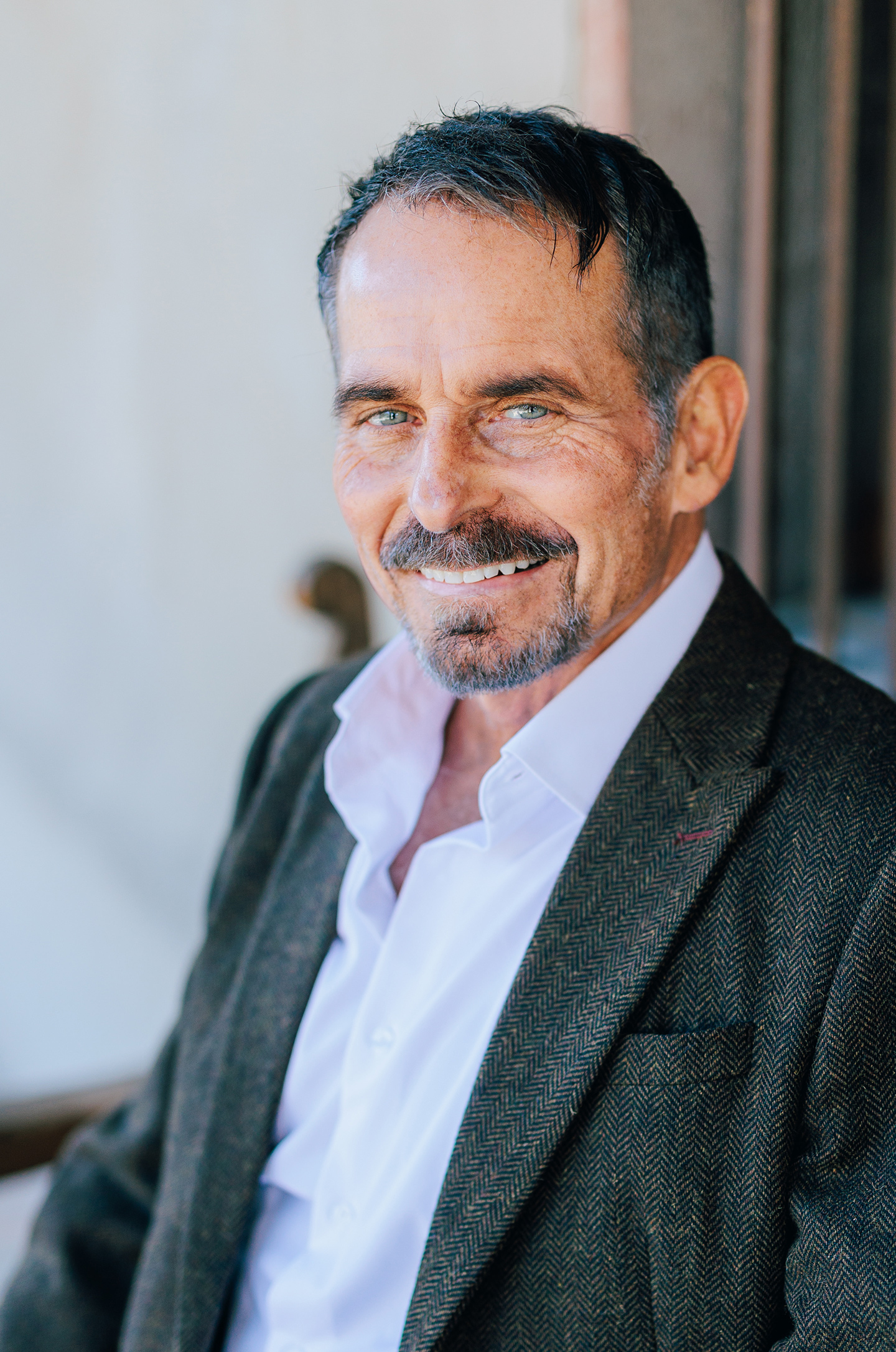
- Born: Orange, California, U.S.
- Education: University of Southern California
- Occupations: Video game designer; Professor; Ethicist
- Employers: Human Engineered Software; Atari, Inc.; Interplay; Broderbund; Cyberdreams
- Known for: The Bard's Tale; The Bard's Tale II; Dark Seed

Michael Cranford is an American video game designer, programmer, and ethicist. He designed and programmed The Bard's Tale (1985) and The Bard's Tale II: The Destiny Knight (1986). His other games include Maze Master (1983) and Centauri Alliance (1990), and he worked as a designer on Dark Seed (1992).

His academic work has focused on philosophical ethics, ethics and technology, and business ethics. He earned a doctorate in social ethics from the University of Southern California in 2007 and has taught philosophy at Concordia University Irvine since 2021. His publications examine the ethical implications of virtual reality and workplace privacy, alongside earlier research in Pauline studies.

== Game designer ==
Cranford was the designer and programmer of 1985's The Bard's Tale and 1986's The Bard's Tale II: The Destiny Knight role-playing video games published by Electronic Arts.. He also programmed the Apple II version of Donkey Kong, the Commodore 64 version of Super Zaxxon, as well as Maze Master (a spiritual predecessor of The Bard's Tale). Cranford left Interplay after The Bard's Tale II and did not work on The Bard's Tale III: Thief of Fate (1988). He later worked as a designer on Dark Seed, published by Cyberdreams in 1992.

In 2018, Ars Technica reported that Cranford had agreed to consult on The Bard's Tale IV: Barrows Deep.

=== Games ===
Name	Year	Credited with	Publisher
Story Machine (VIC-20 port)	1983	programmer	Human Engineered Software
Maze Master	1983	designer, programmer	Human Engineered Software
Super Zaxxon (C64 port)	1984	programmer	Human Engineered Software
Donkey Kong (Apple II port)	1984	programmer	Atarisoft
The Bard's Tale	1985	designer, programmer	Electronic Arts
Borrowed Time	1985	Plot design, with Brian Fargo	Activision
The Bard's Tale II: The Destiny Knight	1986	designer, programmer	Electronic Arts
Centauri Alliance	1990	designer, programmer	Broderbund
Dark Seed	1992	designer	Cyberdreams

== Software development and academic career ==
In 2026 interviews, Cranford described leaving the game industry to complete his education while continuing to work as a software architect for corporations and public sector agencies. A corporation's 2007 annual report lists him as chief technology officer and describes his experience in application and Internet development and development of proprietary client-server technology.

Cranford earned a bachelor's degree in philosophy from the University of California, Irvine in 1989 and a Master of Divinity from Biola University in 1992. He received a master's degree in social ethics from the University of Southern California in 2002 and a Ph.D. in social ethics from the University of Southern California in 2007. In the 2026 RetroMagazine World interview, he described his doctoral work as focused on applied ethics, with a particular interest in ethics and technology.

Since 2021, he has been an adjunct professor of philosophy at Concordia University, Irvine, teaching philosophy, bioethics, and healthcare ethics, including ethics for healthcare administration. His graduate and doctoral curriculum development has included artificial intelligence, technology, leadership, and responsible governance.

His publications address the ethical implications of virtual reality and workplace privacy, alongside earlier work in Pauline studies. In his 1996 article, "The Social Trajectory of Virtual Reality: Substantive Ethics in a World Without Constraints", Cranford examined the relationship between virtual experience and moral responsibility. He argued that experiences in virtual worlds could conflict with the conditions of moral responsibility.

== Publications ==
- Cranford, Michael (1993). "Election and Ethnicity: Paul's View of Israel in Romans 9.1-13". Journal for the Study of the New Testament. 15 (50). England: University of Sheffield: 27–41. doi:10.1177/0142064X9301505003. S2CID 146177953.
- Cranford, Michael (1994). "The Possibility of Perfect Obedience: Paul and an Implied Premise in Galatians 3:10 and 5:3". Novum Testamentum. 36 (3). Netherlands: E.J. Brill Publishers: 242–258. doi:10.1163/156853694X00111.
- Cranford, Michael (1995). "Abraham in Romans 4: The Father of All Who Believe". New Testament Studies. 41 (1): 71–88. doi:10.1017/S0028688500022955.
- Cranford, Michael (1996). "The Social Trajectory of Virtual Reality: Substantive Ethics in a World Without Constraints". Technology in Society. 18 (1): 79–92. doi:10.1016/0160-791X(95)00023-K.
- Cranford, Michael (December 1998). "Drug Testing and the Right to Privacy: Arguing the Ethics of Workplace Drug Testing". Journal of Business Ethics. 17 (16): 1805–1815. doi:10.1023/A:1005742923601. S2CID 142747864. Reprinted in Beauchamp & Bowie, ed. (2001). Ethical Theory and Business (6th & 7th ed.). New Jersey: Prentice Hall. pp. 294–302.
- Cranford, Michael (2007). Laura P. Hartman; Joe DesJardines (eds.). "Drug Testing and the Obligation to Prevent Harm". Business Ethics: Decision-Making for Personal Integrity and Social Responsibility. Boston: McGraw Hill: 301–307.
