= Rebecca Heineman =

American video game programmer (1963–2025)

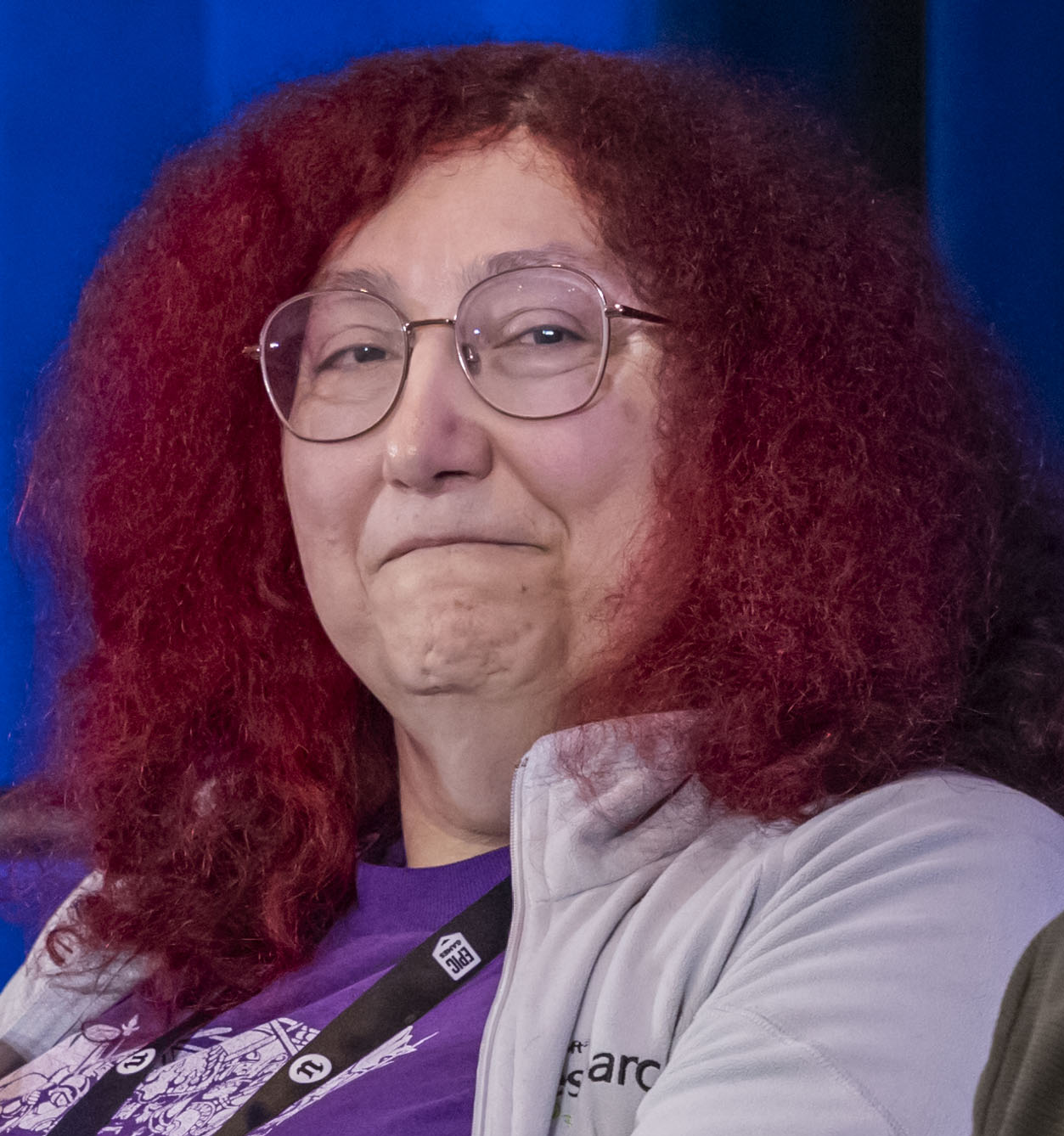
- Heineman in 2024
- Born: William Salvador Heineman; October 30, 1963; Whittier, California, U.S.
- Died: November 17, 2025 (aged 62); Rockwall, Texas, U.S.
- Other name: Burger
- Occupations: Video game designer; Video game programmer
- Employer: Olde Sküül
- Known for: The Bard's Tale III: Thief of Fate; Dragon Wars
- Spouse: Jennell Jaquays (died 2024)
- Children: 3

Rebecca Ann Heineman (October 30, 1963 – November 17, 2025) was an American video game designer and programmer. Heineman was a founder or co-founder of video game companies Interplay Productions, Logicware, Contraband Entertainment, and Olde Sküül. She was the chief executive officer of Olde Sküül from 2013 until her death in 2025.

== Early life ==
Rebecca Ann Heineman was born William Salvador Heineman on October 30, 1963, and raised in Whittier, California. When she was young, she could not afford to purchase games for her Atari 2600, so she taught herself how to copy cartridges and built herself a sizable pirated video game collection. Eventually, she moved from copying games to reverse engineering the console's code to understand how the games were made. In 1980, Heineman and a friend traveled to Los Angeles to compete in a regional qualifying round of a national Atari 2600 Space Invaders championship. Although she did not expect to place among the top 100 contestants, she won the competition. Later that year, she also won the championship in New York. Heineman is hence the first champion of a national U.S. video game tournament.

== Career ==
After she won the tournament, Heineman was offered a writing job for monthly magazine Electronic Games and a consultancy job for a book called How to Master Video Games. During this time, she mentioned to one magazine publisher that she had reverse-engineered Atari 2600 code, and the publisher arranged a meeting between Heineman and the owners of game publisher Avalon Hill. As she met with them, she was hired as a programmer instantaneously. Heineman, aged 16 at the time, moved across the U.S. for her new job, canceling her plans to acquire a high school diploma. At Avalon Hill, Heineman created a manual for the company's programming team, the studio's game engine, and the base code for several software projects, including her own first game, London Blitz, before leaving the company.

Heineman returned to California to work for another developer, Boone Corporation. For Boone, she programmed the games Chuck Norris Superkicks and Robin Hood, acquiring knowledge of programming for Commodore 64, Apple II, VIC-20, and IBM PC, of video game hardware, as well as video game design. Boone ceased operations in 1983, so Heineman joined Brian Fargo, Jay Patel and Troy Worrell to establish Interplay Productions. Heineman acted as a programmer for the company, working on Wasteland, The Bard's Tale, various ports of Out of This World, and the Mac OS, 3DO and Apple IIGS ports of Wolfenstein 3D.

Heineman went on to design The Bard's Tale III: Thief of Fate, Dragon Wars, Tass Times in Tonetown, Borrowed Time, Mindshadow, The Tracer Sanction, and programmed various ports of Battle Chess, among others, for Interplay. As the company grew to more than 500 employees, Heineman, wishing to return to her small-team roots, left the company in 1995 and co-founded Logicware, where she acted as chief technology officer and lead programmer. Aside from original games such as Defiance, Heineman oversaw the company's porting activities, which included Out of This World, Killing Time, Shattered Steel, Jazz Jackrabbit 2 and a canceled Mac OS port of Half-Life.

In 1999, Heineman founded Contraband Entertainment and served as its chief executive officer. The company developed several original games alongside ports to various platforms for other developers. Projects led by Heineman include Activision Anthology, and Mac OS ports for Aliens vs. Predator, Baldur's Gate II and Heroes of Might and Magic IV. During this time, she also provided consultancy work directly for other companies: she acted as "Senior Engineer III" for Electronic Arts, upgraded engine code for Barking Lizards Technologies and Ubisoft, optimized code for Sensory Sweep Studios, acted as senior software architect for Bloomberg L.P. and Amazon, provided training on Xbox 360 development for Microsoft's development studios, and worked on the kernel code for the PlayStation Portable and PlayStation 4 at Sony.

At Microsoft, Heineman also worked on low level code and optimizations for the Kinect. During her tenure at Amazon, Heineman was, in addition to her technological role, also the "Transgender Chair" of Amazon's LGBTQ+ group, known as Glamazon. More recently, Heineman worked on self driving cars at Cruise and worked at Roblox.

Contraband was wound down in 2013, and Heineman founded a new company, Olde Sküül, together with Jennell Jaquays, Maurine Starkey, and Susan Manley. At Olde Sküül, Heineman acted as CEO. Heineman acted as lead programmer for Battle Chess: Game of Kings.

In 2025, Heineman was working in reviving the MacPlay brand that Interplay used for Mac ports, hoping to use over a thousand source codes she kept from all her previous porting jobs to make more games available for Apple computers.

== Personal life and death ==
In a segment in the documentary series High Score, Heineman said she was drawn to video games at a young age, as they "allowed me to be myself" and "allowed me to play as female". As early as at the founding of Interplay, Heineman had a concern with her birthname; at that time, Interplay's founders were not taking a salary, and so to sustain herself, she bought a large number of cheap hamburgers from a nearby hamburger stand and kept them in her desk, which led to the nickname "Burger", a name she preferred to be called by over the next twenty years rather than her birth name. Around 2003, Heineman was diagnosed with gender dysphoria and began to transition to a woman. She formally changed her given name to Rebecca Ann. Following the transition, Heineman lived as a lesbian. As of 2020, Heineman resided in Heath, Texas.

Heineman was married to Jennell Jaquays, a fellow transgender woman. Jaquays died in 2024. Heineman had three children from an earlier marriage that ended in divorce.

In October 2025, Heineman revealed she had been diagnosed with adenocarcinoma, an aggressive form of cancer, and had begun treatment the preceding month. She had started a GoFundMe to raise funds for her medical treatments, but by November 16, told her followers that she had been told her condition was terminal, and requested the funds be used towards her funeral. She died in Rockwall, Texas, on November 17, 2025, at the age of 62. Tributes were given by industry figures who had worked with her, including Interplay co-founder Brian Fargo and game designers Josh Sawyer and Chris Avellone.

== Board service ==
Heineman was part of the advisory board of the Videogame History Museum from 2011, and was part of the board of directors of LGBTQ+ organization GLAAD.

== Accolades ==
Sailor Ranko, a Sailor Moon and Ranma ½–based fanfiction comic by Heineman based on an earlier work written by Duncan Zillman, has won multiple awards. In 2017, she was inducted into the International Video Game Hall of Fame. Heineman won the Gayming Icon Award at the 2025 Gayming Awards. In 2026, she was posthumously awarded the Game Developers Conference Ambassador Award.

== Ludography ==
Game Credits
Year	Game	Note(s)	Ref(s)
1983	Robin Hood	VIC-20 port	
1984	Chuck Norris Superkicks	C64/VIC-20 ports	
1984	Mindshadow		
1984	The Tracer Sanction		
1985	The Bard's Tale		
1985	Borrowed Time		
1986	Racing Destruction Set	Atari 8-bit port	
1986	Tass Times in Tonetown		
1988	Wasteland		
1988	The Bard's Tale III: Thief of Fate		
1988	Neuromancer		
1989	Battle Chess	Ports	
1989	Crystal Quest	Apple IIGS port	
1989	Dragon Wars		
1991	Track Meet		
1991	RPM Racing		
1992	Out of This World	SNES port	
1993	Rescue Rover	Apple IIGS port	
1993	Interplay's 10 Year Anthology: Classic Collection		
1994	Ultima I: The First Age of Darkness	Apple IIGS port	
1995	Wolfenstein 3D	Mac/3DO ports	
1995	Descent		
1995	Kingdom: The Far Reaches		
1996	Doom	3DO port	
1996	Killing Time	PC port	
1997	Defiance		
1997	Shattered Steel	Mac port	
1998	Tempest 2000	Mac port	
1999	Redneck Rampage	Mac port	
1999	Jazz Jackrabbit 2	Mac port	
1999	Half-Life	Mac port, cancelled	
1999	Bugdom		
2001	Myth III: The Wolf Age		
2001	Aliens Versus Predator	Mac port	
2001	Baldur's Gate II: Shadows of Amn	Mac port	
2002	Nanosaur Extreme		
2002	Icewind Dale	Mac port	
2002	Heretic II	Mac port	
2002	Heroes of Might and Magic IV	Mac port	
2002	Hexen II	Mac port	
2002	Activision Anthology		
2003	Medal of Honor: Rising Sun		
2004	Pitfall: The Lost Expedition		
2004	Medal of Honor: Pacific Assault		
2004	GoldenEye: Rogue Agent		
2005	Medal of Honor: European Assault		
2006	The Lord of the Rings: The Battle for Middle-earth II	Xbox 360 port	
2007	Command & Conquer 3: Tiberium Wars		
2007	Alvin and the Chipmunks		
2015	Chip's Challenge	Windows re-release	
2015	Battle Chess: Game of Kings		

== See also ==
- List of programmers
- List of women in the video game industry
- Women and video games
- Women in computing
