= The Mage's Tale =

2017 video game

- Developer: inXile Entertainment
- Publisher: inXile Entertainment
- Producer: Brian Fargo
- Composer: Ged Grimes
- Series: The Bard's Tale
- Engine: Unreal Engine 4
- Platforms: Microsoft Windows, Oculus Rift, PlayStation 4
- Release: Microsoft Windows; June 20, 2017; PlayStation 4; February 5, 2019
- Genre: Role-playing
- Mode: Single-player

The Mage's Tale is a first-person virtual reality dungeon crawler role-playing video game developed and published by inXile Entertainment in partnership with Oculus VR. It is a spin-off of The Bard's Tale, set before the events The Bard's Tale IV: Barrows Deep. It is inXile's first virtual reality title.

== Gameplay ==
The Mage's Tale is a first-person dungeon crawler. Gameplay centers on exploring subterranean passages, solving puzzles, and fighting enemies. Unlike other games in The Bard's Tale series, The Mage's Tale focuses on a single character and class, a mage. Combat is real-time, using physical gestures to throw spells, and a magical shield to block incoming attacks.

The game makes use of a deep spell-crafting system that allows players to mix various ingredients to create different effects. These ingredients affect the element, behavior, and strength of spells.

The Mage's Tale makes use of both free movement and a teleport mechanic for locomotion. Movement is step-based, and confined to four directions, similar in feel to grid-based dungeon crawlers, but without being limited to a grid-based map. This allows players to navigate and dodge in real-time, but the short bursts of movement help to mitigate the sim-sickness suffered by some with smooth movement.

== Development and release ==
The Mage's Tale was developed in parallel with The Bard's Tale IV: Barrows Deep, and the two projects share some assets. Development took place at inXile's New Orleans studio, and was fully funded by Oculus VR. The two titles were developed by separate teams, but share some assets and tools.

The Mage's Tale was released on June 20, 2017, exclusively for Oculus Rift, with plans to bring the title to "platforms other than Oculus Touch" in the future.

== Reception ==
Reception

Aggregate scores
Aggregator	Score
Metacritic	(PC) 72/100 (PS4) 69/100
OpenCritic	29% recommend

Review scores
Publication	Score
Destructoid	6/10
GameRevolution	7/10
GameSpot	4/10

The Mage's Tale received mixed reviews upon its initial release. Aggregate review site Metacritic lists a score of 72, indicating "mixed or average reviews". Fellow review aggregator OpenCritic assessed that the game received fair approval, being recommended by 29% of critics.

At the time of release, The Mage's Tale was notable for its length and depth compared to other VR-exclusive titles. UploadVR awarded The Mage's Tale an 8/10 or "Great" score, citing its "engrossing 10+ hour long adventure" and "addictive spellcrafting system" as well as the many boss fights. PC Gamer's Tom Marks touted the title as "one of the first VR games I've played that feels like the full package," but lamented the lack of strategic depth compared to more traditional dungeon crawlers. VRFocus awarded the title 5/5 stars, again citing it as one of the few RPGs of its size and scope available in VR. GameSpot reviewed it negatively, praising its tone and environments while criticizing its shallow puzzles, repetitive combat, nauseating movement, and dialogue.
