= Defiance (1997 video game) =

1997 video game

- Developer: Logicware
- Publisher: Visceral Productions
- Platform: Microsoft Windows
- Release: NA: 29 October 1997
- Genre: First-person shooter
- Modes: Single-player, multiplayer

Defiance is a 1997 video game developed by Logicware and published by Visceral Productions for Microsoft Windows. The game is a futuristic first-person shooter in which players operate a fighter craft named the LAV-6 SABER and must rescue scientists from a military complex. It was the first action published by Visceral Productions, which had been established as a division of wargaming company Avalon Hill to distribute action titles. Upon release, Defiance received mixed reviews, with reviewers praising the game's level design, but critiquing its similarity to other shooter titles and visual presentation.

== Gameplay ==
Gameplay screenshot

Players control a ship and manoeuvre it using the mouse and keyboard or joystick. Thrusters propel the player vertically to navigate across corridors, tunnels and terrain. The game features 13 levels, and four difficulty modes from Easy to Insane. Players start with a twin laser weapon, and gain access to stronger weapons progressing the game, including a Chaingun, Fusion Cannon, Stream cannon and missiles, and power-ups such as Thrust Expanders and Shield Generators. To save progress, players must locate stations placed throughout levels to save using the menu. Defiance also supports multiplayer play over the Internet or a local area network, featuring a deathmatch game mode.

== Plot ==
On the planet Calchona, war has erupted between two factions: the Hegemonistic Corps of Planets and Anterran Premacy Worlds. Inside a secret military complex, players assume the role of a Corps pilot testing an experimental fighter craft, the LAV-6 SABER, a Low-Altitude Assault Vehicle. During a training mission, the base is attacked and overrun by bio-mechanical creatures designed to kill. Completely overrun, players must single-handedly rescue scientists and regain control of the base.

== Development ==
Defiance was published by Visceral Productions, a Baltimore-based software publishing division of the board game company Avalon Hill. Visceral Productions was formed as the entry of Avalon Hill into publishing action titles, with Defiance as its debut, with the intent of distinguishing the division from the company's previous strategy software. Logicware, the developers of Sonic Extreme and Killing Time, designed the game, led by Lars Brubaker, a senior producer and software engineer at Logicware and former staff member of Interplay Entertainment. Games including Descent, Dark Forces, Duke Nukem 3D and Cyberia were cited by the publisher as influences on the game's design.

Defiance was showcased by Avalon Hill at E3 1997, and a game demo was released through ZDNet and GameSpot in September of that year. Computer Games Strategy Plus described Defiance as a "surprise release", due to the studio's close association with wargames and strategy titles. Pre-release courage was positive, with PC Gamer praised the preview's "unique gameplay twists" and "strong sense of narrative and purpose", and Computer Game Entertainment considered it guided a "brave new outlook" for action games. Defiance was released on 31 October 1997.

== Reception ==
Reception

Review scores
Publication	Score
Computer Games Strategy Plus	3.5/5
Computer Gaming World	2.5/5
GameSpot	5.3
GameStar	61%
PC Games (US)	C
Computer Game Entertainment	85%
Online Gaming Review	5.1/10

Defiance received mixed reviews upon release. Reviewers compared the game to the first-person shooter Descent and similar titles. Several critics considered the game offered little that was new to the genre, and The Duelist wrote that whilst the game was on par with its competitors, the market had been "beaten to death with this type of game". Critics lamented the omission of features, including a automap, greater freedom of movement, and the opportunity to regularly save the game. The controls were also faulted.

The level design of Defiance was praised by some as large and open-ended, with the Online Gaming Review commending its "genuine creativity" and "solid design". The variance in settings across levels was also praised, and Computer Games Strategy Plus stated its "large and maze-like" levels were varied enough to "[keep] the game interesting". The visual presentation of Defiance was critiqued, with several remarking that it looked dated. GameSpot considered it featured realistic looking effects, but its "insipid colour palette" was unexciting, and Computer Game Entertainment enjoyed the game's weapon effects, but disliked the "dark and dingy" colour scheme and found they made it feel "claustrophobic and confining". Critics also cited performance problems, and found little enhancements to the visuals when 3D acceleration such as Direct3D was supported.
