= Dark Seed (video game) =

1992 video game

- MS-DOS cover art from Giger's 1974 painting, Li II
- Developer: Cyberdreams
- Publishers: Cyberdreams; GAGA Communications (Saturn, PlayStation)
- Producers: Ari Minasian; Mike Dawson; Harald Seeley
- Designers: Michael Cranford; Mike Dawson
- Artists: H. R. Giger; Bernd Brummbaer
- Writer: Michel Horvat
- Composers: Gregory Alper; Chris Granger; David Bean
- Platforms: MS-DOS, Amiga, Macintosh, Amiga CD32, Sega Saturn, PlayStation
- Release: 1992: MS-DOS; NA: 1992; EU: 1992 Amiga; NA: 1992; EU: 1993 Macintosh; NA: 1993 Amiga CD32; EU: 1994 Sega Saturn; JP: July 7, 1995 PlayStation; JP: October 27, 1995
- Genre: Point-and-click adventure
- Mode: Single-player

Dark Seed is a psychological horror point-and-click adventure game developed and published by Cyberdreams in 1992. It is set in a normal world and a dark world counterpart, the latter based on artwork by H. R. Giger. It was one of the first point-and-click adventure games to use high-resolution (640 × 350 pixels) graphics, to Giger's demand. A sequel, Dark Seed II, was released in 1995.

== Plot ==
Mike Dawson is a successful advertising executive and writer who has recently bought an old mansion on Ventura Drive (named after Ventura Boulevard) in the small town of Woodland Hills. On his first night at the house, Mike has a nightmare about being imprisoned by a machine that shoots an alien embryo into his brain. He wakes up with a large headache and, after taking a painkiller and a shower, explores the mansion. He finds clues about the previous owner's death, which reveal the existence of a parallel universe called the Dark World ruled by sinister aliens called the Ancients.

On the second day, he travels to that universe through the living room mirror and meets the Keeper of the Scrolls, a friendly darkworlder. She tells him that the nightmare he had on his first night was real and warns him that if the embryo—the eponymous Dark Seed—is born, it will kill him and all of humanity. The only way to stop this, she says, is to destroy the Ancients' Power Source.

On the third and final day, Mike executes an elaborate plan that culminates with the Ancient ship's departure on the Dark World, depriving them of their power source, and the destruction of the living room mirror, sealing the Ancients out of the Normal World. The game ends with the town librarian visiting Mike and telling him she found some pills in her purse prescribed to Mike, although she does not understand how they got there. The medication will presumably kill the embryo inside his head. A morphing animation reveals that, unbeknownst to the librarian, she is the Keeper of the Scrolls' counterpart. Mike then states that he is just beginning to understand. The ending then shows that the old mansion has been put up for sale.

== Gameplay ==
Unlike most point-and-click adventure games, which give the player time to explore, many actions in Dark Seed must occur within precise time limits, or the game will end up in an unwinnable state. As a result of this, one must start over repeatedly to win without resorting to a walkthrough. Amiga Format, in its review, stated with regards to Dark Seed's gameplay: "Too many things in the game need to be done within a specific time, or in a certain order, and you don't necessarily know when you've passed that 'critical point' after which you're fighting a lost cause. As a result, you often have to play the game several times over, going through scenes you've seen countless times before".

The player has three real time hours within which they must complete the game, which is the equivalent of three in-game days. Time can also be passed by using the in-game wait function, and the time can be checked by looking at Dawson's watch, or by inspecting the grandfather clock in the house. At the end of each day, Dawson goes to sleep and upon going to bed, each night he has a nightmare of the Dark World. Dawson automatically goes to sleep at ten P.M. each night, regardless of where the player is. If it becomes night while Dawson is in the Dark World, he will fall asleep and die, resulting in a game over. Dawson is able to access the Dark World on day two upon receiving a piece of a mirror in the mail and re-assembling it with the rest of the mirror, creating a portal to the Dark World. Every room, person and object in the normal world has a Dark World equivalent and this is often necessary for puzzle solving.

When interacting with objects, the options available to the player include look/inquire, touch/manipulate, and move, denoted by a "?", a hand, and four arrows pointing inwards respectively. Looking at an object and manipulating an object are context-sensitive: the "?" becomes a "!" when the cursor is over items or areas of interest and the hand icon points upwards when the cursor is over items that can be picked up or manipulated.

== Production ==
When Cyberdreams approached H. R. Giger about providing artwork for a video game, the artist disliked the proposed use of VGA Mode 13h's 320 by 200 graphics and demanded higher resolution, calling lower resolution "square and jagged". The developers agreed to use 640 by 350 mode instead, although doing so reduced the palette from 256 to 16 colors. Cyberdreams received access to almost all of Giger's artwork. Some of the work selected for use in Dark Seed includes: "N.Y. City III", "Hommage a Bocklin", and "Li II". "Li II" is featured on the cover, box and manual art.

Developers used an Epson flatbed scanner to import selected body parts and landscape fragments in monochrome, then with Deluxe Paint II Enhanced for MS-DOS assembled them into single images. An Amiga and an S-VHS camera digitized actors' poses that Cyberdreams further edited on PCs. After the company decided that the images were inadequate late in the development process, developers hand colored the art for six more months. The main character, Mike Dawson, is named after the game's designer and producer. He also lent his appearance to the character's sprite.

== Ports ==
The original game was released for MS-DOS first, then Amiga, Amiga CD32, Macintosh, Sega Saturn and PlayStation. The Amiga CD32 version includes narration for Mike Dawson's dialogue, voiced by Mike Dawson, which is left unvoiced in other versions.

In Japan, Dark Seed was released for the Sega Saturn on July 7, 1995 and the PlayStation on October 27, 1995.

There was also a version developed for the Sega CD and even promoted for American release, but publisher Vic Tokai never released it. An unlicensed version was released for the Nintendo Entertainment System (NES) in Chinese, but an English translated ROM is currently being worked on by a small nonprofit team.

== Reception ==
Reception

Review score
Publication	Score
Famicom Tsūshin	6/10, 5/10, 5/10, 8/10 (SS); 7/10, 6/10, 6/10, 8/10 (PS)

Computer Gaming World called Dark Seed in 1992 "the most integrated and effective feel for a horror adventure yet" but criticized the unforgiving real-time gameplay that often caused unwinnable situations, hard-to-find on-screen puzzle elements, and an overly abrupt ending, stating that "the interactive elements are so poorly implemented that they nearly destroy the effect" of the graphics and sound. The magazine nonetheless concluded that the game "hint[s] at tremendous potential" and hoped that Cyberdreams' future games would be "not only beautiful, but fun to play". QuestBusters recommended the game to fans of the Alien films and Accolade's Elvira games. The reviewer wrote: "The graphics are impressive, the atmosphere gripping, but for me the staying power was the story and wondering what was going to happen next", and concluded: "I didn't think it was the best thing out this year, but I certainly would have missed out if I'd passed it by. Give it a shot". The game was reviewed in 1992 in Dragon #188 by Hartley, Patricia, and Kirk Lesser in "The Role of Computers" column. The reviewers gave the game 3 out of 5 stars.

Amiga Format gave the Amiga version of Dark Seed an overall score of 72%, praising the use of Giger's artwork and "stunningly spooky" graphics, calling it "the nearest thing you could have to a software nightmare", but criticizes its strict timeframe, and refers to Dark Seed's gameplay as "its weakest element". The One gave the Amiga version of Dark Seed an overall score of 80%, praising its "well-designed" controls, and states that "The premise isn't a particularly original one, but good sci-fi is all about ideas and Darkseed has plenty of them, most of which are used to good effect game-wise - I particularly like the way the real and alien worlds mirror each other". The One also praises the music and graphics, expressing that the game "creates a strong atmosphere, with some superb music ... Giger's artwork adds greatly to the claustophobic tension". They criticize the amount of time it takes to get to different locations, calling it "tedious", as well as the "rigorous" time limit, stating that "in Darkseed it sometimes feels like you're playing to a timetable and if you're not in the right place at the right time, a vital clue or character may be lost forever". Rob Lawrence of Amiga World wrote that the graphics, art, and sound of Dark Seed were good, but only "skin-deep." He thought the game was ultimately too small and linear, and that the ending was "stupid".

Next Generation gave the Sega CD version (which was ultimately never released) three out of five stars, describing it as "a perfect example of graphic-adventure-as-nightmare ... Half of the game's appeal lies in the bizarre and frightening hallucinations suffered by the hero (or maybe they aren't hallucinations...). We recommend checking it out".

In 1993, the game received a Codie award from the Software Publishers Association for Best Fantasy Role-Playing/Adventure.

Dark Seed was a nominee for Computer Games Strategy Plus's 1992 "Best Adventure" award, which ultimately went to The Lost Files of Sherlock Holmes: The Case of the Serrated Scalpel. The magazine's Theo Clarke wrote: "The strength of this game lies in its atmosphere, but my pleasure was diminished by the use of a master diskette at the security device".

== Legacy ==
In 2006, GameTrailers named Dark Seed the seventh scariest game of all time, ranking it above Clock Tower, System Shock 2, and Eternal Darkness: Sanity's Requiem.

An urban legend spread that the intense pressure of designing the game gave lead designer Mike Dawson a mental breakdown. However, he actually left the games industry after completing Dark Seed and moved into television writing (including some episodes of Family Matters) until the late 1990s, wrote four books on programming (including Beginning C++ Game Programming and Python Programming for the Absolute Beginner) and is teaching game design and programming classes at Stanford University and UCLA.
