= Hunted: The Demon's Forge =

2011 video game

- Developer: inXile Entertainment
- Publisher: Bethesda Softworks
- Director: Michael Kaufman
- Producer: Stewart Spilkin
- Designer: Chris Keenan
- Programmers: Keith Miron; Matthew Fawcett
- Artists: Robert Nesler; Craig Drageset
- Composer: Kevin Riepl
- Engine: Unreal Engine 3
- Platforms: Microsoft Windows; PlayStation 3 Xbox 360
- Release: NA: May 31, 2011; AU: June 2, 2011; EU: June 3, 2011
- Genres: Action-adventure, hack and slash, third-person shooter
- Modes: Single-player, multiplayer

Hunted: The Demon's Forge is a 2011 action-adventure game set in a dark fantasy world. It was developed by inXile Entertainment and published by Bethesda Softworks for PlayStation 3, Xbox 360 and Microsoft Windows.

== Gameplay ==
The game features co-operative multiplayer with online, splitscreen, and LAN options. E'lara is able to use a bow and small weapons, while Caddoc wields larger melee weapons, as well as a crossbow. Players have the option to explore some larger optional areas; however, the gameplay is mostly linear with many points of no return. Players are able to use spells and special attacks to help in combat, which can be upgraded. The gameplay, especially the archery combat, has been compared to the gunplay of Gears of War, with Eurogamer calling the game a "third-person looter". Engadget called the game a "Gears of War clone", and Metro described it as "Gears of War meets Diablo".

The game supports cross-regional co-operative play on all platforms, but the random match-making feature is regional on PC and PlayStation 3, and cross-regional on Xbox 360.

== Plot ==
Two mercenaries in battle, female elf E'lara and male human Caddoc, go searching for a mysterious artifact about which Caddoc had a vision, but events grow out of hand and the companions become wrapped up in a chain of events involving demons, the orc-like Wargar, and a sorceress named Seraphine.

== Development ==
Hunted: The Demon's Forge shares a similar title and fantasy setting with Brian Fargo's first widely distributed game, his self-published 1981 graphical text adventure The Demon's Forge.

inXile Entertainment's President Matt Findley said that Hunted: The Demon's Forge's game mechanics are mainly based on his team's own experience playing co-op games and the resulting stream of ideas on how to improve the genre step-by-step. Findley's personal criticism towards similar co-op titles is that the general definition of co-op has sunk "to allowing two players to play together". "We're co-op in that all of our special skills and abilities are designed to make you work together," Findley added later in the interview.

Before the game's release, Findley stated that a sequel and continuing series would happen if the first game saw enough commercial success. Many ideas were not used, and they would improve the co-op mode in sequels. The next installment would not necessarily be a sequel, but possibly a prequel or new story set in the same world with different characters.

== Reception ==
Reception

Aggregate score
Aggregator	Score		
Aggregator	PC	PS3	Xbox 360
Metacritic	61/100	57/100	61/100

Review scores
Publication	Score		
Publication	PC	PS3	Xbox 360
Destructoid	N/A	N/A	6.5/10
Eurogamer	N/A	N/A	7/10
Famitsu	N/A	29/40	29/40
Game Informer	N/A	6/10	6/10
GamePro	N/A	3/5	3/5
GameRevolution	C	C	C
GameSpot	4.5/10	5/10	5/10
GameSpy	N/A	3/5	3/5
GameTrailers	N/A	N/A	5.6/10
IGN	6/10	6/10	6/10
Joystiq	N/A	N/A	3.5/5
Official Xbox Magazine (US)	N/A	N/A	6.5/10
PC Gamer (US)	68%	N/A	N/A
PlayStation: The Official Magazine	N/A	5/10	N/A
The Daily Telegraph	N/A	N/A	6/10
The Escapist	N/A	N/A	3.5/5

Hunted: The Demon's Forge received "mixed" reviews on all platforms according to video game review aggregator Metacritic. In Japan, where the PlayStation 3 and Xbox 360 versions were ported for release on August 25, 2011, Famitsu gave both console versions each a score of two sevens, one eight, and one seven for a total of 29 out of 40.

The Escapist gave the Xbox 360 version three stars out of five and said, "Good for a quick and fun diversion, Hunted is far from the perfect coop game or fantasy dungeon crawl, but the storytelling almost makes up for it. Almost." Digital Spy gave the same version three stars out of five, stating that "the muddy graphics and frequently questionable design choices make the campaign sometimes feel like a chore." The Daily Telegraph gave said version a similar score of six out of ten and said it was "a decent enough game to play through, but certainly one you'll forget in a hurry. It's the kind of game perfect for a lull in gaming when there's nothing else left, and you fancy something disposable but enjoyable." Edge gave the console version six out of ten and said, "Like a horse swishing its tail with futile persistence, Hunted never manages to rid itself of bugs." However, The A.V. Club gave the same version a C and stated that the problem with the game is that "It thinks ham-fisted cooperation is indistinguishable from effortless cooperation. Any two people playing together know better." GameZone gave the game a score of five out of ten and said that it "offers a modicum of playing pleasure on a slow weekend, but a rental would be safer than a purchase." Metro gave the same console version four out of ten and said, "Gears of War meets Diablo turns out not to be a classic pairing after all, or at least not when it comes to this low rent hotchpotch of other people's ideas."
