= The Bard's Tale Construction Set =

- Developer: Interplay
- Publisher: Interplay (Note: Distributed in Europe by Electronic Arts)
- Producer: Thomas R. Decker
- Programmers: Tim Cain; Greg Christensen; John Philip Britt
- Series: The Bard's Tale
- Platforms: MS-DOS, Amiga
- Release: DOS: EU: October 1991; NA: 1991; Amiga: NA/EU: 1992
- Genres: Role-playing, game creation system
- Mode: Single-player

The Bard's Tale Construction Set is a computer game creation system that allows for the creation of dungeon crawl video games based on the Bard's Tale game engine. It was developed by Interplay Productions in 1991 and distributed by Electronic Arts. It was released for the Amiga and MS-DOS.

Unlike other similar engines, it was not required to own The Bard's Tale Construction Set in order to play games which were created with it, while also allowing designers to add in their own custom title screen. This made it possible for anyone to share and distribute their own constructed games using the system, and a number of freeware and shareware titles were developed using the system and released.

== Sample scenario ==
Included with the software was a sample scenario for the purpose of playing and learning from, entitled Star Light Festival.

Set in the small rundown village of Isil Thania, a band of adventurers has traveled from afar to witness the annual Star Light Festival in which an eerie light comes down from a star for one night only making the night into day.

While awaiting the Festival at the Rainbow Bar, a small twisted man leads the characters into the sewers (which feature the same maps found in the original Bard's Tale game), and from there the characters engages upon a quest that takes them from one location in the city to the next, eventually to find the secret truths behind the Star Cult and the town of Isil Thania.

== Created games ==
Various companies created commercial games using the program. The Bard's Quest was a three-part game series created by Alex Ghadaksaz of VisionSoft (PC, 1994) Flying Buffalo Inc. offered a game called The Buftale based on the company's offices and employees.

== Reception ==
Computer Gaming World's Scorpia criticized the small number of graphics and damage spells, but still recommended the program to those interested in designing their own computer role-playing games. The game was reviewed in 1992 in Dragon No. 183 by Hartley, Patricia, and Kirk Lesser in "The Role of Computers" column. The reviewers gave the game 5 out of 5 stars.

== Developers ==
Feargus Urquhart served as a play tester for The Bard's Tale Construction Set, and went on to found the game companies Black Isle Studios and Obsidian Entertainment.
