= The Bard's Tale III: Thief of Fate =

1988 video game

- Developers: Interplay Productions; Krome Studios (remaster)
- Publishers: Electronic Arts inXile Entertainment (remaster)
- Director: Brian Fargo
- Producer: David Albert
- Designers: Rebecca Heineman; Bruce Schlickbernd; Michael A. Stackpole; Brian Fargo
- Programmer: Rebecca Heineman
- Artists: Nancy L. Fong; Todd J. Camasta
- Writer: Michael A. Stackpole
- Composer: Kurt Heiden
- Series: The Bard's Tale
- Platforms: Amiga, Apple II, Commodore 64, MS-DOS, PC-98, Windows, Xbox One
- Release: 1988: Apple II, C64; 1990: MS-DOS; 1991: Amiga; 1992: PC-98; 2019: Windows, Xbox One
- Genre: Role-playing
- Mode: Single-player

The Bard's Tale III: Thief of Fate is a computer fantasy role-playing video game created by Interplay Productions in 1988. It is the second sequel to The Bard's Tale. It was designed by Rebecca Heineman, Bruce Schlickbernd, and Michael A. Stackpole. The game was released for the Amiga, Apple II (64k), Commodore 64, and MS-DOS.

== Plot ==
The player characters receive a letter from a dying man who informs them that, during a celebration of your defeat of the evil wizard Mangar, his true master—the Mad God Tarjan—arrived and unleashed foul creatures that destroyed the town of Skara Brae. The box cover states it thus:

Skara Brae is in ruins. Roscoe's Energy Emporium stands vacant. The Equipment Shoppe went under so quickly Garth was crushed. Your Bard hasn't stopped whimpering since he realized all the taverns were closed.... Someone—or some thing—has sealed the city's fate with an evil so vast, so unspeakable, that a host of Paladins and an army of Archmages are out-matched. Hard times call for subtlety. Smaller is better. Sneakier is better. What the world needs now is a thief. The Thief of Fate.

The game begins in a refugee camp outside the ruined Skara Brae, which replaces the now-destroyed adventurer's guild from the previous games. Besides the city ruins, the wilderness features a temple for healing, a tavern, and a number of special locations from where the party will embark on missions to other worlds over the course of their quest.

Skara Brae was scaled down considerably. The ruins are 16x16 map tiles instead of the city's 30x30 layout from The Bard's Tale I, though its layout remains recognizable. In the ruins of the Review Board, an old man—the sole survivor—directs the party to first kill one Brilhasti ap Tarj, a servant of the mad god Tarjan, in the "Mad God" dungeon below Skara Brae, a startup quest for the characters to attain power, which can be ignored if powerful characters were carried over from previous games. Next, the old man orders the party to retrieve artifacts from several other worlds and also teaches the group the chronomancer spells to be used at certain points in the wilderness to travel to these parallel dimensions and back:

- Arboria (from Twilight Copse): Pleasant elf realm including the city of Ciera Brannia. They have to bring back the hero Valarian or get Valarian's Bow and the Arrows of Life. It turns out Valarian is long since dead and buried in a sacred grove with the items. The king will only allow the party to enter the grove if they first kill the local villain Tslotha Garnath with the Nightspear that can be obtained from Valarian's Tower. In Arboria, the party meets the warrior Hawkslayer for the first time, though he recalls meeting them before (a hint at the fact that the party is travelling not only between dimensions but also across time in their quest).
- Gelidia (from Cold Peak): The party is next tasked to bring Lanatir or, if they cannot convince him to come, Lanatir's Sphere and the Wand of Power back from this dimension of magic. Gelidia turns out to be an icy wasteland with a great ice keep. In a nearby hut, a diary is found with the frozen corpse of a half-elf later identified as Alendar, who is suggested to be dead for a thousand years already. The diary relates how the garrison, lacking a hero like Hawkslayer this time, fared poorly against attackers who killed the god Lanatir. Lanatir was buried in his keep by his remaining followers, who then sealed it with powerful magic. Alendar, the last survivor, finally cast a spell of eternal winter upon the land to vanquish the invaders and then died in the cold himself.
- Lucencia (from Crystal Springs): Shocked at the news of Lanatir's death as much as Valarian's, the old man sends the party to another pleasant world, Lucencia, where the gnome city of Celaria Bree is located. The party has to get the Belt of Alliria and the Crown of Truth. Unsurprisingly, Alliria has been dead for many moons already, and the items have to be retrieved from her tomb. This involves overcoming a dragon, and also Alliria's lover Cyanis, who was driven mad by being forced to watch Tarjan torture Alliria to death.
- Kinestia (from Old Dwarf Mine): In this dwarven realm, the party has to retrieve Ferofist's Helm and the Hammer of Wrath. They arrive in the middle of a great war of the dwarves against robot-themed monsters and meet Hawkslayer again, curiously before they met him in Arboria. Ferofist is found mortally wounded. He asks the party to destroy the fruits of his foolish alliance with the dark one and leaves directions to the heart of the mechanical invasion. There, the party encounters Urmech, an artificial being who himself was created by Ferofist in violation of the God's Pact against further creation (a heinous act that, according to Urmech, helped free the dark one). When confronted, Urmech turns out to be quite reasonable. He points out that he has done no evil except to live, and that he created others of his kind to protect him and so that he will not be all alone. Having found or perhaps created a new kind of magic, Urmech offers to train certain character classes to become Geomancers, a new type of spellcaster. He also surrenders Ferofist's items to the party willingly, if they ask; though there is also the option of fighting him to claim the items.
- Tenebrosia (from Shadow Rock): This world of paradox features a wilderness named "Nowhere" and a town called Black Scar. The party has to bring Sceadu's Cloak and the Helm of Justice back. Having allied with Tarjan, Sceadu will not willingly give away the items and has to be tracked down and slain in combat.
- Tarmitia (from the Vale of Lost Warriors): The "land of unceasing warfare" is a dimension of perpetual war, with the party moving between interwoven battle sites such as Berlin, Rome, Troy, Hiroshima, Wasteland, Stalingrad, and Nottingham until they arrive at Tarmatia, where they have to obtain Werra's Shield and the Strifespear by besting the war god in combat. As mere mortals, they cannot really kill him, but then they are caught up in an attack by another deity immediately afterwards and witness Werra's death. They get the shield, but learn that the Strifespear was given to Hawkslayer.
- Malefia (from Sulphur Springs): Upon returning to the old man, the party finds him mortally wounded. He instructs them to seek out and vanquish Tarjan in his domain, provides the spells required to go there and back (EVIL and LIVE), and reveals the location of the items the party brought back before he dies. From this point onwards, characters cannot level up in Skara Brae, but need to go to a Review Board in one of the Dimensions. With the items retrieved on their previous quests, the party can navigate Malefia, where they find the Strifespear on Hawkslayer's corpse, and finally confront and vanquish Tarjan himself. The canonical strategy (per the cluebook) is for a character of the thief or rogue class to kill Tarjan, by using their special combat ability to sneak up on an opponent from behind, hence the game's subtitle "Thief of Fate".

With Tarjan defeated, it is revealed that the player party took the places of the deities Tarjan killed, becoming a set of new stars in the sky.

== Gameplay ==
Apple II gameplay

This dungeon crawl game has several improvements over its predecessors:

- A graphical auto-mapping system for the 84 dungeon levels in the game (it was the first game to offer this type of map interface)
- An enhanced save game feature
- Two new spellcaster character classes (geomancer and chronomancer)

== Development ==
Michael Cranford, the creator of the Bard's Tale series, was not involved in this sequel, as he had decided to leave Interplay to study philosophy and theology.

The Bard's Tale III programmer Heineman has said that the original name of this game was to be Tales of the Unknown - Volume III: The Thief's Tale. Heineman also once sought to continue creating new Bard's Tale games, but was unsuccessful in obtaining the rights from Electronic Arts.

Michael A. Stackpole created the storyline of The Bard's Tale III and made maps for it. He has since become a successful author, having penned many novels in the Star Wars and BattleTech series.

== Reception ==
Scorpia, in Computer Gaming World, described Bard's Tale III as an improvement over its predecessor, but "still too heavily oriented towards mega-combat." Five years later, Scorpia recalled "the series redeemed itself with the third installment, flawed though it was", adding that "the best parts are the quests themselves ... worth playing".

In Issue 138 of Dragon, Hartley, Patricia, and Kirk Lesser noted "The mission is no easy task for even the most experienced questers." The Lessers were pleased that this game allowed the player to save their progress at any time, calling it "a much-needed improvement." However, although the Lessers were able to defeat all enemies in the game, they wrote "What did defeat us, and in the end caused us to give The Bard's Tale III a less than perfect score, are the continuous battle conditions in the game ... There is no chance to talk your foes out of attacking or bribe them to leave you alone. Additionally, it seems as though every time you turn around in the dungeons, some foul creature is at your heels ... After more than 40 hours of play, The Bard's Tale III wasn't fun anymore! No matter how hard we worked on puzzle solving and treasure hunting (the meatier aspects of the game), along came the monsters to spoil the fun." The Lessers concluded by giving this game a rating of 3 out of 5, saying "If you particularly enjoy combative environments, then The Bard's Tale III is for you. If not, seek a world more reflective of true fantasy role-playing games — one where brawn and brain are required for success."

In Issue 13 of Gateways, Charles and Sydney Barouch noted "This new edition to the Bard's Tale series is faster and cleaner than its predecessors while still evoking the same feelings." However, the Barouches warned "Thief of Fate is more than just hard, it's excessively brutal. The people at Interplay had to create a world that wouldn't bore the die-hard players." They then listed seven things a new player had to do to survive, and another five ways to get through just the first half of the game.

In his 1989 book Quest for Clues II, Shay Addams, thought this game was "A much more enjoyable adventure than The Bard's Tale I or II" Addams pointed out "Missions involve a wider variety of puzzle types due to a new command that permits you to use objects and artifacts as you would in a text adventure such as Zork." Addams liked the improvements such as auto-mapping, new character classes, magic spells and dungeon levels that vary in size and shape. Addams also liked the diverse settings, and found "The interface is smooth, [and] the first-person graphics [are] sharp and colorful."

In a retrospective review, AllGame gave the game a rating 3.5 out of 5 and called it a larger and improved version of Bard's Tale II but said the puzzles are less diverse and noted the storyline was weak.

== Legacy ==
During the Kickstarter campaign to create a proper fourth installment to the series, inXile partnered with Rebecca Heineman and her company Olde Sküül to remaster the original trilogy for modern personal computers running Mac OS and Microsoft Windows (instead of the emulated versions offered by inXile). After reaching an impasse in development, Olde Sküül and inXile agreed to transfer the project to Krome Studios.

The game was released as part of the remastered The Bard's Tale Trilogy on February 26, 2019. The remastered edition of the original trilogy was released for Xbox One on August 13, 2019. This followed the acquisition of inXile Entertainment by Microsoft. The collection supports Xbox Play Anywhere.

== See also ==
- Silversword
