= Dragon Wars =

1989 video game

- Developers: Interplay Productions; Kemco (NES)
- Publisher: Activision
- Designer: Rebecca Heineman
- Platforms: Amiga, Apple II, Apple IIGS, Commodore 64, MS-DOS, Famicom, NEC PC-98, X68000
- Release: NA: 1989; EU: 1989; JP: August 9, 1991
- Genre: Role-playing
- Mode: Single-player

Dragon Wars is a fantasy role-playing video game developed by Rebecca Heineman, published by Interplay Productions in 1989, and distributed by Activision.

== Gameplay ==
The player starts the game with a party of four characters, who can be either the default characters or ones created by the player. Alternatively, the player may import characters from The Bard's Tale trilogy into Dragon Wars. During the game, the seven character slots can be filled with any combination of the starting characters, recruited characters, and summoned creatures.

== Plot ==
The story from the back of the original box states:

The designers of the Bard's Tale series, Wasteland, and Battle Chess pooled their talents to create the ultimate role-playing fantasy. They knew it had to be a first-rate story with sophisticated graphics. The result was Dragon Wars.

Sailing across uncharted seas, you and your party are in search of a legendary paradise called Dilmun — a place where the streets are paved with gold and no one wants for anything.

However, King Drake of Phoebus has declared all magic illegal - magickers have been slain or fled into exile. In retaliation, enemy islands have threatened to unleash their guardian dragons, the most destructive force in the world. While docked at a harbor in Dilmun, you are arrested on suspicion of spellcasting.

Imprisoned and stripped of everything but your wits, you are sentenced to life in a cesspool called Purgatory. Magic is your only salvation - a worldly possession in a world possessed.

== Development ==
During the initial design process for Bard's Tale III: Thief of Fate, one of the designers came up with a list of enhancements and improvements for the game. With the possibility that Interplay would soon be parting ways with Electronic Arts, it was decided to save these for a future game and stick closer to the original engine, though the auto-mapping feature did make it into Bard's Tale III.

These design improvements came in this next game, Dragon Wars. In essence, the game was a fusion of Bard's Tale and design philosophy pioneered in Wasteland.

Until a month before release, the game was developed as Bard's Tale IV, but the rights to the title were still held by Electronic Arts; thus, a new title and setting were needed for the game. It was derived in part from the Sumerian legends of Gilgamesh, with the chief villain of the game being named Namtar. Since to this point the game didn't feature any dragons, the new title meant that Heineman had to add one.

Interplay advertisements displayed the slogan "Bard's Tale Fans Rejoice!" above the game's name, and mentioned Dragon Wars' ability to import Bard's Tale characters. The designers all felt it was a better game than Bard's Tale III, and indeed, better than any of the Bard's Tale series, but without the tie-in to the old title and without Electronic Arts' marketing muscle, the game did not fare as well.

To defend against pirated copies of the game, Dragon Wars included a collection of numbered paragraphs within their manual. Players would receive an in-game message (i.e. "Read paragraph 23"), and have to refer back to the printed material. The game is very difficult to play without references to the paragraphs, and many parts become meaningless. This form of security was widely used at the time.

A sequel, Dragon Wars 2, was in the concept stage of development around the mid-1990s but was cancelled because of the original's tepid sales figures and RPGs being out of style at the time.

== Reception ==
Dragon Wars was reviewed in 1989 in Dragon #152 by Hartley, Patricia, and Kirk Lesser in "The Role of Computers" column. The reviewers gave the game 5 out of 5 stars. Scorpia gave the game a positive review in Computer Gaming World in 1989, noting improvements over the Bard's Tale series, saying that "tighter design, attention to detail, balanced combat, and a carefully constructed plotline all combine to produce a CRPG well worth playing". In 1993 she wrote that the game was "a good choice when you want something a bit more than a standard slicer/dicer".

According to Heineman, the game sold well but two things were against it: the game being a blobber RPG and not being able to use The Bard's Tale name. The game eventually broke even.

The game was later included in the Interplay's 10 Year Anthology Classic Collection released in 1993.
