= Fantastic Contraption (2008 video game) =

2008 flash-based video game

- Developer: Colin Northway
- Publisher: inXile Entertainment
- Platforms: Adobe Flash, iOS
- Release: September 16, 2008; January 26, 2009 (iOS)
- Genre: Puzzle
- Mode: Single-player

Fantastic Contraption is a Flash-based physics game created by Canadian indie developer Colin Northway, released September 16, 2008. Northway sold the rights to the game to inXile Entertainment who released the game for iOS on January 26, 2009. A sequel, Fantastic Contraption 2, was released July 27, 2010. It was released for iOS on November 5, 2010. In February 2015, inXile discontinued their Sparkworkz web-games division, ending all server support for the games. Colin Northway has expressed interest in reviving the games, and potentially releasing an upgraded version.

== Gameplay ==
Players assemble contraptions with the goal of moving the level's goal object past obstacles and into the goal area. Contraptions are built using various types of rods and wheels, may only be built in the workshop area, and must somehow get the goal object into the goal area by any means possible. Doing so wins the level. Players can play for free with a set of premade levels. In the past it was possible to gain the ability to create their own levels and play other user-made levels for $10, but server support for the games ended in February 2015.
