= Killing Time (video game) =

1995 video game

- Developer: Studio 3DO (3DO) (Note: Ported to Windows and Mac OS by Logicware.) (Note: Remastered version developed by Nightdive Studios.)
- Publisher: The 3DO Company (Note: Remastered version co-published by Nightdive Studios and Ziggurat Interactive.)
- Directors: Larry Reed; Al Tofanelli
- Producer: JuliAnn Juras Appler
- Programmers: Larry Reed, Rebecca Heineman
- Artist: Al Tofanelli
- Composer: Robert Vieira
- Engine: ZX (3DO version), Jaguar Doom (PC version), KEX Engine (remaster)
- Platforms: 3DO; Windows; Mac OS; Nintendo Switch; PlayStation 4; PlayStation 5; Xbox One; Xbox Series X/S
- Release: November 1995: 3DO; EU: November 10, 1995; NA: November 1995; Windows; NA: December 9, 1996; Macintosh; NA: December 5, 1997; Resurrected; Nintendo Switch, PlayStation 4, PlayStation 5, Xbox One, Xbox Series X/S; WW: October 17, 2024
- Genre: First-person shooter
- Mode: Single player

Killing Time is a first-person shooter video game developed by Studio 3DO. Originally an exclusive for their 3DO platform in 1995, it was later remade for the Windows and Macintosh platforms in 1996 by Logicware after the 3DO system was discontinued. On July 23, 2015, ZOOM Platform announced the release of an updated version of Killing Time exclusively for their store. The update work was done by Jordan Freeman Group and published by ZOOM Platform and Prism Entertainment.

The player takes on the role of a former Egyptology student, trapped within the estate of a wealthy heiress on Matinicus Isle, Maine. In 1932, during the night of the Summer Solstice, heiress Tess Conway, while attempting to use a mystical Ancient Egyptian Water-Clock which purportedly grants eternal life, vanished, along with many of her society friends. The player's objective is to find, and destroy, the Water-Clock, and discover the secrets of the estate, all while beating back the many horrors that now occupy the island from beyond the grave.

A remastered version of the game titled Killing Time: Resurrected was released on October 17, 2024, featuring assets from both the PC and 3DO versions.

== Gameplay ==
The gameplay follows the standard set by most first-person shooters with the player using an assortment of weapons. These include a crowbar, dual-pistols, a shotgun, a Thompson submachine gun (Tommy-gun), Molotov cocktails, a flamethrower, and a magical Ankh which can be used to wipe out many enemies at a time. The game does not come with any form of multiplay. To beat the game one must collect a number of vases spread throughout Matinicus Isle, each containing a symbolic part of Tess Conway's spirit. These vases also grant one-time per playthrough power ups. Some sections require the player to strafe, crouch, or jump. The game takes place on a rather large, nonlinear island, with no load times in between sections. Enemies defeated and items taken are permanent for the duration of a playthrough, with guarded weapon caches scattered throughout the island.

The plot is revealed through numerous vignettes performed by live actors. Live action full-motion video characters overlap with the real time gameplay, without breaking to cutscenes. The only exceptions are the opening and closing sequences.

== Plot ==
The player character is an unnamed college student (voiced by Bruce Robertson) out to discover the mystery behind a missing Egyptian artifact. The ancient "Water-Clock of Thoth" had been discovered by his Egyptology professor, Dr. Hargrove, but the artifact went missing soon after a visit by the expedition's patron, Tess Conway. Tess is the heiress of her family's estate on Matinicus Isle, where she keeps her friends, and pawns close by so that she might gain the true power of the Water-Clock. As the game progresses, the player finds out that Tess has used a number of people to gain what she desires, but at a price. Something went horribly wrong, transforming everyone on the entire isle (including the wildlife) into either restless ghosts, demons, or the undead. In the opening cinematic on all versions of the game, Boldt Castle located on Heart Island in the Thousand Islands region of the Saint Lawrence River is used as the visual representation of the Conway Estate.

== Characters ==
- Tess Conway (played by Lise Bruneau): Inheritor of her parents' wealth as well as the Conway Estate, Tess will stop at nothing to get what she wants. Obsessed with being young and beautiful forever, Tess acquires the ancient Egyptian Water-Clock in the hopes of using it to stop time itself. Tess keeps her most useful pawns close to her on the isle, nourishing them with food and drink long enough for her to have them help her fulfill truest ambitions. When at last she has the power of the Water-Clock within her grasp, she is murdered and subsequently activates the Water-Clock too soon in order to save her life and curse her killer. This action ends-up trapping all the people on the island, and the timing causes the experiment to go horribly wrong. Tess and her friends become restless spirits while the rest are turned into mindless zombies.
- Duncan DeVries (played by Eric Flom): Tess' associate, and key to the black market. Duncan is an ambitious bootlegger trying to make a name for himself in the world of crime. His goal to marry Tess in order to acquire her property and wealth, Duncan does whatever Tess asks, in order to gain her favor. With a short temper and a broad mean streak, it's no wonder how quickly he turns to murder when he finds out that Tess has no mind for marriage. With her dying breath, Tess curses Duncan, and possesses his body with the vengeful spirit of Set (Seth).
- Byron Flemming (played by Colin Thomson): Tess' Archaeologist friend, Byron falls hopelessly in love with Tess, while helping her to decipher the instructions for the Water-Clock. All his efforts to woo Tess however, are futile of course, and the lonely Byron is reduced to nothing but another hapless pawn in the long run of things. Cleverer than anyone else, however, he knows the true power of the Water-Clock, which he keeps it to himself, carefully observing Tess' attempt for immortality so that he might learn from her mistakes.
- Mike Murphy (played by Tim Flanagan): Duncan's rent-a-cop body guard, Mike follows Duncan around and makes sure everything goes smoothly. Officially the "guard" of the estate, Mike finds himself without much of a job to do most of the time. He appears only once by himself in the game to offer a quick warning to beware of both Duncan and Tess.
- Robert Kenilworth (played by Edward Sarafian): Robert has been the Conways' official butler for years, and even goes as far as to reminisce over Tess and Lydia's adolescence together. Perhaps one of the game's only "truly innocent" characters, Robert laments over Tess' transformation after the death of her parents, and keeps a wary eye on Duncan, whom he openly distrusts. He is Byron's only friend and appears often to offer friendly advice on how to navigate the Conway estate. Robert dislikes what is going on but remains a loyal servant out of honor for the dying memory of the Conway family.
- Lydia Tewkesbury (played by Paula Sonenberg): Tess' childhood friend, Lydia is kept on the isle for reasons unknown, though it would seem as though Tess gains confidence from being two steps ahead of Lydia at all times. Lydia confesses later in the game that she is sick of being in the shadow of Tess and works to bring her whole establishment down from the inside by leaking as much information as she can to Duncan. Both Duncan and Mike grow fond of Lydia during the course of the game primarily because she is physically attractive. All the same, she remains miserably trapped on the isle and spends most of her time drowning her worries in gin.
- Angela Conway (played by Ashley Penrod): Tess' niece, this ghost of a young girl appears often in the game to spout cryptic poems, particularly in junctions in the hedge maze. Seemingly wise beyond her years, she understands what must be done and where to go and hopes that one can decipher her riddles in order to get the job done.

== Development and release ==
The campaign was created using the Doom Editing Utility and then converted to the game's map format.

The game's original release came as a red CD. Players found a glitch in the game that happens in the clown stage. The screen becomes pixelated and obscures the view of the entire area. The publisher allowed purchasers to mail them their red copy for a fixed version of the game, which appears on a black disk. Since so few purchasers sent in copies, the red version remains fairly common, but the black version is rare. The 3DO Game Guru includes a save file patch which fixes the bug.

In 1996 Acclaim Entertainment acquired the rights to release three Studio 3DO games for the PlayStation, Saturn, and PC, including Killing Time. However, while Acclaim did publish the other two games for those platforms, they did not do so with Killing Time, even though a release date was announced and it was advertised in magazines and on the back of some manuals on games published by the company.

On July 23, 2015, ZOOM Platform announced the release of an updated version of Killing Time exclusively for their store. The update work was done by Jordan Freeman Group and published by ZOOM Platform and Prism Entertainment. The game was also re-released onto GOG.com by Tommo on November 10, 2016.

It was announced on June 6, 2024, that a remaster of the game was being developed by Nightdive Studios under the name Killing Time: Resurrected. It was released on October 17, 2024. James "Quasar" Haley, one of the developers of the remastered version, confirmed the PC version was based on the Atari Jaguar version of Doom that had previously been worked on by developer Rebecca Heineman. However, the actual level creation was completed using the Build editor from Duke Nukem 3D and then converted to game's map format.

== Reception ==
Reception

Review scores
Publication	Score
AllGame	3.5/5 (3DO); 3/5 (MAC); 2/5 (PC)
Next Generation	4/5 (3DO)

The original 3DO release received mostly positive reviews. Critics for both Next Generation and GamePro praised the fast game engine and combination of intense first-person shooting with brain-stimulating adventure elements. GamePro also approved of the stylish visuals and music and especially the use of real-life weapons for the player's arsenal, though they criticized the need to use button combinations to change weapons or look up and down. Next Generation complimented the humor and concluded, "In short, Killing Time is the bastard child of Doom and 7th Guest, and it works." GameSpot concluded that the PC version was a "breath of very fresh air", due "largely to a thoughtful design interweaving setting and story with healthy doses of gunplay and gore."

The game was awarded the 3DO Adventure Game of the Year. In 1996, GamesMaster ranked the 3DO version 2nd on their "The GamesMaster 3DO Top 10."

=== Remaster ===
The remaster developed by Nightdive Studios received "mixed or average" reviews according to Metacritic.
