= Silversword =

2012 iOS video game

- Designer: Mario J. Gaida
- Platforms: Apple iPad and iPhone
- Release: 13 January 2012
- Genre: Role-playing
- Mode: Single-player

A screenshot of the Bard from the game Silversword

Silversword is a fantasy role-playing game created by Mario J. Gaida. It was released for the iOS operating system on 13 January 2012 and is available for the Apple iPad and iPhone.

Gaida modeled Silversword after the 1980s The Bard's Tale series of games, but provided a new storyline and plot. It retains the dungeon crawl character of the Bard's Tale series (first person party based play). It also integrates some of the mechanics of the original Dungeons & Dragons game, specifically, armor classes and the use of dice rolls (e.g., d20) to determine random factors within the game and is instantly playable by anyone familiar with Ultima or Wizardry.

Frequently updated, the game now offers an expansion, German and French translations, and an online discussion forum with announcements, tips and cheats, feature requests, etc.

== Story ==
The game takes place in the fantasy world of Tarnak, which is now running wild with dangerous monsters and bands of thieves since an evil presence began infecting the land. Players control a band of adventurers (created at the beginning or by using the party provided with the game) who use the Castle Cranbourgh as their base of operations at the outset. The adventurers' mission is to carve a path to the last free city in the land, Annsharbour, to lift the siege that has been placed on it. On the way, the party must explore various dungeons and towers while accomplishing tasks that stand in their way. After building the party's strength by leveling up, learning new spells, finding magical armor and weapons, etc., the party goes to the besieged city of Annsharbour and eventually find the evil Maruziel ruling the otherworldly Inferno.

An in-app purchase ("Rise of the Dragons") allows the party to continue on to a new series of maps, monsters, and adventures as large and complex (if not more so) as the original game. In all, there are almost 70 maps to explore, map, and conquer, most with tricks, hints, chests, and hidden features like traps or monsters.

== Gameplay ==
A screenshot during gameplay

Parties comprise up to seven possible characters which are created at the start of the game. Seven races are available for players to choose from: barbarians, dwarves, elves, gnomes, hobbits, humans, and high-men, all with different characteristics that affect game play. Including magic users, there are eleven character classes that can be built upon a chosen race, (1) non-magical: bard, hunter, monk, rogue, warrior, and (2) magical: paladin, archmage, conjurer, magician, sorcerer, and wizard. Character attributes include constitution, dexterity, intelligence, luck, and strength.

Many elements of gameplay from the 1980s Bard's Tale games are evident in Silversword. For example, the dungeon crawl character remains. The magic system is also similar, and the magic user classes—archmage, conjurer, magician, sorcerer, and wizard—seen in the Bard's Tale II are seen in Silversword. Nostalgic Bard's Tale players will also see some familiar faces in the game, such as "Roscoe", who ran an energy emporium for recharging spell units in the Bard's Tale I and Bard's Tale II games. During the game, players are faced with a number of riddles, traps, and puzzles—familiar gameplay features to the veteran Bard's Tale adventurer.

Combat is turn based, which allows players to consider options at the beginning of each round, plan strategy, and see the outcome of their tactics against different opponents.

An expansions set provides a new class, Dragoncaller; Alchemy, a new skill any player can learn; and other enhancements, such as the Master Thief skill for the Rogue.

== Reviews ==
Reception

Review scores
Publication	Score
Apple App Store	5 stars
PC Magazine	Excellent (Editor's Choice)
Gamepro.de	8.7 of 10
Arcade Life	80 of 100
Metacritic	6.9

Silversword received generally positive reviews upon release and in January 2018 had a five star rating in the Apple app store. As one reviewer wrote:

You build your party and plan your strategy and actually have to think. Although it's a little old school (it's based on a CRPG / dungeon crawl game called The Bard's Tale from the '80s) it's quite immersive, and you don't need to know anything about the Bard's Tale to play (although you should have a basic understanding of D&D style games). This is a lot of fun and well worth the cost, just don't expect video or MMORPG things. This is a solo effort based on pictures and text, with combat taking place in rounds. The advantage is that you have some time to plot strategy, with different tactics working better in different scenarios. When you're done, you'll love it enough to buy the "Rise of the Dragons" expansion!

The game was rated "Excellent" (Editor's Choice) by PC Magazine, which wrote:

It's hours of fun for anyone who was a fan of Ultima, Bard's Tale, or Wizardry. In my mind, though, it's the excellent support and updates from Silversword's passionate creator that make this an Editors' Choice and an example of what a mobile app should be.

The game received an 8.7 out of 10 by Gamepro.de. FreeAppsArcade.com called the game a "classically inspired RPG" that is "nothing short of a narrative masterpiece". It was rated 80/100 by Arcade Life and 6.9 by Metacritic.
