= The Bard's Tale (2004 video game) =

- North American cover art
- Developer: InXile Entertainment
- Publishers: NA: InXile Entertainment; EU: Ubisoft
- Director: Matthew Findley
- Producer: Brian Fargo
- Designers: Eric Flannum; Brian Fargo; Matthew Findley
- Programmers: John Alvarado; Kyle Riccio; Michael Winfield
- Artists: Michael Kaufman; Brandon Humphreys; Chris Robinson
- Writers: Matthew Findley; Eric Flannum; Dennis M. Miller; John Parry
- Composers: Tommy Tallarico; Clint Bajakian; Jared Emerson-Johnson; Peter McConnell; Michael Land
- Series: The Bard's Tale
- Engine: Dark Alliance Engine
- Platforms: PlayStation 2, Xbox, Windows, iOS, OS X, Linux, PlayBook, Android, Ouya, PlayStation 4, PlayStation Vita, Xbox One, Nintendo Switch
- Release: October 26, 2004: PS2, Xbox; NA: October 26, 2004; EU: March 24, 2005 Windows; EU: June 17, 2005; NA: June 27, 2005 Steam; WW: December 11, 2009 (PC); WW: November 26, 2012 (OS X) iOS, Android; WW: December 1, 2011 OS X; WW: May 25, 2012 BlackBerry PlayBook; WW: September 13, 2012 Ouya; WW: June 4, 2013 Linux; WW: October 8, 2013 PS4, PS Vita; NA: August 17, 2017; EU: August 21, 2017 XONE, Switch; WW: June 18, 2020
- Genre: Action role-playing
- Mode: Single-player

The Bard's Tale is an action role-playing game developed and published by inXile Entertainment in 2004. The game was marketed as a humorous spoof of fantasy role-playing video games. It is neither a remake nor a sequel to Interplay Productions' Tales of the Unknown, Volume I: The Bard's Tale (1985).

The Bard's Tale was released for the PlayStation 2 and Xbox in October 2004, and for Microsoft Windows in June 2005. The game was re-released on Steam in December 2009. A universal iOS version was released in December 2011 for iPhone and iPad along with the Android version. The BlackBerry PlayBook version was released in September 2012. In June 2013, the game was also ported to Ouya with full controller support.

The game was remastered in 2020 and released under the title The Bard's Tale ARPG: Remastered and Resnarkled.

== Gameplay ==
Unlike the turn-based, first-person view of the classic Bard's Tale games, this game is in a 3D environment with the player watching the only controllable character from an overhead vantage point. It is better described as an action-adventure game than a traditional role-playing video game (i.e. there are no character classes or inventory management).

The player's character, The Bard, has magic and weaponry at his disposal to complete the task. The more the player accomplishes, the better his skills will become. The appearance and gameplay is much the same as the Baldur's Gate: Dark Alliance series, which shares the same graphics engine.

In game dialogue uses a "snarky or nice" system that allows the player to change the outcome of many situations by deciding how they want to respond. The player doesn't know exactly what The Bard will say, but must choose between two labelled buttons. Some choices, such as being snarky to the dog at the beginning of the game, have game-lasting consequences. The first decision is whether to be nice or snarky to the barmaid in The Drunken Rat. Being nice to her gives her the impression that The Bard is a gentleman and she leaves him alone, while being snarky ensures The Bard will spend the night with her.

== Plot ==
An advertisement for the game prior to release showing The Bard following the path "Coin & Cleavage" as opposed to "Save the World"

The plot involves "a sardonic and opportunistic musician and adventurer, driven by carnal rather than noble pursuits. The Bard, who is never identified by a specific name nor addressed by anything other than 'The Bard,' is not interested in saving the world; his humble motivations are strictly 'coin and cleavage.'" His quest is narrated by a mocking, biased man (played by Tony Jay) who cannot stand him. Many of the names and characters are influenced by Celtic mythology and the stories of the Orkney Islands. (Most of the names for places are actual locations in the Orkney Islands, including Kirkwall, Dounby, Finstown, Houton, and Stromness. Some optional areas are places in Ireland, including Dún Ailinne, Ardagh, Carrowmore, Emain Macha, and Tara.)

The Bard (voiced by Cary Elwes) ends up being recruited by a cult to help free a princess named Caleigh. As a result of this, The Bard finds himself being attacked by an assortment of fanatics from a Druid-like cult, sent to dispatch him by a being called Fionnaoch (voiced by Charles Dennis). On the way to complete his quest, The Bard must overcome the challenges of three monstrous guardians, break-dancing corpses, spontaneously melodious goblins, a giant, and a fire-breathing rat.

Eventually, it is revealed that The Bard is just another in a long line of "Chosen Ones", many of whom he finds dead along his path. Caleigh is revealed to actually be a demon tempting people to come free her for years on the assumption that eventually someone would succeed. If The Bard frees Caleigh, she gives him all his heart's desires while destroying the world. If he slays Caleigh, The Bard returns to the road in search of the next bar maid. Alternatively, he can refuse to fight either Fionnaoch or Caleigh, allowing the undead to overrun the world, a situation he is content with as they make good bar buddies.

== Development ==
Although touted in early promotional materials as a remake of the classic Bard's Tale series, InXile Entertainment never had any rights to the series' trademarks of the original Bard's Tale — those rights are still owned by Electronic Arts. This meant that InXile was not legally allowed to use any of the plot, characters or locations featured in the original trilogy. However, allusions to the original Bard's Tale do exist in the game. The city in which Fionnaoch's tower stands, Dounby, is only a few kilometres away from the ruins of real-world Skara Brae, where the original trilogy takes place. The PC, Android, and iOS ports of The Bard's Tale come packaged with the original Bard's Tale trilogy.

In October 2003, Vivendi Universal Games acquired North American distribution rights to the title while Acclaim Entertainment acquired publication and distribution rights for Europe the following month. However, after Acclaim's bankruptcy in September 2004 this led to InXile to find a new European publisher for the game. On January 10, 2005, Ubisoft announced they had acquired publishing and distribution rights to the title.

== Reception ==
Reception

Aggregate score
Aggregator	Score			
Aggregator	iOS	PC	PS2	Xbox
Metacritic	79/100	70/100	76/100	75/100

Review scores
Publication	Score			
Publication	iOS	PC	PS2	Xbox
Edge	N/A	N/A	7/10	7/10
Electronic Gaming Monthly	N/A	N/A	7.17/10	7.17/10
Eurogamer	N/A	N/A	N/A	6/10
Game Informer	N/A	N/A	8.25/10	8.25/10
GamePro	N/A	N/A	4/5	N/A
GameRevolution	N/A	N/A	C−	C−
GameSpot	N/A	6.7/10	6.7/10	6.7/10
GameSpy	N/A	N/A	4/5	4/5
GameZone	N/A	N/A	8.6/10	8.3/10
IGN	N/A	N/A	8.2/10	8.2/10
Official U.S. PlayStation Magazine	N/A	N/A	4.5/5	N/A
Official Xbox Magazine (US)	N/A	N/A	N/A	7.7/10
PC Gamer (US)	N/A	81%	N/A	N/A
The A.V. Club	B+	N/A	N/A	N/A
Detroit Free Press	N/A	N/A	N/A	3/4
TouchArcade	4/5	N/A	N/A	N/A

The PlayStation 2, Xbox, and iOS versions received "favorable" reviews, while the PC version received "average" reviews, according to video game review aggregator website Metacritic. The A.V. Club gave the iOS version a score of B+, praising the narration of Tony Jay, "whose incredulity and exasperation with pretty much everything in the game is a warm delight." Detroit Free Press awarded the Xbox version three stars out of four and opined it was "one of the few games that is downright funny, and there were honest laugh-out-loud moments sprinkled throughout it that kept me playing." The Sydney Morning Herald gave the PlayStation 2 version a score of three-and-a-half stars out of five: "The story and dialogue never cease to entertain. Objectives include rescuing prisoners, killing fearsome scarecrows and playing Cupid. But, although the developers want to ridicule, the action remains conventional."

During the 8th Annual Interactive Achievement Awards, the Academy of Interactive Arts & Sciences nominated The Bard's Tale for "Console Role-Playing Game of the Year" and "Outstanding Character Performance - Male" for Cary Elwes' vocal portrayal of the Bard.
