= The Bard's Tale IV: Barrows Deep =

2018 video game

- Developer: inXile Entertainment
- Publisher: inXile Entertainment
- Designer: David Rogers
- Composers: Ged Grimes; Julie Fowlis; Mark Morgan
- Series: The Bard's Tale
- Engine: Unreal Engine 4
- Platforms: Microsoft Windows macOS; Linux; PlayStation 4 Xbox One
- Release: Windows: WW: September 18, 2018; Director's Cut; PlayStation 4, Xbox One, Windows, MacOS, Linux: WW: August 27, 2019
- Genre: Dungeon crawler
- Mode: Single-player

The Bard's Tale IV: Barrows Deep is a 2018 dungeon crawler video game developed by inXile Entertainment as a continuation to The Bard's Tale trilogy from the 1980s.

== Plot ==
Some two centuries after the now-legendary events from the original trilogy, one Bishop Henred of the Church of the Swordfather (a church militant and now the predominant religion in the land of Caith in which the games are set) has moved the faith to a more extreme and radically xenophobic outlook. Magic-users and non-humans such as dwarves, elves, and the goblinoid trow are now persecuted even though some still live among humans.

The game begins with the execution on the gallows of six people for being magic users, adventureres, or non-humans in the town of Skara Brae as witnessed by the initial player character, Melody the bard. She meets another bard, Rabbie, who escorts her to the Adventurer's Guild which, however, is stormed by paladins shortly afterwards. The player has the option to build another character at this point and continue with that character instead of Melody.

As the Adventurer's Guild is overrun, Rabbie leads the player through an escape tunnel to Skara Brae Below, the ruins of the old Skara Brae (destroyed just before the events of Bard's Tale III) that exist in a giant cave below the new town of the same name. There, the persecuted non-humans and adventurers have set up refugee camps around the old Adventurer's Guild building while paladins scour the subterranean ruins.

The initial mission is to check up on friends and allies up in Skara Brae and elsewhere. Over the course of these missions it is found that an unknown agency is committing crimes and blaming them on the non-humans in an apparent attempt to discredit them and sow civil unrest. As it turns out, the religions of other people and realms have similarly developed, and then been subverted by, malevolent militant sub-cults (much like the Church of the Swordfather, which is portrayed as an originally benevolent religion that underwent a dramatic shift towards malevolence only recently).

Over the course of these quests, the party size gradually grows to six members. (It grows from two character slots to six; some characters have to join the party at least temporarily to achieve certain short-term goals, typically adding a character slot in the process, and can be exchanged for other characters after the specific quest revolving around their character is resolved. It is thus possible to create a party entirely made up of custom characters.)

It is gradually uncovered that a primordial evil, Yadis, seeks to end the dominance of men in the world. To this end Yadis, in alliance with the resurrected Mangar, Lagoth Zanta, and Tarjan, wants to open a rift that happens to lie under Skara Brae, incidentally explaining why the town always seemed to draw the attention of evil wizards.

Ultimately, Skara Brae is put to the torch and the population enslaved to dig through to the rift. Bishop Henred is revealed to be under Yadis's influence, and is eventually slain on the doorstep of the cathedral as the player party races to the dig site in the sewers below the cathedral to stop Yadis.

== Gameplay ==
The Bard's Tale IV: Barrows Deep is a party-based dungeon crawler role-playing video game with gameplay experienced from a first-person perspective.

== Development and release ==
The Bard's Tale is a fantasy role-playing video game series established by Interplay Productions in the year 1985. Two sequels were released in the 1980s before the series went dormant. In 2004, inXile Entertainment developed and released a spin-off game to the series.

In January 2015, Brian Fargo, CEO of inXile Entertainment, announced plans to develop The Bard's Tale IV. Fargo's vision was to a create a true successor to the original trilogy of Bard's Tale games. In May 2015, the studio announced that they would launch a Kickstarter campaign to crowdfund development costs for The Bard's Tale IV. InXile had previously used Kickstarter to successfully crowdfund previous projects—Wasteland 2 and Torment: Tides of Numenera. The crowdfunding campaign for The Bard's Tale IV launched on 2 June 2015 with a target of US$1.25 million. The crowdfunding surpassed its target on 15 June 2015. It was fully funded after only 12 days.

The game is built using Unreal Engine 4. The development team will make use of photogrammetry to create textures for 3D objects.

Scottish folk singer Julie Fowlis contributed to the game's music.

The game was released on September 18, 2018, for Windows. A Director's Cut version for the game, which includes new dungeons and quality of life features, was released on August 27, 2019, for PlayStation 4, Xbox One, macOS, and Linux. Existing owners of the Windows version can upgrade their game to the Director's Cut version for free.

=== Awards ===
The game was nominated for "Best Original Song" with "Across the Seven Realms" and "Best Sound Design for an Indie Game" at the 2019 G.A.N.G. Awards, and for "Best Audio Design" at The Independent Game Developers' Association Awards.

== Reception ==
Reception

Aggregate scores
Aggregator	Score
Metacritic	71/100
OpenCritic	31% recommend

Review scores
Publication	Score
Destructoid	4.5/10
Eurogamer	Recommended
Game Informer	7.75/10
GameSpot	4/10
IGN	7.9/10
PC Gamer (US)	84/100
Shacknews	6/10
VentureBeat	82/100

The PC version of The Bard's Tale IV: Barrows Deep received "mixed or average" reviews from critics, according to the review aggregation website Metacritic. Fellow review aggregator OpenCritic assessed that the game received weak approval, being recommended by 31% of critics.

IGN noted that the game was bogged with technical issues, but called it "an RPG that's brimming with enjoyable, challenging fights, elaborate and entertaining puzzles, and plenty of visual and musical flair". Game Informer wrote that the game's combat was "a joy and handled with finesse" but criticized the combat system for not "hav[ing] the flexibility to take more than the necessities" and wrote that "...long puzzle mazes detract from the inspired combat system..." PC Gamer wrote, "...a number of the underlying systems are unforgivingly old-fashioned...Other elements don't feel 'old' so much as just rough or unfinished", and praised the combat, exploration and world. Eurogamer likened the game to a B movie in that "by not trying to please everybody it revels in being different", while similarly criticizing its technical issues and lack of polish and praising its score and puzzle design.. Destructoid reviewed the game negatively, writing, "The Bard's Tale IV is an absolute mess. The framerate is all over the place, and bugs are constantly rearing their ugly head to impede or altogether halt progress...While the combat and puzzles are interesting enough in their own right, starting in the dreary grey and brown town of Skara Brae is so…unimpressive. NPC models look like garbage and no NPC is ever moving around...even conversations feel stilted...", but praised the environments, tactical gameplay, and puzzles. GameSpot praised the game's soundtrack and heavily criticized its repetitive mechanics, linear map, dated visuals, shallow puzzles, and technical issues. Shacknews thought that the game had good character customization and an immersive world but took issue with the convoluted combat and lackluster story.
