= Silversword (character) =

Comic book supervillain

- Silversword as depicted in Superboy (vol. 3) #5 (June 1994). Art by Tom Grummett (penciller), Doug Hazlewood (inker), Tom McCraw (colorist), and Richard Starkings (letterer).

Publication information
- Publisher: DC Comics
- First appearance: As Arnold Kaua: Superboy (vol. 3) #2 (March 1994); As Silversword: Superboy (vol. 3) #5 (June 1994)
- Created by: Karl Kesel (script); Tom Grummett (art)

In-story information
- Alter ego: Dr. Arnold Kaua
- Abilities: "Animetal" skin, which provides: Superhuman strength Armored skin Flight; Morphing weaponry

Silversword (Arnold Kaua) is a supervillain in the DC Comics universe. He first appeared in Superboy (vol. 3) #5 (June 1994).

== Fictional character biography ==
Arnold Kaua is the curator of the Hawaiian Historical Museum and a proponent of Hawaiian rights. One day he discovers a container with a mysterious alien metal he dubs "animetal". The container explodes and some of the animetal embeds itself in Kaua's chest in the shape of a sword. After discovering the animetal gives him superpowers, Kaua takes the name Silversword (from the plant of the same name) and declares himself the defender of Hawaiian tradition and culture.

After the US Navy uses Kahoʻolawe, a remote and uninhabited part of Hawaii, for target practice, Silversword begins attacking Navy ships. Superboy is able to stop Silversword despite suffering from a virus at the time.

Silversword returns in Superboy #24, where he attacks Superboy and his new partner, Knockout, due to disapproving of Knockout's methods of crimefighting. The Navy has also asked Superboy to capture Silversword, as they are interested in the animetal shrapnel in his chest. Silversword is defeated, but Knockout throws him through a Navy helicopter, to prevent him from being treated as a lab animal as she was on Apokolips.

In Superboy #45, Superboy and the Legion of Super-Heroes face Silversword after he steals the spear of Lono, which is alleged to grant its user great powers. Silversword escapes after causing the museum to collapse.

Silversword takes the spear to Kīlauea to find a magical gem. With the two mystical objects, Silversword plans to resurrect the goddess Pele. Superboy defeats Silversword by immersing him in lava and throwing him into the sea, which damages his body.

Silversword manages to repair the damage to his body, and to contact Pele. She orders him to kill Superboy. Silversword attacks Superboy and Green Lantern, and before they can react, seemingly pushes them to their deaths into a volcano.

The two heroes survive and fly to Hilo to face Silversword and Pele. Pele attacks the two heroes, and nearly succeeds in destroying them. Pele's attack devastates much of the countryside and brings harm to many Hawaiians, making Silversword realize how evil the goddess is. Silversword joins Superboy and Green Lantern and attacks Pele, but is badly damaged by her lava attacks.

== Powers and abilities ==
The animetal shrapnel in Silversword's chest gives him a number of powers. He can cause the metal to cover his entire body, creating a nearly invulnerable armor plating. Silversword can extrude the metal into shapes, usually blades or knives. The animetal gives Silversword the power of flight and superhuman strength. When in his superpowered state, Silversword shapes the armor into the form of King Kamehameha I, the legendary Hawaiian warrior.
