= InXile Entertainment =

American video game developer

inXile Entertainment, Inc.
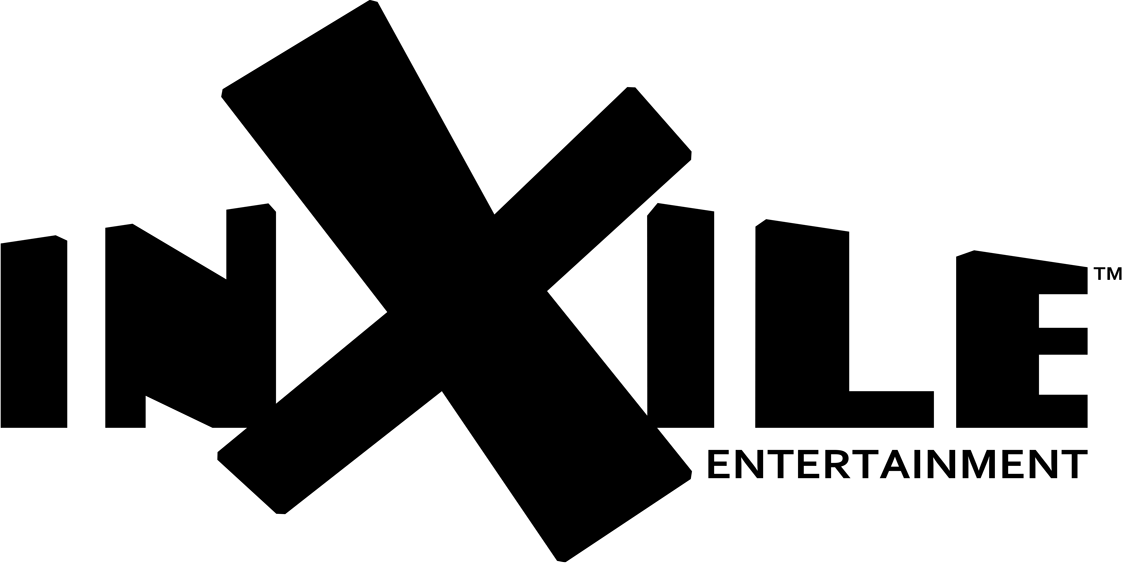
- Type: Subsidiary
- Industry: Video games
- Founded: October 26, 2002; 24 years ago in Newport Beach, California, US
- Founder: Brian Fargo
- Headquarters: Tustin, California, US
- Number of locations: 2 (2024)
- Key people: Brian Fargo (studio head)
- Products: Wasteland series
- Number of employees: 70 (2018)
- Parent: Xbox Game Studios (2018–present)
- Website: inxile-entertainment.com

inXile Entertainment, Inc. is an American video game developer and a studio of Xbox Game Studios, based in Tustin, California. Specializing in role-playing video games, inXile was founded in 2002 by Interplay co-founder Brian Fargo.

The studio produced the fantasy games The Bard's Tale and Hunted: The Demon's Forge, along with various games for Flash and iOS such as Fantastic Contraption in its first decade of development. In 2014, inXile released the post-apocalyptic game Wasteland 2, following a successful Kickstarter campaign. Following the game's critical success, the studio went on to raise a then-record US$4 million on Kickstarter to develop Torment: Tides of Numenera, a spiritual successor to Interplay's Planescape: Torment.

InXile was purchased by Microsoft and became part of Xbox Game Studios in 2018, just as it was developing Wasteland 3, which it released in 2020. The studio is currently developing Clockwork Revolution for Windows and Xbox Series X/S.

== History ==
inXile Entertainment was founded on October 26, 2002, by Brian Fargo in Newport Beach, California.

In an interview with Joystiq, inXile's President Matthew Findley shared some of the company's history: "I worked with Brian Fargo at Interplay for a number of years and we both left Interplay at the same time. We knew we wanted to stay in video games, so starting a company seemed like a good idea -- he spent 20 years at Interplay and I was there for 13. When we were first out there, trying to figure out what to do next, we kinda felt like we were in exile, and we made fake cards with a fake company name just to have a card to go to E3 with. And before we ever thought of the name "inXile", Brian put as his job description on the cards: "Leader in exile." People got such a kick out of that card, we kept saying "in exile, in exile, in exile" so much that we just thought, "Why not make up a new word?" And so we did."

In May 2008, inXile announced the creation of SparkWorkz, an online business division with a focus on user-generated content, using its experience with Line Rider as base for the venture. David Heeley, a former executive for Microsoft, was hired to oversee the creation of the division.

In April 2012, inXile launched a Kickstarter campaign to fund Wasteland 2, the sequel to Interplay's Wasteland, with most of the original team on board. The crowdfunding drive raised more than 300% of its initial goal of $900,000, ending at $2,933,252. In March 2013, inXile returned to Kickstarter to crowdfund Torment: Tides of Numenera. The Kickstarter for Torment: Tides of Numenera broke the record of fastest Kickstart drive to $1 million, raising that amount in seven hours and two minutes.

During a Kickstarter campaign for the game Wasteland 2, Brian Fargo developed the Kicking it Forward program. Under this program, inXile Entertainment pledged to use 5% of post-launch net profits to back future Kickstarter projects.

In October 2015, inXile opened inXile New Orleans as a second studio based in New Orleans. The Newport Beach office was moved to Tustin by January 2021.

In November 2018, Microsoft Studios announced it was in the final stages of acquiring InXile, as well as Obsidian Entertainment, another studio known for its role-playing games. According to Fargo, it was approached in April 2018 by Noah Musler, one of Microsoft's business development executives that had former ties to the studio, who suggested the possibility of acquisition. Fargo believed the acquisition was beneficial for the studio, as at the time, it was in the "uncanny valley" between more independent game development and high-budget AAA games where there was a significant difference in expectations on quality and pricing of the game. Microsoft's support would help it make games that are closer to AAA games and better compete in the current state of the industry.

In June 2023, inXile unveiled their new game Clockwork Revolution during the Xbox Games Showcase 2023.

== Games developed ==
Year	Title	Platform(s)
2004	The Bard's Tale	Android, BlackBerry PlayBook, Classic Mac OS, iOS, Linux, Microsoft Windows, Ouya, PlayStation 2, PlayStation 4, PlayStation Vita, Xbox, Xbox One, Nintendo Switch
2008	Fantastic Contraption	Adobe Flash, iOS, Wii
2008	Line Rider 2: Unbound	iOS, Microsoft Windows, Nintendo DS, Wii
2009	Super Stacker	Adobe Flash, iOS
2009	Super Stacker 2	Adobe Flash, iOS
2009	Shape Shape	Adobe Flash, iOS
2010	Super Stacker Party	PlayStation Network
2011	Hunted: The Demon's Forge	Microsoft Windows, PlayStation 3, Xbox 360
2012	Choplifter HD	Microsoft Windows, Ouya, PlayStation Network, Xbox Live Arcade
2014	Wasteland 2	Linux, macOS, Microsoft Windows, Nintendo Switch, PlayStation 4, Xbox One
2017	Torment: Tides of Numenera	Linux, macOS, Microsoft Windows, PlayStation 4, Xbox One
2017	The Mage's Tale	Microsoft Windows, PlayStation 4
2018	The Impossible Quiz!	App Store
2018	The Bard's Tale IV: Barrows Deep	Linux, macOS, Microsoft Windows, PlayStation 4, Xbox One
2020	Wasteland Remastered	Microsoft Windows, Xbox One
2020	Wasteland 3	Linux, macOS, Microsoft Windows, PlayStation 4, Xbox One
2020	Frostpoint VR: Proving Grounds	Microsoft Windows
2027	Clockwork Revolution	Microsoft Windows, Xbox Series X/S

=== Cancelled games ===
Title	Platform(s)
Heist	Microsoft Windows, PlayStation 3, Xbox 360
