= List of role-playing video games: 1990 to 1991 =

This is a comprehensive index of commercial role-playing video games (RPGs), sorted chronologically by year. Information regarding release platform, release type, RPG subgenre, game setting, developers, publishers, and country of origin is provided where available. The table can be sorted by clicking on the small boxes next to the column headings.

This list includes all RPG subgenres, including MMORPGs, Action RPGs and Tactical RPGs. This list does not include MUDs and Roguelikes by default, unless they have an additional RPG subgenre. For standalone lists on these subgenres, see List of MUDs and List of roguelikes

== Legend ==
Video game platforms
AMI	Amiga	APPII	Apple II	ATRST	Atari ST, Atari Falcon
C64	Commodore 64	CPC	Amstrad CPC	DOS	PC DOS / MS-DOS, Windows 3.X
GB	Game Boy	GEN	Genesis / Mega Drive	GG	Game Gear
MAC	Classic Mac OS, 2001 and before	MSX	MSX	MSX2	MSX2
NEO	Neo Geo AES	NES	Nintendo Entertainment System / Famicom	PC88	PC-8800 series
PC98	PC-9800 series	PCE	TurboGrafx-16 / PC Engine	SMS	Master System
SNES	Super NES / Super Famicom / Super Comboy	X68K	X68000	ZX	ZX Spectrum

Types of releases
Compilation	A compilation, anthology or collection of several titles, usually (but not always) belonging to the same series
Early access	A game launched in early access is unfinished and thus might contain bugs and glitches or have some of the content missing
Episodic	An episodic video game that is released in batches over a period of time
Expansion	A large-scale DLC to an already existing game that adds new story, areas and additions and/or changes to the game's mechanics
Full release	A full release of a game that launched in early access first
Limited	A special release (often called "Limited" or "Collector's Edition") with bonus collector's material. Often provided to people who pre-order a game
Port	The game first appeared on a different platform and a port was made. The game is like the original, with few or no differences
Remake	The game is an enhanced remake of an original, made using a new engine and/or assets and thus containing completely new sound, graphics and possibly changes to the story and/or gameplay
Remaster	The game is a remaster of an original, released on the same or different platform, with (usually minor) changes to graphics, sound and/or gameplay
Rerelease	The game was re-released on the same platform with no or only minor changes

Video game genres
Action RPG	Action role-playing game	Dungeon crawl	Dungeon crawl	JRPG	Japanese-style role-playing game
MMORPG	Massively multiplayer online RPG	Monster tamer	Monster-taming game	MUD	Multi-user dungeon
Real-time	Real-time game	Roguelike	Roguelike, Roguelite	Sandbox	Sandbox game
Soulslike	Soulslike	Tactical RPG	Tactical role-playing game	Turn-based	Turn-based game

== List ==
Year	Title	Developer	Publisher	Setting	Platform	Subgenre	Series/Notes	COO
1990 (JP)	46 Okunen Monogatari: The Shinkaron (JA)		Enix	Fantasy	PC98	JRPG		JP
1990 (NA)	AD&D Limited Edition Collector's Set	SSI	SSI	Fantasy	DOS (Comp)	Various	Advanced Dungeons & Dragons: Compilation of many early games, including several Gold Box games.	US
1990 (JP)	Akuma-kun: Makai no Wana (JA) 悪魔くん・魔界の罠 (JA)	Bandai	Bandai	Fantasy	NES	JRPG	Based on the manga Akuma-kun	JP
1990 (JP)	Aretha (JA) アレサ (JA)	Japan Art Media	Yanoman	Fantasy	GB	JRPG	Aretha	JP
1991 (JP)	Aretha II (JA) アレサ II (JA)	Japan Art Media	Yanoman	Fantasy	GB	JRPG	Aretha	JP
1990 (JP)	Ayakashi no Shiro (JA)	Seta	Seta	Fantasy	GB	JRPG dungeon crawler		JP
1990 (NA); 1991 (NA)	Bard's Tale III, The: Thief of Fate	Interplay	EA	Fantasy	DOS (Port), AMI (Port)	Dungeon crawl	The Bard's Tale	US
1990 (NA)	The Bard's Tale Trilogy	Interplay	EA	Fantasy	DOS (Comp)	Dungeon crawl	The Bard's Tale	US
1990 (EU)	BSS Jane Seymour	Gremlin	Gremlin	Sci-Fi	AMI, ATRST	Dungeon crawl		UK
1990 (NA/UK)	Champions of Krynn	SSI	SSI; U.S. Gold	Fantasy	APPII, AMI, C64, DOS	Tactical RPG	Advanced Dungeons & Dragons: Dragonlance; Utilizes the Gold Box engine.	US
1990 (JP)	Cosmic Fantasy: Bouken Shounen Yuu (JA)	Telenet Japan	Telenet Japan	Fantasy	PCE	JRPG	Based on the Original Video Animation Cosmic Fantasy	JP
1990 (JP/NA)	Crystalis (EN); God Slayer: Haruka Tenkū no Sonata (JA)	SNK	SNK	Fantasy	NES	Action RPG / Action-Adventure		JP
1990 (EU)	Crystals of Arborea	Silmarils	Silmarils	Fantasy	AMI, DOS, ATRST	CRPG	Ishar	FR
1990 (JP)	Cyber Knight (EN)	Tonkin House		Sci-Fi	PCE	JRPG	Cyber Knight	JP
1990 (NA); 1991 (NA)	DarkSpyre	Event Horizon; Software Sorcery	Electronic Zoo	Fantasy	DOS, AMI (Port)	Action RPG		US
1990 (JP)	Digital Devil Story: Megami Tensei 2 (JA)	Atlus	Namco	Fantasy	NES	JRPG	Megami Tensei	JP
1990 (JP)	Dragon Knight (EN)	ELF	Megatech	Fantasy	MSX	Eroge	Dragon Knight	JP
1990 (JP)	Dragon Slayer (EN)	Nihon Falcom	Square	Fantasy	GB (Port)	Action RPG	Dragon Slayer	JP
1990 (JP)	Dragon Slayer: The Legend of Heroes (EN)	Nihon Falcom	Nihon Falcom; Hudson Soft	Fantasy	MSX2 (Port)	JRPG	Dragon Slayer: The Legend of Heroes	JP
1990 (EU)	Dragonflight	Thalion	Thalion	Fantasy	AMI, ATRST			DE
1990 (NA/UK)	Dragons of Flame	U.S. Gold	SSI; U.S. Gold	Fantasy	C64 (Port), CPC (Port), ZX (Port)	Action RPG	Advanced Dungeons & Dragons: Dragonlance	US/UK
1990 (JP); 1992 (NA)	Dragon Warrior IV (EN); Dragon Quest IV: Michibikareshi Monotachi (JA)	Chunsoft	Enix	Fantasy	NES	JRPG	Dragon Quest	JP
1990 (NA)	DragonStrike	Westwood	SSI; U.S. Gold	Fantasy	AMI, C64, DOS	Action RPG (flight sim)	Advanced Dungeons & Dragons: Dragonlance	US
1990 (JP)	Emerald Dragon (EN)	Glodia	Glodia	Fantasy	MSX2, X68K (Port)	JRPG		JP
1990 (JP)	Final Fantasy III (EN)	Square	Square	Fantasy	NES	JRPG	Final Fantasy	JP
1990 (JP); 1991 (NA)	Final Fantasy Legend II (EN); Sa・Ga 2: 秘宝伝説 (JA)	Square	Square	Fantasy	GB	JRPG	SaGa	JP
1990 (JP)	Fire Emblem: Ankoku Ryū to Hikari no Tsurugi (JA) ファイアーエムブレム 暗黒竜と光の剣 (JA)	Intelligent	Nintendo	Fantasy	NES	Tactical RPG	Fire Emblem	JP
1990 (NA)	Fountain of Dreams	EA	EA	Post-apocalyptic	DOS	WRPG	Spiritual sequel to Wasteland	US
1990 (JP); 1991 (JP)	Fray in Magical Adventure (EN); Fray: Shuugyou-hen (JA) フレイ 修行編 (JA)	Micro Cabin	Micro Cabin	Fantasy	MSX, MSX2, GG (Port)	Action RPG	Xak spin-off	JP
1990 (JP)	Ganbare Goemon Gaiden: Kieta Ougon Kiseru (JA) がんばれゴエモン外伝 きえた黄金キセル (JA)	Konami	Konami	Fantasy	NES	JRPG	Ganbare Goemon spin-off	JP
1990 (NA); 1991 (NA)	Hard Nova	Malibu; Abersoft	EA	Sci-Fi	DOS, AMI (Port), ATRST (Port)	WRPG	Sentinel Worlds	US
1990 (NA)	Hero's Quest: So You Want to Be a Hero; Quest for Glory: So You Want to Be a Hero	Sierra	Sierra	Fantasy	AMI (Port), ATRST (Port)	Adventure RPG	Quest for Glory	US
1990 (JP)	Jajamaru Gekimaden: Maboroshi no Kinmajou (JA)		Jaleco		NES	Action RPG	Ninja-Kid: Ninja Jajamaru-kun	JP
1990 (NA); 1991 (NA)	Keys to Maramon, The	Mindcraft; Knight	Mindscape; Mindcraft	Fantasy	DOS, AMI (Port), C64 (Port)	Action RPG	Magic Candle	US
1990 (JP)	Last Armageddon (EN)	Braingrey Mind	Yutaka	Post-apocalyptic Fantasy	NES, DOS, PCE (Port)	JRPG	Last Armageddon	JP
1990 (EU)	Legend of Faerghail	Electronic Design Hannover	reLine	Fantasy	AMI, DOS, ATRST			DE
1990 (US)	Lord of the Rings, Vol. I, The	Interplay	Interplay	Fantasy	DOS			US
1990 (JP)	Madō Monogatari 1-2-3 (JP)	Compile (JP)	Compile (JP)	Fantasy	MSX	Dungeon crawl	Madō Monogatari	JP
1990 (JP)	Mōryō Senki MADARA (JA)	Konami	Konami	Fantasy	NES	Tactical RPG	Based on the manga Madara	JP
1990 (NA)	Might and Magic II: Gates to Another World	New World	New World	Fantasy	AMI (Port)	WRPG	Might and Magic	US
1990 (JP)	Momotarou Densetsu II (JA)	Hudson Soft	Hudson Soft	Fantasy	PCE	JRPG	Momotarou Densetsu	JP
1990 (JP)	Momotarou Densetsu Turbo (JA)	Hudson Soft	Hudson Soft	Fantasy	PCE	JRPG	Momotarou Densetsu	JP
1990 (JP)	Mugen no Shinzō III (JA)	Xtalsoft	Xtalsoft	Fantasy	PC88	JRPG	Mugen no Shinzō	JP
1990 (JP)	Musashi no Bouken (JA)	Quest Corporation	Sigma Entertainment	Fantasy	NES	JRPG		JP
1990 (NA)	Phantasie: Bonus Edition	SSI; Andromeda; Westwood	SSI; WizardWorks; Westwood	Fantasy	DOS (Comp), AMI (Port)		Phantasie: Compilation of I, III and Questron II	US
1990 (JP); 1991 (NA/EU)	Phantasy Star III: Generations of Doom (EN)	Sega	Sega	Sci-Fi	GEN	JRPG	Phantasy Star	JP
1990 (NA); 1991 (NA)	Pool of Radiance: Secret of the Silver Blades	SSI; MicroMagic	SSI	Fantasy	C64, DOS, AMI (Port), MAC (Port)	Tactical RPG	Advanced Dungeons & Dragons: Forgotten Realms setting; Utilizes the Gold Box engine	US
1990 (NA)	Quest for Glory II: Trial by Fire	Sierra	Sierra	Fantasy	AMI, DOS, MAC	Adventure RPG	Quest for Glory	US
1990 (JP)	Sol Bianca (EN)	Masaya	NCS	Sci-fi	PCE	JRPG	Based on the OVA Sol Bianca	JP
1990 (JP); 1991 (JP)	Sorcerian (EN)	Nihon Falcom; Tierheit	Sega; Takeru	Fantasy	GEN (Port), MSX2 (Port)	Platform / RPG hybrid.	Dragon Slayer: Sorcerian	JP
1990 (NA)	Space Rogue	Origin	Origin	Sci-Fi	AMI (Port), ATRST (Port)	Space sim/RPG		US
1990 (NA/EU)	Starflight	MicroMagic	EA	Sci-Fi	MAC (Port), ATRST (Port)	Space RPG	Starflight	US
1990 (NA)	Swords and Serpents (EN)	Interplay	Acclaim	Fantasy	NES	Dungeon crawler		US
1990 (NA)	Tunnels & Trolls: Crusaders of Khazan	Liz Danforth	New World	Fantasy	DOS	WRPG	Tunnels & Trolls	US
1990 (JP)	Ultima I: The First Age of Darkness (EN)	Richard Garriott	California Pacific	Fantasy	APPII (Remake), C64, PC98 (Port)	Ultima I-style RPG	Ultima	US
1990 (??)	Ultima: Quest of the Avatar (EN); Ultima IV: Quest of the Avatar (EN)	Origin; FCI	Origin; Pony Canyon	Fantasy	NES (Port), SMS (Port)		Ultima	US
1990 (NA); 1991 (NA)	Ultima VI: The False Prophet	Origin	Origin	Fantasy	DOS, C64 (Port), ATRST (Port)	WRPG	Ultima	US
1990 (JP); 1991 (NA)	Wizardry II: The Knight of Diamonds (EN)	Game	ASCII	Fantasy	NES (Port)	Dungeon crawl	Wizardry	US/JP
1990 (JP)	Wizardry III: Legacy of Llylgamyn (EN)	Sir-Tech	ASCII	Fantasy	NES, MSX2 (Port)	Dungeon crawl.	Wizardry.	JP
1990 (NA); 1991 (NA)	Wizardry VI: Bane of the Cosmic Forge	Sir-Tech	Sir-Tech	Fantasy	AMI, DOS, MAC (Port)	Dungeon crawl	Wizardry	US
1990 (NA/JP)	Worlds of Ultima: The Savage Empire (EN)	Origin	Origin	Fantasy	DOS, PC98 (Port), SNES (Port)	WRPG	Ultima: Worlds of Ultima; features the Ultima VI engine	US
1990 (JP)	Xak II: The Rising of the Red Moon (EN) サークII (JA)	Microcabin	Microcabin	Fantasy	MSX2, PC88, PC98, X68K	Action RPG	Xak	JP
1990 (JP)	Xuan-Yuan Sword	DOMO Studio	Softstar Entertainment	Fantasy	DOS, WIN	Action RPG	Xuan-Yuan Sword	TW
1990 (??)	Ys II: Ancient Ys Vanished - The Final Chapter (EN)	Nihon Falcom		Fantasy	PCE (Port), NES (Port)	Action RPG	Ys	JP
1991 (JP)	2nd Super Robot Wars (EN)	Banpresto	Banpresto	Sci-Fi	NES	Tactical RPG	Super Robot Wars	JP
1991 (JP/NA); 1990 (NA)	Advanced Dungeons and Dragon: Curse of the Azure Bonds (EN)	SSI; MicroMagic	SSI; Pony Canyon	Fantasy	AMI (Port), MAC (Port), ATRST (Port), PC98 (Port)	Tactical RPG	Advanced Dungeons & Dragons: Forgotten Realms setting; used the Gold Box engine	US
1991 (JP/NA)	Advanced Dungeons and Dragons: Heroes of the Lance (EN)	U.S. Gold	Pony Canyon	Fantasy	MSX2, NES (Port)	Action RPG	Advanced Dungeons & Dragons: Dragonlance franchise	US/UK
1991 (JP); 1992 (NA)	Advanced Dungeons and Dragons: Hillsfar (EN)	SSI	Pony Canyon; FCI	Fantasy	NES (Port)	Action RPG	Advanced Dungeons & Dragons: Forgotten Realms setting	US
1991 (JP)	Aquales (EN) アクアレス (JA)	Exact	Exact	Dystopian Future	X68K	Action RPG	Run and gun video game, from same team who worked on Naious	JP
1990 (NA/UK); 1991 (JP); 1992 (NA)	Pool of Radiance	SSI; Marionette; Ubisoft	SSI; U.S. Gold; FCI; Pony Canyon	Fantasy	AMI (Port), NES (Port)	Tactical RPG	Advanced Dungeons & Dragons: Forgotten Realms setting; used the Gold Box engine	US
1991 (JP/NA)	Arcus Odyssey (EN)	Wolf Team	Renovation Products	Fantasy	X68K, GEN, SNES	Action RPG	Arcus	JP
1991 (JP/NA/PAL)	Ax Battler: A Legend of Golden Axe (EN)	Aspect	Sega	Fantasy	GG	Action RPG	Golden Axe	JP
1991 (JP)	Bahamut Senki (JA)	Sega	Sega	Fantasy	GEN	Tactical RPG		JP
1991 (JP/NA)	Bard's Tale, The (EN)	Interplay	FCI; Pony Canyon	Fantasy	NES (Port)	Dungeon crawl	The Bard's Tale	US
1991 (JP)	Bard's Tale II: The Destiny Knight (EN)	Interplay	FCI; Pony Canyon	Fantasy	PC98 (Port)	Dungeon crawl	The Bard's Tale	US
1991 (NA)	The Bard's Tale Construction Set	Interplay	Interplay	Fantasy	DOS	Design suite	The Bard's Tale engine	US
1991 (JP)	Brandish (EN)	Nihon Falcom	Nihon Falcom	Fantasy	PC98	Action RPG	Brandish	JP
1990 (NA); 1991 (NA)	Buck Rogers: Countdown to Doomsday (EN)	SSI	SSI	Sci-Fi	AMI, C64, DOS, GEN	Tactical RPG	Based on the Buck Rogers comics; used the Gold Box engine	US
1991 (JP)	Chaos World (EN)	Natsume	Natsume	Fantasy	NES	Tactical RPG		JP
1991 (JP)	Cosmic Fantasy 2 Bouken Shounen Van (JA)	Shin-Nihon Laser Soft Company	Telenet Japan, Working Designs	Fantasy/Sci-Fi	PCE	JRPG	Based on the OVA Cosmic Fantasy	JP
1991 (JP/NA)	Crossed Swords (EN)	ADK	SNK	Fantasy	NEO	Action RPG		JP
1991 (JP); 1992 (NA)	Crystal Warriors (EN)	Sega	Sega	Fantasy	GG	Tactical RPG	Crystal Warriors	JP
1991 (NA/UK)	Dragonlance: Death Knights of Krynn	SSI	SSI; U.S. Gold	Fantasy	AMI, C64, DOS	Tactical RPG	Advanced Dungeons & Dragons: Dragonlance; Utilizes the Gold Box engine.	US
1991 (JP)	Dragon Knight II (EN) ドラゴンナイト2 (JA)	ELF	ELF	Fantasy	MSX, DOS	JRPG; Eroge.	Dragon Knight	JP
1991 (JP); 1992 (NA)	Dragon Slayer: The Legend of Heroes (EN)	Nihon Falcom	Nihon Falcom; Hudson Soft	Fantasy	PCD (Port)	JRPG	Dragon Slayer: The Legend of Heroes	JP
1991 (NA)	Drakkhen (EN)	Draconian (Data East); Kemco-Seika	Infogrames	Fantasy	SNES (Port)	Adventure WRPG	Drakkhen	FR
1991 (JP); 1992 (NA); 1993 (EU)	Dungeon Master (EN)	FTL	FTL	Fantasy	SNES (Port)	Dungeon crawl	Dungeon Master	US
1991 (JP)	Exile (EN); XZR II: Toki No Hazama (JA)	Telenet Japan; Working Designs; Renovation	Historical fantasy	Sci-Fi	GEN (Remake), PCE (Remake)	Action RPG	Exile	JP
1991 (NA/UK)	Eye of the Beholder	Westwood	SSI; U.S. Gold	Fantasy	AMI, DOS	Dungeon crawl	Advanced Dungeons & Dragons: Forgotten Realms setting; Eye of the Beholder	US
1991 (NA)	Eye of the Beholder II: The Legend of Darkmoon	Westwood	SSI	Fantasy	DOS	Dungeon crawl	Eye of the Beholder	US
1991 (NA)	Faery Tale Adventure, The (EN)	MicroIllusions	EA	Fantasy	GEN (Port)	Action RPG	The Faery Tale Adventure	US
1991 (JP)	Famicom Jump II: Saikyō no Shichinin (JA)	Chunsoft	Bandai	Sci-Fi	NES	Action RPG	Famicom Jump: Based on the anime and manga, JoJo's Bizarre Adventure	JP
1991 (DE)	Fate: Gates of Dawn	reLine	reLine	Fantasy	AMI, ATRST			DE
1991 (JP/NA)	Final Fantasy IV (EN)	Square	Square	Fantasy	SNES	JRPG	Final Fantasy	JP
1991 (JP/NA); 1993 (EU)	Final Fantasy Adventure (EN); Seiken Densetsu: Final Fantasy Gaiden (JA); Mystic Quest (EN)	Square	Square	Fantasy	GB	Action RPG	Mana	JP
1991 (JP); 1993 (NA)	Final Fantasy Legend III (EN); Sa•Ga 3: 時空の覇者 (JA)	Square	Square	Fantasy	GB	JRPG	SaGa	JP
1991 (NA)	Gateway to the Savage Frontier	Beyond	SSI	Fantasy	AMI, C64, DOS	Tactical RPG	Advanced Dungeons & Dragons: Forgotten Realms setting; Utilizes the Gold Box engine	US
1991 (??)	GD Leen (EN)	Jorudan	SETA	Sci-fi	SNES (Port)	JRPG	Based on the OVA Gdleen	JP
1991 (NA/PAL)	Golden Axe Warrior (EN)	Sega	Sega	Fantasy	SMS	Action RPG	Golden Axe	JP
1991 (JP)	Inindo: Way of the Ninja (EN); Inindo: Datou Nobunaga (JA) 伊忍道打倒信長 (JA)	Koei	Koei	Fantasy	MSX2	JRPG	Spin-off of Nobunaga's Ambition	JP
1991 (JP); 1992 (NA); 1993 (EU)	Legend of the Mystical Ninja, The (EN); Ganbare Goemon: Yukihime Kyuushutsu Emaki (JA) がんばれゴエモン ゆき姫救出絵巻 (JA)	Konami	Konami	Fantasy	SNES	Action RPG	Ganbare Goemon	JP
1991 (JP); 1992 (NA); 1993 (EU)	Lagoon (EN)	ZOOM	Kemco	Fantasy	SNES	Action RPG		JP
1991 (JP)	Lagrange Point (EN)	Konami	Konami	Sci-Fi	NES	JRPG		JP
1991 (NA)	Magic Candle II, The: The Four and Forty	Mindcraft	EA	Fantasy	DOS	WRPG	The Magic Candle	US
1991 (NA)	Magician	Eurocom	Taxan	Fantasy	NES	Action RPG		GB
1991 (NA)	Ultima: Worlds of Adventure 2: Martian Dreams	Origin	Origin	Steampunk	DOS	WRPG	Ultima: Worlds of Ultima; using Ultima 6 engine	US
1991 (JP)	Mateki Densetsu Astralius (JA)	Atlus: Multimedia Intelligence Transfer	IGS Corp	Fantasy	PCE	JRPG		JP
1991 (??)	Metal Max (EN)	Createch	Data East	Sci-Fi	NES	Vehicular combat, JRPG	Metal Max	JP
1991 (NA)	Might and Magic III: Isles of Terra	New World	New World	Fantasy	DOS	WRPG	Might and Magic	US
1991 (EU)	Moonstone: A Hard Days Knight	Rob Anderson	Mindscape	Fantasy	AMI, DOS	Action RPG		CA
1991 (JP)	Niji no Silkroad (JA)	NHK	Victor Musical Industries	Historical fantasy	NES	JRPG		JP
1991 (NA)	Obitus	Scenario	Psygnosis	Fantasy	AMI, DOS, ATRST	Action RPG		UK
1991 (JP)	Otaku no Seiza: An Adventure in the Otaku Galaxy (JA) おたくの星座 (JA)	Advance Communications	M&M	Sci-Fi	NES	JRPG		JP
1991 (NA)	Planet's Edge	New World	New World	Sci-Fi	DOS	Space RPG		US
1991 (NA)	Pools of Darkness	SSI	SSI	Fantasy	DOS	Tactical RPG	Advanced Dungeons & Dragons: Forgotten Realms setting; Utilizes the Gold Box engine	US
1991 (JP)	Popful Mail	Nihon Falcom	Nihon Falcom	Fantasy	PC88, PC98	Action RPG (Platformer)		JP
1991 (JP)	Radia Senki: Reimeihen (JA)	Tecmo	Tecmo	Fantasy	NES	Action RPG		JP
1991 (??)	Rings of Power (EN)	Naughty Dog	EA	Fantasy	GEN	WRPG		US
1991 (NA/EU)	Shadow Sorcerer	U.S. Gold	SSI	Fantasy	AMI, DOS, ATRST	Action RPG	Advanced Dungeons & Dragons: Dragonlance	US/UK
1991 (JP/NA/PAL)	Shining in the Darkness (EN)	Climax; Sonic!	Sega	Fantasy	GEN	Dungeon crawl	Shining	JP
1991 (JP)	Sorcerian Add-on Sengoku (EN)	Takeru	Takeru	Fantasy	MSX2 (Port)	Platform / RPG hybrid	Dragon Slayer: Sorcerian	JP
1991 (NA/DE)	Spirit of Adventure	Attic	Starbyte	Fantasy	AMI, C64, DOS, ATRST	Dungeon crawl		DE
1991 (NA)	Starflight 2: Trade Routes of the Cloud Nebula	MicroMagic	EA	Sci-Fi	AMI (Port), MAC (Port)	Space RPG	Starflight	US
1991 (JP)	Sugoro Quest: Dice no Senshi Tachi (EN)	Technōs Japan		Fantasy	NES	JRPG	Sugoro	JP
1991 (JP)	Super Robot Wars (EN)	Banpresto	Banpresto	Sci-Fi	GB	Tactical RPG	Super Robot Wars	JP
1991 (??)	Sword of Hope (EN)	Seika	Kemco	Fantasy	GB	Adventure RPG	Sword of Hope	JP
1991 (JP)	Tenchi o Kurau II: Shokatsu Koumei Den (JA)	Capcom	Capcom	Fantasy	NES	JRPG	Destiny of an Emperor	JP
1990 (NA); 1991 (??)	Ultima: Warriors of Destiny (EN); Ultima V: Warriors of Destiny (EN)	Origin	Origin; FCI; Pony Canyon	Fantasy	AMI (Port), NES (Port)		Ultima	US
1991 (JP/NA)	Warsong (EN); Langrisser (EN) ラングリッサー (JA)	CareerSoft	NCS; Treco	Fantasy	GEN	Tactical RPG	Warsong	JP
1991 (JP)	Xak: The Tower of Gazzel (EN); Xak - ガゼルの塔 - (JA)	Microcabin	Microcabin	Fantasy	MSX2, PC88, PC98	Action RPG	Xak	JP
1991 (??)	Ys III: Wanderers from Ys (EN)	Nihon Falcom		Fantasy	NES, SNES, GEN, PCE (Port)	Action RPG (Platformer)	Ys	JP
