= Aretha (disambiguation) =

Aretha Franklin (1942–2018) was an American singer, songwriter, and pianist.

Aretha may also refer to:

== People ==
- Aretha Brown (born 2000), Indigenous Australian youth activist
- Aretha Teckentrup, British mathematician
- Aretha Thurmond (born 1976), American discus thrower

== Arts and entertainment ==
- Aretha (1961 album), an album by Aretha Franklin with the Ray Bryant Combo
- Aretha (1980 album), an album by Aretha Franklin
- Aretha (1986 album), an album by Aretha Franklin
- "Aretha" (song), a song by British singer-songwriter Rumer
- Aretha (video game series), a Japanese role-playing video game series
  - Aretha (video game), a 1990 Game Boy video game

== See also ==
- Arethas (disambiguation)
- Retha, a given name
