= DreamMix TV World Fighters =

2003 video game

- GameCube box art, featuring the game's starting roster
- Developer: Bitstep
- Publisher: Hudson Soft
- Director: Satoru Kirishima
- Producer: Masanori Wake
- Programmer: Nobuyuki Nishiyama
- Artists: Nobuyuki Kanō; Tadao Hirafune
- Composer: Yasuhiro Kawasaki
- Engine: RenderWare
- Platforms: GameCube, PlayStation 2
- Release: JP: December 18, 2003
- Genre: Fighting
- Modes: Single-player, multiplayer

DreamMix TV World Fighters (Note: Japanese: ドリームミックスTV ワールドファイターズ, Hepburn: Dorīmumikkusu Tībī Wārudo Faitāzu) is a 2003 crossover fighting video game developed by Bitstep and published by Hudson Soft for the GameCube and PlayStation 2. Exclusively released in Japan on December 18, 2003, the game features characters from Hudson and Konami video game series as well as Takara's toy lines.

== Gameplay ==
DreamMix TV is a platform fighter, in which up to four player-controlled characters move around a 2D arena and attempt to defeat their opponents. Each character can perform a series of basic attacks and one or two unique special moves. Characters can also throw their opponents, guard and dodge to avoid damage, or cling to hanging bars to evade opponents. The game revolves around damaging opponents by causing them to lose coins that represent their remaining life. A meter at the bottom of the screen indicates how much life characters have remaining. If a player loses all of their coins, their character shrinks in size and their soul flies around the stage. If an opponent retrieves the soul before the player character can, the player character is knocked out, though they can still move around the stage in shrunken form to interfere with the remaining characters. The last character standing at the end of the round wins. The game offers 15 stages on which to battle based on various franchises, such as Big Shell, Adventure Island, Floating Continent and Devastator. Some stages offer occasional hazards that will disrupt battle and inflict additional damage, such as floating Medusa heads in Dracula's Castle.

The primary single player campaign is World Fighters, an arcade mode with interstitial story cutscenes. In the story, the DreamMix TV network's fledgling World Fighters television program has been suffering from poor audience approval. To increase ratings, hosts Mujoe and Haruna invite various superstars from differing realities to compete on the show. Players must win six battles against a pre-determined series of opponents before entering a final battle with Mujoe. The show's ratings will increase and decrease during these battles based on the player's performance; if the ratings reach 0%, the player immediately loses. Players are ranked from D to A based on their average ratings at the end of the campaign. New characters and stages are unlocked by completing World Fighters with specific characters. The game also features Character Soul Survival, a standard multiplayer battle mode for up to four players; Caravan mode, which offers several score-based challenges; and a Library section for viewing unlockable character and stage profiles; new profiles can be unlocked by achieving an A-Rank in World Fighters with each character.

=== Playable characters ===
DreamMix TV offers 17 playable characters originating from various video game and toy franchises created by Hudson Soft, Konami and Takara. In addition to the playable characters, recurring Bomberman villain Mujoe appears in the story as one of the World Fighters hosts and as the game's final boss, aided by his Hige-Hige Bandits. An original character named Haruna acts as the announcer during gameplay, and appears in story mode cutscenes as Mujoe's co-host. The following characters are playable:

Hudson	Konami	Takara
Binbōgami (Momotarō Densetsu); Bomberman (Bomberman); Manjimaru Sengoku (Tengai Makyō); Master Higgins (Adventure Island); Momotarō (Momotarō Densetsu); Yūgo Ōgami (Bloody Roar)	Moai (Gradius); Power Pro-kun (Power Pros); Simon Belmont (Castlevania); Solid Snake (Metal Gear); TwinBee (TwinBee)	Aska (Cy Girls); Licca Kayama (Licca-chan); M121 Mason (Microman); Megatron (Transformers); Optimus Prime (Transformers); Tyson Granger (Beyblade)

== Development ==
The game came about as Konami held a controlling stake in Takara since 2000, and Hudson Soft since 2001; Konami would later sell their Takara shares in 2005, and merge with Hudson Soft in 2012. Takara did not permit Licca to directly attack opponents, so the development team chose to have her attack by performing dance moves instead.

== Reception ==
Reception

Review scores
Publication	Score
Famitsu	27/40
Nintendo World Report	8/10

DreamMix TV World Fighters received mixed reception from critics. Siliconera described it as "a copy of Smash Brothers without the charm", criticizing the poor gameplay, lack of content, and frustrating camera. Nintendo World Report was more positive, believing that despite the simple gameplay and poor AI, it was unique enough from the Super Smash Bros. series to justify a purchase.
