= Christopher Erhardt =

Head of School

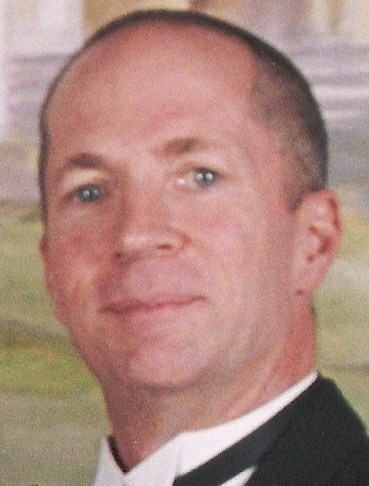
- Born: December 23, 1958; Seattle, Washington
- Died: December 3, 2012 (aged 53); Issaquah, Washington
- Occupations: Head of School, AIE US Campuses

Christopher Erhardt (December 23, 1958 – December 3, 2012) was the Head of School - US Campuses for the Academy of Interactive Entertainment (AIE) from the time the school opened until his death. From 1998 to 2007 he was the Associate Dean as well as V.P.-Production at DigiPen Institute of Technology in the United States.

== Biography ==
During the first 10 years of his life, Christopher Erhardt lived in Seattle, Washington, Detroit, Michigan, Riverside, California, and Arcadia, California. He received a Bachelor of Science from the University of San Francisco, did graduate studies in psychology at Harvard University and acquired his master's degree in business from Capella University. In 2008 he completed his doctoral dissertation on video game players and demographic considerations and he was awarded his PhD from Cappella in 2010. Erhardt had over 19 years of experience in the Interactive Media Industry, where he was responsible for the production, design and product management of more than 22 titles with such publishers as Infocom, Activision, Electronic Arts, Infogrames, and Ocean Software of America.

Erhardt started working at an early age, putting himself through his undergraduate degree by odd jobs that ranged from magician to fur currier to line chef. In the early 80s he was a product planner for companies such as Teledyne and other TEMPEST secured, MIS-based programming and project management tasks. He moved into the game industry in 1987 when Infocom requested his assistance in transitioning them from text-only games into graphical titles, leveraging his education in adolescent psychology to help them develop more compelling titles.

Erhardt was the President of ISOG based at Hyderabad, India, until June 2009.

In December 2010, it was announced that Erhardt would be the head of the new Seattle branch of the Academy of Interactive Entertainment, which offers certificate programs and continuing education courses in digital media, game development, special effects and film production.

== Games credited on ==
Year	Game	Platform	Role/duty	Company
1988	Battletech: The Crescent Hawk's Inception	Amiga, Apple II, Atari ST, Commodore 64, DOS	Producer	Infocom
1988	Quarterstaff: The Tomb of Setmoth	Macintosh	Producer	Infocom
1989	Arthur: The Quest for Excalibur	DOS	Producer	Infocom
1989	Pool of Radiance	Macintosh	Producer, sound designer	Strategic Simulations
1990	Circuit's Edge	DOS	Producer	Infocom
1990	Chiller	Nintendo Entertainment System	Designer	ShareData
1990	Hard Nova	Amiga, Atari ST, DOS	Producer	Electronic Arts
1990	Battle Squadron	Sega Genesis	Producer	Electronic Arts
1990	Sword of Sodan	Sega Genesis	Producer	Electronic Arts
1990	Spider-Man	Sega Genesis, Master System	Designer	Sega of America
1991	James Pond	Sega Genesis	Producer	Electronic Arts
1991	James Pond II: Codename Robocod	Sega Genesis	Producer	Electronic Arts
1991	Rings of Power	Sega Genesis	Producer	Electronic Arts
1991	Starflight	Sega Genesis	Executive producer	Electronic Arts
1992	Black Crypt	Amiga	Producer	Electronic Arts
1992	The Lost Files of Sherlock Holmes: The Case of the Serrated Scalpel	DOS, 3DO	Producer, video director	Electronic Arts
1994	Noctropolis	DOS	Video director	Electronic Arts
1995	Pocahontas	DOS	Executive producer	GT Interactive
1996	Total Control Football	DOS, Windows	Producer/Product manager	Philips Media
2007	Synaesthete	Windows	Executive producer	DigiPen
2008	Nocturnal: Boston Nightfall	Windows	Designer, producer	Big Fish Games
2009	Route 66	Windows	Designer, producer	Big Fish Games
2009	Rangy Lil's Wild West Adventure	Windows	Designer, producer	Gameshastra

== Academic career ==
In 1998, Erhardt transitioned into an academic environment and became a professor of Game Design and Production at DigiPen Institute of Technology. In 2000 he was responsible for co-creating, with Alex Dunne, the student submissions category of the Game Developers Conference Independent Games Submission. In 2002 he moved to Beirut, Lebanon and spent two years teaching game software design and production to French and Arabic speaking computer engineering students. In 2005, upon his return to the US, he approached Valve to develop a level design program at DigiPen using their FPS engine. In 2006 he worked with Microsoft Game Studios to bring XNA product development into DigiPen and inaugurated one of the first series of C#/XNA Game Studio Express product development programs at an accredited academic institution.

In 2007 Erhardt left DigiPen Institute of Technology and moved to India to head ISOG.

== 2005-2007 public presentations ==
- Co-presenter: GDC 2005 session ("The DigiPen Video Game Curriculum: From the Game to the Classroom")
- Moderator: PAX 2006 ("Gaming and Controversy")
- Moderator: November 2005 Game Producers Boot Camp
- Speaker: WritersUA 2006 ("User Assistance in Video Gaming")
- Panelist 2006 Games Initiative ('Applying Transferable Skill Sets')
- Panelist: 2006 E3 Expo ('The New Gamemaker: Trends in the trenches of game making and publishing')
- Member: Seattle Bureau of Trade-2007 World Cybergames Steering Committee
- Moderator: PAX 2007 ("Growing Old in Gaming", "Getting an education in Gaming")
- Presenter: VGEXPO 2007 ("Education and Gaming")
- Presenter: GDC 2011 session ("Surviving an Education at a Game School and Graduating Employable")
