= Momotarō Dentetsu =

Japanese video game series

Momotarō Dentetsu (桃太郎電鉄, Momotarō Dentetsu; Momotarō Electric Railway) (also known by the abbreviated name Momotetsu) is a long-running digital tabletop game series in Japan; in which players travel by rail, ship, and airplane; attempting to acquire wealth through business transactions buying properties; and dealing with rival entrepreneurs and nemeses such as the God of Poverty (貧乏神, Binbōgami). The game mechanics are often compared to the board games sugoroku and Monopoly.

== History ==
Started in 1988, the series was initially produced by Hudson Soft. The rights to the series are now owned by Konami Corporation, who absorbed Hudson in 2012. This series is spin-off from another video game series by Hudson Soft, Momotarō Densetsu (Densetsu meaning "Legend" and Dentetsu meaning "Electric Railway"). The project supervisor for the series is Akira Sakuma, with illustration by Takayuki Doi (土居 孝幸) and main music production by Kazuyuki Sekiguchi of Southern All Stars. In some works, Kazuaki Miyaji (宮路 一昭) and Takeshi Ike (池 毅) (composer of "Makafushigi Adventure!", opening theme song of the Dragon Ball anime) also participate in music production.

From 2004, for many years promotional marketing for the series featured the pairing of comedian Tomonori Jinnai and gravure idol/tarento Chinatsu Wakatsuki.

In June 2015, creator Akira Sakuma stated "I'm announcing here that Momotarō Dentetsu is officially done. Ishikawa at Konami squelched everything." However, in July 2015, Konami lends the license to Nintendo for an unspecified amount of money.

After seven years with no releases, a new version of the game was released, exclusive to the Nintendo 3DS. Momotarō Dentetsu II released in the US on the TurboGrafx-16 Mini.

== Titles ==
=== Console games ===
Its console games are as follows:

1. Momotarō Dentetsu (桃太郎電鉄) (Famicom: 1988-12-02)
2. Super Momotarō Dentetsu (スーパー桃太郎電鉄) (PC Engine: 1989-09-15, Game Boy: 1991-03-08, Famicom: 1992-03-20)
3. Super Momotarō Dentetsu II (スーパー桃太郎電鉄II) (PC Engine: 1991-12-20, Super Famicom: 1992-08-07, Game Boy: 1994-02-18)
4. Super Momotarō Dentetsu III (スーパー桃太郎電鉄III) (Super Famicom: 1994-12-09)
  - Super Momotarō Dentetsu 3 (スーパー桃太郎電鉄3) (Game Gear: 1995-12-15)
5. Super Momotarō Dentetsu DX (スーパー桃太郎電鉄DX) (Super Famicom: 1995-12-08)
6. Momotarō Dentetsu HAPPY (桃太郎電鉄HAPPY) (Super Famicom: 1996-12-06)
7. Momotarō Dentetsu 7 (桃太郎電鉄7) (PlayStation: 1997-12-23)
8. Momotarō Dentetsu jr.: Zenkoku Ramen Meguri no Maki (桃太郎電鉄jr. 〜全国ラーメンめぐりの巻〜) (Game Boy: 1998-07-31)
9. Momotarō Dentetsu V (桃太郎電鉄V) (PlayStation: 1999-12-16)
10. Momotarō Dentetsu X: Kyushu Version (桃太郎電鉄X 〜九州編もあるばい〜) (PlayStation 2: 2001-12-13)
11. Momotarō Dentetsu 11: Black Bombee Shutsugen! No Maki (桃太郎電鉄11 ブラックボンビー出現!の巻) (PlayStation 2 & GameCube: 2002-12-05)
12. Momotarō Dentetsu 12: Nishinihon Hen mo ari Masse! (桃太郎電鉄12 西日本編もありまっせー!) (PlayStation 2 & GameCube: 2003-12-11)
13. Momotarō Dentetsu USA (桃太郎電鉄USA) - (PlayStation 2: 2004-11-18)
14. Momotarō Dentetsu G: Make a Gold Deck! (桃太郎電鉄G 〜ゴールド・デッキを作れ!) (Game Boy Advance: 2005-06-30)
15. Momotarō Dentetsu 15: Godai Bombi Toujou! No Maki (桃太郎電鉄15 〜五大ボンビー登場!の巻) (PlayStation 2: 2005-12-08)
16. Momotarō Dentetsu 16: Moving in Hokkaido! (桃太郎電鉄16 〜北海道大移動の巻!) (PlayStation 2: 2006-12-07, Wii: 2007-07-19)
  - Momotarō Dentetsu 16 GOLD (桃太郎電鉄16 GOLD) (Xbox 360: 2007-12-06)
17. Momotarō Dentetsu DS: TOKYO & JAPAN (桃太郎電鉄DS 〜TOKYO&JAPAN) (Nintendo DS: 2007-04-26)
18. Momotarō Dentetsu 20th Anniversary (桃太郎電鉄20周年) (Nintendo DS: 2008-12-18)
19. Momotarō Dentetsu 2010: Sengoku Ishin no Hero Daishūgō! No Maki (桃太郎電鉄2010 〜戦国・維新のヒーロー大集合!の巻) (Wii: 2009-11-26)
20. Momotarō Dentetsu Tag Match: Yūjō Doryoku Shōri No Maki (桃太郎電鉄タッグマッチ 友情・努力・勝利の巻!) (PlayStation Portable: 2010-07-15)
21. Momotarō Dentetsu World (桃太郎電鉄WORLD) (Nintendo DS:2010-12-02)
22. Momotarō Dentetsu 2017: Tachiagare Nippon!! (桃太郎電鉄2017 たちあがれ日本!!) (Nintendo 3DS: 2016-12-22)
23. Momotarō Dentetsu: Showa, Heisei, Reiwa Mo Teiban! (桃太郎電鉄 〜昭和 平成 令和も定番!〜) (Nintendo Switch: 2020-11-19)
24. Momotarō Dentetsu World: Chikyuu wa Kibou de Mawatteru! (桃太郎電鉄ワールド 〜地球は希望でまわってる!〜) (Nintendo Switch: 2023-11-16)
25. Momotarō Dentetsu 2: Anata no Machi Mokittoaru (桃太郎電鉄2 ～あなたの町も きっとある～) (Nintendo Switch: 2025-11-13)
  - Momotarō Dentetsu 2: Anata no Machi Mokittoaru Nintendo Switch 2 Edition (桃太郎電鉄2 ～あなたの町も きっとある～ Nintendo Switch 2 Edition) (Nintendo Switch 2: 2025-11-13)

=== Feature phone games ===
- Momotarō Dentetsu TOKYO (桃太郎電鉄TOKYO) (i-mode: 2005-02-07, EZweb: 2006-01-26, Yahoo! Keitai (Yahoo!ケータイ): 2007-04-02)
- Momotarō Dentetsu JAPAN (桃太郎電鉄JAPAN) (i-mode: 2005-11-01, EZweb: 2006-08-10, Yahoo! Keitai: 2007-04-02)
  - Momotarō Dentetsu JAPAN Deluxe (桃太郎電鉄JAPAN 豪華版) (i-mode: 2007-01-04, EZweb: 2008-04-03)
- Momotarō Dentetsu WORLD (桃太郎電鉄WORLD) (i-mode: 2006-04-01, EZweb: 2007-02-01, Yahoo! Keitai: 2007-09-03)
  - Momotarō Dentetsu WORLD Deluxe (桃太郎電鉄WORLD 豪華版) (i-mode: 2007-07-01)
  - Momotarō Dentetsu WORLD Remote Play (桃太郎電鉄WORLD 遠距離対戦版) (i-mode: 2009-08-03)
- Momotarō Dentetsu CHUBU (桃太郎電鉄CHUBU) (i-mode: 2006-11-01, Yahoo! Keitai: 2007-09-03, EZweb: 2007-09-06)
- Momotarō Dentetsu KANTO (桃太郎電鉄KANTO) (i-mode: 2007-05-01, EZweb: 2008-01-31, Yahoo! Keitai: 2008-02-01)
- Momotarō Dentetsu TOHOKU (桃太郎電鉄TOHOKU) (i-mode: 2007-11-01, Yahoo! Keitai: 2008-09-01, EZweb: 2008-09-04)
  - Momotarō Dentetsu TOHOKU Deluxe (桃太郎電鉄TOHOKU 豪華版) (i-mode: 2008-01-04)
- Momotarō Dentetsu HOKKAIDO (桃太郎電鉄HOKKAIDO) (i-mode: 2008-06-01, Yahoo! Keitai: 2009-02-02, EZweb: 2009-02-12)
- Momotarō Dentetsu KYUSHU (桃太郎電鉄KYUSHU) (i-mode: 2009-02-01)
- Momotarō Dentetsu SETOUCHI (桃太郎電鉄SETOUCHI) (i-mode: 2009-09-01)
- Momotarō Dentetsu KINKI (桃太郎電鉄KINKI) (i-mode: 2010-03-01)
- Momotarō Dentetsu AOMORI (桃太郎電鉄AOMORI) (i-mode:2010-11-01)
- Momotarō Dentetsu SHIZUOKA (桃太郎電鉄SHIZUOKA) (i-mode:2011-05-01)
- Momotarō Dentetsu TOKAI (桃太郎電鉄TOKAI) (i-mode:2012-02-01)

=== iOS games ===
- Momotarō Dentetsu JAPAN+ (桃太郎電鉄 JAPAN+) (iPhone/iPod touch: 2011-02-17)

=== Entertainment games ===
- Momotarō Dentetsu Medal Game mo Teiban! (桃太郎電鉄 ～メダルゲームも定番！～) (Medal game:2023-03-22)
- Momotarō Dentetsu: Pachisuro Teiban! (桃太郎電鉄〜パチスロも定番!〜) (Slot machine:2024-12-01)
- Momotarō Dentetsu 2: Anata no Machi no Medal Game (桃太郎電鉄２ ～あなたの町のメダルゲーム～) (Medal game:TBA)

== Sales and popularity ==
The series is popular in Japan. Momotarō Dentetsu 7 sold over 500,000 copies in Japan. Total shipments exceeded 12 million units by 2011. To commemorate the 20th anniversary of the series, Hudson collaborated with the financially troubled Chōshi Electric Railway Line, operating a train on the railway decorated with a Momotarō Dentetsu motif. Opening on April 25, 2007, the train ran until its third anniversary. In June 2009, two Momotetsu-themed restaurants opened at Japanese railway stations: one at Haijima Station, and another at Kaminagaya Station.
