= Momotarō Dentetsu (video game) =

- Publisher: Hudson Soft
- Series: Momotarō Dentetsu
- Platform: Family Computer
- Release: JP: 2 December 1988
- Genre: Board game

Momotarō Dentetsu (Note: Japanese: 桃太郎電鉄; lit. Momotaro Electric Railway) is a board game-themed video game published by Hudson Soft for the Family Computer on December 2, 1988. The game has players control trains as they travel through Japan. The player can buy properties, with the winner being the player with the highest value in properties owned at the end of the game.

The game was conceived as a parody of the role-playing game Momotarō Densetsu from the same development team. Reviews in Marukatsu Famicom found the game enjoyable for all audiences, but said players who sought out more strategic gameplay may find themselves disappointed. The series had a sequel in Japan and spawned a series that continued into the 2020s.

== Gameplay ==
The general gameplay of Momotarō Dentetsu consists of travelling around Japan via train, buying properties and the player with the highest total assets at the end being declared the winner.

== Development ==
Momotarō Dentetsu was conceived as a parody of role-playing game (RPG) Momotarō Densetsu. Both games shared the same staff, including Akira Sakuma and Takayuki Doi.

Shoji Masuda was credited as the "script assistant" for the game, which led to Masuda joking that the game did not even have a script. Masuda wrote the AI routines for the enemy company presidents and recalled that he had prepared only one type of routine.

Shoji said that Sakuma oversaw everything when creating Momotarō Dentetsu. The developers noted they enjoyed the theme of a game released earlier, a train-oriented video game titled Tetsudōō (Note: 鉄道王; lit. Railway King) (1987) but found some gameplay elements weak and wanted to enhance it for Momotarō Dentetsu. Initially, the game was developed by drawing a grid on a large sheet of paper with a marker as a board game. The developers played it by rolling dice and made revisions to it nearly every day for months. At first, there were no properties to purchase.

== Reception and legacy ==
Reception

Review scores
| Publication | Score |
|---|---|
| Famitsu | 5/10, 6/10, 7/10, 8/10 |
| Marukatsu Famicom | 6/10, 7/10, 8/10, 7/10, 8/10 |

Momotarō Dentetsu was released in Japan by Hudson Soft for the Family Computer on December 2, 1988.

In the magazine Marukatsu Famicom, the five reviewers generally complimented the game as being a fun game for all audiences. While one reviewer complimented how it captured the fun of actual board games, another also praised its graphics as being simple but very polished. Other reviewers found the game lacking depth, with one noting the more carefully you try to play and strategize, the more dissatisfied they would be with the game. One reviewer found it monotonous as its unique mechanics, such as the train system, were not fully utilized. Reviewers Famitsu made similar comments, whil saying the humor and graphics were good, the game ultimately was lacking in terms of strategic thinking and the thrill of how the dice will roll will play out in other board games.

Sakuma said that after watching audiences play the Momotarō Dentetsu they found everyone aiming to purchase an expensive property in the game. The developers did not intend this to be a strategy. They changed some gameplay in the second game so that each player had the same destination. The next game in the series was Sūpā Momotarō Dentetsu (Note: スーパー桃太郎電鉄; lit. Super Momotaro Electric Railway) for the PC Engine.

The basic gameplay of travelling via train in a board game setting to reach a set destination was established with Momotarō Dentetsu. The Momotarō Dentetsu game series has continued into the 2020s with the release of Momotarō Dentetsu 2: Anata no Machi mo Kitto Aru (Note: 桃太郎電鉄2 〜あなたの町も きっとある〜; lit. Momotaro Electric Railway 2: Your Town Is Sure to Be There Too) in 2025. No games in the Momotarō Dentetsu series have been released in the United States, except Super Momotarō Dentetsu II which was still released without a translation to English.

== See also ==
- List of Nintendo Entertainment System games
- Video games in Japan
