= Binbōgami =

Japanese kami (god or spirit) of poverty

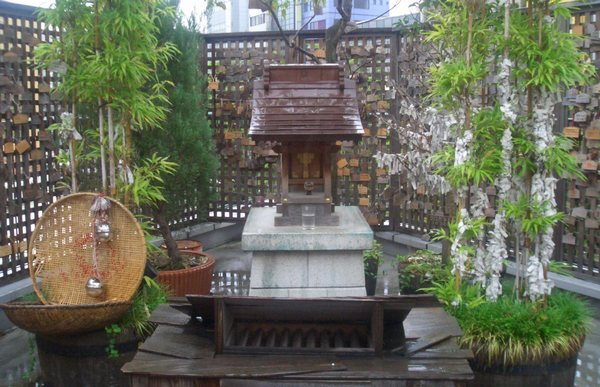
Binbōgami shrine (Binbōgami Jinja), Kōtō, Tokyo, Japan

A binbōgami (貧乏神; lit. "kami of poverty") is a kami (god or spirit) in Japanese folklore said to inhabit a person or their house, bringing poverty and misery. References to binbōgami appear in classic Japanese tales, essays, and rakugo performances.

== Description ==
A binbōgami typically appears as a skinny, dirty old man with a pale complexion, often carrying a paper fan (shibu-uchiwa) and wearing a sad expression. Regardless of appearance, they are said to be fond of lazy people. When inhabiting a house, they reportedly prefer to live in closets. According to the poet Nakamura Kōgyō, binbōgami have a fondness for miso, and use their fans to waft and enjoy its aroma. Some descriptions add details like wielding a kendama and wearing only one broken geta.

Being a kami, a binbōgami cannot be killed, but methods to drive one away exist.

== Folklore and Literature ==
=== Historical References ===
- The personification of poverty appears as early as the 13th-century collection Shasekishū (Collection of Sand and Pebbles), Vol. 8, Tale 14 ("Driving Out Poverty"). Here, the entity is called "Hinkyū-den" (貧窮殿, Lord Poverty). The story describes a 50-year-old monk named Enjōbō from Owari Province who, along with his disciples on the last day of the month, chased Hinkyū-den out of his residence by striking with peach branches while chanting incantations, finally shutting the gate behind it.
- The term "binbōgami" itself dates back at least to the Muromachi period. Records from Kyoto, devastated by the Ōnin War, mention a rumor from June 1481 (Bunmei 13): "The wives of the Fukugami (Gods of Fortune) from Sakai have entered the capital (Kyoto), and the husbands, the Binbōgami of Kyoto, have gone down to Sakai." This reflects the townspeople's desperate hope for Kyoto's recovery. This account also portrays binbōgami as male deities.
- The term appears in renga (linked verse) in Moretake Senku by Arakida Moritake, composed around 1540 (Tenbun 9).

=== Edo Period Tales ===
- (Toen Shōsetsu, Tales from the Rabbit Garden, 1825) by Kyokutei Bakin and others, features a "Kyūki" (窮鬼, Poverty Demon):

In 1821, in the Banchō area of Edo, a samurai household suffered constant misfortune. A servant of this household, travelling to Sōka, met a Buddhist priest who claimed he had just come from the servant's master's house. The servant, having never seen the priest there, was told: "Illness constantly breaks out in that house; it is all my doing, for I am the Binbōgami. But that house has reached the depths of poverty, so I am moving elsewhere. Your master's fortunes will improve from now on." The priest then vanished. As foretold, the household's fortunes gradually improved.

- Tsumura Soan's essay collection Tankai (譚海, Sea of Tales, c. 1795):

A man, napping at home, dreamt of a ragged old man entering his room. From then on, nothing he did succeeded. Four years later, the old man reappeared in a dream, announcing his departure. He instructed the man on the ritual to send off a binbōgami: "Prepare a little baked rice and baked miso, place them on an oshiki (a square wooden tray), carry it out the back door, and release it into a river." He also advised how to prevent the binbōgami's return: "Binbōgami love miso, so never prepare baked miso. Eating raw miso is even worse, as it signifies poverty so severe one cannot even afford the fire to bake miso." The man followed the instructions and his household never faced destitution again.

- Ihara Saikaku's Nippon Eidaigura (日本永代蔵, The Eternal Storehouse of Japan, 1688), includes the story "Inoru shirushi no kami no oshiki" (祈る印の神の折敷, The Oshiki Tray as a Sign of Prayer):

A man who revered the generally disliked binbōgami was visited at his bedside on the night of Jinjitsu (the 7th day of the first lunar month) by the binbōgami itself. The god was deeply moved, saying, "This is the first time I've ever eaten at a proper table setting." In gratitude, the binbōgami made the man wealthy. Another tale recounts a perpetually poor hatamoto (a direct vassal of the shogun) in Edo's Koishikawa district. On New Year's Eve, reasoning that his lack of major misfortune despite constant poverty must be due to the binbōgami's protection, he offered sake, rice, and other items to the god, asking it to alleviate his poverty somewhat and share some fortune. Thereafter, his situation reportedly improved slightly.

== Beliefs and Practices ==
- Driving Away:
- In Niigata Prefecture, lighting a fire in the irori (sunken hearth) on Ōmisoka (New Year's Eve) is said to drive away the binbōgami due to the heat. Conversely, the warmth is said to attract the Fukugami (gods of good fortune).
- Several superstitions connect binbōgami to the irori. In Tsushima, Ehime (now part of Uwajima), excessively poking the irori fire is said to summon a binbōgami.
- The Senba ritual in Osaka involved using the smell of baked miso to lure binbōgami out of houses and into a folded miso plate, which was then discarded in a river. Those performing the ritual washed thoroughly afterward to avoid bringing the god back.
- Transformation: Hospitality towards a binbōgami might transform it into a fukugami, as suggested in Nippon Eidaigura.
- Proverb: The saying "柿団扇は貧乏神がつく" (Kaki uchiwa wa binbōgami ga tsuku - "A persimmon-wood fan attracts the binbōgami") derives from the belief that binbōgami are attached to these types of fans.

== Modern Shrines and Representations ==
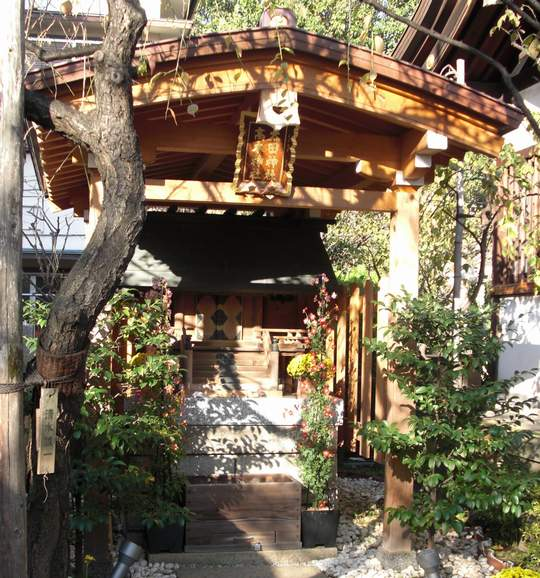
Ōta Shrine (within Ushi-Tenjin Kitano Shrine grounds), Bunkyō, Tokyo

- The binbōgami from Nippon Eidaigura, capable of turning poverty into fortune, is enshrined at the Ōta Shrine, located within the grounds of the Ushi-Tenjin Kitano Shrine in Kasuga, Bunkyō, Tokyo. It is believed that by praying at the shrine, temporarily welcoming the binbōgami into one's home, and then respectfully sending it off after 21 days of veneration, one can sever ties with poverty.
- Myōsen-ji Temple in Taitō, Tokyo, enshrines a stone statue of a binbōgami. This statue is specifically modeled after the popular Binbōgami (King Bomby) character (Note: From the Momotaro Densetsu and Momotaro Dentetsu game series.) designed by Takayuki Doi for the Hudson Soft game series Momotaro. (Note: Both Momotaro Densetsu and Momotaro Dentetsu series.) The statue is named "貧乏が去る（猿）像" (Binbō ga Saru Zō), a pun meaning "Statue of Poverty Leaving," as saru means both "to leave" and "monkey". Consequently, the statue features a monkey riding on the binbōgami's head.
- Similar "Binbō ga Saru Zō" statues based on the same game character have also been installed at Kino Station in Kagawa, Sasebo Station in Nagasaki, and Nakanomachi Station on the Choshi Electric Railway. The Choshi Electric Railway also features related statues: one at Kasagami-Kurohae Station with a pheasant (kiji) on its head, punning on "貧乏を取り（鳥）" (binbō o tori, Poverty Taking/Bird), and another at Inuboh Station with a dog (inu) on its head, punning on "貧乏が去ぬ（犬）" (binbō ga inu, Poverty Leaving/Dog).

== See also ==
- List of Japanese deities
- List of legendary creatures from Japan
- Seven Lucky Gods (counterparts associated with fortune)
- Good Luck Girl! (manga series featuring a Binbōgami as a character)

== Bibliography ==
- Endō, Norikatsu; Ōtsuka, Mitsuko (30 November 1989). クリスマス小事典 [Christmas Encyclopedia]. Gendai Kyōyō Bunko (in Japanese). Shakai Shisōsha. ISBN 978-4-390-11317-5.
- Hirai, Kazumi (20 June 2015). ブーケとリース [Bouquets and Wreaths] (in Japanese). Shufunotomo. ISBN 978-4-07-296785-0.
- Morris, Desmond (20 November 1994) [19 November 1992]. クリスマス・ウォッチング [Christmas Watching] (in Japanese). Yashiro Michiko (trans.). Fusōsha. ISBN 978-4-594-01578-7.
- Arai, Naoyuki, ed. (25 November 2013). 絵でつづるやさしい暮らし歳時記 暦でみる日本のしきたりと年中行事 [Illustrated Gentle Life Almanac: Japanese Customs and Annual Events Seen Through the Calendar] (in Japanese). Nihon Bungeisha. ISBN 978-4-537-21154-2.
- Kurismasu Omoshiro Jiten Kankō Iinkai hen, ed. (25 October 2003). クリスマスおもしろ事典 [Interesting Christmas Encyclopedia] (in Japanese). Nihon Kirisuto Kyōdan Shuppankyoku. ISBN 978-4-8184-0508-0.
- Nihonsha hen, ed. (20 August 1996) [June 1981]. つい誰かに話したくなる雑学の本 [The Book of Trivia You Can't Help Telling Someone]. Kodansha +α Bunko (in Japanese). Kodansha. ISBN 978-4-06-256156-3.
