= Sugoro Quest: Dice Heroes =

1991 video game

- English promo art for 2025 re-release
- Developer: Technōs Japan
- Publisher: Technōs Japan
- Platform: Family Computer
- Release: JP: June 28, 1991
- Genres: Role-playing game, board game
- Mode: Single-player

Sugoro Quest: Dice Heroes (Note: Japanese: すごろクエスト ダイスの戦士たち, Hepburn: Su Goro Kuesuto Daisu No Senshitachi; lit. 'Sugoro Quest: Warriors of the Dice') is a 1991 role-playing video game developed and published by Technōs Japan for the Family Computer. It was released on June 28, 1991 in Japan. In the game, four heroes set out to free a land that has been invaded by monsters. The game was released was re-released digitally for various Nintendo consoles and handhelds in Japan, it received an English-language for the Western market on February 7, 2025, for the Nintendo Switch, PlayStation 4, PlayStation 5, Xbox One, and Xbox Series X and Series S.

The gameplay in Sugoro Quest: Dice Heroes is based around role-playing video game mechanics such as turn-based battles involving using items, battling and magic, as well as talking with non-player characters, and player characters using characters with different strengths and weaknesses. The game is based on the Japanese board game sugoroku. Gameplay involves movement across the board, and the in-game battles are all controlled by rolling an in-game dice.

Reviewers in Famicom Tsūshin complimented Sugoro Quest: Dice Heroes's comic nature and straightforward dice-based game design, while Digitally Downloaded reviewing the English re-release found it both fun and frustrating due to the luck-based nature of gameplay.

== Plot and gameplay ==
Sugoro Quest: Dice Heroes takes place in a world where monsters are wreaking havoc on a once peaceful land. To restore order from the beasts, the king sends out four warriors to travel through the land to vanquish the invading monsters.

Zoey Handley of Destructoid described Sugoro Quest: Dice Heroes as a hybrid of a board game and a Japanese Role-playing game (J-RPG). The player can choose one of four characters, each possessing their own unique strengths and weaknesses. The game has six stages. Each of these areas is a series of segmented paths that you roll a dice to determine movement. Different areas on the board trigger a variety of events. These range from town or castle tiles that can start an event for that on the board. Human-shaped tiles trigger a conversation with a Non-player character (NPC). Landing on a sword, armor or shield tile will strengthen the player's current setup. spring tiles will restore your health and magic while skull tiles decrease the player's health.

Landing on a blank space begins a battle. The in-game battles have the player throw dice again to see which character, with whoever gets the highest number, can attack. In battles, the player has the options to either attack, cast magic spells, use items, flee from the battle, or summon a Diceman. Using an item does not require a dice roll. Fleeing from a battle will have the player roll the dice and move backwards on the board based on the number they have on their dice.

Gaining enough experience point, the player has higher numbers on their dice for battle.

== Development ==
Sugoro Quest: Dice Heroes was developed by Technōs Japan. The company was mostly known for their Double Dragon and Kunio-Kun video game series.

The gameplay is based on sugoroku, a Japanese board game played with dice. Technōs Japan's version applies a role-playing motif, giving it a title a play on words with "Sugoroku" and "quest".

== Release and sequels ==
Sugoro Quest: Dice Heroes was released for the Family Computer on June 28, 1991. The game was released exclusively in Japan, where it also received digital re-releases on the Wii, Nintendo 3DS, and Wii U Virtual Consoles. It received as Sugoro Quest: Dice Heroes official translation into English and was released in the West on February 7, 2025, for the Nintendo Switch, PlayStation 4, PlayStation 5, Xbox One, and Xbox Series X and Series S. This version of the game added new features to the original release, such as save states, visual filters, cheats, and the ability to change the graphics and music.

The game had a sequels for the Super Famicom titled Sugoro Quest++: Dicenics (1994) and the Wii with Sugoro Chronicle: Migite ni Ken o Hidarite ni Saikoro o (2008). Sugoro Quest: Dice Heroes would later receive a fan translation.

== Reception ==
Reception

Review scores
Publication	Score
Digitally Downloaded	3.5/5
Famicom Tsūshin	7/10, 7/10, 8/10, 7/10

On release, the original game was reviewed by four critics in Japanese magazine Famicom Tsūshin. The reviewers commented on the random-nature of dice gameplay, with three mentioning it may sound frustrating, it led to more straightforward gameplay that was easy to understand, and fit the comical light nature of the game. While two of its reviewers complimented its graphics and comical tone, they wished there were more varied gameplay elements to Sugoro Quest: Dice Heroes.

Reviewing the game for its 2025 re-release, Digitally Downloaded it could be fun despite being "frustrating and unfair" as everything was based on lucky rolls of the dice.

== See also ==
- History of Eastern role-playing video games
  - List of role-playing video games: 1990 to 1991
