= Gowappa 5 Gōdam =

Japanese anime television series

- ゴワッパー5ゴーダム
- Genre: Mecha
- Created by: Tatsunoko Production Planning Office
- Directed by: Hisayuki Toriumi
- Music by: Bob Sakuma
- Opening theme: "Ikuzo Godam!" by Ichirou Mizuki
- Ending theme: "Godam 5 no uta" by Ichirou Mizuki
- Country of origin: Japan
- Original language: Japanese
- No. of episodes: 36

Production
- Producers: Takehiko Goto (NET); Masashi Nagai
- Editors: Hajime Taniguchi; Tomoko Kida; Yoko Tsuru
- Production companies: Asahi Broadcasting Corporation (episodes 1–24); NET (episodes 25–36); Tatsunoko Production

Original release
- Network: ANN (ABC, NET)
- Release: April 4 – December 29, 1976

Go-wapper 5 Go-dam (ゴワッパー5ゴーダム, Gowappā Faibu Gōdamu) is a Japanese mecha anime series produced by Tatsunoko Production and aired in 1976. There were 36 episodes. It is the second installment to Takara's Magne-Robo franchise.

== Outline ==
Gowappa was the first super robot anime to feature a female as the leader and main character. The concept of a group of young adults gathering to fight evil can be seen in other Tatsunoko works such as Science Ninja Team Gatchaman and in manga written by Tatsuo Yoshida and Ippei Kuri, but as of 2008, the only other Tatsunoko production featuring a female lead is Time Bokan 2000: Kaitou Kiramekiman. Gowappa 5 Gordam has a bright theme song and light-hearted situations, but the story also includes more serious parts, and there are episodes that end on a rather bitter note.

Because Gowappa 5 Gordam was competing with another robot anime, UFO Robo Grendizer (on Fuji Television), as well as a popular television game show called Up Down Quiz (on Mainichi Broadcasting System), both in the same timeslot, it faced an extremely difficult ratings battle, and was later moved mid-broadcast from Sunday's "Golden Hour" to a weekday evening timeslot, where its ratings suffered. After moving, Tatsunoko attempted to broaden the scope of the series by making Gordam itself into a combining robot, but this did not bring viewers back, so it ended after three seasons (36 episodes). Before and since this series, there have been many Tatsunoko-made series broadcast on the same channels that had to fight for ratings in the same manner.

"Gowappa", the name of the group of five main characters, is an abbreviation created from two of the kanji in the phrase "five children" (五人の小童, gonin no kowappa) to create 五童 (gowappa). However, one of the candidates for the series' name was "Abaranger", and many media outlets actually used this name before the series aired. The Abaranger name would go on to be a candidate name for the later series Golden Warrior Gold Lightan, and would finally be used for the 2003 Super Sentai series Bakuryu Sentai Abaranger.

There is a mistake in the opening animation sequence where Gordam fires its missiles and its other weapon, the Bocunder, hits the enemies instead; Gordam then fires the Bocunder and the missiles explode.

== Story ==
Five youths from Edo City explore a strange rocky island and discover the mecha that Doctor Hoarai had been creating in order to resist the impending attack by a race of subterranean rock people. Doctor Hoarai was ridiculed by the scientific community for his predictions that such an attack would take place. The youths decide to join the doctor (who was dead but had transferred his mind into a computer) in piloting the vehicles and protecting Earth. The Gowapper 5 Godam team is born. With the aid of the giant fighting robot Godam, the Gowapper team under the leadership of Yoko Misaki must face the hordes of the inhuman subterranean people.

== Staff ==
- Planning: Jinzo Toriumi, Akiyoshi Sakai
- Original work: Tatsuo Yoshida, Tatsunoko Productions Planning Room
- Magazine serialization: Tanoshii Youchien, Otomodachi, Bouken'oh
- Director: Hisayuki Toriumi
- Character design: Yoshitaka Amano
- Mechanical design: Kunio Okawara
- Art direction: Mitsuyoshi Kozugi, Tsuneo Nonomiya
- Recording director: Kan Mizumoto
- Editing: Hajime Taniguchi, Tomoko Kita, Yoko Nidome
- Music: Bob Sakuma
- Producers: Masatsuku Nagai, Takehiko Goto
- Production collaboration: Sunrise
- Production: Tatsunoko Pro, ABC TV (first part), Japan Educational TV (NET TV, now TV Asahi) (latter part)

== Characters ==
Japanese name	Vehicle	Voiced by
Yoko Misaki	A-Plane	Terumi Niki
Go Tsunami	Gasomashin	Yoshito Yasuhara
Godaemon	Heli-Marine	Kaneta Kimotsuki
Norisuke	Yadokari Jeep	Sachiko Chijimatsu
Daikichi Kameyama	Turtle Tank	Kiyoshi Komiyama
Doctor Hoarai		Iemasa Kayumi
Jo		
Maguda Shogun		
Sentaro Shima		Kazuyuki Sogabe

== Media ==
=== Music ===
- Opening theme song: "Ikuzo! Gordam" (行くぞ! ゴーダム)
  - Sung by: Ichiro Mizuki, Young Fresh
  - Composition: Asei Kobayashi
  - Lyrics: Ichiro Wakabayashi
  - Arrangement: Nozomi Aoki
- Ending theme song: "Song of Gowapper 5" (ゴワッパー5の歌)
  - Sung by: Ichiro Mizuki, Young Fresh
  - Composition: Asei Kobayashi
  - Lyrics: Ichiro Wakabayashi
  - Arrangement: Nozomi Aoki

=== Laserdisc ===
In 1995, the entire series was released as a Laserdisc box set.

=== DVD ===
Nippon Columbia released the DVD boxset in 2005.

== Merchandise ==
The Gowappa 5 Gordam characters and mecha were released in Takara's Magnemo toy line in Japan in 1976. From its first incarnation, Gordam could both combine and transform, like in the show.

The Magnemo line was included in "Magnerobo" series by Takara Tomy. Included in this series are Steel Jeeg, Magne Robo Gakeen, Chojin Sentai Barattack, and Machine Zaurer.
