= Asei Kobayashi =

Japanese composer (1932–2021)

Asei Kobayashi 小林 亜星
- Born: 11 August 1932; Shibuya, Tokyo, Japan
- Died: 30 May 2021 (aged 88) Tokyo, Japan
- Genres: Anime; film score
- Occupations: Composer; lyricist; actor; tarento
- Website: Official website

Asei Kobayashi (小林 亜星, Kobayashi Asei; 11 August 1932 – 30 May 2021) was a Japanese composer. He was also a lyricist, actor, and multi-tarento. He could also sing songs and advertisement songs.

Kobayashi was represented by Astro Music. He was the director of the Japan Songwriters Association (J-scat). Kobayashi served as the first president of the Dai Nihon Piman-sha Renmei (Dai Pi Ren). His songs are used in advertisements and television themes.

Asei also composed the music for the 1991 Famicom video game Niji no Silkroad. A soundtrack CD was later released titled Rainbow Silkroad Image Album WINDY ROAD.

He also composed The TV Asahi song in 1977 when the television station changed its name to its current name.

== Filmography ==
=== Anime ===
List of production work in anime
Year	Title	Crew role	Notes	Source
1963–65	Wolf Boy Ken	Music, OP/ED composition		
1965–66	Hustle Punch	Music, OP/ED composition		
1966–68	Sally the Witch	ED3 composition		
1967	The King Kong Show	Music, OP composition		
1969	Himitsu no Akko-chan	ED composition		
1970–71	Kick no Oni	Music, ED composition		
1972–74	Gatchaman	ED1/OE2 composition		
1972–73	Hazedon	OP2/ED2 composition		
1973–74	Dororon Enma-kun	ED composition		
1975	Tekkaman: The Space Knight	ED composition		
1976	Gowappa 5 Gōdam	ED composition		
1976–77	Chōdenji Robo Combattler V	ED composition		
1980–82	Kaibutsu-kun	Music	2nd TV series	
1982	Asari-chan Ai no Marchen Shōjo	ED composition	Film	
2002	Minna no Uta	Song	Ep. "Buta ma n-gokoro" ぶたまんごころ	
2003	ja:もも子、かえるの歌がきこえるよ	IS1 composition		

List of voice work in anime
Year	Title	Voice role	Notes	Source
1983	Noel's Fantastic Trip	Sunday	Film	
1985	A Journey Through Fairyland	Teacher	Film	

== See also ==
- Hideki Saijo
- Kirin Kiki
- MoJo
- Kuniko Mukōda
