= Niji no Silkroad =

1991 video game

- Cover art
- Developer: Advance Communication Company
- Publisher: Victor Musical Industries
- Designer: Kazuo Enomoto
- Composers: Asei Kobayashi; Ryoko Kihara (Arranger); Shigeo Kihara (Director); Osamu Kasai (Sound Programming); Masaaki Harada (Sound Programming); Michiharu Hasuya (Sound Programming)
- Platform: Family Computer
- Release: JP: February 22, 1991
- Genre: Role-playing video game
- Mode: Single-player

Niji no Silk Road (虹のシルクロード; "Rainbow Silk Road") is a role-playing video game for the Family Computer. It was developed by Advance Communication Company and published by Victor Musical Industries in 1991. The game was only released in Japan.

== Gameplay ==
The game features a top-down perspective when exploring outside of battle.

The game differs from other games in the genre by placing high importance on the player's ability to buy and sell items to make money. Niji no Silk Road features turn-based, first-person combat, but enemies do not drop money or experience points. License points are earned after battles that grants the prince the ability to sell more goods in different places. The player moves the prince through towns and on the world map across the Silk Road, where enemies can attack. The world map features different types of terrain, including deserts that deplete the prince's water supply, which will kill him if fully depleted.

Goods, such as clayware, can be purchased in a town and then sold in a town where the good is more valued. The player can purchase animals to increase the number of goods they can carry and they can hire soldiers to aid the prince in battle.

== Plot ==
The player controls the main protagonist, an exiled prince of LittleLand that has been recently informed of his royal heritage. To reclaim the throne, the prince must collect seven shards of the Rainbow Mirror and defeat the usurper, Zrool. The shards are scattered throughout the regions of Arabia, Persia, Mongolia, India, Cham, China, and Japan, and the prince must trade goods to make his way to each region. Once the mirror is collected, the prince shines it at Zrool and exposes the imposter. The prince then takes his throne as the new king.

== Music ==
The game's music was composed by famed Japanese composer Asei Kobayashi. The music mostly consists of middle-eastern themes (using the Hungarian minor scale). The music was arranged for the Famicom by Ryoko Kihara, and was directed by Shigeo Kihara of Astro Music. The two had previously worked on the Famicom title Momotarō Densetsu. While the sound was outsourced, the sound driver and effects were done by the developer, Advance Communication Company.

A soundtrack CD for the game was released titled "Rainbow Silk Road Image Album WINDY ROAD." It contains the in-game music, with the addition of a few arrangements.

== Release and reception ==
Reception

Review score
Publication	Score
Famitsu	6/10, 6/10, 7/10, 5/10

Niji no Silkroad was released for the Family Computer in Japan on February 22, 1991.
