= Kazuyuki Sekiguchi =

Japanese musician, member of Southern all stars (1955-)

- 関口 和之
- Born: December 21, 1955 (age 70); Agano, Niigata, Japan
- Education: Aoyama Gakuin University
- Occupations: Musician; singer-songwriter; composer
- Years active: 1974–present
- Musical career
- Genres: Hawaiian pop; rock; blues; folk; video game music; kayōkyoku
- Instruments: Bass guitar, guitar, ukulele
- Label: Victor Entertainment
- Member of: Southern All Stars

Kazuyuki Sekiguchi (関口 和之, Sekiguchi Kazuyuki; born December 21, 1955 in Niigata Prefecture) is a Japanese musician, best known for playing the bass guitar for Southern All Stars. As a solo artist, he has played ukulele. He is a fan of Hawaiian music, and is the founder of the annual Ukulele Picnic music festival in Hawaii. For over thirty years, Sekiguchi has worked with Akira Sakuma in the Momotaro Dentetsu video game series as a music composer.

== Singles ==
=== Kazuyuki Sekiguchi featuring Leyona ===
- HOTEL PACIFIC (2001)

=== Kazuyuki Sekiguchi featuring KONISHIKI ===
- Watashi-no Aozora ~MY BLUE HEAVEN~ (私の青空 ～MY BLUE HEAVEN～ 'My Blue Sky ~MY BLUE HEAVEN~' 2002)

== Original albums ==
- Sakin (砂金 'Gold dust' 1986)
- Ukulele Caravan (2012)
- FREE-UKES (2022)

== Albums ==
=== Captain Mook and The Ala Moana Strings ===
- UKULELE CALENDAR (1997)

Featuring Petty Booka.

=== Kazuyuki Sekiguchi featuring Naoto Takenaka ===
- Kuchibue to Ukulele (口笛とウクレレ 'Whistle and Ukulele' 2000)

=== Kazuyuki Sekiguchi and Sazan All Stars ===
- World Hits!? of Southern All Stars (2001)

=== Kazuyuki Sekiguchi featuring Naoto Takenaka and Kimiko Wakeyama ===
- Kuchibue to Ukulele 2 (口笛とウクレレ2 'Whistle and Ukelele 2' 2008)

== Video games ==
Year	Game	Role
1987	Momotaro Densetsu	Music
1988	Momotaro Dentetsu	Music
1989	Super Momotaro Dentetsu	Music
1990	Momotaro Densetsu II	Music
1991	Super Momotaro Dentetsu II	Music
1991	Momotaro Densetsu Gaiden	Music
1993	Shin Momotaro Densetsu	Music
1994	Super Momotaro Dentetsu III	Music
1995	Super Momotaru Dentetsu DX	Music
1996	Momotaro Dentetsu Happy	Music with Kazuaki Miyaji
1997	Momotaro Dentetsu 7	Music with Kazuaki Miyaji
1998	Momotaro Dentetsu Jr.: Zenkoku Ramen Meguri no Maki	Music with Kazuaki Miyaji
1999	Momotaro Dentetsu V	Music with Kazuaki Miyaji
2001	Momotaro Dentetsu X: Kyushu Version	Music with Kazuaki Miyaji and Takeshi Ike
2002	Momotarō Dentetsu 11: Black Bombee Shutsugen! No Maki	Music with Kazuaki Miyaji and Takeshi Ike
2003	Momotarō Dentetsu 12: Nishinihon Hen mo ari Masse!	Music with Kazuaki Miyaji and Takeshi Ike
2004	Momotaro Dentetsu USA	Music with Kazuaki Miyaji and Takeshi Ike
2005	Momotaro Dentetsu G: Make a Gold Deck!	Music with Kazuaki Miyaji and Takeshi Ike
2005	Momotaro Dentetsu 15: Godai Bombi Toujou! No Maki	Music with Takeshi Ike
2006	Momotaro Dentetsu 16: Moving in Hokkaido!	Music with Takeshi Ike
2007	Momotaro Dentetsu DS: Tokyo & Japan	Music with Takeshi Ike
2008	Momotaro Dentetsu 20th Anniversary	Music with Takeshi Ike
2009	Momotaro Dentetsu 2010: Sengoku Ishin no Hero Daishūgō! No Maki	Music with Takeshi Ike
2010	Momotaro Dentetsu Tag Match: Yūjō Doryoku Shōri No Maki	Music with Takeshi Ike
2010	Momotaro Dentetsu World	Music with Takeshi Ike
2016	Momotaro Dentetsu 2017: Tachiagare Nippon!!	Music with Takeshi Ike
2020	Momotaro Dentetsu: Showa, Heisei, Reiwa Mo Teiban!	Music with Kenichi Maeyamada and Konosuke Kihara
2023	Momotaro Dentetsu World: Chikyuu wa Kibou de Mawatteru!	Music with Kenichi Maeyamada and Konosuke Kihara
