= Good Luck Girl! =

Japanese manga series

- First tankōbon volume cover, featuring Ichiko Sakura (below) and Momiji (above)

貧乏神が! (Binbō-gami ga!)
- Genre: Comedy, supernatural
- Manga
- Written by: Yoshiaki Sukeno
- Published by: Shueisha
- English publisher: Shueisha (digital)
- Imprint: Jump Comics SQ.
- Magazine: Jump Square
- Original run: June 4, 2008 – July 4, 2013
- Volumes: 16
- Anime television series
- Directed by: Tomoyuki Kawamura; Yoichi Fujita
- Written by: Taketo Shimoyama
- Music by: Masashi Hamauzu
- Studio: Sunrise
- Licensed by: Crunchyroll
- Original network: TV Tokyo, TVA, MBS
- Original run: July 5, 2012 – September 27, 2012
- Episodes: 13
- icon

Good Luck Girl!, known in Japan as Binbō-gami ga! (貧乏神が!; lit. 'This God of Poverty!'), is a Japanese manga series written and illustrated by Yoshiaki Sukeno. It was serialized in Shueisha's shōnen manga magazine Jump Square from June 2008 to July 2013, with its chapters collected in sixteen tankōbon volumes. A thirteen-episode anime television series adaptation by Sunrise aired between July and September 2012.

== Plot ==
Ichiko Sakura is a 16-year-old high schooler who has always been pretty lucky throughout her life. This is due to her body possessing an extraordinary amount of Fortune energy, which draws from its surroundings, causing the world to fall out of balance. To rectify this, a Goddess of Misfortune named Momiji is sent to the human world to target Ichiko and steal her Fortune energy in order to rebalance the world.

== Characters ==
=== Main characters ===
Ichiko Sakura (桜 市子, Sakura Ichiko)
Voiced by: Kaori Nazuka (vomic), Kana Hanazawa (anime) (Japanese); Brina Palencia (English)
A 16-year-old high school girl possesses immense Fortune energy, granting her extraordinary beauty, intelligence, wealth, and health. Her excessive Fortune unconsciously drains luck from those around her, leaving them misfortune. While adored by male classmates, she is resented by female peers, her gentle appearance masking a strong-willed nature. A past trauma fuels her fear of closeness, isolating her to avoid betrayal. Using the Somin Shōrai, a magical item from Bobby, she materializes her Fortune energy into stuffed animal-like forms resembling the Chinese zodiac. This energy, when separated from her, can be transferred to others in peril to aid them.
Momiji Binbouda (貧保田 紅葉, Binbōda Momiji)
Voiced by: Yūko Sanpei (vomic), Yumi Uchiyama (anime) (Japanese); Colleen Clinkenbeard (English)
A goddess of misfortune wears a plaid undershirt, red overalls, and one missing shoe. Sent to restore Earth's energy balance, she tries to steal Ichiko's Fortune energy but usually fails. Her misfortune-dense right arm is encased in a cast with built-in gadgets. She can become intangible to bypass barriers. Though constantly battling Ichiko—especially over jokes about her flat chest—she sometimes encourages her to help others. Bathing in the human world temporarily removes her misfortune, lightening her personality until she gets dirty again.

=== Humans ===
Bobby (懋毘威（ボビー）, Bobī)
Voiced by: Yoshihisa Kawahara (Japanese); Patrick Seitz (English)
An African-American monk who travels the world to exterminate evil spirits or gods, though most of the time he comes off as a pervert who chases after large-breasted women. He can sense Ichiko's happiness energy and is able to make Somin Shōrais.
Keita Tsuwabuki (石蕗 恵汰, Tsuwabuki Keita)
Voiced by: Kōki Uchiyama (Japanese); Clifford Chapin (English)
A high school classmate of Ichiko, Keita works multiple part-time jobs to support his four younger siblings, often sleeping through class as a result. Though typically serious and focused on earning money for his family, he was once highly popular with girls—until Nadeshiko's possessiveness secretly prevented others from approaching him. Over time, Ichiko grows romantically interested in him after bonding with his family, while he similarly develops feelings for her. By the series' conclusion, the two are in a relationship.
Ranmaru Rindo (龍胆 嵐丸, Rindō Ranmaru)
Voiced by: Haruka Tomatsu (Japanese); Martha Harms (English)
A transfer student in Ichiko's class, Ranmaru dresses like a male delinquent after being raised by her father to inherit his karate dojo. Though outwardly tough, she secretly wishes to embrace her feminine side and harbors feelings for Keita. After Ichiko saves her life with happiness energy, Ranmaru becomes Ichiko's first genuine friend. She appears to develop romantic interest in Momo'o Inugami, but following his departure, she vows to date any boy who can defeat her in combat.
Nadeshiko Adenokouji (艶光路 撫子, Adenokōji Nadeshiko)
Voiced by: Sayaka Kanda (Japanese); Michelle Lee (English)
Nadeshiko, a petite ninja with a childlike appearance, takes pride in her refined upbringing. Highly skilled in ninjutsu, she secretly rigs Ichiko's home with traps and hiding spots, frustrating both Ichiko and Momiji. Obsessed with Keita since he saved her in childhood, she stalks him relentlessly and uses her self-taught ninja abilities to prevent other girls from approaching him. In the anime adaptation, she appears at each episode's end to highlight her cameo appearances.
Shinobu Daimon (大門 忍, Daimon Shinobu)
Nadeshiko's butler is a lolicon with inappropriate fixations. He actively prevents his master's physical maturation, ensuring her breasts remain undeveloped.
Kikunoshin Suwano (諏訪野 菊之進, Suwano Kikunoshin)
Voiced by: Hiroshi Naka (Japanese); Kent Williams (English)
Ichiko's longtime guardian and former butler, Suwano was the first person she truly cared for. When he nearly dies from the fortune she unknowingly drained from him, Ichiko dismisses him to ensure his safety. He now travels the world with his wife. Though separated, Suwano maintains contact through heartfelt letters that Ichiko carefully preserves in a special box.
Akane Tange (丹下 茜, Tange Akane)
Voiced by: Kozue Harashii (Japanese); Michelle Rojas (English)
A classmate of Ichiko, she shares the other girls' resentment toward her (with Ranmaru being the sole exception). Typically accompanied by two friends, she appears conscious about her looks, styling her long brown hair with side-swept bangs secured by two small hairpins. She develops romantic feelings for Ranmaru Rindou, though her attempts to connect with her frequently lead to humorous misunderstandings.
Misa Kobayashi (小林 魅沙, Kobayashi Misa)
A classmate of Ichiko who shares the general dislike toward her. She stands out due to her large physique and unconventional appearance among the students. Her distinctive look includes dark skin, yellow pigtails adorned with pink flower bands, and simple makeup consisting solely of lipstick and blush. She is frequently shown eating, often seen carrying or consuming onigiri.
Rika Tsuwabuki (石蕗 梨香, Tsuwabuki Rika)
Voiced by: Shiho Kawaragi (Japanese); Tia Ballard (English)
A respectful seventh grader and one of Keita's younger siblings, she values proper manners and expects the same from her brothers. Initially disliking Ichiko for insulting their family, she warms to her after Ichiko saves her brother Ryuuta from drowning.
Ryuuta Tsuwabuki (石蕗 龍汰, Tsuwabuki Ryuuta)
Voiced by: Asami Shimoda (Japanese); Ryan Reynolds (English)
One of Keita's younger brothers, he dreams of playing soccer but cannot join a team due to their family's financial struggles.
Mika Tsuwabuki (石蕗 美香, Tsuwabuki Mika)
Voiced by: Rie Kugimiya (Japanese); Monica Rial (English)
An elementary schooler and one of Keita's younger siblings.
Sorata Tsuwabuki (石蕗 宙汰, Tsuwabuki Sorata)
Voiced by: Chuna (Japanese); Linsay Seidel (English)
The youngest of Keita's siblings, he is a cheerful two-year-old toddler.

=== Gods ===
Kumagai (熊谷)
Momiji's devoted demonic teddy bear companion, Kumagai communicates by writing in a notebook since he cannot speak. His stuffed body stores Momiji's Misfortune items, which she casually extracts as needed. In human form, he appears as a long-haired man with a goatee and ponytail, gaining the ability to speak while retaining the distinctive stitches running down his face from his plush form.
Yamabuki (山吹)
Voiced by: Akane Tomonaga (vomic), Kikuko Inoue (anime) (Japanese); Lydia Mackay (English)
Momiji's superior in the Misfortune God Realm, her towering size distinguishes her. She appears to be a covert admirer of glam rock. Her assistant, Saffron, is an oversized panda-like plush that dwarfs even Teddy.
Momo'o Inugami (犬神 桃央, Inugami Momo'o)
Voiced by: Hiro Shimono (Japanese); Todd Haberkorn (English)
A masochistic canine deity frequently summoned by Momiji, he can transform into a chihuahua with heightened olfactory abilities. Excessive pleasure—whether masochistic or otherwise—forces him back into human form. He eventually trains with Ranmaru, forging a strong friendship rooted in their mutual dedication to protecting Ichiko and Momiji.
Tama (タマ)
Voiced by: Ayaka Mori (Japanese); Becca Shivers (English)
A kitten adopted by Ichiko as part of Momiji's scheme to teach her about loss. When Momiji's plan endangers Tama, Ibuki intervenes with fortune energy but accidentally transforms her into a Maneki-neko deity by using excessive power.
Kuroyuri (黒百合)
Voiced by: Ryoko Shiraishi (Japanese); Morgan Garrett (English)
A fellow Misfortune goddess and Momiji's childhood friend, Kuroyuri arrives in the human world to assume Momiji's duties, hoping to win Yamabuki's affection. Though eager for recognition, she remains loyal to Momiji. Her companion, Gouda, is a frog-like counterpart to Kumagai.
Ibuki (伊吹)
Voiced by: Kōji Yusa (Japanese); Joel McDonald (English)
A toilet deity with a head resembling coiled feces, he provides Ichiko with a necklace that blocks her ability to drain others' fortune.

== Media ==
=== Manga ===
Written and illustrated by Yoshiaki Sukeno, Binbō-gami ga! was serialized in Shueisha's shōnen manga magazine Jump Square from June 4, 2008, to July 4, 2013. Shueisha collected its chapters in 16 tankōbon volumes, published between November 4, 2008, and September 4, 2013. Shueisha began publishing the manga in English on its Manga Million digital platform in 2026.

==== Volumes ====
No.	Release date	ISBN
01	November 4, 2008	978-4-08-874577-0
02	April 3, 2009	978-4-08-874647-0
03	May 1, 2009	978-4-08-874686-9
04	September 4, 2009	978-4-08-874733-0
05	December 4, 2009	978-4-08-874780-4
06	March 4, 2010	978-4-08-870031-1
07	July 2, 2010	978-4-08-870078-6
08	November 4, 2010	978-4-08-870135-6
09	March 4, 2011	978-4-08-870201-8
10	August 4, 2011	978-4-08-870280-3
11	December 2, 2011	978-4-08-870348-0
12	April 4, 2012	978-4-08-870408-1
13	July 4, 2012	978-4-08-870471-5
14	November 2, 2012	978-4-08-870540-8
15	March 4, 2013	978-4-08-870637-5
16	September 4, 2013	978-4-08-870811-9

=== Anime ===
A 13-episode anime television series adaptation by Sunrise was broadcast on TV Tokyo, TVA, and MBS from July 5 to September 27, 2012. The opening theme is "Make My Day!" by Piko and the ending theme is "Koi Bōdō" (恋暴動; "Love Riot") by Happy Birthday.

The series was licensed in North America by Funimation. It was released on home video on November 19, 2013.

==== Episodes ====
No.	Title	Original release date
1	"You Call Yourself a God, But Aren't You Less of a God of Misfortune and More of a God of Flat Chests?"; Transliteration: "Kami wa Kami demo Binbō-gami ja nakute Hinnyū-Gami no Machigai ja nai no?" (Japanese: 神は神でも貧乏神じゃなくて貧乳神の間違いじゃないの?)	July 5, 2012
The God of Misfortune, Momiji, is sent down to earth to greet a spoiled high-school girl named Ichiko Sakura, who has had good fortune all her life. Momiji explains that Ichiko has an abnormally high level of good fortune, and is also sucking up fortune from those near her. Momiji attempts to take some of Ichiko's fortune and make her a normal girl, but Ichiko manages to fight her off. The next day, however, Ichiko's butler, Suwano, has a heart attack and is left in a critical condition as a result of Ichiko taking his fortune over the years he served her. Ichiko agrees to let Momiji suck some good fortune out of her, but then she runs off with it and releases it at the hospital, saving Suwano's life. Afterwards, Ichiko decides to sack Suwano from his position so he can live his own life without being at risk. A week later, Ichiko's fortune levels soon return, as does Momiji.
2	"There Sure Is a "The Battle Between God and Girl Now Begins!" Feeling♥"; Transliteration: "Kore zo Masani "Kami to Shōjo no Tatakai ga Ima, Hajimaru..." tte Kanji ne♥" (Japanese: これぞまさに『神と少女の戦いが今、始まる――』って感じネ♥)	July 12, 2012
In order to get closer to Ichiko, Momiji transfers into her class, much to Ichiko's displeasure. As Momiji continues to bother her, Ichiko meets Bobby, a perverted travelling priest with the ability to detect fortune energy, giving her an item called the Soumin Shourai, allowing her to manifest her good fortune into various creatures. Momiji responds by manifesting her own monsters out of her misfortune, but they turn out to be useless and she is soundly beaten.
3	""Being Ordered Around by You Makes Me Really Angry Somehow!!!" "Whaddaya Mean, 'Somehow'!!?""; Transliteration: ""Omae ni Meirei Sareru no wa Nanka Haratatsu!!!" "Nankatte Nani!!?"" (Japanese: 「お前に命令されるのはなんか腹立つ!!!」「なんかって何!!?」)	July 19, 2012
Figuring she needs a boyfriend, Ichiko takes an interest in her sleepy classmate, Keita Tsuwabuki. Upon finding and returning his ID card, Ichiko is invited by Keita to have dinner with his siblings, who are quite poor as their parents had left them. Keita soon takes a strong dislike to Ichiko when she rejects his ideal that being together is more important than money. The next day, Ichiko tries to make up with Keita's brother Ryūta by buying him a super rare trading card. However, he ends up dropping the card down a sewer and gets trapped in there whilst attempting to retrieve it just as a typhoon starts to settle in. As Ichiko is told by Keita how he does not want to be in anyone's debt, Momiji makes her aware of the danger Ryūta is in, prompting her to go and save him. As Ryūta gets swept into the river, Ichiko dives in after him, using a device given to her by Momiji to use her fortune to rescue him. Afterwards, Keita and Ryūta give their thanks to Ichiko, who feels a warmth in her heart.
4	"He Shrank!"; Transliteration: "Chijindōru ya nāi ka!" (Japanese: 縮んど～るやな～いか！)	July 26, 2012
Momiji ends up summoning the masochistic dog god, Momo'o Inugami, and has him transform into a puppy so he can get close to Ichiko and attempt to steal her fortune. However, Momo'o finds that getting the fortune off of Ichiko is not as easy as it looks. As Momo'o observes Ichiko's behavior, he notices her personality is different when reading letters from Suwano. That night, as Momo activates a Misfortune Item to spread misfortune, the box containing Suwano's letters falls from the top of the desk, and is thrown away by the cleaners the next day. When Ichiko learns of this, she goes to the trash dump and spends the entire night searching for the box, much to Momo's surprise. Against his better judgement, Momo finds the box for Ichiko. As Momo deduces that Ichiko may not be such a bad person after all, his cover is blown when he reverts to human form, prompting a swift punishment from Ichiko.
5	"Who's the Flat-chested One Now? Huh? Huh!? Huh!!?"; Transliteration: "Docchi ga Hinnyū nanokana~? Un? Un!? Un!!?" (Japanese: どっちが貧乳なのかな～? ん? ん!? ん!!?)	August 2, 2012
Momiji uses an Aging Box given to her by the turtle god Urushiyama on Ichiko in an attempt to turn her into an old lady, but it instead turns her into a little kid. As Ichiko escapes from Momiji, she encounters one of Keita's sisters, Mika. As Ichiko spends time with Mika in order to avoid Momiji, she encounters Bobby and Momo, who tell her she needs to find another Ageing Box to turn her back to her normal age, and manages to get them to search for it. Ichiko then goes over to Keita's home and requests to sleep over whilst trying to keep her identity a secret. The next day, Momiji follows Ichiko as she goes with Keita's family on a picnic and manages to capture her once she is separated from the others. As Keita tries to search for her, he falls down a cliff side.
6	"Open Your EYES!!!!"; Transliteration: "Me o Akerooooo!!!!" (Japanese: 目を開けろぉぉぉぉ!!!!)	August 9, 2012
Ichiko manages to escape from Momiji only to learn that Keita had gone missing trying to search for her. Realising that Keita had all the things she lacked when she was a child, Ichiko enlists the help of Momo'o to locate Keita, finding him in a near-death state. As Ichiko tries to revive him, Momiji extracts a small amount of Ichiko's fortune energy so she can save him. Keita awakens the next day with his injuries healed and reunites with his family. As Bobby and Momo'o manage to locate Urushiyama and retrieve a box from him, Ichiko says goodbye to Keita before meeting up with them and returning to her normal age. However, the experience has left her in a solemn state, only appearing to react to Keita's presence. This turns out to be as she wants to try to return the handkerchief he received from him. After managing to return the handkerchief, she returns to her usual noisy self.
7	"Is This That Pattern Where You Were Brought Up Like a Man? / I'll Never Forget What Happened Today!!"; Transliteration: "Iwayuru Otoko Toshite Sodaterarechatta Patān? / Kyō no Koto wa Isshō Wasurenē yo!!" (Japanese: いわゆる男として育てられちゃったパターン？ / 今日のことは一生忘れねーよ!!)	August 16, 2012
When Ichiko is misunderstood as a shoplifter by the police, she manages to ditch the blame on a tough-looking girl who was passing by in order to escape. This girl turns out to be a transfer student named Ranmaru Rindou, who enrolls in Ichiko's class the next day. Irritated over what happened, Ranmaru challenges Ichiko to a fight, but immediately loses due to Ichiko's great luck. Following the fight, Ranmaru gains a crush on Keita, which Ichiko and Momiji are quick to notice. With their own motives, the two decide to give Ranmaru a makeover into something more girly. Although Ranmaru is pleased with her new look, it does not go down well with her father, Genjurou, who beats her and tears up her new outfit. Exploding with anger, Ichiko challenges Genjurou to a fight to make him stop forcing his ideals onto Ranmaru. As Ichiko is about to win, due to her luck, Ranmaru stops her, telling her that he is the only parent he has got. The next day, as Genjurou gives Ranmaru permission to wear what she wants, she decides she is more comfortable in her tough guy outfit.
8	"Call Me By My First Name"; Transliteration: "Namae de Yonde" (Japanese: 名前で呼んで)	August 23, 2012
Noticing Ichiko does not seem to get along with the other girls, Ranmaru tries being friendly with her, but her pride rejects her offer. The next day, a zealous classmate named Akane Tenge and her gang kidnap Ichiko and take her to the old school building with a plan to put her in her place. Ranmaru arrives to rescue her but as Ichiko manages to sneak away, the building collapses with Ranmaru inside it. As Ichiko becomes conflicted over whether to save Ranmaru or not, she recalls when she was younger when her best friend turned against her over a boy, which has haunted her to this day. Telling her to get over her cowardice, Momiji extracts some of Ichiko's Fortune, which Ichiko gives to Ranmaru, allowing her to escape. After the incident, Ichiko lets Ranmaru use one of Momiji's gadgets to learn about her past trauma, which caused her to have a fear of getting close to others. After hearing her story, Ranmaru makes a promise to never betray Ichiko and the two become friends on a first name basis.
9	"What!!! Now You Say This!? / There's No Way That Could Happen In Just 2 Minutes!!!!"; Transliteration: "Eh!!! Ima Saratto Ittane!? / Nifun de Kōnaru Wake Nē Daro!!!!" (Japanese: え!!!今さらっと言ったね!? / 2分でこうなるワケねーだろ!!!!)	August 30, 2012
As the school practises some mixed doubles tennis, Ichiko enters a heated match with Momiji with little regard for their respective partners' safety. Later, as Ichiko tries to teach herself how to cook, another God of Misfortune named Kuroyuri attempts to steal Ichiko's energy as well, but is thwarted by Ichiko's terrible cooking. Momiji soon decides to challenge Ichiko to a match to see who is the better cook, which Kuroyuri is forced to judge.
10	"Getting Kids Who Hate Pumpkins to Eat Them by Sneaking Them Into a Stew"; Transliteration: "Kabochagirai no Kodomo ni Kabocha Tabesasu tame Kossori Shichū ni Mazeteoku mitaina Mon Desu yo" (Japanese: カボチャ嫌いの子供にカボチャ食べさすためこっそりシチューに混ぜておくみたいなもんですよ)	September 6, 2012
On a rainy day, Ichiko discovers an abandoned kitten outside her building and decides to take it in, naming it Tama. As Ichiko becomes curious as to why Momiji has not been around lately, a toilet god named Ibuki appears before her, but Ichiko refuses to hear him out. The next day, Ichiko learns Momiji has kidnapped Tama and goes to the school gym to confront her. Momiji reveals she was the one who brought Tama to Ichiko's place in order to teach her what it's like to lose someone important. Momiji then goads Ichiko into using the Somin Shōrai and absorbs almost all of her Fortune Energy. As Momiji takes her leave, the gym catches fire, trapping Ichiko and Tama inside without her Fortune to save them. Ibuki then appears, explaining his mission was to save Tama from having what little Fortune she had drained by Ichiko. Offering to save Tama, Ibuki uses a device that can inject Fortune Energy into its target. However, he overshoots it and fills Tama with so much Fortune Energy that she transforms into a Beckoning Cat God. In her new form, Tama leads Ichiko to a safe exit, where she coincidentally runs into Momiji, who had returned to try to save her, and gets her Fortune back. After putting out the fire, Ichiko agrees to wear a charm given to her by Ibuki which keeps her from absorbing other people's Fortune.
11	"...Who!?"; Transliteration: "...Dare!?" (Japanese: …誰!?)	September 13, 2012
With her bath made a mess by Momiji, Ichiko goes with Ranmaru to the public baths, where they are joined by Keita and his family. The trip proves to be less than peaceful with Bobby and Momo'o trying to take a peek and Momiji up to her usual tricks. Realising Momiji has not had a bath in ages, Ichiko gives her and her familiar, Kumagai, a thorough cleaning. After Bobby makes light of Ranmaru's looks, she ends up busting down the wall between the men's and women's baths, leading to some embarrassing reveals. The next day, Ichiko is surprised to find Momiji with such a radiant personality.
12	"Someday, Call Me By My Name"; Transliteration: "Itsuka Namae de Yonde" (Japanese: いつか名前で呼んで)	September 20, 2012
Momiji's spry new personality, which has also extended to Kumagai, is a hit with everyone in school, but Ichiko remains suspicious that it is one of her plots. Momiji explains how, as a result of being washed in the human world, she has lost her powers and changed personality. Ichiko and the others attempt to turn Momiji back to her usual self with no avail. After some initial hesitation, Ichiko soon starts being friends with the new Momiji, finding it pleasantly peaceful. Some time later, Kumagai ends up getting dirty and reverting to normal, teaming up with Momo'o to try to revert Momiji to normal in the same manner.
13	"You Already Have the Answer"; Transliteration: "Sore Mō Kotae Deteru daro" (Japanese: それもう答え出てるだろ)	September 27, 2012
Deciding she likes Momiji the way she is, Ichiko grabs her and, with help from Ranmaru and Bobby, they make their escape from Kumagai and Momo'o on a delivery truck. As they give chase, Ranmaru stays behind to fend off Momo'o whilst Ichiko, armed with some power enhancing beads given to her by Bobby, fights against Kumagai to allow Momiji to escape. It is here that Kumagai tells her that if Momiji does not regain her powers by sunset, she will remain a human forever whilst the old Momiji will die. After some encouragement from Keita, Ichiko catches up to Momiji, who is being cornered on a bridge by Kumagai. As the wind blows Momiji off the bridge, Ichiko catches her, making the decision to drop her onto a garbage boat and return her to her normal self, resuming their love/hate relationship.

== See also ==
- Twin Star Exorcists, another manga series by the same author
