= Aretha II =

- Developer: Japan Art Media
- Publisher: Yanoman
- Series: Aretha
- Platform: Game Boy
- Release: JP: September 27, 1991
- Genre: Role-playing game

Aretha II (Note: Japanese: アレサ II, Hepburn: Aresa II) is a 1991 role-playing video game developed by Japan Art Media for the Game Boy. It was a sequel to the company's previous game Aretha (1990), and is set a year after Materia Weathers discovers that an evil being named Warick is stealing a powerful artifact. This leads to her partnering with her old friends to recover the item and save the world.

While having a similar battle system to the previous game, Aretha adds new battle mechanics such as weapons having the ability to break and a new "technical attack" system. Some towns in the game are now explored in a 2D side-scrolling style instead of the previous top-view form.

Mitsuru Takahashi of Japan Art Media said the response to Aretha II was lacklustre. It had a sequel with Aretha III (1992) for the Game Boy, followed by three new Aretha games for the Super Famicom.

== Plot and gameplay ==
Aretha II is set one year after the events of the first game, Aretha (1990). Materia Weathers celebrates her 18th birthday in Halo Halo Town at Old Man Floyd's house. Materia invites her former travelling companions, Doll, to her birthday. Shortly after, she discovers a plot about an evil being named Warwick who is stealing a powerful artifact called the Aretha-gi. This leads Materia and her friends to recover this item and save the world.

The battle system is still similar to the first game. It adds a "technical attack" system and removes the magical effects from weapons that were in the first game. Weapons in battle now also have the possibility of breaking, and can be repaired with items.

While exploring in the game, the first two towns have a traditional top-down view, while the rest of the villages throughout the game have a 2D side-scrolling view.

== Development and release ==
Aretha II was the second game in the Aretha series. Like the previous title, it was developed by Japan Art Media (JAM). Mitsuru Takahashi of JAM said that Aretha was conceived to be a three-part series. The game's development was announced as being 50% complete by April 1991. When asked about the difficulty of a forest section in the game, Takahashi said that he did not intend for the game to become difficult on purpose. He said that it only turned out this way as he grew up playing more challenging games.

Aretha II was released in Japan for the Game Boy on September 27, 1991. The game had one more follow-up on the Game with Aretha III (1992), followed by three more games on the Super Famicom.

== Reception ==
Reception

Review score
Publication	Score
Famitsu	6/10, 7/10, 6/10, 4/10

Takahashi said the response to Aretha II was lackluster. Four writers for the Japanese magazine Famicom Tsūshin reviewed the game. While one reviewer found the game's side-scrolling to move too slowly, critic Hirokazu Hamamura said that adjusting the moving speed to really high in the menu made the game way too fast. While Hamamura complimented the ability to talk to party members and the monster-catching ability was as fun as ever, another reviewer said that while fun, the large towns and too-similar dungeons were a drawback. Another reviewer complimented the graphics, but said that characters chatted so incessantly that it would give the player an information overload.

In a retrospective review, Daniel Todd of Hardcore Gaming 101 said that the graphics and character design were superior to the first game, with characters having improved portraits during the cutscenes, but found that the battle system had much more limiting strategy than the first title.

== See also ==
- List of Game Boy games
- List of role-playing video games: 1990 to 1991
