= Takeru =

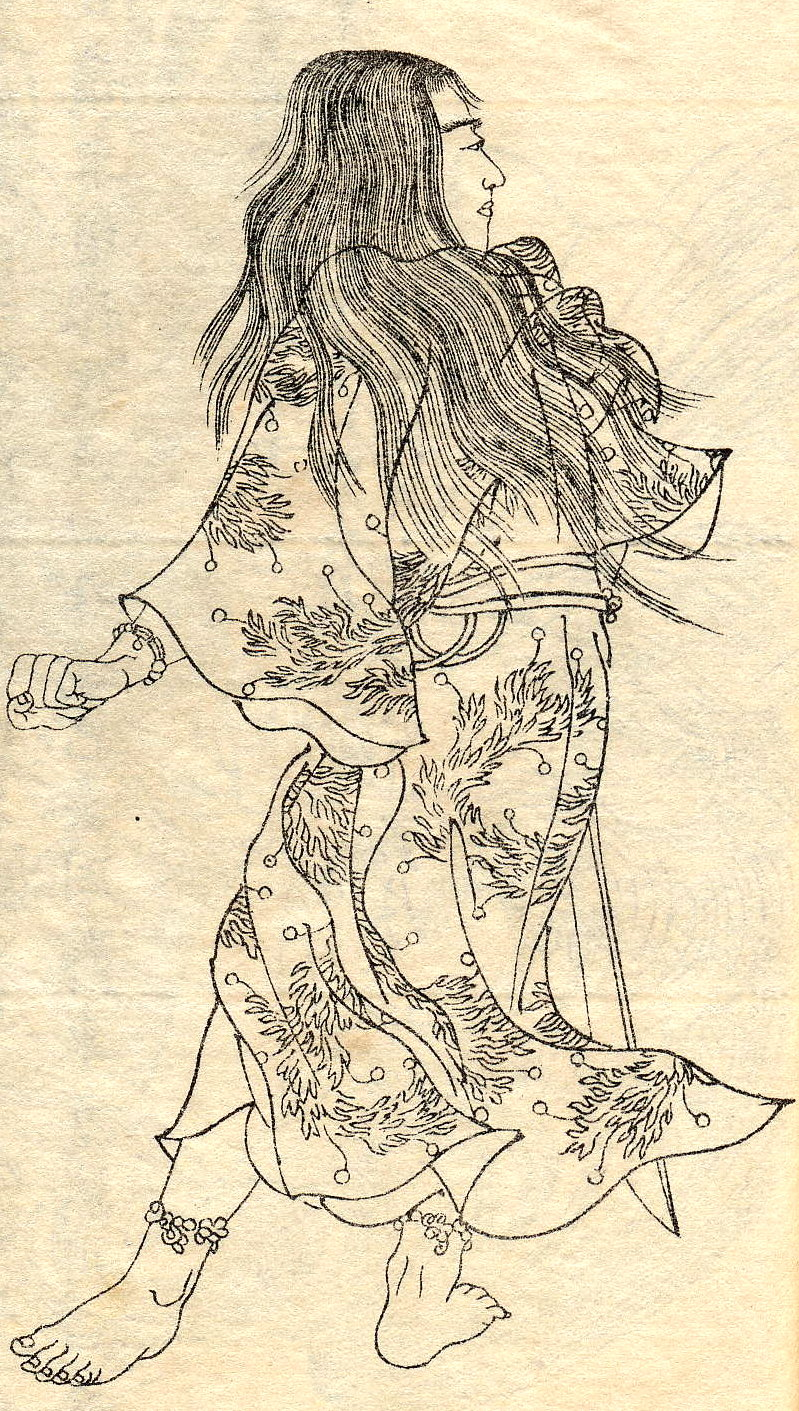
- Yamato Takeru, the legendary prince of the imperial dynasty
- Pronunciation: [ta.ke.ɾɯ]
- Gender: Male

Origin
- Origin: Japanese
- Meaning: It can have many different meanings depending on the kanji used.
- Region of origin: Japanese

Other names
- Related names: Takeo

Takeru (たける, タケル) is a masculine Japanese given name.

== Orthography ==
Takeru can be written using different kanji characters and can mean:

- 武, "warrior"
- 猛, "fierce"
- 健, "health"
- 尊, "noble"
- 岳, "mountain"

The name can also be written in hiragana or katakana.

Kanji combinations of the name are:

- 武尊
- 武瑠
- 武流
- 武琉
- 武留
- 丈瑠
- 丈流
- 丈琉
- 丈留
- 尊瑠
- 尊流
- 尊琉
- 尊留

== People ==
- Takeru (武瑠; born 1987), Japanese singer from the rock band Sug
- Takeru Amine Kataise (片伊勢武アミン; born 2004), Japanese figure skater
- Takeru Furumoto (古本 武尊; born 1990), Japanese retired baseball player
- Takeru Higuchi (1918–1987), American chemist
- Takeru Hokazono (外薗 健; born 2000), Japanese manga artist
- Takeru Imamura (今村 猛; born 1991), Japanese professional baseball player
- Takeru Inukai (犬養 健; 1896–1960), Japanese politician and novelist
- Takeru Itakura (板倉 洸; born 1998), Japanese footballer
- Takeru Kishimoto (岸本 武流; born 1997), Japanese professional footballer
- Takeru Kitazono (北園 丈琉; born 2002), Japanese male artistic gymnast
- Takeru Kiyonaga (清永 丈瑠; born 1994), Japanese football player
- Takeru Kobayashi (小林 尊; born 1978), Japanese former competitive eater
- Takeru Nagayoshi (永吉 たける; born 1978), Japanese manga artist
- Takeru Okada (岡田 武瑠; born 1994), Japanese football player
- Takeru Otsuka (大塚 健; born 2001), Japanese snowboarder
- Takeru Sasaki (佐々木 健; born 1996), Japanese professional baseball pitcher
- Takeru Satoh (佐藤 健; born 1989), Japanese actor
- Takeru Segawa (世川 武尊; born 1991), Japanese kickboxer
- Takeru Shibaki (柴木 丈瑠; born 1982), Japanese actor and voice actor
- Takeru Yamamoto (山本 遵; born 2006), Japanese curler
- Takeru Yamasaki (佐々木 健; born 1993), Japanese former professional Canadian football placekicker
- Takeru Yuzuki (柚木 武; born 1998), Japanese tennis player
- Yamato Takeru (タケル), legendary Japanese prince

== Fictional characters ==
- Takeru (aka RedMask), a character in Hikari Sentai Maskman
- Takeru (タケル), the main character in the Freedom Project by Nissin Cup Noodles
- Takeru (猛), secondary character from the visual novel, anime and manga Togainu no Chi
- Takeru Danma, a character known as "The Hatter" in Alice in Borderland, played by Nobuaki Kaneko
- Takeru Edogawa, a character in the manga series The Devil Does Exist
- Takeru Fujiwara, a character from Prince of Stride
- Takeru Homura, a main character in Yu-Gi-Oh! VRAINS
- Takeru Ibaraki, a character in the American-Japanese manga Witchblade Takeru
- Takeru Jakuzure, a character from Garo
- Takeru Kojo (古城 タケル), a supporting character in Little Battlers Experience WARS
- Takeru Mizushima (タケル), a character in the Japanese TV drama Last Friends
- Takeru Ohyama, the main character in the anime and manga series Maken-ki!
- Takeru Shiba, a character in Samurai Sentai Shinkenger
- Takeru Shirogane (白銀 武), the main character in the visual novel series Muv-Luv
- Takeru "T.K." Takaishi (タケル), a character in the anime and manga Digimon
- Takeru Takemoto (タケル), a character in the anime This Ugly Yet Beautiful World
- Takeru Teshimine (猛), a character in the anime and manga series GetBackers
- Takeru Yamato, the main character in the Dragon Knight series of Anime/H-games
- Takeru Tenkūji, the main character in Kamen Rider Ghost
- Takeru Tsukumo, a main character in the manga Exoskull Zero
- Takeru Totsuka, a main character in Kamigami no Asobi

== Other uses ==
- Takeru: Letter of the Law, an interactive manga
- Takeru, video game developer and publisher
- ja:Takeru, software distribution mechanism (sort of 'Copy-on-Demand') by Brother Industries in Japan
