= Cyber Knight =

1990 video game

- Super NES cover art
- Developer: Group SNE
- Publisher: Tonkin House
- Designer: Ryo Mizuno
- Artist: Kunio Okawara
- Platforms: PC Engine, Super Famicom
- Release: PC Engine: JP: October 10, 1990; Super Famicom: JP: October 30, 1992
- Genre: Role-playing
- Mode: Single-player

Cyber Knight (サイバーナイト, Saibā Naito) is a science fiction PC Engine and Super Famicom role-playing video game that combines sci-fi space exploration with strategic robot combat. This game is intended for experienced role-playing gamers only. The random encounters are high even for a Japanese role-playing game with a mid-to-late 1992 Super Famicom release date (e.g., Dragon Quest V: Hand of the Heavenly Bride) and the combat sequences (using melee attacks in addition to missiles and guns) are extremely slow. Two years later, a sequel was released for this game titled Cyber Knight II: Chikyū Teikoku no Yabō. The games were only released commercially in Japan, however there are a fan-translations from Japanese to English by Aeon Genesis.

== Gameplay ==
The object is to power up the human crew members and their mechs through combat experience points, explore strange new worlds using tools/weapons, and solve the problems of each alien civilization. The first mission involves saving an Earth-like planet of big people with a circa 1992 technology level from robots who want to wipe out humanity. On that planet, the president and his wife assume the throne positions of that of a king and a queen, even though their planet is assumed to be a democracy. Other quests involving trading stuff for a universal translator, braving a lava planet, and even using hyperdrive to get from planet to planet.

== Reception ==
On release, Famitsu magazine scored the PC Engine version of the game a 30 out of 40.
