= Hard Nova =

1990 video game

- Cover art by Nancy L. Fong
- Developer: Malibu Interactive
- Publisher: Electronic Arts
- Producers: Christopher Erhardt; Roland Kippenhan III
- Designer: Karl Buiter
- Programmers: Karl Buiter; Scott Fisher
- Artists: Mark Dickenson; Peggy Brennan; Cynthia Hamilton
- Writers: Eric Lindstrom; Jeff Haas
- Composer: Jon Medek
- Platforms: MS-DOS, Amiga, Atari ST
- Release: 1990
- Genre: Role-playing
- Mode: Single-player

Hard Nova is a role-playing video game developed by Malibu Interactive and published by Electronic Arts in 1990 for MS-DOS, Amiga, and Atari ST. It is a follow-up to Sentinel Worlds I: Future Magic from 1988.

== Gameplay ==
Hard Nova has a character creation element that allows players to choose their gender, and, unlike Sentinel Worlds I, lead a group of mercenaries.

== Reception ==
The game received 5 out of 5 stars in Dragon. Scorpia of Computer Gaming World opined in 1991 that Hard Nova greatly improved on Sentinel Worlds, and concluded that it "is a pretty decent game, with some interesting touches and a good storyline. While not a long-term epic, it should keep you occupied for awhile". Ken St. Andre wrote in the same issue of CGW that "it is a very good real-time shoot-'em-up game", but that the combat became boring and amoral and the game offered little exploration. In 1993, Scorpia said that Hard Nova was "definitely worth your attention if you like space games".

Jim Trunzo reviewed Hard Nova in White Wolf #26 (April/May, 1991), rating it a 5 out of 5 and stated that "It's hard to imagine what could be missing from Hard Nova. A simple, menu-driven interface, beautifully detailed graphics, a strong and open-ended storyline and realistic roleplaying features make Hard Nova worth the many hours you'll spend playing it. For those who enjoy an occasional walk on the wild side, try roleplaying a mercenary who's into something much bigger than he/she can possibly conceive. "
