= Crystal Warriors =

1991 video game

- Developer: Sega
- Publisher: Sega
- Artist: Kugatsuhime
- Composer: Yukifumi Makino
- Platform: Game Gear
- Release: JP: December 13, 1991; NA: April 1992; EU: 1992
- Genre: Strategy
- Modes: Single-player, multiplayer

Crystal Warriors (アーリエル クリスタル伝説, Ariel: Crystal Densetsu; "Ariel: Crystal Legend") is a turn-based strategy video game developed and published by Sega for the Game Gear in Japan in 1991 and in Europe and North America in 1992. It was re-released for Virtual Console in 2013. A Japan-only sequel Royal Stone was published in 1995.

== Gameplay ==
The gameplay of Crystal Warriors is similar to both the Fire Emblem and Shining Force series. The player forms a party of up to nine units to fight in each level. The player starts on one side of the map and an enemy force of up to nine units occupies a castle on the opposite side. The player must defeat the enemy force or move a unit on to the enemy castle entrance to complete each level.

Each level has terrain features which form bottlenecks or change the speed of units. The player controls specialized units belonging to a particular elemental group and most of the strategy revolves around the element of a given unit, its speciality and positioning. Each element is weak to one and strong versus another in a rock-paper-scissors system. Fire elemental units are strong against wind elemental units, while wind units are strong against water, and in turn water units are strong against fire. Earth-based units have no particular strengths or weaknesses to other elements. However, with the exception of the Princess(s) and Emperor Jyn the Earth-based units are all mages or healers and have a low base defence, making them vulnerable to combat units, unless they reach level 9 in which case they become the strongest unit in the game.

Whenever a player unit attacks an enemy unit or vice versa, a battle occurs. A battle consists of two rounds where the units can fight with melee weapons, spells or monsters. The attacking unit strikes first in each round. Each unit acquires four experience points for defeating an enemy. Each time the unit gains 10 experience points it increases in level, acquiring higher stats, with a maximum level of 9. Units can also defeat and "tame" monsters (which are also assigned an element) on each level, and use them in battle. Monsters, though very weak, are useful to avoid elemental weakness (a Fire Lord, for example, can tame a Wind monster, and use it in combat against a Water Fighter, thus flipping the elemental advantage). New units, weapons, armour, and spells can be bought in towns along with information on the nature of the next level, which may affect the player's choice of units.

The game includes a two player mode available by connecting to another Game Gear via a Gear-to-Gear cable. One player starts with Princess Iris and selects eight other team members from the recruitable characters found during the single player game. The other player starts with Princess Cham, an evil counterpart to Iris, and can select eight other team members from the standard Jyn forces (not the warlords, Grym or Emperor Jyn). Any map can be selected as an arena; teams start on a fortress and the opponent's team members are revealed in the same way as the single player version (by combat or spell). To win, the player has to defeat the entire opposing force or take the enemy fortress.

== Plot ==
The game follows the adventures of the sorceress Princess Iris of Arliel. The evil Jyn have overrun her father's lands and stolen three of the four elemental crystals used to keep the peace. Her quest takes her through the lands of Arliel to fight the Jyn's elemental governors and reclaim the crystals before defeating Emperor Grym and his mysterious overlord. Aside from the introduction (and closing), there is no plot development in the game.

== Reception ==
The game received good reviews upon its original release, including 4/5 from GamePro, 80% from Mega Fun (Germany), 80% from Player One (France), and 91% from Sega Force (Sweden).

In a retrospective review, Nintendo Life's Damien McFerran gave it an average rating of five out of ten stars, opining: "While a great many RPGs from the early '90s remain astonishingly playable even today, Crystal Warriors is an example of a relic from the past which really deserves to stay there." Jacob Whritenour from Hardcore Gamer was much more positive and wrote the game "deserves a remake."
