= Aretha (video game) =

- Developer: Japan Art Media
- Publisher: Yanoman
- Series: Aretha
- Platform: Game Boy
- Release: JP: November 16, 1990
- Genre: Role-playing game

Aretha (Note: Japanese: アレサ, Hepburn: Aresa) is a 1990 role-playing game developed by Japan Art Media for the Game Boy. It has a fantasy-themed story about the Princess of Aretha named Materia, who seeks out to free her land after it was taken over long ago by a Demon King.

The game was published by Yanoman and received positive reviews scores in Famicom Tsūshin, while a reviewer in Hardcore Gaming 101 felt it was a higher quality game than contemporary home console RPGs for the Family Computer. Both publications commented on the games high difficulty level. The game spawned five follow-ups, with two on the Game Boy and three on the Super Famicom, while none of the game in the Aretha series were officially released in English.

== Plot and gameplay ==
Aretha is a fantasy-themed role-playing game (RPG). The game is about the Princess of Aretha named Materia. After her kingdom is invaded and her sister is kidnapped by the Demon King Howard, Materia is sent down a river in a basket. She is taken into the care by a person named Old Man Floyd. Materia eventually learns about the origins of her birth and sets off to free her kingdom. During the game, Materia can recruit two more party members: Doll and Sybil.

This game also introduced the use of kanji characters in the font, while other RPGs would primarily use hiragana and katakana. The game also has a "fuzzy system", which allows the player character to bump into a wall and continue moving in a certain direction instead of coming to a complete stop.

While traversing the world map, Materia will engage in a "self-talk" cutscene, where she wonders aloud what she should do next as a way to guide the player to the next location. When attacking enemies, it becomes command based where the player can choose options for their party such as attacking, using magic, or running from the battle. The game also introduced a capsule system, that lets the player capture a monster, and use it once again in a new battle.

== Development ==
Aretha was developed by Japan Art Media, a company formed on November 9, 1989. The game was published by Yanoman, which was predominantly known for making jigsaw puzzles. Yanoman entered into the video game business after being triggered by the toy wholesalers reporting to the company that it was an era of video games instead of toys. They saw the low development cost for Game Boy titles at the time as being comparable to that of investing in jigsaw puzzles, which led to their involvement in Aretha.

The original developer of the game was Mitsuru Takahashi. Takahashi had previously worked for Glodia where he developed a game called Zavas (Note: サバッシュ) (1988) which he described as a proto-type version of Aretha. He said that Aretha had a very limited storage capacity so a lot of effort was spent on incorporating images and scenarios. This led to reusing some of the text in the game word for word In the game, Aretha featured a female protagonist, which was unusual for an RPG at the time. The ability to capture a monster in a capsule in the game was inspired by the television series Ultraseven (1967-1968).

== Release and reception ==
Reception

Review score
Publication	Score
Famitsu	7/10, 7/10, 7/10, 5/10

Aretha was released in Japan on November 16, 1990 for the Game Boy. The game spawned Aretha video game series. From 1990 to 1995, the series and had five titles; two more on the Game Boy, and three on the Super Famicom. Takahashi said that Aretha was conceived to be a three-part series, but the first game was designed to be a complete story if the sequel never materialized. The next game, Aretha II, was released in 1991. All the follow-ups were published by Yanoman. No games in the Aretha series have ever received an official English-language release.

Four writers for the Japanese magazine Famicom Tsūshin reviewed the game. Three of the reviewers found the game quite difficult as the enemies kept being balanced with the player as they levelled up. Other reviewers complimented the graphics, controls with one player saying the capsule system of having monsters battle along with the player to be innovative. While reviewer found the narrative and graphics to be high quality, another said the "self-talk" element grew to become annoying.

From a retrospective review on Hardcore Gaming 101, Danield Todd said that while many Japanese developers had difficulty with the limitations of the Game system in 1990, Aretha was an even more quality game than its counterparts on the Family Computer (Famicom). Todd echoed the difficulty of the game, saying that the first enemy could easily defeat the player easily if they were unlucky enough to fight three at a time instead of one and have picked the correct weapon for the battle.

Yanoman's target audience for the game was at elementary school students to early high school students. They said that they gave the game a slightly more mature aesthetic to have it aimed at younger people who want to appear older. They found that the amount of kanji in the text was ultimately a problem as the younger audience would not have learned much of it yet.

== See also ==
- List of Game Boy games
- List of role-playing video games: 1990 to 1991
