= Synaesthete (video game) =

2007 video game

- Developer(s): DigiPen Institute of Technology; Rolling Without Slipping
- Designer(s): Joseph Tkach III
- Platform(s): Windows
- Release: NA: October 1, 2007
- Genre(s): Music
- Mode(s): Single-player

Synaesthete is a freeware game developed by four students at the DigiPen Institute of Technology under the team name Rolling Without Slipping. Synaesthete is a marriage of arcade-style music games such as Dance Dance Revolution and PC role-playing games such as Diablo II. At first glance, the feel of the game will be similar to an action RPG, but with several key differences. First, there is no inventory management, so players do not collect or equip items. Second, player actions such as attacking monsters and casting spells must occur synchronously with the music in order to be effective. Third, the game is not story-driven, and there are no friendly NPCs. The focus of the player is to explore a music-driven environment, where the music that is playing changes the world, and reaching different parts of the world changes the music, as well as character advancement, which is accomplished by killing enemies and reacting synchronously to the music.

You control an avatar named the Zaikman, named after the team's producer Zach Aikman. The Zaikman is referred to as a defense mechanism for the collective unconscious, and you use him to destroy enemies and progress through various levels.

At the 2008 Independent Games Festival, Synaesthete was nominated for the Student Showcase, and Excellence in Visual Art. The game claimed the prize for Best Student Game among the 125 student entrants that year.

== Gameplay ==
=== Controls ===
To play Synaesthete, the player must simultaneously move the character using the W, A, S, and D keys (default) to dodge enemies, while matching three music patterns using the J, K, and L keys (default). The music matching is similar to games like Beatmania, where the player must press the corresponding key at the right moment, in time with the music. Each successful hit of these "notes" will fire a beam from the Zaikman and wound an enemy. Synaesthete differs from most music-based games, however; the player is not required to hit every note. Instead, allowing notes to be missed simply means that the corresponding beam will not be fired. As each musical pattern is linked to a different track in the music (i.e., kick drum, synth, etc.), many players find it easier to focus on one or two and ignore the third.

=== Levels ===
Each level of Synaesthete belongs to one of three "Visions," where each Vision corresponds to a different style of electronic music. The "Way of the Samurai" vision corresponds to trance, "Synaesthete" to house, and "Like a Child" to hardcore. Each level corresponds to a song, and one level in each Vision contains a boss encounter. There are three levels to each Vision, and a final stand-alone level. Together, this accounts for 10 playable songs, all composed by the team's technical director, William Towns.

== Soundtrack ==
Track listing
No.	Title	Length
1.	"TownHouse"	3:19
2.	"Gearbox"	3:15
3.	"Tryptonaut"	3:30
4.	"Mountain"	3:18
5.	"Shore"	6:00
6.	"Blackberry"	3:29
7.	"Luminous Voluminous"	3:43
8.	"This is Hardcore"	3:22
9.	"Elation"	2:28
10.	"Dance of the Zaikmans"	1:44
11.	"Menu"	1:28
12.	"Credits"	2:10

== Rolling Without Slipping ==
Listed below are the developers of Synaesthete, and their primary role:
Zach Aikman - Producer
Joseph Tkach - Designer
William Towns - Technical Director & Musician
Andy Maneri - Product Manager
