= Retha =

Retha is a feminine given name which may refer to:

- Retha Walden Gambaro (1917–2013), American sculptor and gallery owner
- Retha Swindell (fl. 1975–1979), American college basketball player
- Retha Warnicke (born 1939), American historian
- Retha Welch (died 1987), American murder victim
