= Sentinel Worlds I: Future Magic =

1988 video game

- Developer(s): Karl Buiter
- Publisher(s): Electronic Arts
- Producer(s): David Albert
- Artist(s): Michael Kosaka
- Composer(s): David Warhol
- Platform(s): MS-DOS, Commodore 64
- Release: 1988
- Genre(s): Role-playing/Strategy
- Mode(s): Single-player

Sentinel Worlds I: Future Magic is a 1988 role-playing video game developed by Karl Buiter and published by Electronic Arts for the MS-DOS and Commodore 64 computer systems.

Set in the year 2995, Sentinel Worlds I: Future Magic is an innovative game that allowed a player to command a crew of five Federation officers and embark on an epic quest to save the Caldorre System from space raiders. The player's mission is to develop a crew and a starship and find the raiders' base and rid the system of them. The game was particularly notable for a musical score that simulated multiple instruments by swapping between them faster than the human ear could differentiate.

== Gameplay ==
Sentinel Worlds I: Future Magic combines both the elements of Starflight and The Bard's Tale, and featured some innovations which set it apart from other games at the time. It was one of the pioneers in the budding sci-fi RPG genre.

The game is non-linear and allows players to ignore the entire plot and explore space for as long as they wanted. It mixes elements of an RPG with a space-shooter, requiring both strategy and tactics as the player would have to dog fight enemy vessels. Players can also choose to venture into trading by mining and harvesting resources on other planets. Much of the game also takes the players onto the ground, where they can fight ground battles using a wire-frame 3D display of their environment and engage in conversation, combat, or trade.

The main component of the game starts out in the dog fighting space combat scenario, fighting to protect merchant shipping. As the story progresses, other elements of the game, including exploration, trade, conversation, ship boarding, ground combat and investigation are brought into the mix. Players must balance their resources and cash with repairs from battle, buying new weapons and armor, and upgrading their vessel.

== Plot ==
=== Setting ===
At the start of the game, the players are sent as part of a task force to combat a group of mysterious space raiders in the Caldorre system, who appear from nowhere to ravage merchant shipping in the area. Earlier efforts with battleships were ineffective against the light, agile raiders, so smaller Interceptor-class vessels with specially trained crews were dispatched to counter the threat and eventually end it. The Caldorre system has only three worlds—Caldorre itself, inhabited by a technologically advanced culture that dwells in huge towers on the planet's surface and service passing ships; Norjaenn, a frontier like world embroiled in a bitter war between rancher types and settler farmers over limited land space, and Ceyjavik, an icy world that is home to many exotic arctic animals and a small research station.

=== Story ===
In the year 2995, the Federation dispatches a squadron of Interceptor fighters to the Caldorre system with orders to investigate reports of mysterious pirate attacks on merchant shipping. The player controls the crew of one such vessel, a team of five. The investigation proves quite difficult as the enemy, known as the "Raiders", self-destruct their ships when boarded and their personnel suicide upon capture. Solving the mystery requires thoroughly exploring all three of the inhabited planets in the system, resolving diplomatic disputes, and unlocking secret power and knowledge which grants the player characters paranormal abilities. These abilities, which are critical to plot advancement, are the reason for the phrase "Future Magic" in the game's title.

Unlocking these abilities allows the player to uncover the true, terrible secret of the Caldorre system. When the true enemy is at last revealed, the characters embark on a final, daring mission to board an enemy space installation while the remainder of the Federation fleet engages the Raiders in a climatic final space battle.

== Reception ==
Scorpia in Computer Gaming World had mixed feelings about Sentinel Worlds. In 1988 she described the graphics, especially during takeoff and landing, as "the most exceptional use of EGA graphics I've seen yet in an adventure game", but criticized the slow movement speed both indoors and out, as well as the fact that only the team leader could be directly controlled, with the computer controlling the remainder of the team, sometimes poorly. Scorpia wrote in 1989: "Several have written to me, asking if there is more to the game than shooting down raider ships. There certainly is, but it will take awhile before the "real" action starts". In 1993 she called Sentinel Worlds "an interesting science-fiction CRPG" with a "good plot" but "terrible ending ... if you can live with that, this is a good game to play". Orson Scott Card was more positive, writing in Compute! that "no other game ... matches Sentinel Worlds for sheer depth". He praised the graphics and writing, which he compared to the "embarrassingly bad writing in the Ultima series".

== See also ==
- Hard Nova, also by Karl Buiter and considered a quasi-sequel
- Starflight
- Star Control 2
- Elite (1984)
- Ironseed (1994)
