= Aretha (video game series) =

Video game series

- Aretha the Super Famicom cover art by Tosihiro Nukiyama
- Developers: Japan Art Media; Game Arts
- Publisher: Yanoman Corporation
- First release: Aretha; 16 November 1990
- Latest release: Rejoice: Aretha Oukoku no Kanata; 21 April 1995

Aretha (Note: Japanese: アレサ; "Aretha") is a series of role-playing video games developed by Japan Art Media (JAM) and published by Yanoman Corporation to an exclusively Japanese market. It was originally released for the Game Boy in 1990. A sequel to the original trilogy named Aretha the Super Famicom was later released for the Super Famicom in 1993. Aretha was the first title in the game series of the same name. A collection of the Super Famicom trilogy is planned for release on July 30, 2026, for modern consoles exclusively for Japan.

== Gameplay ==
In the SNES version, an all-directional random encounter turn-based battle screen is used that allows enemies to attack from the rear, the side, and the front.

== Plot ==
Aretha tells the story of Ariel, the granddaughter of a wise old grandmother who has been turned a ten-year-old, who has been given a simple task: to go through the forest to Nineveh, the nearby town, and meet a certain person while visiting the place. Eventually, Ariel uses this quest to hone her magic skills to fight the ultimate battle against evil.

== Development ==
Aretha was developed by Japan Art Media and published by Yanoman.

== Games ==
Game	Details
Aretha 16 November 1990 – Game Boy	
Aretha II 27 September 1991 – Game Boy	
Aretha III 16 October 1992 – Game Boy	
Aretha the Super Famicom 26 November 1993 – SNES	
Aretha II: Ariel no Fushigi na Tabi 2 December 1994 – SNES	
Rejoice: Aretha Oukoku no Kanata 21 April 1995 – SNES	
Aretha Collection 1993-1995 30 July 2026 – Nintendo Switch, PlayStation 4, PlayStation 5	Notes: A compilation of the three SNES games, Aretha the Super Famicom, Aretha II: Ariel no Fushigi na Tabi, and Rejoice: Aretha Oukoku no Kanata. A special edition contains bonus materials.

== Reception ==
The Super Famicom version of the game was on the console's top-ten bestseller list in early 1994.

== Legacy ==
Aretha was followed by two sequels, Aretha II: Ariel no Fushigi na Tabi (ARETHA II ~アリエルの不思議な旅~) and Aretha III, and a standalone side-story game Rejoice: Aretha Ōkoku no Kanata (リジョイス 〜アレサ王国の彼方〜). They were released for the same platforms between 1991 and 1995.
