= Momotarō Densetsu =

Japanese video game series

Momotarō Densetsu (桃太郎伝説; lit. "Momotarō Legend" or "Peach Boy Legend"), also known by the abbreviated name Momoden, is a role-playing video game series in Japan featuring the character Momotarō (桃太郎; lit. "Peach Boy") from Japanese folklore, as well as other Japanese folklore characters such as Kintarō, Urashima Tarō, and Princess Kaguya (from The Tale of the Bamboo Cutter). The first game in franchise, Momotarō Densetsu, had shipped 1 million copies in Japan.

Started in 1987, the series was initially produced by Hudson Soft. Konami absorbed the company in 2012. In 2015, a rumor stated that the franchise was acquired by Nintendo, though no official word from either Nintendo or Konami has been given. Momotarō Densetsu has many sub-series, including Momotaro Dentetsu. As with Momotaro Dentetsu, the project supervisor for the Momotarō Densetsu series is Akira Sakuma, with illustration by Takayuki Doi (土居 孝幸) and main music production by Kazuyuki Sekiguchi of Southern All Stars.

In addition to the Momotarō Densetsu and Momotaro Dentetsu series, Hudson has produced several other video games in the Momotarō franchise, including the Momotarō Festival (桃太郎まつり, Momotarō Matsuri) series, the Momotarō Thunderbolt (桃太郎電劇, Momotarō Dengeki) series, and Momotarō Katsugeki (桃太郎活劇). The franchise has sold 15 million units, including the Momotaro Dentetsu spin-off series.

A Momotarō Densetsu anime series was also broadcast, which had its own spinoff, PEACH COMMAND: Shin Momotarō Densetsu (PEACH COMMAND 新桃太郎伝説), featuring a different storyline set in outer space. Both series were animated by Knack Productions.

== Video games ==
- Momotarō Densetsu (桃太郎伝説) (Famicom: 1987-10-26, X68000: 1988-02-26, PlayStation: 1998-12-23)
- Momotarō Densetsu Turbo (桃太郎伝説ターボ) (PC Engine: 1990-07-20)
- Momotarō Densetsu II (桃太郎伝説II) (PC Engine: 1990-12-22)
- Momotarō Densetsu Gaiden (桃太郎伝説外伝) (Game Boy: 1991-12-26, PC Engine: 1992-12-04, Famicom: 1993-12-17)
- Shin Momotarō Densetsu (新桃太郎伝説) (Super Famicom: 1993-12-24)
- Momotarō Densetsu 1→2 (桃太郎伝説1→2) (Game Boy Color: 2001-01-01)
- Momotarō Densetsu Mobile (桃太郎伝説モバイル) (i-mode: 2011-04-18, Yahoo! Keitai (Yahoo!ケータイ): 2011-04-28)
- Momotaro Dentetsu spin-off series
- DreamMix TV World Fighters (ドリームミックスTV ワールドファイターズ) (GameCube, PlayStation 2: 2003-12-18)
