= Wasteland (video game series) =

Video game series

- Genre: Role-playing
- Developers: Interplay Productions (1988); inXile Entertainment (2012-present); Krome Studios (2020)
- Publishers: Electronic Arts (1988); Deep Silver (2012-2020); Xbox Game Studios (2020-present)
- Creator: Brian Fargo
- Platforms: MS-DOS; Microsoft Windows; Nintendo Switch; PlayStation 4; Xbox One; Linux; Mac OS X
- First release: Wasteland; January 2, 1988
- Latest release: Wasteland 3 August 28, 2020

Wasteland is a role-playing video game series created by Brian Fargo. The first game, Wasteland, was originally developed by Interplay Productions and published by Electronic Arts in 1988.

inXile Entertainment later acquired the intellectual property from Electronic Arts and developed two sequels, Wasteland 2 (2014) and Wasteland 3 (2020), based on crowdfunding and published by Deep Silver.

The games are set in post-apocalyptic open worlds and feature turn-based combat similar to that of the earlier Fallout games (also developed by Interplay), of which they are a spiritual predecessor.

Xbox Game Studios owns the series after their acquisition of inXile Entertainment.

== Games ==
Release timeline Main series in bold
1988	**Wasteland**
1989
1990	Fountain of Dreams
1991
1992
1993
1994
1995
1996
1997
1998
1999
2000
2001
2002
2003
2004
2005
2006
2007
2008
2009
2010
2011
2012
2013
2014	**Wasteland 2**
2014	Wasteland Remastered
2015
2016
2017
2018
2019
2020	**Wasteland 3**

=== Wasteland (1988) ===
Wasteland was developed by Interplay Productions, which later developed the Fallout series. The game was published by Electronic Arts. A remaster developed by Krome Studios and inXile Entertainment and published by Xbox Game Studios was released in 2020, months before the release of Wasteland 3.

=== Wasteland 2 (2014) ===
Wasteland 2 was developed after Brian Fargo, the director of the original game, obtained the rights from Electronic Arts in 2003. Fargo developed the game with his company inXile through crowdfunding in 2012. The game was released in 2014 for Linux, MacOS, and Windows. InXile earned $12 million in revenue from the game. A director's cut of Wasteland 2 was released for Linux, Mac, Windows, PlayStation 4, and Xbox One in 2015 and for Nintendo Switch in 2018.

=== Wasteland 3 (2020) ===
Wasteland 3 has improved graphics but a shorter playtime of 50 hours compared to the second installment, which had over 100 hours, and is set in Colorado. It includes co-op multiplayer with two players, as well as an updated combat system similar to XCOM: Enemy Unknown. The game was released on Linux, macOS, PlayStation 4, Windows and Xbox One in 2020.

== Novellas ==
inXile had planned to set up two novella series for the franchise after releasing Wasteland 2. These were to be called Rangers & Raiders and Cults & Criminals. However the project was soon abandoned with only three digital novellas released and a fourth one authored by Chris Avellone being shelved.

The three digital novellas for Wasteland 2 were released alongside its "Director's Cut". Two of them, The Earth Transformed – Ghost Book I and Death Machines – Ghost Book II, written by Michael A. Stackpole and Nathan Long, form part of a single narrative and feature Ghost, a clone who joins the Desert Rangers during the events of the first game. All Bad Things was meanwhile written by Stephen Blackmoore and focuses on Luke Samson, the founder of the religious cult called "God's Militia" which appears in Wasteland 2. Those who bought the director's cut received the novellas for free. All Bad Things was also released in paperback format. In 2018, inXile gave away the novellas for free to those who purchased Wasteland – 30th Anniversary Edition.

Upon the release of Wasteland 3, three more digital novellas were released and focus on characters from the game. Legend by Ari Marmell focuses on Saul Buchanan, No Way Home by Carrie Cuinn focuses on Angela Deth, and Ironclad by Matt Wallace focuses on Ironclad Cordite. They were included in the game's "Digital Deluxe Edition".

== See also ==
- Fountain of Dreams
- Meantime
