= Wasteland (video game) =

1988 video game

- Cover art by Barry E. Jackson
- Developers: Interplay Productions; Remastered inXile Entertainment; Krome Studios
- Publishers: Electronic Arts; Remastered inXile Entertainment (Win, OSX, Lin); Xbox Game Studios (Xbox One)
- Director: Brian Fargo
- Producer: David Albert
- Designers: Ken St. Andre; Michael A. Stackpole; Liz Danforth
- Programmer: Alan Pavlish
- Artists: Todd J. Camasta; Bruce Schlickbernd; Charles H. H. Weidman III
- Writers: Ken St. Andre; Michael A. Stackpole
- Composer: Edwin Montgomery (remaster)
- Series: Wasteland
- Platforms: Apple II, Commodore 64, MS-DOS; Remastered; Windows, OS X, Linux, Xbox One
- Release: Apple II; March 1988; MS-DOS; February 1989; Remastered; February 25, 2020
- Genre: Role-playing
- Mode: Single-player

Wasteland is a role-playing video game developed by Interplay Productions and published by initially Electronic Arts in March 1988. The first installment of the Wasteland series is set in a futuristic, post-apocalyptic America, destroyed by a nuclear holocaust generations before. Developers originally made the game for the Apple II and it was ported to the Commodore 64 and MS-DOS. It was re-released for Microsoft Windows, OS X, and Linux in 2013 via Steam and GOG.com, and in 2014 via Desura. A remastered version titled Wasteland Remastered was released on February 25, 2020, in honor of the original game's 30th anniversary.

Critically acclaimed and commercially successful, Wasteland was intended to be followed by two separate sequels in the 1990s, but Electronic Arts dropped claims of Fountain of Dreams being a sequel and Interplay's Meantime was canceled. The game's general setting and concept was an inspiration for Interplay's 1997 role-playing video game Fallout and the Fallout series. Decades later, inXile Entertainment, founded by the game's director Brian Fargo, released two proper sequels: Wasteland 2 (2014) and Wasteland 3 (2020).

== Gameplay ==
A screenshot of an encounter with mutated "Drools" in the IBM PC compatible version

Wasteland's game mechanics are based on those used in tabletop role-playing games, such as Tunnels & Trolls and Mercenaries, Spies and Private Eyes created by Wasteland designers Ken St. Andre and Michael Stackpole. Characters in Wasteland have seven attributes–strength, intelligence, luck, speed, agility, dexterity, and charisma–that allow the characters to use different skills and weapons. Experience is gained through combat and skill usage to level up, or promote, characters. The player's party begins with four members and can grow to as many as seven by recruiting citizens and wasteland creatures. Unlike other computer role-playing games of the time, these non-player characters might at times refuse to follow the player's commands, such as when the player orders the character to give up an item or perform an action. The game is noted for its high and unforgiving difficulty level. The prose appearing in the game's combat screens, such as phrases saying an enemy is "reduced to a thin red paste" and "explodes like a blood sausage", prompted an unofficial PG-13 sticker on the game packaging in the U.S.

Wasteland was one of the first games featuring a persistent world, where changes to the game's open world were stored and kept. Returning to an area later in the game, the player would find it in the state the player left it, rather than being reset, as was common for games of the time. Since hard drives were still rare in home computers in 1988, this meant the original game disk had to be copied first.

Another feature of the game was the inclusion of a printed collection of paragraphs that the player would read at the appropriate times. These paragraphs described encounters, conversations and contained clues. Because disk space was at a premium, it saved on resources to have most of the game's story printed out in a separate manual rather than stored within the game's code itself. The paragraph books also served as a rudimentary form of copy protection; someone playing a copied version of the game would miss out on story elements and clues necessary to progress. The paragraphs included an unrelated story line about a mission to Mars intended to mislead those who read the paragraphs when not instructed to, and a false set of passwords that would trip up cheaters.

== Plot ==
In 2087, generations after the devastation of a global nuclear war in 1998, a remnant force of the United States Army called the Desert Rangers operates in the Southwestern United States, acting as peacekeepers to protect fellow survivors and their descendants. A team of Desert Rangers is assigned to investigate a series of disturbances in nearby areas. Throughout the game, the rangers explore the remaining enclaves of human civilization, including a post-apocalyptic Las Vegas.

As the group's investigation deepens, the rangers discover evidence of a larger menace threatening to exterminate what is left of humankind. A pre-war artificial intelligence operating from a surviving military facility, Base Cochise, is constructing armies of killer machines and cybernetically modified humans to attack human settlements with the help of Irwin Finster, the deranged former commander of the base. Finster has gone so far as to transform himself into a cyborg under the AI's control. The AI's ultimate goal is to complete Finster's "Project Darwin" and replace the world's "flawed" population with genetically pure specimens. With help from a pre-war android named Max, the player recovers the necessary technology and weapons in order to confront the AI at Base Cochise and destroy it by making the base's nuclear reactor melt down.

== Development ==
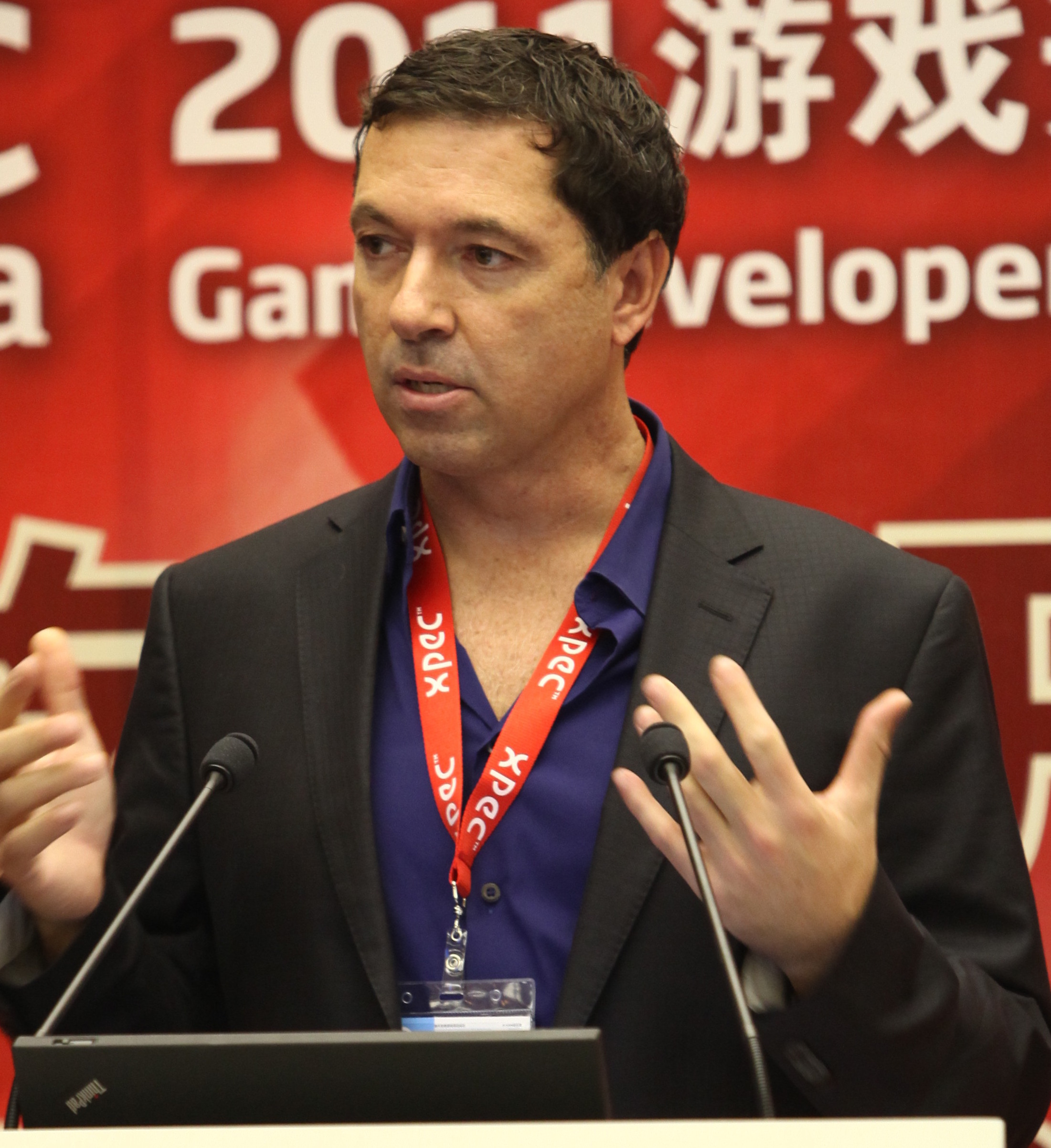
Brian Fargo in 2011, the game's director

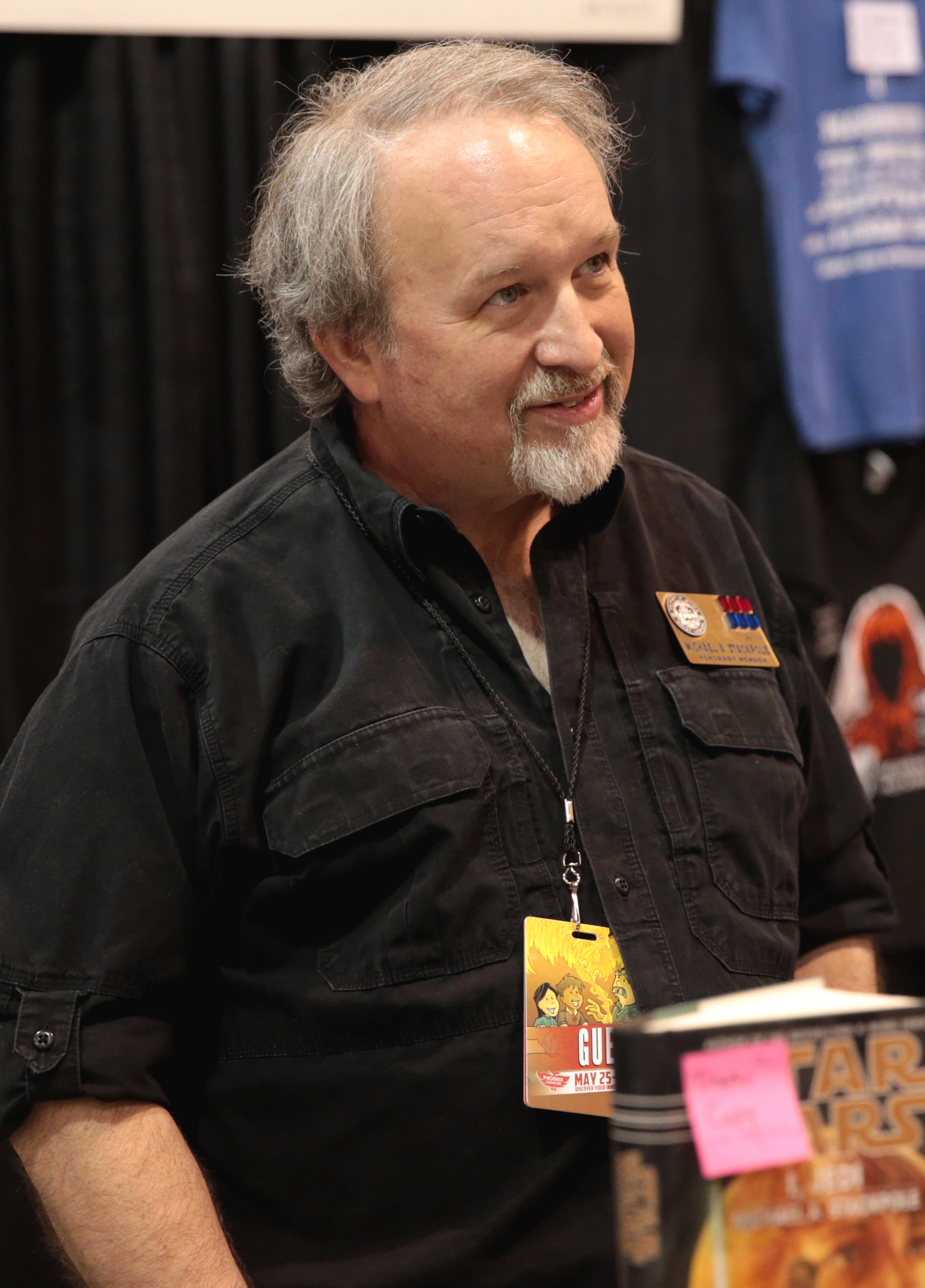
Michael Stackpole at the 2017 Phoenix Comicon

In an interview with Hartley and Patricia Lesse for MicroTimes in 1987, game director Brian Fargo said that Interplay Productions started work on the game in 1986. He also said the game was created on the Apple II, as it was equally important to him as the Commodore 64. Fargo described the game as a hybrid of the Ultima series and The Bard's Tale, with a post-apocalyptic setting similar to the Mad Max film series. As to the combat, Fargo stated that it resembled that of The Bard's Tale and contained additional strategy elements, including the ability to split or disband the party and change the player's character point-of-view.

In later interviews, Fargo said Wasteland came about after the success of The Bard's Tale and Interplay's desire to make another role-playing game for Electronic Arts separate from a sequel to the game. He added that the setting was inspired by his love for Mad Max 2 and post-apocalyptic fiction. While searching for a gameplay system for their new game, they came across the system of Mercenaries, Spies and Private Eyes. Its author Michael Stackpole was announced as the writer for Wasteland in 1987.

Alan Pavlish was the lead developer of the game, writing it in Apple II machine language and programming the game to react to player choices. Ken St. Andre said Fargo's pitch to him was for a post-nuclear holocaust game that allowed for weapons capable of inflicting area effect damage to be used and the map be modified "on the fly". Fargo said the game was in development for five years.

=== Writing ===
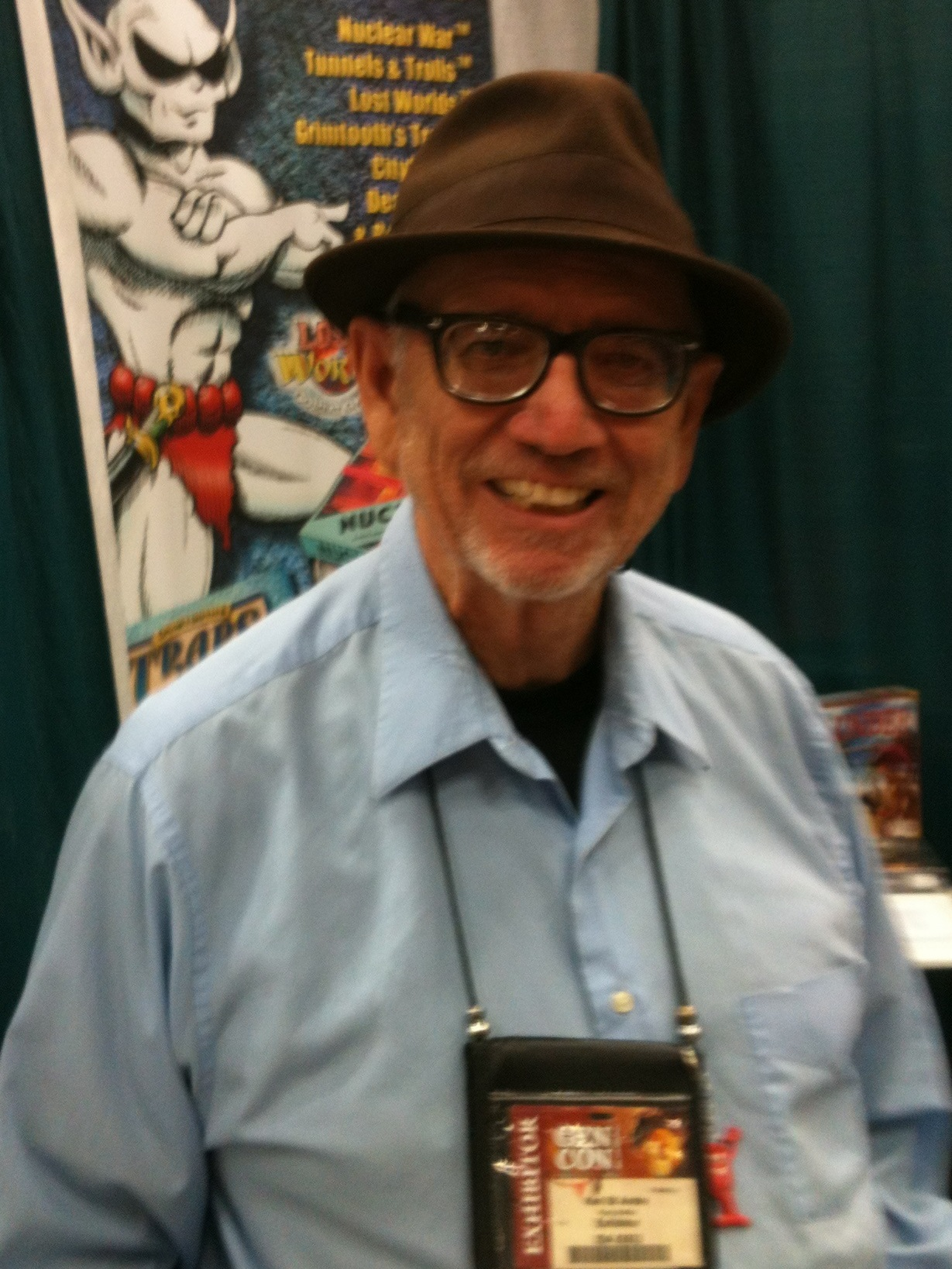
Ken St Andre in 2014; he served as a writer and designer.

St. Andre said that Interplay wanted to make a best-seller that would elevate the team's reputation. He said that the story-writing process took more than a year, mostly due to feeding various scenarios into the game to see how it would react. According to St. Andre, he and Stackpole wanted to create something new with the story.

The original plot was supposed to be similar to Red Dawn, with Russians occupying the United States and fighting against Americans engaged in liberating their nation. St. Andre eventually decided to change this and pitched a new story involving killer robots wanting to wipe out and replace humanity, calling it a sort of cross between The Terminator and Daffy Duck, with Fargo accepting this new storyline. The game's location was chosen due to St. Andre's familiarity with the area and ability to ensure the locations of real-world places were accurate in the game.

=== Release ===
The game was copyrighted in 1986. Close to release, Interplay insisted that it be labeled PG-13. Wasteland was originally released in 1988 for the Apple II, Commodore 64, and IBM compatibles. Wasteland was re-released as part of Interplay's 10 Year Anthology: Classic Collection in 1995, and also included in the 1998 Ultimate RPG Archives through Interplay's DragonPlay label.

== Reception ==
Wasteland sold approximately 250,000 units on release.

Throughout the 1980s and 1990s, Computer Gaming World lauded Wasteland for its gameplay, plot, problem solving, skills system, non-player characters, and the moral dilemmas players face. The magazine named Wasteland the Adventure Game of the Year in 1988. In 1994, the magazine cited Wasteland as an example of how "older, less sophisticated engines can still play host to a great game".

Orson Scott Card gave Wasteland a mixed review in Compute!, commending the science fiction elements and setting, but stating that it lacked a meaningful overarching story. However, James Trunzo praised the game in the November 1988 issue of Compute!, citing its non-linear design and multiple puzzle solutions, the vague nature of the goal, and customizable player stats.

In Issue 11 of Gateways, Keith Post commented, "I greatly enjoyed playing Wasteland. After playing a great many fantasy games, it was a nice change of pace to be using laser cannons instead of bows and arrow and flamethrowers in place of fireballs." "

Julia Martin's review for Challenge favorably recommended the game for those into RPGs and adventure games, comparing it to Twilight: 2000, praising its combat system, choices and for differing from the usual sword-and-spells fantasy genre. She criticized having to insert the primary "A" disk in order to play the game after copying it from four disks, the game's save system, and characters starting out with useless items.

In 2000, Wasteland was ranked as the 24th-best PC game of all time by the staff of IGN for its innovations.

According to a retrospective review by Richard Cobbett of Eurogamer in 2012, "even now, it offers a unique RPG world and experience ... a whole fallen civilisation full of puzzles and characters and things to twiddle with, all magically crammed into less than a megabyte of space." In another retrospective article that same year, IGN's Kristan Reed wrote that "time has not been kind to Wasteland, but its core concepts stand firm."

== Legacy ==
=== Sequels and spiritual successor ===
Wasteland was followed in 1990 by a less-successful intended sequel, Fountain of Dreams, set in post-war Florida. The game neither contained any of the code from Wasteland nor involved any of the staff that worked on it. Electronic Arts eventually decided to downplay its connection to Wasteland, and said it was not a sequel in 2003. Interplay worked on Meantime, which was advertised as a spiritual successor to Wasteland and did not take place in the same universe. Coding of Meantime was nearly finished and a beta version was produced, but the game was canceled as the Apple II market declined.

Interplay has described the first Fallout game as the spiritual successor to Wasteland. According to IGN, "Interplay's inability to prise the Wasteland brand name from EA's gnarled fingers actually led to it creating Fallout in the first place." There are Wasteland homage elements in Fallout and Fallout 2 as well.

Fargo's inXile Entertainment acquired the rights to the franchise from Electronic Arts in 2003. The studio developed and published Wasteland 2 in 2014. The game's production team included original Wasteland designers Alan Pavlish, Michael Stackpole, Ken St. Andre and Liz Danforth, and was crowdfunded through a Kickstarter campaign. In 2016, inXile announced a crowdfunding campaign via Fig to develop Wasteland 3. It was released in August 2020.

=== Re-release ===
In an August 2013 Kickstarter update for Wasteland 2, project lead Chris Keenan announced that they had reached an agreement with Electronic Arts to release the original Wasteland for modern operating systems. He added that it will be given for free to backers of Wasteland 2 on Kickstarter, in addition to being made available for purchase on GOG and Steam. The re-release was designed to run on higher resolutions and added a song by Mark Morgan, higher resolution portraits, the ability to use the original game's manual in-game and the paragraph book's text, and expanded the save-game functionality.

In November, Keenan announced that the re-release titled Wasteland 1: The Original Classic had gone gold, and had been submitted to GOG and Steam for approval. In response to the player feedback, inXile included the ability to turn off smoothing, including the manual in tooltips, swapping and tweaking portraits while making it work on Mac OS X and Linux. Those who backed Torment: Tides of Numenera and received Wasteland 2, also received the re-release for free.

The Original Classic edition was released on November 8, 2013, and was downloaded more than 33,000 times before its general availability. On November 12, the game was released on GOG. The next day, the game was also released on Steam for Windows, Mac and Linux. On March 11, 2014, it was released for Desura.

=== Remaster ===
inXile Entertainment announced a remastered version in honor of the original's 30th anniversary, to be produced by Krome Studios. During E3 2019, Brian Fargo announced it was coming to both Windows and Xbox One. He also released screenshots of the game. On January 23, 2020, the release date was revealed as February 25. It was released by inXile Entertainment on GOG, Steam and Microsoft Store for Windows, OS X and Linux; the Xbox One version was published by Xbox Game Studios. The graphics and sounds were completely overhauled and the game uses 3D models. In addition, it features voiced lines and new portraits for characters. The "remastered" edition also includes cross-save support and Xbox Play Anywhere support. Similar to how the game's original release received a "PG-13" content warning sticker, the remastered release was rated Teen by the ESRB.
