= Meantime (video game) =

Cancelled role-playing game

Meantime was a cancelled role-playing video game originally intended for the Apple II and possibly for the Commodore 64. It was a follow-up to 1988's Wasteland, produced by Interplay, using the same engine as Wasteland. Brian Fargo (head of Interplay at the time) halted development for this platform, in part due to the falling 8-bit computer market. Later attempts were made to finish the game for MS-DOS, but the project was canceled for good after the release of the competing Ultima VII, as it was felt they would be releasing a graphically inferior product.

== Plot and gameplay ==
Although set in the same universe as Wasteland, and with similar engine and gameplay (although it was reported that the game was supposed to use a combat system similar to Champions of Krynn), Meantime was to feature an entirely unique storyline. The basic premise was that the player would travel through time, and recruit famous historical figures to the player's party. For example, Amelia Earhart joins the party when she is rescued from a Japanese prison camp, and Wernher von Braun does when he is helped to escape the Soviets at the end of World War II. Each character would also have a particular specialty; Cyrano de Bergerac, for example, would have an expert fencing skill. The party would attempt to repair damage caused by a similar party of time-traveling villains, attempting to alter the course of history by influencing events.

== Development ==
As for us, I didn't have the rights. I'd already had all the tools and systems in place to do something skill-based, top-down, tactical. But I couldn't do Wasteland. So we thought "Let's do something else. Let's do a time-travel sort of game." Of course, this all really hurt our brains because when you start thinking about cause and effect, and you're travelling backwards and forwards in time, your head starts exploding. We put a year to a year and a half into Meantime, and I still love the idea, but it just didn't get the momentum and we ended up killing the project. It was Fallout that became a spiritual successor and there were so many similarities.

— Brian Fargo

The work on the game was first reported in the press in early 1989. The Meantime design team include people from the Wasteland. The project was initially led by Alan Pavlish; also involved were Mark O'Green and Liz Danforth. Unlike Wasteland, a map editor was created for the game, preventing the need to know assembly code when creating game areas. When the maps used in the game were around 75% done, Liz Danforth left the project. This, coupled with declining Apple II sales, led Brian Fargo to cancel the game.

The Meantime project was revived around 1992 under the lead of Bill Dugan, with the aim of bringing the game to IBM PC-compatibles. A contractor was hired to port the program to MS-DOS, and an Interplay employee began work on EGA graphics for use in the game. By this time the code was considered "ancient", causing porting to be very difficult. Bill Dugan finally recommended the cancellation of the project, after seeing the advanced (at the time) graphics of Ultima VII. It was felt that Meantime had little to offer, with its top-down perspective and lack of animation.

The box cover was never made public, but is said to feature Albert Einstein, who was a playable character in the game. In 1996, Computer Gaming World ranked it as the sixth top vaporware title in computer game history.

== Legacy ==
The Meantime code and rights were owned entirely by Interplay, as opposed to Wasteland, which was owned by Electronic Arts. As such, EA started from scratch when they produced their own sequel to Wasteland, Fountain of Dreams, but in 2003 dropped all claims that the game had any connection to Wasteland. When Interplay finally did create their spiritual successor to Wasteland, Fallout, none of the Meantime code was used and the only Meantime designer involved in the creation of Fallout was Mark O'Green.

No copies of the source code are believed to exist. Attempts at recovery were thwarted by the games' design requiring a fresh copy of the master disk for each gaming session, an outdated concept that sometimes caused the original game disk to be accidentally saved over and lost.

Chiptune artist 8 Bit Weapon released an EP titled MeanTime EP as a tribute to the game on August 7, 2007.

A trademark was filed for "Meantime" on November 11, 2014, by Roxy Friday LLC, a company associated with inXile Entertainment, authors of Wasteland 2.
