= Stasis (video game) =

2015 video game

- Developer: The Brotherhood
- Publishers: The Brotherhood; Daedalic Entertainment; Feardemic
- Producer: Nicolas Bischoff
- Designer: Christopher Bischoff
- Composers: Mark Morgan; Daniel Sadowski
- Platforms: Windows, OS X, Linux, PlayStation 4, PlayStation 5
- Release: Windows, OS X; 31 August 2015; Linux; 22 June 2017; Playstation 4/5; 26 June 2025
- Genre: Graphic adventure
- Mode: Single-player

Stasis is a 2015 science fiction horror point-and-click adventure game developed by The Brotherhood. Viewed from an isometric perspective, the game requires interactions with computers, combining items and puzzle solving. The game was released on 31 August 2015 for Windows and OS X, and in June 2017 for Linux.

The game centers around the main character John Maracheck who awakes from Stasis aboard an abandoned spaceship. Maracheck must unravel the mysteries aboard the spaceship Groomlake to find his missing wife and daughter, before the spaceship plunges further into Neptune's methane clouds.

The game has been compared with the science fiction horror film, Event Horizon, and the psychological horror adventure game Sanitarium.

== Plot ==
John, his wife Ellen and daughter Rebecca are put into cryogenic stasis bound for Titan. John awakens alone aboard the Groomlake, finding the whole crew dead. Exploring the ship he learns that it is a medical frigate run by the Cayne Corporation for illegal research on unwilling victims. His primary companion is scientist Te'ah, who contacts him by radio. From a variety of PDAs he learns that senior scientist Dr. Malan created project SEED, designed to create supersoldiers by reactivating dormant human genes through torturous experimentation and forced impregnations, resulting in the creation of animalistic and vicious mutant humans referred to as 'hybrids'. Several of these hybrids escaped and butchered the crew, skinning them for their subdermal tags to allow them to roam the ship freely. Concurrently, a ravenous fungus and insect infestation crippled numerous ship systems. John is eventually captured by Malan, who kills his daughter in revenge for John sabotaging the ship's oxygen gardens.

Reaching the escape deck, John shatters a portal and vents Dr. Malan into space, before falling and breaking his leg. Reluctantly, Te'ah acknowledges she engineered the hybrids' escape and destruction of the Groomlake, in order to find Ellen, in whose bone marrow Te'ah has implanted genetic material containing all of Malan's research, which Te'ah plans to sell in vengeance against Cayne Corporation for the murder of her husband. John tricks the ship security systems into killing Te'ah, ruining the last stasis pod in the process. John reprograms the escape shuttle to take his wife away from the ship. In an epilogue, it appears Ellen has been dead all along.

== Gameplay ==
The game adopts the classic point-and-click system to allow interactions with the environment and utilises PDA data to help unravel aspects of the story.

== Music ==
The game's soundtrack has been composed by Mark Morgan, with additional by Daniel Sadowski.

== Development ==
The game was part funded through a Kickstarter crowdfunding campaign, raising $132,523 in December 2013. By that time, the game had already been in development for three years by The Brotherhood, a three-man team based in South Africa. This allowed for an alpha demo of the game to be released alongside the campaign.

In an interview with IGN, Stasis creator Chris Bischoff cited elements from films Alien and Event Horizon, as well as Dead Space, as inspirations for the work. A beta was launched on 8 August 2015 for backers. The game was officially released for Windows and OS X on 31 August 2015 and for Linux in June 2017.

Cayne, a prequel to Stasis, was released for free in January 2017.

Stasis: Bone Totem, a sequel to the game, was released in May 2023 to generally favourable reviews.

Versions for the Playstation 4 & 5 consoles was released on 26 June 2025.

== Reception ==
Reception

Aggregate score
Aggregator	Score
Metacritic	79/100

The game received generally positive reviews, with a score of 79 out of 100 on Metacritic. Rock Paper Shotgun was positive towards the game in their review, saying "Despite some characterisation wobbles and a somewhat perfunctory final mile, STASIS is the best adventure game I've played in years. It's also one of the most impressive horror games I've played lately." Destructoid awarded it 8.5 out of 10, saying "STASIS is a game that is not to be missed by anyone craving an eerie and sinister experience." IGN Africa awarded it 9 out of 10, saying "The Brotherhood's debut game is as brilliant as it is profoundly disturbing."
