= Liz Danforth =

American illustrator, editor, writer and scenario designer

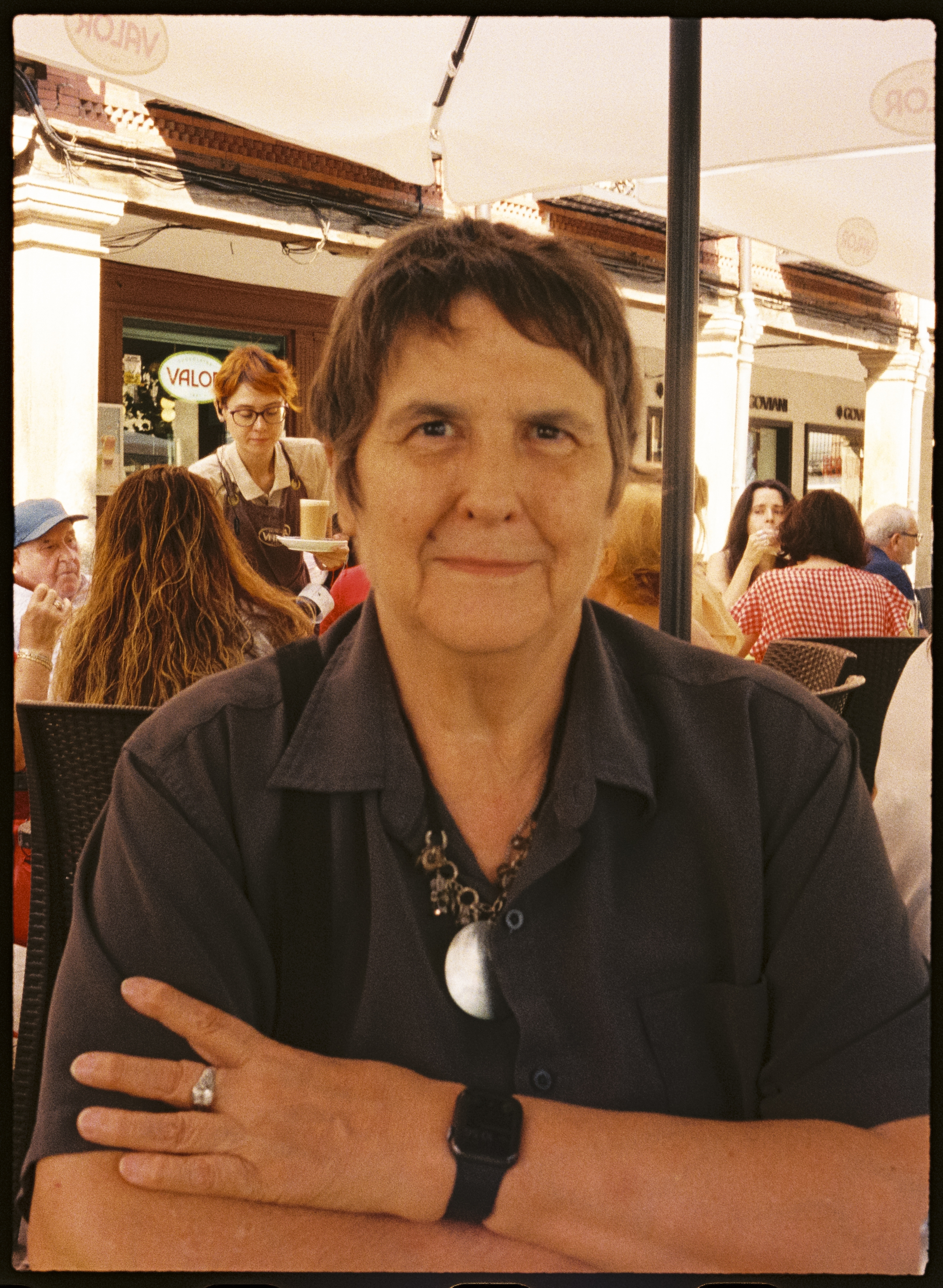
- Danforth during her 2025 visit to Spain
- Born: 1953 (age 72–73)
- Known for: Fantasy art Science fiction art Role-playing games Video games Tabletop game design

Elizabeth T. Danforth (born 1953) is an illustrator, editor, writer, and scenario designer for collectible card games, role-playing games and video games. She has worked in the game industry continuously since the mid 1970s.

== Early life and education ==
She received her BA in Anthropology from Arizona State University, and her MLS from the University of Arizona.

== Creative work ==
Flying Buffalo hired Danforth as a staff artist and for production work in 1978, and published her magazine Sorcerer's Apprentice (1978–1983) for 17 issues. While employed with Flying Buffalo, Danforth is noted for editing and developing the Fifth Edition of Flying Buffalo's flagship role playing game, Tunnels & Trolls. She reprised this role in 2013 for the new edition, Deluxe Tunnels & Trolls.

Danforth is known primarily as a freelance artist in the fantasy and science fiction genres, with the majority of her body of work illustrating for the game industry. She has created book covers, maps, and illustrations for many of the significant game publishers including Wizards of the Coast, TSR, Inc, Alderac Entertainment Group, FASA Corporation, Iron Crown Enterprises, GDW, and more. She produced 36 pieces of art for the early released sets of the collectible card game Magic: The Gathering (produced by Wizards of the Coast), several of which were re-released in subsequent editions and box sets. She has created additional card art for other card games, including the Middle-earth Collectible Card Game, Legend of the Five Rings, and continues to create new works for Sorcery: Contested Realm (produced by Erik's Curiosa Limited). Her maps and illustrations appear in novels and anthologies from Bantam Spectra, Tor Books, DAW Books, and St Martin's Press.

She has freelanced for the computer game industry, developing scenarios for Wasteland, Wasteland 2, and two licensed Star Trek computer games from Interplay. She worked on Interplay's Meantime which was never released. She was the lead developer for New World Computing's Tunnels & Trolls computer game, and worked on projects with Electronic Arts.

At the 1995 Origins Awards, held in July 1996, Danforth was inducted into the Academy of Gaming Arts and Design's Hall of Fame. The Academy is the creative arm of GAMA, the Game Manufacturer's Association. She is a lifetime member of ASFA, the Association of Science Fiction and Fantasy Artists. In 2014, she was chosen by vote as a "famous game designer" to be featured as the king of hearts in Flying Buffalo's 2014 Famous Game Designers Playing Card Deck.

Danforth has been guest of honor at numerous science fiction conventions over the past 30 years, including Cascadia Con, the North American Science Fiction Convention held in Seattle in 2005, and as Artist Guest of Honor at TusCon 52 in 2025.

Danforth continues to do art and illustration in a freelance capacity.

== Academic work ==
Danforth completed a master's degree in Information and Library Science (University of Arizona, 2008), and was one of a dozen hand-selected "gaming experts" who participated in the American Library Association's million-dollar grant-funded project to explore how gaming can be used to improve problem-solving and literacy skills, and to develop a model gaming "toolbox" for gaming in libraries. Ten libraries nationwide were selected to receive a onetime grant of $5,000 with funds used to expand on or add literacy-based gaming experiences at the library for youth ages 10–18.

From May 2009 to December 2011, Danforth wrote the "Games, Gamers and Gaming" blog and column for Library Journal as an advocate and popularizer of games in libraries. She speaks at professional and fan conferences, and at libraries on gaming-related topics. Based in Arizona, she continues to do freelance art and writing.

== Bibliography ==
=== Role-Playing Games ===
- 1979 — Tunnels & Trolls Fifth Edition (Flying Buffalo Inc): Editor, Developer, Illustrator
- 1984 — Middle-earth Role Playing Game
- 1994 — Elminster's Ecologies
- 1994 — Marco Volo: Departure
- 1994 — Marco Volo: Journey
- 1994 — Marco Volo: Arrival
- 2015 — Tunnels & Trolls Deluxe Rulebook: Writer and Artist
- 2023 — The Fantasy Trip: Artist for Rose Labyrinth Roleplaying Game Adventure Set

=== Video games ===
- 1988 — Wasteland (Interplay): Scenario Designer
- 1989 — Meantime (Interplay, unpublished)
- 1990 — Crusaders of Khazan (New World Computing): Lead Writer/Designer
- 1992 — Star Trek: 25th Anniversary (Interplay): Scenario Designer
- 1993 — Star Trek: Judgment Rites (Interplay): Scenario Designer
- 1995 — Though This be Madness (Star Trek: Judgment Rites)
- 2013 — Wasteland 2 (in collaboration with inXile Entertainment): Artist and Scenario Designer

=== Books / Novels / Publications (Maps & Illustrations) ===
- 1978 — The Silver Eel: Illustration
- 1980 — Dragonfields: Illustration
- 1980 — Dragonfields #3: Illustration
- 1983 — Dragonfields #4: Illustration
- 1984 — The Song of Homana (Chronicles of the Cheysuli series by Jennifer Roberson): Map
- 1986 — Sword-Dancer (Sword Dancer Saga by Jennifer Roberson): Map
- 1986 — Cheysuli series by Jennifer Roberson (DAW Books): Maps/Illustrations
- 1986–1996 — Various Issues: Challenge: GDW's Magazine of Adventure Gaming: Illustration
- 1987 — Should Old Acquaintance (Fantasy Book, March 1987): Illustration
- 1988 — Sword-Singer (Sword Dancer Saga by Jennifer Roberson): Map
- 1997 — Spirit Gate (Crossroads series by Kate Elliott, Tor Books): Map
- 1998 — Sword-Born (Sword Dancer Saga by Jennifer Roberson): Map
- 1998 — Eyes of Silver by Michael Stackpole: Maps
- 1999 — The Dark Glory War (DragonCrown War Cycle by Michael Stackpole): Map
- 2001 — Fortress Draconis (DragonCrown War Cycle by Michael Stackpole): Map
- 2001 — Legacy of the Wolf: Omnibus Two (Chronicles of the Cheysuli by Jennifer Roberson): Map
- 2002 — When Dragons Rage (DragonCrown War Cycle by Michael Stackpole): Map
- 2003 — The Grand Crusade (DragonCrown War Cycle by Michael Stackpole): Map
- 2004 — Irish Country series by Patrick Taylor: Maps
- 2010 — Middle Earth Lyssa (Art Evolution Project from Black Gate): Illustration

=== Collectible Card Games ===
- 1995 — Legend of the Five Rings Collectible Card Game (Alderac Entertainment): Card Artist
- 1994-2006 Various Releases (Magic: the Gathering): Illustration
- 2019–Present — Sorcery: Contested Realm Card Artist

=== Anthologies / Short Stories ===
- 1990 — Striper in Into the Shadows Anthology: Illustration
- 1990 — Would It Help to Say I'm Sorry? in Into the Shadows Anthology: Illustration
- 1990 — Graverobbers in Into the Shadows Anthology: Short Fiction
- 1992 — Mage's Blood & Old Bones: Short Fiction
- 1992 — Imp-Possible Situations: Short Fiction
- 1997 — Highwaymen: Robbers and Rogues (DAW Books): Illustrator
- 2005 — Northwest Passages: A Cascadian Anthology: Illustration
- 2008 — Imp Possible Situations in Of Dice and Pen Anthology: Author : Short Story
- 1984 — A Little Mermaid on the Star Worts (World Fantasy Convention): Illustration
- 1984 — Tanith Lee (World Fantasy Convention): Illustration
- 1985 — Chelsea Quinn Yarbro: Bibliography (World Tales): Illustration

=== Miscellaneous / Other ===
- 2022 — Learn Magic Read a Book (Steve Jackson Games): T-Shirt Design
