= The Demon's Forge =

1981 video game

- Publishers: Saber Software; Mastertronic (IBM PC)
- Designer: Brian Fargo
- Platforms: Apple II, IBM PC
- Release: 1981
- Genre: Adventure

The Demon's Forge is an adventure game published in 1981 by Saber Software for the Apple II and IBM PC. It was designed by Brian Fargo.

== Gameplay ==
The Demon's Forge is a game in which the player is a mercenary banished to a dungeon.

In this game, players navigate through a fantasy world filled with danger and puzzles. The goal is to explore dungeons, solve mysteries, and ultimately confront the demonic forces lurking within.

The game's interface relies heavily on text commands, where players type out actions and responses to interact with the game world. Through this approach, players uncover a rich narrative and encounter various challenges, from battling monsters to deciphering cryptic clues.

Fargo's design emphasizes immersive storytelling and strategic decision-making, typical of early text adventure games. The Demon's Forge is known for its atmospheric descriptions and inventive puzzles, which require both wit and courage to overcome. The game's legacy lies in its contribution to the evolution of adventure games and its influence on later role-playing and the former genre.

== Reception ==
Michael Cranford, a co-developer, reviewed the game for Computer Gaming World, and stated that "I enjoyed The Demon's Forge and, on the whole, would recommend it to anyone."
