= Zork: Grand Inquisitor =

1997 video game

- Developer: Activision (Note: Ported to Mac OS by Logicware.)
- Publisher: Activision (Note: Mac OS port published by MacPlay.)
- Director: Laird M. Malamed
- Producer: Elizabeth Storz
- Designer: Margaret Stohl
- Programmers: Mason Deming; Michael H. Douglas
- Artist: David Dalzell
- Composers: Mark Morgan; John Beal
- Platforms: Windows, Macintosh
- Release: Windows: NA: November 4, 1997; EU: 1997; Macintosh: NA: October 19, 2001
- Genre: Graphic adventure
- Modes: Single-player, multiplayer

Zork: Grand Inquisitor is a graphic adventure game developed and published by Activision, and released for Windows in 1997; a second edition for Macintosh was released in 2001. The game is the twelfth in the Zork series, and builds upon both this and the Enchanter series of interactive fiction video games originally released by Infocom. The game's story focuses on the efforts of a salesperson who becomes involved in restoring magic to Zork while thwarting the plots of a tyrannical figure seeking to stop this. The game features the performances of Erick Avari, Michael McKean, Amy D. Jacobson, Marty Ingels, Earl Boen, Jordana Capra, Dirk Benedict, David Lander and Rip Taylor.

The game was a modest commercial success and received generally favorable reviews, many praising the game for returning to the roots of the series following Zork Nemesis. A promotional prequel titled Zork: The Undiscovered Underground was released with the game, written by one of the original creators of the series, alongside a poster portraying the chronology of the series.

== Gameplay ==
Zork: Grand Inquisitor is conducted from a first-person perspective within each of the game's pre-rendered locations (dubbed "Z-Vision"), which allows full exploration of the majority of locations with a 360 degree view; in other locations the view is fixed, while some sites allow the view to look above and below their position. Like Zork Nemesis, players use their cursor to interact with the environment, including examining items, picking up and using objects and moving between locations. At times, the player will also assume the role of one of three supporting characters to explore additional locations. If the player conducts an action or mistake that is fatal, the game cuts to a computer terminal on which the player's fatal action and its consequences appear in prose form, much in the fashion of the original Zork trilogy, complete with a score and the player's rank.

The inventory system allows players to examine items they collect, as well as making use of spells to solve puzzles - many of those found are maintained in a spellbook, while others are single use, with several originating from the Zork and Enchanter games. Quick-use menus for spells and inventory items are also available for use by the player to find what they need.

== Story ==
=== Setting ===
Zork: Grand Inquisitor takes place within the fantasy world of Zork, across the kingdom of Quendor and the Great Underground Empire, and is set 120 years after the events of Zork Nemesis (which contains small references to it in the story); though several centuries before Return to Zork. Like most Zork games, Grand Inquisitor employs humour in its adventure, and makes frequent use of parody, containing numerous references to staples and clichés of the traditional adventure genre.

100 years before the game begins, magic began to disappear from Zork, leading to an advancement in technology. Leading this development is the Inquisition - a powerful group who have established control over Quendor, eliminating all vestiges of magic. Any violation their rules, no matter how trivial, automatically leads to "totemization" - a process that involves a machine called a Totemizer, which imprisons any living creature sent into it within a steel can called a "totem" for eternity. By the beginning of the game, the Inquisition is in full control of Quendor, and is preparing to eliminate magic for good.

=== Characters ===
- The Player or "AFGNCAAP" - A Frobozz Electric "PermaSuck" vacuum cleaner salesperson. The name Dalboz gives them is the abbreivation of "Ageless, Faceless, Gender-Neutral, Culturally Ambiguous Adventure Person".
- Dalboz of Gurth (voiced by Michael McKean) - The former Dungeon Master of the Underground, and the player's guide through much of the game.
- Mir Yannick (portrayed by Erick Avari) - Grand Inquistor of the Magic Inquistion, who favors technology over magic.
- Y'Gael (portrayed by Jordana Capra) - The Lost Enchantress of the Empire, who desires to see magic return and the fall of the Inquisition.
- Antharia Jack (portrayed by Dirk Benedict) - A famous actor and adventurer, parodying the character of Indiana Jones.
- Lucy Flathead (portrayed by Amy D. Jacobson) - A descendant of the Flathead family, gifted with the ability to read minds.
- Griff (voiced by Marty Ingels) - A member of a small, timid, and cowardly species of dragon.
- Brog (voiced by Earl Boen) - A member of a small, troll-like species that are strong but lack intelligence.

=== Plot ===
Grand Inquisitor begins with the Player arriving in Port Foozle one evening, after the Inquisition "liberates" it and imposes a nightly curfew. Noticing a glow coming from the docks, the Player finds a lantern and takes it to a local pawn shop owned by Antharia Jack. Intrigued, he attempts to check it out, only to confiscate it when he discovers it has magic within/ After framing Jack for arson, the Player recovers the lantern, finding its magic is actually the imprisoned soul of Dalboz, the former Dungeon Master of the Great Underground. Seeking safety, Dalboz instructs the Player to head into the Underground, revealing to them that he needs their help to restore magic to the world, and to stop Mir Yannick, the Grand Inquisitor. Lost Enchantress Y'Gael contacts the pair upon them entering the Underground, handing them a spellbook to help on their quest.

During their exploration, the Player visits the magic school of G.U.E. Tech, where they learn Yannick's dislike of magic is due to his inability to master it. They also learn from recordings made by the school's headmaster that magic can be restored to Zork through the power of three artifacts that went missing: the Cube of Foundation (representing Middle Magic), the Coconut of Quendor (representing High Magic), and the Skull of Yoruk (representing Deep Magic). Exploring the Underground further, they find three totems carrying the spirits of three beings: Griff, a cowardly, small dragon; Brog, a dim-witted but strong, small troll-like creature; and Lucy Flathead, a mind-reader and former magic resistance member. All three are sent through time tunnels to travel back into the past and recover the missing artifacts. During her trip to Foozle's past, Lucy grows attached to Antharia Jack, who in turn falls in love with her but curses his luck when she is forced to leave the past.

In the present, Jack - who is saved from totemization by the player's actions - is approached by Yannick, who fakes an emotional breakdown in order to trick him into revealing where the Player is. The Inquisition swiftly captures the Player, throwing them in jail in Foozle. Jack, regretting his actions, aids the Player in recovering their gear, whereupon they escape with the help of Dalboz's magical Living Castle to get to Flathead Mesa, where Yannick is preparing to unleash a new piece of technology called "Inquizivision", which will brainwash everyone in Quendor. Y'Gael soon contacts the Player, revealing they must place the recovered artifacts on the Inquisition radio tower. After placing the artifacts upon the tower, with Dalboz ensuring the Coconut remains stable, the Player casts a powerful spell to fuse the three levels of magic stored in the artifacts, moments before Yannick can stop them.

The resulting magical blast destroys the tower, freeing the totemized spirits from their imprisonment, and sending Yannick to his death. Now freed from her imprisonment, Lucy shares an intimate moment with Jack, before assuming her rightful place as the new ruler of Quendor, announcing the return of magic. The game ends with Lucy naming the player as Dalboz's successor as Dungeon Master, whilst giving an explanation to Jack about time travel.

== Development ==
Zork: Grand Inquisitor was announced on January 22, 1997, with a release date set for fall of that year. It was developed on an enhanced version of the Zork Nemesis game engine. In something of a return to the series' roots, the game in rough form was written in Inform (a programming language for text adventures) before work started on the graphics, while Marc Blank, part of the original Zork team, was commissioned to create an original text adventure game, Zork: The Undiscovered Underground, to be included as a free promotion for Grand Inquisitor.

The music for the game was composed by John Everett Beal and Mark Morgan, while the game's design was handled by Margaret Stohl. The Macintosh port was developed by MacPlay. Zork: Grand Inquisitor was one of the first computer games to include true closed captioning so that the hearing impaired could play without missing any of the sound effects and spoken dialog in the game. The original release included a feelie poster with a timeline of the history of Zork up until the events of the game, with pictures and short descriptions of major events, including the backstory of some of the characters; this encompasses all released Zork games except Return to Zork, which takes place 580 years after Zork: Grand Inquisitor.

== Reception ==
Reception

Aggregate score
| Aggregator | Score |
|---|---|
| GameRankings | 72% |

Review scores
| Publication | Score |
|---|---|
| Adventure Gamers | 4.5/5 |
| Computer Games Strategy Plus | 4/5 |
| Computer and Video Games | 3/5 |
| Edge | 8/10 |
| GameRevolution | B |
| GameSpot | 8/10 |
| Next Generation | 4/5 |
| PC Gamer (UK) | 84% |
| PC Gamer (US) | 88% |
| PC Zone | 88% |

According to Matt Barton of Gamasutra, "Zork: Grand Inquisitor did not sell as many copies as Activision hoped." The game received "average" reviews according to the review aggregation website GameRankings.

GameSpot said, "Compact and unspectacular as it is, Zork: Grand Inquisitor is a model of adventure gaming as good entertainment. Many of the genre's conventions (FMV, item hunting, absurdist humor) get polished to a high sheen here. It is funny and reflexive without being geeky or pointlessly ironic. The third-string actors exploit their comic trademarks to good effect. Real attention is paid to the pacing of the whole affair, so there are no overly quiet dead zones of tedious activity. And the puzzles are fun to solve rather than gratuitous brain-teasing exercises." Adventure Classic Gaming said, "One of the more distinguished, entertaining games of the last several years, Zork Grand Inquisitor is light and amusing (and in some places, very funny). It strikes a good balance between its tone and subject matter. [...] Overall, Zork Grand Inquisitor is the best looking game among the next generation titles of the Zork series. While it is a very good adventure, it is not a very good Zork." Destructoid wrote an article about it in the site's Games Time Forgot series, commenting "Not only is Zork: Grand Inquisitor a clever, well-written adventure game, but it's also one of the most singularly rewarding games a fan of Zork could ever play."

Next Generation stated that "Overall, Inquisitor is definitely a step up for the series and puts Zork back on the right track after a serious stumble with Nemesis. Hopefully, this will continue. Well done." A brief review in GamePro commented, "The graphics look gorgeous (unless they're animated), plus there are plenty of inside jokes and a good sense of self-mocking humor, delivered crisply by Tinseltown talent. The interface is a dream, and believe it or not, the game supports multiplayer for joint brain power."

Zork: Grand Inquisitor was a runner-up for Computer Gaming World's 1997 "Adventure Game of the Year" award, which ultimately went to The Curse of Monkey Island. The editors called Grand Inquisitor "a wonderful return to form, with the best humor this side of Monkey Island." Similarly, the Computer Game Developers Conference nominated Grand Inquisitor for its 1998 "Best Adventure/RPG" Spotlight Award, but this went ultimately to Final Fantasy VII. It was also nominated for "Most Innovative Game Design", but lost to PaRappa the Rapper.

=== Legacy ===
Two sequels to Zork: Grand Inquisitor were announced in August 1997. According to the staff of PC Gamer US, the games would "continue the adventure and round out the series as the final two installments in a new Zork adventure trilogy."

In 2011, Adventure Gamers named Grand Inquisitor the 12th-best adventure game ever released.

== See also ==
- The Space Bar
- Legends of Zork, the next game in the series
