= Robot Cache =

Spanish video game company

Robot Cache, S.L.
- Type: Private
- Industry: Video games
- Founded: January 16, 2018; 8 years ago
- Founder: Brian Fargo
- Defunct: May 4, 2026; 6 months ago
- Headquarters: San Diego County, California, United States
- Key people: Lee Jacobson (CEO); Mark Caldwell (CTO)
- Website: robotcache.com

Robot Cache, S.L. was a video game company established to allow for digital buying and selling of video games. It was founded in January 2018 by Brian Fargo, and reached open beta in May 2020. It shut down on the 4th of May 2026.

== History ==
Robot Cache was founded in January 2018 by Brian Fargo, the founder of InXile Entertainment. Lee Jacobson serves at the chief executive officer, and Mark Caldwell as the chief technology officer. Laura Naviaux Sturr, formerly of Daybreak, was CMO and COO in 2018 and 2019, leaving for Amazon Game Studios.

Robot Cache had originally planned on a $15 million initial coin offering, however after the SEC had changed regulation regarding the issuance of such cryptocurrencies, the company converted the investors to a traditional SEC Reg-D Securities Offering an abandoned issuing any cryptocurrency altogether.

The company ultimately raised approximately $10.5 million in its initial round, $3 million of which was from shares issued by one of its initial early investors Millenium Blockchain, which was also converted into equity shares along with the other early investors. In December 2019, AMD and Robot Cache formed a joint marketing partnership to collaborate on various blockchain and gaming initiatives.

On May 12, 2020, Robot Cache launched as an open beta. In April 2026, it was announced that Robot Cache would shut down within 30 days.
