= Zork Nemesis =

1996 video game

Zork Nemesis: The Forbidden Lands
- Developers: Zombie LLC, Activision
- Publisher: Activision
- Director: Cecilia Barajas
- Producer: Cecilia Barajas
- Designers: Cecilia Barajas; Mark Long
- Programmers: Michael H. Douglas; Paul Gallagher; Ben Diamand; Gary Jesdanun; Andrew G. Silber; David Chien; Mason Deming; Edward Clune; Ted Huntington; Brian Dean Jennings
- Artists: Mauro Borrelli; Scott Goffman; Jack Burton
- Writers: Cecilia Barajas; Nick Sagan; Adam Simon
- Composer: Mark Morgan
- Platforms: Windows 95, MS-DOS, Macintosh
- Release: PC: NA: March 25, 1996; UK: April 11, 1996; Macintosh; 1996
- Genre: Graphic adventure
- Mode: Single-player

Zork Nemesis: The Forbidden Lands is a graphic adventure game, developed by Zombie LLC, published by Activision, and released in 1996 for Windows 95, MS-DOS, and Macintosh. It is the eleventh game in the Zork series, and is the first title not to be marketed under the Infocom label. It is the second Zork game by Activision after Return to Zork (1993).

The story, which is darker and less comical than previous Zork games, focuses on players investigating the sudden disappearance of four prominent figures and their children at the hands of a mysterious being known as the "Nemesis", uncovering a sinister plot during their investigations that they must thwart. The game's live-action cast included Lauren Koslow, W. Morgan Sheppard, Allan Kolman, Stephen Macht, Paul Anthony Stewart, Merle Kennedy, and Bruce Nozick.

The game received favorable reviews, despite some criticism of the puzzles and lack of relevance to the Zork setting, and won the 1996 Spotlight Award for "Best Prerendered Art". The game was later re-released by GOG to be compatible with later Windows editions.

The next game in the series, Zork: Grand Inquisitor, was released in 1997.

== Gameplay ==
Zork Nemesis operates from a first-person perspective and uses a simple point-and-click system. The cursor fundamentally allows for interaction with the player's surrounding, changing to symbolize what can be done; a bronze arrows for movement between locations or for changing view angles; a gold arrow for interaction with objects; and a hand icon for objects that can be picked up, or highlight where collected objects can be used. Each location, ranging from corridors, small rooms, and vast halls, can be viewed in panoramic 360-degree to find objects to examine and interact with, with a still screen used when zooming in to examine an object in more detail (i.e. a book). Items collected by the player are stored in a simple inventory that be cycled through with the right mouse-button.

Puzzles in the game generally require the player to find clues that will help them solve it, with puzzles being solved by either finding the right objects to use on them, or finding the right combination of actions to trigger an effect; a score system mostly denotes when a player has completed a section of the game's story.

== Story ==
=== Setting ===
The game takes place in the fantasy world of Zork, in a region called the Forbidden Lands found within the boundaries of the Great Underground Empire. The player initially is restricted to exploring an ancient temple complex called the Temple of Agrippa, but later gains access to further areas to explore: the Frigid River Branch Conservatory, a musical school and performance hall situated close to Flood Control Dam #7; Steppinthrax Monastery, an abandoned monastery that has fallen into disrepair; Grey Mountains Asylum, a mental institution in the frigid, frozen peaks of the Grey Mountains; and Castle Irondune, a military fort and private museum situated in the Irondune desert.

=== Characters ===
- Alexandria Wolfe (portrayed by Merle Kennedy) - A young woman gifted with a talent for music, who mysteriously died at the Temple of Agrippa.
- Doctor Erasmus Sartorius (portrayed by Allan Kolman) - Head of the Grey Mountains Asylum, conducting alchemical research to complete his father's work into finding the fifth alchemical element.
- Bishop Francois Malveaux (portrayed by W. Morgan Sheppard) - Head priest of the Steppinthrax Monastery, and foster father of Alexandria.
- General Thaddeus Kaine (portrayed by Stephen Macht) - Decorated army officer, serving as the commander of Castle Irondune.
- Lucien Kaine (portrayed by Paul Anthony Stewart) - A soldier based at Castle Irondune, son of Thaddeus.
- Madame Sophia Hamilton (portrayed by Lauren Koslow) - Head of the Frigid River Branch Conservatory, and Alexandria's music teacher.
- "Nemesis" (voiced by Bruce Nozick; portrayed by Paul Anthony Stewart) - A mysterious entity that took over the Temple of Agrippa, seeking out the fifth element by torturing the missing people at Agrippa.
- The Player - A nameless adventurer, charged to investigate the Forbidden Lands and the disappearance of four prominent citizens.
- Karlok Bivotar - An agent of the Empire, assigned by Syovar to the mission the Player assumes in the wake of Bivotar's death.

=== Plot ===
Vice Regent Syovar the Strong, ruler of the Great Underground Empire, assigns the Player with the task of continuing an investigation that was previously assigned to one of Syovar's agents, Karlok Bivotar. The investigation sought to uncover what happened to four prominent members of the Empire - Doctor Erasmus Sartorius, General Thaddeus Kaine, Bishop Francois Malveaux, and Madame Sophia Hamilton - and investigatage rumours of a curse across a region known as the Forbidden Lands. The Player is sent to the Temple of Agrippa, within the Forbidden Lands, where Bivotar had tracked down the missing people before dying at the hands of a being called "Nemesis". Upon arriving, they encounter the spirit of a young woman named Alexandria, who claims the temple has fallen under a great evil.

Inside the main building of the complex, the Player finds that Sartorius and the others secretly were working as alchemists, each mastering one of the four main alchemical elements - Air, Fire, Earth, and Water - and were seeking the fifth element when Nemesis killed them. Finding their elements and using them to revive them partially, the group reveal how Nemesis is seeking the fifth element, known as "the Quintessence", for their own reasons, and was responsible for not only killing them, but also Alexandria, Francois' daughter, and Thaddeus' son Lucien. Subduing Nemesis with what magical power they have, Sartorius implores the player to find the labs each created for themselves, and create their respective element's alchemical metal in order to fully restore them to life.

Visiting each location, the Player learns how the group came together. Sartorius sought to find the fifth element, continuing his father's research, but found that it required mastery of the four alchemical elements and their metals. He thus recruited the aid of Francois, Thaddeus, and Sophia, each of whom agreed to help for their own personal reasons. To achieve their aim, they found they needed the pure soul of a person born during a solar eclipse that coincided with an alignment of the planets linked to the elements. Sartorius found such a child was due to be born at his asylum, and thus separated it from the mother to be raised by Francois, the child being Alexandria. Sophia then helped educate her in music, all while secretly teaching her a musical song that would cleanse her soul when the group used her to acquire the fifth element.

Upon creating the pure metals, the group are restored, whereupon the Player learns that the Nemesis is really Lucien, who was against their plans to sacrifice Alexandria, whom he had fallen in love with. Lucien had managed to disrupt the ritual, killing the alchemists, and was seeking to revive Alexandria. Imploring the Player to prevent the ritual being completed, he hands them a gold ring, whereupon they recover another that Alexandria had. Uncovering a hidden lab beneath the temple, the Player purifies the rings to form the fifth element, powered by love, which they then use on the ritual. The fifth element kills the alchemists, destroys the temple, and revives Lucien and Alexandria back to normal, who choose to move on and live in peace, inviting the Player to join them.

== Production ==
Zork Nemesis employed technology Activision dubbed "Z-Vision Surround Technology," which gives users a simulated 360-degree view of each location visited. It was one of the first games to employ such technology, though Zork Nemesis only allows panning in either horizontal or vertical where both panning options are available, unlike in later games such as The Journeyman Project 3: Legacy of Time or Myst III: Exile. Furthermore, details were far more difficult to make out in the panoramic scenes than in the still screens; the sequel, Zork: Grand Inquisitor, made significant improvements to the Z-Vision system. Technical director Laird Malamed felt the game suffered from time constraints, saying that once the advanced game engine was completed, the team didn't have enough time left to implement anything more than simple control panel puzzles. The planned third act of the game, taking place in multiple extensive locations beneath the temple explored in the first act, including a dramatic boat journey on a black subterranean lake, was cut almost entirely, leaving three simple puzzles and two additional rooms.

Like other adventure games of its time, Zork Nemesis made use of live actors. The game features a significant amount of screen-time for the actors, thanks to its use of flashbacks at key locations (or objects) and the use of monologues in which characters address the player explaining and justifying their actions.

The game's plot was written by Cecilia Barajas, Nick Sagan and Adam Simon and is a departure from the series usual comedic treatment in its games, by featuring a much darker and less humorous story than previous games. The budget of Zork Nemesis surpassed $3 million. The live-action scenes contributed to this cost, which ultimately rose to around USD$3.5 million. The game was heavily marketed, with an estimated $1 million spent on this aspect.

== Reception ==
Reception

Aggregate score
Aggregator	Score
GameRankings	82%

Review scores
Publication	Score
Adventure Gamers	4/5
Computer Games Strategy Plus	4/5
Computer Gaming World	3/5
GameRevolution	B+
GameSpot	7.9/10
GameZone	(positive)
Next Generation	3/5
PC Gamer (US)	89%
PC Zone	65%
Entertainment Weekly	B+
PC Magazine	4/4
PC Games	A

Award
Publication	Award
PC Games	Game of the Month

The game received "favorable" reviews according to the review aggregation website GameRankings. Next Generation said, "With 3D sound and stunning graphics (the game is almost worth the price just to examine the fantastic architectural environments), this game was destined for five stars, until the puzzles – and these are what really count, to us, anyway – dragged the game back down."

Zork Nemesis placed 10th on PC Data's monthly computer game sales chart for April 1996. It secured positions 12 and 11 the following two months, respectively. By November 1996, Zork Nemesis had sold above 100,000 units. According to Activision, strong sales of the game during the 1996 holiday shopping season contributed to high revenues in the company's third quarter, which increased 78% over the third quarter of 1995.

Zork Nemesis won the 1996 Spotlight Award for "Best Prerendered Art" from the Game Developers Conference. It was also nominated for the 1996 "Adventure Game of the Year" awards of Computer Games Strategy Plus, PC Gamer, CNET Gamecenter and Computer Game Entertainment, but these went variously to The Neverhood, The Beast Within: A Gabriel Knight Mystery and The Pandora Directive. PC Gamer highlighted Nemesis's "charm and vitality", and called it "graphically gorgeous". It was nominated for "Best Adventure Game" at the Gamecenter Awards for '96, which went to The Neverhood.

In 2011, Adventure Gamers named Zork Nemesis the 51st-best adventure game ever released.

== See also ==
- The Space Bar
