= Tunnels & Trolls: Crusaders of Khazan =

1990 video game

Crusaders of Khazan
- Developers: New World Computing; Flying Buffalo; Fiery Dragon Productions
- Publisher: New World Computing
- Director: Jon Van Caneghem
- Designer: Liz Danforth
- Platforms: MS-DOS, FM Towns, NEC PC-88, PC-98, Sharp X1, X68000
- Release: 1990
- Genre: Role-playing
- Mode: Single-player

Crusaders of Khazan is a computer adaptation of the tabletop role-playing game Tunnels and Trolls, developed and published by New World Computing in 1990 for MS-DOS, FM Towns, PC-88 and PC-98. The game is available from Flying Buffalo and in Fiery Dragon's Tunnels and Trolls 30th Anniversary Edition. The game was an international production, designed and directed in the US but programmed in Japan.

== Plot ==
A long time ago, a war broke out in the Dragon Continent between the great wizard Khazan and the demon queen Lerotra'hh the Death Empress and her sorcerer consort Khara Kang. Wishing to stop the bloodshed, Khazan proposed a truce to Lerotra'hh: Khazan would go into exile in exchange for a promise that the evil pair would allow humankind and monsterkind to coexist peacefully. Lerotra'hh accepted the proposal and Khazan was never heard from again. As the game begins, however, Lerotra'hh has broken the pact and now she prepares her Dark Legions to attack. The player's quest is put this threat to an end (meaning killing Kang and then Lerotra'hh) and to bring Khazan back to this world to enforce the peace.

== Gameplay ==
The game is a fairly typical computer RPG of its era, featuring an icon-driven user interface, turn-based top-down combat and auto-mapping.

== Reception ==
Crusaders of Khazan received polarized reviews. The game received 5 out of 5 stars in Dragon. Scorpia and Marc Klupper of Computer Gaming World in 1991 both disliked the game, however, one writing that "it could have been so much more" and the other describing it as "an almost perfect example of what happens when designers and programmers do not work together ... How could the playtesters have missed so many flaws?" In 1993 Scorpia called the game "a big disappointment".

Jim Trunzo reviewed Tunnels & Trolls: Crusaders of Khazan in White Wolf #25 (Feb./March, 1991), rating it a 3 out of 5 and stated that "Tunnels & Trolls has many more pluses than minuses. It's fun to play and that is of primary importance. Nevertheless, the computer version of the game – much like the pencil and paper T&T – is a matter of taste. For everyone who loves the game, my guess is you'll find someone who slams it. It's a great introduction to roleplaying because, in spite of the game's depth, Tunnels and Trolls is relatively straightforward and simple. For many gamers, that will be a definite plus."
