= Neuromancer (video game) =

1988 video game

- Developer: Interplay Productions
- Publisher: Interplay Productions (Note: Distributed in North America by Mediagenic and licensed in Europe by Electronic Arts)
- Producers: Brian Fargo; Troy P. Worrell
- Designers: Bruce Balfour; Brian Fargo; Troy A. Miles; Michael A. Stackpole
- Programmer: Troy A. Miles
- Artist: Charles H. H. Weidman III
- Composers: Kurt Heiden; David Warhol
- Platforms: Amiga, Apple II, Apple IIGS, Commodore 64, MS-DOS
- Release: 1988
- Genre: Adventure
- Mode: Single-player

Neuromancer is an adventure video game developed by Interplay Productions and published by Mediagenic (a brand name of Activision) in 1988 that was loosely based on William Gibson's 1984 novel of the same name, set within both the fictional "real world" and the extensively realized and detailed world of cyberspace.

== Development ==
Neuromancer was originally intended to be a movie tie-in for a 1988 film adaptation of the novel by Cabana Boy Productions, who were in talks with Ridley Scott and Mel Gibson. Writer Timothy Leary had sub-contracted the rights to a video game adaptation of the novel, and eventually brought the project to Interplay to develop. Interplay put most of their staff on the project in order to release the game at the same time as the film; when the film was cancelled, Interplay considered cancelling the game as well, but continued development in order to avoid financial penalties.

The game was published in 1988 by Mediagenic for the Amiga, Apple II, Apple IIGS, Commodore 64, and MS-DOS. It has a soundtrack based on the Devo song "Some Things Never Change", originally written for the unmade film, from their album Total Devo.

== Gameplay ==
The gameplay is split between a traditional adventure setting, where a player can interact with "real world" inhabitants within Chiba City, and a 3D grid representation of cyberspace once the player manages to regain access. Different "real world" locations lead to different grid sectors, thus developing the plot and enriching the immersion.

Cyberspace combat is also simulated in the game as the player attempts to breach ICE (Intrusion Countermeasure Electronics) to gain entry to database nodes and potentially face the formidable AI (Artificial Intelligence) entities that hide behind them. "Combat" with ICE consists of the ICE and the player doing damage to each other (the former through a built-in attack form, the latter based on what programs the player ran; some programs did one-time damage, some did damage over time for a while, and some has other effects such as slowing down the ICE) until either the ICE "cracks" or the player is kicked out of cyberspace. Combat with AIs is similar, except that AIs are damaged primarily with skills rather than programs; are invulnerable until hit at least once with a specific skill or program; and the result of "losing" is character death. A deceased character can be reanimated for the price of whatever money was in his credit chip at the time of death — although remaining logged into cyberspace at some points requires credit payment.

Skills and abilities can be purchased as "skill chips" that are to be used in a brain jack implanted in the protagonist's head, giving the cowboy an edge in a variety of situations. Skills can also increase with successful completion of a difficult task.

The game also uses a code wheel as a form of copy protection. The code wheel is necessary to access the PAX terminals in the game at certain points and without it the player hits a dead-end in the plot.

== Plot ==
The game is loosely based on the events of the novel, and locations, characters, items and nuances of cyberspace from the novel appear.

Taking place in the year 2058 in Chiba, Japan, the plot centers on the protagonist attempting to discover the truth behind the mysterious disappearances of his friends as well as other, less friendly cyberspace cowboys. Unfortunately, the player's character has fallen on hard times and has had to pawn his cyberspace deck. He awakes in a plate of Ratz' famous spaghetti, and the first order of business is to find some way to retrieve his old deck from the nearby pawnshop.

After obtaining the deck and upgrading the software to enable cyberspace access, the character finds that users of the Matrix are being killed or flatlined by a group of AIs led by a renegade named Greystoke. After destroying Greystoke, the player meets Neuromancer who explains that he has manipulated the player into killing the other AIs, and traps him on a virtual island. However, the player can use their skills to escape and destroy Neuromancer, making the Matrix safe again.

Some other aspects of the book are included in the game as red herrings. For example, the player can contact Armitage at one point. However, if the player accepts his mission, Armitage is arrested and the player could be arrested as well. In some other parts of the game, there are references to Molly.

== Reception ==
Writing for Computer Gaming World, Douglas Seacat gave Neuromancer a very favorable review, citing the game's pacing and wit, as well as the use of Gibson's setting. Combat was also praised, as was the reward of information for winning combat. The only complaints Seacat had about the game were the predetermined responses in conversation, and the excessive use of disk swapping. Computer Gaming World awarded it a title of "Adventure Game of the Year", and in 1996 included it on lists of the "150 Best Games of All Time" and "15 best ways to die in computer gaming".

In Issue 12 of Gateways, Charles and Sydney Barouch warned, "This is not an easy game. It will require a lot of thinking and a careful reading of the manual." They also suggested familiarity with the novel was essential.

Keith Farrell, in Compute!, also favorably reviewed the game, citing the graphics, user interface, and the Devo soundtrack, and only criticizing the "adolescent jokes". Compute! named the game to its list of "nine great games for 1989".

In 2004, Neuromancer was inducted into GameSpot's list of the greatest games of all time.
