= TusCon =

Science fiction convention

- Status: Active
- Genre: Science fiction
- Locations: Tucson, Arizona
- Country: USA
- Inaugurated: 1974
- Most recent: November 8-10, 2024
- Organizer: Baja Arizona Science Fiction Association
- Filing status: 501(c)(4)
- Website: http://www.tusconscificon.com/

TusCon is a science fiction, fantasy, and horror literary convention held annually in Tucson, Arizona since 1974. It is the oldest continuous science fiction convention in the state of Arizona.

It is currently presented every November by the Baja Arizona Science Fiction Association (BASFA), a 501(c)(4) not-for-profit corporation.

== Notable guests ==
TusCon has hosted a number of influential writers and artists as Guest of Honor in its history. Included are Cory Doctorow, Heather Dale, Diana Gabaldon, Ed Bryant, Suzy McKee Charnas, George R.R. Martin, Elizabeth A. Lynn, Robert Bloch, Karl Edward Wagner, John Varley, Terry Carr, Tim Powers, Stephen R. Donaldson, David Brin, Dennis McKiernan, Laurell K. Hamilton, and many others.

In addition to the scheduled Guest of Honor, TusCon has a reputation for drawing professional writers, artists, and publishers attend the convention. Among those are Forrest J. Ackerman, Robert Asprin, Keith Henson, S. P. Somtow, David Schow, Dr. Edwin "Buzz" Aldrin, Simon Hawke, Liz Danforth, Judith Tarr, Patrick Nielsen Hayden, and others.

== Activities ==
The event features a range of activities and programming. It offers a mix of panel discussions with authors, artists, and creators, workshops on writing and world-building, and Q&A sessions with industry professionals. Attendees can also enjoy cosplay events, a dealers' room filled with unique merchandise, demos and make & take craft activities, and a variety of interactive gaming events, including tabletop and live-action role-playing. Additionally, TusCon celebrates the creative spirit with an art show and silent auction, musical “filk” concerts, and performances by local entertainers.
