= Brian Fargo =

American video game executive

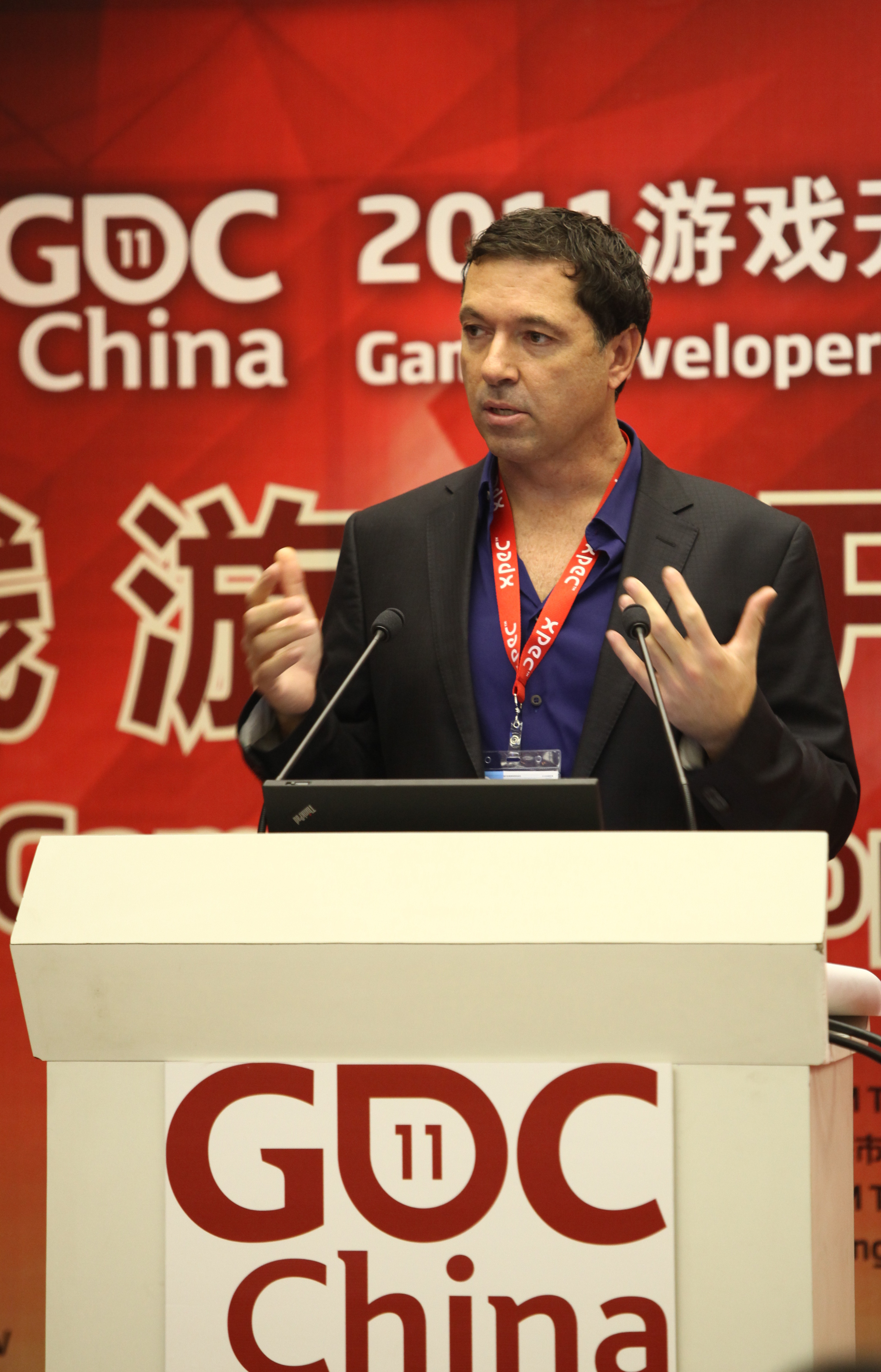
- Brian Fargo during his keynote at the Game Developers Conference China 2011
- Born: Frank Brian Fargo; Long Beach, California, US
- Occupation: CEO of inXile Entertainment

Frank Brian Fargo is an American video game designer, producer, programmer and executive, and founder of Interplay Entertainment, inXile Entertainment and Robot Cache.

In 2009, he was chosen by IGN as one of the top 100 game creators of all time.

== Biography ==
=== Early life ===
A descendant of the family that created the banking giants Wells Fargo and American Express, Fargo was born in Long Beach, California, and grew up in Whittier and Newport Beach. The only child of Frank Byron Fargo and Marie Curtis Fargo, he attended Corona del Mar High School, where he participated in track and field and developed a desire to create video games after his parents bought him an Apple II computer in 1977.

Brian Fargo wrote his first video game, Labyrinth of Martagon, with his friend Michael Cranford while still in high school. The team's first widely distributed game was the graphical text adventure The Demon's Forge, which Brian self-published and guerilla marketed in 1981 (and was later re-released by Boone Corporation). In 1982, Softline Magazine printed a letter from Fargo asking how On-Line Systems stored graphics in its graphic adventure The Wizard and the Princess. During this time period, he also wrote educational games for the World Book Encyclopedia.

=== Interplay ===
In 1983, Fargo founded Interplay Productions prior to landing his first contract in 1983 with Activision for Mindshadow, a graphical text adventure game for the Apple II and Commodore 64. After the release of Mindshadow, Fargo hired an old high school friend and started work to create a role-playing game Bard's Tale for the Apple II and C64 for a then-new publisher Electronic Arts. Fargo subsequently co-designed Interplay's early RPGs, including the critically acclaimed Wasteland, where a character named Faran Brygo is a play on his name.

Interplay at the time was utilizing small development teams of one to three people to produce games for other companies to publish, which only allowed Interplay to break even at best. In 1988, Fargo decided to make the transition from a development house to a developer/publisher, adding the additional costs of production and marketing, with both the risk and possible reward of publishing successful games. The first title produced by Interplay in this era was the internally developed Battle Chess, followed by Quicksilver Software's Castles. The company was also experimenting at the time with new ideas and products such as Neuromancer, a video game version of the novel by William Gibson.

By 1992, Interplay contracted with an old friend of Fargo's, Allen Adham, and his partner, Michael Morhaime, to create RPM Racing. This was Adham and Morhaime's first contract to produce a game as Silicon & Synapse and was one of the first of such finds for Fargo, who had an eye for recognizing talent in small development teams. Adham and Morhaime eventually changed the name of their company to Blizzard Entertainment, future developer of the Warcraft, StarCraft, Diablo and Overwatch franchises.

Interplay continued to expand in the mid-1990s, adding licensed titles to its own intellectual properties such as Stonekeep, by acquiring rights to the original Star Trek and creating a series of its adaptations. Fargo also continued to find talented small developers designing innovative games. One was Parallax Software, whose demo game eventually became the hit game Descent. Parallax, later renamed Volition, was eventually bought by THQ. In 1994, Universal/MCA bought a 45% stake in Interplay, which later went public in 1998.

Interplay grew to over 600 employees at its zenith in the mid-1990s. One of the most successful groups within Interplay was formed during this period, Black Isle. Black Isle focused on role-playing games and eventually included the games of a new developer called BioWare, which was initially contracted by Interplay to make Shattered Steel. The next game they developed for Interplay, through the Black Isle division, was Baldur's Gate, which proved to be a big hit, followed by others, such as Icewind Dale and the critically acclaimed Planescape: Torment.

In 1996, the company expanded again, adding a division focusing on sports games called VR Sports and buying Shiny Entertainment. Fargo's goal in the acquisition of Shiny was to help Interplay transition into the console business, in addition to its successful PC game releases. That same year, Computer Gaming World ranked Fargo as the third most influential "industry player" of all time, as he "has shown both brilliant product vision and great business talents."

In 1998, Interplay filed for an initial public offering (IPO) of stock to fund future development and retire debt the company held. At the time, the market for IPOs had started to slow from the boom years of the early and mid-1990s, yet the need for capital drove Fargo to file the offering. Increased competition, less than stellar returns on Interplay’s sports division and the lack of console titles forced the company to seek additional funding two years later with an investment from Titus Software, a Paris-based game company. In 1999, the relationship between Fargo and majority shareholder Titus deteriorated, according to Fargo, due to a "different ideology of management". In 2000, Titus exercised a majority control of Interplay, and as a result, Fargo resigned his position with the company.

In addition to his work at Interplay, Fargo also formed an online entertainment company Engage! with partner SoftBank in 1996, and sat on the board of Virgin Europe in 1998.

=== InXile Entertainment ===
After leaving Interplay, Fargo looked to find outlets for his creative drive and founded inXile Entertainment in 2002, a video game developer and publisher that includes many former Interplay employees. The name inXile sprang from a joke for his post-Interplay career: initially, Fargo gave himself the title of "leader-in-exile" at the company.

InXile Entertainment released a new Bard's Tale as one of its first titles, released by Vivendi Universal Games, but has found success in a new category of downloadable games, such as Line Rider and Fantastic Contraption. The company also developed a major title for Bethesda Softworks, Hunted: The Demon's Forge.

In 2012, inspired by the success of Double Fine Adventure's fan funded model, Fargo announced that he was going to attempt to fan-fund Wasteland 2 using the webservice Kickstarter. The project's fundraising campaign reached its $900,000 funding goal in its second day and Fargo said hopes that all of his future projects involve Kickstarter as it "offers all the freedoms that a developer hopes for." The Wasteland 2 Kickstarter campaign ended on April 17, 2012, raising a total of $2,933,252, making it the third highest crowd funded video game on Kickstarter to date, with an additional $107,152 in PayPal pledges. The Kickstarter campaign was documented in the documentary, Capital C.

On March 6, 2013, Fargo followed through on his promise to fund future projects through Kickstarter and launched Torment: Tides of Numenera, described as "a story-driven CRPG crafted in the tradition of Planescape: Torment and set in the world of Monte Cook's Numenera." The project reached its goal of $900,000 in just six hours and went on to break the Kickstarter record for fastest project to reach $1 million. The previous record had been held by the Ouya video game console which reached $1 million in 8 hours 22 minutes; Torment reached this amount in less than seven hours.

In May 2015 Fargo revealed The Bard's Tale IV and his intentions to launch a Kickstarter for it on June 2, 2015. It is a direct continuation of that story from the previous The Bard's Tale games. The Kickstarter concluded on July 10, 2015 with a final pledge total of $1,519,681 USD and 33,741 backers.

In March 2017, Fargo had announced his plans to retire from inXile following the release of Wasteland 3. However, in November 2018, Microsoft Studios announced their intention to buy inXile and make the studio a subsidiary. Because this would provide the studio with significantly more resources, Fargo stated he no longer plans to retire but instead will continue to lead the company.

=== Robot Cache ===
Fargo announced the founding of Robot Cache, a new digital games storefront for personal computer games expected to go live in Q2 2018. Robot Cache will deliver games via blockchains which can be decrypted or re-encrypted through the service; this will effectively allow players to buy and sell digital games without publishers fearing that the original owner can retain a copy after selling. This allows the service to ensure a higher percentage of each game sale goes back to the publisher; publishers are set to receive 95% of original game sales, and 70% of used game sales. While the site will accept normal forms of payment, it will also use a new cryptocurrency called Iron, which users will receive when reselling games and can be applied towards the purchase of new or used games.

=== Others ===
Fargo was a founder member of the board of advisors for Fig, a mixed investment/crowdfunding platform, since its launch in December 2015. As part of his involvement, he used Fig to crowdfund development of Wasteland 3. With inXile's purchase by Microsoft Studios, Fargo plans to remain on the board to help determine which games that Fig should support, but otherwise does not plan to use Fig for funding.

== Games ==
Year	Title	Role
1981	The Demon's Forge	Designer, programmer, writer
1985	Tales of the Unknown: Volume I - The Bard's Tale	Writer
1985	Borrowed Time	Writer
1986	The Bard's Tale II: The Destiny Knight	Writer
1986	Tass Times in Tonetown	Director
1988	The Bard's Tale III: Thief of Fate	Director
1988	Battle Chess	Producer, director
1988	Wasteland	Director
1989	Dragon Wars	Producer
1989	Neuromancer	Designer, director
1990	The Adventures of Rad Gravity	Designer, programmer
1990	Total Recall	Programmer
1990	Battle Chess II: Chinese Chess	Producer
1990	Swords and Serpents	Producer
1990	J.R.R. Tolkien's The Lord of the Rings, Vol. I	Executive producer
1991	J.R.R. Tolkien's The Lord of the Rings, Vol. II: The Two Towers	Executive producer
1991	Castles	Designer, producer
1991	Track Meet	Designer, producer
1992	Castles: The Northern Campaign	Executive producer
1992	The Bard's Tale Construction Set	Executive producer
1992	Battle Chess 4000	Executive producer
1992	Star Trek: 25th Anniversary	Executive producer
1992	The Lost Vikings	Executive producer
1992	Mario Teaches Typing	Executive producer
1992	Castles II: Siege and Conquest	Executive producer
1993	ClayFighter	Executive producer
1993	Claymates	Executive producer
1993	Rags to Riches: The Financial Market Simulation	Executive producer
1993	RoboCop Versus The Terminator	Executive producer
1993	Rock 'n Roll Racing	Executive producer
1993	SimCity Enhanced CD-ROM	Executive producer
1993	Star Trek: Judgment Rites	Executive producer
1993	Interplay's 10 Year Anthology	Executive producer
1993	Buzz Aldrin's Race into Space	Executive producer
1994	ClayFighter 2: Judgment Clay	Executive producer
1994	Heart of the Alien	Executive producer
1994	Out of This World	Executive producer
1995	Mario's Game Gallery	Executive producer
1995	Stonekeep	Executive producer
1996	Blood & Magic	Executive producer
1997	Fallout	Executive producer
1997	Star Trek: Starfleet Academy	Director (project leader)
1998	Of Light and Darkness: The Prophecy	Executive producer
1998	Fallout 2	Executive producer
2000	Wild Wild Racing	Executive producer
2004	The Bard's Tale	Designer, executive producer, writer
2007	Line Rider	Executive producer
2011	Hunted: The Demon's Forge	Executive producer, writer
2014	Wasteland 2	Executive producer
2017	Torment: Tides of Numenera	Executive producer
2018	The Bard's Tale IV: Barrows Deep	Executive producer
2020	Wasteland 3	Studio head
TBA	Clockwork Revolution	Executive producer
