= Mark Morgan (composer) =

- Origin: Los Angeles, California, US
- Occupations: Composer, pianist, keyboardist
- Years active: 1987–present

Mark Morgan is an American musician and score composer for video games, television and films. He is known for his work in Fallout, Fallout 2, and Planescape: Torment, and for being a former member of Starship. He was born in Los Angeles, California, to an architect, Melford Morgan and Betty Morgan, a classically trained pianist. It was while living with his parents that he became interested in music, and started to learn to play the piano.

Upon graduating from high school, he moved to Boston, where he enrolled in the Berklee College of Music, where he studied piano and composition, and where he learned about electronic music. In 1988, he joined Starship on keyboards, played on the Love Among the Cannibals album with the band, and toured with them until 1990.

== Albums ==
- Fade to Black (1987) (with Larry John McNally)
- Love Among the Cannibals (1989) (with Starship)
- So Many Routes (2004) (with Mike Sanchez)

=== Guest appearances ===
- 1987 - Roger Daltrey (on "Miracle of Love" and "The Heart Has Its Reasons" from Can't Wait to See the Movie)
- 1987 - Cher (on "Skin Deep" from Cher)
- 1994 - Stephen King's The Stand (Original Television Soundtrack)
- 1994 - My So-Called Life (Music from the Television Series)

== Film ==
- Where the Day Takes You (1992)
- The Prophet's Game (2000)
- Shark Attack 2 (2000) (direct-to-video)

== Video games ==
- Zork Nemesis (1995)
- Dark Seed II (1995)
- Shattered Steel (1996)
- Descent II (1996)
- Zork: Grand Inquisitor (1997)
- NetStorm: Islands At War (1997)
- Fallout (1997)
- Fallout 2 (1998)
- Planescape: Torment (1999)
- Civilization: Call to Power (1999)
- Giants: Citizen Kabuto (2000)
- Allods Online (2009)
- Need for Speed: Shift (2009)
- Wasteland 2 (2014)
- Prey 2 (canceled in 2014)
- Stasis (2015)
- Torment: Tides of Numenera (2017)
- The Bard's Tale IV: Barrows Deep (2018)
- Wasteland 3 (2020)
- Stasis Bone Totem (2023)

== Television ==
- Homecoming (1996)
- Ink (1996)
- Prey (1998)
- Brimstone (1999)
- One Tree Hill (2003–2012)
- Hawaii (2004)
- Helter Skelter (2004)
- Odd Girl Out (2005)
- Kojak (2005)
- Killer Instinct (2005)
- Shark (2006–2008)
