= Wasteland 2 =

2014 video game

- Developer: inXile Entertainment
- Publishers: Deep Silver; JP: Spike Chunsoft
- Directors: Matthew Findley; Chris Keenan
- Producer: Montgomery Markland
- Designers: Matthew Findley; Chris Keenan
- Programmers: John Alvarado; Dan Jenkins; Jason Jacobitz; Chris Wiedel
- Artist: Michael Kaufman
- Writer: Nathan Long
- Composer: Mark Morgan
- Series: Wasteland
- Engine: Unity
- Platforms: Microsoft Windows, OS X, Linux, PlayStation 4, Xbox One, Nintendo Switch
- Release: Windows, OS X, Linux: WW: September 19, 2014; Director's Cut; Windows, OS X, Linux: WW: October 13, 2015; PlayStation 4, Xbox One: NA: October 13, 2015; WW: October 16, 2015; Nintendo Switch: WW: September 13, 2018
- Genre: Role-playing
- Mode: Single-player

Wasteland 2 is a 2014 post-apocalyptic role-playing video game developed by inXile Entertainment and published by Deep Silver. It is the sequel to 1988's Wasteland, and was successfully crowdfunded through Kickstarter. After the postponement of the original release date from October 2013, it was released for Microsoft Windows, OS X, and Linux in September 2014. An enhanced version of the game, named Wasteland 2: Director's Cut, was released in October 2015, including versions for PlayStation 4, Xbox One, and Nintendo Switch.

A sequel, Wasteland 3 was released on August 28, 2020.

== Gameplay ==
Wasteland 2 features a semi-overhead view with a rotatable camera. It is a turn-based and party-based role-playing game with tactical combat. The player's party has room for seven characters, including the four player-designed characters and up to three non-player characters (NPCs). The player characters are highly customizable and the player's choice of statistics, skills, and appearance gives them an individualized personality. The non-player characters in the party each have their own personality, motivations, opinions, and agendas.

== Plot ==
The game is set in an alternate history timeline, in which a nuclear war between the United States and Soviet Union took place in 1998 in relation to an impact event involving a cluster of meteors that sparked a global nuclear war. On the day of the cataclysm, a company of U.S. Army Engineers were in the desolate southwestern desert constructing bridges in an area with a number of small survivalist communities and a newly constructed federal death row prison with light industrial facilities. The soldiers sought shelter in the prison, expelled the inmates, and invited nearby survivalists to join them shortly thereafter. Years later, together they formed "the Desert Rangers, in the great tradition of the Texas and Arizona Rangers", to help other survivors in the desert and beyond it.

The game begins fifteen years after the events of the original Wasteland (which was set in 2087), with the Rangers now occupying the former Guardian Citadel, which had formerly housed deranged technology-worshipping monks (the Guardians), but is now fully under Ranger control after the monks had been wiped out by the Rangers. The experienced ranger Ace is found dead by locals with signs of violence on his body. This greatly troubles General Vargas, the leader of the Desert Rangers. General Vargas, just a few days prior, sent Ace out to investigate a strange radio signal that speaks of "man and machine becoming one" while threatening to attack and wipe out the Desert Rangers. Controlling a squad of newly recruited rangers, the player is tasked with finding out who killed Ace and why they did it, and try to complete Ace's original mission.

=== Arizona ===
The story starts at the funeral of Ace, one of the Desert Rangers featured in the original game. General Vargas, leader of the Rangers, sends the four player-created Rangers, a newly comprised Ranger team Echo-One, out to investigate Ace's murder; they also have the option of taking along Angela Deth, Ace's lover and a highly experienced Ranger. Their initial investigation requires them to go to a radio tower in the desert where Ace was attacked and killed. There they find the body of a "synth", or AI-equipped synthetic human, that attacked him, and later disturbances at the antenna will reveal a squad of murderous robots - albeit relatively low-tech ones without proper artificial intelligence.

General Vargas is disturbed to learn of the existence of the synth, recalling the artificial intelligence monsters (Finster, a deranged android, and Cochise, a malevolent AI) that he and his fellow Rangers fought years before in the original Wasteland. He tells the recruits that they must take on Ace's original mission of installing repeater units in three radio towers in order to triangulate the location of a suspicious radio message. The first repeater is already installed; they must go to towers in Highpool (a community based around a local dam that provides the area with water) and the Ag Center (a science commune that grows genetically modified vegetables).

Things quickly get complicated as the Rangers are forced to choose between saving Highpool from raiders or the Ag Center from a lab experiment gone wrong; their choice wins them allies and acclaim from those they save, but means terrible losses for the other location (they can also fail to save both locations). The Rangers install the repeater unit in one of the two sites, and Vargas says that one last repeater needs to be installed in a town called Damonta, which is tucked away behind a wall of very high radiation and past a valley occupied by suicidal, nuke-worshipping monks.

The Rangers are able to find the mangled body of Hell Razor, another missing Ranger from Vargas' original team, in Rail Nomad's camp - he too was killed by the synths after trying to investigate them.

Ranger team Echo-One manage to find and make their way to Damonta, acquiring new allies, finding new communities and solving (or accidentally creating) crises along the way. There, instead of the bustling hub of activity they were expecting, they find Damonta torn apart by rampaging robots, with handfuls of survivors holed up in buildings. In the process of rescuing the survivors, the Rangers find a synth named Tinker installing a mechanical heart in a young girl. They kill it, and in doing so learn that it was working for another synth that plans to 'upgrade' humanity into robot bodies - whether they agree to the modifications or not.

With the repeater unit installed in Damonta, General Vargas traces the signal to Los Angeles, and sends out a helicopter with a team of crack Rangers, including Angela Deth. The player characters listen from the Ranger base as Angela and the team follow the signal to a military base, where they are attacked and their helicopter shot down. With the signal lost, Vargas sends the player's team to Los Angeles in the hope of finding out what happened.

=== Los Angeles ===
On the way, the players are forced to navigate a storm and run out of fuel, crash-landing in a crumbling factory compound in Santa Fe Springs. With the help of Lt Woodson, who survived the previous attack, they secure the compound and turn it into a Ranger outpost. Their goals are fourfold: acquire enough zeolite and cat litter to upgrade their radiation suits, allowing them passage across all of Los Angeles; fit out more radio towers with repeaters to boost the signal back to Arizona and tell Vargas that they have survived; help out the locals with their problems to promote the Ranger name; and track down the source of the suspicious signal.

The Rangers discover that the area is occupied by a number of factions of varying degrees of hostility: there are the Mannerites, who enforce politeness with excessive violence; the Robbinsons, who believe in the triumph of the powerful over the weak; God's Militia, a group of murderously pious priests and nuns; the Children of the Citadel, a group who are encouraging people to upgrade their bodies with technological augmentations, much as Tinker did, and follow a figure named Matthias; and a band of murderous robots controlled by an AI named Dugan.

The Rangers deal with the various arguments and fights in the LA wasteland while trying to stop an unknown adversary that is trying to besmirch their good name by framing them for a series of massacres.

Ultimately the team manage to acquire the upgraded radiation suits and report back in with Vargas, who sends them on to Seal Beach, the base of the Children of the Citadel, where Angela's team crashed. There, they find the downed chopper but no sign of Angela or anyone else. Infiltrating the base - and doing battle with groups of partly upgraded cyborgs in the process - the Rangers encounter Dugan, who had previously seemed to be an enemy of Matthias. In fact, he is in league with Matthias, and was merely providing a further incentive for the citizens of Los Angeles to join the church and voluntarily allow themselves to be upgraded.

It turns out that Matthias and Dugan are two survivor Guardians from the Guardian Citadel, having fled to Los Angeles from Arizona. For the past fifteen years they have been raising an army of cyborgs and modified humans in California and plotting to destroy the Rangers in revenge for wiping out their former faction, the Guardians. In addition, Matthias and Dugan plan to revive the Base Cochise Boss AI at the current Ranger Citadel (hidden in the computers beneath it, having copied itself there after the Base Cochise destruction). The two former Guardians believe that uploading their minds to the AI will make them achieve technological transcendence and be present in every AI host in the world, making them 'gods' ruling the world with the Children of the Citadel and Dugan's army of AI bots. Matthias tells the Rangers that the dormant security defenses in the Ranger base are now active and turned against the Rangers and that their old friends will probably all be dead by now while Dugan prepares to finish the Echo-One team off personally.

After destroying several tons of deranged machines, including Dugan himself, the Rangers acquire a helicopter and immediately fly to the Ranger Citadel in a rescue attempt. The Citadel is on fire and swarming with dangerous robots, with scores of Rangers having been killed, including one of the original Ranger heroes Thrasher. With the aid of General Vargas and those members of the Arizona wasteland that they have helped, the Rangers kill their way down to a previously inaccessible AI core, and prepare to do battle with Matthias.

However, before the fight can begin, the Base Cochise Boss AI is revived and takes over the body of Matthias (actually erasing his mind completely), his synthetic bodyguard army, and any cyborg allies that the Rangers may have acquired during the course of the game. It turns out that the AI plans to directly and remotely control all cyborgs and machines in the wasteland, either converting humans into its drones or exterminating them all.

A massive fight ensues and the Rangers are able to destroy the Boss AI minions. The Rangers learn that the Cochise AI was actually the instigator of the nuclear war by provoking the Soviets into launching nuclear missiles resulting in a war that almost destroyed the entire world. With the spread of the AI to other computers worldwide imminent, the only way to kill it appears to be by completely destroying the Ranger Citadel with a crudely jury-rigged nuclear bomb prepared by a deceased Ranger demolitions expert. One of the Rangers or their surviving allies sacrifices themselves to give the others a chance to flee. As the escape chopper soars into the irradiated skies, the former Ranger Citadel is obliterated in a ball of nuclear fire. An epilogue sequence then explains how the Rangers' actions affected each of the communities they came into contact with, and what happened to some of their more prominent allies.

== Development ==
A "look and feel" concept art for the game, showing the Desert Rangers

In 2003, inXile Entertainment, founded by Wasteland's producer and co-designer, Brian Fargo, acquired the rights to Wasteland from Electronic Arts, which had let the rights lapse and handed them to Fargo after a discussion with him. In June 2007, Fargo stated: "I am indeed looking into bringing back the game that spawned the Fallout series. Stay tuned..." In November 2007, Fallout fan website Duck and Cover reported on possible concept art images from Wasteland 2 displayed in the main header of the inXile Entertainment website.

On February 16, 2012, inXile announced their plans to have a crowd funded production of a new Wasteland game, inspired by Double Fine's recent success of using Kickstarter to fund Double Fine Adventure; it was one of a number of games to be funded in the video game crowdfunding boom that followed the success of Double Fine Adventure. Project director Brian Fargo has reassembled key team members from the original Wasteland: Alan Pavlish, Michael A. Stackpole, Ken St. Andre and Liz Danforth, as well as the early Fallout games' designer Jason Anderson (Anderson, however, left the company in December 2010). The composer Mark Morgan, who created the soundtracks for Fallout and Fallout 2, was also hired to compose music for the game.

On March 13, 2012, the Kickstarter page for the production of Wasteland 2 went live. A minimum budget of $1,000,000 was set for the project, but Fargo agreed to cover up to $100,000 if need be, should the project fall short, and the campaign's goal was set at $900,000, the largest target for any Kickstarter project at that point. Within 24 hours, the contributions totaled nearly $600,000, and the original goal was reached in under 43 hours. The "tremendous" success of the campaign made ranked number four on the Complex list of the biggest video game wins and fails on Kickstarter in 2012. Much of the money raised for Wasteland 2 came from first-time backers of Double Fine Adventure. On March 30, it was announced that, should the funded amount reach $2.1 million or more, the game's development would include Chris Avellone. The Wasteland 2 Kickstarter ended on the April 17, raising a total of $2,933,252, with an additional $107,152 in PayPal pledges. On April 24, it was confirmed that Obsidian developers would be working on the project.

Brian Fargo originally stated that the team aimed to ship Wasteland 2 around October 2013, and on July 10, 2012 it was announced that the original Wasteland would be bundled with it. There are no plans to support any consoles or handheld devices. In August 2012, Planescape: Torment writer/designer Colin McComb joined the development team as a writer. Nathan Long signed up as a co-writer two months later. The first trailer for Wasteland 2 was released on February 9, 2013, showcasing some of the story, art and gameplay, with an audio commentary from the producer Chris Keenan.

Fargo announced in July 2013 that the game was being delayed. The producer stated an intent to begin beta testing a "feature complete" version of the game at that time, with a final release date to be determined during the beta.

== Release ==
On December 13, 2013, Wasteland 2 became available as an early access beta on the Steam store. In May 2014, inXile announced that the release date would be at the end of August 2014. The game was subsequently delayed to September 2014, so as to be able to fulfill physical reward and game disk requirements. In August 2014, it was announced that the game would be released on September 19, 2014.

The standard edition contains a free copy of Wasteland 1 - The Original Classic, the game soundtrack and the game manual. A Digital Deluxe Edition was released on video game distribution services and contained a free copy of The Bard's Tale and three digital novellas set in the universe of the game. In addition, Deep Silver released a limited Ranger Edition available in Europe that included a collector's box, soundtrack, game manual, collector cards, a printed map of the game world, a download code for Wasteland 1 - The Original Classic, and a double sided poster.

=== Director's Cut ===
In February 2015, the developers announced that the game would be receiving a visual upgrade with the game engine being moved to Unity 5 from Unity 4.5, as well as new gameplay features and modding tools.

On March 3, 2015, at the Game Developers Conference Microsoft announced that Wasteland 2 was in development for Xbox One. The following day, Wasteland 2 was announced for PlayStation 4. The console version was to be a port of the enhanced PC version of the game, then described as Wasteland 2: Game of the Year Edition. In April 2015, the developers said that it would run at 1080p resolution on both consoles. The enhanced version would be available for free to all Kickstarter backers and anyone who bought the original game.

In June 2015, Wasteland 2: Game of the Year Edition was renamed to Wasteland 2: Director's Cut and a trailer showcasing the enhanced version was released on June 23, 2015.

The Director's Cut was released digitally on October 13, 2015, with retail editions released on the same day in North America and other territories on October 16.

In February 2017, inXile partnered with IndieBox, a monthly subscription box service, to release a physical version of Wasteland 2: Director's Cut. This limited collector's edition included a DRM-free game disc, the official soundtrack, an instruction manual, Steam key, and various custom-designed collectible items.

Besides the visual upgrade, the Director's Cut edition featured many other improvements and additions: expanded voice-overs (with over 8,000 new lines of pre-recorded dialogue), new perks and quirks, a "Precision Strike" system allowing the player to target individual body parts to cripple or stun enemies or shatter their armour, redesigned encounters, a redesigned user interface, and controller support.

== Reception ==
Reception

Aggregate scores
Aggregator	Score
GameRankings	(PC) 80.70%
Metacritic	PC: 81/100; PC (Director's Cut): 87/100; PS4: 81/100; XONE: 77/100; NS: 76/100

Review scores
Publication	Score
Destructoid	8/10
Eurogamer	8/10
Game Informer	8.75/10
GameSpot	8/10
GameTrailers	8.6/10
IGN	8.4/10
Joystiq	3/5
VideoGamer.com	6/10
PC Gamer	83/100
Hardcore Gamer	3.5/5

Award
Publication	Award
PC World	Game of the Year

Wasteland 2 received generally positive reviews from critics. The game holds an aggregate score of 80.70% on GameRankings based on 32 reviews and a score of 81/100 on Metacritic based on 54 reviews. The game generated a revenue of $1.5 million in its first 4 days of release, and sold roughly 350,000 copies by May 2015. In September 2016, Fargo stated that inXile had earned $12 million from sales of the game.

Leif Johnson of IGN praised its story writing and branching storyline impacted by the player's choices. Daniel Starkey of GameSpot lauded its environmental graphics and tactical gameplay. Alasdair Duncan of Destructoid wrote that it "delivers exactly what was expected". Richard Cobbett of Eurogamer stated, "it's very clearly made with love to be true to the original game while still learning from the games that followed." Daniel Tack of Game Informer called it a "triumphant heir" to the original game and praising its re-playability and audio quality. Earnest Cavalli of Joystiq criticized the game for being buggy. Cory Banks of PC Gamer praised its combat and writing. It was later given the Game of the Year award for 2014 by PC World.

== Reviews ==
- Casus Belli (v4, Issue 12 - Nov/Dec 2014)
