= Torment: Tides of Numenera =

Role-playing video game

- Developer: inXile Entertainment
- Publisher: Techland Publishing (Note: Original publisher, currently self-published by inXile Entertainment)
- Directors: Colin McComb; Kevin Saunders
- Producer: Eric Daily
- Designer: Adam Heine
- Programmer: Steve Dobos
- Artists: Charlie Bloomer; Aaron Meyers
- Writer: Colin McComb
- Composer: Mark Morgan
- Engine: Unity
- Platforms: Linux; macOS; Microsoft Windows; PlayStation 4; Xbox One
- Release: February 28, 2017
- Genre: Role-playing
- Mode: Single-player

Torment: Tides of Numenera is a 2017 role-playing video game developed by inXile Entertainment and published by Techland Publishing for Microsoft Windows, macOS, Linux, PlayStation 4 and Xbox One. It is a spiritual successor to 1999's Planescape: Torment.

The game takes place in The Ninth World, a science fantasy campaign setting written by Monte Cook for his tabletop RPG Numenera. Torment: Tides of Numenera, like its predecessor, is primarily story-driven while placing greater emphasis on interaction with the world and characters, with combat and item accumulation taking a secondary role.

The game was crowd-funded through Kickstarter in March 2013. At the campaign's conclusion, Torment: Tides of Numenera had set the record for highest-funded video game on Kickstarter with over US$4 million pledged. The release date was initially set for December 2014, but was pushed back to February 2017.

== Gameplay ==
An early in-game screenshot from "the Bloom" area

Torment: Tides of Numenera uses the Unity engine to display the pre-rendered 2.5D isometric perspective environments. The tabletop ruleset of Monte Cook's Numenera has been adapted to serve as the game's rule mechanic, and its Ninth World setting is where the events of Torment: Tides of Numenera take place. The player experiences the game from the point of view of the Last Castoff, a human host that was once inhabited by a powerful being, but was suddenly abandoned without memory of prior events.

As with its spiritual predecessor, Planescape: Torment, the gameplay of Torment: Tides of Numenera places a large emphasis on storytelling, which unfolds through a "rich, personal narrative", and complex character interaction through the familiar dialog tree system. The player is able to select the gender of the protagonist, who will otherwise start the game as a "blank slate", and may develop his or her skills and personality from their interactions with the world. The Numenera setting provides three base character classes: Glaive (warrior), Nano (wizard) and Jack (rogue). These classes can be further customized with a number of descriptors (such as "Tough" or "Mystical") and foci, which allow the character to excel in a certain role or combat style.

Instead of a classic alignment system acting as a character's ethical and moral compass, Torment: Tides of Numenera uses "Tides" to represent the reactions a person inspires in their peers. Each Tide has a specific color and embodies a number of nuanced concepts that are associated with it. The composition of Tides a character has manipulated the most determines their Legacy, which roughly describes the way they have taken in life. Different Legacies may affect what bonuses and powers certain weapons and relics provide, as well as give a character special abilities and enhance certain skills.

== Synopsis ==
=== Setting ===
Tides of Numenera has a science fantasy setting. In the far future (one billion years), the rise and fall of countless civilizations have left Earth in a roughly medieval state, with most of humanity living in simple settlements, surrounded by technological relics of the mysterious past. The current age is called the "Ninth World" by its scholars, who believe that eight great ages existed and were destroyed, disappeared or left the Earth for unknown reasons before the present day, leaving ruins and various oddities and artifacts behind. These artifacts are known as the "numenera" and represent what is left of the science and technology of these past civilizations. Many of them are irreparably broken, but some are still able to function in ways that are beyond the level of understanding of most humans, who believe these objects to be magical in nature.

=== Characters ===
Character complexity and dialogue depth were identified among the primary elements of the Planescape: Torment legacy to be preserved and refined by the developers of Torment: Tides of Numenera.

The tormented nature of the game's protagonist, the Last Castoff, attracts other, similarly affected people. They will play a significant role in his or her story as friends and companions, or as powerful enemies. The game contains seven companions in total: Aligern, Callistege, Erritis, Matkina, Oom, Tybir, and Rhin.

=== Plot ===
The protagonist of the story, known as the Last Castoff, is the final vessel for the consciousness of an ancient man, who managed to find a way to leave his physical body and be reborn in a new one, thus achieving a kind of immortality by means of the relics. The actions of this man, known as the Changing God to some, attracted the enmity of "The Sorrow" (renamed from "The Angel of Entropy" to reduce the potential to imply a religious role), who now seeks to destroy him and his creations. The Last Castoff, being one such "creation", is also targeted by the Sorrow, and must find their master before both are undone. To do so, the protagonist must explore the Ninth World, discovering other castoffs, making friends and enemies along the way. One means of such exploration are the "Meres" – artifacts that let their user gain control over the lives of other castoffs, and experience different worlds or dimensions through them. Through these travels the Last Castoff will leave their mark on the world – their Legacy – and will find an answer to the fundamental question of the story: What does one life matter?

While the overall story varies wildly depending on personal preferences and specific interactions, the central storyline follows the Last Castoff as they search for a way to defeat or escape the Sorrow. They explore Sagus Cliffs after falling from a great height into a domed structure, destroying an artifact known as a resonance chamber that is believed to be capable saving the Last Castoff from the Sorrow. Finding another castoff, Matkina, The Last uses a Mere, a repository of memory to locate the entrance to Sanctuary. Using the Mere also alters the past, allowing Matkina to be healed of her mental damage. The Last finds Sanctuary, which the Changing God created as a hiding place from the Sorrow, where the Last finds a number of castoffs who represent both sides of the Eternal War: a conflict between followers of the Changing God, and followers of the First Castoff, who believe the God is selfish and malevolent. The Sorrow breaches Sanctuary after the Last is told that the resonance chamber will "defeat" the Sorrow by destroying every castoff in existence. After escaping the Sorrow through a portal to the Bloom, an apparition appears claiming to be the actual Changing God and attempts to possess the Last by force of will.

== Development ==
In a 2007 interview, designers Chris Avellone and Colin McComb, who had worked on Planescape: Torment, stated that although a direct sequel was not considered because the game's story was over, they were open to the idea of a similar-themed Planescape game if they could gather most of the original development team and find an "understanding set of investors". This combination was deemed infeasible at the time. Talks about creating a sequel with the help of a crowd funding platform resumed in 2012, but attempts to acquire a Planescape license from Wizards of the Coast failed. Later that year, Colin McComb joined inXile, which was at the time working on its successfully crowd funded Wasteland 2 project. The studio gained the rights to the Torment title shortly thereafter.

In January 2013, inXile's CEO Brian Fargo announced that the spiritual successor to Planescape: Torment was in pre-production and would be set in the Numenera RPG universe created by Monte Cook. Cook acted as one of the designers of the Planescape setting, and Fargo saw the Numenera setting as the natural place to continue the themes of the previous Torment title. Although the connections to its predecessor will not be relatively overt, due to licensing issues, it was noted that certain traditional RPG elements are relatively hard to copyright, and some elements of Planescape: Torment may make a reappearance. Development of the game began shortly after the acquisition of the Torment license, and various inXile staff will transition over to the Numenera team as production on Wasteland 2 winds down. In late January 2013, inXile confirmed the game's title as Torment: Tides of Numenera, and announced that Planescape: Torment composer Mark Morgan would create the soundtrack. The pre-production period was initially expected to continue until October 2013. During this phase, team composition for the project was to be finalised and development would focus on production planning, game design and dialog writing. With the Wasteland 2 project facing delays in 2014, full production of Torment: Tides of Numenera was rescheduled to a later date.

A Kickstarter campaign to crowd fund Torment: Tides of Numenera was launched on March 6, 2013 with a US$900,000 goal. Project director Kevin Saunders explained this choice of a funding source by stating that the traditional publisher-based funding model is flawed because it forces the developer into attempting to appeal to an abstract target audience, picked by the publisher. A crowd funding platform, on the other hand, would allow the developers to present their vision directly to potential buyers and determine its viability early on, making it a better choice for a mid-sized or smaller developer studio, like inXile. The campaign had attracted several high-profile backers, such as Markus Persson, creator of Minecraft, and Min-Liang Tan, CEO of Razer USA.

The campaign reached its initial funding goal in six hours, and went on to surpass a million dollars mark in seven hours, breaking the then-Kickstarter-record for the fastest project to do so. At the conclusion of the Kickstarter campaign, a total of $4,188,927 had been pledged. Two post-Kickstarter stretch goals locations were also reached and added into the game. After its official campaign ended, the game continued to raise funding on its website, with more than $870,000 being raised.

== Release ==
The planned release date announced during the fund raising campaign was set to December 2014, but was later postponed "a few months" due to the need to implement the numerous achieved stretch goals. During the course of the game's development, its release was delayed to the fourth quarter of 2015, then 2016, and eventually to the first quarter of 2017. The game would ship DRM-free to the Microsoft Windows, MacOS and Linux platforms and would be available in six languages: English, French, German, Polish, Russian and Spanish. A beta version of the game was released for Kickstarter backers on January 17, 2016, and through Steam Early Access on January 26, 2016.

On June 9, 2016, inXile announced that the game's beta is available for all Kickstarter backers. On August 4, 2016, inXile announced that the game would additionally be released on Xbox One and PlayStation 4 on the same release date as previous platforms. The game was released on February 28, 2017 on the Windows, MacOS, Linux, Xbox One and PlayStation 4 platforms.

== Reception ==
Reception

Aggregate score
Aggregator	Score
Metacritic	(PC) 81/100 (PS4) 76/100 (XONE) 79/100

Review scores
Publication	Score
Destructoid	7.5/10
Game Informer	8.5/10
GameRevolution	4.5/5
GameSpot	9/10
IGN	8.8/10
PC Gamer (US)	89/100
Polygon	8/10
VideoGamer.com	8/10

Torment: Tides of Numenera received "generally favorable" reviews, according to video game review aggregator website Metacritic.

Destructoid's Ray Porreca scored the game a 7.5/10, arguing that "[its] various parts [...] come together in a solid package. Though it isn't perfect, there's no doubt that this is an RPG that will appeal to a specific type of person." Porecca criticized the combat, saying "The turn-based system is functional, but even with a host of skills and companions to help pitch in, it still feels clunky". He, however, praised the worldbuilding and character creation and recommended it to "role-players keen on experiencing a game of consequences and twisted fantasy".

James Kozanitis's 4.5 out of 5 stars score on Game Revolution stated that "Whereas the fun in a game like For Honor comes from physically learning how to play, the fun in Tides of Numenera comes from achieving encyclopedic knowledge of a whole new universe through truly meaningful choices."

Leif Johnson from IGN gave the game a score of 8.8/10 saying that "Torment: Tides of Numenera delivers a deep and satisfyingly strange RPG world loaded with text-based storytelling."

Chris Thursten of PC Gamer awarded it an 89/100 stating that "A slow start gives way to a thought-provoking adventure in a remarkable setting. A fitting follow-up to a beloved RPG."

"Aside from some issues with encounter balance and my yearnings for more detail, it's a beautiful, challenging game, content to be ambiguous, rich and confounding in ways that few other RPGs have ever pulled off" was Carli Velocci's conclusion with a score of 8/10 on Polygon

Alice Bell's score of 8/10 on VideoGamer.com said that "Great writing and environment design, combined with an epic story and wide range of player choice, make Tides of Numenera a wonderful RPG. The reliance on text won't be for everyone, but fans of the genre are going to love it."

Eurogamer ranked the game 15th on their list of the "Top 50 Games of 2017".

=== Awards ===
The game won the award for "Best Setting" in Game Informer's 2017 RPG of the Year Awards.

Year	Award	Category	Result	Ref.
2017	Develop Awards	Best Writing	Nominated	
2017	Golden Joystick Awards	Best Storytelling	Nominated	
2018	New York Game Awards 2018	Off-Broadway Award for Best Indie Game	Nominated	
2018	21st Annual D.I.C.E. Awards	Role-Playing Game of the Year	Nominated	
