= Fountain of Dreams =

1990 video game

- Developer: Electronic Arts
- Publisher: Electronic Arts
- Designers: Dave Albert; Banjo Bob Hardy
- Platform: MS-DOS
- Release: 1990
- Genre: Role-playing
- Mode: Single-player

Fountain of Dreams is a 1990 role-playing video game developed and published by Electronic Arts for MS-DOS as a successor to 1988's Wasteland.

== Gameplay ==
Starting location

The gameplay is similar to that of Wasteland since Fountain of Dreams was originally intended to be a sequel. It is considered to be "very unforgiving" near the beginning, making it hard to get started in the game without dying.

== Plot ==
The game is set in post-nuclear war Florida, physically separated from the continental United States by intensive bombing during World War III that sparked an enormous earthquake. Central Florida itself was hit heavily with neutron and chemical weapons, in order to destroy the life there and preserve the technology. 50 years later after "The Change", life on the island of Florida is threatened by mutations due to residual ionizing radiation. Adding to the threat are the deranged Killer Clowns, as well as three organized crime factions: the DeSoto Family, the Obeah Orders, and the Bahia Mafia. The player controls a small band of adventurers who set out to find the purifying waters of the legendary "Fountain of Dreams" to stop the spread of mutation.

== Development ==
The game was originally intended as a follow-up to Wasteland, but neither Interplay nor any of the creative team that created Wasteland worked on it. In effect, the game engine is similar, but was created from scratch, and in 2003, Electronic Arts dropped all claims that the game had any connection to Wasteland. Fountain of Dreams was part of the beginning of a trend at EA to produce in-house sequels to its previous titles.

== Reception ==
Fountain of Dreams was met with negative reception as it was a much shorter and smaller game than Wasteland. Computer Gaming World in 1991 described it as inferior to the predecessor, stating it "incorporat[ed] all the worst features of that game, and not much of the good." The magazine noted that the game had no copy protection, "but then, a product like this probably doesn't need any." In 1993, the magazine called the game "a horrible post-nuke loser" with an "inane plot, ridiculous combat, and terrible ending". In 1996, Computer Gaming World ranked it as the 41st-worst game of all time, stating "Wasteland got stupid as killer clowns, a silly plot, and fear of Disney ruined the sequel."
