= Hitman (disambiguation) =

A hitman is an assassin involved in contract killing.

Hitman, Hit Man, or Hitmen may also refer to:

== Arts, entertainment and media ==
=== Fictional characters ===
- Hitman (DC Comics), a fictional character in the DC Comics universe
- Hitman (Marvel Comics), a fictional character in the Marvel Comics universe

=== Literature ===
- Hitman: Enemy Within, a novel by William C. Dietz
- Hit Man, a novel by Lawrence Block
- Hit Man: A Technical Manual for Independent Contractors, a 1983 book by Rex Feral
- Hit Men: Power Brokers and Fast Money Inside the Music Business, an exposé of the music industry by Fredric Dannen
- Hitman (manga), a Japanese manga series by Kouji Seo

=== Film and television ===
- Hit Man (1972 film), an American blaxploitation film directed by George Armitage
- Hit Man (American game show) that aired in 1983
- Hitman (British game show), a quiz programme that aired in 1989
- The Hit Man, a 1991 TV film directed by Gary Nelson
- The Hitman, a 1991 action/adventure film starring Chuck Norris
- Hitman (1997 film), a British action film
- The Hitman, a 1997 Polish comedy film
  - Two Hitmen, a 1999 Polish comedy film, sequel to the 1997 film
- Hitman (1998 film), a Hong Kong action film
- Hitman Hart: Wrestling with Shadows, a 1998 documentary about wrestler Bret Hart
- "Hitman", an episode of Law & Order
- Hitman (2007 film), a film based on the Hitman video game series starring Timothy Olyphant
  - Hitman: Agent 47, a 2015 film based on the Hitman video game series, starring Rupert Friend
- Kyō Kara Hitman, a 2009 Japanese film and a 2023 drama adapted from the manga by Hiroshi Mutō
- "Hitman" (Adventure Time), a 2011 episode of the American animated television series Adventure Time
- Hitman (2014 film), a Bangladeshi film
- Hitman: David Foster & Friends, American TV special featuring David Foster
- Hit Men (film), 2016 film with Happy Anderson
- Hitman: Agent Jun, a 2020 South Korean action comedy film
  - Hitman 2 a 2025 South Korean action comedy film, sequel to the 2020 film
- Hit Man (2023 film), an American action-comedy starring Glen Powell

=== Video games ===
- Hitman (franchise), a media franchise, based upon a video game series
  - Hitman: Codename 47, a 2000 video game
  - Hitman 2: Silent Assassin, a 2002 video game
  - Hitman: Contracts, a 2004 video game
  - Hitman: Blood Money, a 2006 video game
  - Hitman: Absolution, a 2012 video game
  - Hitman Go, a 2014 mobile game
  - Hitman: Sniper, a 2015 mobile game
  - Hitman (2016 video game), a 2016 video game
  - Hitman 2 (2018 video game), a 2018 video game
  - Hitman 3, a 2021 video game

== Music ==
- The Hitmen, an Australian hard rock band
- The Hitmen (British band)
- Hittman (band), an American heavy metal band
- The Hitmen (production team)

=== Albums ===
- Hit Men, a 1996 album by Daevid Allen & Kramer
- The Hit Man, a 1975 album by Eddie Kendricks
- Hit Man, an album by Neal Morse
- The Hit Men, a compilation album by The Stranglers

=== Songs ===
- "Hitman", a song by The Stranglers, single b-side from the album Dreamtime
- "Hitman", a song by Yo Yo Honey Singh from the 2025 Indian film Fateh
- "The Hitman", a song by AB Logic
- "The Hitman", a song by Queen from Innuendo

== Sports ==
- Calgary Hitmen, a junior ice hockey team; named for professional wrestler Bret Hart (see below)
- New York/New Jersey Hitmen, an American XFL football team

== People ==
- The Hitman (nickname)
- Uzi Hitman (1952–2004), Israeli singer, songwriter, composer, and television personality

== See also ==
- Hitman 2 (disambiguation)
- Hittman (disambiguation)
- Cleaner (disambiguation)
  - Cleaner (crime)
- Fixer (disambiguation)
  - Fixer (person)
