= Hokkaido (Hitman) =

Hitman location

- Hitman location
- First appearance: Hitman - Episode 6: Hokkaido (2016)
- Last appearance: Hitman 3 (2021)
- Created by: Torbjørn Christensen
- Genre: Stealth

In-universe information
- Location: Japan

Hokkaido is a level from IO Interactive's Hitman video game franchise. It takes place in the fictional GAMA Private Hospital in a remote location of Hokkaido, Japan.

== Development ==
Hokkaido was created by lead level designer Torbjørn Christensen. Christensen and lead game designer Jesper Hylling describe it as an absurd location due to how remote and inconvenient it is for people to get to it, but Christensen regarded that as a strength, owing to its "fantastical" nature that allows them to take more liberties than if it was set in Tokyo. The developers had been looking for an opportunity to include a hospital in the Hitman series for a while, brainstorming on what could go wrong in a hospital setting. Initially, the setting was just going to be a hospital, but the team elected to add the resort and morgue in order to make it more surprising for players. They also sought to make the different parts of the level feel visually and thematically distinct. They went to lengths to ensure that the different areas felt like they made sense to be connected to one another, justifying the presence of a resort being that a rich patient would want to recuperate or the staff room having a dance mat game because it's set in Japan. When describing the level archetype Hokkaido fits into, Christensen called it a spiral, due to how they wrap around and interconnect with stairs and slopes.

They set the location in Japan as part of their effort to have a hospital where the technology "borders on science fiction." They also chose it because they wanted to have a controlled climate setting located in a setting that's otherwise harsh. They also aimed to make the spa area inviting from a tourist point of view. The level is designed to be more restrictive than normal, requiring Agent 47 to be wearing certain disguises to get into certain areas. This is done by having an AI control the facility, and it only allows doors to open if Agent 47 is wearing a disguise that it deems fit to enter that area of the facility. The idea was that clothes were fitted with RFID chips that the AI would identify. This was a difficult thing to get working well, creating a number of issues for the team. They wanted to experiment with the idea of emphasizing the disguises after they experimented with a more military-focused level in Colorado. They had to avoid potentially confusing players, which they accomplished by having an early area require them to learn the gimmick, as well as through signposting the access levels on the doors and the clothing.

Hokkaido is a more dense level, which affects how the 300 non-playable character limit manifests. In other levels, areas that should be more densely populated than they are, have justifications for why they aren't. Meanwhile, because the level is smaller, no such justification is necessary, and the level is busier as a result.

Art director Jonathan Rowe worked on the level, and found that Hokkaido being "clean, stark, and austere" made it more difficult to make the level look good. He felt that more details make something look more realistic, but due to how fertile the level was, it was difficult to make it not seem unfinished. Rowe accomplished this by focusing on "micro details and surface details" to complete the package. A surgical robot resembling a spider was featured in the level, and was based on car manufacturing robots. Rowe wanted something that was both "industrial and clunky" yet moved unnaturally fluidly, finding those two themes working in concert "very disturbing."

=== Characters ===
With Hokkaido, Christensen wanted to experiment with a static target to see if it would be interesting. This was attempted with the character Erich Soders, who is unconscious while undergoing gene therapy. Christensen wanted to take advantage of the spiral structure of the level as part of this target. He was partly designed in response to a mission in the Sapienza level, where Agent 47 has to eliminate a virus in an underground seaside cave. Christensen felt limited by this due to the fact that the virus had only few ways to be eliminated, and thus aimed to provide more in this case. This was accomplished by implementing failsafes designed to resuscitate Soders that need to be prevented. Soders was also chosen for this because of his role in the game, being that he had the power to determine whether Agent 47 would live or die. The designers put him in a helpless state in order to turn the tables in their roles.

Helmut Kruger, a character from the Paris level, was mentioned in this level in response to positive fan feedback.

== Level content ==
The level takes place in a hospital located in Japan, featuring three tiers. The top tier is a luxury resort, sushi restaurant, garden, hot springs, and more. The middle tier is the area where surgeries are performed and the staff live. Finally, the bottom tier is a morgue.

== Release ==
Hokkaido first appeared as the setting of the sixth and final episode of the 2016 Hitman game, with the episode releasing on October 31, 2016. It was later featured in a complete edition of Hitman, which launched on January 31. Hokkaido reappears in Hitman 2, given a new mission. It later appeared in Hitman 3.

== Reception ==
Hitman - Episode 6: Hokkaido

Aggregate score
Aggregator	Score
Metacritic	81/100 (PS4); 83/100 (PC)

Review scores
Publication	Score
Destructoid	8/10
Hardcore Gamer	4/5
IGN	8.3/10
PC Gamer (US)	8.5/10

The Hokkaido level and its containing episode was met with generally positive reception, holding an 81 and 83 on Metacritic for PlayStation 4 and PCs respectively. Destructoid writer Chris Carter found himself uninterested in the assassination targets, being more interested in the level and environment itself. He felt it evoked the vibes of Sapienza, while praising the RFID gimmick. IGN writer Luke Reilly praised it as one of the best levels in the 2016 Hitman, calling it "vintage Hitman at its most creative" as well as "atmospheric and tricky." PC Gamer writer Phil Savage praised it for how it made the systems and level design work together so thoroughly as well as how "confident and experimental" it was. Savage considered it his all-time favorite stage in the series due in part to the RFID mechanic. Push Square writer Sam Brooke felt that, while it wasn't the perfect ending to Hitman, it was a "nice swansong," calling it the most "atmospheric and creative" of all the episodes. Hardcore Gamer writer Adam Beck praised the atmosphere and level design, as well as the gameplay, but found the plot anticlimactic Kotaku writer Riley MacLeod praised it as a finale due to it not feeling like a finale. He discussed how the level is strange and challenging due to how much information certain NPCs have, citing a moment when he was disguised as a patient and a guard caught him wandering outside. He felt that the level's "long, subtle burn" contrasted with the previous episode, Colorado, which was more "upfront aggression."

PC Gamer staff ranked it as the third best level in the World of Assassination trilogy. Writer Fraser Brown appreciated how it started off relatively uncomplicated, but only grew more complicated as he uncovered it. Paste Magazine writer Hamish Black ranked it as the fourth best level in the game, praising the variety of strategies you could employ as well the atmosphere. However, they felt that, with there being less area to explore and going back to the two-target system, it makes Hokkaido feel anticlimactic.Hardcore Gamer writer Adam Beck ranked Hokkaido as the second best mission in Hitman 2, feeling that the size was just right and that Japan is a good choice for a level. TechRadar writers Samuel Roberts and James Peckman ranked it as the fifth best level in the World of Assassination trilogy, with James praising it for shaking things up by making a level that's more restrictive and challenging to navigate.
