= Cleanse =

Cleanse may refer to:

- Cleanse (Joywave album), a 2022 album by Joywave
- The Cleanse, a 2016 American film directed by Bobby Miller
- "Cleanse", a song by Neurosis from their 1993 album Enemy of the Sun
- An alternative medicine approach that proponents claim rids the body of toxins; see Detoxification § Detox diet

== See also ==
- Cleanliness, the state of being clean and free from dirt
- Cleansing (disambiguation), the process of making something clean and pure
