= Window Cleaner =

Window Cleaner or variation may refer to:

- Window cleaner or window washer, a person who cleans windows
- Cleaning agent, a class of product used to clean windows
- The Window Cleaner (song), a British comedic song by George Formby, first performed in 1936
- The Window Cleaner (film), a 1968 British short film
- Window Cleaners (film), a 1940 Donald Duck animated short film by Disney

== See also ==
- Window (disambiguation)
- Cleaner (disambiguation)
