= Hokkaido (disambiguation) =

Hokkaido is an island and prefecture in Japan. Hokkaido may also refer to:

- Hokkaido (dog breed), dog breed from Japan
- Dosanko, type of pony also referred to as the Hokkaido pony
- Hokkaido (Hitman), location in the Hitman series
- Hokkaido, cultivar of Red kuri squash
