= Hitman 2 =

Hitman 2 may refer to the following titles in the Hitman franchise:

- Hitman 2: Silent Assassin, a 2002 game developed by IO Interactive
- Hitman 2 (2018 video game), a 2018 game developed by IO Interactive
- Hitman: Agent 47, the second film adaptation of the series

Other films

- Hitman 2, a 2025 South Korean action comedy film sequel to 2020 film Hitman: Agent Jun

== See also ==
- Hitman (disambiguation)
