= Sapienza (Hitman) =

Hitman location

- Hitman location
- A panoramic view of Sapienza as seen in Hitman (2016)
- First appearance: Hitman - Episode 2: Sapienza (2016)
- Last appearance: Hitman 3 (2021)
- Created by: Torbjørn Christensen
- Genre: Stealth

In-universe information
- Location: Italy
- Characters: Silvio Caruso; Francesca De Santis; Dr. Oscar Lafayette; Sal Falcone

Sapienza is a fictional Italian town from IO Interactive's Hitman video game franchise. First appearing in Episode 2: Sapienza of the 2016 video game Hitman, Sapienza was modeled after the Ligurian comune Vernazza and Portofino as well as various towns along the Amalfi Coast in Southern Italy, and is similarly presented as a popular tourist destination like its real life counterparts. The levels of Hitman were originally released in episodic format, with Episode 2: Sapienza following Episode 1: Paris. In Episode 2, the player character Agent 47 travels to Sapienza in order to terminate a deadly biological weapon and its creator. Players may take advantage of "Opportunities", story driven threads scattered around the level that 47 can use to manipulate and kill targets. The sparsely populated town's peaceful environment and relaxed "siesta" ambience is intended to offer freedom of exploration, a deliberate choice to let players discover at their own pace weapons, secret routes and story threads that they could leverage in order to achieve the main objectives. Sapienza reappears in further levels which were subsequently introduced by Hitman developers, such as the bonus episode "The Icon", where the town center is reimagined as a movie set run by an assassination target.

Episode 2 and its Sapienza level is often cited as the standard against which subsequent Hitman episodes from the World of Assassination trilogy of Hitman video games released between 2016 and 2021 are compared to, as well as one of the best video game levels from the 2010s. The fictional town of Sapienza itself has been lauded by critics for its intricate and inventive design. The positive reception from critics and players towards Episode 2: Sapienza convinced its developers that their approach towards sandbox game design for the series as well as overall handling of the Hitman franchise were headed in the appropriate creative direction.

== Development ==
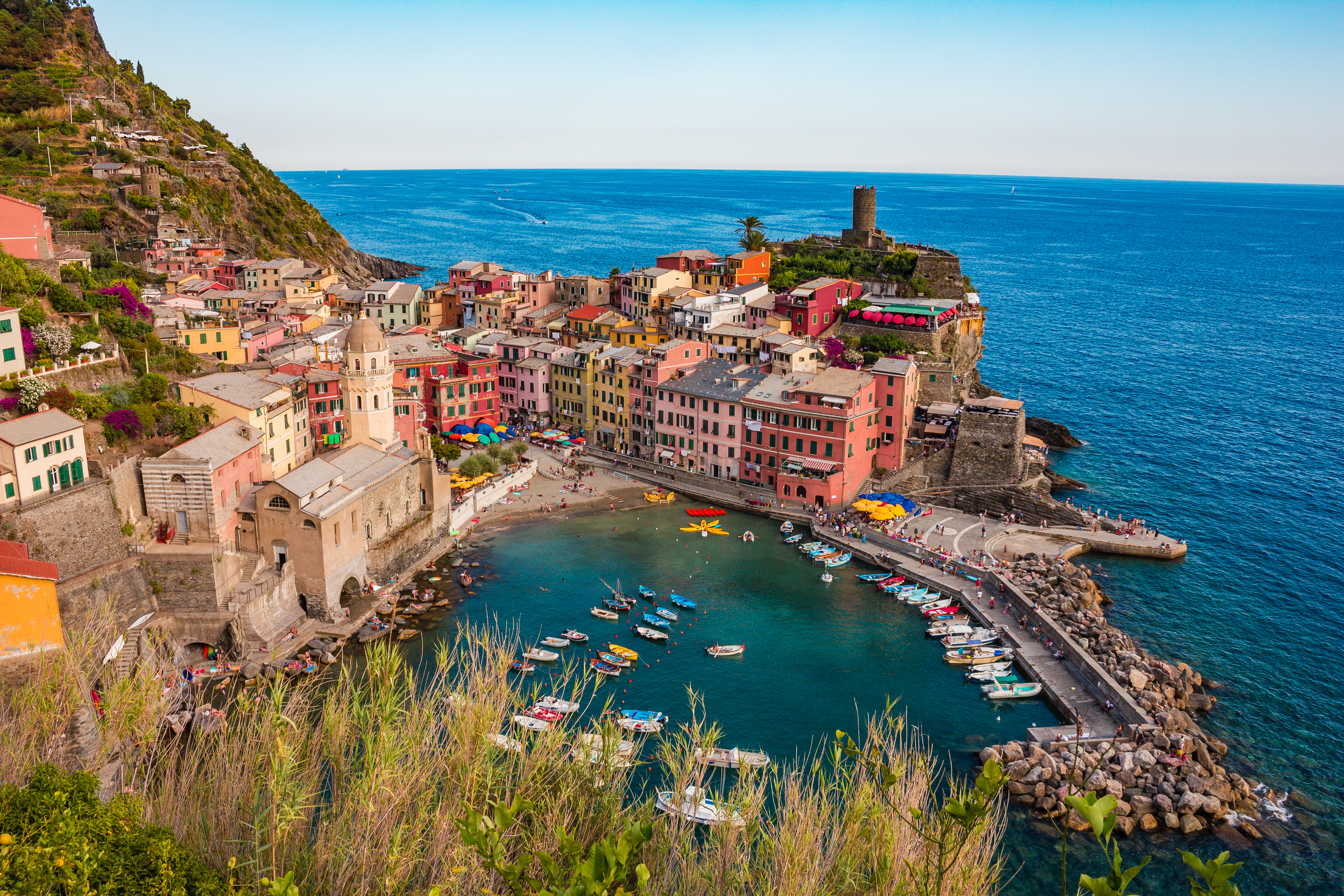
Some of Sapienza's geographical features and landmarks resemble that of Vernazza's.

Sapienza is the setting of Episode 2: Sapienza of 2016's Hitman, the first entry in a trilogy of video games referred to as the World of Assassination by Danish video game developer IO Interactive, the owner and developer of the Hitman video game franchise. Episode 2 was developed in parallel with Episode 1: Paris: both levels share the creative vision of being built around exclusivity and the idea that Agent 47 is able to infiltrate any location. The open, relaxed and casual daytime aesthetic of Sapienza was also a partial response to the night-time gala ambience embodied by the enclosed Paris fashion show, its bright and vibrant atmosphere contrasting the muted lighting and soft colours of its immediate predecessor. According to Torbjørn Christensen, lead level designer of the World of Assassination series, the core concept of Episode 2 began with "Coastal Town" and was the only direction they had in the beginning of development. This allowed the team much freedom in order to be creative. An Italian-themed setting was eventually chosen, which became the Sapienza level. Along with another colleague who worked as an environment artist, Christensen spent about two weeks mocking up a rough version during a summer holiday trip, where the good weather provided ample inspiration for Christensen. Christensen based Sapienza's look on towns along the Amalfi Coast, using both the colourful buildings and what he considered to be unusual topography. The team never traveled to Italy on a field trip in order to create Sapienza's in-game locales; instead, much of the research was done remotely using YouTube and Google Street View of Vernazza and other similar towns along the Coast. Of particular interest to them was the exploration of verticality in coastal towns and how streets and corridors would connect everything within such a place.

The team placed a lot of importance on attention to detail and worked meticulously over details that most players would not perceive such as the thickness of a medieval wall in Sapienza or realism of animation work. Using 47's potential defenestration of a target as an example, Christensen emphasized that overall impression of the level's space is very important. In an interview, he noted that if a structure looks like it cannot objectively hold its own weight or if 47's animation for throwing someone out of a window somehow does not accommodate the thickness of a medieval wall, players will notice the incongruence, which will provoke a negative subliminal reaction from within themselves. Citing positive feedback from Italian players, Christensen also claimed that Sapienza's imitation of the Italian coastal town aesthetic is said to be quite authentic or convincing. The developers initially decided that the main assassination target should be an Italian mafia boss living in a large mansion, which then spawned the concept of a secret cave under the mansion where various illegal activities would be conducted by his underlings. The developers visualized 47 infiltrating the mansion as if he would a palace: it may have different floors, a basement, an attic, with main and rear entrances and an adjacent garden.

The level design approach behind Sapienza, with larger environments than levels seen in 2006's Hitman: Blood Money combined with dense populations of non-player characters used in Hitman: Absolution, is considered a bold departure from IO's previous work as the company had never before created a video game level on such a scale. A distinctive feature of the level involve containing the main objectives in the mansion's premises, but the surrounding town area is filled with side content. The intricate, segmented nature of the mansion's private areas are contrasted with the surrounding Sapienza public area, a sprawling town that has no clear boundaries on where the level starts and stops. According to Elverdam, Sapienza represents the pinnacle of a "Swiss Cheese design", which utilizes the impression of a volume of content that is constructed meticulously and filled with connections. He explained that the reason Sapienza feels larger than it is in terms of square meters is that aspects of the level are like "spirals" or a "snail house", with walls wrapping around themselves and their layers interconnected with slopes and stairways. Elverdam explained that regardless of which direction the player takes, they could go in any direction but should never find themselves lost. Since the pathways are designed in such a way that players can keep a constant movement ahead all the time, they will eventually emerge at the other end of the "cheese" to either find a way to progress their current objective or another opportunity with a different solution. In this way, there are no dead ends in the level and players are not forced to backtrack if they do not wish to. Elverdam conceded the team were initially concerned about the density in small pockets of the level, but felt that it ultimately worked out as there is still ample amount of space where players can "breathe" and not feel claustrophobic.

Playtesting was a crucial part of the development process and helped the team refine many aspects of the level. An important change following playtesting feedback was to the routes a target will travel and repeat, otherwise known as target loops. For example, Francesca De Santis was originally supposed to wander around the town, with detours to the church and the cave as part of her main loop. The travel times between those locations were determined to be overly long, which tested the patience of playtesters in waiting for the character to do her loop. As a result, the main loops for both assassination targets were shortened and confined to the mansion. Post-release feedback towards aspects of the Sapienza level is also something the developers take seriously, with player feedback about the termination of Caruso's virus named by Creative Director Christian Elverdam as an example.

In contrast to the non-linear gameplay surrounding the main assassination targets which provides high replay value, 47's mission to destroy the virus is linear in nature as it can only be accomplished using a singular approach, which meant that players may be less enthusiastic about the mission objective in subsequent playthroughs. It was also the first time the team had built the mission around an objective that is not a human target, which Elverdam believed had given players a sentiment that it is not a gratifying task to complete. To Elverdam, the experience serve as a reminder for the team to be mindful of how there could be room for improvement for designing mission objectives for future levels. The feedback from players who said they felt forced to go down to the lab to destroy the virus every time they played the Sapienza level influenced the development of the New York DLC level from Hitman 2, which is set in a bank. Once IO had decided to make breaking into the vault found on the level an objective of the mission, they chose to let players decide to either break into the vault or instead collect a series of data disks carried by various characters.

The town square of Sapienza and its streets are turned into a trespassing zone for the duration of "The Icon", a creative decision which the IO team would never do otherwise because the mission's circumstances justifies the area's closure to the public. Besides presenting a set of challenges for the player, the film set also allowed the team to introduce an unusual story element in the form of a "robot invasion in Italy".

=== Characters ===
The Italian scientist Silvio Caruso originally filled the role of the mafia boss; his profession was altered in the final version of the level. As a result of the thematic change, the original underground gangster hideout envisioned by IO was repurposed as a secret laboratory where research and maintenance of the virus is conducted. The changes pleased Elverdam as it present a cohesive theme with 47's mission of stopping a biological weapon, though Christensen was disappointed on a personal level as he wanted to develop a full-fledged "mafia fantasy'. Elverdam noted that the designers and writers often work back and forth on the story and thematic elements of each mission. For him, contrast is a key tool in creating atmosphere and adding environmental context, with one example cited is the discrepancies between the idyllic setting and Caruso’s internal turmoil. The team still wanted to depict Caruso with stereotypically Italian traits, like being a hot tempered "mamma's boy" who is emotionally attached to his mother and her cooking.

Caruso, and the other characters in the level, do not speak with an Italian accent; according to Elverdam, while the team liked the idea of "globe-trotting", they faced limitations around finding foreign languages and appropriate accents.

Some of the story threads designed to eliminate Caruso often lean upon his relationship with his late mother, or his mental health issues. Elverdam noted that feedback from many players of Sapienza indicate that they did not necessarily feel comfortable killing Caruso because of his humanizing qualities. He states that Caruso's sincere connection to his mother and his backstory as a victim of bullying made him more interesting and complex and this moral ambiguity made the character a "deeper target" compared to what they had done before. Ultimately Elverdam believes this produced a better outcome than if his characterization had remained as a typical gangster leader.

== Level content ==
Sapienza is presented as a scenic coastal town, with a sprawling maze of narrow streets punctuated by explorable buildings. A major landmark of Sapienza is a large clifftop mansion, with an attached observatory and secret underground laboratory, that is built over a site of old castle ruins.

"World of Tomorrow" is the mission title of Episode 2, which is centered around the elimination of a biological weapon, a deadly virus created by Silvio Caruso, housed within the underground laboratory as well as the assassinations of Caruso and his colleague Francesca De Santis. Players have the option to follow story threads called "Opportunities" which benefit players in numerous ways, such as disguising 47 to allow him to hide in plain sight, triggering events to lure out his targets, or staging incidents that kill the targets without alerting others to his presence or involvement in the assassination. Disguising himself by impersonating certain important non-player characters (NPCs) allows 47 to get close to Caruso and De Santis in order to carry out the assassinations without any witnesses. Example characters include Dr. Oscar Lafayette, a psychologist assigned to treat Caruso's mental health, and Sal Falcone, a private detective from Milan who serves as an informant for De Santis. Like other episodes in the Hitman series, Episode 2 is designed for repeated playthroughs in multiple configurations.

Other alternate missions which feature the Sapienza setting include Escalation and Elusive Target missions, which offer additional complications for players to consider and overcome. One particularly notable elusive target featured on the map is real-life actor Gary Busey, which was the result of a marketing campaign named "Choose Your Hit" in which players voted to "kill" either Gary Busey or Gary Cole. There are also 3 bonus missions in Sapienza all set on different sections of the map. "The Icon" is a mission set around the Town Square that has been repurposed into a filming location, and requires the assassination of the film director for its completion. "Landslide" is another bonus mission that acts as prequel in which Agent 47 is hired by Silvio Caruso to eliminate a local politician running for mayor during his campaign rally being held at the beach. "The Author" mission released as part of the "Patient Zero" campaign is set around a book reading in the church during which a famous author plans to meet a cult member to exchange a viral weapon prototype. 47 is tasked with eliminating both targets and retrieving the viral sample.

== Reception ==
=== Initial reception ===
Hitman - Episode 2: Sapienza

Aggregate score
Aggregator	Score
Metacritic	(PC) 84/100 (PS4) 84/100 (XONE) 79/100

Review scores
Publication	Score
Destructoid	8/10
GameRevolution	9/10
GameSpot	7/10
Hardcore Gamer	8/10
IGN	8.5/10
PC Gamer (US)	8.5/10
USgamer	4.5/5
The Telegraph	5/5 stars

Episode 2: Sapienza, which marked the first appearance of the Sapienza location, received generally favorable reviews from video game publications on all release platforms according to review aggregator platform Metacritic. Much of the positive commentary highlighted the level's sense of scale, the setting's beautiful aesthetics, and the mission objectives' vast replay value. Sam White from The Telegraph gave Episode 2 a perfect score, and called Sapienza a "fabulously strong episode, and one of the series’ greatest hits". Episode 2 also received very positive reviews from publications such as IGN, PC Gamer, Game Revolution, and US Gamer.

Conversely, staff writers from Hardcore Gamer, Destructoid, and Kotaku highlighted concerns over the level's technical issues and mandatory online connectivity. GameSpot criticized the level's mediocre AI and animations and repetition of "the same old spy tricks" from a previous level. Gareth Damian Martin from Killscreen found the lack of Italian accents for the English dialogue spoken by the level's non-player characters to be immersion breaking, particularly when contrasted with the attention to detail for the level's environments. Jeff Marchiafava was unimpressed with the level: he found fault with the episodic release format, the persistent issues surrounding publisher Square Enix's online servers, and insisted that "bigger isn't necessarily better" in response to the sheer size of the Sapienza level.

=== Retrospective commentary ===
The Sapienza level and setting is cited as an influential factor for the Hitman franchise, attracting widespread praise in the years after the release of Episode 2. PC Gamer staff ranked Sapienza among the best video game levels of the year 2016. Samuel Roberts from PC Gamer described Sapienza as "classic" Hitman albeit with "an unprecedented level of environmental detail". He called it a turning point creatively for IO Interactive, proving that the studio was capable of producing "quality assassination sandboxes" following the divisive critical reception to Absolution and a controversial episodic release plan for the 2016 Hitman title. Roberts concluded that Sapienza "marked the true rebirth of Hitman", and a high watermark for the rest of the episodic 2016 series. Jack de Quidt from The Guardian, who gave the complete version of the 2016 Hitman a perfect score in his review article dated January 2017, declared Sapienza as its standout level. Caty McCarthy from US Gamer thoroughly enjoyed the setting of Sapienza and expressed disappointment that Hitman 2, the direct sequel to 2016's Hitman, will no longer be released in episodic format. She expressed a hope that Hitman 2 would feature level design as intricate and varied as that of its predecessor, which in her view is exemplified by IO's work on Sapienza.

The development of Sapienza became the subject of a 2017 feature article spanning multiple pages by Phil Savage of PC Gamer. Sapienza was the personal choice of Fraser Brown, also from PC Gamer, for the best video game level of the 2010s decade. Brown found Sapienza to be "particularly special" due to the variety of activities contained within Episode 2 alone, which could have been divided into at least three other levels within another video game title. He believed that Sapienza, a "frankly ridiculous murder sandbox", indicated that IO learned from their mistakes with Absolution, even if the episodic release model was met with an initially divisive response. Martin Kitts agreed that Sapienza is a high point for the Hitman series, but criticized the third objective that involves the infiltration of the underground laboratory to destroy the virus, which he described as approaching "a little close to becoming a chore" compared to the level's other aspects.

Commenting on the overall favorable feedback towards the Sapienza level, Elverdam believed that an important achievement by the team is a "belief in the Hitman sandbox" which dated back to 2006's Hitman: Blood Money; Elverdam claimed that the team was unsure there was still an audience for this style of game design, and that Sapienza was an instructive experience on how to build such a level and find an audience with players who might like it. Elverdam remarked that the team felt reassured by the positive reception towards their design choices for the levels of the World of Assassination trilogy, and encouraged a willingness to experiment with some of the other levels like Episode 5: Colorado and Episode 6: Hokkaido.

Sapienza has routinely been placed very highly in retrospective rankings of all 21 levels in the World of Assassination trilogy and rankings of all the levels in the Hitman franchise as a whole. Kotaku and TechRadar both ranked it as the best mission of the World of Assassination trilogy while PC Gamer placed it second behind Hitman 2's Miami mission, The A.V. Club placed it 3rd and Rock Paper Shotgun placed it 5th. Game Rant ranked it as the best level out of the 14 levels from 2016's Hitman and 2018's Hitman 2. The Digital Fix ranked Sapienza as the best Hitman level of the whole franchise in a ranking published just before the release of Hitman 3. The Gamer later ranked it as the second best level in the franchise behind 'A New Life' from Hitman: Blood Money.
