= CLEAN =

CLEAN may refer to:

- Component Validator for Environmentally Friendly Aero Engine
- CLEAN (algorithm), a computational algorithm used in astronomy to perform a deconvolution on dirty images
- Commonwealth Law Enforcement Assistance Network, a system used by law enforcement and other criminal justice agencies in Pennsylvania which interfaces NCIC, Penndot and other sources beneficial to law enforcement personnel. Operated by the Pennsylvania State Police.
- Cryogenic Low-Energy Astrophysics with Noble gases, a liquid argon dark matter detector under construction at SNOLAB.

== See also ==
- Clean (disambiguation)
