= Cleaning (disambiguation) =

Cleaning is the process of removing unwanted substances, such as dirt, infectious agents, and other impurities, from an object or environment.

Cleaning may also refer to:

== Digital technology ==
- Data cleansing or data cleaning, the process of detecting and correcting (or removing) corrupt or inaccurate records from a record set, table, or database
- Data scrubbing, an error correction technique applied to main memory or storage
- Infrared cleaning, a technique used by some film scanners and flatbed scanners to reduce or remove the effect of dust and scratches upon the finished scan
- Sanitization (classified information), the removal of sensitive information from a document or other message

== Other uses ==
- Cleaning (forestry), the practice of selecting desirable trees in a young stand and removing trees that threaten their development
  - Silviculture cleaning, the release of select saplings from competition by overtopping trees of a comparable age
- Organizing, as in professional organizing

== See also ==
- Clean (disambiguation)
- Cleanliness
- Cleansing (disambiguation)
