= Clean =

Clean may refer to:

- Cleaning, the process of removing unwanted substances, such as dirt, infectious agents, and other impurities, from an object or environment
- Cleanliness, the state of being clean and free from dirt

== Arts and media ==
=== Music ===
==== Albums ====
- Clean (Cloroform album), 2007
- Clean (Deitiphobia album), 1994
- Clean (Severed Heads album), 1981
- Clean (Shane & Shane album), 2004
- Clean (Soccer Mommy album), 2018
- Clean (The Japanese House EP), second EP by English indie pop act The Japanese House
- Clean (Whores EP), second EP by American rock band Whores
- Clean, an Edwin Starr album

==== Songs ====
- "Clean" (song), by Taylor Swift from her album 1989, also covered by Ryan Adams from his album 1989
- "Clean", a song by Depeche Mode from their 1990 album Violator
- "Clean", a song by Helmet from their 1994 album Betty
- "Clean", a song by Robbie Williams from his 1997 album Life thru a Lens
- "Clean", a song by Incubus from their 1999 album Make Yourself
- "Clean", a song by Everclear from their 2006 album Welcome to the Drama Club
- "Clean", a song by KSI and Randolph from their 2019 album New Age
- "Clean", a song by Pale Waves from their 2022 album Unwanted

==== Other uses in music ====
- Clean, an amplifier sound in guitar terminology
- Clean vocals, a term used for singing to distinguish it from unclean vocals, such as screaming or growling
- Clean, a term used for the edited or censored version of a piece of media; see Parental Advisory#Application
- The Clean, an influential first-wave indie rock band

=== Other uses in arts, entertainment, and media ===
- Clean (2004 film), a 2004 French drama film directed by Olivier Assayas
- Clean (2021 film), a 2021 American crime drama film directed by Paul Solet
- "Clean" (Band of Gold), a 1995 television episode
- Clean comedy (or clean performance), entertainment which avoids profanity and other objectionable material; the opposite of blue comedy

== Sports ==
- Clean and jerk, a weightlifting movement
- Clean climbing, the choice to employ non-destructive hardware and techniques in rock climbing

== Other uses ==
- Clean (programming language), a purely functional programming language
- Clean language, a questioning technique used in psychotherapy and coaching
- Money laundering, a way of cleaning "dirty" money.

== See also ==
- CLEAN (disambiguation)
- Cleaning (disambiguation)
- Mr. Clean (disambiguation)
