= Hitman (2016 video game) =

Stealth game

- Cover featuring Agent 47
- Developer: IO Interactive
- Publisher: Square Enix (Note: Feral Interactive published the macOS and Linux version; IO Interactive self-published future re-issues of the game from Square Enix, as well as the Stadia version.)
- Director: Christian Elverdam
- Producers: Markus Friedl; Ole Mogensen; Søren Raadved Lund; Alex Hillman
- Designer: Jesper Hylling
- Artist: Jonathan Row
- Writer: Michael Vogt
- Composer: Niels Bye Nielsen
- Series: Hitman
- Engine: Glacier 2
- Platforms: PlayStation 4; Windows; Xbox One; Linux; macOS; Stadia
- Release: 11 March 2016: Episode 1; 11 March 2016; Episode 2; 26 April 2016; Episode 3; 31 May 2016; Episode 4; 16 August 2016; Episode 5; 27 September 2016; Episode 6; 31 October 2016; Linux; 16 February 2017; macOS; 20 June 2017
- Genre: Stealth
- Mode: Single-player

Hitman is a 2016 stealth video game developed by IO Interactive and published by Square Enix. The game, which has six episodes, is the sixth mainline entry in the Hitman franchise, the first installment of the World of Assassination trilogy, and the successor to Hitman: Absolution (2012). The single-player story follows genetically engineered assassin Agent 47 as he goes on a worldwide adventure and solves a mysterious series of seemingly unconnected assassinations. Hitman features a number of large, open-ended sandboxes that Agent 47 can freely explore. The game presents the player with various assassination opportunities, many of which are unconventional. IO Interactive introduced a "live component" to the game with new content being regularly delivered in downloadable form.

Each episode is set in a location: Paris, Sapienza, Marrakesh, Bangkok, Colorado and Hokkaido. Square Enix Europe set up a Montréal studio to work on the next Hitman game, but IO Interactive returned to lead the game's development following the under-performance of Absolution. The title was conceived as a reimagining of the franchise as the team attempted to integrate the gameplay of Absolution with the open-endedness of earlier installments of the series. According to the team, Hitman is a puzzle game with action and stealth elements; the developers refined the simulation and artificial intelligence of each level. The game adopted an episodic model and the team envisioned the game as a service. It was marketed as a "World of Assassination" and provided a platform that would expand and evolve over time, eventually leading into a trilogy of games.

Hitman was released episodically for PlayStation 4, Windows, and Xbox One from March to October 2016. Upon release, it received positive reviews; critics praised the game's episodic release format, locations, level design, and its replayability but criticised the always-online requirement and excessive handholding. The game underperformed commercially and caused publisher Square Enix to divest from IO Interactive in May 2017. Following a management buyout, IO retained the rights to the series and developed a sequel, Hitman 2, which was released through Warner Bros. Interactive Entertainment in November 2018. The World of Assassination trilogy concluded with Hitman 3, which was self-published by IO Interactive in January 2021. In January 2023, Hitman was delisted from sales after IO Interactive rebranded Hitman 3 as Hitman: World of Assassination, (Note: The World of Assassination branding was originally used for the Stadia release of Hitman 2, and later Hitman 3.) with the contents of the previous two Hitman games becoming available to Hitman 3 owners, free of charge.

== Gameplay ==
In this gameplay screenshot, Agent 47 is disguised as a fashion model in the Paris map.

Hitman is a stealth video game in which players control a genetically enhanced assassin called Agent 47 from a third-person perspective as he carries out assassinations of various targets across the globe. As in other games in the Hitman series, players have a large amount of freedom in their approach to their assassinations. Players may use weapons including explosives, pistols, assault rifles, and long-range sniper rifles; they may also assassinate the target at close range using bladed weapons or throwable items.

Agent 47 is vulnerable in a firefight; thus, eliminating targets silently is preferred. He can use his specially equipped garrote wire to strangle his victims or disguise his killings as accidental deaths, such as poisoning the target's food or drowning them in a toilet. The game also includes scripted opportunities that require the completion of multiple tasks. Players can eavesdrop on conversations from non-playable characters (NPCs) to obtain clues about the location and routine of targets, and uncover opportunities for creative infiltration and elimination. For example, Agent 47 can tamper with a chandelier, causing it to fall and kill a target. 47 can collect items to use as improvised weapons, access previously restricted areas, knock out NPCs, or create distractions. Completion of mission challenges, such as killing targets in unconventional ways, discovering unique items, and gaining access to new areas, enables players to progress through the mastery levels for each location, with rewards such as advanced weapons and gadgets, agency pick-up locations for stashing gear, and new starting locations for that level.

Each episode in the game features a sandbox-type environment the player can freely explore. Players can incapacitate specific NPCs and wear their clothes as disguises, which allow Agent 47 to access restricted areas, initiate conversations with targets or other NPCs, and perform actions that would otherwise be highly suspicious. Some NPCs, referred to as "Enforcers", will see through 47's disguises. Agent 47 can try to blend in to prevent this from happening. Levels can accommodate about 300 NPCs, each of which reacts to the player's actions differently and has their own unique routines. Acting strangely, such as crouching or taking cover in a crowd, will raise suspicions. If 47 tries to enter a restricted area, he may have to be frisked by guards, requiring him to discard weapons or illegal items before being searched. The artificial intelligence (AI) of NPCs has several alert phases. Guards will escort Agent 47 from a restricted area if he is found trespassing and his disguise may be compromised if a NPC sees him perform an illegal action. An alert guard will first try to arrest 47, but if he resists or tries to run, they will open fire on him. Guards can be distracted and Agent 47 can hide the bodies of incapacitated individuals and other evidence to avoid alerting other NPCs. Agent 47 can also enter Instinct Mode, which highlights the locations of the targets, as well as useful items, guards, and other important information. After eliminating his target(s), Agent 47 needs to locate an exit to complete a mission. A player's mission performance review is rated with a five-star rating system and is influenced by factors such as time elapsed, the number of non-target NPCs killed, sightings of 47 performing illegal activities, appearances on CCTV cameras, and discoveries of victims' bodies.

IO Interactive introduced a "live component" to Hitman; new content, which was regularly delivered in downloadable form, includes time-limited missions called "Elusive Targets". If a player fails to kill an elusive target before the mission expires, or alerts targets and allows them to escape, the targets will not return. Players are rewarded for successful killings with cosmetic rewards. Unlike the main game, players cannot save their games when they are completing the Elusive Target missions. "Escalation Contracts", which are contracts created by the developers, include stages that require players to complete tasks such as assassinating a target using a specific weapon or disguise. By completing a stage, players progress through the escalation and the level of difficulty will increase with new challenges to comply with or changes to the level. Hitman: Absolution's Online Contracts mode also returns in Hitman, allowing players to assign up to five NPCs as assassination targets, set requirements for their killings, and share their contracts with and compete with other players.

== Synopsis ==
In 1999, an unnamed man is initiated into the International Contract Agency (ICA) and demonstrates exceptional aptitude as an assassin. The ICA is unable to verify his background or uncover any information about him, which disturbs Erich Soders, the ICA's training director. With the help of his handler, Diana Burnwood, the initiate passes a final test that Soders had rigged against him. The director reluctantly approves the initiate for field duty and washes his hands of the matter. The man tells Diana to call him "47" and leaves to await further instructions; this prologue leads into the events of Codename 47, the first game in the series.

Twenty years later, 47 completes a series of contracts provided by Diana, who has risen to a senior position in the ICA. At first, the contracts appear to be unrelated, but Diana gradually uncovers information that an unknown individual referred to as the "Shadow Client" has covertly coordinated these contracts to attack a secretive organization called "Providence", whose existence and total control over global affairs were thought to be a myth. The Shadow Client uses the ICA and 47 to kill Providence agents, making the ICA appear culpable and hiding his own involvement. The game ends with Diana being approached by a representative of Providence, who requests that the ICA deal with the Shadow Client.

=== Plot ===
The Shadow Client performs an assassination for Viktor Novikov, a fashion mogul and head of the international spy ring IAGO, and receives a copy of all of IAGO's files as payment. Using the files to identify Providence's secret operations, the Client sends an anonymous warning to MI6 of an impending IAGO auction of a stolen non-official cover (NOC) list that will take place at a Paris fashion show by Novikov's label, Sanguine. As a result, MI6 hires 47 to prevent the sale; he assassinates Novikov and his business partner, IAGO's true leader, Dalia Margolis, at the fashion show.

The Client sets two more ICA contracts in motion to disrupt Providence's activities without exposing himself. He first discloses a secret project to develop a deadly weaponized virus to a disgruntled shareholder in the Ether Biotech Corporation, knowing that the shareholder will then hire 47 to assassinate Silvio Caruso and Francesca De Santis, the scientists in charge of the project, and destroy the virus prototype housed at Caruso's private lab in the fictitious Italian town of Sapienza. Providence dispatches an agent to investigate the incident; the Client ambushes and kills him, and takes a key in his possession.

The second contract involves the Client disclosing an impending military coup in Morocco to Hamilton-Lowe, an international contractor with lucrative Moroccan government contracts. The company hires 47 to eliminate General Reza Zaydan, the mastermind of the coup, and fugitive bank CEO Claus Hugo Strandberg—both of whom are undercover Providence operatives—in Marrakesh. As 47 completes the contract, the Client breaches a Providence vault in New York City and steals valuable information on Providence's assets and operatives. The leaders of Providence realize that a coordinated attack has been launched against them.

The Client puts a third ICA contract in motion to reveal another Providence member, the reclusive media tycoon Thomas Cross. Cross had ordered a coverup that enabled his son, famed indie rock singer Jordan Cross, to escape legal consequences for the murder of his girlfriend Hannah Highmoore by disguising her death as an apparent accident; the Client reveals the truth to her family. The Highmoores hire 47 to kill Jordan Cross and Ken Morgan, the Cross family lawyer and fellow Providence member who oversaw the coverup, while both are staying at a private resort in Bangkok. Deploying forces from a private militia under his control, the Client kidnaps Thomas Cross from Jordan's funeral and kills him, then steals billions of dollars from his offshore bank accounts. The ICA, realizing an unknown party has benefited from the Cross contract, re-examines 47's previous contracts and discovers the Client's role in setting them up.

The ICA learns of a training camp for the Client's militia, based in an old industrial farm in rural Colorado. Seeking to eliminate the Client for his manipulation, the agency orders a premature operation due to the intervention of Soders, a member of ICA's executive board. 47 is sent to the camp to eliminate the militia's leader, eco-terrorist Sean Rose and three other key militia members. 47 discovers a secret room filled with the Client's research, revealing both the connections of the previous contracts to Providence and the Client's obsession with 47 himself. Diana also discovers that Soders is a mole for Providence and has been manipulating the agency on their behalf. The Client, who has been secretly tracking 47, uses this opportunity to go into hiding.

47 assassinates Soders and his Providence liaison, yakuza associate and fixer Yuki Yamazaki, at a hospital in Hokkaido, where Soders is set to receive needed medical treatment in exchange for a list of all active ICA operatives. Subsequently, Providence uncovers the Client's role in the attacks. An unnamed Providence member approaches Diana on a train, seeking to hire the ICA to target the Client. Diana refuses but starts to reconsider when the Providence member offers to reveal information about 47's past.

=== The Sarajevo Six ===
In this alternative storyline, 47 receives contracts to assassinate the six former members of Sigma, a deniable operations paramilitary unit of the private military contractor Cicada, who committed war crimes during the siege of Sarajevo but evaded prosecution by the International Criminal Tribunal for the former Yugoslavia. 47 tracks each Sigma member—starting with the group's former commander and working his way down—to all six of the main mission settings, with the events and characters of each location serving as backdrops. As the missions progress, security increases and the targets become more paranoid and cautious, increasing the difficulty.

For the final contract, 47 is sent to a hospital in Hokkaido to both eliminate the final Sigma member, Taheiji Koyama, and retrieve files documenting the unit's operations from the hospital's records. If 47 chooses to approach the target, Koyama will reveal that he financed the contracts, wanting to get justice for Sigma's victims. Now that he is dying from a terminal illness, Koyama instructs 47 to publicize the files after killing him. 47 honors Koyama's request, but both he and Diana conclude that public indifference will likely relegate Sigma's atrocities to obscurity.

=== Patient Zero ===
A doomsday cult that masquerades as a self-help group, named "Liberation", is using an upcoming exhibition at a luxury resort in Bangkok to provide cover for a bio-weapon attack. 47 receives a contract from a mysterious billionaire using the alias "Locksley" to eliminate the cult's leader Oybek Nabazov and his second-in-command, Sister Yulduz. As 47 makes his escape, Diana notices a series of digital messages being transmitted from the resort's network, which are revealed to be signals meant to activate the cult's sleeper agents worldwide as a contingency once Nabazov's death is confirmed.

The ICA identifies two sleeper agents, Brother Akram and celebrity author Craig Black, who are meeting at a private event in Sapienza to exchange a weapon identical to the one in Bangkok, which 47 retrieves after eliminating the targets. ICA intel then confirms the origin of another signal, which leads to a mercenary camp in Colorado where Dr. Bradley Paine, a CDC specialist and secret cult member, has already begun infecting personnel. Forced to maintain his distance to prevent infection, 47 assassinates Paine with a sniper rifle, along with four victims of the Nabazov virus.

Diana's analysts intercept a memo, indicating Japanese authorities have recently detained a man on a flight to Australia who showed signs of infection, and have ordered him to be quarantined at a hospital in Hokkaido. 47 infiltrates the hospital to eliminate the man, who is identified as Owen Cage, a radical virus researcher who helped design the Nabazov virus and infected himself with the intention of becoming patient zero. An additional target is Klaus Liebleid, an Ether scientist overseeing the quarantine effort while secretly trying to extract as much information about the virus as he can, so that Ether can reverse engineer Cage's work and profit from it. Despite Cage being kept in isolation, the virus can spread to other people and 47 must kill all infected individuals, if such a scenario arises, to eliminate the virus. During the debriefing, 47 and Diana note that the entire plot was beyond the scope of a cult, implying that Liberation was backed by a higher power. With the contract closed, the two move onto other targets.

== Development ==
=== Origin ===
Danish company IO Interactive developed all of the mainline Hitman games. Prior to the launch of Hitman: Absolution (2012), publisher and IO's owner Square Enix announced it had established a new studio named Square Enix Montréal to work on future Hitman games. Due to cutbacks and layoffs at IO Interactive, other projects were stopped and the company started working on a new Hitman game, and Square Enix Montréal focused on developing smartphone and tablet versions of Hitman and other games. Most of the members of the development team at IO Interactive only worked on Absolution, not older games of the series, such as Hitman: Blood Money (2006).

Absolution was controversial for removing many of the franchise's traditional gameplay elements and being linear rather than the large, open sandbox levels of the older games, despite being more accessible. When the team brainstormed ideas for the next entry in the franchise, they strove to integrate the gameplay of Absolution and the open levels of Blood Money. According to Christian Elverdem, this goal was "daunting" during the early stage of the game's development because they needed to upgrade their in-house Glacier game engine to accommodate these larger maps and most of the team did not have experience building sandboxes. According to Michael Vogt, the game's lead writer, the title was designed to be a "soft reboot" and a "reimagining" of the franchise. After nearly four years of development, production concluded with a total cost of over $70 million.

=== Design ===
The major story beats and the destinations were decided by a small group of development leads, after which a team would be responsible for each level's design, rules, targets, and other details to create a self-contained game world. The first level the team created, Paris, was the vertical slice for the game; it set the gameplay rules, general level design, and the number of non-playable characters for future episodes. According to Elverdem, every level is "fully simulated" and the player is free to explore and observe the behaviours of the AI. If the player eliminates a certain NPC, the simulation adjusts itself and continues to function, though it will also react to players' actions. The team listened to feedback from playtesters and adjusted the game accordingly. For instance, after some playtesters complained about the level being too punitive, the team introduced the concept of escorting, in which NPCs escort Agent 47 back to a public space if he is found trespassing, whereas in the early version, the guards would attack Agent 47.

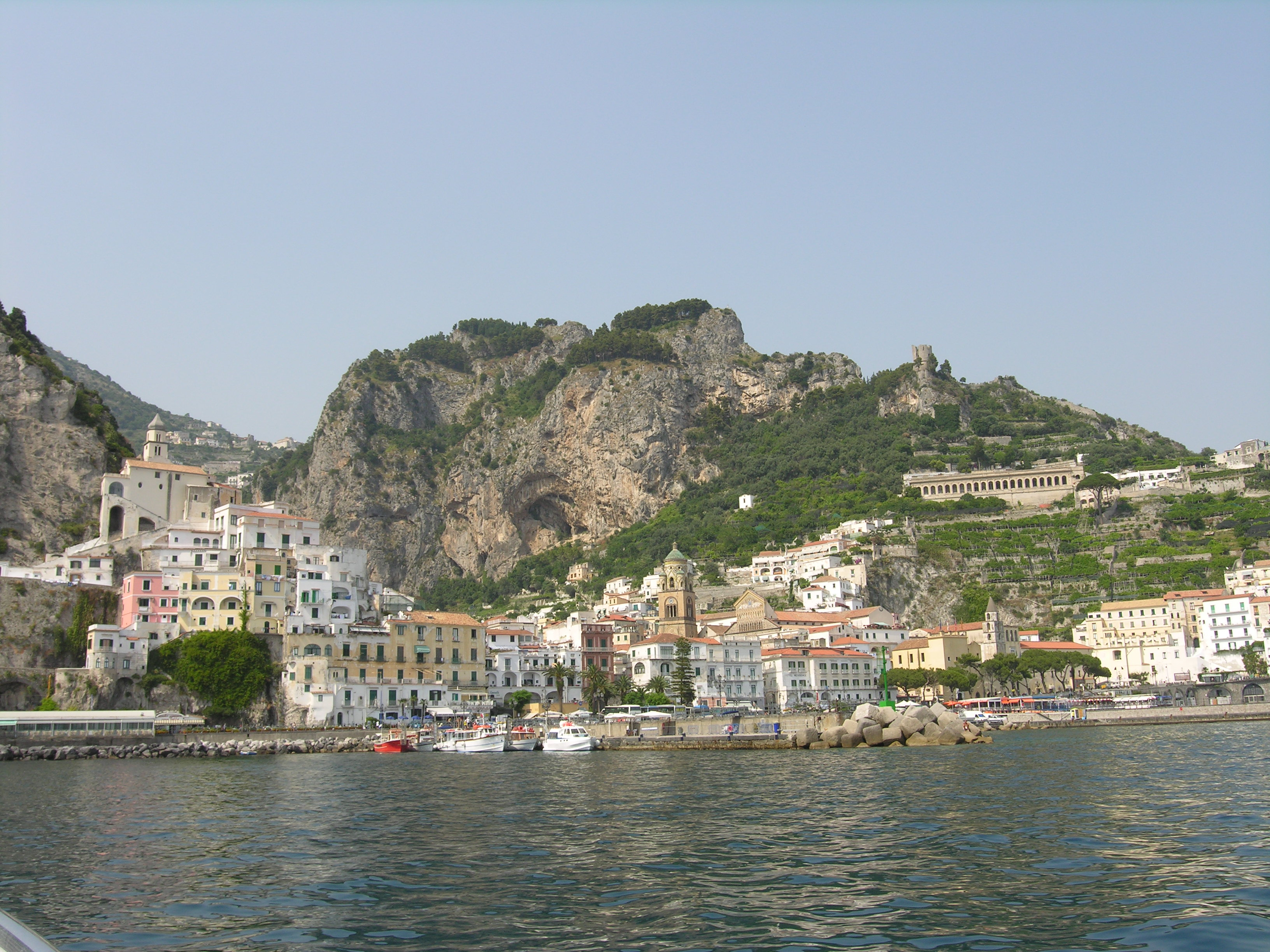
Amalfi in Italy inspired the design and the aesthetic of "Sapienza", the second episode.

The team perceived Hitman as a puzzle game with action and stealth elements; they had several major design concepts. The first concept was named "Swiss cheese"; according to the team, the term means players would be presented with an ample options, and there were multiple ways to move in and out of a level. Regardless of how the player chooses to infiltrate a place, the team made sure that there are no "visual dead ends", and that players will eventually find a new way to progress without needing to backtrack. There are two types of levels in this game; "fortress" refers to an area the player must infiltrate, and a "snailhouse" is a level that has a circular design in which players are encouraged to explore the peripheral areas to find ways to access the area in the middle of the map. The level Sapienza was developed alongside Paris and was designed as the "opposite" of it, both in level design layout and aesthetic. Inspired by Italy's Amalfi coast and the town of Vernazza, the maps feature a snailhouse design. Elverdem described this level as the "pinnacle" of the Swiss cheese design because the map has a lot of verticality and the pathways are interconnected, ensuring players will not find a dead end. According to designer Jesper Hylling, the team mainly did their location research remotely using Google Images, YouTube and Google Street View.

The team spent time into designing "believable everyday life" to ensure that players feel immersed in a level. According to the team, the team relied heavily on subtle environmental storytelling. For instance, IO's artists were instructed to write a short story for each hotel room in the Bangkok level, and tell the story using only "set dressings", how objects are placed in an environment, to indicate the personality or the circumstance of the room occupant. The team incorporated a concept known as "social stealth", in which players are expected to conform to social norms and abide by the rules in a particular setting or context to blend in. The team was inspired by sociology theories by Pierre Bourdieu, who proposed that different social spaces carry different rules, and Erving Goffman, who proposed that human behaviours will change depending on different social states and settings. Each area in a map is considered to be a microbiome that informs players the way they should act. At each level, the team balanced the proportion of public and private spaces. Players are able to freely walk around in public spaces without restrictions, which enables them to understand the "feel" of the level and discover mission opportunities, although there are certain public settings with implied social rules. The developers use these to teach players the basics of social stealth and the rules of trespassing without punishing players with gameplay penalties. There are two types of private spaces; professional spaces that often require a disguise and personal spaces in which the target can be alone. Private areas usually have distinct art assets to contrast them with public spaces, rewarding player's exploration and curiosity. The AI of targets displays two types of behaviour; some will roam around the map and others will station themselves in a private space that is off-limits to the player. This helped diversify the gameplay loop by encouraging different playstyles. According to the team, the first type of target encourages players to follow them and observe their behaviour and patterns while the latter type prompts players to find ways to infiltrate a setting or gain access to previously restricted areas.

After receiving complaints about the level being lifeless and boring from playtesters, the team introduced narrative subplots into the game with mission stories and opportunities. These elements position the players on a "rail" that will guide them to their target; this added additional challenges to the game's simulation because opportunities will disrupt the target's usual loop and players can complicate the loop by abandoning an ongoing opportunity in favour of another rail. Despite this complication, the team believed these subplots allow players to discover creative ways that change the AI loop in a meaningful and organic manner. For instance, if the Ether virus is destroyed in Sapienza, one of the targets, scientist Francesca DeSantis, will deviate from her core loop to visit the laboratory. Players can easily use this feature to manipulate the targets. Despite putting players on a rail, the team stopped giving players further instructions after they have gathered all of the information needed to carry out the hit. The team felt it encourages players to decide how to approach the targets and communicates to the player there is never a "wrong" way of killing a target.

Another result of the playtesting complaints was IO Interactive heavily expanding upon the tutorial missions set at the ICA Facility. The tutorial was designed to teach players the fundamentals of Hitman, how to operate the game and how to set their own goals. The first iteration was a series of individual test chambers where the player would be taught a single mechanic or feature at a time. However, even though this taught players how to operate the game, it was not representative of the nature of the game as an open sandbox. The redesigned tutorial consisted of a short 'Arrival' opening that teaches basic movement and camera controls, a 'Guided training' mission set on a sandbox yacht level and then an unguided 'Final Test' sandbox level. However, despite teaching the controls and the fundamentals of Hitman, developers still felt they had to teach players how to set their own goals so this led to the idea of the 'Freeform training' mission. In this mission players are asked to replay the yacht level from the 'Guided training' again but this time without any guidance and with more items such as remote explosives available to play with. Playtesters were given a list of challenges on paper that were deliberately designed to be simple and to work well together. This resulted in players setting their own goals and becoming creative in trying to complete all the different challenges.

=== Story ===
Vogt and Elverdam placed more emphasis on the game's narrative because they observed the market wanted "quality drama" following the success of The Last of Us (2013). Vogt noted there was a genre change for the franchise with Hitman (2016); unlike the previous games in the series, which are crime thrillers, the 2016 game is an "agent thriller" that was inspired by James Bond movies such as Casino Royale and has a more "adventurous and aspirational" tone than the older games, which are "cold and cynical". The team elevated the stature of Agent 47 and his targets; 47 is now travelling to luxurious and exotic locations, and assassinating targets who are social elites and powerful criminals. Elverdem said with the genre change, Agent 47 became "the guy you called for the most impossible hits under the most impossible circumstances". To make the game aspirational, it has a "stronger moral compass" than earlier games in the series so the assassinations committed by Agent 47 are more morally justifiable and make more sense in the context of the in-game universe.

Vogt described Agent 47 as a "quintessential blank slate character" and Elverdam said "since he is not anyone himself, it's easy for him to be everyone else". Agent 47's only goal is to complete his assignments. Given the nature of the character, the team cannot forcefully apply typical character arcs like hero's journey for him; the team felt this would cause ludonarrative dissonance. The team introduced other characters to accompany Agent 47 through the post-2016 Hitman games. 47's handler Diana Burnwood becomes his conscience and the Shadow Client—who is revealed as Lucas Grey in Hitman 2—serves as his emotions. These characters have genuine emotions and desires, and their actions and attitudes would slowly influence Agent 47 and facilitate his own character arc. David Bateson returned to voice Agent 47.

Vogt was initially concerned by the game's episodic format; he felt the episode would feel like "a slice of an unfinished game" if one episode features too many narrative elements. The team thus decided to include subplots within each level while the main story would slowly unfold throughout the games. This unfolding makes the game similar to a television series in which some episodes are entirely about a subplot that has no relation to the overarching narrative. Vogt said Season 1 only serves to introduce the game's characters and that the game's story would become increasingly important in later seasons. The first half of Season 1 has very little story content because the team wanted to ensure players can relate themselves to Agent 47, a merciless assassin who travels around the world to kill targets assigned to him. Because Agent 47 is a blank state character, the team strove to create a "living, breathing" world. Rather than a protagonist, Agent 47 is an intruder who observes and occasionally interrupts other people's lives. To achieve this, the team relied heavily on environmental storytelling. Art director Jonathan Rowe said the art team spent a lot of time "set dressing" every room and item to ensure each item has a reason to be there and has a tale to tell. For instance, some rooms in the Bangkok hotel are messy, communicating the story of the previous inhabitants of these rooms.

=== Online ===
Hitman is always online due to the inclusion of Elusive Targets who can only be killed once. The making of Elusive Targets did not impact the game's level design; the team used a different design philosophy compared with the main game. Players are not allowed to replay Elusive Targets because the team felt this would create a tense experience and prevent players from noticing imperfections that would make the experience less enjoyable. Elusive Targets were designed to be memorable; they do not always have connections to the main story, which gave the team more freedom to create characters that fit the setting and theme of each map. The team avoided releasing Elusive Targets in a newly released map; they wanted to give sufficient time for players to master and explore the level. The development team observed the ways players completed Elusive Targets, their play patterns and feedback, and made adjustments to make future targets more challenging. Hannes Seifert, the head of IO Interactive, described Elusive Targets as "the pulse" of the experience that has "energised" the community and boosted the game's sales. This mode was intended to provide bursts of content to the player during intervals between episodes. In July 2016, a companion app that allows players to keep track of online content released for the game was released.

In March 2016, advertising company Omelet announced they had collaborated with Square Enix for a new campaign called "Choose Your Hit". Players could vote online and through Twitter to "kill" either Gary Cole or Gary Busey; the actor who received the most votes would lend his voice and likeness to the target in an upcoming mission. A month later, it was announced Busey had won and would appear as the target in a mission that would be released in mid-2016. On 18 July 2016, Busey was announced as the seventh elusive target in the game; his mission, in which Cole also appears, would be available for seven days starting on 21 July 2016.

A mode called Contracts mode, which first appeared in Absolution, was added to Hitman. The team believed the larger maps with more NPCs in each make the experience more varied and created identifiable NPCs to make these custom targets more interesting. When Absolution launched in 2012, the online servers were unstable due to a large number of players accessing the online Contracts mode; to avoid a repeat of this incident and to ensure Hitman had a stable launch, IO Interactive improved the game's online infrastructure.

== Release ==
Square Enix, IO Interactive's parent company, published the episodes throughout 2016 as well as the downloadable and retail version Hitman: The Complete First Season. The Complete First Season, which bundles all of the game's episodes, was released on 31 January 2017. Feral Interactive released the Definitive Edition on Linux and macOS on 16 February and 20 June 2017 respectively. Because of the game's poorer-than-expected financial performance and Square Enix prioritisation of other properties, Square Enix announced in June 2017 to divest IO Interactive and allow the studio's management to buy it out.

Hitman was originally set to be released on 8 December 2015 for PlayStation 4, Windows, and Xbox One, but its release was postponed to 11 March 2016 to allow time for IO Interactive to include more content in the base game. The PlayStation 4 version of the game includes six exclusive missions known as The Sarajevo Six. Players who pre-ordered the game gained access to its beta, which was released for PlayStation 4 on 12 February and for Windows on 19 February 2016. No season pass was available at launch; the company considered the addition of paid content a "wrong approach". Players who pre-ordered the game also received a costume pack based on a mission from Blood Money and two in-game weapons. A beta was released prior to the game's official launch.

Following the buyout, independent IO Interactive retained the rights to the Hitman franchise and began self-publishing the game digitally with the released "ICA Facility", the game's prologue, as a free-to-play game in June 2017. IO Interactive then released Hitman: Game of the Year Edition on 7 November 2017 for download; the re-release includes the base game and a separate campaign named "Patient Zero", a remix of the Bangkok, Sapienza, Colorado, and Hokkaido episodes. It also includes a new costume inspired by Blood Money, and new music composed by Niels Bye Nielsen. In April 2018, IO Interactive announced to partner with Warner Bros. Interactive Entertainment to release the Game of the Year Edition for retail on 15 May 2018. The edition, which is titled Hitman: Definitive Edition, includes the campaign and the bonus episodes, as well as the "IO Interactive's 20th Anniversary Outfit Bundle", which includes outfits inspired by IO's other franchises such as Freedom Fighters, Mini Ninjas, and Kane & Lynch.

IO Interactive released the Game of the Year Edition on the GOG.com digital storefront on 22 September 2021. This release received significant backlash online and large amounts of negative user reviews on the game's store page due to the always-online requirements of the game which was felt to go against GOG's stated "DRM-free games" character. At that time, GOG stated in a forum post stating that users were free to refund the game but warned against "review bombing". They later clarified that they would only remove reviews that go against their review guidelines after pushback from forum users about the suggestion their complaints were "review bombing". The game was removed from the store on 9 October, with GOG writing in a statement "we shouldn't have released it [Hitman] in its current form".

=== Release format ===
While there was no post-launch support for Absolution, the team realised players regularly re-visited the game's Contracts mode, in which players set custom targets and share them online with other players. This mode's longevity encouraged IO Interactive to re-evaluate the release model of Hitman, which they envisioned as a "digital platform" that is similar to a Netflix series. This platform, which was marketed as the "World of Assassination", allowed IO Interactive to regularly release content without rebuilding the technology. The team believed launching the game at a lower price point with fewer levels would encourage more players to purchase it, creating positive word of mouth that would expand the game's player base. As the team released more episodes, the expected new players would convert their existing version to the full version. The team initially estimated about 80% of the purchasers would buy the episodes separately while the other 20% of them, whom they believed to be long-time fans of the series, would purchase the full-priced versions.

Originally, the game was to be released in an "intro pack" that would include all of the base content and locations, six-story missions, three sandboxes, forty "signature kills", a contracts mode with 800 targets, and access to regular events held by the developer. New missions and locations set in Thailand, the US, and Japan were to be released after the game's launch, and a full-priced version was to be released following the release of this post-release content. No downloadable content (DLC) was to be released for the game and no microtransactions were to be offered; new missions, locations, and targets were to be regularly added to the game as free post-release updates.

On 14 January 2016, it was announced Hitman would be released in an episodic manner; at its launch, the game would consist of the prologue and Paris missions. New content would be released monthly; this would include the remaining two cities of the main game (Sapienza and Marrakesh) in April and May 2016 respectively, which would be followed by the previously planned Thailand, US, and Japan expansions in late 2016. Weekly events would be held and additional content would be released between the monthly updates. These expansions would be available at no extra cost to purchasers of a full-priced, downloaded copy of the game but purchasers of the "Intro Pack" would buy this extra content separately. According to Seifert, the move was designed to allow the team time to develop the game's levels and to "create a living game that will expand and evolve over time and establish a foundation for the future—this is the first game in a storyline which will continue and expand with future Hitman games".

The episodic release enabled IO Interactive to receive feedback for earlier levels and fix some of the design flaws during the production of later episodes. The positive reaction to Sapienza boosted the team's confidence and encouraged them to continue experimenting with level design by modifying the design principles in later maps, which add new challenges and change players' expectations. The team also believed by periodically releasing episodes, players would be encouraged to replay and master each level, and share their experience with other players while awaiting the next episode.

=== Episodes ===
In addition to the ICA Facility level, which serves as the prologue and a tutorial to the game, Hitman features six locations, including Paris, France; the fictional town of Sapienza, Italy; Marrakesh, Morocco; Bangkok, Thailand; Colorado, United States; and Hokkaido, Japan.

No.	Title	Release date
0	"ICA Facility"	11 March 2016
1	"The Showstopper"	11 March 2016
2	"World of Tomorrow"	26 April 2016
3	"A Gilded Cage"	31 May 2016
4	"Club 27"	16 August 2016
5	"Freedom Fighters"	27 September 2016
6	"Situs Inversus"	31 October 2016

After the release of Marrakesh, IO Interactive announced a "Summer Bonus Episode" that was released on 19 July 2016 and features a remake of the Sapienza and Marrakesh levels, new targets, challenges and opportunities. Additionally, there are several additional "bonus" episodes for 47 to complete.

- "The Icon": 47 is given a contract to assassinate actor-director Dino Bosco on the set of his new superhero movie to save L'Avventura Pictures from being driven into bankruptcy by Bosco's incompetence and the film's over-inflated budget.
- "A House Built on Sand": Prior to the events of "A Gilded Cage", 47 is hired to assassinate Matthieu Mendola, chief architect of international contractor Hamilton-Lowe, and Kong Tuo-Kwang, CEO of rival firm China Corp., who had hired Mendola to steal valuable trade secrets. 47 kills both men and recovers the stolen goods for the client.
- "Holiday Hoarders": 47 takes on an assignment to eliminate professional thieves Harry Bagnato and Marv Gonif, both on the run from American authorities, as they attempt to rob the Palais De Walewska during a Christmas celebration. The targets are a nod to Joe Pesci's and Daniel Stern's characters from the holiday film Home Alone.
- "Landslide": Prior to the events of "World of Tomorrow", 47 is hired by Silvio Caruso to assassinate Marco Abiatti, a wealthy businessman and right-wing politician with mafia ties who is running for mayor of Sapienza with the intention of demolishing most of the town so he can build expensive luxury resorts on the land.

== Reception ==
=== Critical reception ===
Aggregate review scores
Game	Metacritic
The Complete First Season	(PC) 83/100 (PS4) 84/100 (XONE) 85/100
Intro Pack	(PC) 75/100 (PS4) 77/100 (XONE) 75/100
Sapienza	(PC) 84/100 (PS4) 84/100 (XONE) 79/100
Marrakesh	(PC) 79/100 (PS4) 75/100
Bangkok	(PC) 78/100 (PS4) 71/100
Colorado	(PC) 74/100 (PS4) 70/100
Hokkaido	(PC) 83/100 (PS4) 81/100

Hitman received generally positive reviews according to review aggregator Metacritic. Many reviewers regarded the game as a "return to form" for the series after the controversial release of Absolution in 2012.

Many reviewers expressed skepticism at the game's release schedule. When the Paris episode was launched, Arthur Gies of Polygon said the game was more unfinished than episodic. Phil Savage from PC Gamer said, "Hitman feels unrefined and unfinished in lots of small but important ways". As more episodes were released, critics' impressions of the release format improved significantly. Mike Williams from USgamer said the episodic release format helped increase the replayability of Hitman because it gave sufficient time for the players to fully explore a level and experiment with different approaches before a new episode was released. Reviewers from Rock, Paper, Shotgun said the episodic release model meant the game would not be overwhelming for players, that it "[set] an excellent precedent for having impeccable chunks once a month", and that other games should be inspired by this release structure. According to the developers, the format would encourage players to regularly return to and replay each level.

The locations received praise from critics. Williams liked the vast and lively levels, which he described as "playgrounds" players can freely explore and observe. Savage also said the levels are "intricate" and "dense", meaning players would have plenty to do in each level, encouraging them to replay the game. He also liked the variety of the levels presented, especially later levels, which he said add new challenges to the game. GameSpot's Brett Todd also admired the complex design of each level and commented, "the levels are so big and so packed with details that they take on lives of their own, much like separate movies in a franchise". Writing for Game Informer, Jeff Marchiafava said the levels are too big and that players could not stumble upon meaningful opportunities in an organic and spontaneous manner. He also said a lot of trial and error was needed for later episodes because the rules had changed, resulting in a lot of frustration. Eurogamer's Edwin Evans-Thirlwell was disappointed the AI did not react sufficiently to the players' actions.

Critics generally agreed Paris was a promising start to the series, though Sapienza was often named as the game's high point due to the map's complex layout, location variety, and creative assassinations. Marrakesh and Hokkaido were released to a generally positive reception but Bangkok and Colorado were considered to be weaker levels because the assassinations are less creative and the art style is less striking. The Colorado level was often considered to be controversial among players due to its complete lack of public spaces and verticality. Critics liked the idea of a global-trotting adventure; Williams and Todd drew similarities between Hitman and the James Bond films. Some reviewers expressed disappointment that the game reuses voice actors in different locations.

The gameplay received critical praise. Williams said players are able to experiment with different ways to assassinate their targets. As the player progresses, they unlock new tools, which allow them to discover new assassination opportunities, further boosting the game's replay value. Andy Kelly from PC Gamer said, "if you have an absurd idea, the game will almost always accommodate and react to it". Savage said the opportunities are "entertaining" because they often result in very creative assassinations. Todd said the assassinations feel like "more of a funhouse ride than a grim series of contract killings" due to the game's over-the-top nature. Jeffrey Matulef from Eurogamer also commented on AI behaviour, which generates many unscripted moments for players. Some reviewers said the opportunities are too overbearing because the game offers players too much guidance and hand-holding. Reviewers praised IO Interactive for allowing players to play with minimal hints by modifying the game's settings. Many reviewers said the game feels like a puzzle game because of the way the player deciphers AI patterns and approaches their objectives. Savage said the game has the "most elegant implementation" of the disguise system because it introduces a specific type of NPC that will recognise 47's disguise rather than Blood Money's "arbitrary suspicion meter", though several reviewers said the pattern remained difficult to discern. Several critics also disliked the game's always-online requirement and its long load times.

=== Sales ===
Contrary to the developers' expectations, Hitman's episodic format did not succeed commercially. Most of the players purchased the full-priced versions and the sales volume was significantly lower than the traditional boxed release. Due to market confusion over the game's episodic format, even when the game's development was completed, the retail version did not meet publisher Square Enix's expectations, causing it to divest from the studio. Hitman: The Complete First Season was the fourth-best-selling video game at retail in the UK during its week of release, behind Resident Evil 7: Biohazard (2017), Grand Theft Auto V (2013), and FIFA 17 (2016). Despite the slow start, IO Interactive announced the game had attracted seven million players as of November 2017 and more than 13 million players had played the game by May 2018.

=== Accolades ===
Hitman was nominated for Best Action/Adventure Game at The Game Awards 2016 and Evolving Game at the 13th British Academy Games Awards. Video game publication Giant Bomb named Hitman their Game of the Year in 2016; the staff said, "2016 was filled with huge debuts, finales, and resurrections, but the surprise success of Hitman had us talking, sweating, cursing, and laughing more than any other game this year".

Year	Award	Category	Result	Ref.
2016	The Game Awards 2016	Best Action/Adventure Game	Nominated	
2016	NAVGTR Awards	Game, Franchise Action	Nominated	
2017	13th British Academy Games Awards	Evolving Game	Nominated	
2017	New York Game Awards 2017	Statue of Liberty Award for Best World	Won	
2017	Nordic Game Awards 2017	Best Audio	Nominated	
2017	Nordic Game Awards 2017	Best Technology	Won	
2017	Nordic Game Awards 2017	Best Game Design	Nominated	
2017	Nordic Game Awards 2017	Nordic Game of the Year	Nominated	
2017	Spilprisen 2017	Best Sound Design	Nominated	
2017	Spilprisen 2017	Best Visual Design	Nominated	
2017	Spilprisen 2017	Technical Achievement	Won	
2017	Spilprisen 2017	Best Game Design	Won	
2017	Spilprisen 2017	Game of the Year	Nominated	

== Legacy ==
=== World of Assassination trilogy ===
A sequel titled Hitman 2 was released by Warner Bros. Interactive Entertainment in November 2018 for PlayStation 4, Windows, and Xbox One. "Hitman: Legacy Pack" was released on 9 November 2018 as DLC for Hitman 2; all of the missions from the first season of the game were made available in the new game with the improved game mechanics used in Hitman 2. IO Interactive developed and published another sequel, Hitman 3, which was released in January 2021, and concludes the story arc started in Hitman.

A digital-only collection of all the games from the World of Assassination trilogy was released on 20 January 2022. It features Hitman 3 as well as access passes to play the content from Hitman 2 and Hitman inside Hitman 3. A Premium Add-Ons bundle includes all DLC for the games, excluding the "Seven Deadly Sins" DLC from Hitman 3. The Hitman Trilogy bundle can be found on the PS4 and PS5, Xbox Series X/S, Steam and The Epic Games Store. Hitman 3 was rebranded as Hitman: World of Assassination on January 26, 2023, with all content from the previous two games imported to Hitman 3 free of charge. This made the game available on Stadia and the original Hitman was delisted from sales.

=== Other media ===
IO Interactive partnered with Dynamite Entertainment to create Agent 47: Birth of the Hitman, a six-issue comic book miniseries that ran from November 2017 to June 2018, and was later released as a graphic novel in 2019. The series ties-in with the World of Assassination trilogy and depicts 47's life before the events of the games, including his upbringing at Dr. Ort-Meyer's asylum and his previous career as a brainwashed assassin for Providence alongside his best friend, Lucas Grey / Subject 6. IO Interactive had complete control over the storyline of the comic.

In November 2017, Hulu and Fox 21 Television Studios announced they would produce a television series based on the game. Derek Kolstad, Adrian Askarieh and Chuck Gordon would also serve as its executive producers.The pilot episode would be written by Kolstad. Kolstad has stated that his adaption of Agent 47 will differ slightly from that of the vision IO has already made. Despite being announced in 2017, he doesn't know when the TV series will start filming.
