= Hittman =

Hittman may refer to:

- Hittman (band), an American musical group
- Eliza Hittman, an American screenwriter and director
- Hittman, a rapper appearing on Dr. Dre's 1999 album 2001

== See also ==
- Hitman (disambiguation)
