= The Cleansing =

The Cleansing may refer to:

- The Cleansing (Suicide Silence album)
- The Cleansing (John Zorn & Bill Laswell album)
- The Cleansing (novel), horror novel by John D. Harvey
- The Cleansing (song), by In Case of Fire

== See also ==
- Cleansing (disambiguation)
- Ethnic cleansing
