= Mr. Clean (disambiguation) =

Mr. Clean is a brand of household cleaner.

Mr. Clean may also refer to:

== Music ==
- "Mr. Clean" (song), by Yung Gravy
- "Mr. Clean", a song on the 1970 album Straight Life by Freddie Hubbard
- "Mr. Clean", a song on the 1978 album All Mod Cons by The Jam
- "Mr. Clean", a song on the 1994 album Same Old Tunes by Millencolin
- "Mr. Clean", a song on the 2001 album Lou's Blues by Lou Marini and the Magic City Jazz Orchestra
- "Mr. Clean", a song on the 2007 album Dedicated 2 the Oldies 2 by Mr. Capone-E

== Other uses ==
- Tyrone "Mr. Clean" Miller, a character played by Laurence Fishburne in the 1979 film Apocalypse Now
- "Mr. Clean", a 1994 episode of Rugrats

== See also ==
- Carlos Sastre (born 1975), Spanish former road bicycle racer nicknamed "Don Limpio" (Mr. Clean in Spanish) for his reputation for not doping
- Cleaner (disambiguation)
- Clean (disambiguation)
