= Hitman (1997 film) =

- Directed by: R. Dani
- Written by: R. Dani
- Produced by: Jonathan Karlsen
- Starring: Phil Novak; Daniel O'Meara; Wendy Thomas
- Cinematography: Chris Merry
- Edited by: Michael Harrowes
- Music by: François Evans
- Distributed by: Sub Rosa Studios
- Release date: 1997
- Running time: 115 minutes
- Country: United Kingdom
- Language: English

Hitman is a 1997 action film directed by R. Dani as Roberto Roarke, starring Danny O'Meara, Todd Edwards, and Phil Novak.

== Plot ==
Lucky Delon is a prizefighter who is approached by a gangster, BMF, to throw his next fight. Refusing to be intimidated, Lucky knocks his opponent out and skips town. There is no escape for Lucky, when the gangster's henchman catches up with him. Unless he makes amends by doing a hit, he is dead. Faced with no choice, Lucky goes to a bar, where he meets Harvey "The Hitman" Roach, a professional killer who instructs Lucky in the art of being a hitman. But just as Lucky is getting used to having a hitman for a mentor, the BMF springs a new trap that results in a violent and bloody showdown.
