= Cleaner (disambiguation) =

A cleaner is an industrial or domestic worker who cleans.

Cleaner(s) or The Cleaner(s) may also refer to:

== Cleaning ==
- Cleaning agent, a substance used to remove dirt, stains, etc.
- Cleanser, a product used to cleanse, such as a facial cleanser
- Dry cleaning, a textile cleaning process

== People ==
- Janitor, custodian, caretaker, cleaning lady
- Laundress, laundryman
- Cleaner (crime), a person who cleans up evidence of a crime
- "The Cleaner", a nickname of Canadian wrestler Kenny Omega

== Arts, entertainment, and media ==
=== Fictional characters ===
- Victor, The Cleaner from La Femme Nikita, also featured in the remake Point of No Return (1993)
- Cleaners, a fictional group of contract killers in the video game Max Payne 2: The Fall of Max Payne
- The Cleaner, an Afghan character in Hyena Road (2015)
- Winston Wolf, also known as The Cleaner, in the film Pulp Fiction (1994)
- Léon Montana refers to himself as a cleaner as a euphemism for hitman in Léon: The Professional (1994)
- Geri, a fictional character who appears as the cleaner in Toy Story 2, but originates from Geri's Game

=== Film ===
- Cleaner (2007 film), an American thriller starring Samuel L. Jackson
- Code Name: The Cleaner, a 2007 American action thriller film starring Cedric the Entertainer
- Cleaner (2025 film), a British action-thriller film directed by Martin Campbell
- The Cleaner (2012 film), a Peruvian film
- The Cleaners (2018 film), a documentary film about social media moderation, that won 7 documentary film awards at film festivals
- Cleaners (2019 film), a Philippine film
- The Cleaner (2021 film), with Lynda Carter

=== Television ===
- Cleaners (TV series), a 2013 made-for-Crackle series starring Emily Osment
- The Cleaner (Primeval), a fictional character in the TV series Primeval
- The Cleaner (The X-Files), a fictional character in the TV series The X-Files
- The Cleaner (American TV series), a 2008 series starring Benjamin Bratt
- The Cleaner (British TV series), a 2021 BBC comedy series starring Greg Davies
- Dark City: The Cleaner, a 2024 New Zealand crime drama show

=== Other ===
- Cleaner (band), a German electronic music group
- The Cleaner (novel), a 2006 novel by Paul Cleave

== Other uses ==
- CCleaner, a utility used to clean potentially unwanted files and invalid Windows Registry entries from a computer
- Cleaner, a video-editing software package created by Media 100 and later sold to Autodesk
- Cleaner fish, fish that remove dead skin and parasites from other fish
- the Cleaners (serial killers), a Russian Neo-Nazi and serial killer group

== See also ==
- Mr. Clean (disambiguation)
- Fixer (disambiguation)
- Hitman (disambiguation)
