= Cleansing =

Cleansing may refer to:

- Ethnic cleansing, the systematic forced removal of ethnic or religious groups from a given territory by a more powerful ethnic group
- Cleanliness, the abstract state of being clean and free from dirt, and the process of achieving and maintaining that state
- Data cleansing, in data management, the detection and correction of corrupt or inaccurate records
- Social cleansing, the elimination of "undesirable" social elements
- Detoxification (alternative medicine) or body cleansing, is a disputed alternative medical practice
  - Colon cleansing, an alternative medicine involving the use of enemas and diets, often as part of detoxification
- Cleansing (album), an album by Prong
- "The Cleansing", a song by Overkill from the album The Killing Kind
- Zachistka ("cleansing operation"), Russian term for house-to-house operations to cleanse a territory from enemy military forces

== See also ==
- Cleaning (disambiguation)
- Cleanliness
- The Cleansing (disambiguation)
- Ritual purification
