= Hitman 3 =

- Cover art featuring Agent 47. The black cover reflects this installment's "darker", "more serious" tone.
- Developer: IO Interactive (Note: VR: Reloaded was developed and published by XR Games.)
- Publisher: IO Interactive
- Director: Mattias Engström
- Producers: Markus Friedl; Céline Gil; Jesper Nielsen; Karim Boussoufa
- Programmers: Jacob Marner; Maurizio de Pascale
- Artist: Alexander Andersen
- Writers: Nick Price; Michael Vogt
- Composer: Niels Bye Nielsen
- Series: Hitman
- Platforms: Nintendo Switch; PlayStation 4; PlayStation 5; Stadia; Windows; Xbox One; Xbox Series X/S; Meta Quest 3 (VR: Reloaded); PlayStation VR2; Nintendo Switch 2; iOS; iPadOS; macOS
- Release: 20 January 2021: Switch, PS4, PS5, Stadia, Windows, Xbox One, Xbox Series X/S; 20 January 2021; Meta Quest 3 (VR: Reloaded); 5 September 2024; PlayStation VR2; 27 March 2025; Switch 2; 5 June 2025; iOS, iPadOS; 27 August 2025; macOS; 25 February 2026
- Genre: Stealth
- Modes: Single-player, multiplayer

Hitman 3 (Note: Stylized as Hitman III; retitled Hitman: World of Assassination in 2023) is a 2021 stealth game developed and published by IO Interactive. It is the eighth main installment in the Hitman video game series, the sequel to 2018's Hitman 2, and the third game in the World of Assassination trilogy. Concluding the story arc started in 2016's Hitman, the game follows genetically engineered assassin Agent 47 and his allies as they hunt down the leaders of the secretive organization Providence, which controls global affairs and was partially responsible for 47's creation and upbringing. Like its two predecessors, the game is structured around six levels, five of which are large sandbox locations that players can freely explore to find opportunities to eliminate their targets.

The base game features six locations: Dubai, Dartmoor, Berlin, Chongqing, Mendoza, and the Carpathian Mountains in Romania. A post-launch update introduced a new fictional island location set in the Andaman Sea. IO Interactive wanted the game to be more story-driven. As a result, Hitman 3 has a more mature and serious tone. The team was more willing to experiment with its mission design, shaking up the existing gameplay loop and realizing ideas that they had been unable or afraid to implement in the past, such as framing assassination opportunities within a murder-mystery in the Dartmoor level. While gameplay is largely similar to its predecessor, developers were inspired by immersive sim games, adding many elements from the genre such as an emphasis on engaging with the world for intel, branching level stories with multiple possible outcomes, and prevalent opportunities to make use of the environment's emergent gameplay.

Hitman 3, the first game to be self-published by IO Interactive after becoming an independent studio, was first released worldwide for PlayStation 4, PlayStation 5, Windows, Xbox One, Xbox Series X/S, Stadia, and Nintendo Switch (via cloud gaming) in January 2021. It received positive reviews, with praise for its level design and atmosphere, stealth mechanics, and 47's abilities. Some critics called it the best entry in the series; the game has been called one of the greatest stealth games of all time. Hitman 3 was the series' most commercially successful title, and has been extensively supported by IO with several releases of downloadable content and free updates. In January 2023, IO rebranded Hitman 3 as Hitman: World of Assassination, shifting the game into a live-service format with the contents of the previous two Hitman games becoming available to Hitman 3 owners for free. Hitman 3 VR: Reloaded, a standalone edition of the game's VR mode featuring only the main Hitman 3 campaign, was released for Meta Quest 3 by XR Games in September 2024.

== Gameplay ==
The player explores the Burj al-Ghazali / the Sceptre in Dubai, a fictional skyscraper inspired by the Burj Khalifa, in the game's first mission "On Top of the World".

Like its predecessors, Hitman 3 is a stealth game played from a third-person perspective, in which players once again assume control of assassin Agent 47. 47 travels to various locations and carries out contracted assassinations, continuing the story of the last two games. The base game features six new locations: Dubai, Dartmoor, Berlin, Chongqing, Mendoza, and the Carpathian Mountains in Romania. A seventh map, a fictional island in the Andaman Sea called Ambrose Island, was added for free on 26 July 2022. Owners of Hitman or Hitman 2 are able to import maps, levels, and their progress into Hitman 3. Maps from the older games incorporate the new gameplay changes featured in Hitman 3. PC and PlayStation players can play the game in first-person with a virtual reality headset.

As with previous games in the series, each location (with the exception of the Romania mission), is a large, complex sandbox environment that the player can freely explore for infiltration and assassination opportunities. Players will gradually discover "persistent shortcuts", creating pathways that can be used in future playthroughs. With the exception of the Berlin level, players are assigned several assassination targets, which can be highlighted using 47's instinct vision. Instinct vision highlights all relevant items of interest. Using stealth tactics are key to 47's success. 47 can gain access to restricted areas of the game by obtaining a disguise either by incapacitating non-player characters (NPCs) or by finding it somewhere in the map. Eavesdropping on conversations between NPCs can open up new ways for assassinations. Players may encounter several "mission stories" in each level, which serve as a set of guided instructions that reveal opportunities for unconventional assassinations. To avoid detection, players should avoid performing actions that would be deemed as suspicious, such as crouching or running in the open. The player's disguise may affect what actions a player may perform. For instance, dressing as a guard allows 47 to wander around the map with guns and weapons without drawing attention from other characters. Some NPCs, called enforcers, can see through the player's disguise. Guards have several states of alert level. Some may be suspicious of 47, who must attempt to blend in and mingle with the crowd to avoid drawing further attention. If the player is spotted performing an illegal action, 47 may be compromised and guards will begin searching for him. To avoid this, he must incapacitate the witnesses or change his current outfit.

Each mission starts with a planning phase, allowing 47 to choose what weapons and items to bring with him. After the player completes a level once, they can choose their starting location in the map during this phase. Players can use a variety of methods to approach their target. 47 has a wide range of firearms and explosives that he can use to eliminate his targets. Items in the world can be picked up by 47 and used as makeshift weapons. He can use various items and gadgets to distract enemies, or assassinate targets. For instance, the ICA briefcase allows 47 to smuggle illegal weapons into an area, while the lockpick allows him to infiltrate locked areas. One addition in Hitman 3 is a camera, which can be used to scan items and relay information to 47's handler. As players complete various challenges and replay a level, approaching their targets in different ways, they earn experience points and unlock Mastery Levels, which come with unlocks of gear. Players are penalized for killing non-targets, or having crimes noticed by other NPCs or security cameras. Players are encouraged to stage their assassinations as accidental kills, which can significantly improve the mission ranking.

=== Gameplay modes ===
In addition to the game's single-player campaign, numerous game modes from previous games return in Hitman 3. Escalation contracts are multi-stage contracts that get harder with each stage. They task players with eliminating targets under specific conditions, such as wearing a particular disguise or using a specific weapon. Hitman 3 features "Elusive Targets", which are time-limited missions that may only be attempted once. Elusive Targets are introduced in the game as regular updates. Hitman 3 introduces "Elusive Target Arcade", which is a permanent feature in the game. In Elusive Target Arcade, players must take down several Elusive Targets consecutively as the difficulty increases from target to target. Failing requires the player to wait 30 minutes before attempting again. The game features Contracts Mode, where a player can select several targets across all maps in the World of Assassination trilogy, add extra complications like specific kill methods, and share their contracts with other players.

The roguelike mode "Freelancer" was introduced in 2023. In this mode, 47 must take down several crime syndicates as a freelancer, without the help of the Agency, and players cannot save the game during missions. Players must eliminate four Syndicate leaders to complete the mode, after first eliminating the lower members of each syndicate in separate contract missions before the leaders are lured out. The player's contract, the assassination conditions, and the player's starting location are randomly generated. When a leader is lured out, a "Showdown" mission becomes available, and 47's handler Diana informs the player of four physical and three behavioral characteristics of the leader. Players can use their "suspect camera" to identify the syndicate leader in a level. Each syndicate has a unique "syndicate type" which rewards a particular playstyle. Completing missions earns the player Merces, which can be used to purchase weapons and gear. In each map, players can earn extra Merces by eliminating Couriers and opening safes. They can find Suppliers who sell unique Freelancer weapons. Some weapons collected in a map may be brought back to the safehouse for use in future missions. As Mastery Levels increase, 47's safehouse, which serves as a hub space for the mode, gradually expands. If the player fails a mission, 47 loses all of the equipment that he brought with him and half of his Merces reserve. Future locations become more guarded, as the syndicate members become aware of 47's presence. If the player dies or fails a Showdown mission, the player's progress is reset.

A two-player cooperative multiplayer mode named "Stone & Knight" was announced in June 2025.

== Plot ==
During the events of Hitman 2, Agent 47 and his handler, Diana Burnwood, defect from the International Contract Agency (ICA) and join forces with rogue mercenary Lucas Grey to track down Providence, a secretive alliance of corporate executives, politicians, and industrialists collectively wielding political, military, and economic influence. In the game's final mission, the trio kidnap Arthur Edwards, Providence's intermediary known as the Constant, who identifies the three Partners controlling Providence: Carl Ingram, Marcus Stuyvesant, and Alexa Carlisle. Edwards, however, later escapes captivity and seized the Partners' corporate assets for himself. In Hitman 3, 47 and Grey seek revenge on Providence for turning them both into assassins through childhood conditioning and genetic experimentation, while Diana is motivated by the death of her parents—unaware that 47 carried out the killings while under Providence's control.

Working together, 47 and Grey eliminate Ingram and Stuyvesant in Dubai during the inauguration of the Sceptre (modeled after the Burj Khalifa), the world's tallest skyscraper, and Carlisle at her ancestral manor in Dartmoor. Following the Partners' deaths, Edwards assumes control of Providence and deploys mercenaries to capture Grey. Disguised as a mercenary, 47 attempts to rescue Grey, but the latter commits suicide to prevent the former's cover from being blown.

47 arranges to meet hacker Olivia Hall, Grey's only other trusted ally, in Berlin. Discovering that the ICA is tailing them, 47 kills several ICA agents sent to eliminate him, before he and Hall decide to conclusively stop the ICA by exposing its crimes to the public. 47 eliminates Hush and Imogen Royce, the overseers of the ICA's data storage facility in Chongqing, allowing Hall to steal and publish all of the ICA's operational data, while deleting all records referencing 47 and Diana. The ICA is irrevocably compromised and dismantled, ending 47's career as a professional assassin.

Meanwhile, Edwards attempts to convert Diana to succeed him as Constant and seeks her betrayal of 47 by revealing that he killed her parents. Diana seemingly double-deals both sides, accepting Edwards's offer while inviting 47 to a gathering of Providence members in Mendoza, where he is instructed to eliminate the only people opposed to Diana's succession—Tamara Vidal and Don Archibald Yates—so that she can dismantle the organization upon assuming control. After he follows her instructions, 47's longtime trust in Diana is shaken when she incapacitates him with poison, seemingly as revenge for the murder of her parents.

In a dream, a vision of Grey persuades 47 that Diana has not betrayed him, but rather helped to put Edwards within his reach. 47 wakes up imprisoned on a Providence-controlled train travelling in Romania through the Carpathian Mountains. 47 learns that Edwards is on board the train. When 47 confronts Edwards, he reveals that he had intended to once more turn 47 into a Providence assassin by wiping his memory through an injection of serum. Edwards leaves 47 with a choice: kill Edwards or inject himself with the serum, though 47 has the opportunity to inject Edwards with the serum instead. With Edwards either dead or amnesiac by the end of the mission, 47 flees into the wild. Meanwhile, Diana assumes power as Constant and enacts a purge of Providence's members from leadership positions at major global corporations, dismantling the alliance's power structure. A year later, 47 reconnects with Diana and the pair return to their former roles as assassin and handler, respectively, to keep the global elites in check, albeit now working freelance.

In an alternate ending, if 47 injects himself with the serum while confronting Edwards, he passes out and later awakens in a padded room, greeted by Edwards's voice saying: "Wake up. Wake up, my friend. It's the dawn of a new day, and you have things to do", echoing the opening of Hitman: Codename 47.

== Development ==
=== Gameplay design ===
The idea for each location in the game began with the team deciding on some keywords and phrases that would define the level's themes. Each area in the game was designed to be a lived-in space, big enough for players to explore and express their creativity. As with previous entries in the series, the team worked with contrasts. For instance, beneath the dark, rain-soaked streets of Chongqing lies a bright, hyper-modern research facility. Missions contrast each other. For instance, the Dubai level, which is set during the inauguration of the Scepter, the world's tallest skyscraper, is immediately followed by Dartmoor, which features a historic mansion. Game director Mattias Engström said that, whereas the Mumbai and Miami missions in Hitman 2 reached the limits of mission sizes, potentially overwhelming players, the team designed Hitman 3 with the understanding that "it's better to be a little sharper and more focused, to create a more polished and coherent experience". The levels in Hitman 3 are more experimental in nature, with the developer changing up the gameplay formula in certain missions (e.g., the Berlin level), and implementing older ideas that they had not been able to implement (e.g., the murder-mystery in the Dartmoor level).

Developers were inspired by immersive sim games in designing several features, such as keypads and other items that create puzzles for the player to solve. The introduction of persistent shortcuts that can only be opened from one direction, but will stay open permanently in all future playthroughs, was designed to "encourage exploration, reward curiosity, and incentivize replayability". Predictability and consistency were key factors for the AI, with developers wanting the game to be fun and interesting to experiment with even if it meant the AI seemed to be "stupid" sometimes. Scripting for the game's artificial intelligence, however, required immense effort from the team. The team had frequent meetings to discuss changing target's behaviour, and spent a significant amount of time ensuring that the system and the simulation would not break, even if the player performs unconventional actions.

=== Level design ===
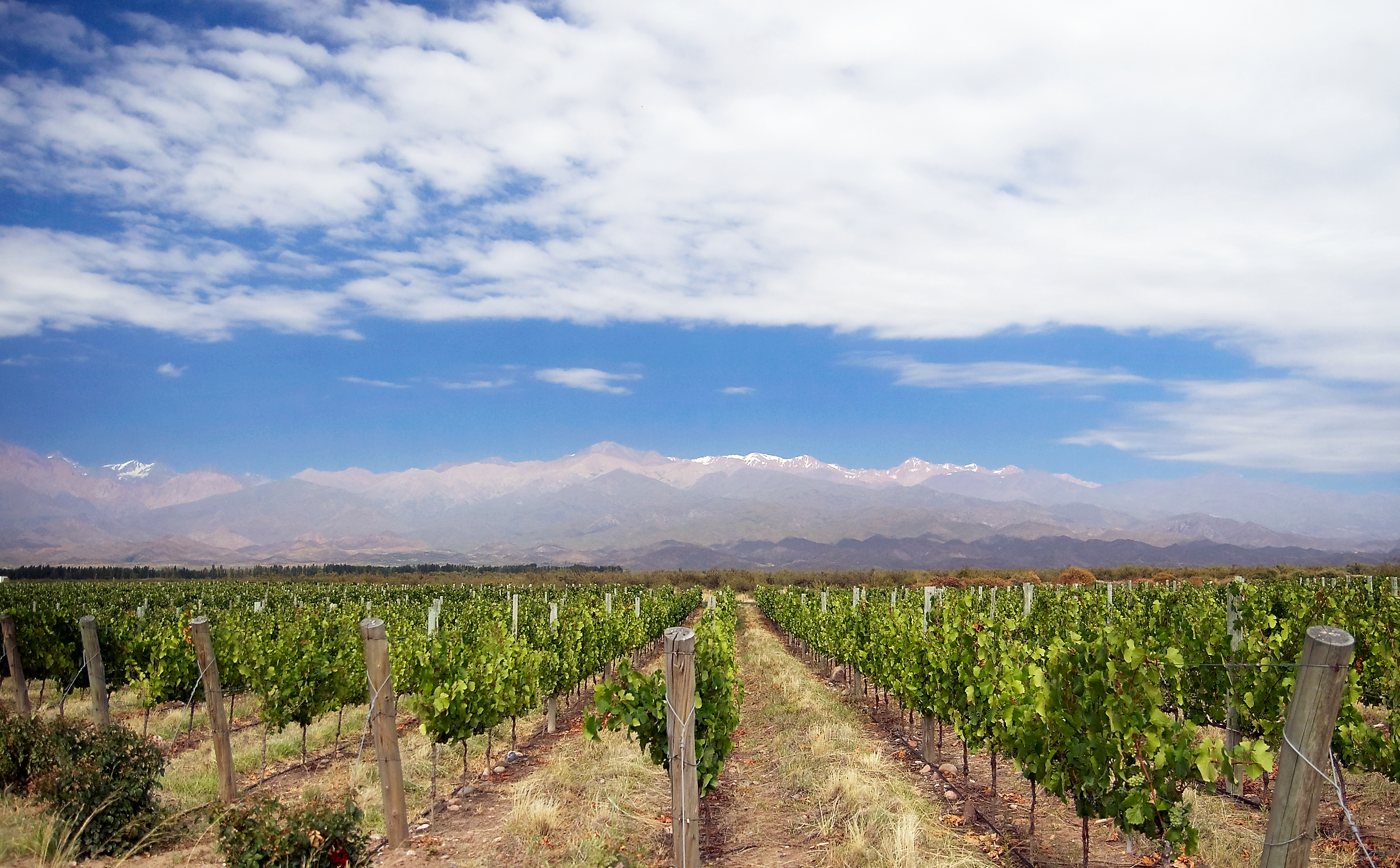
One of the missions in the game takes place in a vineyard in Mendoza, Argentina.

For the opening mission in Dubai, Engström gave the level designers and artists several phrases, such as "an inviting beginning", "open and airy", and "on top of the world" (which is the name for the mission in the game). During development the team felt that the level was not living up to the "vertigo" and "verticality" keywords, and that the level would not give the player the feeling that they were high up on a massive skyscraper. As a result, the beginning of the mission was changed so that the player started outside of the skyscraper and working their way in, rather than starting by exiting an elevator into an atrium. IO Interactive's art director and lead environment artist visited Dubai early in development to gather reference material.

Dartmoor was based around phrases like "a house filled with secrets", "ominous", and "vulnerable". The mansion setting was decided quite early on in development and features a gothic design inspired by detective fiction, such as Agatha Christie novels. The linear structure of a murder-mystery caused IO to rework some of the mechanics and narrative paths, as they clashed with the design principles of replayibility and player freedom. The team experimented with using randomized culprits, but struggled to build a narrative. Despite the singular, fixed story, players are required to replay the level several times to get the full picture of the incident. The player can gather evidence to accuse different characters, resulting in different outcomes. The story requires a detective disguise to allow free access to most of the level, in contrast to most Hitman levels, where the player has to avoid being detected. The first version of the mission allowed the player full freedom to explore rooms and talk to people, but the player would not know who exactly they could talk to or which rooms were relevant. The team highlighted all of the people and objects of interest, resulting in a dull experience for playtesters, who would merely follow each icon and interact with all prompts. The final version of the mission uses more subtle ways to guide players, such as through conversations between staff members and guards. Sound cues, such as a draft of wind through a room or the sound of ruffling paper, were used to hint the player in the right direction towards clues. The addition of a secondary target, where the player would be asked to eliminate the true culprit, was considered but ultimately cut.

The Berlin mission was based on the key words "loneliness" and "isolation". The forest featured in the opening was deliberately designed to be cold and isolating to contrast with the rave found in the main part of the level. IO sought to make the rave and music in the Berlin nightclub authentic. The main level designer for the mission lives in Berlin and did location scouting for the level, taking reference photos and recording sounds. Instead of using tracks from other sources, Hitman 3 composer Niels Bye Nielsen wrote the music that is played at the rave. The crowd NPCs are programmed to adjust their dance moves in response to the music as it builds. Berlin features none of the guided mission stories found in other Hitman levels, and the player must identify the targets by themselves. While the team initially included a primary target, Agent Montgomery, and the other agents as optional targets, it later decided to leave the choice of targets up to the player. Initially, all 10 agents would show up in the game's instinct mode, but the team found that to be overwhelming for a first playthrough. Berlin is the first level in the trilogy to feature armed targets who will fight back instead of running into lockdown. Earlier versions of the level included agents patrolling as pairs and targets immediately pulling out their weapon to shoot Agent 47 upon spotting him; the team deemed that design too punishing. Berlin was the most expensive level to make as a result of the development of features, such as target identification and different methods of presenting information to the player.

The Mendoza location was IO Interactive's first attempt to depict Argentina in the Hitman franchise. The original two ideas for the level were a "tango location set in Buenos Aires" or a vineyard in South Africa. Both ideas were combined and Mendoza was chosen because it is an internationally known wine producing region. The company went to great lengths to create a fictional location with authentic-looking terrain and vegetation, to show the winemaking process, and to accurately portray aspects of Argentine culture, such as tango and the drinking of mate. As IO Interactive's associate producer Pablo Prada is from Argentina, he provided insight for many aspects of the level. The real-life Villavicencio Natural Reserve was an inspiration for the architecture of the level. Professional dancers were hired for the tango animations and consulted about the music. The designers reused existing NPC Spanish-dialect dialogue, which had been recorded with Colombian and Mexican accents, rather than recording new NPC dialogue with Argentine accents, due to time and budgetary constraints, as well as the COVID-19 pandemic. The company instead chose to focus on securing appropriate voice talent for the Chongqing location.

Ambrose Island was added as a free downloadable content (DLC) update in 2022. The level is set during the events of Hitman 2. Live game director Kevin Goyon said that the team wanted to create a "pirate fantasy" and "to make a location that felt dangerous – but where 47 would belong". IO wanted to explore what happened to Lucas Grey's militia after he left it during Hitman 2. The team explored the idea of rival factions, with the militia and pirates on the island on the brink of a conflict. Goyon said that this allowed them "to create a rich lore and interesting situations". The island location provided a natural way to define the boundaries of the map. In contrast to other outdoor Hitman maps, which revolve around built-up areas (e.g., Hitman 2's Santa Fortuna and Mumbai), Ambrose Island was designed around the natural rocky topology and jungles of the island, with much of the map consisting of natural environments. The topology and jungles divide the map into different zones, allowing the team to experiment with more verticality than usual on the map.

=== Story ===
In Hitman 3, the developers emphasized the game's story aspects and sought to create closure for 47's character. The game incorporates hand-crafted moments designed around the first time playthrough, with the aim being to integrate many core story moments into the gameplay. Hitman 2 established the major players, and Hitman 3 allows each of these characters to develop their own character arc and become more involved in both the story and the gameplay. Throughout all three games, Agent 47 is undergoing a period of self-discovery: learning about his past, rebuilding his relationships with other characters, and realizing his ability to exercise his free will. The Berlin level, in which 47 refuses one of his allies' advice to leave the compound and instead opts to eliminate the ICA agents sent to hunt him, was considered to be an important "character moment" for him, as it represents the first instance in which he must make a choice. The Mendoza level is the first time the player meets Diana face-to-face in the trilogy. At the end of the mission, 47 dances with Diana for a tango. IO chose to limit the player's outfit choices for this particular moment in order to maintain the atmosphere and not undermine the storytelling. The Carpathian Mountains level, which was controversial for its linear design, was described by Engström as a "narratively driven set-piece that is setting up closure for the trilogy". The train was designed as a metaphor for 47 spending his life "following a path determined by others", with his stepping off the train at the end being symbolic of 47 leaving his past as a contract killer behind at the end of the story. The game had a "more mature, serious, darker" tone when compared with Hitman 2, which features a more lighthearted tone. The team took a more measured approach to the game's humor. While elements of lightheartedness are still core to the game's design, they are more likely to be discovered in subsequent playthroughs and are not as "front and center" as in Hitman 2.

The game had six writers and a producer who managed the writing team. According to Forest Swartout Large, the game's executive producer, the dialogue budget accounted for a significant proportion of the overall development budget because the team had to write dialogue for not only the linear story, but also the emergent gameplay. The game's voice cast includes David Bateson as Agent 47, Jane Perry as Diana Burnwood, John Hopkins as Lucas Grey, Isaura Barbé-Brown as Olivia Hall, and Phillip Rosch as Arthur Edwards. For the incidental dialogue, Bateson was instructed not to diversify his accent to fit the context of the situation. Instead, he was directed to deliver dialogue in a "delightfully wooden" way and deliver each line, regardless of how absurd it may be, seriously. Bateson further stated that he wanted to "give [47] almost a kind of Frankenstein's monster feel to him". Reflecting on the evolution of dark humour across the three games, Bateson said that "[it] has matured and evolved like a good cheese or a good wine, without the writers wanting to belittle or turn it into some kind of a lightweight comedy, because it's not. People are dying horrific deaths. But it's nice to have that dark humour".

=== Technology ===
IO Interactive reduced the file size of Hitman 3—including the data for the first two games in the trilogy—to 60-70 GB, as compared to Hitman 2's 150 GB size. Engine improvements, data deduplication and lossless LZ4 compression were the main contributors to the file size reduction. In November 2020, IO Interactive announced that they had teamed up with Intel to optimise Hitman 3 performance on high-end CPUs with 8+ cores, which allowed the team to include more crowds and destructible environments. They used Variable Rate Shading, a technique for improving rendering performance by dynamically changing the rate of shading in different parts of the frame. Additional graphics features were added to the game on 24 May 2022, enabling ray traced reflections and ray traced shadows from the sun while indoor shadows still use traditional shadow maps. Support for supersampling techniques such as Nvidia's DLSS and AMD's FidelityFX Super Resolution was also added.

Development video of NPC interactions in Hitman VR

The idea to add a virtual reality (VR) mode originated in 2018, when a senior game designer brought his PlayStation VR headset into the office to show it off. People at the office "couldn't stop playing" the game Firewall: Zero Hour, which inspired the developers to make their own VR mode for Hitman 3. The VR team, which was made up of 10 to 12 people, believed that the game's level design suited the new perspective offered by VR, even though they were not designed with it in mind. The cover system was reworked, with players physically crouching to hide out of sight instead of locking into a cover system. They enabled players to have free-form movement with the game's melee weapons, instead of using scripted animations. Many items, which previously would have been quite small on the screen or obscured by UI, were redesigned to include more detail. The team used the holographic sights for aiming in first-person. Despite VR being designed to be an immersive personal experience, the team decided not to tone down any of the violent content of the game. IO Interactive and XR Games announced Hitman 3 VR: Reloaded in June 2024, releasing it exclusively for Meta Quest 3 in September.

== Release ==
The game was announced on 11 June 2020 at the PlayStation 5 reveal event with the tagline 'Death Awaits'. Development concluded after a year and a half with a total budget of $20 million. IO Interactive self-published the game. Hitman 3 was released for Windows, PlayStation 4, PlayStation 5, Xbox One, and Xbox Series X and Series S natively, Nintendo Switch via cloud streaming technology, and cloud gaming service Stadia (under the title Hitman: World of Assassination). A VR mode was released for PlayStation VR on the same day. Full VR and motion control support for PC players became available in January 2022. Players who pre-ordered the game received the "Trinity Pack", which includes a collection of items inspired by the two previous games in the World of Assassination trilogy. A commemorative passport celebrating the 20th anniversary of the franchise is available for players who preordered the physical version of Hitman 3 Deluxe Edition, which was released with Limited Run Games. IO Interactive had considered returning to the episodic model for Hitman 3 like that seen in 2016's Hitman, wherein the first location would have been released in August 2020. The Hitman 3 Free Starter Pack was made available on 30 March 2021, which grants players permanent access to the ICA Facility training missions from 2016's Hitman and periodic free access to other locations from the trilogy. In September 2022, Google announced that Stadia would be shut down in January 2023. In response, IO Interactive announced that Stadia players would be able to transfer their progress to other platforms from 11 January to 17 February 2023.

IO Interactive signed a 12-month exclusivity period for the Windows version with the Epic Games Store, explaining "as an independent studio, our partnership with Epic has given us the freedom to create Hitman 3 exactly as we imagined and self-publish the game to our players directly". Prior to the game's launch, IO Interactive announced that unlike console players, PC players who owned Hitman or Hitman 2 on Steam would not be able to unlock locations from previous games in Hitman 3 unless they repurchased them on the Epic Games Store, backtracking on their promise. This led to criticism over IO's exclusivity deal with the Epic Games Store. Tim Sweeney, Epic Games' CEO, issued an apology and committed to working with IO Interactive on a solution to allow Steam players to import locations to the Epic Games Store. IO guaranteed that players would not need to repurchase the games, however they admitted that there would be a delay and players would not be able to import Hitman 2 locations into Hitman 3 for another few weeks. IO offered 2016's Hitman: Game of the Year Edition to players who pre-ordered or purchased the game within its first ten days of release on PC. The location transfer system was implemented a month later.

On 13 January 2022, IO Interactive announced the Hitman Trilogy, a collection of all three games in the World of Assassination trilogy. Both Hitman 3 and the Hitman Trilogy were released for Steam on 20 January 2022. Upon launch, the Steam version was met with a wave of negative reviews from players who complained about the price being the same as when the game had launched on the Epic Games Store a year earlier. The pricing system was seen as confusing by some due to the large amount of different versions of the game available. In response, IO Interactive issued a statement saying that the "Hitman 3 launch on Steam didn't go as planned" and offered all players who had already bought the game or who purchased it through to 19 February a free upgrade to the Deluxe Edition of the game. Players who already owned or purchased either the Deluxe Edition or the Hitman Trilogy would receive the Seven Deadly Sins DLC for free instead.

IO Interactive supported Hitman 3 extensively with post-launch updates. IO Interactive launched a seven-part downloadable content series named Seven Deadly Sins. The sins are Greed, Pride, Sloth, Lust, Gluttony, Envy and Wrath, with the packs being released in that order. The first pack (Greed) was released on 30 March. The packs can be bought individually or collectively as part of a season pass. Each pack contains a unique escalation, a new suit and a new sin-themed item. The release of each pack started a new 'Season of Sin' lasting between four and six weeks, during which the regular free content such as featured contracts and elusive targets would be themed around the sin for that season. The final pack (Wrath) was released on 26 October 2021, with the "Season of Wrath" concluding on 29 November. While IO initially declared that they were unlikely to make new maps for the locations and instead, focused on "reimagining" existing locations, they released "Ambrose Island", a new location for free in July 2022. The Freelancer mode was originally set to be released in 2022, though its release was pushed to January 2023. Alongside Freelancer's release, IO Interactive announced that Hitman 3 would be rebranded as Hitman: World of Assassination, packaging both Hitman Game of the Year Edition and Hitman 2 Standard Access Pass into Hitman 3. The two older Hitman games were then removed from storefronts. The Deluxe version of the game includes Hitman 2 Expansion Access Pass, which allows players to gain access to the New York Bank DLC level and the Haven Island level, Hitman 3 Deluxe Edition and the Seven Deadly Sins DLC packs.. Starting in August 2023 there have also been regularly released Celebrity Elusive Stargets, these are; Sean Bean (Note: Target was first released in Hitman 2), Dimitri Vegas, Conor McGregor (McGregor was removed in November 2024 as a result of a ruling in a rape case), Jean Claude Van Damme, Mads Mikkelsen (reprising his role as Le Chiffre from Casino Royale), Bruce Lee (Note: Rather than playing a target Lee's character was aa ally of Agent 47), Eminem, Milla Jovovich, Wiz Khalifa, Snoop Dogg, and Jacksepticeye. Hitman: World of Assassination was released for PlayStation VR2 on 27 March 2025, and for the Nintendo Switch 2 on 5 June as a launch title for that console. Ports for iOS and iPadOS were released on 27 August, followed by a macOS port on 25 February 2026.

== Reception ==
=== Critical reception ===
Reception

Aggregate score
| Aggregator | Score |
|---|---|
| Metacritic | NS: 70/100; PC: 87/100; PS4: 84/100; PS5: 84/100; XSX: 87/100; NS2: 78/100; PSVR2: 82/100 |

Review scores
| Publication | Score |
|---|---|
| Eurogamer | Recommended |
| Game Informer | 9/10 |
| GameSpot | 9/10 |
| GamesRadar+ | 4.5/5 |
| GameZone | 8.5/10 |
| IGN | 9/10 |
| VentureBeat | 5/5 |
| VG247 | 5/5 |

Hitman 3 received "generally favorable" reviews, according to review aggregator platform Metacritic. It has been considered by some critics to be the best entry in the series and one of the greatest stealth games of all time. The game was praised for its gameplay loop, creativity, and level design. It was the best-reviewed game in the series.

Nick Statt from The Verge praised Hitman 3 for being a cohesive and accessible experience, stating that "IOI has meticulously crafted ways to teach even the most bumbling, haphazard players how to become Agent 47 in mind and body". He compared the game's levels to puzzles, writing that often invites players to understand its gameplay systems and exploit them in order to find success. He praised the game for allowing players to experiment with different approaches, making Hitman 3 a "memorable and darkly comedic experience". Edwin Evans-Thirlwell from Eurogamer wrote that Hitman 3 was most rewarding when observing the patterns of the game's systems and strategising novel plans, although he was disappointed that it does not react to the player's actions in a significant way after a target has been killed. While Jeff Cork from Game Informer liked the slow pacing and approach to level design, he felt that Hitman 3 was unlikely to convince players unimpressed with previous games. Luke Reily, writing for IGN, wrote that "the slow-burn thrill of these games comes from planning, patience, and hiding in plain sight", and the game "rewards rational thinking over rushing", while accommodating players who enjoy more action-packed games. Russ Frushtick from Polygon wrote that Hitman 3 frequently contrasted "predictable assassin-y stuff with true nonsense", and that the pairing of both seriousness and absurdity resulted in "high comedy".

Some critics compared the Dartmoor level, which features an optional murder-mystery, to the film Knives Out.

The game's level design received critical praise. Writing for The Guardian, Keith Stuart said that IO had successfully created several intricate locations for players to explore. He enjoyed the openness of each level, and wrote that modern Hitman games have become hugely replayable and "a benchmark for generous sandbox game design". Evans-Thirlwell said that Hitman 3's maps were comparable in quality to its predecessors, and said that they were worth revisiting for their diverse assassination opportunities and side stories. Hurley praised the incidental events featured, which helped flesh out the game world. Reily wrote that the maps in Hitman 3 were among the best IO had created, praising each location's complex layout and verticality and the wealth of assassination opportunities within them. Jeff Cork from Game Informer praised the levels for their consistent quality, and noted that despite the fixed gameplay loop, IO Interactive was able to introduce variety to mission design. He wrote that each level offered improvisational opportunities for players to approach their objectives. GameSpot's Phil Hornshaw wrote that Hitman 3 was "full of fun and fascinating ideas". He also said that although the gameplay mechanics were similar to the earlier games in the trilogy, the game "finds new ways to challenge seasoned assassins purely through excellent design". The Berlin level, which twisted the gameplay formula significantly, received critical acclaim. Jeff Grubb from VentureBeat wrote that Berlin demonstrated the "maturity of the Hitman formula", remarking that IO Interactive no longer need to rely on mission stories to guide players, allowing players to enjoy a freeform experience. The Dartmoor map was particularly praised for the optional murder mystery elements, drawing comparisons to the film Knives Out. The final level, set on a train in the Carpathian Mountains, was criticised for its linearity and as feeling out of place for a Hitman game.

The narrative received mixed reviews from critics. Slatt enjoyed the larger emphasis on the game's story. He wrote that the game had successfully combined the engrossing story found in Hitman Absolution and the freeform gameplay found in Hitman: Blood Money. He stated that the stronger story in the game gave players a more clear purpose in assassinating various targets. He also praised IOI for making individual missions more story-driven. Hornshaw praised the game for tying the targets to the game's story, resulting in more interesting characters and consequential missions. Writing for VG 247, Alex Donaldson stated that the experience was more "directed", and that IO's attempt to turn Hitman 3 into an "epic story" largely succeeded, noting that it was significantly less silly than its predecessors. Hurley also felt that the game "has a stronger narrative flow to locations and story beats". Stuart, however, found the story to be forgettable and formulaic, especially in comparison with the emergent stories that the player can create on their own. He likened the game's narrative to "straight-to-Netflix spy thrillers". Cameron Kunzelman from Vice criticised the game for being story-driven. Following the failure of Absolution in 2012, he wrote that the franchise was again repeating its mistake.

The PlayStation VR mode received mostly positive reviews and was praised for its immersion, impressive visuals for a PSVR title and for supporting all of the maps in the trilogy. It was criticised for visual downgrades, including a lack of reflections and low draw distance. The control scheme, which utilises a combination of DualShock 4 controller and motion controls, received mixed reviews. The PC VR version released in 2022 was heavily criticised for not offering full motion controls or improving upon the flaws of the PlayStation version.

=== Sales ===
Hitman 3 reached number one on the UK game boxed charts, with launch sales up by 17% over Hitman 2. IO Interactive stated that Hitman 3 had the "biggest digital launch" for the franchise. A week after the game's release, Hitman 3's sales had surpassed its development budget. By April 2021, IO Interactive CEO Hakan Abrak stated that Hitman 3 had performed "300% better commercially" than Hitman 2. By November 2021, Hitman 3 had become the most successful entry of the World of Assassination trilogy and the series as a whole, reaching 50 million players. By December 2025, the trilogy had collectively sold over 25 million copies.

=== Awards and accolades ===
Hitman 3 received the "PC Game of the Year" award at the Golden Joystick Awards 2021 and the "Best Stealth" award from PC Gamer. Several publications considered it one of the best video games of the year, including Push Square, Electronic Gaming Monthly, Time, Ars Technica, The Guardian, IGN, TechRadar, GamesRadar+, The Washington Post, Edge, Kotaku, GameSpot, Rock Paper Shotgun, Giant Bomb, VG247, NME, Eurogamer, Gamereactor, Mashable, The A.V. Club and Polygon. PC Gamer placed the game 2nd in their 2021 "Top 100 PC Games" list and 5th in their 2022 list.

The game was nominated for "Best VR/AR Game" at The Game Awards 2021 for its PlayStation VR mode. Eurogamer's Ian Higton named it the best PS VR game of 2021 and it was also voted the best PS VR game of 2021 by readers of PlayStation Blog. After its Steam release in 2022, Hitman 3 won "VR Game of the Year" at the 2022 Steam Awards. IO Interactive was nominated for "Best Game Development Studio" at the NME Awards 2022. An episode of the A Sound Effect Podcast featuring Hitman 3 developers titled "How Hitman 3's powerful sound was made with the audio team at IO Interactive" was nominated for "Best Game Audio Presentation Podcast or Broadcast" at the 2022 Game Audio Network Guild Awards.

| Year | Award | Category | Result | Ref. |
|---|---|---|---|---|
| 2021 | Golden Joystick Awards | PC Game of the Year | Won | |
| 2021 | Golden Joystick Awards | Best Visual Design | Nominated | |
| 2021 | Golden Joystick Awards | Ultimate Game of the Year | Nominated | |
| 2021 | The Game Awards 2021 | Best VR/AR Game | Nominated | |
| 2022 | 18th British Academy Games Awards | Technical Achievement | Nominated | |
| 2022 | NME Awards 2022 | Game of the Year | Nominated | |
| 2022 | NAVGTR Awards | Outstanding Control Design, 3D | Nominated | |
| 2022 | NAVGTR Awards | Outstanding Game, Franchise Adventure | Won | |
| 2022 | NAVGTR Awards | Outstanding Sound Mixing in Virtual Reality | Nominated | |
| 2022 | NAVGTR Awards | Outstanding Use of Sound, Franchise | Nominated | |
| 2022 | 22nd Game Developers Choice Awards | Best Technology | Nominated | |
| 2022 | Spilprisen 2022 | Game of the Year | Won | |
| 2022 | Spilprisen 2022 | Best Visuals | Won | |
| 2022 | Spilprisen 2022 | Best Audio | Nominated | |
| 2022 | Spilprisen 2022 | Best Game Design | Won | |
| 2022 | Spilprisen 2022 | Best Narrative | Nominated | |
| 2022 | Nordic Game Awards 2022 | Nordic Game of the Year | Nominated | |
| 2022 | Nordic Game Awards 2022 | Best Game Design | Nominated | |
| 2022 | Nordic Game Awards 2022 | Best Technology | Nominated | |
| 2022 | Nordic Game Awards 2022 | Best Audio | Nominated | |
| 2023 | Steam Awards 2022 | VR Game of the Year | Won | |
| 2026 | 22nd British Academy Games Awards | Evolving Game | Nominated | |

== Future ==
In an interview conducted by Variety in December 2025, IO's CEO Hakan Abrak confirmed that after the studio shares additional information about a new co-op mode for the World of Assassination trilogy, it will begin unveiling information on the next Hitman game.
