= Nordic Game =

Annual video game developers conference in Sweden

- Status: Active
- Genre: Video games
- Venue: Slagthuset
- Location: Malmö
- Country: Sweden
- Inaugurated: 25 November 2004; 21 years ago
- Most recent: 29 November 2023; 2 years ago
- Attendance: 2,500
- Website: nordicgame.com

Nordic Game is a video game developer conference and trade show held annually in Malmö, Sweden. The Nordic Game conference is held each spring, but since 2020, an autumn event is also created each year — held in Helsinki, Finland in November 2022. The main conference in May offers a three-day program with global and Nordic speakers from the games industry, an Expo for showcasing games and related products, as well as networking and business events bringing games industry professionals together — onsite as well as online on the Nordic Game Discord server. It also hosts the Nordic Game Awards, first created in 2006.

In 2013, 1,500 developers, businesspeople, and enthusiasts were expected to participate. The keynote speech that year was given by video game designer Tim Schafer.

In 2016, the Japanese video game designer, screenwriter, director, and producer Hideo Kojima did a Q&A at the conference, and attendance reached 2,500.

The Nordic Game 2017 edition was also held in Malmö, Sweden, while the 2020 edition, on 27–29 May, was held fully online because of the COVID-19 pandemic, from a studio built for the occasion at the Nordic Game offices in Malmö. It gathered 1,350 participants. A second 2020 edition, originally planned to be a regular, full physical event, was to be held on 25–27 November, but eventually was held only with limited physical attendance.
