= Hitman 2 (2018 video game) =

2018 video game

- Cover art featuring Agent 47. The pink cover reflects this installment's more "playful" tone.
- Developer: IO Interactive
- Publisher: Warner Bros. Interactive Entertainment (Note: IO Interactive self-published the Stadia version.)
- Director: Jacob Mikkelsen
- Producers: Forest Swartout Large; Rasmus Nautrup Jensen; Karim Boussoufa; Kalvin Lyle; Jean Biam Tan
- Designer: Philip Andreas Krogh
- Programmer: Maurizio De Pascale
- Artist: Rasmus Poulsen
- Writer: Michael Vogt
- Composer: Niels Bye Nielsen
- Series: Hitman
- Platforms: PlayStation 4; Windows; Xbox One; Stadia
- Release: PS4, Win, XONE; 13 November 2018; Stadia; 1 September 2020
- Genre: Stealth
- Modes: Single-player, multiplayer

Hitman 2 is a 2018 stealth video game developed by IO Interactive. It is the seventh main installment in the Hitman video game series, the sequel to 2016's Hitman and the second game in the World of Assassination trilogy. The game continues the story arc started in Hitman, following genetically engineered assassin Agent 47 as he searches for the mysterious "Shadow Client" who is trying to destroy Providence, a secretive organization that controls global affairs. It also explores more of 47's mysterious background, which Providence offered to bring to light in exchange for 47's assistance. Like its predecessor, the game is structured around six large sandbox locations that players can freely explore to find opportunities to eliminate their targets. It also included two online multiplayer modes called Sniper Assassin and Ghost Mode, though the game's servers for both modes have since been shut down; Sniper Assassin can still be played single-player.

The base game features six different locations: New Zealand, Miami, Colombia, Mumbai, Vermont, and a fictional North Atlantic island called Sgàil. Two post-launch updates introduced locations set in New York City and the Maldives. Sales of 2016's Hitman fell short of expectations, prompting the series' publisher Square Enix to sell IO Interactive, which became an independent studio after a management buyout. With a limited cash flow, the studio laid off nearly half of its employees and had to reduce the scope of the sequel, whose development was about 25% completed. Because the framework had been created with the previous game, development of Hitman 2 was faster than usual, taking about twenty-one months. The previous game's episodic model was abandoned and Hitman 2 was released in full. IO Interactive supported the game with additional content after release, including two paid maps and free elusive targets and contracts.

Hitman 2 was released for PlayStation 4, Windows, and Xbox One by Warner Bros. Interactive Entertainment in November 2018, and for Stadia by IO Interactive in September 2020. It received generally positive reviews, with most critics viewing it as an improvement over its predecessor and praising its varied locations, sandbox design, gameplay enhancements, humour and assassination opportunities. However, the story and the multiplayer modes was met with a mixed response. Hitman 2 recuperated its development costs but its launch during a crowded release window negatively affected sales. Hitman 3, the conclusion of the World of Assassination trilogy, was released in January 2021. In January 2023, Hitman 2 was delisted from sales after IO Interactive rebranded Hitman 3 as Hitman: World of Assassination, (Note: The World of Assassination branding was originally used for the Stadia release of Hitman 2, and later Hitman 3.) with the contents of the previous two Hitman games becoming available to Hitman 3 owners, free of charge.

== Gameplay ==
In this gameplay screenshot, Agent 47 is disguising as a member of the Ark Society in the map of Isle of Sgàil.

Like the first game in the World of Assassination trilogy, Hitman 2 is a stealth game that is played from a third-person perspective. The player assumes control of Agent 47, an assassin whose targets are scattered across the world. The game has eight missions that are set in Hawke's Bay, New Zealand; Miami, Florida; a village in Colombia; the slums of Mumbai, India; a suburb of Vermont called Whittleton Creek; and a fictional North Atlantic island called Sgàil, set within the Northern Isles of Scotland. The game's downloadable content (DLC) includes new locations: a bank in New York City and a resort in the Maldives. Players can download all of the chapters from Hitman if the player owns it or has bought the content as DLC, which incorporates the gameplay changes added to Hitman 2 and allows Hitman to be played within Hitman 2's improved engine. Each of the game's locations is a sandbox-type environment players can explore. Players must understand the layout of the maps to identify infiltration opportunities.

Gameplay structure and design are largely similar to those of Hitman (2016). Players use variety of firearms and gadgets to eliminate their targets, and can use stealth tactics because Agent 47 is fragile in combat. The bodies of dead targets must be hidden to avoid detection. Alternatively, players can explore each location and eavesdrop on conversations to discover "missions stories", which are scripted mission sequences that help Agent 47 identify the location and routine of targets, and uncover unconventional infiltrations or opportunities to kill. Kills can be disguised as accidental deaths. Access to some areas of the game is restricted; players must gain access by obtaining a disguise either by incapacitating non-playable characters (NPCs) or by finding it somewhere in the map. Agent 47 can use "Instinct mode" to identify the targets' locations.

As with the previous games in the series, 47 is expected to blend into the environment by conforming to its social norms and rules. Several quality-of-life adjustments were introduced. Artificial intelligence controlling the NPCs will notice Agent 47 through reflections in mirrors. A picture-in-picture mode informs players of events happening in other parts of the level. The instinct mode shows the field-of-view of security cameras. Agent 47's briefcase can be used to smuggle firearms into a location, and he can use foliage to hide from enemies and blend in with crowds. As players complete missions and challenges, they earn experience points (XP) and mastery levels, unlocking new starting locations and items when they replay the level. Non-lethal takedowns, completion of objectives, accidental and unnoticed kills, and efficiency contribute to the players' score and XP earned. Players' performances would then be uploaded to and shared on a leaderboard.

=== Gameplay modes ===
In addition to the single-player campaign, the game features several gameplay modes. Escalations are missions that include multiple stages. After completing each stage, the player will unlock the next stage which will increase the difficulty by adding additional targets or requirements (such as specific disguises or kill methods). Elusive targets are time-limited assassination missions that can only be attempted once. Contracts mode allows players to assign assassination targets, set requirements for their killings, and share their contracts with other players.

Hitman 2 introduces two new game modes. In Sniper Assassin mode, players are tasked with eliminating targets from afar using a sniper rifle within 15 minutes. As in the main campaign, the NPC will react to the player's actions and each map has numerous assassination opportunities. This mode can be played solo or with other players, who will assume control of either Stone or Knight, characters who are equipped with concussive shockwave rounds and wall-piercing ammunition, respectively. Ghost Mode is a competitive, multiplayer mode in which two players must race against each other to eliminate assassination targets. Players start in the same location with no equipment. The two players cannot directly interact with each other but can see the other player's avatar and will be notified when the other performs certain actions. They also share a target and ghost crates that contain disguises and weapons the players can use. The players who last discovers the crates may be left with inferior gadgets. If a player eliminates the target, the other player will have 20 seconds to eliminate their target in their world. Successful elimination of a target scores one point; the player who receives five points wins the game. Players lose one point if they kill a non-target character.

== Plot ==
Following the events of Hitman, Agent 47 embarks on a mission to find the mysterious "Shadow Client" for Providence, a secretive alliance of corporate executives, politicians, and industrialists collectively wielding political, military, and economic influence on the global scale. 47's employer, the International Contract Agency (ICA), has formed an uneasy alliance with Providence to stop the Shadow Client, whose actions are causing global panic, and 47 has agreed to help in return for Providence revealing his forgotten past. He begins by killing Alma Reynard, one of the Shadow Client's top lieutenants, in her home in New Zealand, and Providence defectors Robert and Sierra Knox (father and daughter) at a racetrack in Miami. Meanwhile, the Providence leaders become angry at the killings of several CEOs and business tycoons associated with the group. Their immediate second-in-command, who first enlisted the ICA's services for Providence directly, formally identifies the Shadow Client as Lucas Grey, a former head of security for Providence who, from his hideout in Central Europe, pursues his own plans with hacktivist Olivia Hall, intending to recruit 47 to help in his quest to destroy Providence.

In Colombia, 47 assassinates Rico Delgado, Jorge Franco, and Andrea Martínez, leaders of a drug cartel who have been using their smuggling network and business connections to aid Grey and his militia. 47's handler Diana Burnwood reports the mission's success to Providence while visiting her family's graves in Surrey, England. Flashbacks reveal she watched as her parents were killed by a car bomb. Grey and his team blow up the headquarters of Ether Biotech Corporation in Johannesburg, steal an unidentified item, and take its CEO hostage in order to publicly reveal Providence's existence. In Mumbai, 47 dismantles the militia's eastern cell by identifying and eliminating Grey's top lieutenant Wazir 'The Maelstrom' Kale and two of his associates, Vanya Shah and Dawood Rangan, who were responsible for the death of another Providence CEO.

47 follows Grey's trail to Romania and finds him at the asylum where he was created by Dr. Ort-Meyer. (Note: As depicted in Hitman: Codename 47 (2000)) Grey reveals that he is also a genetically engineered clone created by Ort-Meyer, formerly known as Subject 6, and reminds 47 of their past friendship and vow to take revenge on those responsible for turning them into assassins. Grey reveals Ort-Meyer was a member of Providence, which he says is controlled by three executive members known as the "Partners" and their second-in-command, known as the "Constant". After Grey's and 47's plan to kill the Partners failed, the former managed to escape, but 47 was captured and had his memories erased. Grey aims to capture the Constant, who is the only person who knows the identities of the Partners. His only lead, however, is 47's knowledge of the identity of the first Constant from a visit to Ort-Meyer decades earlier. Grey reveals the item he stole in Johannesburg is an antidote that may counteract 47's memory loss. Diana is initially reluctant to work with Grey, arguing the ICA does not take sides, but eventually abides by 47's wishes to help Grey.

After taking the antidote, 47 recalls that the first Constant was a KGB spymaster known as Janus. To avoid detection by the ICA and Providence, Diana files a false report implicating Janus as the Shadow Client while claiming Grey is a subordinate, giving 47 a pretext to assassinate Janus, who is living in Vermont after retiring. During the mission to assassinate Janus as well as the head of his security detail, Nolan Cassidy (so as to avoid Cassidy contradicting the report), 47 finds evidence that he was planning to meet the current Constant at a gala held by the "Ark Society", a plutocratic survivalist group founded by Janus during his tenure as Constant. The Partners, believing the report, coerce a resentful Constant into injecting himself with a chip that will release lethal poison into his body if he is compromised. After Hall locates the gala on a remote North Atlantic island, 47 travels there to capture the Constant and kill Zoe and Sophia Washington, the Ark Society's newly appointed chairwomen, who each hold a trigger for the chip. After neutralizing their triggers, the team is able to abduct the Constant.

After the mission, the Constant is taken to a ship to have the poison chip surgically removed and be interrogated about the Partners' identities. He reveals the Partners are representatives of Providence's founding families—the Ingram, Carlisle, and Stuyvesant families—and 47 and Grey leave to find them. The Constant taunts Diana, saying she does not know everything about 47. A final flashback depicts a young 47, under Providence's control, killing Diana's parents.

=== Downloadable content ===
As 47 and Grey begin their search for the Partners, Diana tells them Hall found recent obituaries for all three Partners, leaving the group to conclude the Partners faked their deaths and were planning to assume new identities. The Constant, seemingly unaware of this contingency plan, tells 47 and Grey to follow their bank accounts, which lead them to a New York City bank branch. 47 infiltrates the bank to retrieve data files, as well as kill its director and Providence operative Athena Savalas to prevent the Partners from discovering the data breach.

With the data acquired from the bank, Hall discovers the Partners paid large fees to Haven, a Maldives-based corporation that secretly creates new identities for wealthy criminals. To allow Hall to breach Haven's servers, 47 poses as a client to infiltrate the corporation's island resort and eliminate Haven's co-owners Ljudmila Vetrova, Steven Bradley, and Tyson Williams, to prevent them from resetting access to the servers at 10-hour intervals. Hall gains access to Haven's files on the Partners, and discovers that the controlling shares that comprise the backbone of Providence have not been allocated to the Partners' new identities, but rather to the Constant under his real name, Arthur Edwards. Diana rushes to check on Edwards but finds he has escaped. Hall obtains the locations of the Partners and informs 47 and Grey, who prepare to hunt them down, leading into the events of Hitman 3.

== Development and release ==
=== Restructuring at IO Interactive ===
Hitman 2 was developed by Danish video game studio IO Interactive. The game's predecessor, which had an episodic release, received critical acclaim but missed the sales expectations of franchise and studio owner Square Enix. The team began developing a sequel that would incorporate online modes and more gameplay features while experimenting with new gameplay mechanisms. While preparing for game's production, in May 2017, Square Enix announced it had sold IO Interactive to concentrate resources on other studios. While Square Enix negotiated with potential buyers of the studio, IO Interactive became independent following a management buyout. The management of the IO Interactive, which had about 200 employees, had to lay off 40% of the workforce due to limited cash flow. Hitman 2's development was about 25% completed.

After the buyout, IO Interactive owned the intellectual property (IP) of Hitman and decided to make the first episode free-to-play. The number of players nearly tripled and a significant portion of them bought the full game, ensuring a steady revenue for the studio. Due to limited manpower, the team had to limit the scale of the sequel and many planned features were cut. Development of Hitman 2 progressed quickly due to the foundation of Hitman (2016), which was originally designed as a platform known as World of Assassination to allow the developer to add content. The late success of Hitman helped IO Interactive show there was a demand for this type of game, and the studio secured additional funding for the game's production. Warner Bros. Interactive Entertainment signed to publish the sequel after partnering with IO Interactive on the Definitive Edition of Hitman. The game was declared gold on 27 September 2018 after two and a half years of production with a development cost of $40 million– a significant reduction in time and cost compared to its predecessor due to the shared engine and assets.

=== Design and story ===
The studio initially planned to include five massive maps in the game but decided to include six maps, some of which are smaller in scale. As the game was no longer episodic in structure, the team wanted the maps in the game to be more "consistent" in quality. The game's locations were chosen early in the game's development; each level was assigned to a "track team" that would be responsible for its level design, targets, and opportunities. As with the original Hitman, there are two types of levels in this game; "fortresses"—areas the player must infiltrate—and "snailhouses", levels with a circular design in which players are encouraged to explore the peripheral areas. The team visited the Maldives and Mumbai to ensure the locations in the game were authentic. According to the team, they did not intend to create an accurate version of these locations but wanted to "evoke the smells, tastes, and sounds of these places". One of the design principles was to ensure each map would have spaces players could familiarize themselves with while providing an element of surprise by showing operations that are typically conducted in secret. For instance, players can disguise themselves to enter areas of a bank that are off-limits to the public. IO experimented with the two established designs. For instance, player must identify an unknown civilian as the assassination target and eliminate them in a public area in Mumbai. Track teams needed to decide on the items featured in each level. Items and outfits generally are categorized as specific items used for mission stories, and items that were designed to fit each map's aesthetic. Hitman 2 added regional accents to many of its maps, such as the Mumbai and Colombia levels.

While Hitman served as an introductory chapter to the World of Assassination series, Hitman 2's story has a more prominent role and a more structured narrative. Hitman was described as a "white collar new money" crime thriller whereas Hitman 2 focuses on eccentric characters and "old money", which were inspired by secret societies. Much of the storytelling occurs within a level and during gameplay, and cutscenes mainly serve to tie together story threads. The abandonment of the episodic release model allowed IO Interactive to present a more cohesive story because players often forgot about narrative elements while they were playing Hitman due to its sparse release schedule. Like the first game, Agent 47 is a blank-state character and the story is mostly driven by his handler Diana Burnwood and Lucas Grey, both of whom have their own emotions, motivations and goals. Their presence allows Agent 47 to gradually develop as a character and foster change. The main story was written to motivate players to eliminate the targets. Mission stories in Hitman 2 were designed to encourage players to try out new gameplay features, tools, and costumes, while providing additional story content. Developers were careful to ensure the game was hitting the right tone, recasting a more mature-sounding actor for Alma Reynard (the target from the opening New Zealand mission) and giving her a new outfit after the original take was "too young-sounding" in order to avoid the game becoming "too creepy or sexually predatory".

The game includes extensive dark humour; early promotion of the game showed Agent 47 whacking NPCs with a fish. According to Markus Friedl, the game's executive producer, "this little bit of tongue-in-cheek humor [is] very much part of the Hitman DNA". David Bateson, who provides the voice of Agent 47, initially thought some of the dialogue was absurd but grew to appreciate it after understanding how mission stories work. According to Bateson, while Agent 47 is an expert at disguising himself, he is a terrible actor. He was instructed not to change his accent when disguised as other personalities and he delivered his lines in a "delightfully wooden way".

== Release ==
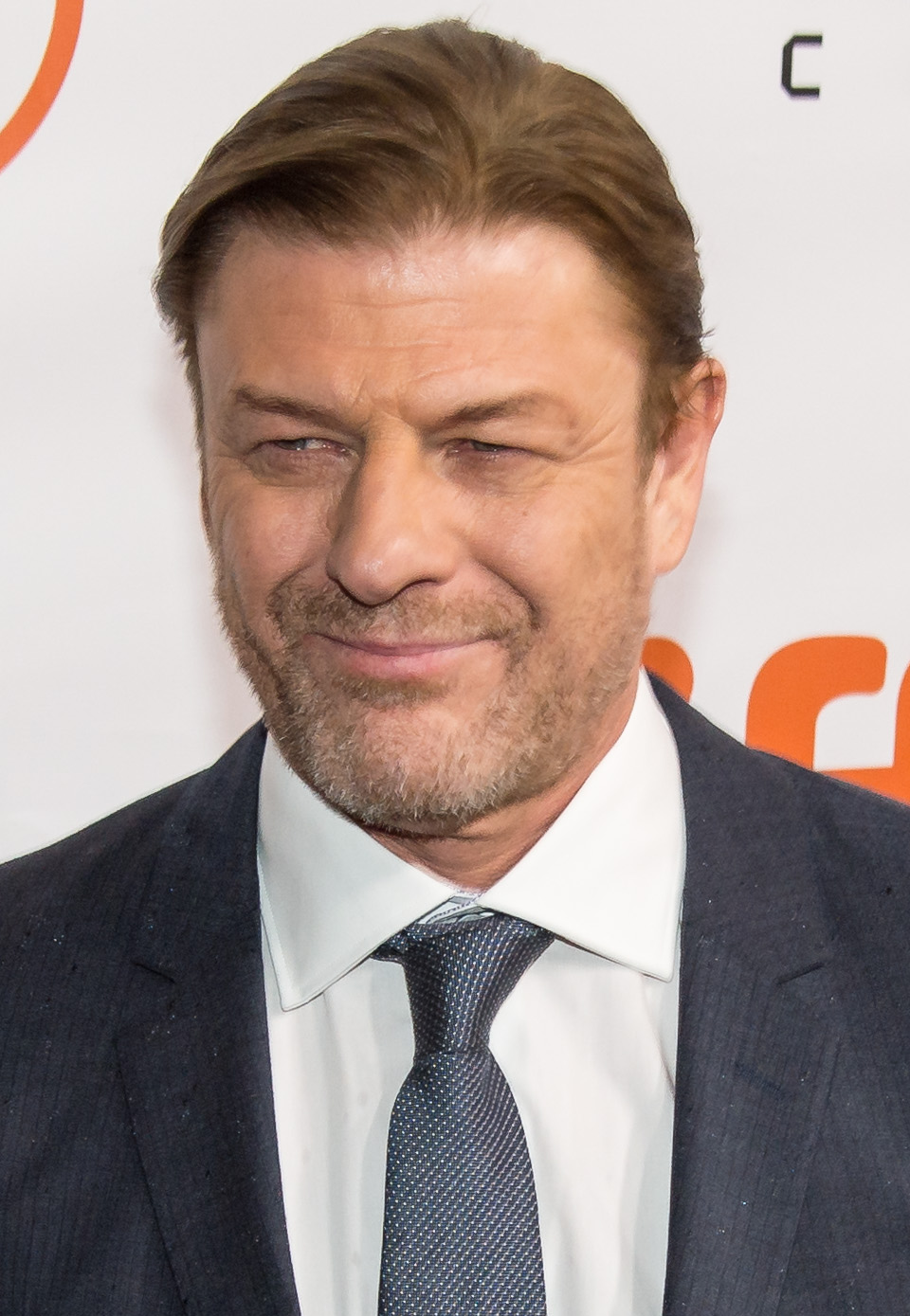
Sean Bean portrayed the game's first Elusive Target, "The Undying"

Warner Bros. announced Hitman 2 on 7 June 2018. The game did not follow its predecessor's episodic release model after the developers received negative feedback from players of the first game. Players who pre-ordered the game gained immediate access to Sniper Assassin mode. In July 2018, IO Interactive announced a competition for Sniper Assassin players; the top-three players with the highest scores would have the opportunity to have their names and likeness incorporated into the game's post-release content. Hitman 2 was released worldwide for PlayStation 4, Windows, and Xbox One on 13 November 2018, although those who pre-ordered the game's gold edition gained access to the game four days earlier. On 1 September 2020, IO Interactive released Hitman 2 for Google Stadia. The first level was made free-to-play on 27 February 2019.

IO Interactive extensively supported Hitman 2 with DLC, and regularly added escalation targets, challenge packs and elusive targets into the game. Sean Bean portrayed the game's first elusive target Mark Faba in the Miami map. This mission, which is titled "The Undying", was released on 18 November 2018, a week after the game's release. A temporary seasonal snow festival event set on the Hokkaido map from Hitman was added on 22 January 2019, later being permanently added in December that same year. A unique Halloween themed escalation called "The Mills Reverie" was released in October 2019.

The game suffered an early bug that was referred to as the "homing briefcase", which was triggered when a briefcase was thrown at a target; the briefcase would spin and fly slowly towards the target, even if the target moved around the level. The homing behaviour is an intentional feature of all thrown melee items in Hitman but the speed was unusual. IO patched the game and the developers acknowledged the bug, adding a special briefcase item, the Executive Briefcase MKII, that restored the slow-homing speed. The item was released on 8 August 2019 as part of the "Best Case Scenario" challenge pack.

Following the game's initial release, two paid expansions, each of which added new locations, missions, outfits, and weapons, were announced. The first expansion added a new main mission set in a bank in New York City as well as two single target "special assignment" missions set on variants of the Mumbai and Colombia maps on 25 June 2019. A new Sniper Assassin map called Hantu Port set in Singapore was released as part of the first expansion on 26 March 2019. The second expansion added another main mission set on Haven Island, an island in the Maldives, and two more special assignments set in Miami and Whittleton Creek on 24 September 2019. It also added another Sniper Assassin map set in a Siberian prison on 30 July 2019. The Bank and Haven Island missions continue the story from the main Hitman 2 campaign.

== Reception ==
=== Critical reception ===
Reception

Aggregate score
Aggregator	Score
Metacritic	(PC) 82/100 (PS4) 82/100 (XONE) 84/100

Review scores
Publication	Score
Destructoid	8/10
Game Informer	8/10
GameSpot	8/10
GamesRadar+	3.5/5
Giant Bomb	4/5
IGN	7.7/10
PC Gamer (UK)	84/100
The Guardian	4/5
USgamer	4.5/5
VentureBeat	91/100

Hitman 2 received "generally favorable" reviews, according to review aggregator platform Metacritic. Reviewers agreed the game does not significantly deviate from its predecessor's formula but they enjoyed the general gameplay loop and its improvements. Some game journalists said the episodic model of Hitman helped players thoroughly explore each level and were disappointed IO Interactive abandoned this release strategy for Hitman 2.

Hitman 2's design received critical praise. Phil Savage from PC Gamer strongly praised five of the game's six maps, and described them as "large" and "intricate". He added the quality of the maps is more consistent than those of the first game. He said, however, Hitman 2 did not extensively experiment with the formula and that the game simply "riffs on familiar design principles". Writing for GameSpot, Edmon Tran described the maps as "overwhelming in the best way possible" and singled out Mumbai as one of the game's standout maps. Many reviewers praised the diversity of the maps, each of which is set in visually unique locations with their own characters and routes. Caty McCarthy from USgamer praised IO for perfecting the formula established in its predecessor and said all levels reached the quality of Sapienza, which is widely recognized as Hitman's best map. Destructoid's Chris Carter agreed, and said "Hitman 2 is a colossal collection of puzzles begging to be solved through multiple playthroughs". The Legacy content received praise for introducing gameplay adjustments to older Hitman levels.

The gameplay received generally positive reviews. Several reviewers said the game offers players too much guidance, making exploration and discovery of creative assassinations less organic. Savage liked the gameplay enhancements but said familiar problems of the franchise had not been solved. Tran enjoyed the core gameplay loop of slowly discovering a location and its stories. While the gameplay is built on trial and error, he said the game becomes more exciting when the players' plan fails, forcing them to improvise. IGN's Ryan McCaffery praised the developers for allowing players to freely approach their objectives and liked the mission stories for presenting memorable and unique gameplay moments, and making successful assassinations a satisfying gameplay experience. McCarthy praised the dialogue of the mission stories, describing it as "sharper and funnier", and adding the script "adds to the silly fun of the Hitman universe". Many reviewers agreed players can only understand the intricacies of the game's system and the availability of the options presented to them by replaying it. Minor gameplay adjustments IO Interactive added to the game were also appreciated.

Ghost mode had a divided reception; some reviewers said its design does not well complement the slow, methodical gameplay of the single-player campaign. Some reviewers, however, said it is a fun, satisfying experience. Some reviewers expressed disappointment Sniper Assassin had only one map at launch.

The game's story received mixed reviews. McCaffery was disappointed by the overarching story; he called it "absurdly dumb" and poorly presented, and said the game's attempt at exploring Agent 47's backstory is as bad as that of the 2007 Hitman film. Brad Shoemaker, writing for Giant Bomb, found the main story surprisingly engaging; he described it as a "taut international cat-and-mouse thriller", and appreciated the story for raising the stakes and resolving the mysteries of the first game. He agreed, however, the game does not have the production quality of Hitman, which is evidenced by the lack of CGI cutscenes, instead opting for static images and voice-overs. Writing for Game Informer, Jeff Marchiafava said the storyboard sequences are "cheap and disappointing", especially since the first game has lavishly produced videos and in-engine graphics.

=== Sales ===
Hitman 2 debuted at tenth place in the UK's all-format sales charts. It was released in a competitive week that also saw the launches of Pokémon: Let's Go, Spyro Reignited Trilogy and Fallout 76. In Japan, the PlayStation 4 version sold 10,162 copies in its debut week, making it the week's fifth-best-selling retail game in the country. IO Interactive CEO Hakan Abrak said releasing the game so close to other blockbuster titles such as Red Dead Redemption 2 negatively impacted the game's sales. Hitman 2, however, recouped its development cost more quickly than Hitman had.

=== Accolades ===
Hitman 2 was nominated for Game of the Year during the 2018 Steam Awards. It was voted the best stealth game of the year at the 2018 Global Game Awards. The game was also nominated for "Game, Franchise Adventure" and "Control Design, 3D" at the NAVGTR Awards. David Bateson was nominated for "Outstanding Video Game Character, Best Voiceover" for his performance as Agent 47 in Hitman 2 at the 2019 Society of Voice Arts And Sciences Awards.

== Sequel ==
Hitman 3, the sequel to Hitman 2 and the conclusion of the World of Assassination trilogy, was released in January 2021. It was published by IO Interactive. Because the sequel does not include any competitive online modes, IO Interactive shut down the Hitman 2 servers on 31 August 2021. While Sniper Assassin can be played offline, Ghost Mode and the online aspect of Sniper Assassin became unplayable once the servers were taken offline. The Ambrose Island location added to Hitman 3 for free on 26 July 2022 is set during the events of Hitman 2, between the Whittleton Creek and Isle of Sgàil missions.
