= Deus Ex: The Fall =

2013 video game

- Developer: N-Fusion Interactive (Note: Additional development by mobile division of Square Enix, supervision by Eidos-Montréal.)
- Publisher: Square Enix
- Director: Jeffrey Birns
- Producer: Joe Parisi
- Designer: Tyler Munden
- Programmers: Jason Zisk; Matt Orlando; Josh Letellier
- Artist: Carissa Isolano
- Writers: Tyler Munden; James Swallow
- Composer: Michael McCann
- Series: Deus Ex
- Engine: Unity
- Platforms: Android; iOS; Windows
- Release: iOS: WW: July 11, 2013; Android: WW: January 22, 2014; Windows: WW: March 18, 2014; EU: May 9, 2014 (retail)
- Genres: Action role-playing, first-person shooter, stealth
- Mode: Single-player

Deus Ex: The Fall is a 2013 action role-playing video game developed by N-Fusion Interactive under the supervision of Eidos-Montréal. A spin-off of the Deus Ex series, the game was published by Square Enix for iOS in 2013. Android and Windows versions were released in 2014. The gameplay—combining first-person shooter, stealth and role-playing elements—features exploration and combat in Panama City and quests which grant experience and allow customization of the main character's abilities.

The Fall is set in a near-future cyberpunk Earth where the covert Illuminati seek to exert control over the world as a technological revolution prompts the development of advanced artificial organs dubbed "Augmentations". Set after the spin-off novel Deus Ex: Icarus Effect but during the events of Deus Ex: Human Revolution, the story follows fugitives Ben Saxon and Anna Kelso as they hide from the forces of the Illuminati. While intended as the first in an episodic narrative, the story remains incomplete.

Development of The Fall started in 2012 and lasted twelve months. The team, between twelve and fifteen people, also consulted staff from Human Revolution to ensure consistency between the two products. The team used assets from Human Revolution as references to create the game's environments, and Michael McCann composed new tracks for the game. Reception of the mobile version was mixed, but many critics praised it as a serviceable attempt at translating Deus Ex into the mobile format. The Windows version saw negative responses from critics due to technical and control issues.

== Gameplay ==
Protagonist Ben Saxon fights against a mech during one section of the game.

Deus Ex: The Fall is an action role-playing game with incorporated first-person shooter and stealth mechanics. Players take the role of Ben Saxon, a man equipped with mechanical cybernetic implants called Augmentations. Players navigate the game's environments in first-person perspective, though some actions switch to a third-person view. In these environments, players can perform contextual actions such as climbing ladders, using cover, and talking with non-playable characters (NPCs) that will advance both the main story quest and provide optional side quests. Completing quests, along with other actions such as combat with enemies and environmental interaction, awards experience points (EXP).

There are a variety of ways to approach the game's situations: players can use a violent approach and shoot their way through environments while using cover to hide from enemy fire. Alternately, Saxon can take a stealthy approach, avoiding guards and security devices, again using cover to avoid enemy sight lines. Saxon can move between cover elements and aim around corners while staying hidden from guards and security devices. The melee takedown system offers lethal and non-lethal options, in addition to an assortment of lethal and non-lethal weapons.

A key part of Saxon's abilities are Augmentations, which can be acquired and upgraded using Praxis Kits either bought from special vendors, found in the game environments, or automatically unlocked by gathering enough EXP. Augmentations cover different parts of the body, from the head to limbs and torso, and range from passive enhancements such as hacking upgrades and expanded dialogue options with NPCs, to active upgrades which expand combat options and movement abilities.

While exploring, Saxon can find both story cues and additional lore on the world through portable devices and computers. To access in-game computers and terminal consoles without a passcode requires players to complete a hacking minigame. Weapons, ammunition and items such as Praxis Kits are purchased directly through the inventory using Credits. The game includes microtransactions which lets players spend real money on Credits to buy items and ammunition. Credits can also be found while exploring the game. The microtransactions were removed for the Windows port.

== Synopsis ==
=== Setting and characters ===
The Fall is set during the year 2027, taking place in parallel to the opening sections of Deus Ex: Human Revolution. The Deus Ex series is set in a cyberpunk future rife with secret organizations and conspiracies, including the Illuminati. Advances in biotechnology and cybernetics have led to the development of "augmentations" (artificial organs capable of improving and enhancing the human body's performance) that require doses of a limited and expensive immunosuppressive drug called Neuropozyne to prevent implant rejections. The development of augmentation technology has triggered controversy and divided society between those who use augmentations and those who are either morally opposed, too poor to afford them, or whose bodies actively reject them. The story focuses on events in Panama City, though some scenes occur in Costa Rica and Moscow.

The main protagonist is British-born Ben Saxon, an augmented mercenary and former member of the Tyrants, a group in the employ of private company Belltower and their Illuminati sponsors. Saxon looks after former federal agent Anna Kelso, who, together with Saxon, was one of the protagonists of the spin-off novel Deus Ex: Icarus Effect. They are supported by Janus, the unseen leader of the Juggernaut Collective hacktivist group; and Alejandra "Alex" Vega, a Belltower pilot who later joins Janus for the events of Deus Ex: Mankind Divided. Characters from Human Revolution and the wider Deus Ex universe also feature, including Illuminati member Bob Page and news reader Eliza Cassan.

=== Plot ===
The Fall takes place during the six-month period when Human Revolution protagonist Adam Jensen is recovering from an attack on his employer Sarif Industries by the Tyrants, and acts as a sequel to the novel Deus Ex: Icarus Effect. The story of The Fall was designated as the first episode in a longer narrative. No further episodes have been released, leaving the story incomplete.

Hiding in their Costa Rica safe house during a worldwide Neuropozyne shortage, Saxon and Kelso are beginning to suffer the effects of implant rejection. Ben recalls the loss of his squadmate Sam Duarte in the Australian Civil War, and how Duarte's death lead to Ben's recruitment, and ultimately his defection from the Tyrants. On advice from Janus, Saxon travels to Panama City to get a supply of Neuropozyne, discovering a cheaper drug called Riezene is both entering clinical trials and being sold on the street. Saxon eventually acquires Neuropozyne for himself and Anna from local doctor Camila Cardoso after he investigates the black market for Riezene, discovering that his old employer, Belltower Associates, is supervising illegal and dangerous population testing of Riezene on behalf of its manufacturer, Zaaphire Biotech.

Aided by the disgruntled Vega, Saxon tries to warn an inspector of the World Health Organization about Belltower's involvement. When he reaches him, the Tyrants assassinate the inspector. The heavily-augmented assassin is Duarte, who hesitantly spares Saxon and escapes. Shocked, Saxon warns Kelso not to return to the safe house. Determined to follow the trail, he infiltrates Belltower's base of operations to rendezvous with Vega. They depart Panama, heading for Zaaphire Biotech headquarters in Canberra, Australia. The game ends on a cliffhanger, with the Tyrants swearing to Page that Saxon will die.

== Development ==
After the success of Human Revolution, publisher Square Enix and developer Eidos-Montréal sought to expand the series into other areas, appealing to both core fans and newcomers. With this in mind, they decided to create a dedicated mobile game that would expand the lore of the series while translating the gameplay elements onto the platform. They decided to work with an external studio with a track record for high-quality mobile games. Approaching N-Fusion Interactive with the concept, N-Fusion pitched a sequel to Icarus Effect. From this point, it was a collaborative process between N-Fusion, Eidos Montréal and the mobile division of Square Enix; while the other two acted as support and provided overall creative control, N-Fusion was in charge of development.

N-Fusion developed the game and came up with the initial concept, working closely with staff from Human Revolution during production; those from Human Revolution included director Jean-François Dugas, lead writer Mary DeMarle, co-writer and Icarus Effect author James Swallow, and art director Jonathan Jacques-Belletête. Human Revolution composer Michael McCann created original music for the game. Production lasted twelve months, with a core team of between twelve and fifteen people assigned to it. Dugas later praised N-Fusion for being both willing to develop the project and able to tell their partners about aspects that were not working or could not be done. N-Fusion CEO and game director Jeffrey Birns remembered The Fall as the studio's most challenging project at the time due to the need to represent the different gameplay and narrative elements from the Deus Ex universe, in addition to adapting the complex control scheme for mobile devices.

The game's story was created by designer Tyler Munden to act as a direct sequel to Icarus Effect, with Swallow helping with script writing during production. The team collaborated closely with DeMarle and Dugas to keep the game's continuity in line with Human Revolution. Kelso was considered as a possible protagonist during early production, but due to their tight schedule, they chose Saxon as the protagonist since they already had stock character movements suited to him. The international settings were chosen to match the globe-trotting storyline of Icarus Effect. The black-and-gold aesthetic of Human Revolution was directly carried over into The Fall. The team initially used reduced assets from Human Revolution, but due to problems making the game work, they had to create mobile-friendly environments using the original assets as references. At one stage, N-Fusion created a nightclub setting that used purple as its key color, but Eidos Montréal had them change it as purple was only to be associated with the newsreader Cassan.

While the decision to bring Deus Ex to mobile was initially unpopular with fans following the game's announcement, Square Enix stated that The Fall was intended as a console-like experience rather than a "light" version of the series. The biggest challenge during development was the control scheme, which had to both work with the complex gameplay of Deus Ex and function using the simple control scheme options available on mobile and tablets. The development mandate was to create a console-quality experience for mobile on a limited budget. The team met with multiple difficulties making Deus Ex gameplay work within the limited hardware of mobiles. There were several times where the game refused to function. Memory limitations were a constant problem throughout development. Due to hardware restrictions, some gameplay elements such as jumping had to be cut. The Fall was developed using the Unity game engine, whose user-friendly architecture helped. The choice of Unity also eased development for Android devices, which had different hardware specs from iOS devices. Production of the Android version met with separate difficulties to the iOS version. Microtransactions were included due to it being the dominant mobile business model for the mobile market, but they were designed so players could complete the game without using them.

== Release ==
By early 2013, Square Enix had reportedly trademarked the phrase "Deus Ex: The Fall" and registered related domain names. In June 2013, Eidos Montréal released a teaser trailer and Square Enix formally announced the game for iOS and Android. Square Enix showcased the game at the June 2013 E3 expo and released additional gameplay footage and screenshots. The game released worldwide for iOS on July 10, 2013, a day earlier than initially announced.

Upon release, players on jailbroken iOS devices were unable to fire weapons in-game, which caused some controversy. Square Enix later confirmed and released a patch to fix the issue. The game was later patched to both include support for iPad 2 models and fix bugs and glitches along with improvements to the artificial intelligence (AI). Shortly after the announcement, the game was also confirmed for Android devices. This version was eventually released on January 22, 2014.

A Windows port was later announced and released via Steam on March 18, 2014. The port included platform-based control options, Steam cards and achievements, and graphical options. The team also removed microtransactions and improved the AI. N-Fusion developed the Windows port, later saying that their greatest difficulty was adjusting the controls from touchpad-based mobile play to the Windows options of gamepad or keyboard and mouse.

== Reception ==
Reception

Aggregate score
| Aggregator | Score |
|---|---|
| Metacritic | iOS: 69/100; PC: 45/100 |

Review scores
| Publication | Score |
|---|---|
| Eurogamer | iOS: 5/10 |
| GameSpot | PC: 4/10 |
| IGN | iOS: 8.2/10; PC: 3/10 |
| PC Gamer (US) | PC: 40/100 |
| TouchArcade | iOS: 4.5/5 |
| Digital Spy | iOS: 3/5 |

The Fall garnered a "mixed or average" reception according to review aggregator site Metacritic, which gave it a score of 69 out of 100 points based on 43 reviews. TouchArcade acknowledged criticism that the game was published on iOS rather than PC or console, but described it as a high-quality and engaging experience: "it reeks of 'console quality' in terms of story, production values and visuals, and it's just straight-up fun to play." Eurogamer's Christian Donlan gave the game a low score, citing game-crashing bugs, awkward combat and controls, repetitive graphics and shaky story and voice acting, but still praised the touchscreen functionality and general atmosphere. He concluded that while it had all the right elements for a Deus Ex game, it lacked energy and execution. Digital Spy said that "Deus Ex: The Fall is a short but sweet spin-off for fans of Deus Ex: Human Revolution, just make sure you double check your iOS device's firmware and hardware before downloading".

IGN's Justin Davis praised the game's story, presentation, exploration and streamlined build, but criticized the awkward combat. He concluded that "frustrating combat aside, it's almost astounding how successful The Fall is at distilling the core Deus Ex experience onto a mobile device. The mysterious and well-told story, steady stream of powerful new augments, and impressive game world all combined to create a mobile experience I didn't want to put down after I started". Reviewing the Android version, Ryan Ballard of Droid Gamers was generally positive about the game, praising the narrative and art design; his greatest criticism with the former was the incomplete nature of the story. He also found the color palette repetitive and some gameplay structures frustrating.

The Windows version received "generally unfavorable reviews", attaining a 45/100 rating on Metacritic based on 14 reviews. IGN reviewer Craig Pearson focused on the game's poor adaptation, particularly the lack of a jump button, inability to remap controls, and issues with the game not properly responding to menu actions and button presses. He concluded, "Beneath the struggle with terrible controls and bugs, there are vents to sneak through, email to hack, and people to confuse. It's something that could shine on the PC if any sort of care was taken." Daniel Hindes of GameSpot praised N-Fusion's original effort to capture the aesthetics of Human Revolution on iOS while strongly criticizing them for failing to take advantage of the expanded capabilities of the new platform, especially for retaining the limitations required by the original interface. Hindes also criticized the limited fixed-binding controls, also complaining of unresponsiveness. PC Gamer reviewer Andy Kelly called the game "truly one of the worst [Windows] ports I've played in some time", in part citing the game's unresponsive controls, particularly in menus.

Speaking in 2014, Square Enix's Western CEO Phil Rogers described The Fall as a means of getting Deus Ex into a wider audience using the casual gaming market created by mobiles while also appealing to series fans. While he praised N-Fusion's efforts in translating the gameplay onto mobile devices, he said that "console experiences on mobile and tablet" were too much of a minority in mobile gaming at the time. Following the game's release, Square Enix began internal discussions around the project based on feedback, including whether its controls could have been improved, to use in future mobile game projects. Rogers said that the game only partly achieved its intended goals. Swallow also confirmed that a second mobile game featuring Saxon and Kelso was planned, but "never went ahead".
