= Deus Ex: Human Revolution – The Missing Link =

- Developer: Eidos Montréal
- Publisher: Square Enix
- Director: Jean-François Dugas
- Producer: David Anfossi
- Designer: Antoine Thisdale
- Programmer: Simon Hamelin
- Artist: Jonathan Jacques-Belletête
- Writer: Mary DeMarle
- Composer: Michael McCann
- Series: Deus Ex
- Platforms: Microsoft Windows; PlayStation 3; Xbox 360; Mac OS X; Wii U
- Release: October 18, 2011
- Genres: Action role-playing, first-person shooter, stealth
- Mode: Single-player

Deus Ex: Human Revolution – The Missing Link is a standalone downloadable episode for the action role-playing stealth video game Deus Ex: Human Revolution. Developed by Eidos Montréal and published by Square Enix, it was released digitally worldwide in October 2011 for Microsoft Windows, PlayStation 3, Xbox 360. Later releases of the main game made The Missing Link available on OS X and Wii U.

The Missing Link is set during a narrative gap late in the events of Human Revolution. While en route to a secret research facility hidden inside a stasis pod, protagonist Adam Jensen is discovered, imprisoned and tortured by officers of private security company Belltower Associates. Escaping, he must first recover his equipment, then discover the secrets of the Belltower facility, aided by a mysterious hacker and sympathetic figures within Belltower ranks. Gameplay is carried over from Human Revolution: displayed primarily from a first-person perspective with both stealth and action-based paths of progression through environments.

Initially unplanned, The Missing Link was developed by Human Revolution's core staff, including producer David Anfossi, director Jean-François Dugas, writer Mary DeMarle, and composer Michael McCann. The story was designed as a standalone experience, partially due to the technical and aesthetic improvements the team had made. A boss battle was designed to allow for multiple solutions, in contrast to the limited action-based approaches of the main game's boss fights. Reception was generally positive: despite some mixed opinions on the story, praise was given to the improved visuals and gameplay.

== Gameplay ==
Protagonist Adam Jensen in cover during the opening of The Missing Link: Adam has been stripped of his gear, forcing him to scavenge for weaponry and equipment.

Deus Ex: Human Revolution – The Missing Link is a downloadable episode, acting as a side story within the events of Deus Ex: Human Revolution. Like the main game, The Missing Link is played from a first-person perspective, using action role-playing and stealth gameplay elements. The style in which the player can navigate environments and overcome obstacles is relatively open: they can either use an action-based approach involving combat with guns, or use stealth to progress through the game undetected. The environments include security devices such as lasers and cameras. These can be negated by hacking terminals or recovering key codes from datapads retrieved from the environments or defeated enemies. Tactics for defeating enemies are also flexible, with players being offered both lethal and non-lethal takedown options for stealth attacks and weaponry. At the start of The Missing Link, protagonist Adam Jensen is stripped of his equipment and augmentations, forcing him to find them again. His augmentations can be upgraded using collectable Praxis Points. The augmentations Adam can be given are separate from the main game, allowing alternate character customization.

== Plot ==
The Missing Link takes place during the events of Human Revolution: after staging an explosion in the docks of Hengsha, Adam Jensen smuggles himself on board a ship bound for a secret research base inside a cryosleep pod. Adam is discovered and captured aboard the ship. Two Belltower commanders, Pieter Burke and Netanya Keitner, torture him for information on his identity. After the EMP chair holding him captive mysteriously deactivates, Adam is able to retrieve his equipment with the help of an unknown hacker who contacts him via radio. The ship docks at Rifleman Bank Station, a seaborne regional Belltower supply hub. After escaping into the station, Adam discovers that it was Keitner who set him free. Disillusioned with the unethical nature of local Belltower operations, she wants Adam to find concrete proof of illegal research that she can use to deliver to Interpol. She also instructs Adam to obtain weaponry from Garvin Quinn, resident technician and black market weapons trader.

After infiltrating the station's secure wing, Adam discovers a massive detention camp with hundreds of detainees. After talking to one of the prisoners, Nina Sullivan, and overhearing a conversation between Burke and two of the scientists, Gary Savage and Tiffany Kavanagh, he confirms that innocents are kidnapped across the globe to further the Illuminati research that Jensen is investigating, and that the experiments prove fatal to the majority of subjects. With Burke's spare retinal prosthesis, and Quinn's technical expertise, Adam is able to gain access to a concealed elevator that takes him to a massive undersea research facility. He confronts Kavanagh who, already having misgivings about the inhumane nature of the research, agrees to turn informant. Burke discovers Keitner's mutiny, and she is killed by his soldiers. Burke then initiates "Code Yellow": pumping toxic gas into both the detention camp and the research facility to eliminate any witnesses. Adam can either redirect the gas to save either Kavanagh or the prisoners, find and sabotage the gas distributor to save everyone, or simply do nothing and allow both parties to be killed.

Adam then backtracks through the base and confronts Burke, who can be either killed or incapacitated. Adam is then contacted by the hacker, who informs him that another ship is about to depart to Reed's location. He then reveals himself as both "Quinn" and Keitner's Interpol contact. He explained that he was withholding the truth from both Jensen and Keitner to use them as pawns against Belltower, and by extension, the Illuminati. Quinn, after commenting on Adam's actions, places him in a new cryosleep pod. The pod is delivered via helicopter onto the departing ship, while Quinn contacts the mysterious hacker "Janus", informing him of the success of the operation and debating Adam's future potential in combating the Illuminati.

== Development ==
Downloadable content (DLC) was initially not part of the development team's plans. The Missing Link began development later in development, when the main game's visual theme had been finalized. Only the core developers were involved in creating The Missing Link, though development on the DLC did not take a high priority for some time as it would take resources away from the development of Human Revolution. Director Jean-François Dugas, producer David Anfossi, and art director Jonathan Jacques-Belletête all returned to their previous roles. The main designer was Antoine Thisdale. Main writer Mary DeMarle returned to write the scenario, alongside supplementary writer and author James Swallow. Additional music was composed for The Missing Link by the game's composer Michael McCann. He wanted to include music from the DLC in the game's official soundtrack, but recording for the release was already complete, and scheduling conflicts prevented him from including any music in the soundtrack. Despite this, he still wished to release the DLC soundtrack.

Full focus shifted onto The Missing Link when development ended on Human Revolution, with the main game's staff bringing their experience to bear upon the DLC when building its environments. The story was designed so that it would not spoil the events of the main narrative, but instead be a self-contained experience that would provide more context to the setting. The game's title referred to both its status as filling a narrative gap, and an in-game plot element. The DLC was developed as a stand-alone experience, accessible through the main menu independent of the player's place within the main game. This was due to technical problems related to the improvement work at transitioning from one to the other at its chronological point: the higher detail and polish would have made the experience jarring for players.

The Missing Link provided an opportunity for improving the visuals and gameplay. The visuals were given more contrast, so objects stood out more. Improvements to the lighting was a major focus for the team. The game's engine was also improved, along with character animations and facial movement. Due to the relatively small size of the DLC environment, developers did not need to focus on a raised concern in the main game about repeating character faces and voices. An element that had been generally criticized by both critics and players of the original game was the boss fights, which had been outsourced to Grip Entertainment and consequently did not follow the player-driven gameplay style of the rest of the game, instead focusing heavily on action. While a boss fight was included in The Missing Link, it was entirely developed in-house by Eidos Montréal staff and allowed for a variety of solutions for defeating the boss, including non-lethal options.

== Release ==
Plans for a DLC were first announced in 2010 at that year's Gamescom event, where it was stated that it would be an extension to the main narrative. It was later teased by Eidos Montréal through cryptic clues on their website, eventually revealing the DLC one month after the main game's release. The Missing Link was released on October 18, 2011 on Steam for Microsoft Windows personal computers, Xbox Live for Xbox 360, and October 19 on PlayStation Network (PSN) for PlayStation 3. In Japan, the console versions of the DLC were released on March 7, 2012 for PSN and March 20 for Xbox Live.

The DLC was included as part of Feral Interactive's port for OS X, released on April 26, 2012. The Missing Link was subsequently included with other additional content in the director's cut edition of the base game, released on its original platforms and Wii U. The port's developers applied the technical and gameplay enhancements first developed for The Missing Link to Human Revolution. The director's cut was released on October 25, 2013 for PC, Xbox 360, PS3 and Wii U. An OS X port, again handled by Feral Interactive, was released on April 16, 2014.

== Reception ==
Reception

Aggregate score
Aggregator	Score
Metacritic	PC: 73/100 (14 reviews); PS3: 78/100 (10 reviews); 360: 76/100 (18 reviews)

Review scores
Publication	Score
Destructoid	8/10
Eurogamer	6/10
GameSpot	7/10
IGN	8/10
Official Xbox Magazine (UK)	8/10
PC Gamer (UK)	90%

The Missing Link received generally positive reviews from critics. Destructoid's Maurice Tan enjoyed the story despite it not adding anything to the overall experience of Human Revolution and noted that the major choices lacked impact. Simon Parkin of Eurogamer found no strong narrative hook, feeling it existed more to plug the main game's narrative gap. GameSpot's Kevin VanOrd praised the story for its emotive moments and strong voice acting. Official Xbox Magazine's Edwin Evans-Thirlwell found the plot undermined by the villain and some poor dialogue. Tom Francis of PC Gamer, while giving minimal comment on the story as a whole, noted that it had a strong conclusion.

Tan, despite noting backtracking, praised the mixture of gameplay types carried over from the main game. VanOrd's positive opinion on the gameplay was shared with that of Human Revolution. He also praised the concluding boss fight, but felt that the experience was bogged down with excessive backtracking through environments. Parkin again noted the carried-over mechanics of the main game, but said that the confined environments made the limited choices feel "negative rather than liberating". Keza MacDonald of IGN again praised the gameplay mixture and improved mechanics for the boss fight and, like other reviewers, criticized the amount of backtracking through environments. Evans-Thirlwell enjoyed being able to rebuild Adam's augmentation set-up and multiple gameplay options. Francis echoed the praise for the boss gameplay, despite finding it more linear than the main game.

VanOrd praised both the art style and the rise in technical finesse for facial movements despite the latter still looking stilted, but noted that problems with enemy AI were carried over from the main game. Parkin negatively noted the "dark, repetitive" environments, while MacDonald praised the improved lighting and found the music serviceable: her major technical criticism was long loading times on the console versions. Its standing as DLC divided opinions. Tan praised its separation from the main game, and called it "a well-produced piece of DLC with a level of quality that fits right in with the main game both in terms of quality and atmosphere". Parkin felt it was too insubstantial to stand on its own despite positively noting it as a means of experimenting with augmentations prior to performing similar upgrades in the main game. MacDonald was more positive, echoing Tan's sentiments of it being a strong piece of DLC despite lacking replay value. Both Frances and Evans-Thirlwell were positive, echoing MacDoland's praise of the DLC's standalone strength.
