= Deus Ex: Mankind Divided =

2016 video game

- Developer: Eidos-Montréal (Note: Ported to Microsoft Windows by Nixxes Software and Advanced Micro Devices, and to Linux and macOS by Feral Interactive)
- Publisher: Square Enix (Note: Linux and macOS published by Feral Interactive) (Note: Self-published under the name Eidos Interactive Corp following sale of Eidos-Montréal to Embracer Group in 2022)
- Director: Jean-François Dugas
- Producers: Olivier Proulx; Marc-André Dufort
- Designer: Richard Knight
- Programmers: David Gallardo; Daniel Letendre; Sébastien Michel
- Artists: Martin Dubeau; Jonathan Jacques-Belletête; Laura Gallagher; Bruno Gauthier-LeBlanc
- Writer: Mary DeMarle
- Composers: Michael McCann; Sascha Dikiciyan
- Series: Deus Ex
- Engine: Dawn Engine
- Platforms: Microsoft Windows; PlayStation 4; Xbox One; Linux; macOS
- Release: August 23, 2016: Microsoft Windows, PlayStation 4, Xbox One; August 23, 2016; Linux; November 3, 2016; macOS; December 12, 2017
- Genres: Action role-playing, first-person shooter, stealth
- Mode: Single-player

Deus Ex: Mankind Divided is a 2016 action role-playing game developed by Eidos-Montréal and published by Square Enix for Windows, Xbox One and PlayStation 4 in August 2016. Versions for Linux and macOS systems were released in 2016 and 2017, respectively. The game is the sequel to Deus Ex: Human Revolution and the fourth installment in the Deus Ex series. The gameplay combines first-person shooter, stealth and role-playing elements. It features exploration and combat in environments connected to the main hub of Prague and quests which grant experience and allow customization of the main character's abilities with Praxis Kits. Conversations between characters have a variety of responses, with options in conversations and at crucial story points affecting how events play out. Players can complete Breach, a cyberspace-set challenge mode, in addition to the main campaign. Breach was later released as a free, standalone product.

Set two years after Human Revolution in 2029, the world is divided between normal humans and those with advanced, controversial artificial organs dubbed "augmentations". After a violent event known as the Aug Incident, augmented people have been segregated; this prompts heated debate and an era of "mechanical apartheid". Main protagonist Adam Jensen, equipped with advanced new augmentations after Human Revolution, is a double agent for the hacker group Juggernaut Collective to expose the Illuminati, which is orchestrating events behind the scenes. The story explores themes of transhumanism and discrimination, using the series' recurring cyberpunk setting and conspiracy theory motif.

Production of Mankind Divided began after completion of the Human Revolution expansion The Missing Link. Eidos-Montréal wanted to improve its gameplay and narrative, and address criticism from fans and reviewers of Human Revolution. The gameplay and graphics engine were rebuilt from scratch for next-generation hardware. A greater focus on realism and the story's darker themes resulted in a subdued color range compared to the previous game. Human Revolution composer Michael McCann returned to write the score with newcomers Sascha Dikiciyan and Ed Harrison.

Mankind Divided was announced in 2015, after a lengthy promotional campaign. Subsequent marketing slogans were criticized by journalists, and a divisive tier-based preorder campaign was cancelled due to player backlash. Post-launch, story-based downloadable content was released in 2016. The game received positive reviews from critics, who praised its narrative, graphics and gameplay. Criticism focused on the brevity of its campaign and the handling of its themes. Although the game initially placed highly on sales charts, it was rumored to be a commercial disappointment, and as of 2026 no subsequent Deus Ex games have been produced.

== Gameplay ==
A street in Prague (the game's main hub level), with the HUD (with available hotkey options), Adam's health and current weapon, ammunition level, and remote hacking UI

Deus Ex: Mankind Divided is an action role-playing game with first-person shooter and stealth mechanics. Players take the role of Adam Jensen, a man equipped with mechanical cybernetic implants called augmentations. The game's environments, ranging from open-world hubs to more scripted environments, are explored in first person; actions such as hiding behind cover, conversing with non-playable characters (NPCs) and some attack animations switch to a third-person view. In these environments, players can find NPCs that will advance the main story quest and optional side quests; completing quests and other actions such as finding hidden areas reward Adam with experience points (EXP). EXP unlock Praxis Points to upgrade his abilities. Also accessible are black-market vendors which supply equipment, materials and weapons for credits, the in-game currency.

Players can approach situations in a number of ways; a violent approach shoots their way through environments while using cover to hide from enemy fire. Adam can take a stealthy approach, avoiding guards and security devices (again using cover to avoid enemy sight lines). He can move between cover elements and around corners while staying hidden. The melee takedown system offers lethal and non-lethal options, in addition to a variety of lethal and non-lethal weapons. Adam can move the bodies of enemies into hiding places, preventing them from being seen and raising an alarm. Adam's augmentations can be acquired and upgraded with Praxis Kits bought from vendors, found in the game environments or automatically unlocked by gathering enough EXP; higher-level augmentations require more Praxis Kits to unlock. Augmentation functions range from passive enhancements to Adam's vision or damage resistance; to active upgrades, such as increased strength or the ability to fall from great heights without being injured. The majority of augmentations are dependent on Adam's energy level, deactivating after energy has been drained. Other "experimental" augmentations force players to permanently deactivate another augmentation to prevent Adam from overheating.

Non-lethal and lethal weapons, bought or picked up from enemies, can be modified with parts salvaged from other areas. New components and elements, such as the single-use multitool unlocking devices, can be bought from vendors or built from crafting parts in each area. Using parts to craft new components sometimes requires blueprints discovered in the overworld. Adam can hack a variety of devices, with the hacking divided into two modes. The first has Adam hacking static devices such as computers, which triggers a minigame allowing players to capture points (nodes) and access a device. The second mode involves hacking devices such as laser traps and security robots, triggering an altered minigame where zones on a graph must be triggered to deactivate a device within a time limit.

Adam converses with NPCs about the main and side quests, and some of the conversations add information to the game's world. He has several conversation options, which affect its outcome; choosing the correct option can help complete objectives, and choosing an incorrect option closes the route and forces the player to find an alternate solution. A "social" augmentation better reads an NPC's expression and evaluates their psychological profile, improving the chance of selecting the correct dialogue option. Most boss battles can be negated by using certain dialogue options.

In Breach mode, the player is a hacker infiltrating the Palisade Bank to retrieve data from Deus Ex companies and escape within a time limit. Similar to an arcade game with a surreal, polygonal graphic style, the player has an avatar and navigates environments with unique augmentations. The enemy monitor alters its responses, depending on player approach to a level. Although Mankind Divided does not have a multiplayer mode, Breach has leaderboards which allow players to compare scores and positions online. Its rewards for completing levels are random or alterations to gameplay elements in individual maps.

== Synopsis ==
=== Setting ===
Mankind Divided is set in 2029, two years after Deus Ex: Human Revolution. The Deus Ex series is set in a cyberpunk future rife with secret organizations and conspiracies, including the Illuminati. Before Human Revolution, advances in biotechnology and cybernetics led to the development of "augmentations", artificial organs capable of enhancing human performance. Augmentation requires the use of Neuropozyne, a scarce, expensive immunosuppressive drug which prevents the body from rejecting the augmentation. They also created social divides between "augs", humans who have accepted augmentation technology; and normal humans who are either morally opposed to it, too poor to afford it, or whose bodies actively reject it.

During Human Revolution, the Illuminati planned to place limitations on augmented people with a biochip. They are opposed by Adam Jensen, chief of security at the pro-augmentation corporation Sarif Industries, who is heavily augmented after an attack on his employers critically injures him. Illuminati member Hugh Darrow subverts the Illuminati's plan in order to prejudice humanity against augmentations, broadcasting a signal from the Arctic research base Panchaea which drove anyone with the biochip insane; the mass chaos is later called the Aug Incident. Jensen stops the signal, and has a choice: to broadcast stories supporting Darrow, the Illuminati or his employer, or to destroy Panchaea and let humanity decide. Regardless of the ending chosen, Panchaea is destroyed anyway due to damage suffered during the Aug Incident, but social trauma from the Aug Incident and the Illuminati's manipulation cause augmented people to be stigmatized. Humanity has imposed a "mechanical apartheid" on augmented people by Mankind Divided, isolating them in ghettos and stripping them of their rights.

The story focuses on events in Prague, with some events set in Dubai and London. Several factions play key roles in the game world. One of the most prominent is the Illuminati, a group of corporate elites which influences society for its own aims. The Illuminati are opposed by the Juggernaut Collective, a group of hacktivists led by the shadowy Janus and precursors of underground movements in the original Deus Ex. The two main factions in Mankind Divided are Task Force 29 (TF29), an Interpol-run anti-terrorist unit based in Prague; and the Augmented Rights Coalition (ARC), originally an aid group for augmented people and now a controversial militant organization opposing the abuse of the augmented.

=== Characters ===
Human Revolution protagonist Adam Jensen returns as the lead character. Presumed dead after Panchaea's destruction, he was rescued and secretly implanted with advanced augmentations. Due to a genetic trait which allows augmentations without Neuropozyne, Jensen occupies a middle ground between humans who mistrust augmented people and those whose augmentations are decaying due to a lack of Neuropozyne. Adam becomes part of TF29 as a double agent for the Juggernaut Collective to expose the Illuminati, interacting with the Collective's unseen leader Janus through Alejandra "Alex" Vega. His co-workers in TF29 are director Jim Miller and psychologist Delara Auzenne. Adam's main opponents are ARC leader Talos Rucker and Viktor Marchenko, a member of ARC who becomes a terrorist. Central characters in the downloadable content (DLC) episodes are Frank Pritchard, an old associate from Sarif Industries; Shadowchild, a skilled hacker with a grudge against the Palisade Bank corporation; and Hector Guerrero, an undercover agent in the "Pent House" prison for augmented criminals.

=== Plot ===
Note: While the general plot of Mankind Divided follows a distinct path, many elements are subject to the player's decisions. The game also offers subplots that the player may or may not encounter, depending on their actions within the game. This synopsis concentrates on the main, unavoidable plot thread and main choices of the game.

During a mission in Dubai for TF29, Adam and his team narrowly escape an attack by an augmented mercenary group. He returns to Prague and speaks to Vega; they are caught in a bomb attack, which damages Adam's augmentations. After repairing them and learning about the hidden augmentations planted during his recovery after Panchaea, Adam spies on a meeting between Miller and his superiors and learns that the recent attacks will be attributed to ARC by the United Nations leadership. Adam is sent by Miller to the Golem City ghetto and confronts Rucker, who dies after confirming that ARC was not responsible for the attacks. The Illuminati-aligned Marchenko takes Rucker's place, and begins steering ARC towards militancy. Adam learns that TF29 director Joseph Manderley and VersaLife CEO Bob Page—prominent Illuminati members—used Orchid, a biological weapon, to kill Rucker.

Rucker's death causes unrest in the augmented population, and the Czech authorities impose martial law. Adam learns of two opportunities to advance his investigation; a lead from Vega and Janus on Orchid data stored in a Palisade Bank vault, and a mission from TF29 to bring in augmented ex-soldier and bomb maker Allison Stanek. Through either route, Adam reaches Marchenko's base in the Swiss Alps but is captured and injected with Orchid; Adam survives because of his genetic traits. After spying on a local crime family, he learns that Marchenko is planning an attack on a London summit hosted by the highly influential Nathaniel Brown, the CEO of the construction firm Santeau Group. Brown is lobbying against the Human Restoration Act, an Illuminati-backed bill which would permanently segregate the augmented in the isolated metropolis of Rabi'ah, Oman, currently under construction by the Santeau Group and set to make a heavy loss.

In London, Brown refuses to call things off, and Marchenko's men infiltrate the summit. A number of factors now depend on Adam's past and current actions, including Miller's fate after he is poisoned with Orchid, whether Brown is saved or dies, and whether Marchenko is captured or killed before he uses bombs to destroy the surrounding apartment complex. Brown's fate and Marchenko's actions lead to the Human Restoration Act being passed or blocked. After the mission, Vega vows that the Juggernaut Collective will pursue Manderley and Page, and Adam insists that Vega introduce him to Janus. In a post-credits scene, a council of Illuminati members convenes and decides to watch Adam closely. Auzenne is revealed to be an Illuminati spy using Adam to find Janus.

The narrative is expanded with the DLC series, "Jensen's Stories". In Desperate Measures, Adam discovers that footage of the bombing was edited by a member of Tarvos Security to protect a family member. In System Rift, Adam helps Pritchard break into the Palisade's Blade vault and investigate the logistics of Rabi'ah, receiving help from Shadowchild. When Pritchard's avatar is trapped in the system, Shadowchild and Adam punch a hole in the Blade's firewall as a diversion so he can escape. In A Criminal Past, Adam talks with Auzenne about his first TF29 mission. He went undercover in the "Pent House", a maximum security prison for the augmented, when Guerrero, another TF29 operative, went dark. After contacting Guerrero and being involved in a prison riot, Adam discovers Junkyard: an augmentation-harvesting ring which uses the Fixer, an inmate. Guerrero has become affiliated with Junkyard and wants to kill the Fixer after he discovers their identities. Adam can defuse the situation or take sides (leading to different fates for Guerrero and the Fixer), asking Auzenne if she would kill to protect a mission.

== Development ==
Eidos-Montréal developed Human Revolution as a prequel of Deus Ex and a reboot of the series after several years of dormancy. Although Human Revolution was greeted with skepticism during its development, it was released in 2011 to critical and commercial success. Lead writer Mary DeMarle said that the team had no plans for a sequel during production of Human Revolution, since their primary goal was to return Deus Ex to the public eye. As development finished, the core team realized that they needed to produce a sequel. The sequel was originally to be produced by Obsidian Entertainment. Studio CEO Feargus Urquhart estimated that their version would have been released in 2014, but the plan failed to materialize due to unspecified circumstances.

Production of Mankind Divided began in 2011 after the completion of The Missing Link, an expansion of Human Revolution. The team aimed to improve and streamline the experience of Human Revolution with Mankind Divided, keeping well-received elements intact and polishing those which had been criticized at launch or left untouched due to time constraints. The sequel's production took five years, with its long development explained by DeMarle and gameplay director Patrick Fortier as due to upgraded technology and depth of narrative. In a later interview, co-writer Mark Cecere described the development as troubled due to staffing issues, and production resources being split between the single player and multiplayer portions. Production was completed on July 29, 2016, with Eidos-Montréal confirming that the game was gold (indicating that it was being prepared for duplication and release).

=== Scenario ===
According to DeMarle, the team met to discuss where to go from Human Revolution. Inspired by the Aug Incident at the end of Human Revolution, they wanted to explore its impact and aftermath. Although Human Revolution ended with a player choice, the team realized that the world's population would be too busy dealing with the tragedy to notice. This allowed the development of a sequel where each player's choice was valid. DeMarle was in charge of the narrative design, overseeing a large group of writers who were split into teams; some handled the main narrative with DeMarle, others the side quests, and others helping with elements such as dialogue trees with boss characters. One of the contributors to the scenario was James Swallow, who had previously written additional media and helped with the writing of Human Revolution and Deus Ex: The Fall.

Describing Mankind Divided's narrative design, producer Olivier Proulx said that the team wanted to redesign the narrative structure with less opportunity for players to use a save to play through several set endings (as in Human Revolution). Key plot twists were present through to the end of the game, impacting dialogue and story options. Some plot elements were left unresolved by the end of Mankind Divided, attributed by DeMarle to production time limits and problems caused by the game's narrative detail. Cecere elaborated that the ending, which focused on Marchenko, was intended as the midpoint and the game would have seen Jensen travelling to the city of Rabi'ah and focused on the true mastermind controlling Marchenko.

About where the narrative was supposed to go, Fortier said that the team wanted to evolve the first game's focus on transhumanism. This led to incorporating the theme of discrimination, apparently the logical outcome of the social divisions created by augmentations. Although the themes aligned with contemporary real-world events, Fortier said that this was primarily coincidental. These elements played into the series' cyberpunk setting and its focus on conspiracy theories. Prague was chosen because the team wanted to focus on Europe after much of Human Revolution was set in America. Prague was a good example of a city with a combination of old and new architecture. The team also chose it because of the myth of the golem (originating, according to Fleur Marty, in central Europe), reflected by the Golem City ghetto.

While creating her narrative, DeMarle needed to remember the established Deus Ex narrative. She approached it as history written by the winner, with established fact in the original Deus Ex not being accurate. This fit with the seeking of truth, a theme of Mankind Divided. Supplementary information in the game helped connect Mankind Divided to Human Revolution and future Deus Ex games. The Illuminati, key antagonists in the series, were portrayed differently in Mankind Divided than they were in the original Deus Ex, where they were part of a "'90s-era X-Files-style paranoia". DeMarle wrote them as a loosely aligned elite, where each member pursues their own goals. She compared the Illuminati of Mankind Divided with the bankers described in the book, Too Big to Fail. Both were too arrogant to unite in a common cause, and the bankers were the closest she could get to the fictional Illuminati.

An early decision brought Human Revolution protagonist Adam Jensen back for Mankind Divided. According to Proulx, his "badass" persona made him a favorite of the staff. DeMarle did not see Adam as having a long life in the Deus Ex series, and he died at the end of one of her drafts for Human Revolution. A core part of Adam's portrayal in Mankind Divided was his acceptance of his augmentations after they were forced on him. Described by game director Jean-François Dugas as "a tool and a weapon", Adam accepted his augmented status in Mankind Divided and decided to use it for the greater good and his personal goals. Although Human Revolution portrayed Adam as reactive, in Mankind Divided DeMarle insisted that he be rewritten as proactive. His interactions with Miller had to take into account Adam's reworked persona and the necessities of a mission-based game. Elias Toufexis returned to voice Adam, and was called in to begin recording in 2013. About returning to the role, Toufexis described it as easy since he knew Adam's character better; it was still difficult, however, since Adam's personality was defined by the player. Toufexis needed to have several versions of Adam in memory, so he could change his voice accordingly.

=== Game design ===
Discussing the game design of Mankind Divided, director Jean-François Dugas said that although their first game was characterized by their overall "naiveté", Mankind Divided required courage to bring Deus Ex gameplay to "the next level". They had a solid base with Human Revolution, but the team wanted to evolve from that base and address problems raised by players and critics. Issues included balance problems, stiff mechanics, weak combat and boss fights which seemed to penalize a non-lethal playing style. Some of these problems were resolved in the Human Revolution director's cut, and feedback from that enabled the team to further tailor and balance the design of Mankind Divided. The gameplay had to reflect the narrative surrounding Jensen's acceptance of his augmentations.

The team focused on creating an immersive environment and opportunities for player choice (from non-linear exploration to primitively completing objectives) on a large and small scale. The Praxis upgrade system was carried over from Human Revolution, and weapons were based on their real-life counterparts. The AI system was upgraded, with two different subsystems for open combat and stealth which would react differently and transition smoothly in response to player actions. Augmentations were based on telemetry from Human Revolution which indicated what was popular with players. The team evaluated boss battles in the context of Mankind Divided, including classic bosses who needed to be fought and encounters which could be navigated verbally. Although Fortier did not want classic boss battles, he realized that the game's mechanical limitations necessitated them. In response to complaints about the outsourced boss battles in Human Revolution, those in Mankind Divided were developed in-house; every boss was navigable with conversation or non-lethal options.

Breach mode originated when the team wanted to diverge from the main game's realism. A "live" team, led by Fleur Marty, created Breach to bring Mankind Divided's mechanics into a non-realistic setting. Although the team wanted to experiment with a multiplayer mode, it would be difficult to implement and explain in the Deus Ex setting and they decided on an asynchronous system. They implemented elements which encouraged fast completion. Early builds had a more difficult path back to each level's exit, which was changed due to its negative impact on stealth-based gameplay. The team included microtransactions, but Marty said in an interview that players were not required to pay anything. Their aim was to make Breach "lighter than Hearthstone": a mode which was part of a retail game rather than a free-to-play, standalone mode.

=== Technology ===
Mankind Divided runs on the Dawn Engine, a game engine designed for eighth-generation gaming hardware. It was built on Glacier 2, an in-house engine created by IO Interactive. The team had several choices of engine technology after Human Revolution. They included the Unreal Engine, used by another team in the company to develop the 2014 Thief reboot; the CDC engine, created by Crystal Dynamics for Tomb Raider: Underworld and its upcoming 2013 series reboot, and the IO Interactive Glacier 2 engine used by Hitman: Absolution. Due to its more-extensive tool suite, Eidos-Montréal chose Glacier 2 and expanded its basic framework to create the Dawn Engine. The team introduced physically-based rendering as part of the redesign, and the engine was optimized for the game's narrative base.

Creating the environments was a challenge for the developers, who wanted to be as realistic as possible within the game's planned design and available technology. The characters' hair, designed to appear as lifelike as possible, was animated with in-house technology based on TressFX. Dedicated lighting programming allowed realism in changing light conditions. Environmental scale was troublesome; interior rooms with realistic proportions and high detail were too large to fit in their exterior structures, and the team used programming tricks to maintain the illusion of reality. Multiple lighting filters were created at different levels to achieve a dynamic, realistic lighting system, and the game's use of light dovetailed with its artistic themes. Due to a lack of console-specific functions, in-house technology was used for the anti-aliasing filters to maintain a smooth image when navigating its environments.

An element of the original Glacier 2 engine which was carried over into the Dawn Engine was the "entity system", an advanced AI system which allowed the quick creation of new AI behavior based on existing designs. This eliminated the need for a dedicated AI programmer. The advantage of Dawn Engine technology was its ability to hold a large number of entities at one time, which was suited to large game environments. Its "entity-driven" architecture allowed artists deep involvement with the environment and level-design teams. The more-powerful technology allowed the inclusion of more interactive and environmental objects and elements central to the Deus Ex series, such as air ducts and cover. The team wanted to avoid obvious walls preventing the player from moving beyond the map boundaries, so they integrated areas into the environment and looped major streets to create an illusion of size.

=== Art design ===
Martin Dubeau was Mankind Divided's art director, and Human Revolution art director Jonathan Jacques-Belletête remained as executive art director. Like Human Revolution, Renaissance and Baroque artists (including Johannes Vermeer, Rembrandt and Leonardo da Vinci) provided design inspirations for the team. Humanity's attitude to augmentation was described as a metaphorical and overt expression of the transition between the Dark Ages and the Age of Enlightenment, with gold remaining a symbolic representation of pro-augmentation factions. Black and gold were the dominant colors for Human Revolution, but Mankind Divided made less use of these colors due to its narrative; instead, it used blue and gray to create a subdued setting. Its game world aimed to make locations recognizable while adding futuristic, cyberpunk elements, since the game was set in the near future. Dubeau represented the more-subdued tone and violent reaction against augmentations by using "cold, raw, and opaque materials" for modern architecture. Golem City, Prague's ghetto for augmented citizens, was based on Kowloon Walled City and corporate housing; for Dubai, the team was inspired by the work of Zaha Hadid.

Adam's outfit was changed, referring to his first appearance in Human Revolution and his evolution after that game. Although Jacques-Belletête was satisfied with the first game's design, Dubeau wanted to use it as the starting point for a new design. After working on it internally for some time, the art team decided to collaborate with an external partner. They contacted Errolson Hugh, co-founder of the Berlin-based design house Acronym, to design Adam's coat. His new outfit aimed at a military feel while incorporating stylistic elements from its earlier form, fashion elements common to Hugh's work, and practical fastenings and alterations to accommodate Adam's augmentations. Marchenko's design reflected a life of work and hardship. The character of Rucker was designed as symbolic of his own hardships and his position in ARC. His death scene included a sunset which, according to Dubeau, represented the death of the cyber-Renaissance. Police-officer designs reflected the theme of regression, and their body armor was modeled on medieval knights. In addition to Adam's coat, Hugh and Acronym collaborated on the game's general clothing design. Its costume design was inspired by the work of fashion designer Gareth Pugh.

=== Music ===
Human Revolution composer Michael McCann returned as a co-composer for Mankind Divided. McCann was joined by Sascha Dikiciyan, whose work included Borderlands and Tron: Evolution. According to audio director Steve Szczepkowski, the team wanted to build on Human Revolution's musical foundation while communicating the darker themes of Mankind Divided; due to the game's scale, another composer was sought to join McCann. After hearing Dikiciyan's music, Szczepkowski talked with him about joining the team; Dikiciyan shared his enthusiasm for the series, and came on board. Breach-mode music was composed by Ed Harrison, and the game's ending theme was composed by Misha Mansoor of the progressive metal band Periphery. Two soundtrack albums for Mankind Divided were released on December 2, 2016: a standard edition and an extended edition, with additional tracks.

== Release ==
Mankind Divided was confirmed in a 2013 press release from Eidos-Montréal about the Deus Ex series as part of a series-wide project, the "Deus Ex Universe", with future games and additional media designed to expand on the series' setting. The game was leaked a day before its official announcement, in early April 2015, for PlayStation 4, Xbox One and Microsoft Windows personal computers (PC). It was the culmination of the three-day "Can't Kill Progress" promotional event, organised by Eidos-Montréal and publisher Square Enix, which featured a live Twitch stream of a man pacing, sleeping and meditating in a nondescript room. Viewers could change the camera angle and vote on how the man should act during his interrogation. The campaign, inspired by Deus Ex' choice-based narrative and gameplay, intended to alert fans that the series had returned.

The trailer was produced by Visual Works, Square Enix' CGI department. Visual Works had been involved with Deus Ex and Eidos-Montréal since Square Enix acquired the series' previous owner, Eidos Interactive, in 2009. Adam's character model was based on original CGI models from Human Revolution and Eidos-Montréal's design documents. Eidos-Montréal collaborated with Visual Works on the trailer's aesthetic design and content. Although their previous projects had settings based on European fantasy or advanced science-fiction futures, the team used the real-world Prague for the bombing scenes. Action scenes were worked out in advance with the motion-capture actors. The most difficult scene for Visual Works was where Adam activated the Titan Armor augmentation to block a hail of bullets.

The PC version was created by Nixxes Software and Advanced Micro Devices (AMD), who focused on the control scheme and graphics options for different computer systems. Nixxes and AMD enabled the game to perform smoothly on DirectX 12 systems. The DirectX 12 system included a new application programming interface which was similar to that used for the console versions, allowing equivalent optimization and exchange of technological improvements. A priority for the PC version's graphics was improving bokeh and depth of field to create a more-realistic environment. The effects were implemented with AOFX, part of AMD's GPUOpen middleware tool. Another enhancement was to the TressFX hair effect, which was altered so much by AMD that it was designated a new graphics tool called PureHair.

Mankind Divided was originally scheduled for release on February 23, 2016. In November 2015, however, the team announced that its release would be delayed until August 23, exactly five years to the day Human Revolution was released. According to Eidos-Montréal, when the team had a fully playable version it needed extra time to polish the game to player-standard quality. The game was released in standard and digital-deluxe editions, which included access to DLC and in-game items such as Praxis Kits. As a pre-order bonus for the PC version, an announcer pack featuring Adam's voice was released for the Dota 2 multiplayer online battle arena game. A port for Linux and macOS were developed and published by Feral Interactive. The Linux port was released on November 3, 2016, and the macOS version on December 12, 2017. It was also released in standard and digital-deluxe editions, with in-game items and DLC.

=== Controversy ===
Shortly after the game was announced, Mankind Divided was criticized online for using the word "apartheid" as part of its marketing. The criticism stemmed from the word's historic association with apartheid, a system of racial segregation in South Africa for much of the 20th century. Members of the game's staff advocated their use of the term due to its relevance to the story's subject matter. Additional controversy arose among the public and other game developers for Mankind Divided's use of the phrase "Aug Lives Matter" in its promotional concept art. The slogan is very similar to Black Lives Matter, an activist movement. According to the developers, the similarity was a coincidence and its choice predated the movement's emergence in 2013.

An original marketing campaign for Mankind Divided revolved around a five-tier pre-order campaign; players who had pre-ordered the game could pick items from each tier (each with their own pre-order bonuses) depending on worldwide pre-orders. The highest tier would have allowed players access to the game four days before its release date. According to Square Enix, the system was intended to offer more freedom to players about pre-order content rather than developers choosing pre-order content packages for release in each region. Game journalists and fans were highly critical of the campaign. Due to the negative reaction, the system was canceled and all content was available to those who pre-ordered the game or purchased a Day 1 edition. Mankind Divided was criticized after release for its use of microtransactions, compounded by rumors about internal troubles with the game's development.

=== Post-release content ===
After the game's release, the development team focused on post-release content and DLC ranging from story-based episodes to updates of Breach. A free, standalone version of Breach was released on Steam on January 24, 2017; Deus Ex: Mankind Divided – VR Experience, a non-interactive virtual reality tour of four environments in Mankind Divided, was released the same day. Access to the DLC was by separate purchase and as part of the season pass which was part of the deluxe edition.

The story DLC was released under the umbrella title of "Jensen's Stories". Desperate Measures, a brief mission which was set after the main game's events, was released as a pre-order bonus before becoming available as a free download in January 2017. The next DLC, System Rift, was released on September 23, 2016, one month after the game's release. In addition to a new location to explore, System Rift's narrative explained the Breach mode. The final DLC expansion, A Criminal Past, was released on February 23, 2017.

=== Related media ===
A five-issue comic titled Deus Ex Universe: Children's Crusade was issued by the comic branch of Titan Books between February and July 2016. The comic was written by Alexander C. Irvine and drawn by John Aggs. The comics were collected together and released as a single volume on August 30. A spin-off novel written by Swallow, Deus Ex: Black Light, was published by Titan Books on August 23, 2016. According to Swallow, Black Light fills in some of the story gaps between Human Revolution and Mankind Divided, concluding with his acceptance of work with TF29. Black Light was one of several possibilities of filling the story gap, with other options being a comic series or online animated series. In addition to these, Swallow wrote a novella called Deus Ex: Hard Line featuring Alex Vega, and Irvine and Aggs collaborated on a mini-comic called Deus Ex Universe: The Dawning Darkness. Initially pre-order exclusive, Hard Line and The Dawning Darkness were released as free downloads.

== Reception ==
Reception

Aggregate score
Aggregator	Score
Metacritic	(PC) 83/100 (PS4) 84/100 (XONE) 83/100

Review scores
Publication	Score
Electronic Gaming Monthly	8.5/10
Eurogamer	Recommended
Game Informer	7/10
GameRevolution	4/5
GameSpot	8/10
GamesRadar+	4.5/5
IGN	9.2/10
PC Gamer (US)	88/100
Polygon	8.5/10

Deus Ex: Mankind Divided received "generally favorable" reviews from critics, according to review aggregator website Metacritic. The PlayStation 4 versions of System Rift and A Criminal Past likewise received "generally favorable" reviews, but the PC version for the latter DLC received "mixed or average" reviews.

Nick Plessas of Electronic Gaming Monthly enjoyed the narrative's enclosed nature and how the game gave Adam personality while keeping him an enigma for players. Eurogamer's Edwin Evans-Thirlwell found its story structure among the best in the game's genre, but Andrew Reiner of Game Informer felt that Mankind Divided sacrificed the narrative's potential to address its themes. Nicholas Tan, writing for Game Revolution, said the narrative was "successful is in its ability to juggle and weave multiple complex and modern themes together". GameSpot's Edmond Tran enjoyed the game's tone and narrative, but thought that some players might find it overly complex. Phil Savage of GamesRadar praised the conspiracy narrative carried over from Human Revolution, but felt that it left the game's main narrative and characters underdeveloped. IGN's Vince Ingenito called the plot "well produced", but Andy Kelly of PC Gamer found the side-mission stories more interesting than the main narrative. Polygon's Arthur Gies called the environmental storytelling and its side missions the game's greatest strengths. A number of reviewers criticized the brevity of Mankind Divided's campaign and problems with the writing of its characters and main narrative. The game's handling of its themes was criticized, particularly in contrast to its pre-release controversy.

Reiner was positive about the visuals and music, but called the voice acting "hit or miss". Tan also praised the game's graphics, and Tran enjoyed exploring the environments of Prague due to their design and the combination of realistic and futuristic architecture. Savage found the setting superior to that of Human Revolution, noting some poor facial animations for minor characters. Ingenito also noted inconsistent facial animations, but said that Prague was "gorgeously realized". Kelly praised the graphics and called the level design "brilliant", and Gies enjoyed Prague's seamless nature compared to other contemporary games.

Plessas was generally positive about the upgrade systems and balance, but found the AI deficient. Noting the game's emphasis on stealth and hacking, Evans-Thirlwell enjoyed the freedom for players to approach missions as desired. Reiner found the action-based approach less appealing due to the AI and dull implementation, but enjoyed the stealth mechanics and associated augmentations. Tan praised the expanded options for players, noting that hacking had been downplayed in comparison with Human Revolution. Savage called Mankind Divided "a game that's best enjoyed slowly and deliberately" due to its combination of augmentation upgrades and new customization options. Tran praised the variety of approaches to different situations and the augmentation systems and removal of boss battles, but felt that some of the new augmentations had a negligible impact. Ingenito positively noted the improvements to combat and the UI compared to Human Revolution, and praised the new additions such as gun customization. Kelly called Mankind Divided "a great immersive sim with some of the best level design in the series", praising the gameplay variety and additional augmentation options. Gies also enjoyed the variety of gameplay options, but noted its subtle push towards a stealthy, non-lethal approach contradicting its core concept of choice. The Breach mode was generally praised.

=== Sales ===
In the United Kingdom, Mankind Divided topped the retail sales charts during its week of release, but had a weaker debut than Human Revolution because of a lower install base on consoles than its predecessor. In the United States, it was the third best-selling game of August 2016, with console games sales increases for the period partially attributed to its release. In Square Enix's 2016 fiscal report, Mankind Divided and other 2016 titles including Final Fantasy XV were cited as factors in their net-profit increase. By May 2022, Human Revolution (including the Director's cut) and Mankind Divided had sold a combined 12 million units.

=== Accolades ===
Year	Award	Category	Result	Ref.
2016	Canadian Videogame Awards 2016	Best Console Game	Won	
2016	Canadian Videogame Awards 2016	Best Game Design	Won	
2016	Canadian Videogame Awards 2016	Best Narrative	Won	
2016	Canadian Videogame Awards 2016	Best Performance	Won	
2016	Canadian Videogame Awards 2016	Game of the Year	Won	
2016	The Game Awards 2016	Best Role Playing Game	Nominated	
2016	NAVGTR	Innovation in Game Technology	Nominated	
2017	ACTRA	Outstanding Performance in a Videogame — Victoria Sanchez	Won	
2017	ACTRA	Outstanding Performance in a Videogame — Chimwemwe Miller	Nominated	
2017	ACTRA	Outstanding Performance in a Videogame — Claudia Besso	Nominated	
2017	20th Annual D.I.C.E. Awards	Role-Playing/Massively Multiplayer Game of the Year	Nominated	

== Future ==
After the release of Mankind Divided, rumors began circulating that a prospective sequel had been cancelled and Square Enix had put the Deus Ex series on hold because of disappointing sales. The rumors were compounded after Eidos-Montréal shifted to work on Shadow of the Tomb Raider and an untitled, licensed game based on the comic properties of Marvel Entertainment, later revealed to be Marvel's Guardians of the Galaxy. Later in 2017 and 2018, Square Enix and Eidos-Montréal denied rumors that the series was cancelled. Although Eidos-Montréal was not working on another Deus Ex title because of its other projects, it would return to the Deus Ex franchise when it had the available staff and the inclination.

On May 2, 2022, Square Enix sold Eidos-Montreal, the developer of Deus Ex, to Sweden's Embracer Group. On May 20, 2022, before acquisition, Embracer Group expressed an interest in developing sequels, spin-offs, remakes, and remasters in the Deus Ex franchise.

In November 2022, Jason Schreier of Bloomberg News reported that Eidos-Montréal was in the "very very early" development stages of a new Deus Ex game. In January 2024, he reported that Embracer Group had cancelled this game, which had been in development for two years. Cecere stated that their original story plan was for Jensen to unintentionally trigger events that would lead to the original Deus Ex, but that the cancelled game did not follow this narrative plan.
