= Adam Jensen =

Fictional character

- Deus Ex character
- Adam Jensen in combat gear as he appears in Deus Ex: Mankind Divided (2016)
- First appearance: Deus Ex (2011 comic)
- First game: Deus Ex: Human Revolution (2011)
- Created by: Mary DeMarle
- Designed by: Jim Murray
- Voiced by: Elias Toufexis
- Motion capture: Elias Toufexis; Shawn Baichoo (Human Revolution)

Adam Jensen is a character from Deus Ex, a series of stealth action role-playing video games. He is the main protagonist and playable character of Deus Ex: Human Revolution (2011) and its sequel Mankind Divided (2016), developed by Eidos-Montréal. He also features as a character in associated media. As security chief for leading tech corporation Sarif Industries, he is crippled by a mercenary attack, prompting Sarif Industries to extensively implant him with advanced artificial organ "augmentations" without his consent. Human Revolution follows his investigation into the attack, leading him into conflict with the Illuminati secret society. In Mankind Divided, he works with the anti-terrorism group TF29 while acting as an agent for a hacktivist group opposing the Illuminati.

Jensen was created by Human Revolution's lead writer Mary DeMarle as a protagonist with a defined personality, needing to balance this with the game's choice-based narrative. His design by artist Jim Murray acted as a homage to classic cyberpunk protagonists. For Mankind Divided, his appearance and personality were modified to reflect the game's themes and tone. His coat was co-designed by German fashion designer Errolson Hugh. Across all his appearances, he is voiced by Elias Toufexis, who also provided full performance capture for Mankind Divided. The character has seen minimal commentary, with journalists commonly noting his lack of distinct personality. Academic commentary has focused on dealing with his forced augmentation.

== Appearances ==
=== Deus Ex ===
Human Revolution

Adam Jensen is introduced in Deus Ex: Human Revolution (2011)−set in the year 2027−as the Chief of Security for Detroit-based Sarif Industries, a corporation leading development on controversial artificial organs dubbed "augmentations". A former SWAT team member, Adam resigned after disobeying an order to kill a young augmented boy classified as a threat and being subsequently used as a scapegoat after the ensuing riots. During an attack on Sarif Industries by an augmented mercenary group, researcher and ex-girlfriend Megan Reed is apparently killed and he is left crippled. CEO David Sarif saves Adam's life and equips him with advanced full-body augmentations without his consent. Optional backstory elements reveal Adam to be the only surviving subject of genetic experiments by a secret group dubbing themselves the Illuminati, having been spirited away by sympathetic scientists as a child. Due to his unique genetics, he can use augmentations without requiring Neuropozyne, a scarce and expensive immunosuppressive drug.

Investigating the attack on Sarif Industries, Adam learns that the Illuminati have been orchestrating events to influence the currently-unstable world climate, controlling augmented people through both Neuropozyne and a control chip that can shut down their augmentations. Reed was working on a solution based on his DNA that would negate Neuropozyne usage, which prompted the attack. Reed is also revealed to be alive, and when Adam finds her he learns the truth about her research. Rogue Illuminati ally Hugh Darrow, the creator of augmentations, modifies the biochip to trigger mass violence and hysteria in augmented people, hoping to drive humanity away from his creation. At Darrow's polar base Panchaea, Adam shuts down the signal and is left with a choice of what truth to broadcast to the world from suggestions by different characters, or to destroy Panchaea without revealing anything. In the Human Revolution downloadable content (DLC) expansion The Missing Link, Adam is captured by private military company Belltower en route to finding Megan, ending up investigating a project related to the game's later events.

Mankind Divided

In Deus Ex: Mankind Divided (2016), Darrow's actions−now dubbed the Aug Incident−have led to worldwide discrimination against augmented people by the year 2029. Adam is presumed dead, but was rescued from the collapsing Panchaea and implanted with new advanced augmentations. By 2029, Adam works for TF29, an Interpol anti-terrorism task force based in Prague. In secret, he also works with the hactivist group Juggernaut Collective and their leader Janus against the Illuminati. While investigating a train bombing, Adam uncovers an Illuminati plot to force through the Human Restoration Act, aimed at deporting augmented people in an isolated complex and mitigating the Aug Incident's effects on society so the Illuminati can maintain control. Whether the plan is successful depends on Adam's actions. The post-credits scene reveals that TF29 psychiatrist Delara Auzenne and Illuminati leader Lucius DeBeers are using Adam to find Janus. Further adventures are detailed in the Mankind Divided DLC series "Jensen's Stories"; Adam delves into the bombing in Desperate Measures, becomes involved in a bank heist in System Rift, and tells Auzenne about his first TF29 assignment undercover in an augmented prison in A Criminal Past.

Related media

Adam is the lead in a 2011 limited comic series released prior to Human Revolution, showing his investigation into the kidnapping of Sarif's niece and the criminals' ties to his former SWAT commander. He features in two tie-ins for Mankind Divided; the comic series Children's Crusade depicting a TF29 mission against a pro-augmentation group, and the novel Black Light showing the events after he is rescued from Panchaea. Adam is also the player character in the spin-off game Deus Ex Go (2016), following him on an infiltration mission prior to Mankind Divided.

=== Other appearances ===
Square Enix, publisher of Human Revolution, created a figure of Adam for their Play Arts Kai figurine line in Japan. Clothing sets inspired by Adam's appearance in Human Revolution was released as DLC for the 2012 video games Hitman: Absolution and Sleeping Dogs, both published by Square Enix. He was included as an announcer for Dota 2 as part of a pre-order cross-promotion for Mankind Divided. Adam, along with other characters from Mankind Divided, was featured in a limited time crossover with Final Fantasy Brave Exvius in 2018.

== Creation and design ==
Adam Jensen was designed with two looks; a casual trench coat (pictured), and a "commando" style showing his augmentations.

Adam Jensen was created as the lead protagonist of Deus Ex: Human Revolution, developed by Eidos-Montréal as their debut project. Human Revolution acted as both a prequel to the original Deus Ex (2000) and a new entry point for players. Adam was created by Mary DeMarle, lead writer for Human Revolution. DeMarle described him as a medium for the game's theme of transhumanism, being forced to confront the issue through his unwilling augmentation. He was also made a security chief for Sarif Industries to show the outsized power of corporations in the game's world and offer an easy view into the augmentation issue, contrasting him against Deus Ex protagonist JC Denton who works for a military group. While much of the game's narrative was choice-driven and player-directed, Adam had a defined personality which needed to be maintained and balanced with the gameplay design. The writing team used in-game elements, including character dialogue and in-game news, to reflect the approach players took during missions. DeMarle's early script drafts ended with Adam's death, which prompted protests from staff. Explaining this initial plan, DeMarle noted there were no plans for a sequel, and she felt "tragic heroes are always the best." She reconsidered and ended the storyline on a key choice due to positive feedback on his character.

Adam's character design was a collaborative effort across the game's art team, taking two years to finalize. The team looked at multiple protagonist from cyberpunk fiction for inspiration, from Blade Runner to the original Deus Ex. Their main wishes were to incorporate sunglasses and a trench coat. Developers wanted his design to reflect the transhumanist themes, showing both "the physical and aesthetic results" of his heavy body augmentation. A notable contributing artist to Adam's design was Jim Murray. His face was unintentionally modelled on art director Jonathan Jacques-Belletete. Needing a model for a piece of art, Murray asked Jacques-Belletete to pose, with Murray incorporating elements of Jacques-Belletete's features into Adam's design. Adam's character model, with a thin face and goatee-styled facial hair, were inspired by the lead character of Don Quixote and acted as a reference to the game's Renaissance aesthetic influence. He was given a slimmer build to avoid being a "big brutish dude" in the vein of characters like Gears of War protagonist Marcus Fenix.

The initial wish to have a single design for the character caused problems, with many of the early designs being described as "extremely bad" by Jacques-Belletete. Among the early designs were a combat-focused one dubbed "douchebag Adam", and a version with flesh-colored arms codenamed "Pinocchio Adam". The initial wish was for his mechanical arms to be exposed, with the amount of visible augmentations varying during the design process. The team ultimately settled on a design that combined cyberpunk elements with the game's Renaissance aesthetics. In the final game, Jensen has two looks: his civilian trench coat, used for "urban exploration" and "social missions", and a commando suit used for infiltration missions. Having two designs was a late decision, both impacting production and solving a number of aesthetic issues with the character. While a short coat was suggested so as to avoid cliches of the cyberpunk genre, a long coat was chosen after a studio-wide vote.

For the sequel Mankind Divided, the staff wanted Adam to return, with producer Olivier Proulx attributing the popularity to the character's "badass" persona. Contrasting against his reactive actions in Human Revolution, DeMarle wanted Jensen to be proactive, though the team needed to work around the character's role as a TF29 agent and the game's mission-based structure. Adam's casual design used the version in Human Revolution as a starting point. After initial in-house drafts, the team decided to collaborate with an external designer. The coat was created in collaboration with Errolson Hugh of German design house Acronym. The coat was intended to be "complex, yet functional" while retaining a distinct aesthetic. Acronym were given design material from Human Revolution to inform their designs, with a real-world model being created to test the coat's real-world functionality, and a Renaissance-style pattern put in the lining to reference the first game's designs. Adam's combat suit was also adjusted while retaining the same basic design. It was intended to have a more military style, reflecting his current profession. Both games contained references to the myth of Icarus, with Adam taking on parts of that symbolism.

Jensen was intended to return in a third Deus Ex title. According to writer Mark Cecere, as the Illuminati would persist by necessity until the original Deus Ex, the team wanted to answer the question of what Jensen could have done in the face of that. There was a planned Illuminati member about whom Jensen could have "done something", but his actions would have led to the events of Deus Ex and tied into the actions of original antagonist Bob Page. Cecere ultimately described Jensen's intended role as a tragic one. A third game was in development, but did not involve Jensen or the original creative staff, and was quietly cancelled in 2024.

=== Portrayal ===
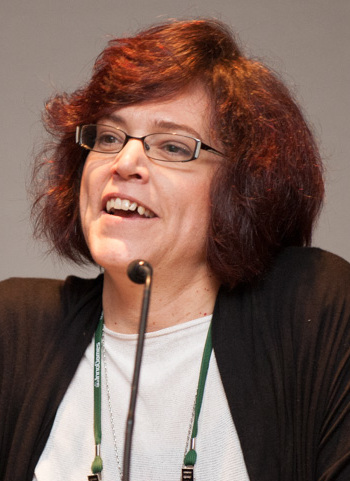
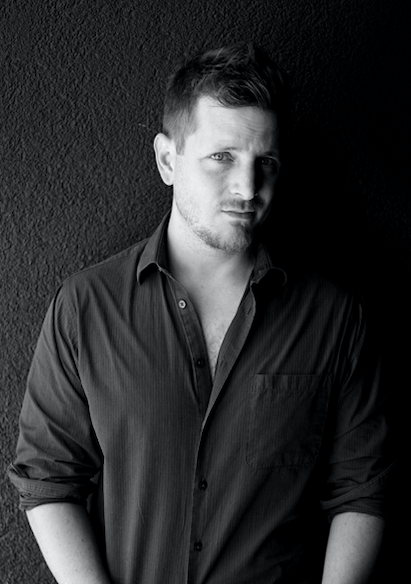
Adam Jensen was given a distinct personality by lead writer Mary DeMarle (left, pictured 2012). Canadian actor Elias Toufexis (right, pictured 2019) voices Adam, and has called the role a personal favourite.

DeMarle described Adam as being driven by forms of love and loyalty to his colleagues and friends, with his main drive in Human Revolution being making up for his mistakes rather than revenge. The game's director Jean-François Dugas describe Adam's hostile manner as "not mad or really angry", but unhappy at having augmentations forced on him, working to make sure he is not denied choice again. His views on augmentation in Human Revolution are described as ambivalent, with his uncertainty about the future and his own situation reflecting the player's perspective during the game's opening. DeMarle recalled that a journalist classified Jensen as a potential sociopath based on context clues and available in-game actions in Human Revolution, something she never intended. In Mankind Divided, Adam is portrayed as having embraced his new nature as a living weapon, with his acceptance of this reflected in both his manner and the in-game mechanics. Due to his lack of side-effects from augmentation, he also stands in a unique middle ground between augmented people and the rest of the population.

Across his voiced appearances, Adam is voiced by Canadian actor Elias Toufexis. Principally working in film and television with limited video game credits, Toufexis was surprised and pleased when he got a lead role. When he was auditioning, Adam was described to him as "kind of a Clint Eastwood character". Adam's distinctive voice is close to Toufexis's own, using a lower monotone style to both allow easy player identification and as a homage to Deus Ex protagonist JC Denton. He recalled that using his own voice for Adam was partially responsible for him losing the role of Far Cry 3 protagonist Jason Brody after Human Revolution was released.

A challenge playing Adam was performing lines differently depending on potential player choice. One line where Jensen coldly describes Megan's presumed killing shocked him. DeMarle pushed back against Toufexis during some sessions where he performed based on his interpretation rather than the script directions. While he had to vary Adam's tone for different choices and conversation-based confrontations with other characters, for the main story path he was able to use his own interpretation of the character. Another memorable scene was the late-game confrontation between Jensen and Megan, who was played by Toufexis's wife Michelle Boback. The two had been arguing the day of recording, causing the two characters' argument to sound very realistic. A line he regretted not rerecording was one of his earliest sequences when he was still finding Adam's voice, a confrontation with a former SWAT member. Comparing this early result to a poor "Bronx accent", he was upset that it remained in the final game.

Returning to voice the character for Mankind Divided, Toufexis described it as easy since he knew Adam's character better. His main difficulty was the player-tailored portrayal in-game. Toufexis needed to have several versions of the character in memory, so he could change his voice accordingly. While he had limited contact with staff during Human Revolution, for Mankind Divided he was able to be more involved across the production team so he could refine Jensen's character and movements. The writing team members under DeMarle would come to him and ask his opinion on proposed scenes, allowing Toufexis to portray Adam as a more relaxed character. Speaking in the wake of the third Deus Ex title's cancellation, Toufexis stated he had not been asked to reprise his role, and that Jensen's story seemed to have finished with Mankind Divided.

While Toufexis did some basic facial motion capture for Human Revolution, he was unable to do full performance capture due to budgetary limitations around adjusting his height to match Adam's. The character's combat takedowns were choreographed and motion captured by Shawn Baichoo. For Mankind Divided, Toufexis was able to portray Jensen through full performance capture, allowing him to better match his voice performance to the cutscenes. Performance capture for Mankind Divided was relatively easy due to his voice and general build matching Adam's. Toufexis has called Adam one of his favorite roles. When Human Revolution and Mankind Divided released in Japan, Adam was dubbed by Hiroki Yasumoto.

== Reception ==
Adam Jensen has seen little journalistic commentary, with reactions to his original appearance being unfavorable. In his review of Human Revolution, Game Informer's Andrew Reiner commented that Adam "radiates boredom", negatively comparing his personality to Neo from The Matrix franchise, and criticised the voice acting for a lack of emotion in average conversation. Reviewing the later Director's Cut version, Danielle Riendeau of Polygon said that "Jensen's guarded persona comes across more wooden than wounded", causing the game to lack a strong protagonist.

Later assessments were more positive. Issy van der Velde of NME, writing in 2021, hailed Adam as one of the best-realised cyborg characters in recent fiction due to the game's focus on his opening disempowerment and struggles with unwilling augmentation. In his review of Mankind Divided, Sam Watcher of RPGamer said that he "became smitten" with Adam and his mission during the events of Human Revolution, and praised Toufexis's continued performance. Electronic Gaming Monthly's Nick Plessas felt that his distinct personality supports the player-driven narrative of Mankind Divided without him becoming a blank slate, describing him as a "real, sympathetic individual" with his own struggles outside the game's events.

In her 2013 essay "Bodies, augmentation and disability in Dead Space and Deus Ex: Human Revolution", Diane Carr highlighted Jensen's role as a disabled protagonist confronting preconceptions felt by others surrounding augmentation technology. She also noted that the final choice and narrations ending the game took Jensen out of the internal narrative and had him "narrate privileged (i.e. external) insight into four possible futures" directly to the player. Philip Matthew Trad, writing for the 2015 book Apocalyptic Projections: A Study of Past Predictions, Current Trends and Future Intimations as Related to Film and Literature, analysed the game's themes surrounding Jensen's mission and interactions. He saw a recurring theme of Jensen struggling to maintain his humanity given his highly augmented state, with his ability to carry on without succumbing to their psychological side effects showing him as a stronger character than equivalent allied or antagonistic augmented soldiers. While noting Jensen as one of many complex cyberpunk video game protagonists, Pawel Frelik in the 2019 book The Routledge Companion to Cyberpunk Culture felt he continued a trend of lack of diversity in the genre and a continuance of the Caucasian-focused "American hero myth".

== See also ==
- Transhumanism in fiction
