= Deus Ex =

Video game series

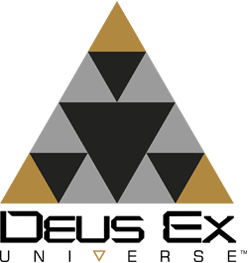
- Logo for the Deus Ex Universe
- Genres: Action role-playing, first-person shooter, stealth
- Developers: Ion Storm (2000–2003); Eidos-Montréal (2011–2017)
- Publishers: Eidos Interactive (2000–2003); Square Enix (2011–2017)
- Creator: Warren Spector
- Platforms: Android; iOS; Classic Mac OS; Linux; Microsoft Windows; macOS; Nintendo Switch; PlayStation 2; PlayStation 3; PlayStation 4; PlayStation 5; Wii U; Xbox; Xbox 360; Xbox One; Xbox Series X/S
- First release: Deus Ex; June 23, 2000
- Latest release: Deus Ex: Mankind Divided – VR Experience; January 24, 2017

Deus Ex is a series of action role-playing video games, originally developed by Ion Storm (2000-2003) and later Eidos-Montréal (2011-2017). The series began with the titular first game published by Eidos Interactive in 2000, and continued in three further mainline entries, and multiple spin-off titles. The gameplay combines first-person shooter, stealth, and role-playing elements, and has levels which offer multiple solutions to problems. A recurring feature is augmentations, mechanical or nanotechnological artificial organs which the protagonists use in their quests and impact gameplay styles. Set in a science fiction cyberpunk future, the series follows characters investigating mysteries tied to conspiracy theories and organizations including the Illuminati. Recurring themes across the series include transhumanism, terrorism, and discrimination.

The original game was created by Warren Spector, who wrote the original design document and created the initial setting inspired by multiple pieces of science fiction and political fiction. Ion Storm developed a sequel, Invisible War (2003), and attempted to make a third entry before closing down in 2005. The series was restarted by Eidos-Montréal in 2007, with the prequel Human Revolution (2011). The success of Human Revolution prompted a series revival, with a 2016 sequel and multiple spin-offs under then-publisher Square Enix.

The series as a whole has been praised for its gameplay design and setting, with some journalists citing the original Deus Ex as a prominent example of the "immersive sim", a category also attached to other series entries. Individual games have seen varying contemporary and retrospective reception. Beginning with Human Revolution, the series has seen multimedia expansions into comics and novels, many released as part of a project dubbed the "Deus Ex Universe".

== Games ==
Release timeline
2000	Deus Ex
2001–2002
2003	Deus Ex: Invisible War
2004–2010
2011	Deus Ex: Human Revolution
2012–2015
2016	Deus Ex: Mankind Divided

- Deus Ex was released in 2000 for Microsoft Windows, and received later ports to Mac OS that year, and PlayStation 2 in 2002. Taking place during a worldwide pandemic, the story follows cybernetically enhanced secret agent JC Denton as he uncovers a conspiracy tied to the pandemic and his own employers.
- Deus Ex: Invisible War, a direct sequel to the original, was released in 2003 for Windows and Xbox. Set 20 years after the first game, the story follows the actions of Alex D, an augmented corporate agent who becomes involved in efforts to reshape and control the world following the events of the first game.
- Deus Ex: Human Revolution, a prequel to the original game, was released in 2011 for Windows, PlayStation 3 and Xbox 360. A downloadable content (DLC) expansion The Missing Link released that same year, an OS X port released in 2012, and a complete version was released in 2013 for the Wii U and its original platforms which included all previous DLC. Set in 2027 during a period of social change, the plot follows SWAT member-turned-security chief Adam Jensen as he investigates an attack on his company by augmented mercenaries tied to a wider conspiracy.
- Deus Ex: Mankind Divided, a direct sequel to Human Revolution, was released in 2016 for Windows, PlayStation 4 and Xbox One. Versions for other operating systems were released in 2016 and 2017. It was supported into 2017 with a series of DLC scenarios dubbed "Jensen's Stories". Set in 2029, Jensen continues to investigate conspiracy figureheads while working for Interpol as an agent during a time of discrimination against augmented people.

=== Spin-offs and related media ===
A mobile spin-off set within the timeline of Human Revolution, Deus Ex: The Fall, was developed by N-Fusion Interactive and published in 2013 for mobile devices and 2014 for Windows. A sequel to The Fall was planned, but never entered production and left its story incomplete. A puzzle game for mobile platforms, Deus Ex Go, was developed by Square Enix Montreal and released in 2016. Two products related to Mankind Divided released in 2017; Breach, a standalone version of the game's multiplayer element, and a non-interactive virtual reality experience exploring some of the game environments.

Human Revolution had multiple media expansions released around it, expanding on its world and characters; these included a prequel comic series, and two prequel novels. Following Human Revolution, future entries and related media within the Deus Ex series was grouped under an umbrella project dubbed the "Deus Ex Universe". Mankind Divided also had several comics and a spin-off novel that filled in the narrative following Human Revolution.

== Common elements ==
=== Gameplay ===
A gameplay screenshot from Deus Ex: Invisible War; the series has maintained similar gameplay with minor changes to its design and complexity.

All entries in the Deus Ex series are action role-playing video games which combine first-person shooter, stealth, and role-playing elements. The initial design of Deus Ex was inspired by multiple contemporary titles including Half-Life, Fallout, Thief: The Dark Project, and GoldenEye 007. The concept was for a "genre-busting" title which combined elements of different genres into a single title. The gameplay style has remained generally consistent, with later entries simplifying for ease of play, or adjusting and expanding elements including perspective and ability usage. The series has been grouped into the category of "immersive sim", a type of game associated with player freedom and realistic world design.

The games are played primarily from a first-person perspective, with games after Human Revolution featuring contextual switches to a third-person view. The original core concept for the gameplay of Deus Ex was for the player to have great freedom for completing objectives and progressing the game, and in later entries freedom of choice has remained an important element. Players take on the role of the player character while exploring hub areas which contain main and side quests, and objectives which encourage a number of different gameplay approaches, lethal and non-lethal combat options, and multiple possible story outcomes. Hacking into devices such as computers and locks is a recurring feature across the series. Individual entries have unique gameplay elements such as the universal ammunition in Invisible War, and the multiplayer Breach mode in Mankind Divided.

A recurring story and gameplay feature across the series is "Augmentations", artificial organs which use either machinery or nanotechnology; these augmentations range from permanent features such as radio links, to optional abilities including cloaking, hacking features, and different combat-focused elements. The original Deus Ex uses both augmentations, and a skill point system which dictates further character proficiencies. Invisible War ties augmentations to different categories which are unlocked and upgraded with items called Biomods. Augmentations from Human Revolution onwards are unlocked using items called Praxis Kits, which can be bought with in-game currency, awarded for completing quests, or unlocked by gathering experience points. Human Revolution had augmentations geared more towards action or stealth-based approaches, with Mankind Divided adjusting augmentations to be viable across more playstyles.

=== Setting and narrative ===
The Deus Ex series is set in a cyberpunk version of the 21st Century; the series chronology spans from the 2020s to the 2070s. The stories of each title follow an augmented lead character investigating a mystery which leads into wider conspiracies, with their in-game actions and final choices leading to multiple endings. A recurring antagonistic faction is a fictionalized version of the Illuminati. While in earlier titles the Illuminati are portrayed as an old and powerful secret society controlling global affairs, in Human Revolution and its related titles they are portrayed as and compared to a loosely-aligned group of corporate elites.

The original Deus Ex takes place in 2052, a period where the world is on the brink of social and economic collapse through environmental factors and growing corporate power. During Invisible War in 2072, following a period of global war dubbed the "Collapse", people live in isolated city states and multiple organizations are vying for control. Titles following Human Revolution are set in the 2020s, during and after a period of technological and social change dubbed the "Cyber Renaissance". A key plot point of Human Revolution is the growing division between those who use Augmentations, and those who either will not use them or are unable to. An influential event during Human Revolution is a violent mass psychosis of augmented people orchestrated by the game's antagonists; dubbed the "Aug Incident", by the events of Mankind Divided this has led to widespread discrimination of the augmented.

A recurring element of the series from its inception was that multiple conspiracy theories were real events and groups that influenced the world. This aspect of the original was directly influenced by popular culture of the late 1990s to 2000s. A theme introduced in Invisible War was the nature of terrorism, and what circumstances led people to be classified as terrorists. For Human Revolution and its related titles, a core theme is transhumanism, primarily explored through protagonist Adam Jensen after he is heavily augmented against his wishes. Human Revolution also focused on the growing power of megacorporations, mirroring then-contemporary concerns. Mankind Divided also incorporated the theme of discrimination, which was described as a logical end point of the social separation created by augmentation usage.

== History and development ==
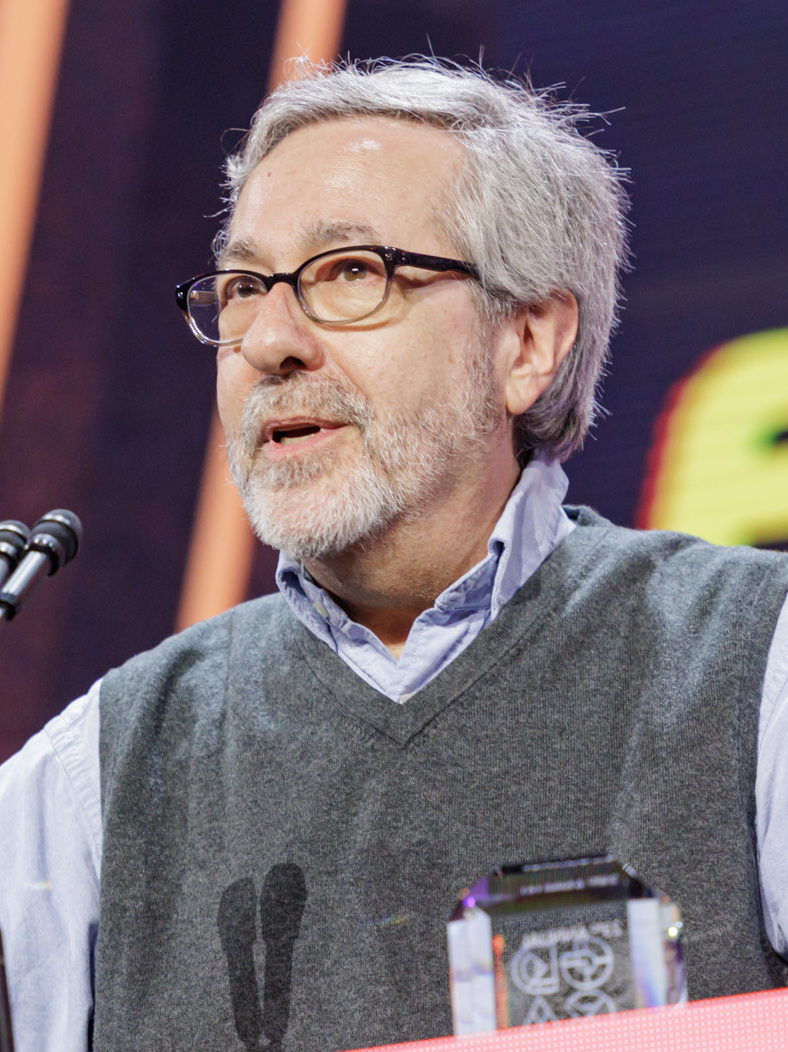
Warren Spector

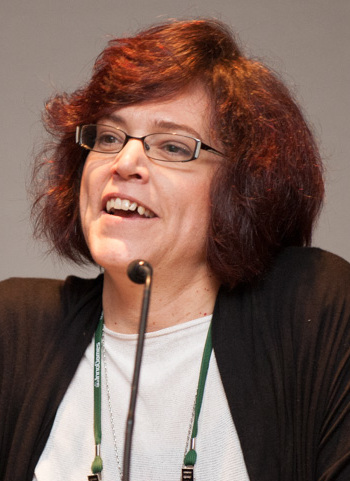
Mary DeMarle

The Deus Ex series has been handled by multiple staff; Spector (left) created the original game's concept and acted as a producer and director, and DeMarle (right) was lead writer for Human Revolution and Mankind Divided.

The original concept for Deus Ex was created by Warren Spector under the name "Troubleshooter". Inspired by his wife's liking of The X-Files, and drawing inspiration from both the work of cyberpunk writer Bruce Sterling and his game design ambitions, Spector created the concept for a realistic role-playing title set in a conspiracy-ridden future. Due to lack of interest from his then-employers, Spector's pitch went unused until he was approached by John Romero to lead the Austin-based branch of new developer Ion Storm and work on a project with complete creative freedom. Deus Ex began production in 1997 under the title Shooter: Majestic Revelations. Among the staff were Spector's old colleague Harvey Smith as lead designer, and Sheldon Pacotti as lead writer. Eidos Interactive funded and published the game, seeking to diversify their portfolio. There were production issues born from the scale of the project, conflicts between different groups within the staff, and morale issues caused by negative publicity around Ion Storm's Dallas studio. To make release, several planned areas and gameplay concepts ended up being cut.

Following the first game's release and success production began on the sequel Invisible War, with the goal being to create a more mainstream version of the first game's design and increase the amount of choices given to players. Smith took over as director, and Pacotti returned as lead writer, with Spector taking on a supervisory role. Spector later called the changes made with Invisible War as a decision based around the need to make the game more profitable, aiming at players outside the original's niche audience. Spector later faulted the amount of feedback the team listened too much to early focus testers, which influenced the game's more science fiction-like setting and toned-down gameplay elements.

Following Invisible War, Ion Storm made multiple attempts to produce a third Deus Ex title before their closure. The two major projects were a title that would use the same engine as Invisible War while refining its mechanics, and an open world-styled sequel. A spin-off called Deus Ex: Clan Wars was being co-produced with Crystal Dynamics, but it was ultimately distanced from the series and rebranded as Project Snowblind (2005). Invisible War was the last Deus Ex produced by Ion Storm, which closed down in 2005 following the release of Thief: Deadly Shadows.

A new Deus Ex game began development in 2007 at the newly-formed Eidos-Montréal; the game would eventually be titled Human Revolution. Many of the staff were veterans of Ubisoft Montreal, and were fans of the original Deus Ex. While being described as essentially a series reboot, the team wanted to remain faithful to the original game's core values. In 2009, Eidos Interactive were purchased by Square Enix, who acted as the game's publisher. The scenario design was handled by a team led by Mary DeMarle, with Pacotti called in as an early consultant on the planned direction. Other notable staff included game director Jean-François Dugas, and art director Jonathan Jacques-Belletête, who created a notable artistic design blending cyberpunk aesthetics with colors and elements associated with the work of Johannes Vermeer and Rembrandt. The game's size and ambition proved problematic, with some aspects such as the boss battles needing to be outsourced to other groups.

While no sequel was planned for Human Revolution, its success prompted Eidos-Montréal to begin production on Mankind Divided after completing work on the DLC The Missing Link. Dugas returned as director, DeMarle as lead writer, and Jacques-Belletête acted as executive art director while Martin Dubeau took over as lead art director. The team's goal was to refine and expand upon the gameplay of Human Revolution, rebalancing elements of its design based on player feedback of Human Revolution. Production ended up running into trouble due to staffing issues, and production being split between the single-player campaign and the Breach multiplayer mode. Half the planned scenario ended up being cut.

Following rumors that the Deus Ex series had been put on hold due to low sales of Mankind Divided, Eidos-Montréal and Square Enix clarified that while no entry was in production at that time due to other projects, they planned to return to the series eventually. Writer Mark Cecere revealed in 2025 that there was a planned direct sequel which would conclude the story which began in Human Revolution, but the project was cancelled to focus on other games. Following the sale of Eidos-Montréal and associated former Eidos companies by Square Enix to Embracer Group, Embracer Group stated an interest to invest in the series through modern ports and new entries. A new entry was reportedly in development for two years before being cancelled in 2024 as part of mass layoffs from Embracer Group's studios. As of 2025, Eidos-Montréal was pitching a potential new entry to publishers.

== Reception ==
Aggregate review scores
Game	Metacritic
Deus Ex	(PC) 90/100 (PS2) 81/100
Deus Ex: Invisible War	(PC) 80/100 (Xbox) 84/100
Deus Ex: Human Revolution	(PC) 90/100 (PS3) 89/100 (X360) 89/100 (WIIU) 88/100
Deus Ex: Mankind Divided	(PC) 83/100 (PS4) 84/100 (XONE) 83/100

The original Deus Ex and its sequel Invisible War met with strong sales, and had sold a combined total of over two million units combined as of 2009. Human Revolution ranked high in sales charts during 2011, going on to sell over two million units. While no specific figures were given, Mankind Divided was stated to have seen commercial success. All versions of Human Revolution and Mankind Divided have sold a total of 12 million units worldwide as of 2022.

The Deus Ex series has been recognized as a notable series within gaming due to its freedom of choice and storytelling. In a 2013 retrospective article on the series legacy, IGN's Brian Albert felt that each game stood on its own merits despite some weaknesses in different design areas. As part of his article on the series for Retro Gamer, Ian Dransfield felt that the original game had never been bettered, while Human Revolution had proven a success, highlighting the enthusiastic following the series had despite seeing few releases. The original Deus Ex has been cited as an early and strong example of the immersive sim, with later entries also having this moniker attached.

During its original release Deus Ex saw critical acclaim for its gameplay design and bredth of player options, although its graphics and audio met with mixed reactions. Deus Ex has since ranked high in lists of the best video games of all time compiled by various publications, and according to Spector received over thirty "Best of" awards from various outlets during 2001. 1UP.com listed it as one of the most important games of all time, calling its influence "too massive to properly gauge".

At its initial release, Invisible War saw praise for its translation of the established Deus Ex gameplay onto a console, and while further praise was given to its story and gameplay, both were seen as weaker than the original due to different factors. However in retrospectives the game's staff voiced mixed sentiments towards it, and journalists have considered it to be the weakest entry in the series. Human Revolution saw acclaim for how well it continued the mechanical style of the original game, with praise going towards its overall design, narrative, and its visual designs. Criticism focused on its boss battles, which were seen as lacking options for players. Mankind Divided also met with praise from journalists for its narrative depth and improved gameplay. Criticism focused on the brevity of its main campaign, and how its themes were handled and portrayed in-game.
