= Deus Ex: Human Revolution =

2011 video game

- Developer: Eidos-Montréal (Note: Additional development by Grip Entertainment; original Microsoft Windows port by Nixxes Software; OS X ports by Feral Interactive; director's cut co-developed with Straight Right and Snowed In Studios.)
- Publisher: Square Enix (Note: Self-published under the name Eidos Interactive Corp following sale of Eidos-Montréal to Embracer Group in 2022)
- Director: Jean-François Dugas
- Producer: David Anfossi
- Designers: François Lapikas; Antoine Thisdale; Pierre-Francis Lafleur
- Programmers: Simon Hamelin; Julien Bouvrais
- Artist: Jonathan Jacques-Belletête
- Writer: Mary DeMarle
- Composer: Michael McCann
- Series: Deus Ex
- Engine: Crystal Engine
- Platforms: Windows; PlayStation 3; Xbox 360; Mac OS X; Wii U
- Release: August 23, 2011: Microsoft Windows, PlayStation 3, Xbox 360; NA: August 23, 2011; AU: August 25, 2011; EU: August 26, 2011 Mac OS X; WW: April 26, 2012 Wii U; NA: October 22, 2013; AU: October 24, 2013; EU: October 25, 2013
- Genres: Action role-playing, first-person shooter, stealth
- Mode: Single-player

Deus Ex: Human Revolution is an action role-playing game developed by Eidos-Montréal and published by Square Enix. The game is a prequel to the original Deus Ex (2000) and the third installment in the Deus Ex series. The gameplay combines first-person shooter, stealth, and role-playing elements. It features exploration and combat in environments connected to multiple city-based hubs, in addition to quests that grant experience and allow customization of the main character's abilities with items called Praxis Kits. Set in the year 2027, players control Adam Jensen, a security officer for Sarif Industries, a company which develops controversial artificial organs dubbed "augmentations". After an attack on Sarif, Jensen undergoes extensive augmentation and investigates the shadowy organization behind the attack. The story explores themes of transhumanism and the growing power of megacorporations and their impact on social class. It also uses the series' cyberpunk setting and conspiracy theory motif.

Development of Human Revolution began in 2007 with a small team within the fledgling Eidos-Montréal studio after failed attempts to create a sequel at original developer Ion Storm following Deus Ex: Invisible War (2003). The two key influences were the myth of Icarus, a thematic element carried over from Deus Ex, and the artwork and ideas of the Renaissance, which influenced the story, graphics, and music while combining with the series' typical cyberpunk elements. The open-ended gameplay was tricky for the team to achieve; the boss battles were outsourced to another developer due to time constraints. The music, composed by Michael McCann, focused on ambience and three-layered compositions over character themes and overt melodies. Human Revolution was announced in 2007, soon after its beginning development. Its title and release window were announced in 2010.

Human Revolution was released for PlayStation 3, Windows, and Xbox 360 in August 2011. The game received critical acclaim for its player-driven plot, gameplay, and freedom of choice in the story and character customization. The major criticisms went to its boss fights and technical problems. The director's cut was praised for its revamped gameplay. By November 2011, the original version had sold 2.18 million units. After release, a downloadable episode, The Missing Link, was developed, featuring gameplay improvements. A director's cut, featuring further improvements and additional content, was released in October 2013 for the original platforms and Wii U. The game was followed up with a spin-off, The Fall in 2013, and a direct sequel, Mankind Divided in 2016.

== Gameplay ==
A street corner in Lower Hengsha, one of the game's hub levels. The HUD with available hotkey options, Adam's health, and currently equipped weapon and ammunition level are shown.

Deus Ex: Human Revolution is an action role-playing game incorporating first-person shooter and stealth mechanics. Players take the role of Adam Jensen, a man equipped with mechanical cybernetic implants called augmentations. The game's environments, ranging from open world hubs to more scripted environments, are explored in first-person, although actions such as hiding behind cover, conversing with non-playable characters (NPCs), and some attack animations switch to a third-person view. In these environments, players can find NPCs who will advance both the main story quest and optional side quests: completing quests, along with other actions such as combat with enemies, rewards Adam with experience points, which raise his experience level. Also accessible are black market vendors that supply equipment and weapons for Credits, the in-game currency. Interactive objects within environments can be highlighted, although these options are either turned off on the hardest difficulty or can be turned off in the options menu by the player.

There are various ways to approach the game's situations: players can use a violent approach and shoot their way through environments while using cover to hide from enemy fire. Alternatively, Adam can take a stealthy approach, avoiding/knocking out guards and security devices and using cover to avoid enemy sight lines. Adam can move between cover elements and around corners while staying hidden. The melee takedown system offers lethal and non-lethal options, in addition to an assortment of lethal and non-lethal weapons. Adam can also move the bodies of enemies into hiding places, preventing them from being seen and raising an alarm. A crucial part of Adam's abilities are augmentations, which can be acquired and upgraded using Praxis Kits either bought from particular vendors, found in the game environments, or are automatically unlocked by leveling up: higher-level augmentations require more Praxis Kits to unlock. Augmentation functions can range from passive enhancements to Adam's vision or damage resistance to active upgrades such as allowing Adam to fall from great heights without injury or increase his strength. Some augmentations depend on Adam's energy level, deactivating after an amount of energy has been drained.

At multiple points within the game, Adam partakes in conversations with NPCs related to main and side quests. When talking, Adam is presented with three different conversation options that affect the outcome of conversations: choosing the right option can help with completing objectives while choosing the wrong option closes off that route and forces the player to find an alternate solution. A "Social" augmentation enables better reading of an NPC's expression and judging their psychological profile, improving chances of selecting the correct dialogue option. While in the game's environments, Adam finds terminals and computers that can be accessed with a password or through hacking. When hacking, the hacking screen is summoned, which shows the pathway through a device's security system to access the information: the pathway is accessed by opening "directory" nodes to reach the registry. Different nodes have different ratings, affecting how easily they can be accessed. Various devices have different grades of difficulty, which dictate how often hacking may be attempted. Each hacking attempt activates a Diagnostic Sub-Routine that works to stop the hack, activating a time limit once it is alerted. Adam can use additional skills and items to lengthen the time, such as software to stop or instantly capture nodes or fortify captured nodes to increase the time limit. Successful hacks yield experience points, Credits, and sometimes additional items.

== Synopsis ==
=== Setting ===
Human Revolution takes place in the year 2027, 25 years prior to the original Deus Ex. The Deus Ex series is set in a cyberpunk future rife with secret organizations and conspiracies: among these forces is the Illuminati. Leading up to Human Revolution, there have been marked improvements in human society, with people actively fighting global warming, finding cures for various diseases, and improving green energy. Alongside this, global megacorporations have come to eclipse government authority in power and influence, while private military forces dwarf the sanctioned armies of First World countries. Advances in biotechnology and cybernetics have led to the development of "augmentations", advanced artificial organs capable of significantly improving and enhancing the human body's performance. The development of augmentation technology has triggered a new social divide: those with augmentations become the world's new upper-class citizenry and are touted as the future of humanity, while normal humans form the majority of the lower-class population. Augmentations also require taking Neuropozyne, a limited and expensive immunosuppressive drug that stops the body from rejecting the technology. By the events of Human Revolution, society is being divided between "augs", humans who have accepted augmentation technology, and ordinary humans who are either morally opposed to it, too poor to afford it, or whose bodies actively reject it. The tensions between the two factions begin generating open conflict.

=== Characters ===
The main protagonist is Adam Jensen: coming from a humble background in Detroit, he worked as a leader with the local SWAT squad until he refused to follow a questionable order and was turfed out. After this, he is taken on as a security manager at Sarif Industries, a local company at the leading edge of augmentation technology. A fellow at the company is Megan Reed, a researcher for Sarif and Adam's ex-girlfriend. His employer is company CEO David Sarif, who is instrumental in saving Adam after he was left near-dead at the beginning of the game. Adam meets many key characters during his missions between Detroit, Montreal, and the new Shanghai metropolis of Hengsha. These include Sarif's chief pilot Faridah Malik; Sarif systems engineer Frank Pritchard; Eliza Cassan, a media personality and public face of Picus Communications; William Taggart, founder of the anti-augmentation group Humanity Front; Hugh Darrow, who founded augmentation technology but is one of those genetically incapable of using them; Zhao Yun Ru, CEO of the Tai Yong Medical megacorporation; and the "Tyrants" mercenary squad, composed of leader Jaron Namir and his associates Lawrence Barrett and Yelena Fedorova.

=== Plot ===
Note: While the general plot of Human Revolution follows a distinct path, many elements are subject to the player's decisions. The game also offers several subplots that the player may or may not encounter, depending on their actions within the game. This synopsis concentrates on the main, unavoidable plot thread of the game.

On the eve of unveiling a way to end Neuropozyne dependence for augmentations, Sarif Industries is attacked by a group of augmented terrorists, the Tyrants. Megan Reed and many other scientists are presumed dead in the attack, and Jensen is grievously wounded. Sarif saves Jensen by giving him advanced augmentations. Six months later, Jensen is summoned to deal with another terrorist attack by anti-augmentation radicals. Jensen finds an augmented terrorist trying to steal information, but is remotely killed before Jensen can capture him. Pritchard tracks the hacking signal to an abandoned factory in Highland Park. Jensen discovers the Tyrants guarding a FEMA detention camp, but they are moving out after the Sarif raid failed. Jensen defeats one of the mercenaries, Barrett, who tells him to go to the Hengsha megacity in China before launching a failed suicide attack.

In Hengsha, Jensen finds the original hacker Arie van Bruggen, who is being hunted by private security company Belltower Associates and hidden by local triad leader Tong Si Hung. Van Bruggen directs Adam to Tai Yong Medical, the world's largest augmentation technology manufacturer and Sarif's main rival. Infiltrating Tai Yong, Jensen finds evidence confirming the involvement of Zhao Yun Ru and Eliza Cassan with the Tyrants, along with the fact that Megan and the other scientists are alive. When confronted, Zhao reveals that is allied to an organization controlling global interests Jensen must escape. He then locates Eliza in Montreal, revealed to be an artificial intelligence construct designed to influence the media. Having started questioning her role, she decides to help Adam after he defeats her controller, the Tyrant Fedorova. Eliza provides evidence implicating Isaias Sandoval, an aide to William Taggart.

Back in Detroit, Sarif admits the Illuminati are behind the conspiracy, seeking to stop Sarif's advancements and preserve their power. Jensen infiltrates a Humanity Front rally and discovers Sandoval's location. Sandoval admits his involvement in the kidnapping and gives Jensen a lead to find the researchers. Jensen also encounters Hugh Darrow, who is working to stave off global warming with the Panchaea Facility in the Arctic. Returning to Hengsha in pursuit of one of the kidnapped scientist's tracking beacons, Jensen is ambushed by Belltower. He and other augmented people also begin experiencing glitches in their augmentation biochips. The beacon leads to Tong Si Hung, who now has the now-deceased Sarif Industries scientist's arm. With Tong's help, Jensen stows away in a stasis pod, waking up in a secret Singapore base days later.

Jensen, while coordinating with the scientists to escape, learns that the biochip malfunctions were staged to distribute a new biochip to control augmented humans. Jensen and the scientists stage a distraction, allowing him to infiltrate the facility's secret bunker. Defeating Namir, he confronts Megan about her actions, and she admits her research was based on Jensen's DNA. She was kidnapped for it, and reveals Darrow is also working with the Illuminati for his own ends. Moments later, Darrow broadcasts a modified signal that throws any augmented person with the new biochip into a murderous frenzy. Jensen evacuates the scientists and commandeers an orbital flight module to reach Panchaea. A confronted Darrow reveals that he wants humanity to abandon augmentation technology, believing it will destroy human identity. Jensen goes to shut down the signal at Panchaea's Hyron Project supercomputer, and on the way can find Taggart and Sarif, who want to further their agendas with his aid.

At the heart of Panchaea, Jensen fights Zhao Yun Ru, who tries to hijack the signal, and is then contacted by Eliza. Depending on whom he met, Jensen is offered up to four choices. Either broadcast the truth and distance humanity from augmentations; rig the broadcast so it blames Humanity Front and allows unrestricted augmentation development; send out a report to benefit the Illuminati's aims; or destroy Panchea, leaving no one to "spin the story". In a post-credits scene, Megan meets with Bob Page to discuss her employment in "the nanite virus chimera" and "D project": prior to this, Page instructs his cohort Morgan Everett to search the Hyron Project for salvageable technology for the 'Morpheus Initiative', setting up Deus Ex.

== Development ==
The original Deus Ex and its sequel Invisible War were developed by Ion Storm, with varying involvement of series creator and studio co-founder Warren Spector and designer Harvey Smith. After the release of Invisible War, multiple attempts were made to develop a sequel, even after Spector left Ion Storm. The two main projects were dubbed Deus Ex: Insurrection, which used the same engine as Invisible War while moving away from its divisive mechanics, and Deus Ex 3, which aimed to be an open-world game with a branching narrative. An aborted attempt, intended as the fourth Deus Ex project following Insurrection, led to the development of Project Snowblind. Future development on the third Deus Ex game was halted when, following further staff departure and financial difficulties, the studio's owner Eidos Interactive closed them down in 2005.

Concept development on Human Revolution began in early 2007, shortly after the founding of Eidos-Montréal. The team at this point was pretty small, consisting of producer David Anfossi, director Jean-François Dugas, senior designer François Lapikas, and art director Jonathan Jacques-Belletête. The early period was devoted to research before performing brainstorming sessions to create the game's basic concepts. One of the concepts established early on was that it would be an ambitious project, and they needed to bring the key staff on board as early as possible. They started with playing the first two games, determining what they liked and disliked about the original Deus Ex and how they could carry over or improve these points. An early decision was to remain faithful to the series' core values, despite Human Revolution being essentially a series reboot. When presenting their project to Eidos management, they presented multiple sheets of their concept, and after two days, the game was green-lit. The entire main staff were newcomers to the Deus Ex series, providing a significant challenge to the development team. During the early design process, one of the things that worked well was the blueprint testing process and cutting items that would either not fit into the game or make the project too large to handle. The most challenging period for the development team was the opening two-year period, which was described as a "vertical slice" through the game concepts when they were trying to bring a piece of Human Revolution to retail quality before extending that out across the whole game.

Human Revolution was planned for consoles and Microsoft Windows systems, and Dugas insisted that the PC version would not be a port of the console versions. With this in mind, the two versions needed to be as close as possible in gameplay feel. The full motion cutscenes were created collaboratively by Eidos-Montréal, Square Enix's CGI department Visual Works, and Vancouver-based company Goldtooth Creative. Goldtooth created initial concepts based on the game; then, the animation proper was handled by Visual Works. Visual Works has been involved with the project since 2009, following the acquisition of Eidos by Square Enix. It was later stated that, despite the need to incorporate multiple story-telling methods into the game, the team felt that the cutscene creation process was turned into a multi-studio effort due to time constraints. Time limits also forced them to drop real-time cutscenes. For the engine, the team used the Crystal Engine, developed by Crystal Dynamics for use in their upcoming next-generation Tomb Raider. This was part of a technology-sharing policy that would further improve the engine for distribution in an enhanced form. Despite the initial intentions and an early tech demo going smoothly, the engine quickly proved inadequate to the team's needs as Eidos-Montréal and Crystal Dynamics were pulling the engine's design in different directions. Eidos-Montréal was permitted to branch away from the core engine so they could make the game work, adding new production tools that made it work in the new environment.

=== Game design ===
Lapikas was responsible for multiple aspects of the game as lead designer, including the cover system, augmentations, conversations, hacking, combat and stealth AI, interactive objects, and general balancing. When creating the gameplay, the team settled on four pillar concepts: "Combat", "Stealth", "Hacking", and "Social". While gameplay took place primarily in first-person, a feature that had been part of the Deus Ex series since its inception, the camera switched to a third-person view during specific actions. This was because the team wanted to create a connection between players and Adam despite the risk that it might break immersion. Augmentations were designed to be customizable by players depending on playstyle, but unlike the previous two Deus Ex games, mechanical augmentations and switches to third-person view enabled the player to see their changes affect Adam's appearance.

For combat, multiple references were used. These included Rainbow Six: Vegas for the cover system and tactical combat; F.E.A.R. for the design of AI; BioShock for the interlinking of weapon and obstacle types; the Call of Duty series for the regenerating health system; and Resident Evil 4 for multiple aspects including the inventory system, game economy and contextual actions. Regenerating health ended up divisive among the fanbase during the game's run-up to release, despite being seen as a necessary inclusion in the modern gaming market. Combat was intended to be easy to understand and visceral, with enemy types ranging from normal humans to augmented humans to robots, all mixed and matched for different combat situations. For stealth gameplay, the team used Metal Gear Solid as a reference for the AI and alert systems and The Chronicles of Riddick: Escape from Butcher Bay for the general organic feel of stealth. They had similar precepts to combat, wanting to make this style's rules and rewards clear to players. Interactive hacking was one of the earliest things the team had decided upon, alongside not including quick time events. The Hacking mechanics were inspired by the tabletop role-playing game Shadowrun. They were designed to invoke tension and require a survey of the surroundings and the security system while simultaneously providing rewards. Social interactions followed similar patterns, becoming an extension of the general gameplay with a similar risk-reward system.

The team had initially wanted to create the game's boss battles in-house around the game's similar elements of player choice, with their initial design inspired by the boss fights in Metal Gear Solid. As the development of the story and gameplay framework took priority, boss battles became less and less of a focus. It eventually reached a point when the main development team could not complete them in time for the game's release. The team contemplated cutting them, but that would have negatively impacted the story and other areas of the game's design. In the end, the development of the boss battles was outsourced to Grip Entertainment. Having been given access to the game's engine, Grip Entertainment was tasked with creating the boss battles and incorporating them into the framework of Human Revolution. For this, they needed to incorporate their technology into the system, working from Eidos' specifications while bringing their development style to bear on the project. They also attempted to balance the boss fights' action-focused approach with the other elements within Human Revolution so it would be accessible to all players.

=== Scenario ===
The script of Human Revolution was written by Mary DeMarle, the narrative director and main writer. While she acted as chief writer, DeMarle also worked with many others throughout development so that the story could be conveyed through environments and dialogue, along with handling how player choices influenced its progression. Sheldon Pacotti, the main writer for the first two Deus Ex games, was a story consultant during early development and was contacted regularly through production to ensure that the storyline fitted adequately within the series chronology. A total of four writers worked on the game, including author James Swallow. DeMarle was brought onto the project four months into its development after it had been decided that it would be a prequel to the first game, focusing on mechanical rather than nanotechnological enhancement technology. As part of her research, DeMarle looked up multiple subjects, from speculated conspiracy theories to the current level of biotechnology: the final story was largely influenced by her reading of non-fiction and writings concerning transhumanism. DeMarle compared the game's study of transhumanism through the main character, Adam, to that in the 1982 film Blade Runner while also using the video game medium to put questions surrounding the ethics and motivations surrounding transhumanism in a nuanced way. She also stated that Adam being forced to confront these issues in person was the narrative's central irony, which had previously been explored using different narrative elements in Deus Ex. The ending, which was ultimately decided using a choice of buttons, was chosen because of technical and time constraints while retaining player interaction. While the gameplay evolved continually through development and some elements required cutting, the story remained almost unchanged, instead being further refined and improved to work out plot holes.

When creating the character of Adam Jensen, DeMarle wanted to give him a well-defined personality, which necessitated balancing it with the narrative's player-driven nature. One of the biggest challenges was creating the various dialogue choices, as she needed to imagine what a character would say if they were hostile when she might typically portray them as benign. Multiple layers of dialogue were created within these variances to create different atmospheres within the narrative. There was standard dialogue with minor characters, more complex dialogue with major characters in quests, and what DeMarle termed "conversation boss fights", dialogue tied to the gameplay where social skill could help the player reach an objective. When creating characters, the team drew inspiration from the character portrayals in the Metal Gear series. When designing the corporate side, DeMarle particularly cited the backgrounds of Howard Hughes, Richard Branson and Bill Gates as inspiration for the influential CEO figures in the narrative of Human Revolution. She also noted how corporations had gained greater power than governments in the narrative, which paralleled political comments on corporate power at the time.

The world of Human Revolution was designed to parallel the Greek myth of Icarus; in the myth, Icarus was flying with artificial wings, but flew too close to the sun and destroyed his wings, causing his fatal fall. The world's new reliance on and experimentation with augmentation technology mirrored the myth, with the game's narrative taking place at a crucial tipping point, the outcome of which would be decided by the player. The general focus on technology and its effect on human society is also tied into the game's visual themes. The development team used multiple sources as references while creating the world and scenario. The Children of Men was used to capture the setting and resultant chaotic drama; BioShock gave them a reference for handling mature themes, while the television series Rome showed how influential people's ambitions shaped history. The sense of tension between augmented and normal humans was inspired by the similar tension between humans and mutants in the X-Men franchise. For the conspiracy elements of the plot, the team used the novels Deception Point, The Firm, and Frank Herbert's Dune saga as inspiration. The Grand Theft Auto and Mass Effect franchises directly inspired he desired quality of cutscenes and dialogue. DeMarle termed the final product as a study in contrasts, as the implementation of augmentation technology had created a new form of a divided social class system when other social barriers had fallen. Other themes used earlier in Deus Ex, such as exploring a culture of fear; the workings of a surveillance state; and the exploitation created by economic inequality, were paralleled in Human Revolution. The team created supplementary written material such as emails, e-books, and cell phone-like devices called pocket secretaries to add more depth to the world and narrative.

=== Art design ===
Concept artwork of the city hub of Hengsha. While still carrying cyberpunk themes, the aesthetics and colors drew inspiration from Renaissance-era artwork.

Jonathan Jacques-Belletête acted as the game's art director, being in charge of creating its look. The two key visual themes were the Icarus myth and the artwork of the Renaissance: both were woven in on a narrative and visual level. In terms of colors, the team drew inspiration from notable Renaissance artists, including Johannes Vermeer and Rembrandt. The color scheme was dominated by black and gold: black represented the game's dystopian aspects, while gold represented humanity and hope for the future. The Renaissance styling originally permeated everything, but they ended up with crates looking like baroque furniture, so they toned it down and blended it with modern and cyberpunk elements. During development, the team coined the term "cyber-renaissance" to define their blending of Renaissance styling, cyberpunk elements, and the Icarus myth. An extensive amount of concept art was created for the game: while the majority was handled by artists Richard Dumont and Eric Gagnon, other contributors included Jim Murray, Brian Dugan, Theirry Doizon, Trong Nguyen and Sébastien Larroudé.

While cyberpunk remained a core part of the game, the team were faced with the trouble that no-one really knew what cyberpunk was anymore: the most recent game and film references they had were from the early 2000s, as many works that might have been classed as cyberpunk were now being treated as science fiction. While they could easily have replicated the atmosphere of films like Blade Runner, the team wanted to create something original within the genre. Something that concerned the team was about portraying the world of Human Revolution in relation to the original Deus Ex, which chronologically took place 25 years later: while the original Deus Ex used technological elements common at the time it was made such as 4:3 aspect ratio monitors and landline telephones, Human Revolution used mobiles and wide-screen televisions. According to Jacques-Belletête, this separation was ultimately put down to the differing portrayals of the world between the two games: while Deus Ex was set in poor communities and focused on the social impact of new technology, Human Revolution focused on the high end of society and technology's physical impact.

Jacques-Belletête worked on character designs with Murray, whose previous work included artwork for the comic series 2000 AD. Before designing character costumes, Jacques-Belletête looked extensively at modern fashion. As focusing purely on Renaissance styling would have resulted in clothing styles deemed "too allegoric" to work in the game, they redesigned them so they included Renaissance and cyberpunk elements while resembling clothing people would wear in the present day and not appearing clichéd. For Adam's character design, the team looked at multiple protagonist from cyberpunk fiction, from Blade Runner to the original Deus Ex. Their main wishes were to incorporate sunglasses and a trench coat. Jacques-Belletête moderated his design to combine Renaissance aesthetics with the cyberpunk thematics: he defined it as being able to see Adam's augmented state in combat during the brief third-person camera moments while still seeing him having a meal in a high-class restaurant. One design which had him sleeveless throughout the game was scrapped as it made him "look like a douche". Instead, they created two looks: a sleeveless action-oriented look for missions, and a sleeved trench coat with a high collar and geometric patterning to portray the Renaissance elements. In total, it took two years and a half to finalize Adam's design, with multiple designs being rejected as they failed to properly balance the cyberpunk and Renaissance elements.

The team wanted to make the game as consistently realistic as possible, wishing to avoid the situation of realistic character models standing in front of low-resolution backgrounds. They created varying degrees of technical advancement for different locations: the most realistic location they created was the Detroit hub, while the most advanced was the two-level fictional metropolis of Hengsha. Architecture in the Detroit area was inspired by then-modern buildings from Japan and Europe. Jacques-Belletête spent a long time researching furniture designs while creating interiors for in-game environments, joking that they could fill an IKEA catalog with the results. Multiple other hub locations were planned, including the upper levels of Hengsha, and an area of Montreal dubbed "Plateau" that featured "very specific architecture, called tri-plexes, with twirling exterior staircases made of [...] old metal". At the beginning of production, there were even plans to feature a hub location in India. When it became clear how much work it would be, the team cut out what could not be managed. Upper Hengsha was built but never finished before being scrapped.

=== Music ===
Deus Ex: Human Revolution Original Soundtrack

Soundtrack album by Michael McCann
- Released: November 15, 2011
- Genres: Video game soundtrack; electronic; ambient
- Length: 1:07:21
- Label: Sumthing Else Music Works
- Producer: Michael McCann

The music of Human Revolution was composed by Michael McCann, who worked on the score from 2008 to 2011. McCann also handled production, performance, mixing, and arranging. Additional arrangements were done by Francois Arbour and Eric Arvisais. Vocals were provided by Andrea Revel and Courtney Wing. McCann, when comparing Human Revolution with his prior work on Ubisoft's Tom Clancy's Splinter Cell: Double Agent, stated that the latter could be scored more like a feature film due to its linear nature, while Human Revolution's non-linear approach to both gameplay and story made composition more challenging. McCann's music for Human Revolution was focused around the game's multilayered dualistic themes, which he described as "technology/nature, past/future, wealth/poverty", all of which were encompassed by the general transhumanist theme. McCann and sound director Steve Szczepkowski initially started out using dark electronic scoring typical of the cyberpunk genre, but during the three-year period he worked on the game the music gradually became more "organic". He was influenced by the visuals' Renaissance styling, convincing him to blend organic and traditional cyberpunk elements. The electronic elements were influenced by the film music of John Carpenter, Vangelis, and the band Tangerine Dream. The acoustic mood elements were inspired by the work of Lisa Gerrard, Ennio Morricone and Elliot Goldenthal. Outside films, he was strongly influenced by electronic bands and musicians, such as Amon Tobin and the band Massive Attack.

The musical structure was defined by him as "three-sided", mimicking the thematic use of triangles in the game. His three musical elements were acoustics (vocals, strings) representing the past; electronic music representing the future; and the present being a mixture of the two in both style and instrumentation. Vocals also evoked slight religious overtones, which again connected to the use of the number three due to the number's multiple religious associations, in turn suggested and influenced by the Renaissance atmosphere. Another example of three-fold design was the ambient music, which needed to vary between quiet, tense, and active, depending on Adam's situation: each piece was constructed as a standalone cue that would interact with its fellows depending on the flow of gameplay. This presented a challenge to McCann about the handling of themes and melodies, as short cues might grow repetitive over time. Individual environments were also designed to contrast each other musically. An example given by McCann was different areas of the main city hubs: in the wealthy areas of Hengsha, the music evokes light and wealth, while in the poor areas of Detroit, it would be dark to reflect lawlessness and the surrounding decay. This necessity of intertwining music with the environment meant that McCann needed to keep the music minimal enough to be unobtrusive while still being noticeable.

McCann did not design any specific character themes, instead keeping any recurring themes ambiguous. He gave both stylistic and technical reasons for this: technically the music system was too simple to allow for a large number of unique musical cues, and stylistically it worked on a technical and musical level for there to be no specific musical themes influencing the player's judgement of characters and situations. The cues for hacking sequences were created fairly early in the process, and was one of a group of cues McCann created during a break from the project. A piece he commented on in 2010 was "Icarus", the game's main theme. He created special versions for the game's reveal trailer, including a six-minute version broken into five sections for the director's cut of the trailer. He worked on creating the theme for two months, starting out with piano, vocals and minimal synthesizer work before building the full layers onto it. The final layer added were "synth arpeggios" that completed the piece's transformation into a full piece of cyberpunk-themed music. The "Icarus" theme, and by extension the soundtrack, also tied into the game's overall themes and motifs.

A soundtrack disc was included in the limited "Augmented Edition". An official album, Deus Ex: Human Revolution Original Soundtrack, was released on November 15, 2011. It was released through Sumthing Else Music Works as a physical and digital release. The album contained 25 tracks created from 50 out of the 200 pieces created for the game. The tracks included both cues from the game and arranged versions used in trailers. McCann chose the tracks to represent the game's story, drawing on the various styles of the music as a whole. He used the official album release to accentuate what he had been doing for the soundtrack as a whole. He initially wanted the soundtrack to be two discs, but realized that this would lead to repetition, so limited himself to a single disc. The remaining unreleased pieces were left out because of that potential repetition. The soundtrack received praise from multiple music critics: Original Sound Version's Gideon Dabi, commenting on the game's music prior to the album's commercial release, was highly positive about McCann's work, calling it "a tremendous upgrade over its predecessors" and praising its low-key impact. Simon Elchlepp, writing for Video Game Music Online, gave the album 4/5 stars: he called it "a very satisfying experience", praising the score's connection to the game's themes and overall quality despite some perceived missteps about use of its main theme. RPGFan's Liz Maas said that, while it trended towards being generic, with the track "Barrett Boss Fight" being most guilty of this, it managed to remain consistent with its themes and was worth buying.

== Release ==
A third entry in the Deus Ex series was stated to be in development at Eidos-Montréal in May 2007 by Eidos France director Patrick Melchior during an interview on MusiquePlus. At the time, Eidos did not comment on the story. Eidos-Montréal project manager Stéphane D'Astous confirmed the game's existence in November, stating that concept approval had only just been granted. An initial teaser trailer was released on November 26, 2007. The title, first details, and original release window were announced at the 2010 Game Developers Conference. It was published worldwide by Square Enix. While originally scheduled for 2010, the game was shifted to beyond April the following year so the team could further polish the gameplay. It was released for PlayStation 3 (PS3), Xbox 360, and Microsoft Windows personal computers (PC). The gameplay was identical across all platforms barring control schemes. Originally Eidos had intended to make the PC retail version of the game region locked. The reason behind this was due to DVD limitations which meant the languages on the game had to be split. However, due to negative reaction from the public, this lock was not implemented.

The PC port was outsourced by Eidos-Montréal to Nixxes Software, who also worked with Eidos on multiple projects including the PC port of Lara Croft and the Guardian of Light. The decision to outsource the PC port was made because the team wanted to make a quality port, but their team could not handle the three different versions. Nixxes were chosen as they had already been collaborating with the project, were a trusted port developer, and had a deep understanding of the game's engine. The two teams kept in constant contact, working from the same code base so the PC and console versions were as close as possible in terms of content and graphics. To create the port, Nixxes developed a DirectX 11 renderer that the PC version would use, which enabled the inclusion of multiple graphical tweaks and extra touches such as adding tessellation and extra anti-aliasing options. The controls and HUD were customized to work with a computer keyboard. The initial response to the announcement of the PC port's outsourcing was mixed, which made the teams more determined to deliver a high-quality port. Further technical assistance was provided by Advanced Micro Devices. The game was also ported to Apple Inc.'s OS X platform. First announced in September 2011 after the other versions were released, the porting was handled by Feral Interactive, who had made their name porting games such as BioShock and Max Payne to the platform.

It was released in August 2011 in major Western regions: it was released in North America on August 23, Australia on August 25, and Europe on August 26. In addition to the standalone releases, special editions were created featuring extra content in North America and Europe. The "Explosive Mission Pack" included a mission focusing on a central character from Deus Ex along with additional weapons and equipment. The "Augmented Edition" included all content from the "Explosive Mission Pack" in addition to new equipment and in-game bonuses. The European version sported a few extra items than the North American version. A separate pack included codes to unlock Deus Ex-themed items for Team Fortress 2 for pre-orders on Steam. The OS X port was released on April 26, 2012. The version released was the "Ultimate Edition", including all pre-order content in addition to downloadable content (DLC) released the previous year. A minor controversy arose around the PC version when video game retailer GameStop started removing content from the original packaging. GameStop had instructed employees to remove coupons for free access to Human Revolution on OnLive, an online game service, stating that the coupon promoted a competitor of one of its subsidiaries, Spawn Labs and Impulse, which it had recently acquired. As an apology, GameStop began giving customers a $50 gift card in-store to those who purchased copies of Deus Ex: Human Revolution for PC prior to August 26 and who brought the issue to their staff.

The game was localized for and released in Japan for PS3 and Xbox 360, and included all pre-order content. The PS3 version also included the English voice track. The game's subtitle was cut for Japan, being released simply as Deus Ex (デウスエクス, Deusuekusu). It was given a "Z" rating by country's CERO entertainment rating board, equivalent to the North American ESRB's "Adults Only" rating, although it still underwent editing to remove some overtly violent and suggestive content, the display of which is prohibited under Japanese law. Initially planned for release alongside Bandai Namco's Tales of Xillia, it was pushed forward into the following month due to CERO requesting a further edit. It was eventually released on October 20.

=== The Missing Link ===
A DLC episode set during the main game, Deus Ex: Human Revolution – The Missing Link, was released digitally on October 18 for Steam and Xbox Live, and October 19 for PlayStation Network (PSN). It likewise debuted in Japan for the console versions: it was released on PSN on March 7, 2012, and March 20 for Xbox Live. Set during a transitional event in-game, the plot sees Adam captured and stripped of his augmentations, having to escape and navigate a cargo ship and then a base operated by Belltower.

Plans for DLC were first announced in August 2010, with it being planned as an extension of the game. The developers initially did not plan for DLC, with it beginning development later in the game's production when the visual theme was finalized. Despite using only core team members, development was slow due to the main focus being on Human Revolution. For The Missing Link, the team attempted to improve the lighting, gameplay mechanics, player freedom, and character animation. The DLC was developed entirely at Eidos-Montréal, and this gave the team the opportunity of developing a boss fight with multiple solutions, something they regretted not being able to do with the main game.

=== Director's Cut ===
A director's cut of Human Revolution, Deus Ex: Human Revolution – Director's Cut, was announced in April 2013. It was co-produced by Eidos-Montréal, Australian developer Straight Right — who had previously handled the Wii U port of Mass Effect 3 — and Canada-based Snowed In Studios. Originally announced as a Wii U exclusive, it was later announced that it would also be released on its original platforms. One of the major changes was the boss arenas: while they could not create non-lethal options to take down bosses, the team created alternative strategies for players who took a stealthy and otherwise non-lethal path. They also made adjustments to the energy system, improved enemy AI, and upgrades to the lighting and shading systems. These changes were carried over from the development of The Missing Link, which had been developed based on the team's wishes to improve on aspects of the main game. While previous ports of major games for Wii U had been underwhelming in the eyes of the gaming public, Eidos-Montréal saw it as a chance to create the "ultimate" version of Human Revolution.

The Wii U version of Director's Cut was priced higher than the other console versions; according to the staff, this was because of its added features. Console versions included a second screen option for some functions: the Wii U GamePad was used for the Wii U, PlayStation Vita for the PS3 version, Xbox SmartGlass for the Xbox 360 version. When originally developed for the Wii U, it was intended to make playing the game easier, along with evoking some of the early impressions from the initial CGI trailer from 2010. The decision to port Director's Cut to multiple platforms was based on fan feedback requesting a multiplatform release. The Director's Cut included all the additional content alongside the main game, from the added equipment to the DLC episode The Missing Link, here incorporated into the main game. Also included was audio commentary from the developers activated using icons scattered through levels, and a documentary on the game's creation. For owners of the original PC version, a cheap upgrade option was offered, with the price varying depending on how much of the additional content owners possessed. It was released for Wii U, PC, PS3 and Xbox 360 on October 22, 2013. It was released on OS X, April 16, 2014. Like the main game, its port was handled by Feral Interactive. Additionally, the Director's Cut can be purchased from the Xbox digital store and played on Xbox One and Xbox Series consoles through the Xbox backwards compatibility program.

=== Related media ===
A promotional limited comic series was produced in the run up to the game's release. The comic was written by Robbie Morrison, and drawn by Sergio Sandoval and Trevor Hairsine. The cover art was handled by Murry, while both McMarle and Jacques-Belletête took supervisory roles for the story and artwork respectively. The comic was published by DC Comics between February 9 and June 20, 2011.

A spin-off novel, Deus Ex: Icarus Effect, was written by Swallow. It was a story set around the same time as the main game, following new characters Ben Saxon and Anna Kelso as they uncover a hidden conspiracy. First announced in July 2010, it was published by Titan Books on February 22, 2011. A second novel by Swallow, Deus Ex: Fallen Angel, was released as a free online download alongside the release of the Director's Cut: the novel details Malik's early life in Hengsha. A film adaptation was also announced, planned by Eidos-Montréal and CBS Films: based on the story of Human Revolution, Scott Derrickson was attached as director and co-writer, C. Robert Cargill as co-writer, and Roy Lee and Adrian Askarieh as producers.

== Reception ==
Reception

Aggregate score
Aggregator	Score
Metacritic	PC (Original): 90/100; PC (Director's Cut): 91/100; PS3: 89/100; X360: 89/100; WIIU (Director's Cut): 88/100

Review scores
Publication	Score
1Up.com	A
Eurogamer	9/10
Famitsu	36/40
Game Informer	8.5/10
GameSpot	8.5/10 (Original); 8/10 (Director's Cut)
IGN	9.0/10 (Original); 8.3/10 (Director's Cut)
Official Nintendo Magazine	90% (Director's Cut)
Official Xbox Magazine (UK)	10/10
PC Gamer (UK)	94%

The game received widespread critical acclaim upon release. Review aggregate site Metacritic gave the game scores of 90/100 for PC, and 89/100 for PS3 and Xbox 360. These were based on 52, 50 and 70 critic reviews respectively. Reception of Director's Cut was also generally positive: Metacritic gave the Wii U and PC versions scores of 88/100 and 91/100, respectively based on 30 and 4 critic reviews.

Tom Bramwell of Eurogamer praised the story's fit within the game mechanics, additionally praising the side quests for how they fleshed out the world and positively comparing the dialogue and character interaction to a boxing match. Game Informer's Andrew Reiner called the story and world "riveting", though found some of the mechanics annoying. Kevin VanOrd, writing for GameSpot, positively noted the story's style and exploration of contemporary themes. Arthur Gies of IGN found the story held up throughout despite some awkward writing. PC Gamer's Tom Francis did not comment much on the story, rather noting its scale and the various environmental details that fleshed it out for players. Mike Channell of Official Xbox Magazine called the game one of the most intelligently-written games for the console, praising both the main narrative and side quests despite some supporting characters' stories being left unfinished. Famitsu noted that the game had a high amount of player choice, positively referencing the conversation choices presented to them.

Bramwell was positive about the overall gameplay, citing hacking as his favorite activity, although he noted that the game's limitations stood out because of the overall quality. Reiner was positive about the general experience, but found fault in the enemy AI and general balancing issues. VanOrd praised the freedom of choice and playtime, but found the weak enemy AI distracted from the overall experience. Gies likewise praised the amount of choice offered to players, finding its stealth and action gameplay equally strong. Francis positively compared the number of options open to the player to the original Deus Ex despite some linear design choices, praised the hacking for its more interactive form than earlier Deus Ex games, and enjoyed both the action and stealth gameplay. Channell, while noting that pre-augmentation combat was "clumsy", was generally positive about the way combat evolved and praised its focus on stealth and conversation mechanics. Famitsu was highly positive about the gameplay, feeling that it successfully hybridized the role-playing and first-person shooter genres, praising character customization and enemy AI. Unanimous criticism was directed at the boss battles, which multiple critics found either poorly executed or at odds with the rest of the experience.

Bramwell positively noted the level design while criticizing repetition within interior environments. Reiner found Jensen's voice actor inexpressive and facial animations "robotic", but praised the soundtrack despite its similarity to the music of Mass Effect and generally lauded the world design. VanOrd, while praising the visuals, found the facial animations dated and noted long load times as being among some of the technical problems encountered. Gies greatly praised the game's artstyle and music, while also noting technical difficulties and faulting the voice acting. Frances similarly called the mission environments "gorgeous". Channel praised its visuals, and called its voice acting "impeccable".

In his review of the Director's Cut, IGN's Brian Albert, despite noting inconsistencies in enemy behavior, shared much of his praised with the original version in addition to the added gameplay mechanics and improved boss battles. GameSpot''s VanOrd again noted dated facial animations and poor AI, but generally praised other aspects of the Director's Cut, particularly pointing out the improvements to boss battles. Bramwell, again writing for Eurogamer, particularly praised the revamped boss battles and the inclusion of additional content such as The Missing Link that did not function properly as a standalone release. He also echoed much of his praise for the original game. Michael Gapper of Official Nintendo Magazine stated that all the changes made to the game for the Director's Cut had improved it for the better, praising its gameplay balance and freedom of choice in addition to the new features.

During the 15th Annual Interactive Achievement Awards, the Academy of Interactive Arts & Sciences nominated Human Revolution for "Role-Playing/Massively Multiplayer Game of the Year" and "Outstanding Achievement in Character Performance" (Adam Jensen).

=== Sales ===
Upon its release in North America, despite coming in during the later half of the month, Human Revolution became the top-selling video game in August. It remained in the top ten bestselling games in September, dropping to sixth place. In the United Kingdom, the game likewise debuted in first place in the all-format game software charts, not including digital sales: the majority of sales were on Xbox 360, with a 57% ratio. 31% was sold on PS3, while 13% of sales were for PCs. Its total sales in its first week were nearly one million units, described as "just 26,000 units away from Invisible War's lifetime sales". It was later classed as the second bestselling game of the month behind Zumba Fitness. In the following weeks, it continued to rank high in the top ten bestselling games for the region: it remained the top seller in the second week despite a 47% sales drop, while by late September it had dropped to fifth place. It was the UK's 21st bestselling game of 2011. Total sales of Human Revolution, as reported in November 2011, reached 2.18 million copies in North America and Europe: 800,000 were sold in North America, while Europe showed stronger sales of 1.38 million. The positive sales of Human Revolution contributed to publisher Square Enix posting triple its predicted profits for the April–September period, with the publisher calling the sales a "favorable result". By May 2022, Human Revolution (including the Director's cut) and Mankind Divided had sold a combined 12 million units.

== Sequels ==
Following the release of Human Revolution, a mobile spin-off, Deus Ex: The Fall, was developed by N-Fusion Interactive. The Fall is a sequel to Icarus Effect, following the later adventures of protagonists Saxon and Kelso. It was released in July 2013 for iOS, and in 2014 for Android and PC. A new entry in the series was announced as being in development in 2013, alongside the release date for the Director's Cut. The game, Deus Ex: Mankind Divided, is a direct sequel to Human Revolution, taking place two years after the ending where Adam destroyed Panchea, in a world that has rejected augmentation technology and segregated those who possess it. It was released in August 2016. Mankind Divided forms part of a series-wide project dubbed the "Deus Ex Universe", with both games and additional media designed to expand upon the series setting.
