= Michael McCann (composer) =

Canadian composer (born 1976)

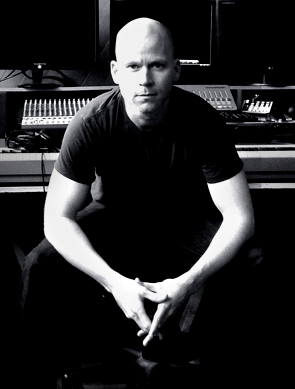
- Michael McCann in 2010

Background information
- Also known as: Behavior, Suture, Michael A. McCann
- Born: Michael Anthony McCann; March 5, 1976 (age 49)
- Genres: Electronic, ambient, trip hop, soundtrack, classical, pop
- Occupations: Composer, producer, musician, sound designer
- Instruments: Piano, Percussion, Drums, Guitar, Synthesizer, sampling, Programming
- Labels: Behavior Music, Sumthing Else, Skill Tree, IAm8Bit,
- Website: michaelmccann.io

Michael Anthony McCann is a Canadian composer for television, video games and film. He is best known for composing the scores to the video games Tom Clancy's Splinter Cell: Double Agent, Deus Ex: Human Revolution, XCOM: Enemy Unknown, Deus Ex: Mankind Divided and Borderlands 3.

McCann's music incorporates elements of electronic, orchestral and traditional acoustic instruments, and often includes the use of world, choral, and solo vocals (primarily female, and primarily lyric-less). His scoring work, as well as solo and production work, bridges multiple genres including ambient, world, jazz, break-beat, post-rock, trip-hop, drum and bass, industrial, rock and pop.

McCann has received award nominations for his work in television, games & film, from the British Academy of Film and Television Arts, Academy of Interactive Arts & Sciences, IGN, Spike TV Video Game Awards, G.A.N.G., Hollywood Music In Media Awards, and G4TV X-Play. His sound-design work on the film It's All Gone Pete Tong also earned him two Genie Award nominations for Best Overall Sound Editing and Best Overall Sound.

Past projects include original composition work for MTV, VH1, Discovery Channel, The Gap / Old Navy, Paramount Pictures, Alliance Atlantis (various films / trailers), Showcase, Audiokinetic, Odeon Films, Ubisoft, NASA, the Canadian Space Agency, FUBAR (as supervising sound-designer), and various commercials and independent films.

== Awards and nominations ==
Year	Award	Title	Category	Result
2020	G.A.N.G. Awards	Borderlands 3	Music of the Year	Nominated
2020	G.A.N.G. Awards	Borderlands 3	Best Original Score	Nominated
2019	Hollywood Music in Media Awards	Borderlands 3	Original Score - Video Game	Nominated
2015	CLIO Awards	Deus Ex: Mankind Divided "Announce Trailer"	Silver Key Art Award (Audio / Visual)	Won
2012	BAFTA Video Game Awards	Deus Ex: Human Revolution	Best Original Music	Nominated
2012	Canadian Video Game Awards	Deus Ex: Human Revolution	Best Original Music	Won
2011	Cue Awards		Breakout Composer of the Year	Nominated
2011	Cue Awards	Deus Ex: Human Revolution	Best Score in Film / Media	Nominated
2011	Cue Awards	Deus Ex: Human Revolution	Best Score for a Video Game	Nominated
2011	Cue Awards	Deus Ex: Human Revolution "Icarus"	Most Memorable Theme	Nominated
2011	Spike TV Video Game Awards	Deus Ex: Human Revolution	Best Original Score	Nominated
2011	Hollywood Music In Media Awards	Deus Ex: Human Revolution	Best Original Score	Nominated
2011	G4TV X-Play Awards	Deus Ex: Human Revolution	Best Original Score	Nominated
2008	Hollywood Music Awards	ReGenesis	Best TV Theme	Nominated
2007	Academy of Interactive Arts & Sciences	Tom Clancy's Splinter Cell: Double Agent	Best Original Score	Nominated
2007	G.A.N.G. Awards	Tom Clancy's Splinter Cell: Double Agent	Best Interactive Score	Nominated
2006	IGN's "Best of 2006"	Tom Clancy's Splinter Cell: Double Agent	Best Original Score (Xbox 360)	
2006	Genie Awards	It's All Gone Pete Tong	Best Overall Sound	Nominated
2006	Genie Awards	It's All Gone Pete Tong	Best Achievement in Sound Editing	Nominated
2005	Leo Awards	It's All Gone Pete Tong	Best Overall Sound	Won
2005	Leo Awards	It's All Gone Pete Tong	Best Overall Sound Editing	Won
2004	Toronto International Film Festival	It's All Gone Pete Tong	Best Canadian Feature Film	Won
2002	Sundance Film Festival	FUBAR	Official Selection	
