= Eidos-Montréal =

Canadian video game developer

Eidos Interactive Corporation
- Trade name: Eidos-Montréal
- Type: Subsidiary
- Industry: Video games
- Founded: 26 November 2007; 18 years ago
- Founder: Stéphane D'Astous
- Headquarters: Montreal, Canada
- Key people: Patrice Baig (general manager)
- Products: Deus Ex series; Thief series; Marvel's Guardians of the Galaxy
- Number of employees: 481 (2022)
- Parent: Eidos Interactive (2007–2009); Square Enix Limited (2009-2022); CDE Entertainment (2022–present)
- Website: eidosmontreal.com

Eidos Interactive Corporation (trade name: Eidos-Montréal) is a Canadian video game developer based in Montreal and part of Embracer Group. The studio was founded by Stéphane D'Astous in 2007 under Eidos Interactive. It became part of Square Enix Limited in 2009 and CDE Entertainment in 2022.

== History ==
Eidos Interactive announced plans to open a Montreal-based subsidiary studio in February 2007. Eidos Interactive Corp. was incorporated in March 2007. Eidos-Montréal formally opened with general manager Stéphane D'Astous on 26 November 2007. According to D'Astous, unlike other video game development studios, Eidos-Montréal's development cycle was characterized by smaller teams (totalling to 350) working over a longer period.

The same year as its founding, the studio announced to work on a Deus Ex project. In May 2009, the studio announced to work on the fourth installment of the Thief series. D'Astous resigned from Eidos-Montréal on 19 July 2013, citing irreconcilable differences with parent company Square Enix. In a 2022 interview, he retroactively called Eidos group a "trainwreck in slow motion", blaming London and Japan headquarters for failing to utilize the full potential of the studios. On 4 March 2014, Square Enix announced that 27 employees were laid off from Eidos-Montréal.

On 26 January 2017, Square Enix announced a partnership with Marvel Entertainment to create multiple video games based on Marvel properties, the first of which was announced as Avengers, based on the comics of the same name, which would be developed by Crystal Dynamics and Eidos Montreal. In May 2018, the studio had over 500 employees. In April 2018, YouTube journalist George Weidman (Super Bunnyhop) reported on a cancelled video game codenamed "Fantasy Project W" that was in development in 2012. David Anfossi, the studio head, said to PCGamesN in May that he unable to comment; he found the video "very well done" and "very funny to watch" and explained that, within the video game industry, projects are often started but eventually cancelled. In 2019, Eidos-Shanghai became part of Eidos-Montréal, a studio established in 2008 to handle outsourcing for Eidos.

In June 2020, Square Enix announced new research and development studio Eidos-Sherbrooke, led by Julien Bouvrais. It was envisioned to take advantage of the nearby Université de Sherbrooke and Bishop's University and bring in new computing technology from these schools into its games. It was said to initially operate remotely, with plans move to a permanent location in southern Quebec in 2021 and to grow from 20 to 100 staff. On 13 June 2021, during a panel for E3 2021, it was announced that the company would be developing a game based on Guardians of the Galaxy.

In May 2022, Square Enix reached an agreement with Embracer Group to purchase the studio and other assets of Square Enix Europe. During the announcement of this acquisition, it was revealed that Eidos had several projects in development, all using Unreal Engine 5. On 20 May 2022, Embracer Group (before the acquisition was complete) expressed interest in sequels, remakes and remasters in established franchises of the studio such as Deus Ex and Thief. The acquisition was completed on 26 August 2022, with the assets being held under CDE Entertainment. In November 2022, Eidos-Shanghai was detached from Eidos-Montréal and moved to Gearbox Entertainment, another Embracer Group company, as Gearbox Studio Shanghai. Eidos-Sherbrooke was closed in late January 2023.

In November 2022, Jason Schreier of Bloomberg News reported that Eidos-Montréal was in the "very very early" development stages of a new Deus Ex game. He also reported it was working in multiple projects to be published by Xbox Game Studios. In January 2024, he reported that Embracer Group had cancelled the new Deus Ex game, which had been in development for two years, as well as laid off an unspecified amount of employees. Eidos-Montréal then confirmed that 97 people were laid off. In June 2024, it was revealed that Eidos-Montréal are supporting development for the upcoming Fable. In March 2025, 75 employees were laid off. In June 2025, the studio announced to be a co-developer for Grounded 2 alongside Obsidian Entertainment. Both announcements were made during the annual Xbox Games Showcase events by Microsoft Gaming. In March 2026, Eidos-Montréal laid off 124 people, including David Anfossi.

== Technology ==
On 4 December 2014, Eidos revealed its proprietary technology called Dawn Engine which was to be used in future Deus Ex projects, first of which was later revealed to be Deus Ex: Mankind Divided. It is based on a heavily modified version of IO Interactive's Glacier 2, which has its roots in Hitman: Absolution. The engine was created after developers at Eidos-Montréal "found that [their] creative vision was somehow limited" by relying on existing engines. The graphics engine has been "almost completely" rewritten. This was done to "fully leverage the power offered by the PC and [eighth-gen] consoles". The creation of Dawn was challenging even for Eidos-Montréal's most experienced staff. The engine was later used for 2021's Marvel's Guardians of the Galaxy.

Dawn Engine features improved conversation system and cutscenes compared to Glacier 2. Built on an "entity system", Dawn allows designers to create new behaviours without the assistance of programmers. Hair technology is an improved version of AMD's TressFX, which has been developed by the in-house research and development team Labs. Dawn features systems for volumetric lighting and air density, as well as support for dense indoor and outdoor areas, and many dynamic objects. Not all objects are rendered at the same time, the engine makes use of Umbra occlusion culling. With Marvel's Guardians of the Galaxy, ray tracing and DLSS support was added, as well as working in-game mirrors.

Eidos-Montréal subsequently abandoned work with the Dawn Engine after 2022, adopting Unreal Engine 5 for its ongoing work to "focus on content" rather than technical hurdles of developing a game and its engine simultaneously. With the foundation of Eidos-Sherbrooke, research and development work was mostly offloaded to that studio including Eidos-Labs department.

== Games developed ==
Year	Title	Platform(s)	Publisher(s)	Notes	Ref.
2011	Deus Ex: Human Revolution	Mac OS X, PlayStation 3, Wii U, Windows, Xbox 360	Square Enix	Also developed the downloadable episode The Missing Link (2011)	
2013	Tomb Raider	Linux, Nvidia Shield, OS X, PlayStation 3, PlayStation 4, Stadia, Windows, Xbox 360, Xbox One	Square Enix	Supportive development for Crystal Dynamics	
2014	Thief	Nvidia Shield, OS X, PlayStation 3, PlayStation 4, Windows, Xbox 360, Xbox One	Square Enix	—N/a	
2015	Rise of the Tomb Raider	Linux, OS X, PlayStation 4, Stadia, Windows, Xbox 360, Xbox One	Microsoft Studios, Square Enix	Supportive development for Crystal Dynamics	
2016	Deus Ex: Mankind Divided	macOS, Linux, PlayStation 4, Windows, Xbox One	Feral Interactive, Square Enix	—N/a	
2018	Shadow of the Tomb Raider	macOS, Linux, PlayStation 4, Stadia, Windows, Xbox One	Square Enix	—N/a	
2020	Marvel's Avengers	PlayStation 4, PlayStation 5, Stadia, Windows, Xbox One, Xbox Series X/S	Crystal Dynamics, Square Enix	Supportive development for Crystal Dynamics	
2021	Marvel's Guardians of the Galaxy	Nintendo Switch, PlayStation 4, PlayStation 5, Windows, Xbox One, Xbox Series X/S	Square Enix	—N/a	
2026	Stage Tour	Nintendo Switch 2, PlayStation 5, Windows, Xbox Series X/S	RedOctane Games	Supportive development for RedOctane Games and Third Kind Games	
2027	Fable	PlayStation 5, Windows, Xbox Series X/S	Xbox Game Studios	Supportive development for Playground Games	
2027	Grounded 2	PlayStation 5, Windows, Xbox Series X/S	Bethesda Softworks	Co-developed with Obsidian Entertainment	

== Awards ==
Eidos-Montréal was recognized as one of the Best Places to Work by GamesIndustry.biz, and Montréal's Top Employers by Canada's Top 100 Employers competition.
