= Mary DeMarle =

American video game writer

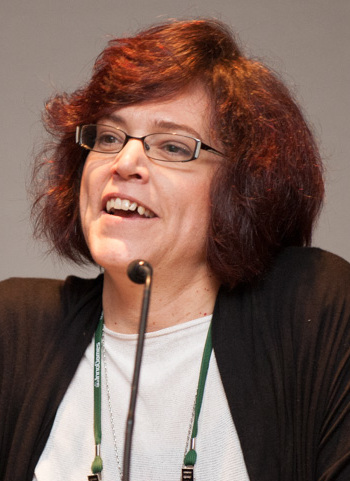
- DeMarle at Game Developers Conference Online 2012
- Occupation: Video game writer
- Years active: 1997–present
- Employer: BioWare
- Known for: Deus Ex prequels
- Title: Senior Narrative Director

Mary DeMarle is a video game writer. She is best known for her work with the Myst and Deus Ex series of games.

== Career ==
DeMarle first started her writing career working in the entertainment industry. DeMarle's first credits as a video game writer was for the 2001 game Myst III: Exile. She was the lead writer of Deus Ex: Human Revolution and its 2016 sequel Deus Ex: Mankind Divided. For the former she won the 2012 Canadian Videogame Award for Best Writing.

She was the Narrative lead for the 2021 game Marvel's Guardians of the Galaxy, which she won The Game Award for Best Narrative and the D.I.C.E. Award for Outstanding Achievement in Story.

DeMarle is known for writing for games with multiple branching narratives.

In 2022, DeMarle joined BioWare as a senior narrative director.

Year	Title	Role	Notes
2001	Myst III: Exile	Writer	
2003	Homeworld 2	Writer	
2004	Myst IV: Revelation	Writer	
2011	Deus Ex: Human Revolution	Narrative designer & lead writer	
2016	Deus Ex: Mankind Divided	Executive narrative director	
2021	Marvel's Guardians of the Galaxy	Narrative lead	

== Education ==
DeMarle has a Bachelor of Science from Syracuse University in Television, Radio, and Film Production.
