= List of Square Enix video game franchises =

Video game franchises by developer/publisher

This is a list of video game franchises by Square Enix, a Japanese video game development and publishing company formed from the merger of Enix and Square on April 1, 2003. Square Enix acquired Taito in September 2005, which continues to publish its own video games, and acquired game publisher Eidos Interactive in April 2009, which was merged with Square Enix's European publishing wing and renamed as Square Enix Europe.

Since its inception, the company has developed or published hundreds of titles in various video game franchises on numerous gaming systems. The company is best known for its role-playing video game franchises, which include the Final Fantasy, Dragon Quest, and Kingdom Hearts series. Of its properties, the Final Fantasy franchise is the best-selling, with a total worldwide sales of over 173 million units. The Dragon Quest series has sold over 85 million units worldwide and is one of the most popular video game series in Japan, while the Kingdom Hearts series has shipped over 36 million copies worldwide.

This list includes franchises in which Square Enix, or its original components Enix and Square, or its subsidiaries, were the primary developer or publisher, even if the series was begun prior to the subsidiary's acquisition. Franchises are defined as any set of interconnected media consisting of more than one release, and video game franchises are defined as franchises which were initially created as a video game or series of video games.

== Video game franchises ==
Key

Franchise primarily developed by Square, Enix, or Square Enix
† Franchise primarily developed by a subsidiary of Square, Enix, or Square Enix
* Franchise primarily published but not developed by Square, Enix, Square Enix, or their subsidiaries

Franchises
Franchise	Primary genre(s)	Number of games (Note: Games count includes remakes and games in the franchise not developed or published by Square, Enix, or Square Enix and their subsidiaries)	First released	Latest release
7th Saga*	Action role-playing, puzzle	4	1993, The 7th Saga	1999, Mystic Ark: Theatre of Illusions
ActRaiser*	Side-scroller, platformer, action role-playing	7	1990, ActRaiser	2021, Actraiser Renaissance
All Star Pro-Wrestling	Professional wrestling	3	2000, All Star Pro-Wrestling	2003, All Star Pro-Wrestling III
Arkanoid†	Breakout clone	11	1986, Arkanoid	2022, Arkanoid: Eternal Battle
Battle Gear†	Racing	13	1996, Side by Side	2006, Battle Gear 4 Tuned Professional Version
Battlestations†	Action, real-time tactics	2	2007, Battlestations: Midway	2009, Battlestations: Pacific
Birdie King†	Sports	3	1982, Birdie King	1984, Birdie King 3
Bubble Bobble†	Platformer, puzzle	18	1983, Chack'n Pop	2025, Bubble Memories Classic
Bravely Default	Role-playing	4	2012, Bravely Default	2021, Bravely Default II
Bushido Blade*	Fighting	2	1997, Bushido Blade	1998, Bushido Blade 2
Championship Manager*	Sports, simulation	25	1992, Championship Manager	2016, Championship Manager 17
Chaos Heat†	Survival horror, third-person shooter	2	1998, Chaos Heat	2000, Chaos Break -Episode from "Chaos Heat"-
Chaos Rings*	Role-playing	4	2010, Chaos Rings	2014, Chaos Rings III
Chase†	Racing	4	1988, Chase H.Q.	2007, Chase H.Q. 2
Chocobo	Role-playing, roguelike, racing	24	1997, Chocobo's Mysterious Dungeon	2022, Chocobo GP
Chrono	Role-playing	5	1995, Chrono Trigger	2022, Chrono Cross: The Radical Dreamers Edition
Cleopatra Fortune†	Puzzle	2	1996, Cleopatra Fortune	2002, Cleopatra Fortune Plus
Conflict†	Tactical shooter	5	2002, Conflict: Desert Storm	2008, Conflict: Denied Ops
Darius†	Action	23	1986, Darius	2021, Dariusburst Another Chronicle EX+
Death Trap	Interactive fiction, visual novel	3	1984, The Death Trap	1986, Alpha
Dragon Quest*	Role-playing	57	1986, Dragon Quest	2024, Dragon Quest Monsters: The Dark Prince
Drakengard*	Action role-playing	3	2003, Drakengard	2013, Drakengard 3
Dungeon Siege*	Action role-playing	3	2002, Dungeon Siege	2011, Dungeon Siege III
E. V. O.*	Role-playing, side-scroller	2	1990, E.V.O.: The Theory of Evolution	1992, E.V.O.: Search for Eden
Eclipse†	Space flight simulator	3	1994, Total Eclipse	1996, Titan Wars
Elevator Action†	Platformer	4	1983, Elevator Action	2011, Elevator Action Deluxe
Exit†	Platformer, puzzle	2	2005, Exit	2009, Exit 2
Fear Effect*	Action-adventure	3	2000, Fear Effect	2018, Fear Effect Sedna
Fighting Force†	Fighting, beat 'em up	2	1997, Fighting Force	1999, Fighting Force 2
Final Fantasy	Role-playing	100+	1987, Final Fantasy	2024, Final Fantasy VII Rebirth
Front Mission	Tactical role-playing	15	1995, Front Mission	2022, Front Mission 1st: Remake
Gangsters*	Strategy	2	1998, Gangsters: Organized Crime	2001, Gangsters 2: Vendetta
Gex†	Platformer	4	1994, Gex	1999, Gex: Deep Pocket Gecko
Groove Coaster*	Rhythm game	14	2011, Groove Coaster	2025, Groove Coaster: Future Performers
Gunslinger Stratos†	First-person shooter	5	2012, Gunslinger Stratos	2017, Gunslinger Stratos Σ
Hanjuku Hero	Real-time strategy	5	1988, Hanjuku Hero	2005, Hanjuku Galaxy Lunch
Hat Trick Hero†	Sports	3	1990, Football Champ	1995, Hat Trick Hero '95
Heimdall*	Action role-playing	2	1991, Heimdall	1994, Heimdall 2: Into the Hall of Worlds
Jesus	Visual novel, adventure game	2	1987, Jesus	1991, Jesus 2
Just Cause*	Sandbox, third-person shooter, action-adventure	4	2006, Just Cause	2018, Just Cause 4
Itadaki Street	Party game, board game	12	1991, Itadaki Street: Watashi no Omise ni Yottette	2017, Itadaki Street: Dragon Quest and Final Fantasy 30th Anniversary
Kane & Lynch*	Third-person shooter	2	2007, Kane & Lynch: Dead Men	2010, Kane & Lynch 2: Dog Days
Kingdom Hearts (Note: Kingdom Hearts is owned by The Walt Disney Company. Characters from existing Square Enix franchises are still retained by Square Enix.)	Action role-playing	13	2002, Kingdom Hearts	2020, Kingdom Hearts: Melody of Memory
Let's Go By Train†	Train simulator	18	1996, Densha de Go!	2023, Densha de Go! Plug & Play 2 Shinkansen EX
Life Is Strange*	Graphic adventure	6	2015, Life Is Strange	2024, Life Is Strange: Double Exposure
Lord of Vermilion†	Collectible card	8	2008, Lord of Vermilion	2017, Lord of Vermilion IV
Lufia*	Role-playing	5	1993, Lufia & the Fortress of Doom	2010, Lufia: Curse of the Sinistrals
Mana	Role-playing	17	1991, Final Fantasy Adventure	2024, Visions of Mana
Million Arthur*	Role-playing, collectible card	7	2012, Kaku-San-Sei Million Arthur	2023, Kai-Ri-Sei Million Arthur: Ring
Mini Ninjas*	Action-adventure	3	2009, Mini Ninjas	2013, Mini Ninjas Mobile
Musashi	Role-playing	3	1990, Adventures of Musashi	2005, Musashi: Samurai Legend
Nier*	Action role-playing	5	2010, Nier Gestalt	2021, Nier Replicant ver.1.22474487139…
Octopath Traveler	Role-playing	3	2018, Octopath Traveler	2025, Octopath Traveler 0
Ogre†	Tactical role-playing, real-time strategy	6	1993, Ogre Battle: The March of the Black Queen	2022, Tactics Ogre: Reborn
Operation Wolf†	Shooting gallery	5	1987, Operation Wolf	2023, Operation Wolf Returns: First Mission
Pandemonium†	Platformer	2	1996, Pandemonium!	1997, Pandemonium 2
Parasite Eve	Role-playing, third-person shooter	3	1998, Parasite Eve	2010, The 3rd Birthday
Pocky & Rocky†	Shooter	5	1986, KiKi KaiKai	2022, Pocky & Rocky Reshrined
Power Blade*	Action, platformer	2	1991, Power Blade	1992, Power Blade 2
Psychic Force†	Fighting	7	1995, Psychic Force	2005, Psychic Force Complete
Qix†	Puzzle	5	1981, Qix	2009, Qix++
Rakugaki Ōkoku†	Role-playing	2	2002, Magic Pengel: The Quest for Color	2004, Graffiti Kingdom
Ray†	Scrolling shooter	3	1994, RayForce	1998, RayCrisis: Series Termination
SaGa	Role-playing	15	1989, The Final Fantasy Legend	2024, SaGa: Emerald Beyond
Shellshock*	Shooter	3	1995, Shellshock: Jus' Keepin' da Peace	2009, Shellshock 2: Blood Trails
Sonic Blast Man†	Beat 'em up	5	1990, Sonic Blast Man	2011, Sonic Blast Heroes
Space Invaders†	Fixed shooter	40	1978, Space Invaders	2023, Space Invaders: World Defense
Speed Race†	Racing	15	1974, Speed Race	1998, Automobili Lamborghini: Super Speed Race 64
Star Ocean*	Role-playing	18	1996, Star Ocean	2022, Star Ocean: The Divine Force
Supreme Commander*	Real-time strategy	2	2007, Supreme Commander	2010, Supreme Commander 2
Thunderhawk†	Combat flight simulator	3	1992, Thunderhawk AH-73M	2001, Thunderhawk: Operation Phoenix
Tobal*	Fighting	2	1996, Tobal No. 1	1997, Tobal 2
Urban Chaos*	Action-adventure, first-person shooter	2	1998, Urban Chaos	2006, Urban Chaos: Riot Response
Valkyrie Profile*	Role-playing	5	1999, Valkyrie Profile	2022, Valkyrie Elysium
Wonder Project*	Life simulation	2	1994, Wonder Project J	1996, Wonder Project J2
World Ends With You	Action role-playing game	2	2007, The World Ends with You	2021, Neo: The World Ends with You
Yuji Horii Mysteries	Visual novel, adventure game	2	1983, The Portopia Serial Murder Case	1985, The Karuizawa Kidnapping Guide

=== Former franchises ===
Former franchises
Franchise	Primary genre(s)	Number of games (Note: Games count includes remakes and games in the franchise not developed or published by Square, Enix, or Square Enix and their subsidiaries)	First released	Last published by Square Enix
Deus Ex†	Real-time tactics, first-person shooter	7	2000, Deus Ex	2017, Deus Ex: Mankind Divided – VR Experience
Hitman†	Stealth, action-adventure	15	2000, Hitman: Codename 47	2006, Hitman: Blood Money - Reprisal
Legacy of Kain†	Action-adventure	6	1996, Blood Omen: Legacy of Kain	2024, Legacy of Kain: Soul Reaver 1 & 2 Remastered
Thief†	Stealth, action-adventure	4	1998, Thief: The Dark Project	2014, Thief
Tomb Raider†	Action-adventure	23	1996, Tomb Raider	2024, Tomb Raider I–III Remastered

== See also ==
- List of Gangan Comics manga franchises
- List of Square Enix video games
- List of Square Enix mobile games
- List of Taito games
