= Adam Marcus =

Adam Marcus may refer to:

- Adam Marcus (director) (born 1968), American film director, writer and actor
- Adam Marcus (mathematician) (born 1979), American mathematician
- Adam "Kane" Marcus, a character in the video games Kane & Lynch: Dead Men and Kane & Lynch 2: Dog Days

== See also ==
- Marcus Adam (born 1968), retired English sportsperson
