= Hitman: Codename 47 =

2000 video game

- Developer: IO Interactive
- Publisher: Eidos Interactive
- Writers: Peter Gjellerup Koch; Morten Iversen
- Composer: Jesper Kyd
- Series: Hitman
- Engine: Glacier
- Platform: Microsoft Windows
- Release: NA: 19 November 2000; EU: 1 December 2000
- Genre: Stealth
- Mode: Single-player

Hitman: Codename 47 is a stealth video game developed by IO Interactive and published by Eidos Interactive exclusively for Microsoft Windows in November 2000. It is the first entry in the Hitman series. The player controls Agent 47, a genetically enhanced human clone who is rigorously trained in methods of murder. Upon escaping from his testing facility, 47 is hired by the International Contract Agency (ICA), a global contract killing organization. His missions take him to locations in Asia, Europe, and South America to assassinate wealthy and decadent criminals, at first seeming to share no connections with each other (beyond passing mentions to the service of each in the French Foreign Legion), but who are soon revealed to have all played a role in a larger conspiracy. The gameplay revolves around finding ways to stealthily reach and eliminate each target; to this end, players can make use of various tools, including disguises and suppressed weaponry. However, some levels are more action-focused and do not feature stealth as a possibility, instead playing like a traditional third-person shooter.

Codename 47 received mixed reviews from critics, who praised the unique approach to stealth gameplay, considered revolutionary at the time, but criticised its difficulty, controls, and technical issues. It sold over 500,000 units by 2009. The game went on to launch the Hitman video game franchise, beginning with the first sequel, Hitman 2: Silent Assassin, in 2002.

== Gameplay ==
Hitman: Codename 47 is presented from the third-person perspective, but the control setup is similar to a first-person shooter as 47's movements are restricted to turning, strafing and moving forward and backward. Each level takes place in a semi-open world environment which is populated with non-player characters such as civilians and armed guards. Although mission criteria may vary, the goal is generally to find 47's assigned target and kill them by any means possible. Though the path may appear linear, it is possible through various ways to accomplish the mission and approach a target directly without eliciting a violent reprisal. The game essentially emphasises stealth and silent kills without raising alerts, giving the player a higher financial reward for doing so. Penalties in the form of financial deductions are given, for example if the player kills civilians, but none of the guards or other enemies are slain. As the money is used to purchase weapons and ammo during the course of the game, this pressures the player to utilise stealth, disguise, and melee based mechanics for the most cost-effective method to take out targets.

The player can peek around corners by using the lean function, which prompts 47 to tilt slightly to one side. 47 is able to climb ladders, but cannot defend himself with a weapon while doing so. In addition, he is only able to jump from one balcony to another. There is an on-screen cursor to indicate in which direction 47 will attack. The heads-up display includes a life bar which measures 47's health, ammo capacity, kevlar durability, and the current item selected. Alert messages sometimes appear next to the health readout. These occur whenever enemies discover a body on the map, or if 47 falls under suspicion. 47's weaponry consists of various short and long-range firearms, a garrote wire, and a knife. Handguns generally have excellent range, while automatic rifles and machine guns decrease in accuracy the farther away 47 is from his target. 47 can also equip himself with a sniper rifle, including one concealed in a special suitcase, which must be reassembled before he may use it. Once he is finished with the rifle, 47 can take it apart and place it in the suitcase once more.

Disguise plays a large role in gameplay. Any time a male non-player character is killed – aside from targets and some unique characters – 47 may take their clothes and impersonate them. This is necessary to access restricted areas where only guards may enter. At the start of each level, 47 begins in a default costume. This costume is his trademark suit and red tie which is folded and left on the ground whenever 47 changes clothes. The player may replace 47's outfit with a previous one by simply approaching them and selecting the option to change. If anyone on the map spots a body lying on the ground, it will create unwanted attention for 47, such as base alarms, calls for back-up, and reports to their boss, usually the target. In the event that 47 adopted the clothes of someone he has slain, his disguise will be compromised as soon as the body is discovered. 47 creates sound while walking which will alert any hostile characters in the facility. To move without being detected, the player can use the sneak function, which causes 47 to crouch and move in a stalking manner. Sneaking also allows 47 to retrieve a weapon from his inventory without anyone hearing it; if 47 is standing upright when the player pulls out a weapon, it will alert nearby characters. Characters who are dead may be dragged at any time. When dragging, 47 lifts up the closest available leg or arm and begins to hoist it away as movement is directed by the player. Naturally, being spotting dragging a dead body also garners unwanted attention.

== Plot ==
The game opens in 1999, as a mysterious man code-named "Project 47" awakens in the basement of a sanatorium to an unidentified man talking over a loudspeaker. Under the man's guidance, 47 completes a training course that tests his athletic, firearms, and assassination skills, before killing the guards and escaping from the sanatorium, much to his observer's joy. A year later, 47 has joined the International Contract Agency (ICA) – a global organization that specializes in performing assassinations for various clients – and has been assigned the identity of "Agent 47" and a handler, Diana Burnwood. It is not explained precisely how his recruitment took place. (Note: 47's recruitment is later depicted in Hitman (2016).)

Over the course of the year, 47 completes contracts that see him killing Triad crime boss Lee Hong in Hong Kong, after weakening his position by provoking a gang war; cocaine trafficker Pablo Belisario Ochoa in Colombia, through a staged drug raid; Austrian mercenary Frantz Fuchs in Budapest, who was planning to detonate a bomb during an international conference; and Kazakh gunrunner Arkadij Jegorov in Rotterdam, who was paranoid about the imminent arrival of 47 and had activated a nuclear warhead on his ship. After each successful assassination, 47 finds letters on his targets talking about himself, a project about an "experimental human", and a man named Professor Ort-Meyer.

The target details in each assassination mission briefing noted that all four targets served in the French Foreign Legion. Diana soon contacts 47 with news that they all in fact served in the same FFL unit in Vietnam during the First Indochina War, and that the assassinations were requested by the same client, which goes against the ICA's rules. 47 is then sent on a final mission: to assassinate a doctor in a sanatorium in Romania, which he recognizes as the same facility he escaped from a year prior. As Romanian special forces raid the building, 47 eliminates the target, whom he recognizes as Ort-Meyer's assistant, and discovers the truth of his existence: he is the product of a cloning experiment that combined the DNA of Ort-Meyer, Hong, Ochoa, Fuchs, and Jegorov to create the perfect assassin.

With the help of a fairly inept CIA agent named Carlton Smith, whom he had first encountered and rescued in Hong Kong, 47 locates Ort-Meyer in a hidden lab under the sanatorium. He learns that the professor orchestrated his escape a year prior to test his performance in the real world, and arranged his former partners' deaths because they each wanted 47 for themselves. Ort-Meyer then reveals that he has since created more skilled and easier to control clones, dubbed "Subjects 48", and dispatches them to kill 47. After killing all the clones with his superior training, 47 poses as one of them to reach Ort-Meyer, shooting him when the latter realizes the deception. Before dying, Ort-Meyer regrets that he was unable to recognize "his own son" and accepts his death at 47's hands, who proceeds to snap his neck.

== Development ==
Hitman: Codename 47 was created by Danish developer IO Interactive. Early on, the team conceptualised a fantasy massively multiplayer online game (MMO) entitled Rex Dominus; however, Danish film studio Nordisk Film, which IO Interactive was partnered with at the time, asked the team to cease production on Rex Dominus and "test [themselves]" by developing a "simple shooter" instead. As such, the team opted for a run-and-gun action game, as it took less time to develop compared to an MMO, drawing inspiration from John Woo films, such as Hard Boiled and The Killer. They turned to develop for personal computers (PCs), because they were unable to acquire development kits for consoles, and had also found interest in the steady increase of PCs' 3D graphics capabilities.

A part of the development on the game, which would later become Hitman: Codename 47, was the creation of the Glacier, the studio's proprietary game engine that fit their needs; co-founder Andersen stated: "Since killing was the main theme of the game, we wanted to do something special. [...] Standard 'death animations' just looked too static so some of the coders tried to see if they could use real-time inverse kinematics for the falling bodies. The first versions ran terribly slowly until one of the programmers figured out a way to fake the whole calculation." This led to the first use of advanced ragdoll physics in a video game. This physics system caught the eyes of British publisher Eidos Interactive, and especially staff member Jonas Eneroth, who thought that the system could greatly benefit Codename 47's gameplay. Following six months of negotiations, a publishing deal was signed between IO Interactive and Eidos Interactive. Eneroth became executive producer on the project.

As executive producer, Eneroth encouraged the development team to stray away from the run-and-gun gameplay, and instead focus on a "methodical experience", including dragging dead bodies around the scene to create tension. He had previously worked on Deus Ex and Thief: The Dark Project, which had heavily exposed him to the stealth game mechanics he wished to see in Codename 47.

Jesper Kyd composed the game's soundtrack, basing it on urban soundscapes and ethnic instrumentation. Kyd had previously been a member of IO Interactive's precursor, Zyrinx, but moved to Manhattan and became a freelance video game musician. He would subsequently return to compose the soundtracks of the first three sequels to Codename 47: Silent Assassin, Contracts, and Blood Money.

== Reception ==
Reception

Aggregate score
Aggregator	Score
Metacritic	73/100

Review scores
Publication	Score
CNET Gamecenter	6/10
Computer Games Strategy Plus	2/5
Computer Gaming World	2.5/5
Edge	5/10
EP Daily	9.5/10
Eurogamer	8/10
Game Informer	6.75/10
GameRevolution	B
GameSpot	5.2/10
GameSpy	80%
IGN	7.5/10
Next Generation	3/5
PC Gamer (US)	75%
X-Play	4/5

Hitman: Codename 47 received "mixed or average reviews" according to the review aggregation website Metacritic. Jim Preston of NextGen called it "A deeply flawed masterpiece that will, nonetheless, reward forgiving gamers." Jake The Snake of GamePro said, "Though Rambo wannabes will feel pinned down by the game's realism, this captivating title oozes with enough seedy atmosphere and tense action to satisfy the most jaded gamer." (Note: GamePro gave the game two 4.5/5 scores for graphics and fun factor, and two 4/5 scores for sound and control.) Michael Lafferty of GameZone gave it seven out of ten, saying that "The violence is a little excessive."

The game received a "Silver" sales award from the Entertainment and Leisure Software Publishers Association (ELSPA), indicating sales of at least 100,000 units in the UK. In April 2009, Square Enix revealed that Hitman had surpassed half a million sales globally.
