= Agent 47 =

Hitman character

- Hitman character
- Agent 47 in Hitman: Absolution (2012)
- First appearance: Hitman: Codename 47 (2000)
- Created by: IO Interactive
- Designed by: Jacob Andersen
- Voiced by: David Bateson
- Portrayed by: Various: Timothy Olyphant (Hitman); Borislav Parvanov (Hitman, young); Rupert Friend (Hitman: Agent 47); Jesse Hergt (Hitman: Agent 47, young)

In-universe information
- Species: Human (clone)
- Weapon: AMT Hardballer
- Origin: Romania

Agent 47 is a fictional character and the player character of the Hitman stealth game franchise created and developed by IO Interactive. He has been featured in all games of the series, as well as various spin-off media, including two theatrically released films, a series of comics, and two novels. He has been voiced by actor David Bateson in every main entry in the series since its inception in 2000.

The player controls 47, a monotone contract killer without empathy, as he travels around the world to execute hits on various criminals that are assigned to him by Diana Burnwood, his handler within the fictional International Contract Agency (ICA). The character takes his name from being the 47th clone created by various wealthy criminals from around the world, in the hopes of creating an army of obedient soldiers to carry out their commands. As one of the last clones to be created, 47 is among the most skillful, and manages to escape his creators before finding employment with the ICA. When his name is asked, he typically goes by the alias Tobias Rieper.

Agent 47 has been positively received by critics for his moral ambiguity and nuanced characterization, and has been compared positively to fellow stealth-action protagonists like Solid Snake, Lara Croft, and Sam Fisher.

== Concept and creation ==
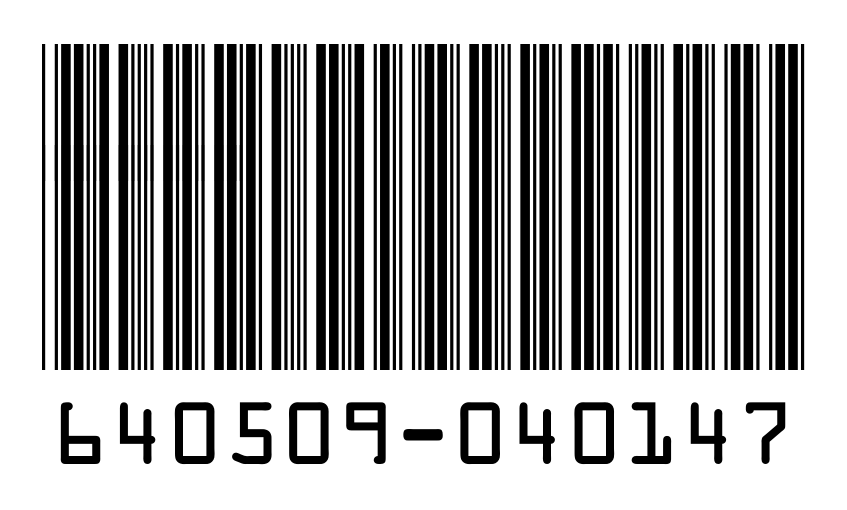
47's barcode as based on images from Dr. Ort-Meyer's journal

Agent 47 was originally created for Hitman: Codename 47 (2000). He went through multiple revisions, including "a mean old hairy guy" to having "hi-tech glasses," before they settled on his final design. He is a bald man with a tattoo on the back of his head in the style of a barcode. This was added to give players something to look at while they played, with the in-game lore being that he needed to be distinguishable from clones of him. He is monotone and lacks empathy. His name comes from the fact that he is the 47th clone created.

Agent 47 is typically seen wearing a black suit, black leather gloves and shoes, and a burgundy tie, though he can change his outfit during gameplay. More inspiration came from comic books, Hong Kong films, and similar media. The idea of a clone whose future is decided by the people that created him intrigued the Hitman team. The idea of creating the "ultimate assassin" by cloning evolved with the character before the first game was completed. Agent 47 is voiced in the video game series by David Bateson, who was the basis for his appearance.

== Appearances ==
=== Hitman series ===
Agent 47 is introduced in Hitman: Codename 47 (2000) as a mysterious patient of a sanatorium in Romania who escapes and is subsequently recruited by the International Contract Agency (ICA) as an assassin. Over the course of the game, 47 travels to Hong Kong, Colombia, Budapest, and Rotterdam to eliminate four seemingly unrelated targets. His final mission takes him back to the Romanian sanatorium, where he discovers the truth about his origins: he is a genetically engineered clone and all of his previous targets were his genetic donors, or "fathers", who gave their DNA to be cloned in the hopes of creating an army of obedient and highly-skilled soldiers. At the game's climax, 47 comes face-to-face with his creator and final genetic donor, Professor Ort-Meyer, who unleashes an army of clones dubbed "No. 48s" to eliminate 47. 47 defeats the clones, then confronts and kills Ort-Meyer.

In the sequel Hitman 2: Silent Assassin (2002), 47 has retired from his career as a contract killer and is leading a simple life as a gardener at a Sicilian church, trying to reconcile with his troubled past. After his new mentor, the Reverend Emilio Vittorio, is kidnapped, 47 reluctantly returns to the ICA, who hire him to assassinate more targets across the globe in exchange for their help in tracking down Vittorio. Over the course of the game, 47 uncovers a conspiracy involving the sale of a nuclear warhead, masterminded by Sergei Zavorotko, the brother of one of 47's genetic donors. Sergei orchestrated Vittorio's kidnapping to lure 47 out of retirement, so that he would eliminate everyone involved with the sale. After learning Sergei has taken Vittorio back to his church, 47 kills the former and rescues Vittorio, then returns to work for the ICA full-time, believing he will never be able to have a peaceful life.

In Hitman: Contracts (2004), after being near-fatally injured during a mission in Paris, 47 recovers at his hotel room while experiencing flashbacks of his past contracts. He then eliminates his target, who was warned that 47 was coming beforehand by a rival contract killing organization called the Franchise. This leads into the events of Hitman: Blood Money (2006), where 47 and his handler, Diana Burnwood, attempt to stop the Franchise from purging the ICA and acquiring the cloning technology that created 47. After the ICA is wiped out with the exception of 47 and Diana, the latter helps the former fake his death and eliminates the Franchise's leader who comes to attend his funeral. With the Franchise dismantled, Diana steals their resources and uses them to restart the ICA.

In Hitman: Absolution (2012), 47 is tasked by Diana, who has seemingly betrayed the ICA, with protecting a genetically enhanced teenage girl named Victoria, whom the ICA and other factions seek to use for their own gain. 47 slowly bonds with Victoria over their similar backgrounds, and eventually eliminates weapons tycoon Blake Dexter and ICA operative Benjamin Travis, to prevent Victoria from falling into their hands. It is then revealed that Travis was acting without his superiors' knowledge, allowing 47 and Diana to resume working for the ICA while the latter looks after Victoria.

In the World of Assassination trilogy—consisting of Hitman (2016), Hitman 2 (2018), and Hitman 3 (2021)—47 and Diana uncover the existence of Providence, a secret organization controlling global affairs. Providence and the ICA form an uneasy alliance to find and eliminate the "Shadow Client", a mysterious individual targeting Providence for unknown reasons, as his actions are causing global panic. 47 eventually discovers the Shadow Client's identity to be Lucas Grey, formerly known as Subject 6, a fellow clone created by Ort-Meyer and his childhood best friend. Grey helps 47 recover his memories erased by Providence, who were involved in their creation, and convinces him to join forces to dismantle Providence as revenge for turning them into assassins against their will. 47 and Grey eventually eliminate Providence's leaders, but this allows their second-in-command, Arthur Edwards, to take over. Edwards has Grey killed and attempts to turn Diana against 47 by revealing that the latter, while working as a brainwashed assassin for Providence, had killed Diana's parents. After fending off ICA agents sent to kill him, 47 causes a data leak in ICA's Chongqing facility, which destroys the agency. Diana seemingly betrays 47 and helps Edwards capture him, but this allows 47 to either assassinate Edwards or erase his memories. Diana then takes over Providence and dismantles it, before she and 47 reunite and continue to take on various assassination contracts together, now working freelance.

=== In other media ===
Aside from his video game appearances, Agent 47 is featured in two live-actions films. Timothy Olyphant stars as the character in 2007's Hitman, while Rupert Friend portrays 47 in the 2015 reboot Hitman: Agent 47.

In literature, 47 has appeared in two novels: Hitman: Enemy Within (2007) by William C. Dietz, which bridges the gap between Hitman 2: Silent Assassin and Blood Money and explores more of 47's past, and Hitman: Damnation (2012) by Raymond Benson, a tie-in and prequel to Absolution. From November 2017 to June 2018, Dynamite Entertainment published a six-issue comic book miniseries titled Agent 47: Birth of the Hitman. The comic explores both 47 and Diana Burnwood's pasts prior to joining the ICA.

== Reception ==
Agent 47 has been praised for his moral ambiguity and nuanced characterization. In 2012, GamesRadar+ ranked Agent 47 as the 47th "most memorable, influential, and badass" protagonist in video games. Alongside other gaming characters with similar traits, such as Lara Croft, Sam Fisher and Solid Snake, he is considered one of the most popular and significant characters in video games. He is regarded by GamesRadar+, FHM, The Telegraph, Play, and G4 as one of the best assassins in video games. IGN ranked him as gaming's fourth "most notorious" anti-hero, while The Telegraph ranked him third on their list of top 10 video game anti-heroes. Complex ranked him as the 5th "best assassin and hitman in video games", noting him as the "original contract killer", while also praising his outfit as "stylish". Empire ranked him as the 21st "greatest video game character", stating that his design was "striking". Rolling Stone ranked Agent 47 among the most iconic video game characters of the 21st century. In 2024, a poll conducted by BAFTA with around 4,000 respondents named Agent 47 as the third most iconic video-game character of all time, only behind Lara Croft and Mario.
