= Eneroth =

Eneroth is a surname. Notable people with the surname include:

- Tomas Eneroth (born 1966), Swedish politician
- Jonas Eneroth (fl. 1995), Swedish video game producer

== See also ==
- Jhonas Enroth (born 1988), Swedish ice hockey goaltender
