= Hitman 2: Silent Assassin =

2002 video game

- Developer: IO Interactive
- Publisher: Eidos Interactive (Note: Square Enix Europe published the Xbox 360 and PlayStation 3 versions.)
- Writer: Morten Iversen
- Composer: Jesper Kyd
- Series: Hitman
- Engine: Glacier
- Platforms: PlayStation 2; Windows; Xbox; GameCube; PlayStation 3; Xbox 360
- Release: PlayStation 2, Windows, Xbox: NA: 1 October 2002; EU: 4 October 2002; AU: 18 October 2002; GameCube: NA: 17 June 2003; PAL: 27 June 2003 PlayStation 3, Xbox 360; NA: 29 January 2013; PAL: 1 February 2013
- Genre: Stealth
- Mode: Single-player

Hitman 2: Silent Assassin is a 2002 stealth video game developed by IO Interactive and published by Eidos Interactive for Microsoft Windows, PlayStation 2, Xbox and GameCube. The game was re-released for Windows through the Steam online distribution service, and a DRM-free version was later made available through GOG.com. It is the second installment in the Hitman video game series and the sequel to Hitman: Codename 47 (2000). The single-player story once again follows Agent 47, a genetically enhanced human clone who worked for the International Contract Agency (ICA) as an assassin. Following the events of Codename 47, the former contract killer has retired and started a peaceful life at a church, but after his only friend, Reverend Emilio Vittorio, is kidnapped by unknown assailants, 47 resumes work for the ICA in hopes of tracking him down.

Like its predecessor, gameplay focuses on eliminating targets while trying to remain undetected for as long as possible, may it be by taking disguises, avoiding suspicious enemies, or other means. The more action-focused segments from Codename 47 have been removed in favor of entirely stealth-focused missions, though players are free to choose their own style of gameplay. The game introduces the option for a first-person view, the ability to incapacitate enemies instead of killing them, and missions with multiple possible approaches.

Silent Assassin received generally positive reviews from critics, who considered it to be an improvement over its predecessor in every respect. The game was also a commercial success, having sold more than 3.7 million copies as of 23 April 2009, which makes it the best-selling Hitman game in the original series (prior to 2016's Hitman). High-definition ports of Silent Assassin and its successors, Contracts (2004) and Blood Money (2006), were released on PlayStation 3 and Xbox 360 in January 2013 in the form of the Hitman HD Trilogy.

== Gameplay ==
Agent 47 wearing a guard's clothes after knocking him down

Hitman 2 features mission-based gameplay and is presented from the third-person perspective, which can optionally be switched to a first-person view. On each level, the main character, a contract killer named Agent 47, is given a set of objectives to complete. Most levels require the assassination of one or more people. The way through which the missions are to be completed is up to the player, and there are often a variety of ways to complete missions. Instead of taking an action-oriented, aggressive approach, one can also set traps, like poisoning a drink, to terminate the target in silence. Some missions have assassination possibilities unique to the level.

Agent 47 can find disguises or remove them from an incapacitated person to blend in with his surroundings and access restricted areas. This plays in with the "suspicion" system; a bar beside the health meter on the HUD represents how much suspicion the player garners. There are multiple ways to blend in more effectively; for example, the player can make sure to carry an AK-47 assault rifle while disguised as a Russian soldier. Despite the usage of a uniform, being too near to fellow guards will increase the suspicion as they would have an opportunity to more closely examine Agent 47. Running, climbing and being in restricted places are other ways to garner concern.

Agent 47's cover can be blown if suspicion gets too high, and the disguise will no longer be of any use. It is possible to switch between multiple disguises throughout the level.

Hitman 2 uses the concept of a post-mission ranking system, in which the player is given a status based on how they completed the mission, rated along a stealthy-aggressive axis, between "Silent Assassin", a stealthy player who manages to complete the level without being noticed and only killing two non-targeting people excluding the intended target(s), and "Mass Murderer", a non-stealthy player who kills everyone. The game rewards the player for critical thinking and problem solving, encouraging the player not to treat the game as a simple shooter. Achieving "Silent Assassin" status on multiple missions rewards the player with bonus weapons. These weapons, plus items found in previous levels, can be carried over into future ones, allowing for differing means of accomplishing the tasks. Big weapons like rifles and shotguns cannot be concealed, thus the player has to either be wearing an appropriate disguise to match the weapon, or make sure no one sees the player use it.

== Plot ==
Following the events of Hitman: Codename 47 (2000), two men investigate the massacre left by Agent 47 at the facility of his creator, Dr. Ort-Meyer, in Romania. One of them recognizes the former assassin on video footage of the events, and decides that they must "hire" him. Meanwhile, 47, having retired after erasing all evidence of his existence, leads a new life as a humble gardener at a Sicilian church owned by the Reverend Emilio Vittorio. One day, after 47 attends confession to ask for forgiveness for his past, a group of unknown men arrive at the church and abduct Vittorio, leaving behind a ransom note demanding $500,000.

Unable to pay such a sum, 47 contacts his former employers, the International Contract Agency (ICA), for assistance. The organisation agrees to help in exchange for 47 returning to complete several contracts for them. Although he learns that the abduction was conducted by the local Mafia and kills the person who handled it, 47 is unable to find Vittorio, and is left to repay his debt to the ICA. His missions take him to various locations in Russia, Japan, Malaysia, Afghanistan and India, and each require collecting an important item for his client. In time, he eventually gives up his search for Vittorio, who he assumes is dead.

After eliminating his last target, Agent 47 is informed by the ICA that Vittorio's kidnapping was orchestrated by Sergei Zavorotko, the brother of Arkadij Jegorov (one of 47's five genetic donors and targets from the first game), in order to lure 47 out of retirement. In addition, he learns that all the targets were connected to the sale of a nuclear warhead to Sergei, who needed them eliminated in order to conceal the fact that he intended to arm the warheads to missiles that possessed software which would disguise them as American-made, therefore bypassing the American missile defense system, and sell them to interested parties. 47 pursues Sergei, who has taken Vittorio back to his church, and kills him and his men. Concerned for his soul, Vittorio begs 47 to renounce his path of violence and lead a good life, handing him his rosary. Unable to find inner peace, however, Agent 47 leaves the rosary on the church's door, and formally returns to the ICA.

== Development ==
One of the major complaints critics made about the first game was that it was inaccessible to most players due to its unfriendly nature, featuring difficult gameplay and a broken checkpoint system. Improvements were made to the game's AI and many levels were made smaller and more focused. Additional items would be available in the second installment, including chloroform for quietly taking down enemies and a crossbow which could silently kill opponents. The initial story for the game would take place after the events of the first game. After hearing the changes planned for Hitman 2, PC Gamer declared in December 2001 that "Hitman 2 should be everything we wished of its predecessor – and that gives us extremely high hopes."

== Reception ==
Reception

Aggregate score
Aggregator	Score
Metacritic	(GC) 83/100 (PC) 87/100 (PS2) 85/100 (Xbox) 84/100

Review scores
Publication	Score
Electronic Gaming Monthly	7/8/8.5/10
Eurogamer	7/10
GameSpot	8.6/10
IGN	8.7/10

Hitman 2: Silent Assassin received "generally positive" reviews, according to review aggregator platform Metacritic. GameSpot gave it a score of 8.6/10, saying that it "fixes virtually all of the problems of its predecessor" and is still an "outstanding" game. Electronic Gaming Monthly scored Hitman 2's GameCube version 7/8/8.5: the first reviewer criticized its artificial intelligence and mission briefings, but said that "each time I circumvented the immeasurable odds and made the crucial killing blow, Hitman 2 was briefly a blast"; the third reviewer summarized it as "an engaging adventure title that rewards patient players".

Despite the 7/8/8.5 scores given by Electronic Gaming Monthly, the cover of the GameCube release says "9/10 Electronic Gaming Monthly Gold Award". This score is erroneously taken from the magazine's review of the PlayStation 2 version. When confronted with the issue by Electronic Gaming Monthly, Eidos said it would remove the score in future printings.

Hitman 2 has sold more than 3.7 million copies as of 23 April 2009. By July 2006, the PlayStation 2 version of Hitman 2 had sold 1.1 million copies and earned $39 million in the United States. Next Generation ranked it as the 47th-highest-selling game launched for the PlayStation 2, Xbox or GameCube between January 2000 and July 2006 in that country. Combined console sales of Hitman games released in the 2000s reached 2 million units in the United States by July 2006. Hitman 2's PC and Xbox releases each received a "Silver" sales award from the Entertainment and Leisure Software Publishers Association (ELSPA), indicating sales of at least 100,000 copies per version in the United Kingdom. ELSPA gave the game's PlayStation 2 release a "Platinum" certification for sales of at least 300,000 copies in the region.

Hitman 2 was nominated for Computer Gaming World's 2002 "Action Game of the Year" award, which ultimately went to Medal of Honor: Allied Assault. The editors wrote, "Hitman 2 is a huge improvement over the original, and it's one of the best games of last year in any genre." GameSpot presented the game with its annual "Most Improved Sequel on PC" award. It was also nominated for GameSpot's "Best Music on PC", "Best Single-Player Action Game on PC", "Best Music on Xbox", "Best Sound on PlayStation 2", "Best Music on PlayStation 2" and "Best Action Adventure Game on Xbox" prizes. During the 6th Annual Interactive Achievement Awards, the Academy of Interactive Arts & Sciences nominated Hitman 2 for "Console Action/Adventure Game of the Year".

The game's release sparked controversy due to a level featuring the killing of Sikhs within a depiction of one of their most holy sites, the Golden Temple, a gurdwara where hundreds of Sikhs were massacred in 1984. In response, the level was edited from the Microsoft Windows and GameCube versions of Silent Assassin, removing all Sikh-related references.
