= Freedom Fighters (video game) =

2003 video game

- North American cover art by Alex Maleev
- Developer: IO Interactive
- Publisher: EA Games (Note: The 2020 digital re-release was published by IO Interactive.)
- Writer: Morten Iversen
- Composer: Jesper Kyd
- Engine: Glacier
- Platforms: GameCube; PlayStation 2; Windows; Xbox
- Release: AU: September 25, 2003; EU: September 26, 2003; NA: October 1, 2003; Re-release: WW: September 21, 2020
- Genre: Third-person shooter
- Modes: Single-player, multiplayer

Freedom Fighters is a 2003 third-person shooter video game for the PlayStation 2, GameCube, Xbox, and Windows. It was developed by IO Interactive and published by EA Games.

The game is set in an alternate history in which the Soviet Union has invaded and occupied New York City. The player takes the role of Christopher Stone, a plumber turned resistance movement leader, fighting against the invaders in Manhattan, Brooklyn, and on Governors Island.

The Windows version of the game was re-released digitally on September 21, 2020, by IO Interactive on Steam, GOG.com, and Epic Games Store. Included in the purchase of the re-release is the full "Official Freedom Fighters soundtrack" together with two bonus tracks that were never included in the game.

== Gameplay ==
Freedom Fighters is a third-person shooter, in which the player navigates through the streets of New York with a controllable squad of teammates while fighting the occupying Soviet forces, though some missions are solo. The player gains charisma points by performing various deeds, such as capturing a base or destroying enemy supplies. The more charisma gained, the more squad mates the character can recruit, up to a maximum of twelve. The player can direct recruits by giving them simple orders such as "follow", "attack", and "defend".

=== Multiplayer ===
The console versions' multiplayer revolves around securing flags and bunkers. The flag is usually in the center of the map. Bunkers are positioned around the map, and spawn either Soviet soldiers or American freedom fighters. A game can host up to four players via split-screen who may choose between the Soviet and American sides. Each side has a different set of weapons which the players can switch during battle. The players' charisma meters are set to eight, so each player can have a maximum of eight soldiers under their command; however, if it is a four-player battle, each player can control a maximum of four soldiers. The Windows version does not support multiplayer.

== Plot ==
The Soviet Union became a world superpower by dropping the first atomic bomb on Berlin in Germany, ending World War II, and propping up communist states throughout the globe which begin to surround the US in the present day. New York plumbing brothers Chris and Troy Stone travel to meet with their next client, an activist named Isabella Angelina (Vanessa Marshall), only to find her apartment abandoned. The Soviet Union launches a surprise invasion of New York City and suddenly Soviet soldiers, led by General Vasilij Tatarin, seize Troy. Amidst the attack, Chris escapes to the streets, encountering a man named Mr. Jones (Nicholas Worth) and resistance member Phil Bagzton and Dihn "The Kid" Nguyen (Walter Emanuel Jones). After rescuing Isabella from a police station and Troy from a post office, the group retreats to the sewers and sets up a base of operations as New York is lost, with the media now being controlled by the Soviet Union.

Months later, Chris, Phil, and Isabella sabotage key Soviet facilities and reclaim areas within the city, building up a resistance group of New York citizens and disillusioned Soviet soldiers. Chris becomes known as the "Freedom Phantom" within the Soviet-controlled media network, SAFN. Troy is captured by Soviet troops and tortured for information. Forced into issuing a public statement aimed at the resistance to cease their actions, he breaks from the prepared text and urges Chris to continue fighting. In response, General Tatarin has Troy taken to Fort Jay and executes him personally. Mr. Jones suggests assassinating Tatarin in retaliation. Chris succeeds, but returns to find Isabella missing and the resistance base occupied by the Soviet Army. The operation was orchestrated by Mr. Jones who reveals himself to be KGB agent Colonel Mikael Bulba. It is revealed that his purpose for helping the Resistance the whole time was to kill Tatarin and take his rank. Chris escapes with Phil and others to a new underground area while SAFN reports on the death of Tatarin, Colonel Bulba's promotion to General, and the "end" of the resistance in New York.

During the winter, Chris leads the resistance deeper into occupied New York, culminating with a major raid on SAFN Studios. Chris uses the station to send a broadcast encouraging the city and beyond to rise up and bring an end to the Soviet occupation. A final assault on Governors Island, consisting of massed resistance forces, is planned and carried out, capturing key objectives against extremely heavy Soviet resistance. Realizing he has lost, Bulba angrily leaves New York in a helicopter while lamenting that demotion is inevitable for him because of this failure. After capturing Fort Jay and rescuing Isabella, New York is liberated for the time being as Chris and the group solemnly celebrate their victory. Chris knows the Soviets will not give up the occupied United States easily, but resolves to fight on as long as is necessary.

== Development ==
In 2002, EA Games officially announced Freedom: The Battle for Liberty Island, which would later be renamed Freedom Fighters, at the E3. The concept for the game originally involved a turn-based strategic mode as a major element of gameplay. Developed using the Glacier 3D engine, Freedom Fighters was released in Australia and New Zealand on September 25 and in the United Kingdom on September 26. In North America, the release was delayed by one week to October 1 at the request of retailers in the region.

=== Audio ===
The Freedom Fighters original soundtrack was composed by Danish composer Jesper Kyd and released on September 29, 2003, by Sumthing Else Music Works and Nano Studios.

Tracks 1, 2, 3, 9, 10, 14 and 16 feature the Hungarian Radio Choir, with Russian lyrics written by Gaelle Obiegly.

No.	Title	Length
1.	"Main title"	5:02
2.	"Invasion of the Empire"	0:56
3.	"March of the Empire"	5:12
4.	"Isabella – Leader of the Resistance"	4:47
5.	"Betrayal at Rebel Base"	1:53
6.	"The Battle for Freedom"	4:07
7.	"Nightfall"	3:53
8.	"Flag of Freedom"	1:03
9.	"Freedom Fighters"	5:11
10.	"Choir of Liberty"	0:37
11.	"Rebel Base"	4:18
12.	"Infiltrator"	4:51
13.	"Sabotage"	5:52
14.	"Snow Battle"	3:08
15.	"Governor's Island"	3:56
16.	"Final Battle"	4:01
17.	"Zero Hour (Bonus Track)"	4:36
18.	"Flag of Freedom (Original Version)"	2:04
Total length:		60:05

== Reception ==
Reception

Aggregate scores
Aggregator	Score
GameRankings	(PS2) 83.92% (XBOX) 81.81% (GC) 83.48% (PC) 81.55%
Metacritic	(PS2) 81/100 (XBOX) 82/100 (GC) 83/100 (PC) 80/100

Review scores
Publication	Score
Eurogamer	7/10
GameSpot	9.3/10
GameSpy	3/5
IGN	(PS2) 8.4/10 (XBOX) 8.4/10 (GC) 8.4/10 (PC) 8.4/10

Freedom Fighters received "generally positive" reviews, according to review aggregator outlets Metacritic and GameRankings. It was praised for having an excellent AI for squad tactics, which served to enhance the sense of immersion in the "extremely detailed" environments and maintain the illusion of working with a team. The game's sound quality was also of note, both for the realistic combat noises and the game's Russian-influenced music, which "adds a perfect level of drama to the proceedings." GameSpot named it the best GameCube game of September 2003.

Critics noted that while the game "does a marvelous job" of creating a realistic environment, the story was lacking in substance and fairly predictable, and while the squad AI is good, the enemy AI was lacking. Another source of criticism was the game's length. The game can be cleared relatively quickly, but offers little replay value. According to Jeff Gerstmann of GameSpot, "The only real problem with Freedom Fighters is that there simply isn't enough of it."

== Sequel ==
On April 6, 2004, Eidos Interactive revealed plans for the sequel. Eidos announced it would distribute the sequel in the latter part of 2005. However, IO Interactive announced development of a new game, Kane & Lynch: Dead Men, casting the future of a Freedom Fighters sequel in doubt.

In 2010, when asked about a potential sequel, Kane & Lynch 2: Dog Days director Karsten Lund refused to comment. In 2011, IO Interactive's official Twitter account tweeted that Freedom Fighters 2 is "definitely something a lot of us are interested in doing". In 2017, IO Interactive split from Square Enix and took with them the rights to Freedom Fighters since it was published before the Eidos buyout.
