= Hitman: Absolution =

2012 video game

- Developer: IO Interactive (Note: Ported to Windows by Nixxes Software and ported to macOS, iOS, Android, Nintendo Switch, and Nintendo Switch 2 by Feral Interactive)
- Publisher: Square Enix Europe (Note: Feral Interactive published the macOS, iOS, Android, Nintendo Switch and Nintendo Switch 2 versions, while Warner Bros. Interactive Entertainment published the Xbox One and PlayStation 4 versions.)
- Directors: Tore Blystad; Peter Fleckenstein
- Producer: Hakan B. Abrak
- Designer: Lee Varley
- Artist: Martin Vestergaard Madsen
- Writers: Greg Nagan; Tore Blystad; Michael Vogt
- Composers: Peter Peter; Peter Kyed; Thomas Bartschi (Note: Additional music composed by Dynamedion)
- Series: Hitman
- Engine: Glacier 2
- Platforms: PlayStation 3; Windows; Xbox 360; macOS; PlayStation 4; Xbox One; iOS; Android; Nintendo Switch; Nintendo Switch 2
- Release: PlayStation 3, Windows, Xbox 360; 20 November 2012; macOS; 15 May 2014; PlayStation 4, Xbox One; 11 January 2019; iOS, Android; 16 October 2025; Nintendo Switch; 13 November 2025; Nintendo Switch 2; 22 October 2026
- Genre: Stealth
- Mode: Single-player

Hitman: Absolution is a 2012 action stealth game developed by IO Interactive and published by Square Enix Europe. It is the fifth installment in the Hitman series and the sequel to 2006's Hitman: Blood Money. Before release, the developers stated that Absolution would be easier to play and more accessible, while still retaining hardcore aspects of the franchise. The game was released on 20 November 2012 for PlayStation 3, Windows, and Xbox 360. On 15 May 2014, Hitman: Absolution – Elite Edition was released for macOS by Feral Interactive; it contains all previously released downloadable content, including Hitman: Sniper Challenge, a "making of" documentary, and a 72-page artbook. On 11 January 2019, Warner Bros. Interactive Entertainment released enhanced versions of Absolution and Blood Money for the PlayStation 4 and Xbox One as part of the Hitman HD Enhanced Collection. Feral Interactive later released ports of the game for iOS and Android on 16 October 2025, for Nintendo Switch on 13 November 2025, and for Nintendo Switch 2 on 2 October 2026 as the Nintendo Switch 2 Edition.

Absolution's single-player campaign follows genetically engineered contract killer Agent 47 and his efforts to protect a similarly genetically enhanced teenage girl from various parties who wish to use her potential as an assassin for their own ends, including a private military company, several criminal syndicates, and 47's former employers, the International Contract Agency (ICA). The game features an online component called "Contracts", which allows the player to create their own custom objectives for any of the missions in the base game and share them with others.

The game was met with a polarized reception upon release, with most of the praise focusing on its graphics, environments and locations, as well as varied gameplay options. However, many critics and players disliked the game for its narrative, issues with the disguise system, and the game's linear structure as opposed to the open ended nature of previous installments. As of March 2013, the game had sold over 3.6 million copies. Following Absolution's reception, the series returned to a more open-ended style of gameplay in 2016's Hitman.

== Gameplay ==
In this gameplay screenshot, Agent 47 is disguised as a policeman. Disguises allow players to gain access to previously restricted areas.

Hitman: Absolution is a stealth game in which the player assumes the role of Agent 47, an assassin for hire. Presented from a third-person perspective, the gameplay centers around completing a number of objectives within a series of levels. Objectives range from reaching the end of a level to eliminating specific individuals. The player chooses how to complete each mission and is able to take multiple paths to reach targets and locations. Players may use pistols, bottles or bricks, assault or sniper rifles, shotguns, fiber-wire, or steel pipes against enemies if opting for action-oriented approaches, or avoid adversaries altogether by using disguises, blending into the environment, and only attacking specific targets using a stealth-oriented approach. Agent 47 has an 'Instinct' ability that lets the player monitor enemies more easily. There are environmental ways to kill or distract individuals; poison can be used to spike coffee, a switch to make a disco ball fall and break, a massive explosion at a gas station, levers to make scaffolding to fall down, small or large fires, and fireworks can be set off. The player must complete a number of chapters in order to progress through the story. The game features a variety of locations, including a mansion, library, strip club, gun store, wrestling arena, courthouse, and hotel.

Absolution introduces an online option to the Hitman series, 'Contracts', where the player can create their own missions for others to participate in. The player chooses one of the areas from the game's story missions and decide which non-player characters (NPCs) are required to be eliminated, what weapon must be used to eliminate each target, what disguise is required, whether the body must be hidden or not and if the player is allowed to be spotted by the AI. The online servers for "Contracts" were shut down in May 2018 due to IO Interactive encountering difficulties in complying with GDPR legislation.

== Plot ==
Genetically engineered assassin Agent 47 (David Bateson) is ordered by the International Contract Agency (ICA), to kill his former handler Diana Burnwood (Marsha Thomason), who, for unknown reasons, has betrayed the organisation: Diana had sabotaged funding streams and publicized their database, bringing undesired attention to the Agency. 47 infiltrates Diana's Chicago estate and reluctantly shoots her in the bathroom. Whilst bleeding out, Diana reveals she betrayed the Agency to prevent a genetically engineered teenage girl named Victoria (Isabelle Fuhrman) from becoming an assassin like 47. She asks 47 to protect Victoria, leading 47's new handler, Benjamin Travis (Powers Boothe), to brand him a traitor.

As the Agency knows all of 47's safe houses, 47 hides Victoria at the Rosewood Orphanage before meeting a disgraced ICA informant known as 'Birdie' (Steven Bauer). 47 and Birdie broker a deal in which 47 agrees to kill a local crime lord called the 'King of Chinatown' and trade his Silverballer pistols for information. After 47 meets his end of the deal, Birdie tells 47 about Blake Dexter (Keith Carradine), an international arms dealer. 47 sneaks into the air ducts adjacent to Dexter's room in the Terminus Hotel and learns that Dexter and his secretary/mistress Layla Stockton (Traci Lords) intend to kidnap Victoria and sell her to the highest bidder. Before he can confront the pair, 47 is knocked out by Dexter's genetically engineered bodyguard, Sanchez (Isaac C. Singleton Jr.), who resists 47's piano wire.

Dexter frames 47 for the murder of a hotel maid before setting the hotel suite alight, from which 47 narrowly escapes. Pursued by police, 47 evades an extensive police presence by escaping through an abandoned library into a hippie commune and then out through the Chicago subway network. 47 then kills one of Dexter's informants, mobster Dom Osmond (Jon Curry), at his strip club. 47 discovers that Dexter has hired a group of mercenaries led by Edward Wade (Larry Cedar) to ensure the capture of Victoria. Wade subsequently dispatches Bill Dole (Nicolas Roye), Larry Clay (James Sie), and Frank Owens (Jeffrey Johnson) to capture Birdie and find Victoria. Though 47 successfully kills Dole, Clay and Owens during a Chinese New Year celebration, Birdie is caught by Sanchez and trades Victoria's location for his life. 47 rushes back to the Orphanage and eliminates Wade and his assault team. However, Dexter's son Lenny (Shane Stevens), managing to be in the right place at the right time, grabs Victoria and escapes.

After obtaining Lenny's location from a bartender during a bar fight, Birdie provides 47 with the address of a gun store holding his 'Silverballer' pistols. From there, 47 moves onto the town of Hope, South Dakota, unaware that Birdie has also contacted the ICA and Detective Cosmo Faulkner (Jonathan Adams) of the Chicago Police Department, culminating in several attempts to kill 47 by the Agency. Despite the town being firmly under Dexter Industries' control, 47 is able to covertly kill the entirety of Lenny's gang, the Hope Cougars. In doing so, 47 disrupts the gang's plan to sell Victoria to a rival weapons corporation for a significant payout. 47 kidnaps Lenny and interrogates him in the desert, before either killing or abandoning him. 47 continues on to a Dexter Industries' facility, infiltrating its laboratory and eliminating key leadership within the science division tasked with examining Victoria, and destroys their research. 47 also discovers an fighting match taking place on site at which he is able to kill Sanchez.

47 recuperates at a motel, but is attacked by an Agency division led by "The Saints", Travis' all-female personal hit squad. 47 moves through the motel, eliminating the majority of the Saints before escaping out of the grounds and into the neighboring farm land. There, he identifies a mobile command post and finishes off the remaining Saints before tracking Victoria to Hope Courthouse jail, run by corrupt sheriff and Dexter ally Clive Skurky (Jon Gries). 47 is captured and tortured instead.

As 47 escapes from the jail, Travis summons Dexter to a meeting in which he seeks to buy Victoria back for $10 million. The ICA launches a full scale assault on the town. 47 evades the Agency and eventually corners Skurky in a church, who reveals that Dexter and Travis will be meeting to sell Victoria at Blackwater Park, Chicago. 47 kills Skurky, infiltrates Blackwater, makes his way into Dexter's residence, and kills Layla before finally hunting Dexter himself to the top of the park. As Dexter's men rig the building to explode, 47 successfully prevents Dexter's escape via helicopter, mortally wounding him. After lamenting the loss of his son and money, Dexter is left to die alone.

Several months later, Travis and the ICA exhume Diana's grave at the Burnwood crypt in Cornwall, suspecting she has faked her death. Working with Diana, 47 kills Travis' assistant Jade Nguyen (Shannyn Sossamon) and his elite bodyguards before mortally wounding Travis. Travis rants at him for wasting Victoria's potential for the ICA, and asks whether Diana is really dead, to which 47 responds "You will never know" before finishing him off. Sometime later, 47 observes Diana and Victoria from a rooftop across Lake Michigan via sniper rifle, confirming that Diana did fake her death with 47's help and is now looking after Victoria. The game ends with a message from Diana to Agent 47 welcoming him back to the ICA and thanking him, as his actions have helped purge the ICA of internal corruption. In the final scene, Detective Cosmo Faulkner, who has been tracking 47 since the Terminus Hotel fire, is having trouble discovering 47's identity until Birdie appears and offers to help him for a price as the door slowly closes.

== Development ==
Though plans to continue the Hitman franchise were announced in 2007, it was not until May 2009 that Eidos confirmed the game was in development. Certain plot details for the game were rumored in 2009, stating that the game's story would lead Agent 47 to a low point from which he would have to rebuild himself. On 20 April 2011, Square Enix filed the trademark for the name Hitman: Absolution in Europe, leading sites to speculate that it would be the name of the fifth Hitman game. On 6 May 2011, a teaser trailer was released, confirming the title Hitman: Absolution. The trailer briefly showed Agent 47 attaching a suppressor and a rattlesnake coiled around his signature Silverballer pistol. It has been reported the game will be a "familiar and yet significantly different experience from other Hitman games." On 9 October 2011, a full gameplay trailer entitled "Run for Your Life" was released.

Originally William Mapother had been cast as Agent 47, replacing original voice actor David Bateson. Bateson had not been notified of his replacement and only found out when the first trailer was released. However, following fan backlash, Bateson was rehired just six months before the game's release. Mapother's motion capture performance for Agent 47 is still included in the game.

In 2023, chief creative officer of IO, Christian Elverdam, said that Absolution "is fundamentally a really good stealth-action game" and that many of the lessons learned in creating it can be seen in the World of Assassination trilogy.

== Marketing ==
The Professional Edition of Hitman: Absolution features Professional Clamshell packaging for the game, a Hitman art book, making of DVD "Burning Hope" and the "Agency Gun Pack" DLC.

=== Hitman: Sniper Challenge ===
Hitman: Sniper Challenge, a single sniping mission, was developed by IO Interactive, originally as a pre-order bonus, available to people who pre-order the game. The code would be supplied by retailers upon pre-order of the game, and could be collected from retailers before release as a download code before the game's release. At the time of pre-order, Sniper Challenge was redeemable via the PSN Store, Xbox Live Marketplace and PC. While the console version launched worldwide on 15 May 2012, the PC version wasn't released until 1 August 2012.

=== Pre-order bonuses ===
Square Enix announced special Hitman: Absolution pre-order bonuses for selected retailers. For Steam purchased games, these downloadable content are available as well. These items only work for Contract mode and not the single-player story mode.

- High Tech Suit and Bartoli Custom Pistol – The advanced High Tech suit provides Agent 47 with 50% increased armor paired with the Bartoli Custom, an engineered precision weapon, complete with sight and silencer.
- Public Enemy Suit and the Bronson M1928 submachine gun – The Original Assassin can dress in a stylish Public Enemy gangster suit armed with the Bronson M1928, an imaginary submachine gun with high fire rate and deadly stopping power.
- Agency Kazo TRG sniper rifle – This weapon is fully upgradeable with both scope and silencer.
- High Roller Suit and the Krugermeier 2-2 Pistol – The High Roller suit dresses Agent 47 in a fancy tuxedo discreetly outfitted with the Krugermeier, an accurate, reliable stealth weapon with a built-in silencer.
- Hitman: Absolution: Public Enemy Disguise – This disguise gives Agent 47 a 1930s gangster look.
- Hitman: Absolution: Deus Ex (Adam Jensen) Disguise – This "suit" makes Agent 47 look like Adam Jensen from Deus Ex: Human Revolution, complete with built-in sunglasses. This DLC also unlocks the Steiner-Bisley Zenith pistol from the same game.

== Reception ==
=== Critical response ===
Reception

Aggregate score
Aggregator	Score
Metacritic	(PC) 79/100 (PS3) 83/100 (X360) 79/100

Review scores
Publication	Score
1Up.com	A−
Destructoid	8.5/10
Edge	7/10
Eurogamer	7/10
Game Informer	8.75/10
GameSpot	7.5/10
GamesRadar+	4.5/5
GameTrailers	6.9/10
Giant Bomb	4/5
IGN	9/10
Joystiq	4/5
PC Gamer (US)	66/100
VideoGamer.com	5/10
International Business Times	5/10
The Daily Telegraph	2/5
VentureBeat	7.5/10

Hitman: Absolution received "generally favorable" reviews, according to review aggregator website Metacritic. Positive reviews came from GamesRadar+, calling it "one of the strongest entries in the series to date", and Game Informer, who wrote that "devising a strategy, using the environment and disguises to your advantage, and leaving before anyone knows you're there are the hallmarks of a perfect hit, and Absolution proves Agent 47 is still gaming's premier hitman."

Edge gave it 7/10, saying "the game has taken a unique formula and diluted it". VentureBeat gave it 7.5/10 saying "Absolution aims high but misses the mark." Eurogamer gave it 7/10 saying "Agent 47 doesn't begin Hitman: Absolution with amnesia, but the six years that have passed since we last took control of him in Blood Money do seem to have dulled his creators' recollections of what made him so popular in the first place." GameSpot gave it 7.5/10 saying "Hitman: Absolution's vivid world and enjoyable stealth-action gameplay overshadow its few notable inconsistencies." IGN gave it 9/10 saying "It's nice to have a game that doesn't just encourage improvisation; it requires it." Kotaku gave Absolution a positive review. Giant Bomb gave it 4/5, as did Joystiq. Destructoid gave it 8.5/10. 1Up.com gave the game an A− saying "Hitman Absolution didn't win me over with its story, but its gameplay maintains a standard of excellence and introduces a level of choice that deserves your attention."

The Daily Telegraph gave the game a 2/5 saying "Despite the fact that Absolution is a hugely disappointing entry into the canon, Hitman is still a fabulous series." International Business Times gave the game a 5/10 saying "An unremarkable, derivative clone of a game that's barely a shadow of what Hitman used to be." VideoGamer.com gave it 5/10 saying "The problem with Absolution is that its new custodians from the Kane and Lynch team seem to have fundamentally misunderstood what made Hitman great." PC Gamer gave it 66% saying "A passable stealth game, but one that betrays almost everything that, until now, has made Hitman great." GameTrailers gave it 6.9/10 saying "It's clear that a good deal of effort was put into crafting Hitman: Absolution's world. This makes its flaws all the more unfortunate." The New Statesman gave no rating but said "If developers want to win back fans when they revisit established franchises maybe they should look to what made those games popular in the first place and by doing so maybe they'd avoid stepping on a rake or two." The Irish Times gave no score but said "The move away from the completely open world may leave some hardcore fans of Hitman disappointed." The Daily Record gave the game 3/5 saying "While it's more accessible than previous Hitman games, Absolution loses a lot of the freedom that fans of the franchise love, and perhaps doesn't necessarily fit the Hitman name any longer." The Escapist gave no score but said "Hitman: Absolution is not the best nor the worst Hitman". The Guardian gave it 3/5 saying "The game may look better and play better than any Hitman game before it, but one can only marvel at how IO managed to lose sight of their IP's most appealing aspects so often."

In June 2025, David Bateson said that Absolution is his favorite game in the Hitman series.

=== Sales ===
On 26 March 2013, Square Enix announced that the game had sold about 3.6 million copies at retail, but has failed to reach predicted sales targets.

=== Technical issues ===
Shortly after launch, scores of complaints came in about the game crashing, freezing and corrupting file saves on the PlayStation 3 and the Xbox 360, rendering many of the games unplayable. On 26 November 2012, IO Interactive stated that they were working around the clock to try and fix these technical errors, but also stated that they did not know what exactly was causing the errors, so a patch may take some time.

The patch for the PS3 version was released on 11 December 2012, while the Xbox 360 patch was released on 20 December 2012.

=== Controversies ===
On 29 May 2012, a cinematic teaser trailer, produced by Square Enix's CGI studio Visual Works, titled "Attack of the Saints", was released. The trailer's depiction of "gun-toting, PVC and latex-clad nuns being killed in a hail of bullets" sparked controversy over the allegedly sexist portrayal of women. IO Interactive's Tore Blystad, the game's director, later apologized, stating they're "sorry that we offended people" and that it "was truly not the intention of the trailer."

On 4 December 2012, IO Interactive faced heavy criticism for releasing a Hitman: Absolution Facebook app that allowed users to identify and threaten Facebook friends for assassination. Methods of identifying female friends included "her hairy legs", "her muffin top" and "her small tits". Methods of identifying male friends included "his ginger hair", "his shit hair" and "his tiny penis". Users could choose a reason to kill their friend, such as the fact that they "smell bad" or were cheating on their partner. Friends received a personalised video on their Facebook wall identifying them as a target. Signing up to watch the video presented recipients with a mixture of their own photos and Facebook details merged into a video of Hitman character Agent 47 shooting them. IO Interactive admitted the promotional app was in bad taste and removed it the same day.

=== Accolades ===
Hitman: Absolution was nominated for "Best Action Game" at the 9th British Academy Games Awards. The Academy of Interactive Arts & Sciences nominated Hitman: Absolution for "Action Game of the Year", "Outstanding Achievement in Animation", and "Outstanding Achievement in Visual Engineering" during the 16th Annual D.I.C.E. Awards.
