= Jonas Eneroth =

Swedish video game producer and designer

- Born: Gothenburg, Sweden
- Education: Georgetown University
- Occupation: Executive Producer
- Known for: video game development

Jonas Eneroth (born in Gothenburg, Sweden) is a video game producer, game designer and entrepreneur.

His work spans several top 100 video games, critically acclaimed titles such as Marathon Trilogy, Hitman, Deus Ex, Thief, Project IGI and TimeSplitters.

== Early life ==
Eneroth graduated Georgetown University with degrees in Finance and Computer Science. Although starting out in investment banking, his long term hobby as a games programmer kept Jonas active in both the growing Mod (computer gaming) community and early on-line game development. While at university he created a number of game modifications and level packs that would later bring him to the attention of Bungie and a start as a game designer.

== Video games ==
Eneroth's earliest commercial work in the video game industry began in Chicago. Initially working on Marathon Trilogy in 1995 at Halo creator Bungie. He worked initially as a level designer but focused increasingly on more production and commercial aspects of game development. He would provide community and tools support for the growing map making community around Bungie's games, being "Bungie's very own flameproof guy-on-the-front-line."

Prior to Bungie's acquisition by Microsoft, Eneroth moved to London, England to work with Tomb Raider publisher Eidos Interactive as their first Executive Producer. At Eidos he would oversee production of critically acclaimed titles such as Hitman, Deus Ex, Legacy of Kain, Thief, Project IGI, TimeSplitters and Fear Effect. Most notably, he helped originate the first Hitman project which in turn helped IO Interactive, then Reto-Moto, establish themselves as a studio. IO Interactive would later be acquired by Eidos.

Eneroth co-founded Wired Realms, a multiplayer and Massively Multiplayer Online focused production company for mobile and console gaming. While serving as Creative Director he also took on management of the company's studio locations in London and San Francisco. After the sale of the studio he took on the role of President of the mobile and handheld studio within the Climax Studios group. The studio worked extensively with ATI and Qualcomm on 3D applications for the then new generation of accelerated mobile devices.

In 2007, he re-joined Eidos Interactive at its IO Interactive studio in Denmark as development director to oversee and restructure production of Hitman: Absolution during Eidos' transition and sale to Square Enix. After the acquisition, he left the studio to return to the growing social, mobile and Facebook games space.

== Industry ==
Former President, London chapter of the IGDA.

Contributor to "Game Design: Theory and Practice" (ISBN 978-1556229121) a book on game design by Richard Rouse III, published by Wordware Publishing in 2002/2005.

Speaker and advisory board at X-Summit 2011, Ontario, Canada.

Board member, Pixel Pandemic and Executive Producer, Zombie Pandemic.

Managing director and board member of ProCloud Media Invest AB, Malmö, Sweden

Nordic Games

== See also ==
- Eidos Interactive
- Square Enix Europe
- 1994 in video gaming
- Zombie Apocalypse
- List of multiplayer browser games
- List of free massively multiplayer online games
