= IO Interactive =

Danish video game company

IO Interactive A/S
- Formerly: IO Interactive ApS (1998–2000)
- Type: Private
- Industry: Video games
- Founded: 16 September 1998; 28 years ago
- Founders: Jesper Vorsholt Jørgensen; Rasmus Guldberg-Kjær; Martin Munk Pollas; Karsten Lemann Hvidberg; Jacob Andersen; Janos Flösser; David Guldbrandsen
- Headquarters: Copenhagen, Denmark
- Key people: Hakan B. Abrak (CEO)
- Products: Hitman series; Kane & Lynch series; Freedom Fighters; Mini Ninjas; 007 First Light
- Revenue: 281.5 million kr. (40.8 million USD) (2023)
- Operating income: 47.1 million kr. (6.8 million USD) (2023)
- Net income: 55.6 million kr. (8.1 million USD) (2023)
- Total assets: 1.097 billion kr. (159.1 million USD) (2023)
- Total equity: 913.9 million kr. (132.5 million USD) (2023)
- Number of employees: >500 (2025)
- Parent: Square Enix Europe (2004–2017)
- Divisions: IOI Partners
- Subsidiaries: IOI Barcelona; IOI Brighton; IOI Malmö
- Website: ioi.dk

IO Interactive A/S (IOI) is a Danish video game developer and publisher based in Copenhagen, best known for creating and developing the Hitman and Kane and Lynch franchises. IO Interactive's most recent game is 007 First Light, released in 2026.

The company was founded in September 1998 as a joint venture between the seven-man development team of Reto-Moto and film studio Nordisk Film. IO Interactive was acquired by publisher Eidos Interactive for £23 million in March 2004, which saw itself acquired by Square Enix and renamed as Square Enix Europe in 2009. In May 2017, Square Enix ceased funding for IO Interactive and started seeking a buyer for the studio. IO Interactive performed a management buyout in June 2017, becoming independent and regaining the rights to its Hitman and Freedom Fighters franchises. IO Interactive employs over 500 people as of June 2025 and operates three subsidiary studios: IOI Malmö in Malmö, Sweden; IOI Barcelona in Barcelona, Spain, and IOI Brighton in Brighton, England.

== History ==
=== Background and foundation (1997–1998) ===
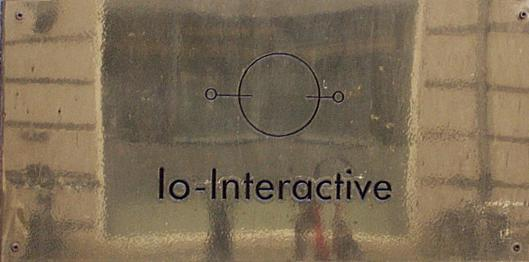
Sign outside IO Interactive's former location at Farvergade 2, Copenhagen

In 1997, Reto-Moto was founded as a video game developer in Copenhagen. Before the studio finished any games, it struck a partnership with Danish film studio Nordisk Film in 1998 that would lead to the creation of a developer jointly owned by the two companies. The resulting company, IO Interactive, was established on 16 September 1998, with Reto-Moto's seven employees—Jesper Vorsholt Jørgensen, Rasmus Guldberg-Kjær, Martin Munk Pollas, Karsten Lemann Hvidberg, Jacob Andersen, Janos Flösser, and David Guldbrandsen—serving as the founders and initial staff of IO Interactive. Nordisk Film held 50% in the venture, as did the seven founders combined. By March 2004, Nordisk Film owned 40.3% in IO Interactive.

=== Hitman: Codename 47 (1998–2000) ===
Early on, IO Interactive conceptualised a fantasy massively multiplayer online game (MMO) entitled Rex Dominus, however, Nordisk Film staff asked the development team to cease production on Rex Dominus and "test [themselves]" by developing a "simple shooter" instead. As such, the team opted for a run-and-gun action game, as it took less time to develop compared to an MMO, drawing inspiration from John Woo films, such as Hard Boiled and The Killer. They turned to develop for personal computers (PCs), because they were unable to acquire development kits for consoles, and had also found interest in the steady increase of PCs' 3D graphics capabilities.

A part of the development on the game, which would later become Hitman: Codename 47, was the creation of the Glacier, the studio's proprietary game engine that fit their needs; co-founder Andersen stated: "Since killing was the main theme of the game, we wanted to do something special. [...] Standard 'death animations' just looked too static so some of the coders tried to see if they could use real-time inverse kinematics for the falling bodies. The first versions ran terribly slowly until one of the programmers figured out a way to fake the whole calculation." This led to the first use of advanced ragdoll physics in a video game. This physics system caught the eyes of British publisher Eidos Interactive, and especially staff member Jonas Eneroth, who thought that the system could greatly benefit Codename 47's gameplay. Following six months of negotiations, a publishing deal was signed between IO Interactive and Eidos Interactive. Eneroth became executive producer on the project.

As executive producer, Eneroth encouraged the development team to stray away from the run-and-gun gameplay, and instead focus on a "methodical experience", including dragging dead bodies around the scene to create tension. He had previously worked on Deus Ex and Thief: The Dark Project, which had heavily exposed him to the stealth game mechanics he wished to see in Codename 47. The game was released on 19 November 2000, with reception mixed due to the difficulty of the game.

=== Further ventures (2000–2004) ===
In October 2001, Eidos Interactive announced Hitman 2: Silent Assassin, a sequel to Codename 47. Following a slight delay in March 2002, it was released in October 2002, this time for Microsoft Windows, as well as PlayStation 2 and Xbox. To more easily overcome the challenge of bringing the game to consoles, IO Interactive grew "considerably" in headcount. The game was received well by critics; according to Greg Kasavin in his review for GameSpot, "Hitman 2 fixes virtually all of the problems of its predecessor". The success of Silent Assassin came as a surprise to the team, and was swiftly followed up with by porting the game to GameCube the following year.

In 2003, IO Interactive decided to open a Hungarian offshoot, named IO Interactive Hungary. To properly establish the studio, 50 Hungarian staff were hired and brought to the company's Copenhagen headquarters for a six-month training programme. However, after the training had been finished, IO Interactive realised that there were 50 people with talent but no leadership that could guide them when in Hungary. Instead of fulfilling the Hungarian subsidiary, IO Interactive opted to offer all 50 people jobs at their headquarters, to which most of them agreed. In October that year, Electronic Arts released Freedom Fighters, an IO Interactive-developed third-person shooter which was previously announced as Freedom: The Battle for Liberty Island in May 2002. Although a sequel to Freedom Fighters has been anticipated, IO Interactive has been unable to comment on whether such a game was in development.

=== Acquisition by Eidos Interactive, further Hitman releases (2004–2006) ===
On 3 March 2004, Eidos Interactive announced that it was acquiring IO Interactive for £23 million in cash and stock, plus another £5 million linked to the studio's performance in the following four years. The deal closed on 31 March that year. At the time, IO Interactive was Europe's 10th largest video game developer, with 140 staff members employed at their offices. The sale was primarily negotiated by founding member Flösser.

The first game to release under Eidos Interactive's management was Hitman: Contracts, the third game in the Hitman franchise, which was announced and released in April that year. The game was developed in about nine months, from concept stage to console submission, but was under the influence of "crunch time" throughout the entire development. Contracts received positive reception. The next game, Hitman: Blood Money, was announced shortly afterwards, in November 2004. Released in May 2006, the game was praised by critics and has been referred to in multiple retrospectives as the best game in the Hitman series.

=== Other games (2006–2010) ===
IO Interactive announced its next game, Kane & Lynch: Dead Men, in August 2006. Unlike its Hitman games, Kane & Lynch: Dead Men played as a linear, cooperative gameplay-focused third-person shooter, as opposed to Hitman's sandbox solo stealth gameplay. Released in November 2007, the game gained mixed reviews, wherein some reviewers felt like the game had a disconnect with modern gameplay styles. On 11 April 2008, four of IO Interactive's co-founders, Vorsholt Jørgensen, Pollas, Andersen and Guldbrandsen, announced that they had, together with former Eidos Interactive executive producer Neil Donnell, reformed Reto-Moto as an active developer. Guldbrandsen and Donnell became chief technology officer and chief executive officer, respectively. Six further IO Interactive employees followed to Reto-Moto in December that year. Co-founder and at the time managing director Flösser left the company in April 2008, and was succeeded by Niels Jørgensen, who had joined the company in 2002.

In January 2009, Eidos Interactive announced IO Interactive-developed Mini Ninjas, a family-friendly game, as opposed to all of the studio's previous titles. Jørgensen explained that, using Mini Ninjas, the studio wanted to reach a broader demographic in the gaming market. Shortly after the announcement of Mini Ninjas, in April 2009, Eidos Interactive was acquired by Japanese video game conglomerate Square Enix for £84.3 million. Eidos Interactive was reorganised over the course of 2009 and became known as Square Enix Europe in November that year. Square Enix Europe continued to oversee its previously owned development studios, including IO Interactive. Speaking for IO Interactive, Karsten Lund stated that the studio experienced "no loss of freedom" following the buyout.

A sequel to Kane & Lynch: Dead Men, titled Kane & Lynch 2: Dog Days, was announced in November 2009, and released in August 2010. Critics found that most elements in the game had deliberately been made "ugly" to better fit into the well-told story of the game. In a November 2009 interview with gaming website Gamasutra, Jørgensen revealed that, due to the high costs associated with living in Scandinavia, much of the company's graphic department had been outsourced to Shanghai. The Chinese office had been set up by two Danish representatives from IO Interactive, with one Dane permanently residing in Shanghai to look over the outsourcing progress. In March 2010, 35 of previously 200 employees were let go from the company. A further 30 people were laid off in November that year, supposedly due to the cancellation of a project that was in development for Microsoft.

=== Return to Hitman (2011–2016) ===
In May 2011, IO Interactive and Square Enix announced that they would be returning to the Hitman franchise through a new entry, Hitman: Absolution. A spin-off demo, Hitman: Sniper Challenge, was released in May 2012. Absolution was released in November that year, and, like Blood Money, saw highly positive reception from critics. However, many fans of the series, including the developers at IO Interactive, felt like Absolution was leaning too far into the mainstream, as a result of which it was losing its core player base. In February 2012, Square Enix opened a new Copenhagen office under the IO Interactive name. The following March, this new office was announced to be Hapti.co, a subsidiary developing the Core Online cloud gaming service. Hapti.co was sold to Wargaming Mobile, the mobile games division of publisher Wargaming, in September 2017, and was renamed as Wargaming Copenhagen.

In June 2013, 70 staff members, half of IO Interactive's workforce at the time, were made redundant due to "internal adjustments to face the challenges of today's market". Square Enix announced that, from that point on, IO Interactive would exclusively focus on the development of new entries in the Hitman franchise. At the same time, Hannes Seifert, who for the past three years had held the position of production director at IO Interactive, took over the company's management as studio head. At a June 2015 press conference, Sony announced that a new game in the Hitman series, simply titled Hitman, had been slated for a December 2015 release. The game was shortly delayed to March 2016, and later announced to be released in an episodic model. As such, starting in March 2016, the first season for the game was released through six episodes, the last of which was released in October 2016. Around the same time, Ryan Barnard, previously director of the game The Division, left Massive Entertainment to join IO Interactive. At the time, IO Interactive had 170 employees, and was the largest video game developer in Denmark.

=== Management buyout, further Hitman games, 007 and Project Fantasy (2017–present) ===
Seifert announced in February 2017 that he had left IO Interactive to return to his home country of Austria to pursue an unannounced project. Hakan B. Abrak, also formerly production director for the studio, took over his duties, becoming chief executive officer.

In May 2017, Square Enix announced that it had withdrawn funding from IO Interactive and would begin negotiating with potential investors that would want to purchase the studio. Several jobs were cut at IO Interactive shortly following that announcement. On 16 June 2017, IO Interactive announced that it had performed a management buyout, as a result of which it became independent. Square Enix retained a minor financial stake in IO Interactive. The buyout also included the intellectual property (IP) for Hitman and Freedom Fighters, but lacked that of Kane & Lynch and Mini Ninjas. Yosuke Matsuda, president and chief executive officer of Square Enix at the time, stated that the company's decision to divest itself of IO Interactive, alongside Hitman, was made because it felt like the series needed to go on, but would be in better hands with another partner or with IO Interactive itself. IO Interactive's associate director, Eskil Mohl, said that, when Square Enix decided to withdraw from the studio, it was already working on Hitman 2, and the job cuts were a necessary step to make sure that the studio would remain viable without Square Enix's backing; Mohl felt that this helped harden the studio to make Hitman 2 a stronger game.

IO Interactive confirmed shortly after the split that all profits from 2016's Hitman would from that point go directly to the studio. In August that year, the studio confirmed that another Hitman game was in development. In April 2018, IO Interactive partnered with Warner Bros. Interactive Entertainment (WBIE) to distribute a Definitive Edition of 2016's Hitman, which was released in the following month. In June 2018, IO Interactive announced Hitman 2. Unlike 2016's Hitman, Hitman 2 does not feature an episodic release format. Published by WBIE, Hitman 2 was released in November that year. On 16 January 2019, IO Interactive opened a subsidiary studio, IOI Malmö, in Malmö, Sweden. IO Interactive continued its partnership with WBIE and, by October 2019, had turned it into a multi-IP deal.

In June 2020, IO Interactive announced Hitman 3, the conclusion to its World of Assassination trilogy, which was released on 20 January 2021 for Windows computers and current and next-gen consoles, with IO publishing the game themselves.

In November 2020, the company announced Project 007, an original James Bond video game, working closely with licensors MGM and Eon Productions. IO studio director Hakan Abrak said it had spent about two years in preparing a pitch to the Bond license holders, knowing that the current rights holders, Barbara Broccoli and Michael G. Wilson were dissatisfied with the amount of violence in past Bond video games. IO's Bond will be a wholly original character and not use any of the film actors' likenesses, and Abrak anticipates that this game would be the start of a trilogy of Bond games. Abrak expected that the game would require it to double its current staff of 200 employees to 400 by the time the first Bond game is released. The game was officially unveiled as 007 First Light in June 2025.

IOI Barcelona, based in Barcelona, Spain, was announced in April 2021. The studio is to assist IOI on its active projects, including further Hitman entries and 007 First Light.

In February 2023, IO Interactive announced Project Fantasy, this new IP is set to be an online fantasy RPG, a departure from IO's Hitman games.

IO Interactive announced in March 2023 that they would be establishing a new office in Turkey called IOI Istanbul. The company also announced that another studio would open in Brighton, England in July of that year. IOI Brighton would help support the development of IO's 007 First Light, Project Fantasy and Hitman.

In June 2026, IO Interactive announced that it would be laying off staff after Microsoft and Xbox withdrew their publishing and funding support from Project Fantasy's development. While IO Interactive indicated that they would continue to work on Project Fantasy despite the setback, the loss of funding resulted in the closure of IOI Istanbul.

==== Expansion into third party publishing ====
In 2024, IO Interactive established IOI Partners, a publishing label. The first project to be announced was MindsEye, from Leslie Benzies's Build A Rocket Boy. IOI was responsible for the game's marketing and distribution and MindsEye serves as a demonstration of the Everywhere platform. Hakan Abrak, CEO of IO Interactive, mentioned that the game was well along in its development.

MindsEye was released in June 2025 to an overwhelmingly negative reception. In March 2026, IOI Partners ended its relationship with Build a Rocket Boy, handing the publishing for MindsEye back to the developer and cancelling a planned crossover with Hitman.

== Games developed ==
Year	Title	Platform(s)	Publisher(s)
2000	Hitman: Codename 47	Windows	Eidos Interactive
2002	Hitman 2: Silent Assassin	GameCube, PlayStation 2, Windows, Xbox	Eidos Interactive
2003	Freedom Fighters	GameCube, PlayStation 2, Windows, Xbox	Electronic Arts
2004	Hitman: Contracts	PlayStation 2, Windows, Xbox	Eidos Interactive
2006	Hitman: Blood Money	Android, iOS, Nintendo Switch, PlayStation 2, Windows, Xbox, Xbox 360	Eidos Interactive, Feral Interactive
2007	Kane & Lynch: Dead Men	Microsoft Windows, PlayStation 3, Xbox 360	Eidos Interactive
2009	Mini Ninjas	macOS, Nintendo DS, PlayStation 3, Wii, Windows, Xbox 360	Eidos Interactive, Feral Interactive
2010	Kane & Lynch 2: Dog Days	PlayStation 3, Windows, Xbox 360	Square Enix
2012	Hitman: Absolution	macOS, PlayStation 3, Windows, Xbox 360	Square Enix, Feral Interactive
2016	Hitman	Linux, macOS, PlayStation 4, Stadia, Windows, Xbox One	Square Enix, Feral Interactive
2018	Hitman 2	PlayStation 4, Stadia, Windows, Xbox One	Warner Bros. Interactive Entertainment
2021	Hitman 3	Nintendo Switch, Nintendo Switch 2, PlayStation 4, PlayStation 5, Stadia, Windows, Xbox One, Xbox Series X/S	IO Interactive
2026	007 First Light	Nintendo Switch 2, PlayStation 5, Windows, Xbox Series X/S	IO Interactive
2027	Hitman Classic Trilogy Remastered	PlayStation 5, Windows, Xbox Series X/S	Saber Interactive
TBA	Project Fantasy (working title)	TBA	IO Interactive

=== Games published ===
Year	Title	Platform(s)	Developer(s)
2025	MindsEye (Note: Publishing duties transferred to Build a Rocket Boy in March 2026)	PlayStation 5, Windows, Xbox Series X/S	Build A Rocket Boy

=== Cancelled games ===
- Rex Dominus
- Unannounced game for Microsoft (2009)

=== Glacier ===
Glacier is a proprietary in-house game engine developed for the Hitman series, Freedom Fighters, the Kane & Lynch series, Mini Ninjas, and 007 First Light. Glacier supports DLSS, XeSS and FSR. The engine supports ray tracing in Hitman 3. Eidos-Montréal licensed Glacier for their own in-house engine, Dawn Engine.
