= Mini Ninjas =

2009 video game

- European cover art
- Developer: IO Interactive (Note: Nintendo DS and iOS versions developed by Magic Pockets. OS X version by Robosoft Technologies.)
- Publisher: Eidos Interactive (Note: Co-published in North America by Warner Bros. Interactive Entertainment. Mac OS X version by Feral Interactive and iOS version by Square Enix Europe.)
- Director: Jeremy C. Petreman
- Producers: Jonas Lind; Luke Valentine
- Designers: Ulrik Hauen-Limkilde; Thor Frølich; Thomas Løfgren
- Artists: Henrik Hansen; Michael Helmuth Hansen; Søren Bech Jensen
- Composers: Peter Svarre; Frédéric Motte (DS); Anthony N. Putson (mobile); Allister Brimble (mobile)
- Engine: Glacier
- Platforms: Microsoft Windows, PlayStation 3, Wii, Xbox 360, Nintendo DS, Mac OS X, iOS
- Release: NA: September 8, 2009; EU: September 11, 2009; AU: September 24, 2009; OS X July 8, 2010; Mini Ninjas Adventures; June 29, 2012 iOS; February 12, 2013
- Genre: Action-adventure
- Mode: Single-player

Mini Ninjas is a 2009 action-adventure video game developed by IO Interactive and published by Eidos Interactive for Microsoft Windows, Nintendo DS, PlayStation 3, Wii and Xbox 360. A Mac OS X version of the game was released on July 8, 2010, by Feral Interactive. In December 2011, it was announced that the game would be also made available as a browser game for Google Chrome.

A Kinect/Xbox Live Arcade spin-off game Mini Ninjas Adventures followed in 2012. Another Mini Ninjas spin-off game, an endless runner titled Mini Ninjas Mobile, was released for iOS and Android smartphones and tablets in 2013.

A Shield Android TV port was released in 2017.

== Gameplay ==
Wii gameplay screenshot with Hiro

Mini Ninjas is a linear third-person action-adventure game. It features six playable Mini Ninja characters, each with their own unique abilities, weapons and skills. Players can collect special weapons, including caltrops, shuriken, different bombs and fishing rods, and a multi-functional ninja hat, as well as a variety of potions and food items. The main protagonist, Hiro, can cast spells, including fireball and lighting attacks, camouflage, and time manipulation. Hiro can also possess spirits, such as animals, for a short period of time. Spells are cast using Ki, which is dropped by enemies and can be replenished with potions.

The enemies in Mini Ninjas are animals enchanted by the main antagonist, turning them into samurai warriors. When defeated, the curse is broken and the enemies return to their previous animal form, and can assist the player. For example, brown bears can attack with their claws, warthogs charge at enemies, and panda bears can slam into the ground. All animals have a keen sense of smell for spotting ingredients and collectibles in places that are easily overlooked. Other enemies in the game include ghosts, which approach the player and attempt to drain their life force.

Throughout their journey, players can collect coins and ingredients, such as mushrooms, flowers, and ginseng roots. They can exchange these coins for weapons and recipes from the Tengu, crow-like humanoids who also give quests and advice. Fruits found on trees or bushes can be harvested by shaking the bushes or the trunk of trees, which will restore their health. Other foods like sushi do the same thing.

Scattered throughout the world are ancient shrines, each containing a scroll that grants Hiro a new spell. There are also 100 Jizo statues hidden throughout the game, which can be collected for special achievements or trophies.

== Plot ==
In ancient Japan, an era of peace and harmony has existed ever since the evil samurai warlord Ashida was defeated at the hand of a wise ninja master. In the wake of Ashida's defeat, the ninja master hid the secrets of Kuji magic, which grants one power over nature, in various scrolls contained in shrines across the wilderness. Three centuries later, at Ninja Mountain, the ninja master has trained six orphans in the way of the ninja with the aid of the mountain's tengu inhabitants. The youngest of these ninjas, Hiro, possesses the power to control Kuji magic. Hiro lives on the mountain in peace alongside his friends - clumsy but strong Futo, flute-playing Suzume, archer Shun, tiger-like Tora, and spear-wielding Kunoichi.

The long-lasting peace begins to slowly erode when mysterious events begin to occur across the countryside, including the disappearance of animals and sightings of armored samurai in the wilderness. The ninja master eventually learns that Ashida has returned, and is using Kuji magic to convert forest animals into deadly samurai warriors. The ninja master sends Kunoichi, Tora, Shun, and Suzume to investigate Ashida's army, but all are captured behind enemy lines. Reluctantly, the ninja master then sends out his last ninjas, Hiro and Futo, after teaching Hiro how to learn Kuji spells from the hidden shrines across the country. Hiro and Futo rescue Suzume from the samurai and infiltrate the Earth Castle, where they defeat an enormous samurai boss; subsequently, the castle explodes, and Ashida becomes aware of the existence of the new ninjas.

Hiro and his allies continue to push through the wilderness, encountering many dangers, including new varieties of samurai with unique powers, as well as tortured spirits which try to steal their life force. Along the way, they find and rescue Shun, Tora, and Kunoichi from the clutches of the samurai. The ninjas reach the Night Castle and defeat its boss, subsequently doing the same for the Water Castle and the Snow Castle. An outraged Ashida taunts the ninjas to come face him at his fortress, located atop a volcano. The ninjas reach Ashida's castle, which he animates using Kuji, turning it into an enormous monstrosity. The ninjas are able to infiltrate the castle, where Hiro confronts and defeats Ashida, who falls to his death in the volcano. Peace restored in the land, the ninjas return triumphantly to Ninja Mountain.

== Development and release ==
Mini Ninjas was announced on January 19, 2009, along with the first official trailer. The game's origin lies in the developers' desires to make a game that they could "play with their kids", and thus bears the lowest ESRB rating ever given to a game developed by IO Interactive, Everyone 10+, a major departure from its other games that target older audiences.

The game was released in North America on September 8, 2009, and in the United Kingdom and PAL territories on September 11, 2009, for Microsoft Windows, Nintendo DS, PlayStation 3, Wii, and Xbox 360. A version for Mac OS X, developed by Feral Interactive, was released on July 8, 2010.

== Reception ==
Mini Ninjas

Aggregate score
Aggregator	Score					
Aggregator	DS	Macintosh	PC	PS3	Wii	Xbox 360
Metacritic	61/100	N/A	74/100	73/100	79/100	73/100

Review scores
Publication	Score					
Publication	DS	Macintosh	PC	PS3	Wii	Xbox 360
Edge	N/A	N/A	N/A	N/A	N/A	7/10
Eurogamer	N/A	N/A	N/A	N/A	N/A	6/10
Game Informer	N/A	N/A	N/A	7.5/10	N/A	7.5/10
GameRevolution	N/A	N/A	N/A	C+	N/A	C+
GamesMaster	N/A	N/A	N/A	N/A	N/A	65%
GameSpot	N/A	N/A	7.5/10	7.5/10	N/A	7.5/10
IGN	4/10	N/A	8/10	8/10	7.6/10	8/10
MacLife	N/A	4/5	N/A	N/A	N/A	N/A
Macworld	N/A	4/5	N/A	N/A	N/A	N/A
Nintendo Power	6/10	N/A	N/A	N/A	7.5/10	N/A
Official Xbox Magazine (UK)	N/A	N/A	N/A	N/A	N/A	7/10
PC Gamer (UK)	N/A	N/A	71%	N/A	N/A	N/A
PlayStation: The Official Magazine	N/A	N/A	N/A	3/5	N/A	N/A
The Guardian	N/A	N/A	4/5	4/5	4/5	4/5
The Daily Telegraph	N/A	N/A	N/A	7/10	N/A	N/A
Teletext GameCentral	N/A	N/A	N/A	6/10	N/A	N/A

The game received "mixed or average reviews" on all platforms except the Wii version, which received "generally favorable reviews", according to the review aggregation website Metacritic.

GameSpot said of the game, "Whether you're big or small, there's a lot to like about these little ninjas and their lengthy journey." The Guardian concluded that the game's "constant charm renders it calming and even relaxing to play" and "any parent watching Mini Ninjas being played will find it hard to resist the temptation to have a go over their own." Sean Garmer of 411Mania gave the Xbox 360 version a score of eight out of ten, calling it "a very good first effort from IO Interactive. The story will keep you involved and they added plenty of things to try to extend it. The cuteness and comedy also makes this game rather humorous, which is something I was surprised about. I didn't find anything really wrong with the game, other than a needed co-op and the possible eventual tedium of the button mashing."

Aceinet of GameZone gave the PS3 version 8.1 out of 10, saying, "Mini Ninjas is about having fun. It might not be the best game on the market but it should provide plenty of fun and enjoyment for almost any gamer." However, Joseph DeLia gave the Xbox 360 version 6 out of 10, saying, "While the vibrant visuals, easily manageable combat and light-hearted mood might enamor some, Mini Ninjas is just too repetitive, short and bereft of features to make it stand out."

Tora was featured among the top ten ninja characters for PlayStation consoles by Play UK in 2010. In 2012, CraveOnline included Mini Ninjas on their list of five "badass ninja games" as "a quality ninja game that can be enjoyed with the whole family kids", adding that its "best aspect was, without a doubt, how slain enemies burst into cute animals instead of blood clouds. Super adorable."

== Other media ==
=== Mini Ninjas Adventures ===
In March 2012, Square Enix, who preside over Eidos Interactive, filed a trademark in Europe for Mini Ninjas: Hiro's Adventure and created a domain "minininjashirosadventure.com." That trademark was announced to be Mini Ninjas Adventures, a spin-off Kinect game for the Xbox Live Arcade exclusively, developed by Sidekick studio and released on June 29, 2012.

==== Reception ====
Mini Ninjas Adventures

Aggregate score
Aggregator	Score
Metacritic	65/100

Review scores
Publication	Score
4Players	55%
GameZone	7/10
Official Xbox Magazine (UK)	7/10
Official Xbox Magazine (US)	5.5/10

Mini Ninjas Adventures received "mixed" reviews according to Metacritic.

=== Mini Ninjas Mobile ===
Another spin-off game, entitled Mini Ninjas Mobile, was released for iOS and Android in 2013.

==== Reception ====
Mini Ninjas Mobile

Aggregate score
Aggregator	Score
Metacritic	64/100

Review scores
Publication	Score
Edge	5/10
GamesMaster	79%
Pocket Gamer	2.5/5
Digital Spy	2/5

Mini Ninjas Mobile received "mixed" reviews according to Metacritic.

=== Animated series ===
4Kids licensed the rights to the franchise in 2009. In 2013, a cartoon series adaptation of Mini Ninjas in production by Cyber Group Studios was announced as coming soon. The series aired in 2015 on various networks and broadcasters under the name Mini Ninjas.

== Sources ==
- Michael Knight, Mini Ninjas: Prima Official Game Guide, Random House Information Group, 2009.
