= Hitman: Blood Money =

2006 video game

- Steam cover artwork
- Developer: IO Interactive (Note: Reprisal version developed by Feral Interactive)
- Publisher: Eidos Interactive (Note: Square Enix Europe published the PlayStation 3 version, while Warner Bros. Interactive Entertainment published the Xbox One and PlayStation 4 versions, and Feral Interactive published the Reprisal version.)
- Director: Rasmus Højengaard
- Producer: Helle Marijnissen
- Artist: Tore Blystad
- Writer: Greg Nagan
- Composer: Jesper Kyd
- Series: Hitman
- Platforms: Microsoft Windows; PlayStation 2; Xbox; Xbox 360; PlayStation 3; PlayStation 4; Xbox One; Android; iOS; Nintendo Switch
- Release: 26 May 2006: PlayStation 2, Xbox, Xbox 360, Windows; EU: 26 May 2006; NA: 30 May 2006; AU: 1 June 2006; PlayStation 3; NA: 29 January 2013; AU: 31 January 2013; EU: 1 February 2013; PlayStation 4, Xbox One; WW: 11 January 2019; Android, iOS; WW: 30 November 2023; Nintendo Switch; WW: 25 January 2024
- Genre: Stealth
- Mode: Single-player

Hitman: Blood Money is a 2006 stealth video game developed by IO Interactive and published by Eidos Interactive. It was released in May 2006 for Microsoft Windows, PlayStation 2, Xbox and Xbox 360. It is the fourth installment in the Hitman video game series, and the sequel to 2004's Hitman: Contracts. The story follows cloned assassin Agent 47's efforts to bring down the Franchise, a rival contract killing organization that is threatening his employers, the International Contract Agency (ICA), and seeking to obtain the same cloning technology that created 47. Meanwhile, a frame story presents 47's life and various contracts he carried out, as narrated by a former FBI director to a journalist.

Blood Money received critical acclaim for its graphics, narrative, gameplay, voice acting and darker tone; it was also a commercial success, selling more than 2.1 million copies. It has gained a cult following and is considered one of the greatest video games ever made. High-definition ports of Blood Money and two of its predecessors, Hitman 2: Silent Assassin and Contracts, were released on PlayStation 3 and Xbox 360 in January 2013 as the Hitman HD Trilogy. A sequel, Hitman: Absolution, was released in 2012, and 4K remastered ports of both Blood Money and Absolution were released by Warner Bros. Interactive Entertainment in 2019 on the PlayStation 4 and Xbox One as part of the Hitman HD Enhanced Collection.

== Gameplay ==
Agent 47 disguised as a security guard, sneaking up on the target, Don Fernando Delgado

As with previous installments, Hitman: Blood Money has the player control series protagonist Agent 47, who is assigned various targets to assassinate in order to complete missions. Armed guards, security checkpoints, witnesses and other obstacles attempt to prohibit Agent 47's success. The player guides Agent 47 through the game's levels from a third-person perspective. A map showing each topographical area and the location of targets and characters assists the player. To complete his mission, Agent 47 uses multiple methods to eliminate targets, regardless of witnesses or violence to bystanders. Blood Money penalizes players for making too much noise or being too violent.

New features introduced in Blood Money included the ability to climb over obstacles, improved unarmed combat, the use of non-player characters (NPC) as human shields, the ability to dispose of or conceal bodies, improved character animations, a new game engine, and the ability to upgrade weapons and equipment. Five of the featured weapons in the game, and some pieces of equipment, can be upgraded.

Every level in Blood Money contains a method to make the target's death look like an accident, such as tampering with a grill to make it explode when it is turned on, rigging a chandelier to fall on a target or pushing a target off a balcony. Agent 47 can improvise weapons to complete missions, such as nail guns, toy air rifles, knives, screwdrivers, stilettos, swordsticks, fire extinguishers, hammers, and hedge clippers.

Blood Money introduced a notoriety system that rises and falls based upon Agent 47's success. The higher Agent 47's notoriety, the easier it is for NPCs to identify him. If Agent 47 is captured on camera surveillance or witnessed committing murder, the character's notoriety will rise. If the player executes a mission perfectly, Agent 47's notoriety will be minimal. Blood Money provides players with methods to reduce Agent 47's notoriety, including destroying surveillance equipment and bribery. Notoriety gained in early missions will affect later missions. The player receives payment upon completion of a mission, which can be used to upgrade weapons, or bribe authorities to lower their notoriety score. The amount of money the player receives depends on how cleanly the assassination is carried out, with silent killings with no witnesses receiving the highest payout.

Upon completion of each mission, a newspaper article is displayed containing the mission's results, Agent 47's notoriety level, the weapon most frequently used and how accurately it was used, the number of police, security, and civilians killed or injured, and the existence of witnesses. Sketches of Agent 47's face are displayed and become more accurate as the character's notoriety grows: if the notoriety system is disabled, or if the player remains unseen throughout the mission, the article shows a picture of the mission's target in place of the sketch. Players are awarded ratings based upon the success of the mission, such as a designation of "silent assassin" when the target was assassinated as cleanly and quietly as possible.

Blood Money improved the melee combat system from previous releases, allowing players to disarm as well as lethally throw weapons at NPCs. Unlike previous games, melee weapons cannot be collected in the player's armory. Blood Money also introduces rival assassins.

== Plot ==
American journalist Rick Henderson visits the estate of former FBI Director Alexander Leland "Jack" Cayne, in hopes of interviewing him over an attack at the White House and his career. However, Cayne reveals that the interview was merely a ruse, and that Rick was invited to be given the details concerning a far greater story – the full details on cloned hitman Agent 47, a contract killer for the International Contract Agency (ICA), a global organisation involved in assassinations. Although skeptical over the existence of 47, who is deemed an urban myth, Rick decides to listen to Cayne's story, reading documents he provides about a number of contracts committed by 47.

The documents reveal that after 47 had committed an assassination against a bankrupt amusement park owner in Baltimore, Maryland, he went abroad to conduct jobs in Chile and France, assigned to him by his handler Diana Burnwood, before taking on several across the United States. During this time, the ICA found itself being targeted by a rival outfit called "the Franchise", who soon began killing ICA agents while hunting down 47. Although 47 avoids being killed by rival assassins, Diana is forced to shut down the ICA, and divides up its remaining resources between him and herself. Cayne eventually goes on to talk about the White House attack, claiming 47 was involved in the chaos that occurred, but was ultimately brought down by his handler as the law closed in on him.

Unknown to Cayne, 47 had been made aware that the Franchise was working for a political organization that sought to monopolize on Ort-Meyer's cloning technology. As the current US president was planning to legalize cloning, the Franchise was hired to assassinate him so that their puppet, the U.S. Vice President, would replace him; 47 found himself hired by Carlton Smith, a CIA agent whom he rescued on multiple occasions, to prevent this. With the Franchise exposed, Diana decided to bring down the outfit with a risky plan by pretending to double-cross 47 and injecting him with poison – in reality a serum to induce a hibernatory state that mimics death, so that he could be brought close to those involved in the Franchise.

As 47's bone marrow could be used by the organization's rivals, Cayne, the head of the Franchise, was ordered to find him and kill him. To ensure his marrow cannot be recovered, Cayne had him prepared for cremation, and brings Rick to watch the ceremony. However, Diana takes an opportunity in the ceremony to give 47 the antidote to the serum, allowing him to wake and kill everyone present. With 47's anonymity preserved, Diana steals the Franchise's assets to reopen the ICA, while 47 proceeds to take on his next contract.

== Development ==
Hitman: Blood Money was announced in November 2004, with a scheduled release for Spring 2005. However, the date was later delayed into 2006. In March 2006, it was revealed that the game would be released on the Xbox 360, making it the first Hitman game to be released on the seventh generation of video game consoles. Blood Money was released on the PlayStation 2, Xbox, Xbox 360 and Microsoft Windows on 26 May 2006 in Europe, 30 May in North America, and 1 June in Australia. The game, along with its predecessors, was made available on Steam in March 2007. On 29 January 2013, Blood Money was included in the Hitman HD Trilogy, a compilation also including Hitman 2: Silent Assassin and Hitman: Contracts, released for the PlayStation 3 and Xbox 360. In March 2018, the Xbox 360 version of the game was made backwards compatible for the Xbox One. Blood Money was also included in another compilation, the Hitman HD Enhanced Collection, with Hitman: Absolution, which was released on the PlayStation 4 and Xbox One in January 2019. This version of the game was remastered with updated visuals and could be played in 4K resolution. A port titled Hitman: Blood Money — Reprisal was released for iOS and Android on 30 November 2023 and for Nintendo Switch on 25 January 2024. The new port introduced revised controls and new features found in later Hitman titles, such as the mini-map and Instinct Mode.

== Soundtrack ==
Hitman: Blood Money Original Soundtrack

Soundtrack album by Jesper Kyd
- Released: 30 May 2006
- Genres: Electronica; Western classical; choral; ambient
- Length: 64:41
- Label: Sumthing Distribution

Jesper Kyd chronology
Splinter Cell: Chaos Theory (2005)	Hitman: Blood Money Original Soundtrack (2006)	Kane & Lynch: Dead Men (2007)

Professional ratings
Review scores
Source	Rating
Soundtrack.Net	3/5 stars

The Hitman: Blood Money Original Soundtrack, composed by Jesper Kyd, was released on 30 May 2006 by Sumthing Else and Eidos. The score was performed with the Budapest Symphony Orchestra and the Hungarian Radio Choir. It features Kyd's trademark ambience and dark, foreboding arrangements with the choral parts in deep brooding Latin. It is Kyd's final contribution to the series after composing the previous three Hitman soundtracks.

Matt Scheller of Soundtrack.Net gave the soundtrack 3/5 stars; despite the fact that "the more orchestral approach hits home to me more so than the electronic stuff", he enjoys the work of Jesper Kyd never-the-less, and Blood Money "is a real treat for me in that this is the return of a primarily orchestral score". Even though "it's not as thematic as the first of the Hitman games, there is enough material here that will satisfy most soundtrack collectors". Despite the orchestral focus, "there are plenty of rhythms and beats that accompany the orchestral palette", such as "Club Heaven" that "features some pretty standard 'nightclub' techno". However, Scheller states that a lot of tracks are, "at times, wall-to-wall music" that accompany Agent 47 during various stages; but sums up that "I find that the more I listen to the album, the more enjoyable it becomes".

The soundtrack was nominated for the Best Video Game Score at the 2006 MTV Video Music Awards, losing to The Elder Scrolls IV: Oblivion. It received the "Xbox Game of the Year-Best Original Score" award from IGN.

No.	Title	Length
1.	"Apocalypse"	4:33
2.	"Secret Invasion"	5:06
3.	"Before the Storm"	2:40
4.	"47 Attacks"	2:12
5.	"Hunter"	6:21
6.	"Action in Paris"	3:10
7.	"Amb Zone"	3:56
8.	"Night Time in New Orleans"	3:17
9.	"Vegas"	6:28
10.	"Club Heaven"	5:52
11.	"Invasion on the Mississippi River"	4:15
12.	"Rocky Mountains"	2:41
13.	"Day Light in New Orleans"	4:43
14.	"Trouble in Vegas"	3:35
15.	"Funeral"	2:47
16.	"Main Title"	3:05
Total length:		64:41

Additional music includes a rendition of Franz Schubert's "Ave Maria" sung by Daniel Perret of the Zurich Boys' Choir, a rendition of "Tomorrow Never Dies" by Swan Lee, "White Noise" by the Vacation, "Slasher" by Institute for the Criminally Insane, and a Bach's Cello Suite No. 1 in G Major.

== Reception ==
Hitman: Blood Money reviews

Aggregate score
Aggregator	Score
Metacritic	(PS2) 83/100 (PC) 82/100 (X360) 82/100 (Xbox) 81/100

Review scores
Publication	Score
1Up.com	B+
Eurogamer	8/10
GameSpot	8.2/10
GameSpy	4.5/5
GamesRadar+	4/5
GameTrailers	7.9/10
GameZone	8.5/10
IGN	8/10
PC Zone	84/100
TeamXbox	7.6/10
VideoGamer.com	8/10

Hitman: Blood Money received "generally positive" reviews across all platforms, according to review aggregator platform Metacritic.

GameSpot reported that diverse imaginative scenarios gave Blood Money its share of violent thrills. GameSpy praised the expanded scope and options in each level, such as making kills appear as accidents, saying the game provided enough choices to encourage players to play missions multiple times," but criticized the notoriety system as "underutilized."

IGN praised Blood Money's "impressive orchestral compositions." GameTrailers wrote that the soundtrack "drives your emotions" through the missions."

In contrary to this praise, TeamXbox criticized Blood Money for offering no innovations from its predecessor Hitman: Contracts.

Hitman: Blood Money sold more than 1.5 million copies by July 17, 2006. By 2011, it had sold more than 2.1 million copies.

=== Controversy ===
Several advertisements promoting Blood Money generated controversy for their violent imagery. The ad that drew the most attention depicted a woman lying on a bed in lingerie, seemingly asleep but with a bullet hole in her forehead, and with the caption "Beautifully Executed" above the picture; it was criticized for promoting murder, with one commentator saying they were in "extremely poor taste". Other ads were "Classically Executed" which featured a cellist who has been executed with a garrote, "Coldly Executed" which showed a body in a freezer, and "Shockingly Executed" which depicted a woman electrocuted in a bath by a toaster.

In August 2008, the government of Thailand tagged Hitman a violent video game, along with numerous others, including Resident Evil 4 and, most especially, GTA IV, which had obsessed an 18-year-old man who murdered a taxi driver in Bangkok that month.

== See also ==
- List of video games listed among the best
