= Kane & Lynch: Dead Men =

2007 video game

- Cover art featuring Kane (left) and Lynch (right)
- Developer: IO Interactive
- Publisher: Eidos Interactive
- Director: Jens Peter Kurup
- Producer: Hugh Grimley
- Artist: Martin Kramme Guldbæk
- Writers: Jens Peter Kurup; Martin Vestergaard Madsen; Oliver Winding
- Composers: Jesper Kyd; Peter Peter; Peter Kyed
- Engine: Glacier
- Platforms: Microsoft Windows, PlayStation 3, Xbox 360
- Release: NA: November 13, 2007; EU: November 23, 2007; AU: December 6, 2007
- Genre: Third-person shooter
- Modes: Single, Co-op and multiplayer

Kane & Lynch: Dead Men is a 2007 third-person shooter video game developed by IO Interactive and published by Eidos Interactive in North America and PAL regions, and Spike in Japan, for Microsoft Windows, PlayStation 3 and Xbox 360. The mobile phone version was developed by Kiloo and published by Eidos Mobile.

The game was received with mixed reviews, and spawned a sequel, Kane & Lynch 2: Dog Days. As of January 11, 2008, the game has sold over 1 million copies.

== Gameplay ==
A screenshot of Kane & Lynch: Dead Men. Kane is armed with a SG 552 carbine while taking cover behind a TMPD squad car during a combat sequence.

In campaign mode the player controls Kane. The player is accompanied by Lynch, and sometimes other hired mercenaries. Co-op mode is available, in which the second player controls Lynch. Though almost identical to Kane's style of gameplay, Lynch has short bursts of aggression in which he hallucinates nearly all non-playable characters are police, some sporting an animal's head. Lynch carries a shotgun and a revolver as side arm, while Kane carries an assault rifle and standard pistol, though it is possible to swap weapons. Additional weapons such as grenades, sniper rifles and carbines can be picked up, which can be swapped between allies. The player can take cover by standing next to a wall, and can blindfire. While having hired mercenaries, the player can issue orders such as follow, move to a specific position, or attack.

=== Fragile Alliance ===
Fragile Alliance is the game's online multiplayer mode, which consists of four maps: Hot Coffee, Late Night Opening, Withdrawal and A Walk In The Park. A free-to-download map pack released on PlayStation Network and Xbox Live provides four additional maps. The goal is to finish a several round match with the most money. Each round begins with all of the players as armed, balaclava-clad robbers. Money can be used to buy better firearms and armor. Resistance is met in the form of armed AI controlled security guards and/or police officers. A player's money acts as a shield, but will quickly be dropped on the ground as the player is injured. To escape the level, a player must survive to meet a getaway vehicle. All players who survive without turning on their allies will split stolen money evenly.

On the Xbox 360 and PC versions, a player's appearance in the game is influenced by their TrueSkill rank while playing ranked matches. Players who have reached TrueSkill rank #1 and #2 will play as Kane and Lynch, respectively. Unlike Kane and Lynch's campaign mode, players cannot sprint. If a player feels they have taken enough money to become a target for potential traitors, they can drop some of their money, becoming less of a scoring threat.

== Plot ==
The game opens with a voiceover of ex-mercenary Adam 'Kane' Marcus (voiced by Brian Bloom), reading a letter addressed to his daughter Jenny. Kane is traveling to death row after being convicted of manslaughter. Another death row inmate, James Seth Lynch (voiced by Jarion Monroe), lets on there will be a breakout. Their truck is involved in a head-on collision by a group of mercenaries. The two are taken to a construction site, where they are confronted by four members of a gang of criminals called The7, led by The Brothers and their henchmen Carlos (a close friend of Kane) and Mute. They accuse Kane of stealing money from them, and reveal that they have taken his wife and daughter hostage. Kane is given three weeks to retrieve the money or his wife and daughter will be killed.

Kane and Lynch are dropped off at an abandoned mall, where they are given supplies and a vehicle. However, police officers arrive and the two are forced to shoot their way out. Later, Kane explains that he did not steal from The7, but knows who did, and where they hid it. Kane and Lynch rob a local bank where the money is being kept. Only half of the money is in the bank's safe, but Kane believes he knows where the other half is. Meanwhile, Lynch, who is revealed to suffer from mental illness and periodic episodes of violent psychosis, blacks out and kills all of the hostages after his medication wears off, forcing Kane and Lynch to shoot their way out and flee in a van. Losing the police in the subway after the van crashes, Kane informs Lynch that they need to go to Tokyo to retrieve the other half of the money.

In Tokyo, the pair go after Retomoto, a Japanese crime lord, by kidnapping his daughter Yoko as ransom. While Kane is negotiating with Retomoto over the phone and despite Retomoto even initially offering an uneasy alliance against The7, Lynch accidentally shoots and kills Yoko while trying to stop her from escaping. Kane, Lynch, and The7's hired guns then proceed to escape from Retomoto's hitmen. Kane is furious with Lynch, but he realizes that they are out of time and must return to The7 with only half of the money.

Lynch reveals to Kane that he made a deal with The7 to betray Kane in order to ensure his survival as well as a position within The7, but he is also betrayed and knocked unconscious at the construction site where Kane and his family are to be executed. The leaders of The7 deny Kane's plea for additional time, after which The Brothers and Carlos depart for Havana, leaving Mute to carry out the executions. After being brought to the construction site along with her daughter, Kane's wife expresses her disgust with Kane, but Mute executes her before he has a chance to answer her, even though The7 promised to let Kane speak with her. Regaining consciousness, Lynch attacks his kidnappers while an enraged Kane beats Mute to death. Kane and Lynch then protect Kane's daughter Jenny from The7's reinforcements as she cries over her mother's body.

Kane buries his wife and decides to finish off The7 to ensure his daughter's safety. Kane and Lynch free a group of "Dead Men" from prison: Rific, Thapa, and Shelly. These men had been wronged by The7 and join the duo to get revenge, although Shelly expresses resentment at working with Lynch, who he recognizes; he reveals that Lynch may have killed his own wife. Before flying to Havana, they return to Tokyo and kill Retomoto, reclaiming the rest of the money to finance their war with The7. In Havana, Kane keeps everyone motivated with promises of payment as they track down The Brothers and Carlos. Kane informs Lynch that The7 profit from assisting factions in civil wars, with Havana supposedly the last job needed for their retirement. They find themselves caught up in an ongoing civil war, joining the Cuban Revolutionary Armed Forces and battling The7's forces that are attempting to stage a coup d'état. They find Carlos, abandoned by The Brothers. Kane recruits him, but Thapa abandons the mission as a result.

The Dead Men fight their way through the Venezuelan jungle, and locate The Brothers at their compound. Shelly demands the payment that Kane claimed he would get for helping him. Carlos tells Shelly and Rific that there is plenty of heroin in the village that they can take as a compensation. Carlos then volunteers to go on ahead and open the gates with an explosive, but vanishes once inside, making Lynch think that Carlos lured them into a trap. However, Kane and Lynch discover over Carlos's radio that The7 have captured Jenny again. They discover Jenny unharmed, along with Carlos's corpse. They suddenly get ambushed by The Brothers and their mercenaries, but manage to kill The Elder Brother. The Younger Brother, however, manages to escape with Jenny and attempts to take off in an airplane.

Kane and Lynch follow in a car and disable the plane's engines before killing the Younger Brother. Jenny then pulls a gun on Kane and blames him for her mother's death. Kane tells her that whether she hates him or not, he will get her to safety. Kane is then given the choice of rescuing Rific and Shelly from the village church, where they are pinned down by The7's mercenaries, or escaping with Jenny and leaving them to die.

If Kane boards the helicopter with Jenny and leaves Rific and Shelly to die, Jenny will resent her father for leaving his men and tell him that she hates him. They escape in the helicopter, leaving Lynch.

In the other ending, Kane chooses to rescue Rific and Shelly, who are trapped in a burning church towering over a village. Kane and Lynch are too late to save Rific, but Shelly is still alive. As they escape to the pier, Jenny is shot, and Kane carries her body along. Shelly loses his patience and attempts to escape on a boat alone but appears to be killed by an explosion, although his boat is seen leaving the pier. Lynch is shot as he escapes on an undamaged boat with Kane, while Jenny's status is unknown. The boat drifts slowly with the river, while Kane holds Jenny and whispers to her about the letter he tried to send her.

== Development ==
For the development of Kane & Lynch: Dead Men, Jesper Kyd was brought in to write the musical score for the game, having written scores for the Hitman series and Freedom Fighters. IO Interactive also brought local musicians Peter Peter, and Peter Kyed to do additional work on the score. The two were known in the Danish film industry for their work on Nicolas Winding Refn's Pusher Trilogy and Valhalla Rising. Kyd arranged the soundtrack and handled the main theme and recurring pieces for the game, while the Peters worked on the music for each mission.

The game was originally going to revolve around Kane, with Lynch acting as a sidekick. But as the development went on, they decided to include Lynch in the story. Martin Guldbaek, the art director for the game, said that for creating each of the locations, the team went to Los Angeles for photographs. They combined this with concept artwork to create "locations that matched the character's mood and perspective". Anders Poulsen was the lead character artist. According to him, he wanted to make characters "like no other". Kane was the first character to be designed, but was very different from his final appearance. When Lynch was brought in, it added more "life" to Kane's character.

The game went gold on October 31, 2007, making the release date a full 10 days earlier.

Kane is voiced by Brian Bloom and Lynch is voiced by Jarion Monroe.

=== Downloadable content ===
Downloadable content was made available for Kane & Lynch on April 17, 2008, entitled "The Dope Bag". This contained four new maps: Clean Cut, Hooker's Trail, Flying High, and Hasta La Vista, plus adding 250 Gamerscore for the Xbox 360 version bringing the total to 1250.

=== Audio ===
The Kane & Lynch: Dead Men Original Soundtrack was composed, arranged, and produced by Jesper Kyd. Danish musicians, Peter Peter and Peter Kyed, who are most known for their work with Nicolas Winding Refn's earlier films, including his Pusher trilogy, and his Netflix series; Copenhagen Cowboy. While the soundtrack was never released physically or digitally, certain pieces of music can be found on YouTube. The special edition of Kane & Lynch: Dead Men contains a bonus disc with six tracks.

=== Mobile phone adaptation ===
The mobile shooter runs players through 38 levels across five different scenarios, such as a bank or nightclub mission. Players control one of the men while the other follows, offering cover and support.

== Reception ==
Reception

Aggregate score
Aggregator	Score		
Aggregator	PC	PS3	Xbox 360
Metacritic	67/100	64/100	65/100

Review scores
Publication	Score		
Publication	PC	PS3	Xbox 360
Destructoid	N/A	N/A	3/10
Electronic Gaming Monthly	N/A	N/A	7.17/10
Eurogamer	N/A	N/A	7/10
Game Informer	N/A	7/10	7/10
GamePro	N/A	N/A	3/5
GameRevolution	N/A	C+	N/A
GameSpot	N/A	6/10	6/10
GameSpy	N/A	N/A	3/5
GameTrailers	8/10	8/10	8/10
GameZone	N/A	5.5/10	7/10
IGN	7/10	(US) 7/10 (AU) 6.5/10	7/10
Official Xbox Magazine (US)	N/A	N/A	8/10
PC Gamer (US)	58%	N/A	N/A
PlayStation: The Official Magazine	N/A	3.5/5	N/A
The A.V. Club	N/A	N/A	C−

Kane & Lynch: Dead Men received "mixed or average reviews" on all platforms according to video game review aggregator platform Metacritic.

GameTrailers stated that although there are some flaws, the package as a whole made it "easy to recommend". On the other end of the scale, NTSC-uk called the game "a sickly mess of a game with the multitude of negatives undermining every positive".

The Australian magazine PC PowerPlay cited "great dialogue", "impressive locations" and "satisfying action" as highlights, while criticising its length and the final act of the game, suggesting it "loses ambition" compared to the earlier parts of the game which "[took] some pages out of Mann's notebook". Edge gave the Xbox 360 version a score of six out of ten, stating that "its scenarios are striking in scope, but its gunplay can't quite keep pace. It features some moments of truly cinematic vision, but the technology and framework can't quite do them full justice". In Japan, Famitsu gave the PS3 and Xbox 360 versions a score of one eight and three sevens, for a total of 29 out of 40.

=== GameSpot controversy ===
After GameSpot editor Jeff Gerstmann gave the game a 6/10 review, pressure from Eidos Interactive, a major advertiser for the site, caused GameSpot's upper management to fire him. Initially, GameSpot responded to the resulting controversy by denying that Eidos influenced the firing. However, as of March 2012, the non-disclosure agreement that forced Gerstmann to withhold the details of his termination was nullified. Not long after, Giant Bomb (a site Gerstmann founded after leaving GameSpot) was being purchased by the same parent company as GameSpot, and that they moved their headquarters into the same building. As part of this announcement, Gerstmann revealed that the firing was indeed related to threats of Eidos pulling advertising revenue away from GameSpot as a result of Gerstmann's poor review score, which was confirmed by GameSpot's Jon Davison.

== Sequel ==
Eidos announced a sequel, titled Kane & Lynch 2: Dog Days. It was released in August 2010 on PC, PlayStation 3, and Xbox 360 to middling reviews, though it generally scored higher than the original Kane & Lynch. Dog Days opted for a guerilla style, handheld camcorder instead of the traditional, static third-person camera. The visual style also included a mid-1990's VHS tracking effect, along with a washed out color palette that gave the game a found footage look.

A PlayStation Portable and Nintendo DS versions of Kane & Lynch title was in development during 2007, called Kane and Lynch Tactics. The game was never officially announced and it was cancelled for unknown reasons.

== Other media ==
A film adaptation was in the works from Lionsgate. The script was written by Kyle Ward. Bruce Willis and Jamie Foxx had signed on for the role of Kane and Lynch respectively. The film was to be directed by F. Gary Gray and originally slated for a release in 2011 but delayed to 2013. It did not release in 2013, and no further release dates have been announced.

A script sent to the game site Kotaku was reviewed, although it was a rough draft, and revealed that the character of Lynch was changed to a man with eloquent vocabulary with no psychotic tendencies. Since then it has been changed for rewrites and different directors. In November 2013, other actors Gerard Butler and Vin Diesel were in talks for the title roles with a script by Skip Woods and Kyle Ward and produced by Adrian Askarieh and Daniel Alter.

In May 2010, IO Interactive announced a deal that would see a comic version of Kane & Lynch published under the DC Comics imprint WildStorm. The storyline is "not for the faint-hearted" and explores the duo's criminal past, written by Ian Edginton and illustrated by Chris Mitten, with cover art by Ben Templesmith.

== See also ==
- List of Square Enix video game franchises
