= Kane & Lynch 2: Dog Days =

2010 video game

- Cover art featuring Kane (right) and Lynch (left)
- Developer: IO Interactive (Note: Ported to Microsoft Windows by Nixxes Software)
- Publisher: Square Enix
- Directors: Karsten Lund; Kim Krogh
- Artists: Rasmus Poulsen; Anders Poulsen; Marek Bogdan
- Writer: Oliver Winding
- Composer: Mona Mur
- Engine: Glacier
- Platforms: Microsoft Windows; PlayStation 3; Xbox 360
- Release: NA: August 17, 2010; AU: August 19, 2010; EU: August 20, 2010
- Genre: Third-person shooter
- Modes: Single-player, multiplayer

Kane & Lynch 2: Dog Days is a 2010 third-person shooter video game developed by IO Interactive, published by Square Enix for Microsoft Windows, PlayStation 3 and Xbox 360. It is the sequel to Kane & Lynch: Dead Men.

Additionally, the game can be purchased from the Xbox digital store and played on Xbox One and Xbox Series consoles through the Xbox backwards compatibility program.

The game follows criminals Adam "Kane" Marcus (Brian Bloom) and James Seth Lynch (Jarion Monroe), now the main playable character, who reunite in Shanghai for an arms deal, having agreed to split the money for their retirement. When things go wrong, the two quickly find themselves fighting to survive and escape when they become targets of the entire Shanghai underworld.

Announced in November 2009, the game was described as having a new visual style inspired by documentary films, user-generated content, and the visual quality of camcorder footage, with its in-game camerawork being inspired by hand-held cinematography. The game also employs unprofessional editing and jarring or out-of-place jump-cuts or fast cutting, to make its cutscenes look more unprofessional. The camera sometimes falls, both when the player dies and during certain cutscenes. The game also intentionally censors some of its violence and nudity through pixelization.

Dog Days uses its music and visual aesthetics to reflect upon the violence depicted in the game, as well as the psychology of its characters. It uses survival and psychological thriller techniques to inflict the same effects of the characters on its players. The team wanted to create a postmodernist commentary on commonplace violence in video-games, leading to the game's unconventional approach to portraying realistic consequences to realistic violence, leading the team to seek an uncomfortable, tiresome and oppressive atmosphere, with a focus on themes of violence, urban isolation and loneliness. During development, the game suffered from some pushback as a result of the team's experimental approach, which was considered risky, but it was maintained through to release.

The game received a mixed reception from critics, faulting its over-use of shaky cam on its visual style (which caused discomfort and nausea in some critics and players), controls, gunplay, excessive violence, glitches, short length and level design, but praise for its voice-acting, music, intensity, general visual aesthetics and graphics, and with some critics praising its unconventional approaches to the genre.

A single-player and multiplayer demo was released for the PlayStation Network on July 21, 2010 and for the Xbox Live Marketplace on July 26, 2010. A demo was released for Steam on July 27, 2010.

== Gameplay ==
A screenshot of Kane & Lynch 2: Dog Days. Lynch engages officers with the People's Police in Shanghai.

Players in the campaign mode take control of Lynch, who is backed up by Kane (except in the last mission, where the player takes control of Kane). The online enabled cooperative mode allows one player to take control of Kane. Players can carry two of any weapon they can grab from dead enemies, but unlike the previous game, cannot swap weapons between allies. Players can take cover through a button press. While still having regenerating health, players can also get knocked down, though are able to immediately get back up. During single player missions, allies are invulnerable and cannot be given commands, making it unnecessary to look out for them. Unlike Dead Men, the PC version does not support split-screen co-op.

=== Multiplayer ===
Fragile Alliance returns along with two new variant modes (Undercover Cop and Cops & Robbers). The returning mode still has a group of players attempting to grab as much money as possible while escaping police forces and possible traitors. Undercover Cop follows the same fashion while a randomly chosen player must prevent the team from escaping. Cops & Robbers has a group of player controlled police officers going against the criminals still planned to grab money and escape.

The end of each match will allow players to buy new weapons from their heist money.

There is also a single player variant called Arcade where players must accumulate as much money as possible for high scores while surviving increasingly difficult rounds.

== Synopsis ==
=== Setting and characters ===
Dog Days takes place four years after the end of the first game, where the pair have parted ways. Lynch has started a new life in Shanghai with a girlfriend named Xiu, working for a crime organization led by English-born expat Glazer. When Glazer tells Lynch about a plan to smuggle guns to Africa, Lynch contacts Kane for aid in return for a split in the deal. The money would not only help them retire but also benefit Kane's estranged daughter Jenny (who survived the events in Dead Men).

=== Plot ===
The game is presented from the point of view of an unnamed cameramen, who follows Kane and Lynch throughout the story. After Kane arrives in Shanghai, Lynch brings him along to help on an errand: threatening an informant named Li "Brady" Lung. The plan goes badly and a chase through gang territory ensues. After shooting a number of gang members, the pair corner Brady and his girlfriend in a wet market. A quick firefight ensues, and Brady's girlfriend is accidentally killed in the crossfire. Brady calmly commits suicide, much to the pair's shock.

The next day Kane and Lynch talk to Glazer about the smuggling operation, but their limousine is ambushed by Brady's gang. After a firefight on the highway and through the streets, they learn the leader of their attackers is a crime lord named Hsing. Kane, Lynch and Glazer's mercenaries raid Hsing's sweatshop headquarters and capture him. During an interrogation, Hsing reveals the girl that died with Brady was the daughter of an exceptionally high-ranking Politburo official called Shangsi, and that anyone friendly with the two men is effectively open season. Upon hearing this, Glazer's men turn on Kane and Lynch, who are forced to kill their former associates in order to hide the truth from Glazer. They then escape the police and Hsing's gang.

Lying low in a restaurant, Lynch tries to call Xiu and tell her to meet him so they can flee Shanghai, but she doesn't pick up. Suddenly a Chinese SWAT team arrives. Kane and Lynch kill the policemen, then race to Xiu's apartment, believing she must also be a target. Discovering her apartment complex has been taken over by Hsing's men, the pair fight through the building, and find Xiu being held at gunpoint by Hsing. Kane suggests they kill Hsing immediately, but fearing for Xiu's safety, Lynch knocks Kane unconscious and surrenders.

Kane, Lynch, and Xiu are brutally tortured by Hsing. Believed dead, Lynch is dumped in an alleyway. When he regains consciousness, he kills Hsing and saves Kane, but is too late to save Xiu, who has been raped and skinned alive. Naked and badly lacerated with box cutters, Kane and Lynch manage to escape into the city, fighting their way through another SWAT team in the process.

After finding clothes, the pair arrive at Glazer's arms deal in a shipbuilding complex, hoping Glazer hasn't heard about their problems. Glazer knows the truth about Shangsi's daughter's death, however, and orders his men to kill them, but Kane and Lynch manage to annihilate the gang and corner Glazer, who begs for mercy and reveals that he has a plane that can be used to leave Shanghai. He is then killed by a military sniper, who they realize was sent by Shangsi, who has used Glazer to entrap the pair. After fighting through many PLAGF soldiers and policemen, Kane and Lynch board a freight train leaving the area. However, the train is stopped and they are captured by the military.

While being transported by helicopter to meet Shangsi, Kane and Lynch hijack the vehicle, use the onboard weapons to gun down other helicopters, and force the pilot to land on Shangsi's skyscraper. They slaughter the security personnel and destroy much of the building before confronting Shangsi in his office. Impressed by their skills, Shangsi offers them a pardon in exchange for serving as his employees. In revenge for Xiu's death, and fearing betrayal, Lynch kills Shangsi out of hand. Kane is distraught, realising they now have no chance of redemption or mercy in China.

Some time later, Kane and Lynch sneak into the Shanghai International Airport in order to fly Glazer's private jet out of the country. However, the authorities are alerted and after shooting their way through several areas of the airport they find the jet partially dismantled in a hangar. With no other choice and chased by police, the two are forced to flee on to the runway and hijack a commercial airliner heading for Balzar, Ecuador. The game ends with the plane taking off, before the cameraman, who was left on the ground, is shot by the police, dropping the camera as the game ends.

== Development ==
The team wanted the game to stand out by doing something outrageous and unpleasant, and as a result, took an unconventional and experimental approach. During the game's development, the game was considered risky, although the majority of the team, including art director Rasmus Poulsen, who called it an 'anti-game', continued to seek an "uncomfortable and tiresome", and "oppressive" atmosphere, insisting on its direction. Rasmus infused it with a general theme of loneliness and ordinary day-to-day life, describing it as "sad poetry" and "vague poetry of urban loneliness". The themes the team most wanted to communicate were those of violence, urban alienation, and loneliness. Discussions about going back to a safer, less experimental approach were never made. The game was considered a postmodernist game that meant to comment and criticize violence in video-games by portraying realistic consequences and realistic depictions to acts of violence.

To prepare for the game's art direction, Rasmus traveled to Shanghai with a hand-held low-quality camera, alongside some of his colleagues, Balázs Kiss and Anders Poulsen to take reference imagery during the game's pre-production, as well as artwork, sketches and mockups for the game's cover. During an interview, Rasmus Poulsen speaks of the issues encountered during the approach taken, saying, "[...]It's always difficult when you want to make a product that is a half-art, half-commercial entity. But it had to be non-pleasing. How non-pleasing? That's the question.[...]"

A pair of teaser videos accompanying the announcement present computer-generated animation from a distorted surveillance camera perspective. Following this, an additional batch of videos with the same style were made. Other marketing materials ranged from gameplay showcases to other computer-generated trailers that focused on the game's visual aesthetics.

Soon after its release, three packs of downloadable content (DLC) were made available to download on all platforms. This included a weapons pack, multiplayer mask pack and 3 new multiplayer maps. As a preorder bonus, one of the three DLC packs was given free of charge depending on which retailer it was purchased from. These items are only available in either Multiplayer or Arcade game modes.

=== Audio ===
The game features an experimental and industrial dark ambient musical score, described by its composer and sound designer, Mona Mur, and art director Rasmus Poulsen, as "industrial-horror", and mixes it with diegetic C-pop music, made originally for the game, although only plays on its environments and levels, and the main menu. Game director Karsten Lund instructed Mur to approach the music in this method so that players would identify it as a game with a strong mood and oppressive atmosphere rather than a game with music, and partly so that the music could create an atmosphere of discomfort. Mona Mur also noted influences from films like Blade Runner, Eraserhead, Ghost in the Shell, the works of Kenji Kawai and the video-game Manhunt.

The Kane & Lynch 2: Dog Days soundtrack was originally released 8 February 2011 by Punchdrive; the album was then cancelled due to rights problems. It was re-released 9 March 2011 on a new label, Mad Villa. Mur was hired to create complex ambient soundscape layers generated from real city noises, vintage synthesizers, guitar amplifiers and unusual software. " EMI Music Publishing Scandinavia, Dynamedion created 23 authentic-sounding Asian tracks for the game and recorded vocal talent singing in Mandarin backed up by a number of musicians performing Chinese instruments including percussion, shakuhachi, fue, violin, and pipa.

== Reception ==
Reception

Aggregate score
Aggregator	Score		
Aggregator	PC	PS3	Xbox 360
Metacritic	66/100	62/100	63/100

Review scores
Publication	Score		
Publication	PC	PS3	Xbox 360
Destructoid	N/A	N/A	1/10
Edge	N/A	6/10	6/10
Eurogamer	N/A	N/A	4/10
Game Informer	N/A	6/10	6/10
GameRevolution	C	C	C
GameSpot	6.5/10	6.5/10	6.5/10
GameTrailers	N/A	N/A	8.1/10
GameZone	6/10	6/10	6/10
Giant Bomb	N/A	3/5	2/5
IGN	7/10	7/10	7/10
Joystiq	N/A	N/A	2.5/5
Official Xbox Magazine (US)	N/A	N/A	8/10
PC Gamer (UK)	70%	N/A	N/A
PlayStation: The Official Magazine	N/A	2.5/5	N/A
The Daily Telegraph	N/A	N/A	5/10
The Escapist	3/5	N/A	N/A

Kane & Lynch 2: Dog Days received "mixed or average" reviews on all platforms according to video game review aggregator platform Metacritic. Nevertheless, it generally scored slightly higher than its predecessor.

In Japan, where the PlayStation 3 and Xbox 360 versions were ported for release on August 26, 2010, Famitsu gave it a score of two nines and two sevens, for a total of 32 out of 40. The A.V. Club gave the Xbox 360 version a B−, saying that it "practically runs on rails, and at times takes on the rhythms of an old-school duck-and-cover coin-op like Time Crisis". 411Mania gave the game a score of six out of ten, calling it "a game that you should rent first before buying. Some will love that it's a lot like a movie and features lots of shootouts; some will hate it for the same reason. Fortunately, if you try it before you buy it, you'll know almost immediately whether or not this is going to be the game for you". The Escapist gave the PC version three stars out of five, calling it "a decent game, with some fun cover mechanics and tactical complexity, but the visual realism kind of shoots itself in the foot with unrealistic situations and tedious level design". However, The Daily Telegraph gave the Xbox 360 version a score of five out of ten, saying, "as much fun as there is to be had in the multiplayer, it doesn't include any new developments or references to the game's main plot and suffers from the absence of its title characters. The fact that the campaign only takes around five hours to complete further fuels the sense Dog Days is an incomplete and flawed package". Tae K. Kim of GamePro similarly gave the same console version two-and-a-half stars out of five, saying, "I felt like I could have developed some sort of emotional connection with Kane and Lynch if only they had been presented in the right light, but ultimately, the only thing I felt at the end of my time with the game was a vague sense of relief that I didn't have to spend any more time in their company".

The game has since garnered a small cult following owing largely to its subversive visual style.

The producers were sued at a court in Beijing for "vilifying" the "Chinese people" in 2012. IO Interactive released a statement saying that the game is not meant to insult China.

=== Sales ===
In its debut week, Kane & Lynch 2 went to number one in the UK all-format chart. In its second week, the game dropped to number two on the UK all-format chart despite sales increasing by a third. After less than one month on sale the game dropped out of the Top 10 of the UK all-format charts.

Kane & Lynch 2: Dog Days has sold over 1 million copies worldwide.

== Future ==
IO Interactive lost the rights to Kane & Lynch when they separated from publisher Square Enix in 2017.
