= List of Square Enix Europe games =

Video games by publishing wing

Square Enix's logo

Some video games of Square Enix, a Japanese entertainment company, are associated with its British publishing arm, Square Enix Limited (formerly organised under Square Enix Europe). Square Enix acquired Eidos plc, the parent company of British publisher Eidos Interactive, on 22 April 2009, which was then merged with Square Enix's European publishing wing and reorganized as Square Enix Europe. Prior to its purchase, Eidos plc (formerly SCi Entertainment) was the holding company for the Eidos group of companies, including publisher Eidos Interactive and development studios such as Crystal Dynamics, IO Interactive, Beautiful Game Studios, and Eidos-Montréal. After their purchase, those development studios continued to publish franchises through Square Enix Europe that were previously published by Eidos, such as Tomb Raider, Hitman, Deus Ex, and Championship Manager.

Square Enix announced a major restructuring in March 2013 with Square Enix Europe CEO Phil Rogers became CEO of "Americas and Europe", while Square Enix America CEO Mike Fischer left the company. In 2014, Square Enix founded indie game division Square Enix Collective of Square Enix Limited. Its development studio IO Interactive was sold to management in 2017. The former Square Enix London Studios division, which handles publishing of games from third-party developers, was named Square Enix External Studios in 2018. In 2022, Square Enix sold several development studios and IPs previously published through Square Enix Limited, including Crystal Dynamics, Eidos-Montréal, and Square Enix Montréal, to Embracer Group. It retained the rights to the Outriders, Life Is Strange, and Just Cause franchises, developed in collaboration with third party studios. Since 2023, some games previously published by Eidos, such as Gex and Fear Effect, have been re-published for contemporary platforms by Limited Run Games.

Of the franchises published through Square Enix Limited or its subdivisions, the Championship Manager series has seen the greatest number of releases, at nine games, followed by Life is Strange with seven releases and the Tomb Raider series at six games. Several of these franchises have sold millions of copies both before and after its founding: the Tomb Raider franchise has the highest lifetime sales with over 88 million copies since 1996, followed by Hitman with over 15 million copies sold since 2000. Several other series, including Deus Ex, Championship Manager, and Just Cause, have also sold several million copies over their lifetimes.

== Video games ==
This list includes retail, downloadable, and mobile games primarily produced by Square Enix Limited's part of the group since its formation in April 2009. (Note: Games published after 22 April 2009 where the publisher is listed as Square Enix, Ltd. or Eidos. The merge of Eidos was completed on 10 November 2009.)

List of games
Title	System	Release date	Developer(s)	Division or brand	Ref(s).
Battlestations: Pacific	Xbox 360	12 May 2009	Eidos Hungary	As Eidos	
Battlestations: Pacific	Microsoft Windows	12 May 2009	Eidos Hungary	As Eidos	
Battlestations: Pacific	OS X	12 May 2009	Eidos Hungary / Robosoft Technologies	As Eidos	
Batman: Arkham Asylum	PlayStation 3	25 August 2009	Rocksteady Studios	As Eidos	
Batman: Arkham Asylum	Xbox 360	25 August 2009	Rocksteady Studios	As Eidos	
Batman: Arkham Asylum	Microsoft Windows	15 September 2009	Rocksteady Studios	As Eidos	
Mini Ninjas	Microsoft Windows	8 September 2009	IO Interactive	As Eidos	
Mini Ninjas	PlayStation 3	8 September 2009	IO Interactive	As Eidos	
Mini Ninjas	Wii	8 September 2009	IO Interactive	As Eidos	
Mini Ninjas	Xbox 360	8 September 2009	IO Interactive	As Eidos	
Mini Ninjas	Nintendo DS	8 September 2009	IO Interactive / Magic Pockets	As Eidos	
Mini Ninjas	OS X	8 July 2010	IO Interactive	As Eidos	
Mini Ninjas	Android	4 March 2013	Magic Pockets		
Mini Ninjas	iOS	4 March 2013	Magic Pockets		
Championship Manager 2010	Microsoft Windows	11 September 2009	Beautiful Game Studios	As Eidos	
Championship Manager 2010	OS X	13 November 2009	Beautiful Game Studios / Virtual Programming		
Pony Friends 2	Microsoft Windows	20 November 2009	Tantalus Media	As Eidos in PAL territories	
Pony Friends 2	Nintendo DS	23 February 2010	Tantalus Media		
Pony Friends 2	Wii	23 February 2010	Tantalus Media		
Flora's Fruit Farm	Microsoft Windows	2 October 2009	Honeyslug		
Supreme Commander 2	Microsoft Windows	2 March 2010	Gas Powered Games	SE London Studios	
Supreme Commander 2	Xbox 360	2 March 2010	Gas Powered Games	SE London Studios	
Championship Manager: 80s Legends	Android	18 March 2010	Dynamo Games		
Championship Manager: 80s Legends	iOS	18 March 2010	Dynamo Games		
Just Cause 2	Microsoft Windows	23 March 2010	Avalanche Studios	SE London Studios	
Just Cause 2	PlayStation 3	23 March 2010	Avalanche Studios	SE London Studios	
Just Cause 2	Xbox 360	23 March 2010	Avalanche Studios	SE London Studios	
Kane & Lynch 2: Dog Days	Microsoft Windows	17 August 2010	IO Interactive		
Kane & Lynch 2: Dog Days	PlayStation 3	17 August 2010	IO Interactive		
Kane & Lynch 2: Dog Days	Xbox 360	17 August 2010	IO Interactive		
Lara Croft and the Guardian of Light	Xbox 360	18 August 2010	Crystal Dynamics		
Lara Croft and the Guardian of Light	Microsoft Windows	28 September 2010	Crystal Dynamics		
Lara Croft and the Guardian of Light	PlayStation 3	28 September 2010	Crystal Dynamics		
Lara Croft and the Guardian of Light	iOS	16 December 2010	Crystal Dynamics / Ideaworks Game Studio		
Lara Croft and the Guardian of Light	BlackBerry PlayBook	30 April 2012	Crystal Dynamics		
Lara Croft and the Guardian of Light	Android	16 July 2012	Crystal Dynamics / Ideaworks Game Studio		
Championship Manager 2011	iOS	21 October 2010	Beautiful Game Studios		
Championship Manager 2011	Android	21 October 2010	Beautiful Game Studios		
Championship Manager: 70s Legends	Android	20 December 2010	Dynamo Games		
Championship Manager: 70s Legends	iOS	20 December 2010	Dynamo Games		
Big Hit Baseball	iOS	16 February 2011	Beautiful Game Studios		
Big Hit Cricket	iOS	11 March 2011	Beautiful Game Studios		
Deus Ex: Human Revolution	Microsoft Windows	23 August 2011	Eidos-Montréal		
Deus Ex: Human Revolution	PlayStation 3	23 August 2011	Eidos-Montréal		
Deus Ex: Human Revolution	Xbox 360	23 August 2011	Eidos-Montréal		
Deus Ex: Human Revolution	OS X	26 April 2012	Eidos-Montréal / Feral Interactive		
Deus Ex: Human Revolution	Wii U	22 October 2013	Eidos-Montréal		
All Zombies Must Die!	PlayStation 3	27 December 2011	Doublesix		
All Zombies Must Die!	Xbox 360	28 December 2011	Doublesix		
Heroes of Ruin	Nintendo 3DS	15 June 2012	n-Space		
Mini Ninjas Adventures	Xbox 360	27 June 2012	Side-Kick		
Mensa Academy	PlayStation 3	27 July 2012	Silverball Studios		
Mensa Academy	Wii	27 July 2012	Silverball Studios		
Mensa Academy	Xbox 360	27 July 2012	Silverball Studios		
Mensa Academy	Android	27 July 2012	Silverball Studios		
Mensa Academy	iOS	27 July 2012	Silverball Studios		
Sleeping Dogs	Microsoft Windows	14 August 2012	United Front Games	SE London Studios	
Sleeping Dogs	PlayStation 3	14 August 2012	United Front Games	SE London Studios	
Sleeping Dogs	Xbox 360	14 August 2012	United Front Games	SE London Studios	
Sleeping Dogs	PlayStation 4	14 October 2014	United Front Games	SE London Studios	
Sleeping Dogs	Xbox One	14 October 2014	United Front Games	SE London Studios	
Sleeping Dogs	OS X	31 March 2016	United Front Games / Feral Interactive	SE London Studios	
Hitman: Absolution	Microsoft Windows	20 November 2012	IO Interactive		
Hitman: Absolution	PlayStation 3	20 November 2012	IO Interactive		
Hitman: Absolution	Xbox 360	20 November 2012	IO Interactive		
Hitman: Absolution	OS X	15 May 2014	IO Interactive / Feral Interactive		
Tomb Raider	Microsoft Windows	5 March 2013	Crystal Dynamics		
Tomb Raider	PlayStation 3	5 March 2013	Crystal Dynamics		
Tomb Raider	Xbox 360	5 March 2013	Crystal Dynamics		
Tomb Raider	OS X	23 January 2014	Crystal Dynamics / Feral Interactive		
Tomb Raider	PlayStation 4	28 January 2014	Crystal Dynamics		
Tomb Raider	Xbox One	28 January 2014	Crystal Dynamics		
Tomb Raider	Linux	27 April 2016	Crystal Dynamics / Feral Interactive		
Mini Ninjas Mobile	iOS	6 March 2013	IO Interactive		
Mini Ninjas Mobile	Android	11 March 2013	IO Interactive		
Deus Ex: The Fall	iOS	11 July 2013	N-Fusion Interactive		
Deus Ex: The Fall	Android	21 January 2014	N-Fusion Interactive		
Deus Ex: The Fall	Microsoft Windows	18 March 2014	N-Fusion Interactive		
Champ Man 14	Android	15 October 2013	Distinctive Developments		
Champ Man 14	iOS	15 October 2013	Distinctive Developments		
Tomb Raider	iOS	17 December 2013	Crystal Dynamics		
Thief	Microsoft Windows	25 February 2014	Eidos-Montréal		
Thief	PlayStation 3	25 February 2014	Eidos-Montréal		
Thief	PlayStation 4	25 February 2014	Eidos-Montréal		
Thief	Xbox 360	25 February 2014	Eidos-Montréal		
Thief	Xbox One	25 February 2014	Eidos-Montréal		
Thief	OS X	24 November 2015	Eidos-Montréal / Feral Interactive		
Hitman Go	iOS	17 April 2014	Square Enix Montréal		
Hitman Go	Android	4 June 2014	Square Enix Montréal		
Hitman Go	Microsoft Windows	4 June 2014	Square Enix Montréal		
Hitman Go	Windows Phone	4 June 2014	Square Enix Montréal		
Hitman Go	Linux	23 February 2016	Square Enix Montréal		
Hitman Go	PlayStation 4	23 February 2016	Square Enix Montréal		
Hitman Go	PlayStation Vita	23 February 2016	Square Enix Montréal		
Champ Man 15	iOS	18 August 2014	Distinctive Developments		
Champ Man 15	Android	8 October 2014	Distinctive Developments		
Tomb Raider II	GREE	4 December 2014	GREE		
Lara Croft and the Temple of Osiris	Microsoft Windows	9 December 2014	Crystal Dynamics		
Lara Croft and the Temple of Osiris	PlayStation 4	9 December 2014	Crystal Dynamics		
Lara Croft and the Temple of Osiris	Xbox One	9 December 2014	Crystal Dynamics		
Life Is Strange	Microsoft Windows	30 January 2015	Dontnod Entertainment	SE London Studios	
Life Is Strange	PlayStation 3	30 January 2015	Dontnod Entertainment	SE London Studios	
Life Is Strange	PlayStation 4	30 January 2015	Dontnod Entertainment	SE London Studios	
Life Is Strange	Xbox 360	30 January 2015	Dontnod Entertainment	SE London Studios	
Life Is Strange	Xbox One	30 January 2015	Dontnod Entertainment	SE London Studios	
Lara Croft: Relic Run	Android	28 May 2015	Crystal Dynamics / Simutronics		
Lara Croft: Relic Run	iOS	28 May 2015	Crystal Dynamics / Simutronics		
Lara Croft: Relic Run	Windows Phone	28 May 2015	Crystal Dynamics / Simutronics		
Hitman: Sniper	Android	4 June 2015	Square Enix Montréal		
Hitman: Sniper	iOS	4 June 2015	Square Enix Montréal		
Championship Manager: All Stars	Android	20 August 2015	Distinctive Developments		
Championship Manager: All Stars	iOS	20 August 2015	Distinctive Developments		
Lara Croft Go	Android	27 August 2015	Square Enix Montréal		
Lara Croft Go	iOS	27 August 2015	Square Enix Montréal		
Lara Croft Go	Microsoft Windows	27 August 2015	Square Enix Montréal		
Lara Croft Go	Windows Phone	27 August 2015	Square Enix Montréal		
Champ Man 16	Android	24 September 2015	Beautiful Game Studios		
Champ Man 16	iOS	24 September 2015	Beautiful Game Studios		
Rise of the Tomb Raider	Xbox 360	10 November 2015	Crystal Dynamics		
Rise of the Tomb Raider	Xbox One	10 November 2015	Crystal Dynamics		
Rise of the Tomb Raider	Microsoft Windows	28 January 2016	Crystal Dynamics		
Rise of the Tomb Raider	PlayStation 4	11 October 2016	Crystal Dynamics		
Just Cause 3	Microsoft Windows	1 December 2015	Avalanche Studios	SE London Studios	
Just Cause 3	PlayStation 4	1 December 2015	Avalanche Studios	SE London Studios	
Just Cause 3	Xbox One	1 December 2015	Avalanche Studios	SE London Studios	
Hitman	Microsoft Windows	11 March 2016	IO Interactive		
Hitman	PlayStation 4	11 March 2016	IO Interactive		
Hitman	Xbox One	11 March 2016	IO Interactive		
Championship Manager 17	Android	14 August 2016	Distinctive Developments		
Championship Manager 17	iOS	14 August 2016	Distinctive Developments		
Deus Ex Go	Android	18 August 2016	Square Enix Montréal		
Deus Ex Go	iOS	18 August 2016	Square Enix Montréal		
Deus Ex: Mankind Divided	Microsoft Windows	23 August 2016	Eidos-Montréal		
Deus Ex: Mankind Divided	PlayStation 4	23 August 2016	Eidos-Montréal		
Deus Ex: Mankind Divided	Xbox One	23 August 2016	Eidos-Montréal		
The Turing Test	Microsoft Windows	30 August 2016	Bulkhead	SE Collective	
The Turing Test	Xbox One	30 August 2016	Bulkhead	SE Collective	
The Turing Test	PlayStation 4	23 January 2017	Bulkhead	SE Collective	
The Turing Test	Nintendo Switch	7 February 2020	Bulkhead	SE Collective	
Life Is Strange: Before the Storm	Microsoft Windows	31 August 2017	Deck Nine Games	SE London Studios	
Life Is Strange: Before the Storm	PlayStation 4	31 August 2017	Deck Nine Games	SE London Studios	
Life Is Strange: Before the Storm	Xbox One	31 August 2017	Deck Nine Games	SE London Studios	
The Awesome Adventures of Captain Spirit	Microsoft Windows	26 June 2018	Dontnod Entertainment	SE External Studios	
The Awesome Adventures of Captain Spirit	PlayStation 4	26 June 2018	Dontnod Entertainment	SE External Studios	
The Awesome Adventures of Captain Spirit	Xbox One	26 June 2018	Dontnod Entertainment	SE External Studios	
Shadow of the Tomb Raider	Microsoft Windows	14 September 2018	Eidos-Montréal		
Shadow of the Tomb Raider	PlayStation 4	14 September 2018	Eidos-Montréal		
Shadow of the Tomb Raider	Xbox One	14 September 2018	Eidos-Montréal		
Shadow of the Tomb Raider	Linux	5 November 2019	Eidos-Montréal		
Shadow of the Tomb Raider	Stadia	19 November 2019	Eidos-Montréal		
Life Is Strange 2	Microsoft Windows	27 September 2018	Dontnod Entertainment	SE External Studios	
Life Is Strange 2	PlayStation 4	27 September 2018	Dontnod Entertainment	SE External Studios	
Life Is Strange 2	Xbox One	27 September 2018	Dontnod Entertainment	SE External Studios	
Just Cause 4	Microsoft Windows	4 December 2018	Avalanche Studios	SE External Studios	
Just Cause 4	PlayStation 4	4 December 2018	Avalanche Studios	SE External Studios	
Just Cause 4	Xbox One	4 December 2018	Avalanche Studios	SE External Studios	
Battalion 1944	Microsoft Windows	23 May 2019	Bulkhead	SE Collective	
Marvel's Avengers	Microsoft Windows	4 September 2020	Crystal Dynamics		
Marvel's Avengers	PlayStation 4	4 September 2020	Crystal Dynamics		
Marvel's Avengers	Xbox One	4 September 2020	Crystal Dynamics		
Marvel's Avengers	Stadia	4 September 2020	Crystal Dynamics		
Outriders	Microsoft Windows	1 April 2021	People Can Fly	SE External Studios	
Outriders	PlayStation 4	1 April 2021	People Can Fly	SE External Studios	
Outriders	PlayStation 5	1 April 2021	People Can Fly	SE External Studios	
Outriders	Xbox One	1 April 2021	People Can Fly	SE External Studios	
Outriders	Xbox Series X/S	1 April 2021	People Can Fly	SE External Studios	
Life Is Strange: True Colors	Microsoft Windows	10 September 2021	Deck Nine Games	SE External Studios	
Life Is Strange: True Colors	PlayStation 4	10 September 2021	Deck Nine Games	SE External Studios	
Life Is Strange: True Colors	PlayStation 5	10 September 2021	Deck Nine Games	SE External Studios	
Life Is Strange: True Colors	Xbox One	10 September 2021	Deck Nine Games	SE External Studios	
Life Is Strange: True Colors	Xbox Series X/S	10 September 2021	Deck Nine Games	SE External Studios	
Life Is Strange: True Colors	Stadia	10 September 2021	Deck Nine Games	SE External Studios	
Life Is Strange: True Colors	Nintendo Switch	7 December 2021	Deck Nine Games	SE External Studios	
Circuit Superstars	Microsoft Windows	12 October 2021	Original Fire Games	SE Collective	
Circuit Superstars	Xbox One	12 October 2021	Original Fire Games	SE Collective	
Circuit Superstars	PlayStation 4	28 January 2022	Original Fire Games	SE Collective	
Circuit Superstars	Nintendo Switch	21 June 2023	Original Fire Games	SE Collective	
Marvel's Guardians of the Galaxy	Microsoft Windows	26 October 2021	Eidos-Montréal		
Marvel's Guardians of the Galaxy	Nintendo Switch	26 October 2021	Eidos-Montréal		
Marvel's Guardians of the Galaxy	PlayStation 4	26 October 2021	Eidos-Montréal		
Marvel's Guardians of the Galaxy	PlayStation 5	26 October 2021	Eidos-Montréal		
Marvel's Guardians of the Galaxy	Xbox One	26 October 2021	Eidos-Montréal		
Marvel's Guardians of the Galaxy	Xbox Series X/S	26 October 2021	Eidos-Montréal		
Life Is Strange Remastered Collection	Microsoft Windows	1 February 2022	Deck Nine Games	SE External Studios	
Life Is Strange Remastered Collection	PlayStation 4	1 February 2022	Deck Nine Games	SE External Studios	
Life Is Strange Remastered Collection	Xbox One	1 February 2022	Deck Nine Games	SE External Studios	
Life Is Strange Remastered Collection	Stadia	1 February 2022	Deck Nine Games	SE External Studios	
Life Is Strange Remastered Collection	Nintendo Switch	27 September 2022	Deck Nine Games	SE External Studios	
Hitman Sniper: The Shadows	Android	3 March 2022	Square Enix Montréal		
Hitman Sniper: The Shadows	iOS	3 March 2022	Square Enix Montréal		
Arena Battle Champions	Android	12 April 2022	Square Enix Montréal		
Arena Battle Champions	iOS	21 July 2022	Square Enix Montréal		
PowerWash Simulator	Microsoft Windows	14 July 2022	FuturLab	SE Collective	
PowerWash Simulator	Xbox One	14 July 2022	FuturLab	SE Collective	
PowerWash Simulator	Xbox Series X/S	14 July 2022	FuturLab	SE Collective	
PowerWash Simulator	Nintendo Switch	31 January 2023	FuturLab	SE Collective	
PowerWash Simulator	PlayStation 4	31 January 2023	FuturLab	SE Collective	
PowerWash Simulator	PlayStation 5	31 January 2023	FuturLab	SE Collective	
PowerWash Simulator	Meta Quest 2	2 November 2023	FuturLab	SE Collective	
PowerWash Simulator	Meta Quest Pro	2 November 2023	FuturLab	SE Collective	
PowerWash Simulator	Meta Quest 3	2 November 2023	FuturLab	SE Collective	
PowerWash Simulator	macOS	3 December 2025	FuturLab	SE Collective	
PowerWash Simulator	iOS	3 December 2025	FuturLab	SE Collective	
Little Goody Two Shoes	Microsoft Windows	31 October 2023	AstralShift	SE Collective	
Little Goody Two Shoes	PlayStation 5	31 October 2023	AstralShift	SE Collective	
Little Goody Two Shoes	Xbox Series X/S	31 October 2023	AstralShift	SE Collective	
Little Goody Two Shoes	Nintendo Switch	31 October 2023	AstralShift	SE Collective	
Life Is Strange: Double Exposure	Microsoft Windows	29 October 2024	Deck Nine Games	SE External Studios	
Life Is Strange: Double Exposure	PlayStation 5	29 October 2024	Deck Nine Games	SE External Studios	
Life Is Strange: Double Exposure	Xbox Series X/S	29 October 2024	Deck Nine Games	SE External Studios	
Life Is Strange: Reunion	Microsoft Windows	26 March 2026	Deck Nine Games	SE External Studios	
Life Is Strange: Reunion	PlayStation 5	26 March 2026	Deck Nine Games	SE External Studios	
Life Is Strange: Reunion	Xbox Series X/S	26 March 2026	Deck Nine Games	SE External Studios	
Vaultbreakers	Microsoft Windows	TBA	BetaDwarf	SE Collective	

== Cancelled games ==
Title	Planned system(s)	Cancellation date	Developer(s)	Note	Ref.
Legacy of Kain: Dead Sun	Microsoft Windows, PlayStation 3, Xbox 360	2012	Climax Studios		
Triad Wars	Microsoft Windows	23 December 2015	United Front Games		
Nosgoth	Microsoft Windows	8 April 2016	Psyonix		
Just Cause Mobile	Android, iOS	3 July 2023	Square Enix Montréal		
Project Gemini	—N/a	1 June 2025	People Can Fly	Suspended by People Can Fly following communication breakdown	
