= List of Deus Ex media =

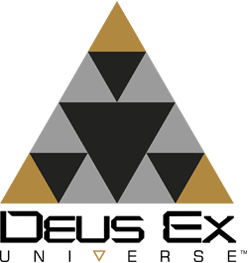
The logo of the Deus Ex franchise

Deus Ex is a cyberpunk franchise created by Ion Storm and owned and published by Eidos Interactive, later Square Enix, and currently Eidos-Montréal.

== Video games ==
=== Main series ===
Game	Release date	Ref.
Deus Ex	June 22, 2000	
Notes: Developed by Ion Storm; Released on Microsoft Windows; Ported to Mac OS on July 27, 2000; Ported to PlayStation 2 on March 25, 2002, as Deus Ex: The Conspiracy
Deus Ex: Invisible War	December 2, 2003	
Notes: Developed by Ion Storm; Released on Microsoft Windows and Xbox
Deus Ex: Human Revolution	August 23, 2011	
Notes: Developed by Eidos-Montréal; Released on Microsoft Windows, PlayStation 3, and Xbox 360; Ported to macOS on April 26, 2012, as Deus Ex: Human Revolution – Ultimate Edition; Deus Ex: Human Revolution – Director's Cut released on October 22, 2013, for Microsoft Windows, PlayStation 3, Wii U, and Xbox 360; Deus Ex: Human Revolution – Director's Cut ported to macOS on April 16, 2014
Deus Ex: Mankind Divided	August 23, 2016	
Notes: Developed by Eidos-Montréal; Released on Microsoft Windows, PlayStation 4, and Xbox One; Ported to Linux on November 3, 2016; Ported to macOS on December 12, 2017

=== Spin-off games ===
Game	Release date	Ref.
Deus Ex: The Fall	July 11, 2013	
Notes: Developed by N-Fusion Interactive; Released on iOS; Ported to Android on January 21, 2014; Ported to Microsoft Windows on March 25, 2014
Deus Ex Go	August 18, 2016	
Notes: Developed by Square Enix Montréal; Released on Android and iOS; Ported to Microsoft Windows and Windows 10 Mobile on March 9, 2017
Deus Ex: Breach	January 24, 2017	
Notes: Developed by Eidos-Montréal; Released on Microsoft Windows; Stand-alone version of game mode contained in Deus Ex: Mankind Divided
Deus Ex: Mankind Divided – VR Experience	January 24, 2017	
Notes: Developed by Eidos-Montréal; Released on Microsoft Windows for VR headsets

== Print media ==
=== Novels ===
Title	Release date	ISBN	Ref.
Deus Ex: Icarus Effect	February 22, 2011	ISBN 978-0345523594	
Notes: By James Swallow
Deus Ex: Fallen Angel	October 22, 2013	N/A	
Notes: Novella; By James Swallow; Included with some editions of Deus Ex: Human Revolution – Director's Cut
Deus Ex: Black Light	August 23, 2016	ISBN 978-1785651205	
Notes: By James Swallow
Deus Ex: Hard Line	August 23, 2016	ISBN 978-1785654831	
Notes: Novella; By James Swallow; Included with some editions of Deus Ex: Mankind Divided

=== Comic books ===
Title	Release date(s)	Ref(s).
Deus Ex: Human Revolution	February 9, 2011 – July 20, 2011	
Notes: Six-issue limited series; Story by Robbie Morrison; Art by Trevor Hairsine
Deus Ex: Children's Crusade	February 10, 2016 – June 29, 2016	
Notes: Five-issue limited series; Story by Alexander C. Irvine; Art by John Aggs; Collection published on August 30, 2016 (ISBN 978-1785851810)
Deus Ex: The Dawning Darkness	August 23, 2016	
Notes: One-shot; Story by Alexander C. Irvine; Art by John Aggs; Included with some editions of Deus Ex: Mankind Divided

=== Art books ===
Title	Release date	ISBN	Ref.
Deus Ex: Human Revolution – Design Work	August 23, 2011	N/A	
Notes: Included with some editions of Deus Ex: Human Revolution
The Art of Deus Ex Universe	August 23, 2016	ISBN 978-1783290987	
Notes: By Paul Davies
Deus Ex: Mankind Divided – Design Work	August 23, 2016	ISBN 978-1785651793	
Notes: Included with some editions of Deus Ex: Mankind Divided
The Art of Deus Ex Universe: Limited Edition	August 26, 2016	ISBN 978-1783294923	
Notes: By Paul Davies

== Soundtracks ==
Title	Release date	Ref.
Deus Ex: Human Revolution Original Soundtrack	November 15, 2011	
Notes: Music by Michael McCann
Deus Ex: Mankind Divided Original Soundtrack	December 2, 2016	
Notes: Music by Michael McCann, Sascha Dikiciyan, and Ed Harrison
Deus Ex: Mankind Divided Original Soundtrack – Extended Edition	December 2, 2016	
Notes: Music by Michael McCann, Sascha Dikiciyan, and Ed Harrison
Deus Ex: Human Revolution Original Soundtrack – Limited Edition	December 16, 2016	
Notes: Music by Michael McCann
Deus Ex: Breach Original Soundtrack	June 2, 2017	
Notes: Music by Ed Harrison
