= Tokyo Dark =

2017 video game

- Developer: Cherrymochi
- Publishers: WW: Square Enix Collective; JP: Unties
- Producer: Maho Williams
- Designer: Jon Williams
- Artist: Laura Jin
- Writers: Jon Williams; Chris Krubeck
- Composer: [Matthew Steed]
- Engine: Construct 2
- Platforms: Microsoft Windows; Nintendo Switch; PlayStation 4
- Release: Microsoft Windows: WW: 7 September 2017; Nintendo Switch: WW: 7 November 2019; PlayStation 4: WW: 10 January 2020
- Genre: Point-and-click adventure
- Mode: Single-player

Tokyo Dark is a point-and-click adventure game developed by the indie developer Cherrymochi and published by Square Enix Collective for Microsoft Windows and macOS. It follows the story of Detective Itō Ayami who searches for her missing partner, Detective Kazuki Tanaka, who disappeared under mysterious circumstances while following a case. The player’s choices directly affect Ayami’s mental state and thought processes which later result in one of the game’s multiple endings.

== Plot ==
The player takes control of Detective Itō Ayami (voiced by Asama Hikage) who is looking for her partner, Detective Kazuki Tanaka, that went missing during an investigation. The story can change significantly depending on the player's actions.

During the exposition, Ayami falls victim to workplace drama, a steady mental decline, and an obsession over the events surrounding her partner's disappearance. She also comes into possession of a mask that, through events that are spoilers for the story, she believes to be critical in her mental and physical journey of finding and bringing back Tanaka at all costs. The end result is determined by the player's choices; an epilogue from Ayami ends the story before credits are presented.

After the credits, two ghosts appear and speak to each other, philosophically debating and reflecting on the choices Ayami—the player—made. It ultimately reveals to the player that all endings in the game are valid and true, but only one of them is canonical. The ghosts then leave after noting that the cycle perpetuates once more.

== Gameplay ==
The game is a point-and-click adventure game. The game's store page on Steam describes the gameplay as "the exploration, discovery and puzzle solving found in Point and Click Adventures married with narrative depth and intrigue of visual novels."

== Development ==
The game was funded via Kickstarter. The goal of the campaign was 40,000 CAD and was surpassed with a total of 225.000 CAD. The game features an original soundtrack by Reign of Fury front man Matt 'Bison' Steed. The animated sequences were produced by Graphinica, while the Japanese novelist Ureshino Kimi was responsible for the Japanese localization.

A port of the game to Nintendo Switch and PlayStation 4 in Japan was announced in August 2018 by Unties. The port will be developed by mebius. The new release, titled Tokyo Dark: Remembrance, includes additional content, new endings, and a full German translation. The Nintendo Switch version was released on November 7, 2019, while the PlayStation 4 version followed on January 10, 2020.

== Reception ==
Reception

Aggregate score
Aggregator	Score
Metacritic	PC: 70/100; NS: 74/100

Review scores
Publication	Score
Adventure Gamers	3.5/5
Destructoid	7/10
VideoGamer.com	6/10

Tokyo Dark received "mixed or average" reviews, according to review aggregator platform Metacritic.

Matthias Glanznig from Adventure Gamers said that "Although falling short of its full potential, Tokyo Dark tells an intriguing mystery story and nicely integrates elements of both western and eastern cultures."

TheBlondeBass of Destructoid said that the game is "Solid and definitely has an audience. There could be some hard-to-ignore faults, but the experience is fun."

Colm Ahern's of VideoGamer.com stated that "Tokyo Dark is an enjoyable supernatural mystery that holds your attention up until the end, which makes the disappointing execution of the SPIN system a real shame."

== Awards and nominations ==
- "Vermillion Gate Award Winner" at BitSummit 4th
- "Magical Presence Award Nominee" at BitSummit 4th
- "Dengeki PlayStation Indies on the Rise Award Nominee" at BitSummit
