= Wardogs =

Upcoming video game

- Developer: Bulkhead
- Publisher: Team17
- Producers: Joe Brammer; Kane Allard
- Designer: Mark Pinney
- Engine: Unreal Engine 5
- Platforms: Windows; PlayStation 5; Xbox Series X/S
- Release: Windows (early access); 10 September 2026; PS5, Xbox Series X/S; 2028
- Genre: First-person shooter
- Mode: Multiplayer

Wardogs (stylised in all caps) is an upcoming first-person shooter video game developed by Bulkhead and published by Team17. It was released into closed beta on 22 August 2026 and into early access for Windows on 10 September 2026, with PlayStation 5 and Xbox Series X and Series S releases scheduled for 2028.

Inspired by the "King of the Hill" custom gamemode mod for Arma 3, Wardogs has players join one of three mercenary factions fighting a multi-sided battle over a randomised control zone in the mountains of the Caucasus region of Eastern Europe. The game revolves around a quasi-virtual economy in which players have in-game cash and must manage their finances to purchase their own equipment and vehicles while accounting for factors such as affordability, risk of equipment loss, and overall profits. Despite revolving around currency, Wardogs does not feature any microtransactions, such as an item shop or a battle pass system.

The development of Wardogs took several years, with it first being pitched to Tencent with a budget of £10 million to £12 million. However, disagreements between Bulkhead and Tencent led to Bulkhead joining Team17. Wardogs was first announced in February 2026. As the game is still in active development, each season features progression wipes and experimental game mechanic alterations as a means of testing features and player behaviors.

Wardogs received positive reception upon its early access release from both playtesters and critics. The game was a financial success in early access, with 2 million copies sold and over 400,000 peak concurrent players within less than a week, accumulating around £52.2 million in revenue. It was nominated for "Best Early Access Game" at the 2026 Golden Joystick Awards, although it came in second place and was beat out by Subnautica 2.

== Gameplay ==
In-game screenshot of a player traversing the land

Wardogs is a player-versus-player tactical shooter in which players, who are often referred to as Wardogs, are affected by realistic factors and can be killed quickly. The game is set in an implied alternate history in the fictional Caucasus region of Kolchia in Eastern Europe. The region is contested by three private military companies (PMCs): Lonestar (blue) from the West, Valkyra (red) from the Soviet People's Republic, and Manticore (green) from the Kingdom of Persia. All three factions fight for a resource called PV-1. Servers of up to 100 players are split into three teams representing these PMCs, who fight for a two-kilometre diameter "Control Zone" placed randomly on one of the three larger 256-square-kilometre maps.

The team with the most players in the Control Zone scores a point every thirty seconds, which can be boosted by holding a much smaller slowly-moving "Hot Zone" within the Control Zone that counts players within it as double. Across the map are towers containing digits of a code that, when completed, can force the Hot Zone to move toward a tower; teams can also build drills, which can draw the Hot Zone toward them while active. As a way to help hold positions in and around the Control Zone, players can build structures with hammers and supplied building materials, with the ability to establish forward operating bases that offer greater structure and emplacement options and can serve as team rallying points, though they must be continuously supplied. Wardogs has similarities to sandbox games, as players can use weapons and vehicles to destroy the environment, such as buildings, around them.

Each player's account in Wardogs starts with $10,000 in in-game cash, which can be used to purchase an assortment of weapons, equipment, ammunition, attachments, vehicles, helicopters, and supplies for themselves and their team. These purchases, except initial unlocks, are not persistent and exist in the match only, but cash is persistent across matches, forcing players to be wise with their purchases, consider the risks of taking expensive equipment and vehicles to the front, and aim for a personal profit by the end of the match (with profits for their current life displayed next to the cash counter on the HUD). Cash is a significant factor in gameplay, with certain tasks and actions such as kills, assists, transporting, supplying allies, and being in the Control Zone or Hot Zone all providing payment, creating financial incentives for playing support roles such as logistics, military engineering, or airlifting instead of prioritising combat. In turn, players must use their cash for a large number of actions, such as buying gear and supplies, repairing their vehicles, or taking items from supply crates ("purchased" from the player that delivered the supply crate, who can also apply a markup to their supplies for greater profit, at risk of potentially making them too expensive and unappealing).

Players can use cash as part of interactions and cooperation, such as offering cash as a "bribe" when incapacitated to encourage being revived, or giving small tips to players for transporting or resurrecting them. They can also bet wagers on certain events and tasks, such as for whether or not they can get a certain amount of kills in one life; this was added in season two. Cash can also serve a role in the game's anticheat system. Cash, XP, and unlocks reset for all players with every season, but cash can be exchanged for gold bars, which are safe from seasonal resets, have a simulated exchange rate, and can be used to purchase cosmetics and emotes. These gold bars are the only way to acquire these items, and the cash exchange is the only way to acquire gold bars. Wardogs does not have microtransactions nor a battle pass.

== Seasons ==
Each season of Wardogs wipes the player's progression and adds new mechanics, weapons, and attachments for the weapons. The season three preview video was delayed as production on Wardogs was slowing down temporarily. On 6 November 2026, a behind-the-scenes video released for season three and revealed that it was coming out on 12 November 2026.

No	Title	Period	Description
1	Season 1 (Note: Season one did not have a formal name and it was mainly referred to as "Season 1")	10 September 2026 – 15 October 2026	The first season of Wardogs was released with early access on 10 September 2026. It brought several bug-fixes and changed a lot of the beta mechanics. It also added a new report tracking system to reporting.
2	WARDOGS Season 02	15 October 2026 – 12 November 2026	Wardogs season two released on 15 October 2026. It added significant amount of new attachments for weapons. It also wiped all player progression from season one, such as levels and in-game cash. Season two added a new "Rain" system that makes it rain the entire match and causes the player's vision to worsen. Season two received backlash from players as they complained that it became "too easy" to unlock new content. Bulkhead responded by saying "we were wrong" about making it too easy. In the start of season two, Lonestar (team blue) got a 5% XP bonus, which also got backlash from the community. Bulkhead added a region locking system to protect players from cheating.
3	WARDOGS Season 03	12 November 2026 – present	Wardogs season 3 released on 12 November 2026 and brought a new map called Sabatulo, which features urban warfare and close quarters combat, and a limited time game mode (LTM).

== Development and release ==
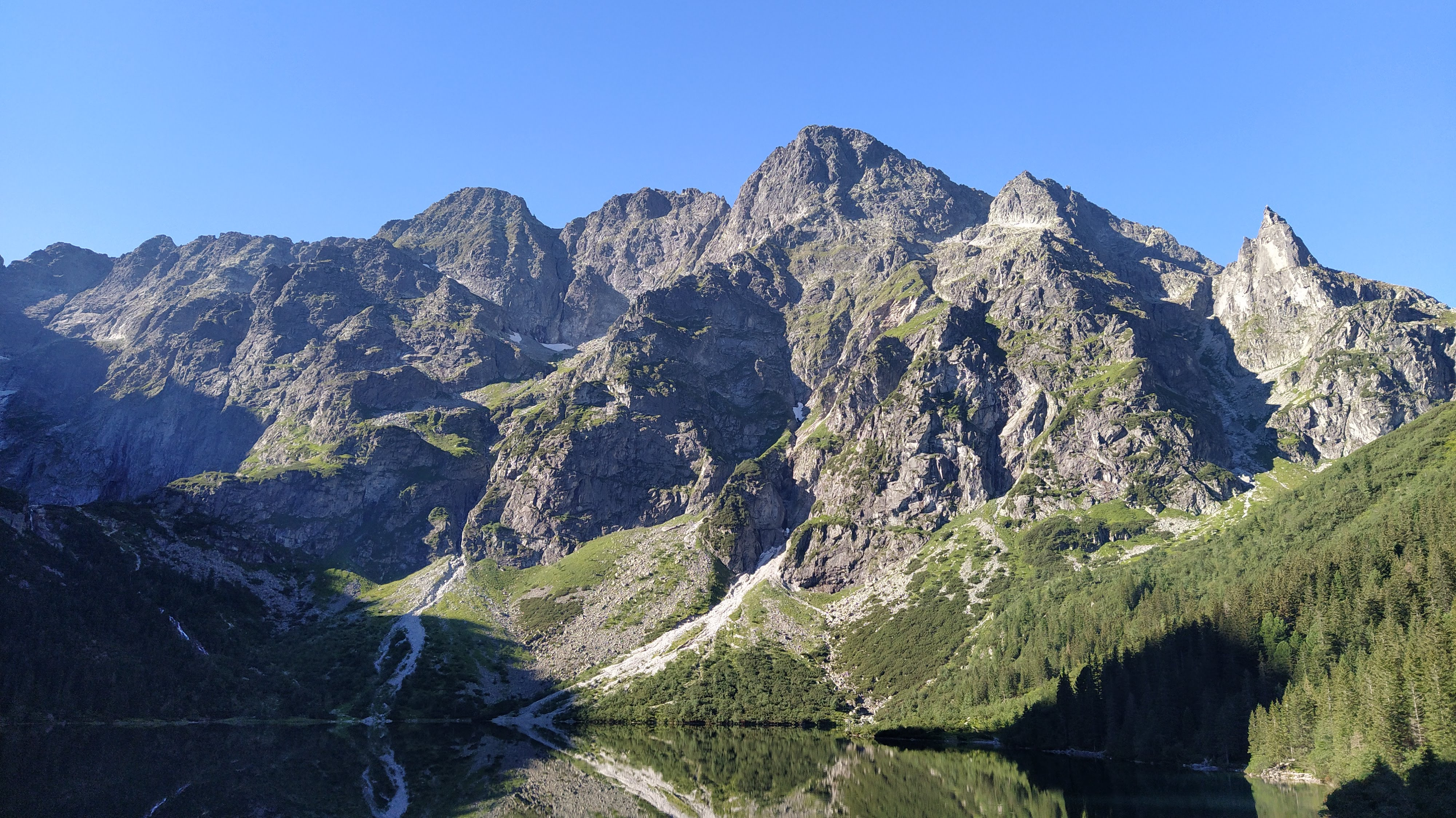
Bulkhead took inspiration from the Caucasus region of Eastern Europe for its environment.

Development of Wardogs took several years and first started in Derby, England, with the engine of choice being Unreal Engine 5. Bulkhead initially pitched the game's concept to the studio's prior owner, Tencent, with a budget of around £10 million and £12 million. However, Tencent insisted on a larger and more expensive production and was confused and suspicious of Bulkhead's development doctrine that discouraged "throwing money at people and problems"; Bulkhead CEO Joe Brammer likewise disdained Tencent's mandated corporate direction, and considered quitting and closing down Bulkhead if another buyer for the studio could not be found.

Bulkhead left Tencent in 2025 and joined a consortium with video game publisher Team17. Wardogs was announced on 5 February 2026 by Team17 with the tagline of "Tactical All Out Warfare". On 6 June 2026, a gameplay trailer was released to Bulkhead's YouTube channel. It was also shown at the Future Games Show Summer Showcase. During development, Bulkhead laid off several workers, affecting QA testing.

Wardogs launched into a closed beta on 22 August 2026 for people who pre-ordered it. A showcase of the full game was livestreamed on Twitch on 3 September 2026. It released into early access on 10 September 2026. Bulkhead plans to keep the game in early access for approximately two years. Bulkhead built a framework they call the "War Dynamics Framework", which they used to create many aspects of the core game, such as vehicle physics and weapon systems. They worked with real-world aerospace and ballistics experts to help build the framework. They were assisted by video game studio Salty Panda Studios UG to help with networking.

According to Eurogamer Bulkhead's focus for early access was gameplay performance, fixing bugs, and balancing out the game as a whole. On 7 September, it was announced that BisectHosting would be a hosting partner to balance server performance standards before launch. Although the game was slated for release on 10 September, it was released on 11 September in certain timezones. As a part of the game's launch, Bulkhead announced that Wardogs will be ported to PlayStation 5 and Xbox Series X and Series S in 2028.

== Reception ==
Reception

Aggregate scores
Aggregator	Score
Metacritic	TBD
OpenCritic	TBD

Review scores
Publication	Score
Game Informer	TBD
IGN	TBD

=== Commercial performance ===
According to Steam statistics, Wardogs reached the top of its charts at number one within hours of the early access launch. The game directly competed with Call of Duty: Modern Warfare 4, which entered early access on the same day. It also had over one million Steam wishlists. Nearly 500,000 players played the closed beta, with over 100,000 concurrent players on Steam at one point. Playtesters provided very positive feedback, with some saying performance and optimisation exceeded expectations.

Wardogs surpassed 300,000 concurrent players on Steam and sold 1 million copies on 10 September, its first day in early access. By 15 September, Wardogs had a peak player count of 428,666 and recorded over 2 million copies sold; on 27 September, sales surpassed 3 million copies. Over £52.2 million in revenue was generated from sales within its first week, putting it at #7 in Steam's 2026 list of new games in terms of revenue. Brammer reported that Bulkhead had been struggling to deal with DDoS attacks since launch and that the developers felt "a bit out of control with how big things have gone and how much extra security we have been forced to do". Despite its large initial playerbase and sales figures, Bulkhead stated that Wardogs is not designed nor intended to have widespread appeal, and encouraged prospective buyers to "look into it more" before purchasing it. Brammer also said he expected the player count to decrease naturally as "hype dies down". In October 2026, Gamesindustry.biz reported that Wardogs topped the charts for Newzoo's September PC revenue charts, surpassing EA Sports FC 27. Wardogs was nominated for "Best Early Access Game" at the 2026 Golden Joystick Awards; it placed second and was beat out by Subnautica 2.

=== Critical reception ===
James Ford, reviewing the early access for Polygon, called Wardogs one of the "best FPS games of the decade". He highlighted its gameplay and social mechanics, noting the development of a dynamically-shifting metagame as players pursued unlock-based strategies and counter-strategies. For instance, he noted hollow-points being used on exposed limbs to circumvent high-tier armor or mortars ending an overreliance on fortified bases. Eurogamer's Rick Lane commended the gameplay and its "kind of ingenious" use of cash as both a positive and a flaw, comparing its influences on player behaviors to a social experiment. Kotaku's Zack Zwiezen agreed with cash having interesting effects compared to other shooter games, and called Wardogs a "damn good FPS".

During its initial launch, Wardogs's servers experienced significant struggles during matchmaking, which Brammer suggested was due to Valve Corporation rate limiting the game. During this period, the game was review bombed when it appeared that streamers could skip login queues while regular players could not; Bulkhead confirmed this was intentional and undid the change. Additional criticism arose regarding claims of the game's progression being too slow in season one and too fast (and exploitable) in season two, benefiting grinders while others struggled to catch up or contend with opponents using high-level gear they lacked time to unlock the counters to.

After the early access release, an internet meme arose regarding the Lonestar team's perceived lack of skill and competency, as well as gameplay disadvantages such as their brighter clothing and unfavorable spawn placements. While the meme encouraged the development of communities based on team identification, genuine criticism arose after it created a self-fulfilling prophecy where skilled players refused to join Lonestar, leaving inexperienced players unaware of the meme to fill it instead. In Season 2, Bulkhead experimented with small bonuses for Lonestar to test whether their disadvantage was fundamental or psychological, only to remove it within one day after players began leaving servers if they could not join Lonestar for the bonuses, causing matches to stall.

== Awards and nominations ==
Year	Ceremony	Award	Result	Ref
2026	Golden Joystick Awards	Best Early Access Game	Nominated	

== See also ==
- List of video games by Team17
