= Lara Croft Go =

2015 video game

- Developer: Square Enix Montreal (Note: Mirror of Spirits developed by KO_OP.)
- Publisher: Square Enix
- Director: Daniel Lutz
- Series: Tomb Raider
- Engine: Unity
- Platforms: iOS, Android, Windows Phone, Microsoft Windows, PlayStation 4, PlayStation Vita, macOS, Apple TV, Linux
- Release: iOS, Android, Windows Phone: WW: 27 August 2015; Microsoft Windows: WW: 27 August 2015; WW: 4 December 2016 (Steam); PlayStation 4, PlayStation Vita: WW: 3 December 2016; macOS, Linux: WW: 4 December 2016
- Genre: Puzzle
- Mode: Single-player

Lara Croft Go is a 2015 puzzle video game developed by Square Enix Montreal and published by Square Enix. A spin-off of the Tomb Raider series. The player moves Lara Croft as a puzzle piece through a board game while avoiding obstacles and manipulating the environment. The developers distilled major series motifs, such as boulder-chases and reaction-based gameplay, to suit Lara Croft Go's time-independent gameplay. The game was developed as a spiritual successor to its 2014 Hitman Go, based on another Square Enix Europe franchise. It was released in August 2015 for Android, iOS, Windows, and Windows Phone devices. Versions for PlayStation 4, PlayStation Vita and Steam were released in December 2016.

The game received generally positive reviews. Critics praised its aesthetics, puzzle design, and fidelity to the series, but criticized its short length and disputed its degree of difficulty. It was selected for a 2016 Apple Design Award, Apple's 2015 iPhone game of the year, and best mobile/handheld game at the 2015 The Game Awards. Like its predecessor, it has been considered as one of the greatest mobile games ever made by many publications and critics.

== Gameplay ==
Lara Croft encountering a group of snakes

Lara Croft Go is a turn-based puzzle video game in the Tomb Raider franchise. Its core gameplay and control scheme is similar to its predecessor, Hitman Go. Levels are composed of interconnected nodes and lines. The player controls the series' protagonist, Lara Croft. The player and the environment take turns, in which one rests while the other moves. During the player's turn, the player moves Croft one unit between connected nodes in the given direction. While Croft rests at the node, enemies and obstacles on the board simultaneously take a turn to move one unit. While levels in Hitman Go were restricted to the horizontal plane, Lara Croft Go adds vertical movement with steps, cliff faces, and climbable terrain incorporated into the level design. The game contains five chapters and forty levels in total.

As the player progresses, the game's puzzles become more complex. Successive levels introduce new game mechanics and enemy types. Enemies take the form of deadly creatures such as snakes, lizards, and giant spiders. Each enemy type has a specific movement pattern. Single-use items, such as spears, can be collected on levels and then used to dispatch enemies from a distance. Other mechanics include obstacles such as boulders, saw blades, and traps to avoid. The player can activate levers, which shift walls and platforms to open paths through the level. Lara Croft Go also features optional in-app purchases, which provide hints to the puzzles.

== Development and release ==
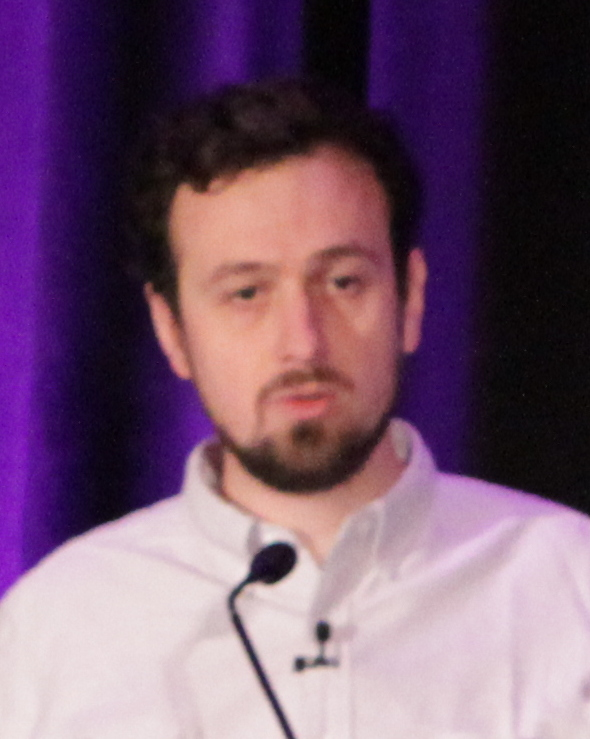
Technical director Antoine Routon presents on the game's development at the 2016 Game Developers Conference.

Lara Croft Go was developed by Square Enix Montréal, a studio that was founded to develop a triple-A Hitman game but was repurposed to create mobile games for the West. All of the staff left besides technical director Antoine Routon and game director Daniel Lutz, and after a month of ideation, Lutz convinced Routon to work on a turn-based Hitman game, which became Hitman Go, and released to what the developers considered a positive response. The quick, turn-based puzzle concept itself came from a focus on short sessions while keeping the bespoke series visual aesthetic, like an "elegant board game", through many rounds of iteration. The team felt that their product distilled the franchise's elements into its simplest form.

Upon seeing the Hitman franchise reduced to its core elements, the development team saw a Lara Croft Tomb Raider version as an obvious next step (or as they called it, a "go-brainer"). The team consisted of ten people (on average) who were able to work closely and nimbly, similar to an indie development team. They fit Lara Croft in the Hitman Go setting and knew to change elements like less focus on assassinating foes, less board game aesthetic, more animations, and more emphasis on environment than enemies. The team chose the classic Tomb Raider visual design over that of the series reboot, but reconstructed that series aesthetic from memory rather than from its actual design documents. They sought to recreate the moments of being chased by a giant animal or boulder. In place of time restraints, like the quick time events from the series, the developers added floors that crack with each successive turn to give a sense of time-based urgency.

The team also emphasized gameplay for the player to learn without tutorial and storytelling that did not interrupt the play experience. Compared to the previous game, the developers wanted Lara Croft Go puzzles to have fewer elements and be completely visible without scrolling, such that the player could see puzzles in their entirety and focus instead on solving for the correct sequence. The camera also follows Croft rather than remaining stationary.

The game was built in the Unity game engine, which enabled faster prototyping across multiple smartphone platforms. It was also designed first to fit on the iPhone's smaller screen - a lesson learned from Hitman Go, which had been designed for tablets. The Square Enix team collaborated with Tomb Raider brand owners Crystal Dynamics to fit the series license. The player-character outfits, in particular, were informed by this exchange.

Lara Croft Go was unveiled during Square Enix's E3 2015 press conference. The game was released for Android, iOS, Windows, and Windows Phone on 27 August. A free expansion called "The Shard of Life" was released on 25 November. The PlayStation 4 and Vita versions included additional time exclusive levels "Mirror of Spirits" developed by KO_OP.

== Reception ==
Reception

Aggregate score
Aggregator	Score
Metacritic	iOS: 83/100; PS4: 84/100

Review scores
Publication	Score
Electronic Gaming Monthly	5.0/10
Game Informer	8/10
IGN	8.5/10
TouchArcade	iOS: 4.5/5
USgamer	4.5/5

The game received generally positive reviews, according to video game review aggregator Metacritic. It was named Apple's 2015 best iPhone game of the year, for "its beauty and clever design", and best mobile/handheld game at the 2015 The Game Awards. Apple recognized Lara Croft Go with one of its 2016 Apple Design Awards. Reviewers commended the game's aesthetics, puzzle design, and fidelity to the series, but criticized its short length. Critics disagreed on its degree of challenge and either found it too easy, too hard, or just right.

Chloi Rad (IGN) wrote that the game was theatrical and diorama-like in its display and attention to detail. Andrew Reiner (Game Informer) called its graphics among the best-looking smartphone games, from the vibrancy of its environments to the fluidity of its animations. While Rad felt that the game presented little challenge as a minor complaint, Reiner considered its final puzzles disproportionately challenging.

Ray Carsillo (Electronic Gaming Monthly) criticized the game's departure from Hitman Go's strict board game motif and described Lara Croft Go's art style as a "cheap ... knockoff" of the series. He found the puzzles "decent" but the game altogether not particularly challenging and not worthy of recommendation outside of series fans. Matt Peckham (Wired) was additionally confused by the game's collectibles, which he felt were too hidden and not compelling to collect. Though Jaz Rignall (USgamer) deemed the game short in length, he also called it balanced and "a perfect iOS game". Rignall added that the game appeared to have been influenced by Monument Valley.

=== Awards ===
List of awards and nominations
Award	Category	Result	Ref.
Apple Design Award 2016	Game	Won	
Apple's Best of 2015	Game of the Year	Won	
The Game Awards 2015	Best Mobile/Handheld Game	Won	
IGN's Best of 2015	Mobile Game of the Year	Won	
19th Annual D.I.C.E. Awards	Mobile Game of the Year	Nominated	
19th Annual D.I.C.E. Awards	Outstanding Achievement in Game Design	Nominated	
19th Annual D.I.C.E. Awards	Outstanding Achievement in Art Direction	Nominated	
Pocket Gamer Awards 2016	Android Game of the Year	Won	
Pocket Gamer Awards 2016	Overall Game of the Year	Won	

== See also ==
- Deus Ex Go – third title in the Go series, based on the Deus Ex franchise
