= Pneuma: Breath of Life =

2015 video game

- Developers: Deco Digital; Bevel Studios
- Publishers: Deco Digital; Bevel Studios
- Designers: David Jones; Joe Brammer; Kevin Chandler; Alex Korakitis; Howard Philpott; Kieron White; Adam Griffiths
- Engine: Unreal Engine 4
- Platforms: Microsoft Windows; PlayStation 4; Xbox One
- Release: Microsoft Windows, Xbox One; February 27, 2015; PlayStation 4; July 7, 2015
- Genres: Graphic adventure, puzzle
- Mode: Single-player

Pneuma: Breath of Life is a first-person puzzle video game developed and published by Deco Digital and Bevel Studios. The game uses a narrated story focused on self-discovery and the fundamental nature of reality. The game was designed to test the Unreal Engine 4 and Physically Based Rendering. The game intends players to think outside of the box to solve a series of environmental challenges.

Pneuma: Breath of Life uses the Unreal Engine 4 and was released on February 27, 2015 for the Xbox One and Windows. On Xbox One, it was released for free on Xbox Live to Gold members from November 1, 2015 to November 30, 2015.

Towards the end of 2015, Deco Digital and Bevel Studios merged to form Bulkhead, the developer of The Turing Test.

== Reception ==
Reception

Aggregate score
Aggregator	Score
Metacritic	XONE: 63/100; PC: 63/100; PS4: 69/100

Pneuma: Breath of Life received mixed reviews from critics.
