= Goetia (video game) =

2016 point-and-click adventure video game

- Developer: Sushee
- Publisher: Square Enix Collective
- Platforms: Microsoft Windows, macOS, Linux, Nintendo Switch, PlayStation 4, Xbox One
- Release: Microsoft Windows, macOS: WW: 14 April 2016; Linux: WW: 21 June 2016; Nintendo Switch: WW: 26 April 2018; PlayStation 4, Xbox One: WW: 18 December 2020
- Genres: Graphic adventure, puzzle
- Mode: Single-player

Goetia is a graphic adventure puzzle video game developed by Sushee and published by Square Enix Collective for Microsoft Windows, macOS, Linux, Nintendo Switch, PlayStation 4 and Xbox One.

== Reception ==
Goetia received an aggregate score of 79/100 on Metacritic for the PC version. Courtney Ehrenhofler of Adventure Gamers rated it 5/5 stars, calling it "beautifully crafted and intricately complex", and the artwork "gorgeous", but criticizing the game's lack of a hint system. Dejan Stojilovic of PLAY! Magazine rated the game 8.5/10, praising the graphics and "excellent background music", but also remarking that the lack of hints made the game cruel to beginners, and may result in them quitting the game. David Soriano of IGN Spain rated the game 7.7/10, saying that it stands out for the quality of its writing, but criticizing its heavy difficulty, which requires the player to use pen and paper to take notes.

Jon Cousins of Nintendo Life rated the game's Switch version 7/10 stars, calling it "flawed, yet engrossing".

== Sequel ==
A sequel, Goetia 2, was released on May 19, 2022.
