= Hitman Go =

2014 video game

- Developer: Square Enix Montreal
- Publisher: Square Enix
- Director: Daniel Lutz
- Series: Hitman
- Engine: Unity
- Platforms: Android, iOS, Apple TV, Windows, Windows Phone, Linux, PlayStation 4, PlayStation Vita
- Release: iOS; April 17, 2014; Android; June 4, 2014; Windows, Windows Phone; April 27, 2015; Linux, PlayStation 4, PlayStation Vita; February 23, 2016
- Genre: Puzzle
- Mode: Single-player

Hitman Go is a turn-based puzzle video game developed by Square Enix Montréal and published by Square Enix. Announced in February 2014, the game was released for iOS in April 2014 and for Android in June 2014. Windows and Windows Phone versions were released the following year in April 2015. In February 2016, a "Definitive Edition" version was released on PlayStation 4, PlayStation Vita, and on Linux and Windows via Steam. It is the first game developed by Square Enix Montréal, a studio founded in 2011. Development entered full production in 2013 and was completed by eleven people using the Unity game engine.

The player guides Agent 47, protagonist of the Hitman franchise, through a series of grid-based levels. Levels are composed of nodes and lines, and presented like a board game with characters modelled as miniature figures. Enemy characters can be dispatched by moving onto the node they occupy during a turn, similar to chess. As the player advances through levels, new enemy types and mechanics are introduced to increase the complexity of puzzle solutions.

Following its announcement, Hitman Go was met with some skepticism from critics. However, the game received a positive reception with praise for the art, aesthetics, simple gameplay mechanics, and translation of Hitman to a mobile device. It is considered among the greatest mobile games of all time. It also received several nominations and awards from gaming publications and award organisations. A successor set within the Tomb Raider franchise, titled Lara Croft Go, was released in August 2015.

== Gameplay ==
A level within Hitman Go. Agent 47 is located on the left and must be directed past enemies to the end node located in the upper right.

Hitman Go is a turn-based puzzle video game part of the Hitman video game series. In the game each level is set on a grid-based board composed of interconnected nodes and lines. Nodes are positions that the player or enemies can occupy and lines are used for moving between nodes during a turn. Players take control of the series' protagonist, Agent 47. Using touchscreen controls, during a turn the player swipes along a line in the direction they want Agent 47 to move. In the "Definitive Edition" on PC, swiping is replaced by a click, hold, and drag interaction with a mouse. Once the player completes a turn, all enemies on the board will simultaneously move. Each level has a main objective for completion, such as guiding Agent 47 to the end node or assassinating a specific target. The player can assassinate enemies by moving onto the target's node, and similarly the player can be killed by enemies that move onto the player's node.

Levels become more complex as the player progresses, introducing different mechanics and new types of enemies. Each enemy type is dressed in a unique colour, allowing the player to recognise their movement patterns. Some enemies remain static or rotate on a single node, while others will patrol the board along a specific route. Later stages may require the player to collect keys located on the board and unlock doors that block access to the level objective. Trapdoors connect one location on the board to another and allow the player to move between them during a turn. Some nodes contain potted plants, the player will not be detected while occupying these nodes. Coloured disguises can be found and equipped to let the player walk past an enemy type of that colour without being detected. There are throwable objects that are used to disrupt and change enemy behaviour patterns. Firearms can also be found on certain levels, they are used to shoot targets or obstacles from a distance.

Most levels have bonus objectives such as collecting a briefcase or finishing the level without killing anyone, completing these will reward the player with stars. Stars are used to unlock the next chapter of levels. The game launched with five different chapters, one of which was inspired by a level from Hitman: Blood Money. Post-launch, two additional chapters were added, one based upon a level from Hitman 2: Silent Assassin. The game features in-app purchases which provide hints to the puzzles or unlock level chapters immediately.

== Development and release ==
Hitman Go was developed by Canadian video game studio Square Enix Montréal. It is the first game from the developer, which was founded in late 2011 by employees of existing Square Enix Europe studios. Upon establishment, the studio announced that their first project would be a new video game in the Hitman franchise. The studio's original aspiration was creating triple-A console games within the series and expanding to a team size of 150 people. After a year, while the team was still expanding, the console game was cancelled and the studio shifted its focus to mobile games. This transition led to around one third of the staff leaving the development team.

During the concept phase there were four people working on Hitman Go. Initial prototypes were built on paper using printed out characters. The project was pitched and greenlit for production in mid 2013. Daniel Lutz served as creative director, and the team size peaked at eleven people throughout the remainder of the game's development. The studio looked at several different engines for building the game, but opted with Unity early on as it had a low barrier of entry, provided support for the main mobile platforms, and some members of the development team had previous experience creating projects in the game engine. An initial working prototype and a basic level editor were developed in a few days and after two weeks the first version of the game was presented to the remainder of the studio.

While designing Hitman Go, Lutz and his team considered some specific factors such as the game's price, gameplay time, the brand, the genre, the audience's expectation, production restraints, and the business model. Speaking about that game's genre, Lutz noted that the team could have developed an endless running game for Hitman. However, they thought that this style of game did not align with the series' values and would not be well received by its audience. Instead, they felt that translating Hitman into a board game was more appropriate as it gave players time to think and plan before executing moves. This fell in line with the idea of Hitman being a "thinking man’s game". Designers tested a feature that would let players lie in wait for targets, similar to the mainline Hitman games. This feature was cut from the final version for gameplay reasons as it allowed players to kill any target on the board and prevented the puzzles from working as intended. The artistic inspiration for the game was drawn from architectural models and dioramas. Characters were created in fixed poses without any limb animations, like chess pieces. Instead of creating detailed textures which requires additional memory, the artists chose to use colour swatches so that most characters shared materials. This method allowed them to use a variety of colours for characters without incurring many draw calls. The team chose not include dialogue, cutscenes, or a heavy narrative structure in the game, citing that people often play video games in short sessions on mobile devices.

Hitman Go was announced in February 2014. It was released for iOS on April 17, 2014, and Android on June 4, 2014. Microsoft Windows and Windows Phone versions were released on April 27, 2015. At the Electronic Entertainment Expo 2015, virtual reality (VR) technology company Oculus VR showcased a version of Hitman Go for the Samsung Gear VR device. On December 5, 2015, at the PlayStation Experience, Hitman Go was announced for PlayStation 4 and PlayStation Vita with a 2016 release date. This version was released on February 23, 2016, as the "Definitive Edition", which includes improved visuals and all additional content. The "Definitive Edition" was also released on Linux and Windows via the Steam storefront.

The PlayStation 4 version is notable for being one of the very few PlayStation 4 games not playable on the PlayStation 5 with backwards compatibility.

== Reception ==
Reception

Aggregate score
Aggregator	Score
Metacritic	iOS: 81/100; PC: 72/100; PS4: 77/100; VITA: 80/100

Review scores
Publication	Score
Destructoid	8/10
Eurogamer	7/10
GameSpot	6/10
IGN	8.2/10
Joystiq	4/5
PC Gamer (UK)	72/100
Polygon	8/10
TouchArcade	5/5

Hitman Go received "generally favorable" reviews from professional critics, according to video game review aggregator website Metacritic. Several reviewers noted that they were sceptical about the idea of Hitman departing from its roots in third-person stealth action and taking form as a mobile puzzle game, but upon playing the game admitted that it was a pleasant and creative take on the franchise.

The game's visual presentation and board game aesthetic were widely praised. Joystiq editor, Anthony John Agnello thought the colouring and motif of Hitman Go was more appealing than the visual design employed in Hitman: Absolution. He highlighted the level selection screen and use of board game boxes in the menus as positives. Writing for Destructoid, Brittany Vincent also expressed approval of the clean menus and user interface icons, and thought that the game levels resembled dollhouses. Eurogamer and IGN writers compared the character design to miniature board game pieces. The simplicity of the gameplay mechanics and minimalistic approach were praised by Polygon reviewer Arthur Gies. He believed that Hitman Go brilliantly captured and expressed elements of the series through the use of a sophisticated board game. Joystiq reviewer, Agnello called Hitman Go an impressive debut title for Square Enix Montréal and said that the play style suited touch-based devices. Reviewers complimented the replay value and challenge found in completing the additional bonus objectives.

One aspect of the game's design that drew criticism was that limitations of the grid system had led to a lack of paths available to complete a level. While Gies of Polygon thought that the mechanics of distraction and murder had been interpreted well in the board game setup, he was disappointed that some levels could not be completed without killing non-target guards. Vincent of Destructoid also shared this opinion, disappointed that an element core to the Hitman series had been stripped away. Both Eurogamer and IGN writers thought that the in-app purchases were overpriced but remarked that they could be easily ignored when level solutions are so regularly shared on the Internet. Reviewing the "Definitive Edition", Phil Savage of PC Gamer stressed that the PC version failed to cover up its mobile roots. He found the click and drag mouse interaction to be less than ideal but still complimented the game's aesthetics and gameplay. GameSpot writer Mat Paget was left dismayed with the VR version of Hitman Go. He felt that the game failed to offer the escapism he expected from a virtual reality game. While he admitted the game itself was excellent, he dissuaded readers from purchasing the VR version remarking that it was not worth the hassle.

Hitman Go received two nominations—Best Visual Design, Best Mobile Game—at the 2014 Golden Joystick Awards, and in 2015 the game was nominated in two categories—Debut Game, Mobile & Handheld—at the 11th British Academy Games Awards. GameSpot and IGN both listed Hitman Go as a nominee for Best Mobile Game of 2014 in their end of year lists. The game also received two awards in the Best Game Design and Best iOS Game categories at the 2014 Canadian Videogame Awards. At the 2014 National Academy of Video Game Trade Reviewers (NAVGTR) awards Hitman Go received a nomination for the category Game, Special Class.

== Successors ==
At E3 2015, Square Enix Montréal announced Lara Croft Go, a successor to Hitman Go set within the Tomb Raider universe. It was released on August 27, 2015. In the game, players use touchscreen controls to move Lara Croft around a level composed of nodes and lines. While the core mechanics and design are similar to Hitman Go, the developers did not want Lara Croft Go to feel like a re-skin, so an emphasis has been placed on the puzzle-driven exploration and gameplay elements of the Tomb Raider brand. The following year, Square Enix Montréal announced a similar title Deus Ex Go, based on the Deus Ex series.
