= Battalion 1944 =

2019 video game

- Developer: Bulkhead
- Publisher: Square Enix Collective
- Producer: Joe Brammer
- Designer: David Jones
- Programmers: Kevin Chandler, James Tatum
- Artists: Howard Philpott, Alex Korakitis, Kieron White, Nathan Knight, Faye Smith, Adriel Lamam, James McCarthy, Tomasz Marczak
- Composer: Pitstop Productions
- Engine: Unreal Engine 4
- Platform: Windows
- Release: 23 May 2019
- Genre: First-person shooter
- Mode: Multiplayer

Battalion 1944 is a multiplayer first-person shooter video game developed by Bulkhead and published by Square Enix Collective and released for Windows. The game was announced via a Kickstarter campaign in February 2016, and released on 23 May 2019. The game is set during World War II and runs on Unreal Engine 4. Bulkhead is a collaborative effort between companies Deco Digital and Bevel Studios. Versions for the PlayStation 4 and Xbox One were also announced but never released.

== Development ==
The game's crowdfunding campaign was successfully funded in under three days. In the announcement, Bulkhead Interactive stated that the game would feature dedicated servers while making use of certain anti-cheat measures. The game was released on early access on 1 February 2018, and officially released on 23 May 2019.

== Controversy ==
The project ended up being very controversial after the developers failed to launch the promised console versions despite selling keys for PlayStation 4 and Xbox One digital copies during the Kickstarter campaign. The development focused fully on the PC version and thousands of console gamers were left out of pocket with no game and no communication from Bulkhead. Bulkhead later refunded all Kickstarter backers in July 2023.

The console version was officially cancelled on August 9, 2022, with the PC version going free to play.

== Reception ==
IGN Spain considered it a good, classic take on modern first-person shooters that would be enjoyed by people seeking a World War II experience that's also competitive.
