= Square Enix Collective =

Division focusing on indie developers

- Type: Division
- Industry: Video games
- Founded: 2014
- Founders: Phil Elliott
- Headquarters: Blackfriars, London, United Kingdom
- Number of employees: 4
- Parent: Square Enix Limited
- Website: collective.square-enix.com

Square Enix Collective is an indie games division of Square Enix Limited. Created by Phil Elliott in 2014, it is a self-titled "service provider for Indie developers", which helps get a developer's game published while they maintain their creative control.

== History ==
First announced by former journalist Phil Elliott in November 2013 at Game Developers Conference Next, former Eidos Interactive intellectual properties (IPs) were potentially available for developers. In February 2015, Fear Effect, Gex and Anachronox were available to pitch. Originally Collective partnered with Indiegogo for crowdfunding.

In 2016, developers would submit a pitch to the company on a rolling basis. The pitches would then be presented to the public through the Collective's website, and a polling process would take place once a week, with anyone welcome to vote on the projects that excited them. While the polling process was not the sole determinate for which developers the Collective would assist, it played a pivotal role. Square Enix took five percent of the games' revenue after fees.

According to Square Enix, it helped with Kickstarter fundraising campaigns raising $1.2m in total. Notable games which had campaigns include Moonlighter, Ultimate Chicken Horse and Moon Hunters. In October 2018, the company announced they would be closing their platform for campaign curation, instead focusing on larger and specific products without the element of public polling. In August 2022, Bulkhead Interactive ended its relationship with Collective and said it was disappointed Battalion 1944 did not release on consoles. In February 2023, Elliott left Square Enix and became CEO of publisher Modern Wolf.

== Games published ==
Release	Title	Developer(s)	Platform(s)	Ref(s).
2016	Goetia	Sushee	Microsoft Windows, OS X, Linux	
2016	The Turing Test	Bulkhead	PS4, Xbox One, Microsoft Windows, Nintendo Switch	
2017	Tokyo Dark	Cherrymochi	Microsoft Windows	
2017	Children of Zodiarcs	Cardboard Utopia	Microsoft Windows, Nintendo Switch, PS4, Xbox One, Mac	
2017	Black the Fall	Sand Sailor Studio	Microsoft Windows, PS4, Xbox One	
2017	Deadbeat Heroes	Deadbeat Productions	Microsoft Windows	
2017	Oh My Godheads	Titutitech	Microsoft Windows	
2018	Octahedron: Transfixed Edition	Demimonde	Nintendo Switch	
2018	Fear Effect Sedna	Sushee	Microsoft Windows, PS4, Xbox One, Switch	
2018	Forgotton Anne	ThroughLine Games	macOS, Microsoft Windows, PS4, Xbox One, Switch, iOS, Android	
2018	Boundless	Wonderstruck Games	Microsoft Windows	
2019	Battalion 1944	Bulkhead	Microsoft Windows	
2021	Circuit Superstars	Original Fire Games	PS4, Xbox One, Microsoft Windows, Switch	
2022	PowerWash Simulator	FuturLab	Microsoft Windows, Xbox One, Xbox Series X/S, Nintendo Switch, PS4, PS5	
2023	Little Goody Two Shoes	AstralShift	Microsoft Windows, Xbox Series X|S, PlayStation 5, Nintendo Switch	
