= Reign of Fury =

British thrash metal band

- Origin: England, United Kingdom
- Genres: Thrash metal, heavy metal
- Years active: 2009–present
- Members: Bison Steed; Joey Jaycock; Jon Priestley; Magic Dave Humphries; Chris 'Muzz' Musgrove
- Past members: Matt Earl; Paul Bielby; Ross "Lenny" McLennan; Ed Westlake
- Website: reignoffury.co.uk

Reign of Fury are a British thrash metal band who are based predominantly in South West England and The Midlands. Their signature sound is a blend of 1980s thrash metal and NWOBHM, as well as various influences from other styles of metal and punk. The members are an amalgamation of friends that have met over the past 15 years on the UK punk and metal scene. Reign of Fury was formed to celebrate the types of music that provided the most significant influences to the members throughout their lives.

== History ==
=== Early years and formation (2006–2009) ===
Logo

The original idea for Reign of Fury was born in a pub in Cheltenham where the lead guitarist, Ed drank in 2006. He had known drummer, Magic Dave, for many years, having supported his previous punk band 4 ft Fingers at various gigs. After numerous discussions about forming a metal band, the original line-up finally came together. Originally called Reign of Terror, they changed the name to Reign of Fury quite early on. They played their first show at The Fish and Fiddle (now closed down) in Cheltenham and split up straight afterwards.

Two years later, in 2008, Magic Dave left the UK punk band 4 ft Fingers. He and fellow 4 ft Fingers member Jon Priestley decided that they wanted to keep writing music together, and Magic Dave introduced Ed to Jon. They started writing material under the name "The Ransom" with the idea of being a punk band. After numerous rehearsals together, the riffs being written seemed to be heading in a far more metal direction. "The Ransom" didn't seem to suit the music that was being written, and so the name was changed to "Reign of Fury".

After about 6 months together, after hearing the instrumental demos they had recorded, Heavy Matt Earl, joined them on bass, having already been in another band, Screamin 88s, with Magic Dave for a while. The band continued to write music, but were still lacking a vocalist. They tried out various singers to no avail, desperate to find somebody with the right vocal style for their sound, until eventually, in late 2009, Jon Priestley called upon friend Bison (Matt Steed), who was at that time playing bass for hardcore band Section 13. Jon and Bison had worked together for many years in punk band Gash and experimental band Black Flame Dispute. After hearing what the band had to offer, Bison did some sample vocals over a few of the demo tracks Reign of Fury had recorded, songs which would later appear on the Psycho Intentions E.P. The band finally now clicked as a unit and established their signature sound.

Reign of Fury officially became a full band in late 2009 and played their first show at The 2 Pigs in Cheltenham on 16 January 2010 supporting Tewkesbury band Lumphammer.

=== Psycho Intentions and World Detonation (2010–2012) ===
The band played a few shows in 2010 and only 7 shows in 2011 but continued to write additional material.

Reign of Fury released their first E.P. in February 2011, Psycho Intentions. Drums and bass were recorded on a simple 16-track in a tin shack on a farm in Tewkesbury whilst guitars and vocals were recorded by Jon Priestley at Abatis Studios (in the early incarnation of Abatis Studios i.e. Jon's garden shed).

Psycho Intentions E.P. was distributed through Goodlife Recordings. This coincided with their DIY video for the title track of the E.P, filmed and edited by Matt Earl & Ed Westlake from the band. It was originally made back in 2010, being added to the post 9pm rotation on the UK alternative music channel SCUZZ. The E.P artwork, by UK artist Matt Dixon was chosen out of the band's desire to have a mascot and the skeleton figure on the front cover is set to appear on all upcoming releases.

Things started to pick up for Reign of Fury in 2011 with more shows being played. They then began to work on their first album again self-recorded & produced. In 2012 they were asked to play their first metal festival show at Bloodstock 2012. They appeared on the New Blood stage on Sunday 12 August 2012.

The band's debut album World Detonation was released in August 2012 set to coincide with their 1st Bloodstock performance which set the band on course to perform on bigger stages. Shortly afterwards, their first video from the album, title track "World Detonation" was released. The second video "Born to Die" was released on Halloween 2012.

=== Headbangers' Balls (2013–2014) ===
The band had a number of tour dates in 2013, both in the UK and Europe. They rounded the year off with a national headlining tour in support of Teenage Cancer Trust called "Headbangers' Balls". The line-up for each night was different with Reign of Fury the only constant band on the bill. One date clash in Newcastle with Hatebreed resulted in the latter inviting Reign of Fury and their support to open for them, and donating their proceeds from the gig to the Headbangers' Balls cause. The tour culminated with an all-day event in Birmingham that was broadcast live on TBFM Online Radio.

Headbangers' Balls II made a bigger impact in 2014 with several sold-out shows and bigger audiences across the board including the likes of Onslaught and Evil Deth (Lawnmower Deth fronted by Dr. Rabid Hell, vocalist of Evil Scarecrow).

In early 2014, the band parted ways with original bassist Matt Earl aka Heavy Matt Earl due to family commitments. Andy Pilkington stood in for two shows until the recruitment of Paul Bielby in February 2014.

=== Death Be Thy Shepherd (2015) ===
After the successful release of critically acclaimed second LP 'Death Be Thy Shepherd' the band toured extensively across the UK including opening Bloodstock Festival.

The Kickstarter campaign followed for the vinyl release of 'Death Be Thy Shepherd' and reached target in 11 minutes (a suggested record for an unsigned band)

At this point guitarist Ed Westlake left the band for personal reasons.

The band toured their planned headline 2015/2016 dates with new lead guitarist Ross 'Lenny' Mclennan, with shows including support with Sepultura on their 30th Anniversary Tour and Lawnmower Deth's Xmas Bash at Nottingham Rock City.

=== Exorcise Reality (2019) ===
Reign of Fury released their 3rd album "Exorcise Reality" in October 2019 on digital format only with Chris Musgrove replacing Paul Bielby on bass and Joey Jaycock taking over on guitar from Lenny.

=== Exorcise Reality (2020) ===
Due to the success of the digi release of "Exorcise Reality", Reign of Fury decided to release the album on CD in May and Vinyl in June.

== Members ==
Current

- Vocals – Bison Wrathbone (ex Gash, Black Flame Dispute, Section 13)
- Lead Guitar - Joey Jaycock (From Eden to Exile, Conscript, Bludvera, Apparitions of the End)
- Guitar – Jon Priestly (ex Gash, Black Flame Dispute, 4 ft Fingers)
- Bass – Chris 'Muzz' Musgrove
- Drums – Magic Dave (4 ft Fingers, Screamin 88s, U.K. Subs)

Former

- Lead guitar – Ed Westlake (ex Stubborn Stains, The Beyond, Manifest)
- Bass 2009 – 2014 Matt Earl "Heavy Matt Earl " ( ex Blasphemy, Dangerous Babies, Whippasnappa, Screamin' 88s )
- Bass 2014 – 2016 Paul Bielby (ex w0t, Four Floors of Whores)
- Lead Guitar - Ross McLennan (ex Terrathorn, Echovirus, Apparitions of the End, ) current Abhorrent Decimation

== Discography ==
Extended plays

- Psycho Intentions (Feb 2011)

Studio albums

- World Detonation (2012)
- Death Be Thy Shepherd (2015)
- Exorcise Reality (2019)

Music videos

- Psycho Intentions
  - "Psycho Intentions" (2010)
  - "Disconnect" (2012)
- World Detonation
  - "World Detonation" (2012)
  - "Born To Die" (2012)
  - "Envy the Dead"
- Death Be Thy Shepherd
  - "The Love of a Dying God" (2015)
