= Deus Ex Go =

2016 video game

- Developer: Square Enix Montreal
- Publisher: Square Enix
- Series: Deus Ex
- Engine: Unity
- Platforms: Android, iOS, Windows, Windows 10 Mobile
- Release: August 18, 2016
- Genre: Puzzle
- Mode: Single-player

Deus Ex Go is a 2016 turn-based puzzle video game in the Deus Ex series by Square Enix. The player uses a touchscreen to move Adam Jensen, a protagonist from the cyberpunk-themed series, as a puzzle piece through a board game while avoiding obstacles and manipulating the environment. In-keeping with the main series, Jensen can hack environmental features such as turrets and platforms to bypass and eliminate enemies. The game follows the format of Hitman Go (2014) and Lara Croft Go (2015), in which Square Enix Montréal distilled major motifs from the games' respective series to fit turn-based, touchscreen, puzzle gameplay. New to the Go series, Deus Ex Go introduced an in-game story and puzzle creation mode. Deus Ex Go was released in August 2016, for Android and iOS platforms to generally favorable reviews. The game was later ported to Microsoft platforms. Critics wrote that the game successfully captured the cybernetic dystopia of the Deus Ex series and the brain teasing puzzles of the Go mobile game series. But compared to the other entries in the Go series, reviewers considered Deus Ex Go's to be less creative, with a lackluster story, less visually interesting aesthetic, and shorter length.

Embracer Group, following their acquisition of Square Enix Montréal, announced that Deus Ex Go would be removed from app stores with its servers shut down on January 4, 2023. Deca Games acquired Deus Ex Go and other mobile titles from the studio, and made them available again in April 2024.

== Gameplay ==
In this screenshot of gameplay, Jensen (left) must reach the exit node without being killed by the guard. A computer terminal nearby controls a turret to help with this.

The player touches the screen to move Adam Jensen, a protagonist from the stealth combat, cyber-dystopian Deus Ex series, between nodes on a hexagonal grid towards an exit. If moved to a specific node, the character will stealthily take down guards, hack computers, and activate his human augmentations, such as invisibility. Enemies who spot Jensen will move towards and, if they reach his node, eliminate him. Alternatively, Jensen can eliminate enemies if approaching from behind or their side. In the game's story, which is set before the events of Deus Ex: Mankind Divided, Jensen's sole mission is to save an important person, but is continually set back by puzzles—54 in total.

The puzzles grow in complexity by adding complications to several simple mechanics. Mechanical enemies and obstacles, such as gun turrets and raisable platforms, are hackable via computer terminals on nearby nodes. The player drags their finger on the touchscreen to connect the terminal's node and the hackable device. The character can store a power-up to move for two turns without detection while in an enemy's line of sight, activate terminals remotely, or use projectile attacks against guards on distant nodes. The main game runs about three hours in length, and the player can purchase puzzle solutions through microtransactions. An additional puzzle design node—also new to the Go series—lets players make single-screen puzzles to share with others. Square Enix highlights five new puzzles in a weekly rotation. As part of a tie-in with Deus Ex: Mankind Divided, players complete the main story and weekly puzzles in the mobile game to unlock perks in the console title.

== Development ==
Deus Ex Go follows the premise behind Square Enix Montreal's previous Go mobile series titles—Lara Croft Go (2015) and Hitman Go (2014)—in distilling the essence of the series' core gameplay for turn- and touchscreen-based puzzles. The Deus Ex Go development team was split between employees who had worked on Hitman: Sniper and those who had worked on the Go series. Their combination was expected to resolve philosophical differences between the teams stemming from indie and AAA traditions of game development and pricing. Throughout development, the team asked themselves whether the Go elements felt as if they belonged to the Deus Ex series. The team sampled several kinds of hacking mechanics before deciding to use terminals that modified each puzzle rather than performing single-use instrumental kills. They also decided to add a narrative—the first in the Go series—drawing from its importance in the main series. Several elements from the series did not translate well to mobile, such as player choice, which had too many possibilities to suit the game's puzzle-solving. The team also invested in tools that made puzzle construction easier. Prior games took three months to make 25 puzzles, while Deus Ex Go's tool nearly tripled their output. As a result, the team planned post-release puzzles and a tool for players to create their own. This new puzzle design mode released, as planned, two months after the game's launch. Designer Étienne Giroux compared their choice to release a new daily puzzle with progressive difficulty peaking on Fridays to the regularity of The New York Times crossword puzzles. Square Enix said that the game's puzzles were more difficult than those of previous games, and unlike the prior two Go games, Deus Ex Go uses a hexagonal grid instead of squares. Square Enix announced Deus Ex Go at a press event in advance of the June 2016 Electronic Entertainment Expo. It was released on August 18, 2016, for Android and iOS platforms on both phones and tablets. The game was later ported to Windows and Windows 10 Mobile, and the team later released a documentary video on their development process.

Embracer Group, following their acquisition of Square Enix Montréal, announced that Deus Ex Go would be removed from app stores with its servers shut down on January 4, 2023.

== Reception ==
Prior to the game's release, Ryan McCaffrey (IGN) wrote that the Go series composed the "smartest" mobile entries of a high-budget, major video game series. Critics who previewed the game found it to be on par with the other Go titles. Colin Campbell (Polygon) said that previews of the game matched the series' aesthetic.

Reception

Aggregate score
Aggregator	Score
Metacritic	81/100

Review scores
Publication	Score
GameSpot	8/10
Gamezebo	3.5/5
IGN	8.4/10
TouchArcade	4/5

The game received "generally favorable" reviews, according to video game review aggregator Metacritic. Reviewers wrote that the game successfully captured the cybernetic dystopia of the Deus Ex series and the brain-teasing puzzles of the Go mobile game series. Compared to the other entries in the Go series, reviewers considered Deus Ex Go's added story to be lackluster, its aesthetic to be less visually interesting, and its length to be shorter. While some reviewers tired of the Go series, others thought Deus Ex Go continued the high standards of its forebears.

Among the most satisfying moments in the Go series, the IGN and TouchArcade reviewers appreciated the game mechanic of determining how best to use a hack or drone to slip past enemies. The IGN reviewer found the game's puzzles somewhat harder than those of its predecessors, but was able to easily resolve them upon after taking brief breaks. The game's minimalism also led to some complications. Some of the solutions, he complained, were dependent on unintuitive player experimentation, such as realizing that the invisibility device also served as a projectile. Some of these visual cues were lost amidst the game's visual presentation. TouchArcade wondered whether the simplified environment was an aesthetic choice or the result of efforts to save on development costs. The GameSpot reviewer was disappointed to see an option for paid puzzle solutions in an otherwise short game about discovering the secret to a puzzle on one's own. Compared to the main series, in which the player may stake out a building at a distance, the experimentation in Deus Ex Go is limited to finding the right answer rather than finding multiple routes to solve the same problem.

IGN wrote that the game's story and environments remained in the background and were ultimately forgettable, or in the case of the former, a hindrance, especially when the scenes could not be skipped on later replays. By the same token, predecessors such as Lara Croft Go hid treasures in its background such that players would revisit its levels, but Deus Ex Go had little to interest players besides its primary mission. The game's sole challenge of completing the puzzle in the fewest moves, GameSpot explained, quickly became uninteresting. Gamezebo's reviewer instead faulted the series and wrote that after three games, its formula felt repetitive. TouchArcade concluded that, unlike the other Go games, Deus Ex Go was less creative overall and did not subvert the themes of its parent series quite like the others.

During the 20th Annual D.I.C.E. Awards, the Academy of Interactive Arts & Sciences nominated Deus Ex Go for "Strategy/Simulation Game of the Year".
