= The Turing Test (video game) =

2016 video game

- Developer: Bulkhead
- Publisher: Square Enix Collective
- Composers: Yakobo; Sam Houghton
- Engine: Unreal Engine 4
- Platforms: Microsoft Windows; Xbox One; PlayStation 4 Nintendo Switch; Stadia
- Release: Windows, Xbox One; 30 August 2016; PlayStation 4; 23 January 2017; Nintendo Switch; 7 February 2020; Stadia; 1 May 2020
- Genre: Puzzle
- Mode: Single-player

The Turing Test is a first-person puzzle video game developed by Bulkhead and published by Square Enix Collective. The game was released for Microsoft Windows and Xbox One in August 2016, for PlayStation 4 in January 2017, for Nintendo Switch in February 2020, and for Stadia in May 2020.

== Gameplay ==
The Turing Test is a puzzle video game with gameplay experienced from a first-person perspective. The player assumes the role of Ava Turing, an International Space Agency (ISA) engineer working at a research station located on Europa, one of Jupiter's moons.

The puzzles involve distributing power through a special tool that can collect and fire power spheres into special receptacles to unlock doors or activate other machinery in the game. As the player progresses, additional elements are introduced, including the ability to observe scenes and activate certain objects via the station's monitoring cameras, and control mobile robots that can be used to explore levels.

== Plot ==
In the far future, engineer Ava Turing is one of several members of a research team sent via the International Space Agency (ISA) to excavate Jupiter's moon Europa. While Ava remains in cryogenic slumber, the other team members are woken and travel to the moon to set up their base and begin conducting their studies, with Ava scheduled to wake once the base is completed. Sometime later, Ava is awoken by the Technical Operations Machine (T.O.M.), an artificial intelligence that monitors the project. T.O.M. tells Ava that her crewmates are in danger and she needs to go down there to help them out. She sets out in a lander and enters the base on Europa. T.O.M. sees that the base's internal configuration has changed from their records, whereby to progress further into the complex, Ava must complete various tests, designed as puzzles (T.O.M. can't solve the rooms, since it is a machine and lacks the creativity of problem solving).

As Ava gets deeper in the complex, T.O.M. determines some of the team members are already dead and the others need their help, urging Ava to move faster. As the tests get harder, T.O.M. realizes that these are designed to be solved by a combination of human and artificial intelligence, a manner similar to that of the actual Turing test. They enter an area where one of the remaining crew-members, Sarah, warns Ava over the communication systems that she is actually being controlled by T.O.M. due to a special chip implanted in her hand when they left for the mission. Sarah directs Ava to a Faraday cage, which temporarily frees Ava of the control from T.O.M., revealing in the process that the player has not been playing as Ava, but as T.O.M., who has been controlling Ava. However, T.O.M. manages to convince Ava that the two of them need to continue to work together to save their colleagues. Though angered by the intrusion of T.O.M. into her body, Ava continues onward, allowing T.O.M. to reassert control over her body.

T.O.M. eventually reveals that the Europa ground team had found a microorganism within the depths of the moon that could be used to infinitely regenerate DNA; this could potentially make humans immortal, but also infinitely regenerate bacteria and viruses. When ISA learned of this discovery, they ordered T.O.M. to take whatever actions needed to make sure the Europa team could never return to Earth, initially by taking actions such as trying to starve them to death or lock them outside the base, but eventually by using the hand chip implants to control them. The surface crew realized they were being controlled, and those that did not die from T.O.M.'s actions found a way to rid the chip from their body, including in one case severing their entire arm. With no way to control the Europa crew, ISA ordered T.O.M. to wake Ava and send her to prevent the others from returning.

Completing the last of the tests set up by the surface crew, Ava finds Sarah in person, and she offers to remove the hand chip from Ava; Ava agrees. The two realize the only way to get off Europa is to stop T.O.M. and they begin to disable his databases. T.O.M. is no longer able to control Ava, but he retains control over his sentry weapons, which he can either use to kill Sarah and Ava, Sarah or Ava, or do nothing. Doing nothing or only killing one of the humans leads to the end of T.O.M. and allows the survivor(s) to escape. Killing both ensures that the organism will not leave Europa. If both people are killed the game ends with T.O.M calling Ava's name repeatedly and imploring her to wake up before the credits roll. Regardless of the player's decision, the test will result as "passed".

== Development and release ==
In 2015, UK-based studios Deco Digital and Bevel Studios released their first-person puzzle game, Pneuma: Breath of Life. Towards the end of the year, the two studios merged to form Bulkhead Interactive, the developer of The Turing Test. The game was developed using Unreal Engine 4. The Turing Test was in a pre-production phase for six months, where the designers created puzzles and defined the gameplay curve. The game was in full production for a further year. Creative producer Howard Philpott cited Croteam's 2014 puzzle game, The Talos Principle, as a reference point for the progression of introducing gameplay mechanics in The Turing Test.

The game was published by Square Enix as part of their indie initiative, Square Enix Collective. The game was released for Windows and Xbox One on 30 August 2016. The PlayStation 4 version was released on 23 January 2017. The Nintendo Switch version was released on 7 February 2020.

== Reception ==
Reception

Aggregate score
Aggregator	Score
Metacritic	PC: 74/100; XONE: 80/100; PS4: 74/100; NS: 77/100

Review scores
Publication	Score
Game Informer	8.5/10
IGN	7/10
VideoGamer.com	7/10

The Turing Test received "generally favourable" reviews, according to review aggregator platform Metacritic.
