= Bulkhead (company) =

British video game developer

- Formerly: Bulkhead Interactive
- Type: Private
- Industry: Video games
- Predecessor: Deco Digital
- Founded: November 2015; 11 years ago
- Founder: Joe Brammer; David Jones; Howard Philpott
- Headquarters: Derby, England
- Number of locations: 2
- Key people: Joe Brammer (CEO)
- Products: Pneuma: Breath of Life; The Turing Test; Battalion 1944; Wardogs
- Owner: Everplay Group (20%); HIRO Capital
- Number of employees: 100 (as of 2021)
- Parent: Super Media Group
- Subsidiaries: Bulkhead Darkhorse; Bulkhead Phoenix
- Website: bulkhead.com

Bulkhead (stylised in all caps, formerly Bulkhead Interactive) is a British video game developer. It was formed in Derby, England, from the merger of Deco Digital and Bevel Studios Bulkhead in November 2015 by University of Derby graduates Joe Brammer, David Jones, and Howard Philpott after Brammer submitted for access to a Xbox One development kits and Unreal Engine licence.

Prior to the merger, the studios developed puzzle game Pneuma: Breath of Life (2015), which made over £400,000 in its few months, and helped towards founding Bulkhead. Bulkhead developed puzzle game The Turing Test, published by Square Enix Collective in 2016. In 2018, video game publisher Square Enix acquired 20% of Bulkhead and Battalion 1944 was published Collective in 2019.

Battalion 1944 became the company's biggest game, selling over 500,000 units. Bulkhead opened a new studio in Munich to expand talents in Europe and fight Brexit. In August 2022, Bulkhead was purchased by Splash Damage, a subsidiary of Tencent, but left when they declined the idea for their new game Wardogs, which was later published by Team17. HIRO Capital helped Bulkhead go independent in December 2025.

== History ==
Bulkhead Interactive was founded in Derby, England from the merger of Deco Digital and Bevel Studios in November 2015. Staff included producer Joe Brammer, lead designer David Jones, lead programmer Kevin Chandler and creative lead Howard Philpott. Brammer first got the idea to start a company after he applied to a form that allowed developers to submit to Microsoft for an Xbox One development kit and licence to Unreal Engine. Brammer said to GamesRadar+ that he lied on the form, saying he worked for several people. He co-created the first-person puzzle video game Pneuma: Breath of Life with people from his university course (including Jones and Philpott), marking it the first video game technically created by Bulkhead and the first Unreal Engine 4 video game on Xbox One. The game made over £400,000 in its first six months, which helped in the founding of Bulkhead.

Pneuma: Breath of Life was developed by two studios, one called Deco Digital, which was founded by Brammer, and the other called Bevel Studios, a studio that was partnered with Deco Digital; they both merged to form Bulkhead. Bulkhead released its first game under their name, The Turing Test, published by Square Enix Collective in August 2016. In March 2017, Square Enix Collective was announced to publish Battalion 1944. In 2018, a 20% stake in Bulkhead was acquired by video game publisher Square Enix, building on the developer's prior partnership with the Square Enix Collective indie label.

It released Battalion 1944 in 2019, which was a commercial success and sold over 580,000 units, hitting three times its goal in a month. Shortly after launch, Bulkhead announced that they would be investing £650,000 in esports for Battalion 1944. In July 2018, Bulkhead opened a new office in Munich in the state of Bavaria to access new talents in Europe and combat Brexit. In February 2020, Bulkhead moved to a new office of over 6,000 ft at Cardinal Square in Derby. Meanwhile, they also renamed their office in Munich to Bulkhead Darkhorse and their office in Derby to Bulkhead Phoenix.

In August 2022 Bulkhead ended their relationships with Square Enix because the console ports for Battalion 1944 were cancelled. In December 2022, Bulkhead was purchased by Splash Damage, which is owned by Tencent, although Bulkhead quickly left when they proposed their now most popular video game, Wardogs, with a budget of £10 million to £12 million, but Tencent declined the idea and said it was "throwing money at people and problems". After this, Bulkhead joined a consortium with Team17, who liked the idea, and in 2026, Wardogs was announced as a "Tactical All Out Warfare". In December 2025, HIRO Capital bought part of Bulkhead and helped it go independent. In March 2026, Bulkhead moved their office in Derby to a train shed in Sadler Gate. In November 2026, Bulkhead announced it was taking its first break for a month.

== Controversies and incidents ==
In July 2026, Bulkhead was suspended on Twitch after a developer threw a yellow dildo at another developer mid-match in Wardogs. In September 2026, Joe Brammer's statement in an interview about developers at Bulkhead having to work intensely and overtime and not hiring people advocating against crunch, received backlash. Shortly afterwards, he issued a response to Eurogamer and apologised for the statement. In September 2026, Bulkhead got backlash from its playerbase on Wardogs for seemingly, "prioritising live streamers over players." Players began review bombing the game on Steam, and Bulkhead later responded by saying, "We are dickheads". In October 2026, Bulkhead received backlash for "rushing" season two of their video game, Wardogs. Bulkhead responded by saying, "We've got to slow down".

== Video games ==
Year	Title	Publisher	Platform(s)	Notes	Ref.
2015	Pneuma: Breath of Life		Windows, PlayStation 4, Xbox One	Developed by Deco Digital and Bevel Studios	
2016	The Turing Test	Square Enix Collective	Windows, Xbox One, PlayStation 4, Nintendo Switch, Stadia		
2019	Battalion 1944	Square Enix Collective	Windows		
2022	Killrun (Note: Stylised in all caps)		Windows		
TBA	Wardogs	Team17	Windows	Released as an early access game in 2026	

== Awards and nominations ==
=== As Deco Digital ===
Year	Award	Category	Result	Ref
2015	Develop Industry Excellence Awards	New Studio	Nominated	
