= Square Enix Montreal =

Canadian video game developer

Square Enix Montréal
- Type: Subsidiary
- Industry: Video games
- Founded: November 21, 2011; 14 years ago
- Founder: Lee Singleton
- Defunct: November 1, 2022
- Headquarters: Montreal, Canada
- Number of locations: 2 (2022)
- Key people: Patrick Naud (studio head)
- Products: Go series
- Number of employees: 160 (2022)
- Parent: Square Enix Europe (2011–2022); CDE Entertainment (2022)

Square Enix Montréal was a Canadian video game developer based in Montreal. It created the Go series of turn-based puzzle games for mobile devices based on former Eidos Interactive intellectual properties.

Square Enix Montréal was founded in November 2011 as a traditional studio under Square Enix Europe. Initially planning to create a new Hitman series game for consoles and employ several hundred people, its parent company mandated it to produce mobile games in 2013. The company developed prototypes for two mobile Hitman games, which became the board game-inspired puzzle game Hitman Go (2014) and the shooter Hitman: Sniper (2015). The commercial success of the latter and the critical success of the former led to two additional titles in the Go series: Lara Croft Go (2015), based on the Tomb Raider series, and Deus Ex Go (2016), based on the Deus Ex series. It focused on free-to-play games after 2016 and later added the London-based studio Square Enix London Mobile founded in 2021.

Embracer Group acquired Square Enix Montréal alongside several other Square Enix Europe assets in August 2022, which formed CDE Entertainment. The studio was briefly rebranded Onoma in October 2022 before it closed the next month.

== History ==
=== Formation (2011–2013) ===
Video game developer Square Enix announced the opening of Square Enix Montréal on November 21, 2011, aiming to debut operations in 2012 with 150 employees headed by Lee Singleton, a former general manager at Square Enix London Studios. The new studio was founded to create high-production quality (AAA) titles within Square Enix intellectual properties. Its first project was a new Hitman series game for home consoles, to be co-developed with another Square Enix subsidiary, IO Interactive of Denmark, which created the series and was at work on Hitman: Absolution (2012). Square Enix Montréal began with four staff members—Singleton and three developers from IO Interactive—but planned to grow beyond the single Hitman team to have multiple concurrent projects with up to 150 employees. Singleton planned a slow design process, with no rush to production. The studio also received support from the Quebecois government.

=== Go series (2013–2016) ===
Spurred by company-wide changes beginning late the next year and Square Enix's decision to designate a studio to focus on mobile games, Square Enix Montréal pivoted to mobile game development with an emphasis on the Hitman franchise and tablet computers in June 2013. Patrick Naud became its director. The studio quietly cancelled its work on the Hitman console game, while IO Interactive assumed a similar project. Many employees left to work on AAA titles elsewhere and those who stayed became vested in the ethos of a smaller studio, leaving their siloed specialty areas to work as generalists across specialties, as necessitated by smaller teams. The company spent two weeks designing proposals for mobile Hitman series games, which led to Hitman Go (2014) and Hitman: Sniper (2015). The former began the Go series of highly manicured, turn-based, board game-style puzzle video games, while the latter more closely resembled a traditional mobile game in which players competitively shoot targets through the scope of a sniper rifle. Though Hitman Go and the subsequent Lara Croft Go (2015, based on the Tomb Raider series) received awards, critical acclaim, and modest sales, Hitman: Sniper became the studio's revenue generator.

This work was considered novel in an industry where major companies created free-to-play games rather than small games with small teams. But the two styles of mobile games—opposite ends of indie and AAA development cultures—clashed, and divided the studio's internal identity. They intended to resolve this conflict with Deus Ex Go (2016), whose development team was split evenly between the Go series and Sniper staff and intended to mix the "tight, hand-crafted feel" of the former with the "ongoing updates" of the latter. The studio employed about 40 people at the time of Deus Ex Go's release, who clustered together in a space once designed for several hundred people. The company has not released information on its future plans, though based on Square Enix's philosophy of each studio covering its own niche well, they are expected to continue making mobile games. Its recent hires included indie developers Teddy Dief, designer of Hyper Light Drifter, and Renaud Bédard, sole programmer of Fez.

Square Enix Montréal's Go series was released to high praise. Ryan McCaffrey of IGN wrote that the first two releases were the "smartest" mobile games of any console franchise. Sam Loveridge of Digital Spy summarized the series as immensely successful. The games use simple touchscreen gameplay mechanics to move the main characters from each screen around a minimalist board game-like puzzle. With each entry, Square Enix Montréal distills and reinterprets the parent series' essential gameplay elements for the board game format. Hitman Go was released in 2014, Lara Croft Go (of the Tomb Raider series) in 2015, and Deus Ex Go of the Deus Ex series in 2016. The studio released documentary videos on their Go series development process. The Go games reached a wider audience than Sniper, and half of their players found the games through App Store or friend recommendations. The studio partially attributes their success with the series to their unique position of being able to work with major franchises with the resources of a larger company, while retaining the smaller size and flexibility of an independent development studio. They also viewed the critical response to Deus Ex Go as an indication that the studio had thrice succeeded in its intention to translate an older console intellectual property to mobile with its own personality. Square Enix Montréal saw their work as the converging intersection between Square Enix's AAA tradition and reputable mobile games.

=== Free-to-play games, acquisition, and closure (2016–2022) ===
Square Enix Montréal was briefly rebranded as "Onoma" before its closure was announced a month later.

In the last 5 years from 2021, Square Enix Montréal turned its focus toward free-to-play games and began a "2.0" business phase. It grew its headcount from 40 to 170 by March 2021 and intended to expand further. In January 2018, Dief left Square Enix Montréal after the project he was working on was canceled. In June 2018, Naud stated that the studio had disconnected work on the Go series. He said that the series "was a great adventure for us as a studio", but that the premium mobile returns were disappointing, saying "it's sad to see that our games are only played by a small slither of the population because of the price point". The studio planned to continue to work in the mobile space, with Naud stating their intent to make "high-end, high-quality pristine mobile experiences" from either existing or new intellectual property.

The developer announced Hitman Sniper Assassins in March 2021 and an augmented reality adaptation of Space Invaders, licensed from Taito. In October 2021, Square Enix founded another mobile studio headed by Ed Perkins, Square Enix London Mobile, which later became part of Square Enix Montréal. Also directed by Naud, Square Enix London Mobile focused on publishing and external development, with franchise partnerships in the Tomb Raider and Avatar: The Last Airbender properties. In May 2022, Embracer Group announced an agreement to acquire several assets of Square Enix Europe, including Square Enix Montréal, for $300 million. At the time, the studio had 160 employees, of which 144 in Montreal and 16 in London. Anticipating a rebranding once detached from Square Enix, Square Enix Montréal established the "Rebrand Squad" to find a new name that was easy to pronounce in both English and French. After exploring 165 names, they chose "Onoma" (Greek for "name"), meant to reflect the studio's open possibilities. They trademarked "Studio Onoma" by August 2022. Embracer Group's acquisition was completed on August 26, 2022, with the assets being held under CDE Entertainment. Its rebrand to Onoma, serving "multiple products, programs, and initiatives", was publicized in October.

On November 1, 2022, Embracer Group and CDE Entertainment announced the impending closure of Onoma and CDE Entertainment's internal quality assurance team, affecting 200 employees. CDE Entertainment's director, Phil Rogers, cited growth opportunities with AAA games developed at its other studios, Eidos-Montréal and Crystal Dynamics. Onoma's staff were informed that some of them would be transferred to Eidos-Montréal. On November 23, the studio announced Deus Ex Go, Space Invaders: Hidden Heroes, Arena Battle Champions, and Hitman Sniper: The Shadows would be discontinued in January 2023.

== Games developed ==
Year	Title	Platform(s)
2014	Hitman Go	Android, iOS, Linux, PlayStation 4, PlayStation Vita, Windows, Windows Phone
2015	Hitman: Sniper	Android, iOS
2015	Lara Croft Go	Android, iOS, Linux, macOS, PlayStation 4, PlayStation Vita, Windows, Windows Phone
2016	Deus Ex Go	Android, iOS, Windows, Windows Phone
2021	Space Invaders: Hidden Heroes	Android, iOS
2022	Hitman Sniper: The Shadows	Android, iOS
2022	Arena Battle Champions	Android, iOS
