= Hitman: Sniper =

2015 video game

- Developer: Square Enix Montreal
- Publisher: Square Enix
- Series: Hitman
- Engine: Unity
- Platforms: Android, iOS
- Release: June 4, 2015
- Genre: Shooting gallery
- Mode: Single-player

Hitman: Sniper is a 2015 mobile shooting gallery video game in the Hitman series by Square Enix Montréal. As the series' mainstay protagonist Agent 47, the player looks through a first-person sniper scope vision on their touchscreen device to assassinate several powerful figures who have assembled at a lakeside compound without alerting their associates. The player uses the environment to find creative ways to kill these targets, sometimes prompted by secondary objectives. Through mission progression, the player unlocks more powerful weapons and new weapon abilities.

The game was announced at the 2014 Electronic Entertainment Expo as an extension of the Sniper Challenge promotional minigame from Square Enix's 2012 Hitman: Absolution. After a long Canadian soft launch, Square Enix released Hitman: Sniper for Android and iOS platforms on June 4, 2015, to generally favorable reviews. Some reviewers praised the cleverness and minimalism of its puzzle design, and others wanted more variety from its activity-dense scenarios. In free post-launch updates, Square Enix added a zombie defense game mode, new weapons, and a seasonal Halloween theme. A year after its release, Hitman: Sniper remained Square Enix Montréal's biggest revenue generator, and helped to fund the studio's Go series, for which it is better known.

== Gameplay ==
Screenshot of gameplay, in which the player views a target through a sniper sight and can choose whether to shoot the target or the glass banister supporting his weight

As Agent 47, the standard hitman protagonist of the Hitman series, the player is led to assassinate several powerful figures who have assembled at three upscale, lakefront houses in Montenegro.

This shooting gallery game is played through first-person vision of a sniper scope, such that Agent 47 is not vulnerable to counterattack but can fail the mission if the targets notice the scheme and leave the premises. The game becomes a puzzle of isolating targets such that others nearby will not be alerted and, in turn, alert others at the compound. The player experiments with alternative methods for killing the targets, such as shooting out glass and letting targets fall to their deaths rather than killing them directly. Other traps include setting off car alarms to distract guards, turning on fans to knock enemies off cliffs, and letting a target fall directly into a jacuzzi. The player pinches the device's touchscreen to zoom in with the rifle's scope and taps its reticle to fire. An on-screen "reload" button begins a quick time event in which the player swipes the screen to reload the weapon.

Missions are constructed around killing one of ten important targets and a secondary objective, such as a stylized kill within a time limit, using a specific kind of trap, or landing a headshot on a moving target.

As the game progresses, the player unlocks new weapons and weapon abilities as rewards from several activities: points accrued from successfully killing targets, leaderboard rankings, and "blueprint" collectibles dropped by targets. Added abilities include the option to slow time or reveal enemies on-screen. The player can also purchase the in-game currency directly through microtransactions to skip game progress and automatically unlock more powerful weapons. The player can sync progress between devices through Facebook integration.

== Development ==
Hitman: Sniper is an extension of the Sniper Challenge promotional minigame from Square Enix's 2012 Hitman: Absolution. The team also sought to explore the benefits of not having to move a character around an in-game world. The game originally designed as a "massive, premium game" for the iPad, with an above-average price point, before it transitioned to a free-to-play concept supported solely by player microtransactions. Though the latter remains in the final game, Square Enix ultimately chose to charge players for the final product, between the two concepts.

Square Enix announced Hitman: Sniper at the 2014 Electronic Entertainment Expo, where a demo was on display. The title was originally planned for release in 2014. After a long soft launch in Canada, Hitman: Sniper was released for iOS and Android platforms on June 4, 2015.

Like a free-to-play game, it continued to receive updates years after its release. A free post-launch update in June 2016 added a zombies mode—Death Valley Challenge Mode—wherein the player defends a human against encroaching zombies as he attempts to repair his car. The addition has three levels of difficulty and additional weapon upgrades and player achievements. Later that year, Square Enix Montréal added a Halloween theme and a limited-edition crossbow weapon with special abilities such as making a target's ghost into the player's ally.

== Reception ==
Reception

Aggregate score
Aggregator	Score
Metacritic	76/100

Review scores
Publication	Score
Gamezebo	5/5
Pocket Gamer	7/10
TouchArcade	4/5

The game received "generally favorable" reviews, according to video game review aggregator platform Metacritic. Gamezebo named the title among the best mobile games released in June 2015. Reviewers praised the cleverness and minimalism of its puzzle design, but wanted more variety from its activity-dense scenarios. They noted how they came to know the characters intimately after memorizing each character's routes and remembering how they respond to different kinds of coaxing. This predictability felt great, the TouchArcade reviewer wrote, when he could instinctively respond to new combinations of targets, but as a trade-off, the game mechanics quickly became repetitive. The Gamezebo reviewer felt otherwise, and commended how the game's setting, despite its consistency, remained fresh and exciting as new targets and complications were added. Pocket Gamer's reviewer found the game's alternative methods for killing targets through "traps and tricks" to be the game's most interesting element.

The Gamezebo reviewer had special praise for the game's sound design and how it was used to clue the player into puzzle solutions. TouchArcade commended how the game's sparse story unfolded by watching the assassination targets go about their time at the compound. The reviewer also noted that his suspension of disbelief was broken when characters would eventually return to partying after reacting to a gunshot, but suggested that the game's Easter eggs redeemed its psychopathic qualities. Pocket Gamer wrote that the game did not reach the heights of the series' situational humor in hiding bodies stealthily. Other criticism included Gamezebo, which blamed the game's core multiplier ability for breaking the balance of the game. TouchArcade thought that the game played better on the tablet iPad than on the smaller iPhone, and praised the feature that synced game progress, since Apple's iCloud service was known for its struggle to successfully implement the same feature. Despite Square Enix Montréal being best known for its Go series, Hitman: Sniper was the studio's biggest revenue generator. As its most lucrative title, the game helped to fund the development of the Go series.

== Sequel ==
A sequel also developed by Square Enix Montreal titled Hitman Sniper: The Shadows was released on March 3, 2022. It features new locations and multiple playable characters. It received positive reviews from Multiplayer.it and Pocket Tactics. The game shut down on January 4, 2023.
