= Hitman (franchise) =

Video game series

- Logo of the franchise since 2016; mainly used in the World of Assassination trilogy
- Genre: Stealth
- Developer: IO Interactive
- Publishers: IO Interactive (2021–present); Eidos Interactive (2000–2006); Square Enix (2012–2016, 2022); Warner Bros. Games (2018–2019); Feral Interactive (2023)
- Creator: Jacob Andersen
- Platforms: Microsoft Windows; macOS; iOS; Android; GameCube; Meta Quest 3; Nintendo Switch; Nintendo Switch 2; PlayStation 2; PlayStation 3; PlayStation 4; PlayStation 5; PlayStation Vita; PlayStation VR2; Xbox; Xbox 360; Xbox One; Xbox Series X and S
- First release: Hitman: Codename 47; 21 November 2000
- Latest release: Hitman 3; 20 January 2021

Hitman is a stealth game franchise created by the Danish developer IO Interactive. The player controls the contract killer Agent 47, who travels the world to assassinate various targets who are assigned to him.

The first game in the franchise, Hitman: Codename 47, was published by Eidos Interactive for Microsoft Windows in 2000 and introduced many of the gameplay elements that would become staples of the franchise. Eidos published the next three games, Hitman 2: Silent Assassin (2002), Hitman: Contracts (2004), and Hitman: Blood Money (2006), for Windows and consoles, each building upon Codename 47's foundation of stealth gameplay. After a six-year hiatus, Hitman: Absolution (2012) was published, and a high-definition port of the original three console games in 2013, both by Square Enix.

After another hiatus from the main series, the next game titled Hitman (2016) was released, also published by Square Enix. Hitman 2 (2018) was published by Warner Bros. Games, which later published HD ports of Hitman: Blood Money and Hitman: Absolution (2019). The most recent main series game, Hitman 3 (2021), was self-published by IO Interactive. In 2023, IO rebranded Hitman 3 as Hitman: World of Assassination, which imported all content of the previous two titles to the game. Feral Interactive published Hitman: Blood Money - Reprisal for mobile platforms and the Nintendo Switch the same year. IO Interactive released a Hitman: World of Assassination version for PlayStation VR2 on 27 March 2025 and an iOS port on 27 August 2025.

Mainline games in the Hitman series have been generally well-received, with most critics praising the take on stealth gameplay and freedom of approach. Outside of the eight mainline releases, the franchise includes three spin-off games, two novels, remastered and HD rereleases of games, and a comic book miniseries, and two film adaptations: Hitman (2007) and Hitman: Agent 47 (2015).

== Gameplay ==
Primarily from a third-person perspective and set in a sandbox environment, the core objective of Hitman is to kill an assigned target or targets. Certain levels will include auxiliary objectives, such as retrieving information or destroying a dangerous virus. The game allows the player different options to accomplish these tasks. Players can perform precise or indiscriminate assassinations; the games encourage players to implement a subtle approach to completing the levels, although this is not necessary.

== Development and history ==
Release timeline Main series in bold
2000	**Hitman: Codename 47**
2001
2002	**Hitman 2: Silent Assassin**
2003
2004	**Hitman: Contracts**
2005
2006	**Hitman: Blood Money**
2007	Hitman Trilogy
2008
2009
2010
2011
2012	**Hitman: Absolution**
2013	Hitman HD Trilogy
2014	Hitman Go
2015	Hitman: Sniper
2016	**Hitman**
2017
2018	**Hitman 2**
2019	Hitman HD Enhanced Collection
2020
2021	**Hitman 3**
2022	Hitman Sniper: The Shadows
2023	Hitman: Blood Money - Reprisal
2024
2025
2026
2027	Hitman Classic Trilogy Remastered

=== 1998–2000: Conception and first game ===
In 1998, following the dissolution of Danish game developer Zyrinx, its remaining team members regrouped to form Reto-Moto. This team later established IO Interactive (IO), which would go on to create its first intellectual property, the Hitman series. The inaugural game, Hitman: Codename 47, marked IO's debut in the gaming industry. Initially, the studio had planned to develop a straightforward shooter titled Rex-Domonius, but the concept was ultimately abandoned by Reto-Moto.

The creative vision for Hitman: Codename 47 was led by Danish designer Jacob Andersen, who drew inspiration from Hong Kong action films. Andersen explained, "We decided to do a quick game inspired by Hong Kong action movies... Basically, a guy in a suit blasting away in a Chinese restaurant." This initial idea evolved into the story of Agent 47, a genetically engineered clone assassin. The game introduced a unique gameplay mechanic where players could assume disguises from non-player characters, a feature that became a hallmark of the series and set Hitman apart from other games of its time. Additionally, Codename 47 was among the first games to incorporate ragdoll physics, which enhanced its realism and set a new standard for the industry.

Published by Eidos Interactive in 2000, Codename 47 was initially released exclusively for Windows. Andersen noted that the decision to focus on PC development was driven by the difficulty of obtaining console development kits at the time, as well as the growing availability of 3D hardware for PCs, which made the platform particularly appealing for innovation.

=== 2001–2010: Sequels and first hiatus ===
The first sequel in the series, Hitman 2: Silent Assassin, was developed by IO Interactive and published by Eidos Interactive for Microsoft Windows, PlayStation 2, and Xbox in October 2002, followed by a GameCube release in June 2003. Building upon the foundation of Codename 47, Silent Assassin placed greater emphasis on stealth mechanics and introduced new features, such as a first-person view mode, the ability to incapacitate enemies non-lethally, and missions that allowed for multiple approaches. Reflecting on the development, Jacob Andersen noted, "Now that the main platform was PS2, we felt more at home." However, some fans of the original game were dissatisfied with the introduction of a mid-level save system. While the controls were improved and efforts were made to address AI issues, non-player characters continued to exhibit unpredictable behavior. "Many have tried to fix the AI since, and all have failed," Andersen remarked with a smile. "It just has to have those odd moments—otherwise, it wouldn't be Hitman."

The next installment, Hitman: Contracts, was developed by IO and published by Eidos Interactive for Microsoft Windows, PlayStation 2, and Xbox in April 2004. The game served as both a sequel to Silent Assassin and a partial remake of Codename 47, featuring remastered levels from the first game with enhanced graphics, improved AI, and gameplay elements introduced in the second game. This decision was influenced by the fact that only 10% of Silent Assassin players had experienced Codename 47, largely due to the latter's Windows exclusivity. As Andersen explained, "We decided to make Hitman 2.5 with some of the best content from [Codename 47]."

Hitman: Blood Money, developed by IO and published by Eidos Interactive, was released for Microsoft Windows, PlayStation 2, Xbox, and Xbox 360 in May 2006. Developed concurrently with its predecessor, Blood Money continued the story from the previous installment and represented a significant leap forward in terms of graphics, AI, and level design, thanks to increased resources from both IO and Eidos. The game received generally positive reviews and is widely regarded as a cult classic. Blood Money has been re-released multiple times: first as part of an HD collection alongside its two predecessors in 2013, again in 2019 as part of another HD collection with its successor, and most recently for mobile devices in 2023 and the Nintendo Switch in 2024.

A box set titled Hitman Trilogy (released as Hitman: The Triple Hit Pack in Europe) was published by Eidos for the PlayStation 2 on June 19, 2007, in North America and June 22, 2007, in Europe. The collection includes Silent Assassin, Contracts, and Blood Money, with the games remaining identical to their original standalone releases.

Following the release of Blood Money, IO Interactive shifted its focus to developing new franchises, including the action-packed Kane & Lynch series (2007 and 2010) and the more family-friendly Mini Ninjas (2009).

=== 2011–2015: Absolution and second hiatus ===
Hitman: Absolution was developed by IO Interactive and published by Square Enix, following their acquisition of Eidos Interactive in 2009. It was released worldwide on 20 November 2012 for Microsoft Windows, OS X, PlayStation 3, and Xbox 360. The developers stated that Absolution, while retaining stealth elements, would move away from the sandbox levels of the first four games and incorporate more action-oriented features, such as a cinematic story-driven narrative and increased emphasis on gunplay, to appeal to a broader audience. A new mechanic called 'Instinct' was introduced, allowing players to track enemies through walls and highlight objects of interest, a feature that would become a staple of the franchise.

Upon release, Absolution received mixed reviews, with many longtime fans criticizing its departure from the classic Hitman formula. Despite selling over 4.5–5 million copies, the game failed to meet Square Enix's sales expectations. On 15 May 2014, Hitman: Absolution — Elite Edition was released for OS X by Feral Interactive, featuring all previously released downloadable content, including Hitman: Sniper Challenge, a "making of" documentary, and a 72-page artbook.

In January 2013, Square Enix released HD remastered versions of Silent Assassin, Contracts, and Blood Money for PlayStation 3 and Xbox 360 under the title Hitman HD Trilogy. The collection was released in North America on 29 January 2013, in Australia on 31 January 2013, and in Europe on 1 February 2013.

Hitman Go, a turn-based puzzle video game developed by Square Enix Montreal, was released for iOS on 17 April 2014 and for Android on 4 June 2014. A version for Microsoft Windows and Windows Phone was released on 27 April 2015. A "Definitive Edition" featuring improved visuals and additional content was released for PlayStation Vita, PlayStation 4, and PC via Steam on 23 February 2016.

Hitman: Sniper, a first-person shooter developed by Square Enix Montreal, was released for iOS and Android on 4 June 2015. Unlike traditional Hitman games, it focuses solely on sniping mechanics, with players taking on the role of Agent 47 to eliminate targets from a fixed position using a sniper rifle. The game lacks a narrative component and emphasizes precision and strategy.

=== 2015–present: World of Assassination trilogy, self-publication, and Freelancer ===
Following the underperformance of Absolution, IO Interactive reimagined the franchise, blending the gameplay elements introduced in Absolution with the open-ended design of earlier Hitman games. A soft reboot, simply titled Hitman, was announced at E3 2015 and published by Square Enix. The game's first level launched in March 2016 for Microsoft Windows, PlayStation 4, and Xbox One, receiving highly positive reviews. Structured episodically, Hitman featured six levels released monthly throughout 2016, alongside additional content such as "Elusive Targets", "Escalations", and user-created "Contracts". This episodic approach allowed IO to refine each level while creating a live game that expanded over time, laying the foundation for the series' future.

Despite critical acclaim, the game did not meet Square Enix's financial expectations. In 2017, Square Enix parted ways with IO Interactive, allowing the studio to retain full control of the Hitman IP and become independent. IO abandoned the episodic format for its next title, Hitman 2, which was announced in June 2018 and published by Warner Bros. Games. Released in November 2018 for Microsoft Windows, PlayStation 4, and Xbox One, the game featured six large sandbox levels, a multiplayer mode, and post-launch content. Players could also import levels from the 2016 game, retaining their progress if they already owned it.

In January 2019, Warner Bros. Games released the Hitman HD: Enhanced Collection for PlayStation 4 and Xbox One, featuring updated ports of Blood Money and Absolution with improved graphics, 4K resolution, and modernized controls.

Hitman 3 was revealed at the PlayStation 5 reveal event in 2020 and released in January 2021 for Microsoft Windows, PlayStation 4, PlayStation 5, Xbox One, Xbox Series X/S, Stadia, and Nintendo Switch (as a cloud version). Developed and self-published by IO Interactive, the game allowed players to carry over progress from the previous two titles and introduced VR support, extending to imported levels from earlier games. Hitman 3 was praised as the best entry in the series and became the most commercially successful Hitman game. IO supported it with extensive downloadable content and free updates, adding new features, game modes, and maps. In January 2023, IO merged Hitman and Hitman 2 into Hitman 3, renaming it Hitman: World of Assassination.

A digital-only collection of the World of Assassination trilogy, released on 20 January 2022, included Hitman 3 and access passes for content from Hitman and Hitman 2. A Premium Add-Ons bundle offered all DLC except for Hitman 3's "Seven Deadly Sins" expansion. The collection was available for PlayStation 4, PlayStation 5, Xbox Series X/S, Steam, and Epic Games.

Under license from IO, Hitman Sniper: The Shadows, a sequel to Hitman: Sniper, was developed by Square Enix Montreal and released for iOS and Android on 3 March 2022. The game retained the sniping mechanics of its predecessor but did not feature Agent 47 as a playable character. This marked the final Hitman game published by Square Enix before it sold most of its assets to Embracer Group, and the game was discontinued by January 2023.

On 26 January 2023, IO Interactive launched the "Freelancer" mode for Hitman 3. The mode follows Agent 47's life in a safehouse as he dismantles crime syndicates with Diana as his handler. Players choose targets and gear, balancing risk and reward, as failure results in losing equipment. The mode includes 100 mastery levels, unlocking new gear, outfits, and safehouse decorations.

On 27 March 2025, Hitman World of Assassination was released for PlayStation VR2 by IO Interactive. Five months later, on 27 August 2025, they released a version for iPhone and iPad. The release brought the entire trilogy to iOS devices. The iOS version features touch controls and support for external game controllers while not compromising gameplay.

=== Future ===
IO Interactive has confirmed that while Hitman 3 concludes the World of Assassination trilogy, it will not be the final game in the franchise.

During December 2025, in an interview conducted by Variety, IOI CEO Hakan Abrak confirmed that once IOI have shared additional information about the new co-op mode, that is being introduced to the World of Assassination trilogy, they will then begin sharing new information around the next Hitman game.

At the IO Interactive Showcase, the company announced the Hitman Classic Trilogy Remastered collection for PC, PlayStation 5, and Xbox Series consoles developed by Saber Interactive. The collection consists of the first three games Hitman: Codename 47, Hitman 2: Silent Assassin, and Hitman: Contracts. The remaster includes enhanced visuals and a photo mode. It is scheduled for a 2027 release.

== Reception ==
Aggregate review scores
Game	Metacritic
Hitman: Codename 47	(PC) 73
Hitman 2: Silent Assassin	(GC) 83 (PC) 87 (PS2) 85 (Xbox) 84
Hitman: Contracts	(PC) 74 (PS2) 80 (Xbox) 78
Hitman: Blood Money	(PC) 82 (PS2) 83 (Xbox) 81 (X360) 82
Hitman: Absolution	(PC) 79 (PS3) 83 (X360) 79
Hitman	(PC) 83 (PS4) 84 (XONE) 85
Hitman 2	(PC) 82 (PS4) 82 (XONE) 84
Hitman 3	(PC) 87 (PS5) 84 (XSX) 87

The main games in the Hitman franchise have received generally positive reviews for their level design and gameplay elements. In particular the level of freedom offered to players and the unique approach to stealth gameplay. The series has received multiple awards and nominations, including several Game of the Year awards. It has been commercially successful, selling over 15 million copies worldwide as of 2015. The World of Assassination trilogy reached over 50 million players as of November 2021.

=== Original series ===
Hitman: Codename 47 received "mixed or average" reviews, according to review aggregator Metacritic. Jim Preston reviewed the PC version of the game for Next Generation, rating it three stars out of five, and calling it "A deeply flawed masterpiece that will, nonetheless, reward forgiving gamers." Codename 47 received a "Silver" sales award from the Entertainment and Leisure Software Publishers Association (ELSPA), indicating sales of at least 100,000 copies in the United Kingdom. In April 2009, Square Enix revealed that Codename 47 had surpassed half a million sales globally. The game sold over 500,000 copies and received mixed reviews due to its controls and difficulty.

Silent Assassin received generally positive reviews from critics, who considered it to be an improvement over its predecessor in every aspect. The game was also a commercial success, having sold more than 3.7 million copies as of 23 April 2009, which makes it the best-selling Hitman game in the original series.

Contracts was met with generally positive reviews; praise was directed at the improved gameplay elements, graphics, soundtrack, darker tone and atmosphere, while criticism was reserved for the lack of significant improvements and the familiarity with the previous two games. As of April 2009, the game has sold around 2 million copies.

Blood Money was a critical and commercial success, selling more than 2.1 million copies. It has gained a cult following and is considered by many publications and critics as one of the greatest video games ever made.

Absolution polarised reviewers and players. The game's graphics, environments, locations, and varied gameplay options were widely praised. However, many critics and many long time fans of the series disliked the game for its linear structure, as opposed to the open ended nature of previous installments. As of March 2013, the game had sold over 3.6 million copies, failing to reach predicted sales targets.

=== World of Assassination trilogy ===
2016's Hitman received positive reviews; critics praised the game's episodic release format, locations, level design, and its replayability but criticized the always-online requirement and excessive handholding. The game under-performed commercially and caused publisher Square Enix to divest from IO Interactive in May 2017. Despite the slow start, IO Interactive announced the game had attracted seven million players as of November 2017 and more than 13 million players had played the game by May 2018. Hitman was nominated for Best Action/Adventure Game at The Game Awards 2016 and Evolving Game at the 13th British Academy Games Awards. Video game publication Giant Bomb named Hitman their Game of the Year in 2016.

Hitman 2 was met with generally positive reviews, with most critics considering it to be an improvement over its predecessor. It debuted at tenth place in the UK's all-format sales charts. In Japan, the PlayStation 4 version sold 10,162 copies within its debut week, which made it the fifth best-selling retail game of the week in the country. The game was nominated for "Control Design, 3D" and "Game, Franchise Adventure" at the National Academy of Video Game Trade Reviewers Awards.

Hitman 3 received generally favorable reviews, with most critics regarding it as the best entry in the World of Assassination trilogy, and some even calling it the best Hitman game to date. The game was nominated for multiple year-end awards, and won several of them, including "PC Game of the Year" at the 2021 Golden Joystick Awards. Hitman 3 was also the most commercially successful of the franchise, selling 300% better than Hitman 2 and making back its development costs in only a week.

=== Collections ===
Aggregate review scores
Game	GameRankings	Metacritic
Hitman Trilogy	PS2: 88%	-
Hitman HD Enhanced Collection	PS4: 75% XONE: 73%	PS4: 69/100; XONE: 66/100

Hitman Trilogy is a boxset that was released in 2007 for PlayStation 2. It includes Hitman 2: Silent Assassin, Hitman: Contracts, and Hitman: Blood Money. Just like the original releases of the games, the bundle was received positively.

Hitman HD Enhanced Collection was released for PlayStation 4 and Xbox One. It includes a port of Hitman: Blood Money and an HD remaster of Hitman: Absolution. Both games were released on 4K with 60fps, has texture and lighting improvements, and introduces updated controls for a "...more fluid experience". It received a mixed review as noted by PlayStation Country, who gave the score a 7/10: "As a remaster, Hitman HD Enhanced Collection does deliver the best looking edition of these games to consoles. If either of these titles are missing from your Hitman collection, it's worth a look".

=== Spin-offs ===
Aggregate review scores
Game	Metacritic
Hitman Go	(iOS) 81 (PC) 72 (PS4) 77 (Vita) 80
Hitman: Sniper	(iOS) 76

Following its announcement, Hitman Go was met with some skepticism from critics. However, the game received a positive reception with praise for the art, aesthetics, simple gameplay mechanics, and translation of Hitman to a mobile device. It received several nominations and awards from gaming publications and award organizations.

Hitman: Sniper was met with generally favorable reviews. Some reviewers praised the cleverness and minimalism of its puzzle design, but wanted more variety from its activity-dense scenarios.

== Other media ==
=== Films ===
A film adaptation of the game series was released in 2007. The film, titled Hitman, is set in a separate continuity from the game series, directed by Xavier Gens and starring Timothy Olyphant as Agent 47. Executive producer Vin Diesel was originally cast to play Agent 47 but was replaced for unknown reasons. The film also stars Dougray Scott, Robert Knepper, Ulrich Thomsen and Michael Offei. In the film, the International Contract Agency is replaced by a similar group called the Organization, which, like the ICA, benefits from ties to various government agencies, is neutral in global matters and morality, and performs missions all over the world. Unlike the game wherein the hitmen are contracted from a range of backgrounds, the Organization instead recruits orphans and trains them from an early age.

A sequel was planned but Olyphant stated on the Nerdist podcast that he had no interest in returning for a sequel and only did the original film in order to pay for his new house following the sudden cancellation of Deadwood.

On 5 February 2013, it was reported that the film series was being rebooted with the title Hitman: Agent 47, directed by Aleksander Bach. Screenwriter of the original film, Skip Woods, wrote the screenplay with Mike Finch and starring Rupert Friend as 47 after Paul Walker, who was originally cast, was killed in a car crash on 30 November 2013. The film also stars Zachary Quinto, Hannah Ware, Thomas Kretschmann, Dan Bakkedahl and Ciarán Hinds.

In 2015, Hitman film producer Adrian Askarieh stated that he hoped to oversee a film universe with Just Cause, Hitman, Tomb Raider, Deus Ex, and Thief, but admitted that he does not have the rights to Tomb Raider. In May 2017, the Game Central reporters at Metro UK suggested that the shared universe was unlikely, pointing out that no progress had been made on any Just Cause, Deus Ex nor Thief films.

=== Television series ===
In November 2017, Hulu and Fox 21 Television Studios announced it would produce a television series based on the game. Derek Kolstad, Adrian Askarieh and Chuck Gordon would serve as its executive producers. The pilot episode would be written by Kolstad. Kolstad has stated that his adaption of Agent 47 will differ slightly from that of the vision IO has already made.

Despite being announced in 2017, the project was officially scrapped in March 2026.

=== Literature ===
William C. Dietz wrote the first novel in the Hitman book series, titled Hitman: Enemy Within. It was released on August 28, 2007, and published by Del Rey Books. Set between the events of Hitman 2: Silent Assassin and Hitman: Blood Money, the novel centers around Puissance Treize, an organisation rival to ICA.

The second novel in the Hitman book series, Hitman: Damnation, was written by Raymond Benson and was published on October 30, 2012. It serves as a tie-in and prequel to Hitman: Absolution.

IO Interactive partnered with Dynamite Entertainment to create Agent 47: Birth of the Hitman, a six-issue comic book miniseries that ran from November 2017 to June 2018, and was later released as a graphic novel in 2019. The comics are a tie-in to the World of Assassination trilogy and depicts 47's life before the events of the games, including his upbringing at Dr. Ort-Meyer's asylum and his previous career as a brainwashed assassin for Providence alongside his best friend, Lucas Grey / Subject 6. IO Interactive had complete control over the storyline of the comic.
