= Thief II =

2000 video game

Thief II: The Metal Age
- North American cover art
- Developer: Looking Glass Studios
- Publisher: Eidos Interactive
- Director: Steve Pearsall
- Designers: Tim Stellmach; Randy Smith
- Programmers: Alex Duran; William Farquhar; Pat McElhatton
- Artist: Mark Lizotte
- Composer: Eric Brosius
- Series: Thief
- Engine: Dark Engine
- Platform: Windows
- Release: NA: March 23, 2000; EU: March 31, 2000
- Genre: Stealth
- Mode: Single-player

Thief II: The Metal Age is a 2000 stealth video game developed by Looking Glass Studios and published by Eidos Interactive in March 2000. Like its predecessor Thief: The Dark Project, the game follows Garrett, a master thief who works in and around a steampunk metropolis called the City. The player assumes the role of Garrett as he unravels a conspiracy related to a new religious sect. Garrett takes on missions such as burglaries and frameups, while trying to avoid detection by guards and automated security.

Thief II was designed to build on the foundation of its predecessor. In response to feedback from players of Thief, the team placed a heavy focus on urban stealth in the sequel, and they minimized the use of monsters and maze-like levels. The game was made with the third iteration of the Dark Engine, which had been used previously to develop Thief and System Shock 2. Thief II was announced at the 1999 Electronic Entertainment Expo, as part of an extended contract between Looking Glass and Eidos to release games in the Thief series. Looking Glass neared bankruptcy as the game was developed, and the company was kept running by advances from Eidos.

Thief II received positive reviews from critics, and its initial sales were stronger than those of its predecessor. However, the game's royalties were processed slowly, which compounded Looking Glass's financial troubles. As a result, the company closed in May 2000, with plans for Thief III cancelled. The third game in the series, entitled Thief: Deadly Shadows, was developed by Ion Storm and published by Eidos in 2004. Thief 2X: Shadows of the Metal Age, a widely praised expansion mod for Thief II, was released in 2005. In 2014, Square Enix published a reboot of the series, developed by Eidos-Montréal.

== Gameplay ==
The player holds the blackjack and hides in a shadow from a patrolling guard. The light monitor in the bottom-center of the screen is completely dark, indicating that the player character is not visible to the enemy.

Thief II is a stealth game that takes place from a first-person perspective in a three-dimensional (3D) graphical environment. The player seeks to complete mission objectives and to evade the notice of opponents such as guards. The player must minimize the visibility and audibility of the player character, Garrett, to escape detection. Players try to avoid lit areas and loud flooring in favor of shadows and quiet flooring. A light monitor on the heads-up display (HUD) indicates the player character's visibility. While it is possible for the player character to engage in direct combat, he is easily defeated.

The game's 15 missions take place in large levels that can be confronted in multiple ways. Guards may be knocked out with a blackjack or killed with a bow or sword, and their fallen bodies may be picked up and hidden. In addition to human enemies, the game features security automatons and surveillance cameras. While completing objectives such as frameups and blackmail, the player steals valuables that may be used to purchase thieving gear between missions. The player's main tools are specialized arrows, including water arrows to douse lights, moss arrows to dampen the player character's footsteps and rope arrows to reach higher ground.

Thief II is designed to be played methodically, and the player plans ahead by scouting, reading the game's map and observing patrol patterns. The player character has a zooming mechanical eye, which connects to throwable "Scouting Orb" cameras. One Scouting Orb may be deployed at a time; when it lands, the player views the game world from its perspective until normal play is resumed. The player can listen for noises, such as footsteps and humming, to determine the locations of enemies. On the highest of the game's three difficulty levels, killing humans results in a game over, and in certain missions the player must not knock out any guards.

== Plot ==
=== Setting and characters ===
Like its predecessor Thief: The Dark Project, Thief II is set in a steampunk metropolis called the City, whose appearance resembles that of both medieval and Victorian era cities. Magic and steam technology exist side by side, and three factions—the manipulative and enigmatic Keepers, the technology-focused Hammerites and the "pagan" worshippers of the Pan-like Trickster god—are in operation. Thief II takes place one year after the first game. In the aftermath of the Trickster's defeat and the failure of his plan to revert the world to a wild, primitive state, a schism in the Hammerite religion spawns the "Mechanist" sect, which fanatically values technological progress. The new inventions of the Mechanists are used by a resurgent police force to crack down on crime. The pagans are in disarray, and have been driven into the wilderness beyond the City. From there, they engage in guerrilla warfare against the Mechanists. The Keeper faction is dormant as the game begins.

The game continues the story of Garrett (voiced by Stephen Russell), the cynical master thief who defeated the Trickster. Pursuing Garrett is the new sheriff, Gorman Truart (voiced by Sam Babbitt), who has imposed a zero tolerance policy on crime. Viktoria (voiced by Terri Brosius), the former ally of the Trickster, eventually joins with Garrett to combat the Mechanists. The game's primary antagonist is the founder of the Mechanists, Father Karras (also voiced by Russell), a mentally unstable inventor who despises the natural world.

=== Story ===
The game begins as Garrett continues his life as a thief. However, he is betrayed by his fence and ambushed after an early mission, and he determines that Truart, the local sheriff, is hunting him. Keepers take Garrett to hear a prophecy about the "Metal Age", which he ignores. As Garrett leaves, Artemus, the Keeper who brought him into the order, informs him that Truart had been hired to kill him, and he gives Garrett a letter that directs him to eavesdrop on a Mechanist meeting. There, Garrett overhears Truart and Father Karras discussing the conversion of street people into mindless "Servants", who wear masks that emit a red vapor capable of reducing themselves and any nearby organic material to rust. Truart promises to provide Karras with twenty victims for the Servant project, not realizing that Karras is recording his words for use in blackmail. Garrett steals the recording from a safe deposit box, in order to coerce Truart into revealing his employer.

However, when Garrett sneaks into Truart's estate to confront him, he finds Truart has been murdered. Evidence at the crime scene leads him to spy on the police officer Lt. Mosley. Garrett sees Mosley deliver a suspicious letter, which is carried through a portal by a wounded pagan. Garrett enters the portal and finds himself outside the City, and he follows the pagan's trail of blood to Viktoria, who persuades Garrett to join her against the Mechanists. On a lead from Viktoria, he infiltrates Karras' office to learn about the "Cetus Project", and inadvertently discovers that Karras is giving Servants to the City's nobles. Garrett travels to a Mechanist base to find out more about the Cetus Project, which is revealed to be a submarine. In order to locate and kidnap a high-ranking Mechanist named Brother Cavador, Garrett stows away in the vehicle.

After delivering Cavador to Viktoria, Garrett steals a Servant mask to learn about a Mechanist technology called a "Cultivator". Meanwhile, Karras hides inside the Mechanist cathedral in preparation for his plan. Garrett and Viktoria learn that it is the Cultivators inside Servant masks which emit red vapor, or "rust gas". Karras had provided Servants to nobles with gardens in order to set off an apocalyptic chain reaction. Viktoria plans to lure the Servants into the hermetically sealed Mechanist cathedral before Karras activates their masks, but Garrett believes this to be too dangerous and leaves. Viktoria goes to the cathedral alone and dies while filling it with plants, and Garrett completes her plan, killing Karras in the rust gas. Afterward, Garrett is approached by Artemus, who explains that Karras' scheme and Viktoria's death had been prophesied. Garrett demands to know the rest of the Keepers' prophecies as the game ends.

== Development ==
=== Early production ===
Looking Glass Studios began designing Thief II in January 1999. The team's goal was to build on the foundation of Thief: The Dark Project, a game that Thief II project director Steve Pearsall later said was an experiment. He explained that the team had played it safe by including certain "exploration ... or adventure oriented" missions with "jumping and climbing puzzles" in Thief, and that the new game was significantly more focused on stealth. Combat was given less prominence than in the original. Based on feedback from players and reviewers of Thief, the team decided to scale back the use of maze-like levels and monsters such as zombies in favor of urban environments and human enemies. Pearsall stated that Thief's monsters were negatively received because, unlike the game's human enemies, they did not clearly indicate when they noticed the player. The team sought to remedy this problem by improving the audio cues given by non-human enemies in the sequel.

Production of Thief II commenced in February. Looking Glass chose to compose the game's team of "half the original designers and half new blood", according to executive producer James Poole. The company tried to select people who meshed well both personally and creatively, in an attempt to guarantee a smooth development cycle. Adrenaline Vault editor-in-chief Emil Pagliarulo was hired as a junior designer, in part because of his positive review of Thief. Rich "zdim" Carlson and Iikka Keränen joined from Ion Storm's Daikatana team, and Looking Glass contractor Terri Brosius was hired as a full-time designer. One-third of the team was female, which Pearsall believed contributed to a strong group dynamic. As was typical at Looking Glass, the Thief II team worked in a wall-less space called a "pit", which allowed them to converse easily. Describing the work environment at the time, writer Laura Baldwin noted that "conversations dash madly about the room, [and] when someone is demonstrating something interesting everyone gravitates over to look."

During the first months of development, the team regularly gathered to watch films pertinent to Garrett's character and to the game's visual design, such as The Third Man, The Castle of Cagliostro, M and Metropolis. Pearsall said that the latter two films were Thief II's "biggest aesthetic influences", while the main inspiration for its plot was Umberto Eco's novel The Name of the Rose. The team also drew influence from Fritz Leiber's Fafhrd and the Gray Mouser. The game's story was written in the three-act structure: Garrett was intended to transition from his "cynical self" in the first act to a private investigator in the second, and to a character similar to James Bond in the third. The City's technology and architecture were influenced by the appearance of Victorian London, and certain areas were given an Art Deco theme to provide "sort of a 'Batman' feel", in reference to the 1989 film. Lead artist Mark Lizotte captured over two-thousand photographs during his vacation in Europe, and these were the basis for many of the game's textures.

Thief II was built with the third iteration of the Dark Engine, which had been used previously for Thief and System Shock 2. According to Pearsall, the Dark Engine had become "a very well understood development environment", which made for an easier production process. Engine updates created for System Shock 2, such as support for 16-bit color, were carried over to Thief II. The average character model in Thief II was given close to double the polygons of the average model in Thief, with much of the added detail focused on characters' heads. This was an attempt to give the characters a "more organic" look. Certain artificial intelligence (AI) routines written into the Dark Engine, which allowed enemies to notice changes in the environment such as open doors, had not been used in Thief or in System Shock 2 but were implemented in Thief II. Weather effects such as fog and rain were added, and technology from Flight Unlimited III was used to generate the sky and clouds.

=== Announcement and continued development ===
Thief II was announced during the Electronic Entertainment Expo on May 13, 1999, as part of a contract between Looking Glass and Eidos Interactive to release four new games in the Thief series, beginning with Thief Gold. The deal had been signed on May 7, roughly three months after Thief II entered production. A tech demo of the game, which Bruce Geryk of Games Domain described as "about three rooms with some Mages", was displayed on the show floor. The demo was used to showcase the updated Dark Engine, which featured support for colored lighting, higher polygon models and larger environments. The team revealed their intention to include more levels with human enemies, and announced a projected release date of spring 2000. Plans to include a cooperative multiplayer mode were also detailed at the show. IGN's Jason Bates noted that the Thief II display attracted "a bit of a buzz and a small crowd of dedicated onlookers".

By July, the team had begun initial construction of the game's levels. Thief II's increased focus on stealth necessitated new level design concepts: the most stealth-based missions in Thief had centered on urban burglary, but Pearsall explained that this "would get tired pretty fast" if repeated in every level. The team diversified Thief II by designing missions with such objectives as kidnapping, blackmail and eavesdropping. The first two levels were designed to seamlessly introduce new players to the core game mechanics, without a tutorial mission that might lose the interest of experienced players. When creating a mission, the team would often begin by deciding on the player's objective, after which they would produce a rough level design. The mission would then undergo a peer review to determine if it should be added to the game. Each of the game's levels was a team effort rather than the work of a single designer. Designer Randy Smith explained that, while Thief's levels had been designed to fit a pre-existing story, the Thief II team "tried to think of really good missions first" and then adjusted the plot to suit them. He noted that it was highly difficult to harmonize the two.

The game's sound team was composed of Kemal Amarasingham, Ramin Djawadi and audio director Eric Brosius. According to Brosius, each member of the audio department did "everything", without clear demarcations between roles. Like Thief, Thief II features a sound engine that simulates propagation in real-time. To achieve this effect, each level's geometry was input both to the level editor and to a "separate [sound] database", which mapped how sound would realistically propagate based on "the physical room characteristics [... and] how all the different rooms and areas are connected together". For example, noise travels freely through an open door but is blocked when the door is closed. The team used the new "occlusion" feature in EAX 2.0 to make Thief II's sound environment more realistic and to allow the player to listen through doors. The game features more sound effects, music and speech than the original Thief. Thief II's score, as with that of its predecessor, was designed to "blur ambient [sound] and music" together. However, Brosius later stated that, while Thief's soundtrack is composed of "simple and hypnotic" loops only a few seconds in length, Thief II features longer and "more thoughtfully" constructed pieces. He believed that this method had positive aspects, but that it resulted in a less immersive audio environment.

Artist Dan Thron returned to create the game's cutscenes, with assistance from Jennifer Hrabota-Lesser. Thron later called Hrabota-Lesser "one of the greatest artists I've ever seen". The cutscenes, which Computer Games Magazine called "unique", feature multiple layers of artwork and footage of live actors filmed against a green screen. These components were combined and animated in Adobe After Effects. The technique had been developed for the original Thief, as an evolution of designer Ken Levine's suggestion to use motion comic cutscenes. David Lynch's films Eraserhead and The Elephant Man were important influences on their style.

=== Final months ===
By October 1999, the team had cut the game's multiplayer feature. Pearsall explained that Looking Glass did not "have the resources to do a new kind of multiplayer and ship a finely tuned single-player game". Plans were announced in January 2000 to release a multiplayer-only Thief game shortly after the completion of Thief II. As Thief II's development continued, Looking Glass experienced extreme financial troubles. The company's Marc LeBlanc later said that "Eidos was writing a check every week to cover our burn rate" during the last months of the project. The game's final cost was roughly $2.5 million. According to company head Paul Neurath, Eidos informed Looking Glass that "it was not an option" for Thief II to miss its release date, and that there would be "dire consequences if [we] missed by even a day". An anonymous Looking Glass staffer later told Salon.com that Eidos "told us basically to ship [Thief II] by their fiscal quarter or die".

By January, Pearsall confirmed that the game had reached beta, and that most of the team's energy was being spent "tuning, polishing, and fixing bugs". He noted in early February that Thief II had been produced almost entirely on schedule. The company slipped behind near the end of the project and entered crunch time to make up the loss. On February 24, Thief II producer Michael McHale announced that the game had reached "feature freeze", and that the team was in "super crunch mode". Numerous game testers from Eidos joined the project. However, McHale said that the team was energized and that "spirits [were] high". Certain employees slept in the office and avoided bathing so that the game could reach its March deadline. LeBlanc later stated his belief that the game was rushed, and that its quality suffered as a result. Nevertheless, the team met their goal, and the game was released on March 23, 2000 in North America, and on March 31, 2000 in Europe. Eidos expedited the company's payment for completing the game.

== Reception ==
Reception

Aggregate score
Aggregator	Score
Metacritic	87/100

Review scores
Publication	Score
Computer Games Magazine	4.5/5
Computer Gaming World	4.5/5
GameFan	95 out of 100
GamePro	4 out of 5
Next Generation	4/5
PC Gamer (US)	89%
PC Zone	82%

Thief 2 debuted high on the bestsellers list for computer games, and its initial sales were better than those of its commercially successful predecessor. By November 2000, its global sales had surpassed 220,000 copies; PC Zone described these figures as "commercial acclaim". The United States alone accounted for 67,084 sales by the end of 2000, which drew in revenues of $2.37 million. The game later received a "Silver" sales award by the Entertainment and Leisure Software Publishers Association (ELSPA), indicating sales of at least 100,000 copies in the United Kingdom. Thief II also received positive reviews from critics, with an aggregate score of 87/100 on Metacritic.

Computer Gaming World's Thomas L. McDonald wrote that "everything in Thief II is bigger, sharper, better, and more effective" than in its predecessor. He enjoyed its story and called its levels "vast and intricate", with "astonishingly complex and often beautiful" architecture; but he found the game's graphics to be somewhat lackluster. McDonald summarized Thief II as a unique "gamer's game". Jim Preston of PC Gamer US considered the game to be "more focused and polished than the original" and praised the removal of "zombie battles". While he faulted its graphics, he summarized it as "one hell of a good game".

Jasen Torres of GameFan wrote: "If you liked Thief, you'll love Thief 2: The Metal Age; it's more of the stuff that made Thief great, with less of the annoying stuff". He applauded the removal of "zombie killer" missions and believed the game's sound to be "superior to any other game". He considered its story to be "good" but "nothing great" and its graphics to be "decent"; but he commented that the game was "really all about the gameplay", which he praised as "quite compelling and fun". Benjamin E. Sones of Computer Games Magazine considered the game's story to be "quite good", but he faulted Looking Glass for failing to detail the events of the first game for new players. He wrote that Thief II's graphics were passable but that its sound design was "phenomenal". Sones praised its missions as "very well crafted" and noted that they gave the impression of being in "a living, breathing world". He summarized: "It may not be perfect, but Thief 2 has got it where it counts".

Charles Harold of The New York Times called the game a "refreshing alternative to games that glorify violence". He found its story to be "slight", but he lauded its world as "amazingly alive" and its AI as a "remarkable impersonation of real intelligence". Writing for GamePro, Barry Brenesal commented that Thief II "provides a solid gaming experience" but "doesn't startle like its predecessor". He wrote that its missions featured a "great deal of variety" and praised their "ability to casually suggest a much larger world", but complained that they were linear. He considered the game's writing to be "among the best in the business". While Brenesal enjoyed the game's textures and lighting, he noted the low detail of the game's human models, whose animations he found to be "arthritic". PC Zone's Paul Presley wrote that the game's levels were larger but easier than those of Thief, and he considered their objectives to be somewhat linear. He found Thief II's graphics to be dated and wrote that its lack of real-time lighting "tends to give each environment a sort of 'false' quality". However, he believed that the game "still has enough atmosphere to immerse you" and praised its sound design. Presley considered the game to be a straightforward rehash of its predecessor and finished: "A more clear-cut case of sequel-itis there has never been."

Jim Preston reviewed the PC version of the game for Next Generation, rating it four stars out of five, and stated that "Great, skulking gameplay, useful new tools, and clever level design make Thief II an excellent first-person 'sneaker'."

== Post-release ==
While Thief II performed well commercially, Looking Glass was not set to receive royalties for several months. The company had struggled financially since the commercial failures of its self-published games Terra Nova: Strike Force Centauri and British Open Championship Golf. Looking Glass's Flight Unlimited III had flopped at retail, and the development of Jane's Attack Squadron had gone over budget and fallen behind schedule. A deal to co-develop the stealth game Deep Cover with Irrational Games had recently collapsed. According to Looking Glass's Tim Stellmach, the delay in Thief II royalties "faced [us] with the prospect of running out of money." Looking Glass management signed a deal in which Eidos Interactive would acquire the company, but Eidos fell into a sudden financial crisis, in part because of the failure of Ion Storm's $40 million game Daikatana. These factors led to the closure of Looking Glass on May 24, 2000, with the planned Thief II successors Thief II Gold and Thief III cancelled.

=== Later installments ===
The Thief series had been planned as a trilogy, and work on Thief III was "in a fairly advanced stage" when Looking Glass closed, according to PC Zone's Keith Pullin. Randy Smith and Terri Brosius were appointed as lead designers, and they developed the game's concept over several months. In an open letter published after the company's bankruptcy, Smith wrote that the third game would have taken place in an "open-ended, self-directed city", and that its plot would have centered on the Keepers. Brosius suggested that Thief III would have seen Garrett "accept[ing] that there are consequences to his actions", and that he would likely have become "ready to give, rather than always take." The player would have uncovered the game's story gradually, while exploring a free-roam environment. Serious plans had been made to include co-operative multiplayer, and a new engine, Siege, had been in production. When Looking Glass closed, its assets were liquidated and the Thief intellectual property was sold at auction. This raised doubts that the Thief trilogy would be completed, a situation that Salon.com writer Wagner James Au compared to Lucasfilm closing after the release of The Empire Strikes Back. However, following rumors, Eidos announced on August 9, 2000 that it had purchased the rights to Thief.

Development of Thief III was delegated to the Warren Spector-supervised Ion Storm, which had recently completed Deus Ex. According to Spector, Thief III would have been given to Core Design or Crystal Dynamics had he not accepted it. The game was announced for Windows and the PlayStation 2. On August 10, Spector commented that Ion Storm's first goal was to assemble a core team, composed in part of former Looking Glass employees, to design and plot the game. Thief II team members Randy Smith, Lulu Lamer, Emil Pagliarulo and Terri Brosius were hired to begin the project. On August 16, Ion Storm announced its hires, and stated that concept work on Thief III would begin in September. The team planned to "wrap up [the] loose ends" of the series, and they built directly upon the Thief III concept work done at Looking Glass. Thief III was eventually renamed Thief: Deadly Shadows, and it was released for Windows and the Xbox on May 25, 2004.

In May 2009, after several months of rumors, a fourth game in the Thief series was announced by Deus Ex: Human Revolution developer Eidos-Montréal. It was unveiled in the April 2013 issue of Game Informer. The game, entitled Thief, is a reboot of the Thief series; and it does not feature the Hammerites, pagans or Keepers. Its plot follows Garrett (voiced by Romano Orzari in place of Stephen Russell) in the aftermath of an accident that leaves his protégé, Erin, missing. Garrett has amnesia after this incident, and the City is beset by a plague called the Gloom. The game was released for Windows and the Xbox 360, PlayStation 3, Xbox One and PlayStation 4 in February 2014.

=== Fan expansion ===
Soon after the bankruptcy of Looking Glass, a fan group called the Dark Engineering Guild began developing an expansion mod to Thief II, entitled Thief 2X: Shadows of the Metal Age. Initially, they hoped to fill the void left by the cancellation of Thief III, but they continued to work on the mod after the announcement and release of Thief: Deadly Shadows. Released in 2005 after five years in development, the mod follows Zaya, a young woman who is robbed while visiting the City and who then seeks revenge. She is mentored by a pagan hermit named Malak, who trains her as a thief but who has ulterior motives. The team designed Zaya to be physically capable and to have a "middle-eastern/north-African look", but made an effort to avoid similarities to Mulan. Chronologically, the story starts near the end of Thief and ends in the middle of Thief II, thereby depicting the rise of Gorman Truart and the early days of the Mechanists. Thief 2X features 13 missions, with new animated cutscenes and roughly 3,000 new lines of recorded dialogue.

The mod was praised by critics and by the Thief fan community. Brett Todd of PC Gamer US awarded it "Mod of the Month" and wrote: "It doesn't quite have the mysterious allure of the original games, but it's awfully close". A writer for Jolt Online Gaming praised the mod's visuals and considered its missions to be "incredibly well designed". While the writer commented that Thief 2X did not perfectly follow the series' tone and that its voice acting was "not the best", they finished by saying that fans of the Thief series had "no excuse not to play T2X". PC Gamer UK's Kieron Gillen wrote that he had expected the mod to be cancelled, given that the "web is full of [...] five-percent finished masterworks from people who aimed far, far too high". After Thief 2X's release, he lauded it as the best Thief fan work and as "one of the most impressive achievements of any fan community for any game".

== See also ==
- The Dark Mod
- Emergent gameplay
- Immersive sim
