= The Institute =

The Institute may refer to:

- The Institute (video game), a 1983 graphic adventure game
- The Institute (2012 film), a documentary film about an alternate reality game called "The Jejune Institute" set in San Francisco
- The Institute (2017 film), a horror-thriller film directed by James Franco
- The Institute (2022 film), a thriller film starring Ignacyo Matynia
- The Institute (King novel), a 2019 novel by Stephen King
  - The Institute (TV series), a 2025 television series adapted from Stephen King's novel
- The Institute (Cain novel), a 1976 novel by James M. Cain
- The Institute (album), by King Diamond
- The Mossad (lit. "institute"), the foreign intelligence agency of Israel.
- The Institute, a secretive organization in Fallout 4
- Georgia Institute of Technology, also called "The Institute"

== See also ==
- Institute (disambiguation)
- Institution (disambiguation)
