= Stephen Russell =

American actor

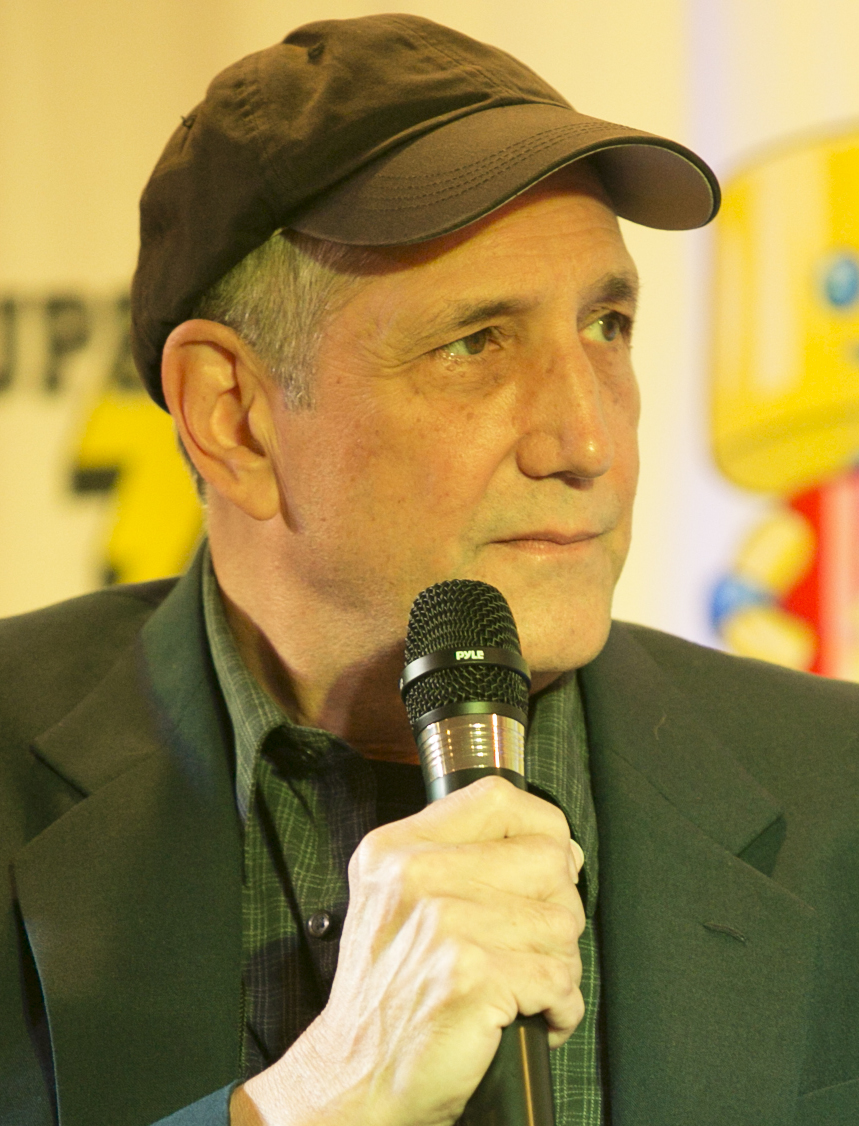
- Russell in October 2017
- Occupations: Actor; playwright; theater director
- Children: 2

Stephen L. Russell is an American actor, playwright, and theater director. He is best known for his video game voice roles as Garrett in the Thief series, Corvo Attano in Dishonored 2, and various characters in Skyrim and the Fallout series.

== Career ==
Russell appeared onstage in Huntington's The Last Hurrah. Other stage credits include The Life of Galileo (Underground Railway Theater), The Bottom of the Lake (Tir Na Theatre), Daughter of Venus (Boston Playwrights' Theatre), A Pinter Duet, A House With No Walls, White People (New Repertory Theatre), And Then There Were None, A Prayer for Owen Meany (Stoneham Theatre), Talley's Folly (The Lyric Stage Company of Boston), and more than two dozen productions with the Wellfleet Harbor Actors' Theatre (WHAT), including The Beauty Queen of Leenane and the Eliott Norton Award-winning production of A New War. He is the author of 13 plays for young audiences and won the 2009 WHAT Award for Sustained Artistic Excellence.

Russell made his debut film appearances as Bob in the 2007 film Noëlle and in 2008 appeared as Luther Norris in the film Chatham. In 2009, he played a minor role in the film The Ghosts of Girlfriends Past.

In addition to voicing Garrett in the Thief video game series, he voiced Garrett's chief antagonist Karras in Thief II: The Metal Age, as well as many of the supporting characters in the series. He contributed the voice of the starship Von Braun's central computer XERXES and William Bedford Diego in System Shock 2. He also provided the voices of Andy, Mr. Buckingham, The Great One, Wadsworth, Sergeant RL-3, Cerberus, Enclave Scientists, an Enclave Soldier, and every Mr. Handy in Fallout 3, Fallout 4, and Fallout 76. The 2011 game Skyrim features Russell voicing a range of characters, including Barbas the talking dog, Daedric Prince Clavicus Vile, Belethor, and Thieves Guild leader Mercer Frey. In the 2015 game Fallout 4, he voices Codsworth and the synth detective Nick Valentine. He provided the voice for Lord Protector Corvo Attano in the 2016 video game Dishonored 2.

Russell did not return to the Thief franchise for the 2014 reboot because it utilized motion-capture acting, which required the voice actors to physically portray the characters and perform their own stunts. Eidos-Montréal announced that Russell had been replaced by Romano Orzari for the role of Garrett in the series, and explained their decision: "The actor playing Garrett needed to be able to perform his own stunts. Garrett's a really athletic guy. We could have pasted Stephen's voice on top of the actions and stunts of someone else, but this wouldn't appear natural." The decision upset some fans of the series, who initiated an online petition requesting Eidos-Montréal to bring back Russell as lead voice actor.

== Personal life ==
He has a son named Peter, who is an actor and musician, and a daughter named Robin, who is a voice actress.

== Selected voice credits ==
Year	Title	Role(s)	Notes
1998	Thief: The Dark Project	Garrett, Statue, Raoul, Guards, Hammerites, Servants	
1999	System Shock 2	Announcer, William Bedford Diego, The Many, OnceGrunt, XERXES	
2000	Thief II: The Metal Age	Garrett, Karras, Guards, Civilians, Hammerite	
2002	Freedom Force	Man O' War, Time Master, Iron Ox, Pan, Pinstripe, Civilian Male, Judge	
2002	Arx Fatalis	Fallan Orbiplanax, Undead Creatures, Goblins, Enoill Calpale, Sacred Dagger	Speech director
2003	Neverwinter Nights: Shadows of Undrentide	Additional Voices	
2004	Thief: Deadly Shadows	Garrett	
2005	Freedom Force vs The 3rd Reich	Iron Ox, Man 'O' War, Blitzkrieg, Charles Wilson, Pan, Pinstripe, Time Master, Pierre	
2006	Mage Knight: Apocalypse	Additional Voices	
2008	Fallout 3	Andy, Mr. Buckingham, The Great One, Additional Voices	
2011	The Elder Scrolls V: Skyrim	Mercer Frey, Clavicus Vile, Barbas, Additional Voices	
2015	The Magic Circle	The Old Pro	
2015	Fallout 4	Nick Valentine, Codsworth, Mr. Handy, Additional Voices	
2016	Fallout 4 Far Harbor	DiMA, Nick Valentine, Additional Voices	
2016	Dishonored 2	Corvo Attano	
2017	Prey	Dr. Sylvain Bellamy	
2018	Fallout 76	Mister Handy, Giles Sweetwater, Zeke, Additional Voices	
2018	Underworld Ascendant	Cabirus	
2019	ZED	The Dreamer	
2023	Starfield	Captain Petrov, Larry Dumbrosky, and Victor Aiza	
2023	Blood West	Protagonist	
2025	Thief VR: Legacy of Shadow	Garrett	
