= Thief VR: Legacy of Shadow =

2025 video game

- Developer: Maze Theory
- Publisher: Vertigo Games
- Series: Thief
- Platforms: Windows; PlayStation 5; Meta Quest 2; Meta Quest 3
- Release: December 4, 2025
- Genre: Stealth
- Mode: Single-player

Thief VR: Legacy of Shadow is a 2025 stealth video game developed by Maze Theory and published by Vertigo Games. Set between Thief: Deadly Shadows and the 2014 reboot, the game follows a thief named Magpie who gains a magical artifact containing the spirit of Garrett. It was released for Meta Quest 2, Meta Quest 3, SteamVR, and PlayStation VR2 on December 4, 2025.

== Gameplay ==
Thief VR: Legacy of Shadow is a stealth video game played from a first-person perspective. In the game, the player assumes control of Magpie, a thief who gains possession of a magical eyeball which contains the spirit of Garrett (voiced by Stephen Russell), who guides her throughout her journey.

As a thief, Magpie must infiltrate highly guarded complexes, pilfer for valuable items by pickpocketing and breaking into safes and vaults. While some enemies can be easily dispatched, some enemies are invunlerable and cannot be defeated. To avoid drawing attention, players can stick to darkness, hide behind cover, disable alarm systems, and hide incapacitated enemies. Players can also use their microphone to physically blow candles out. They can also activate Glyph Vision, which highlights the locations of enemies and other points of interest. Magpie's primary weapon of choice is bow and arrows. She also has access to other arrow types such as rope arrow to reach distant areas, and water arrows to extinguish fire. Other objects such as pottery and bottles can also be tossed to distract enemies. In addition to the main quest, some locations have several optional, objectives that players can complete.

== Story ==
Events of the game take place between the original trilogy and the 2014 reboot;(specifically 200 years after the events of Deadly Shadows and 200 years before the events of the 2014 reboot)

After finding a locket containing Garrett's spirit, Magpie, an orphan thief, must attempt to undermine Baron Ulysses Northcrest, who rules the city with an iron fist and is collecting relics for nefarious purposes.

== Development ==
The parent company of publisher Vertigo Games, Embracer Group, acquired the assets of Square Enix's European subsidiary, which include both Eidos Montreal and the Thief series. Vertigo Games then approached Maze Theory, the developer behind Peaky Blinders: The King's Ransom. According to Russ Harding, CEO of Maze Theory, it was designed as "both a continuation and a new entry point", as the team retained familiar elements of the franchise, such as its dystopian setting and narrative elements while featuring a new lead character. Harding felt that adapting the franchise as a VR game was a natural fit, as it made stealth encounters and immersive sim gameplay more "personal, physical, and real".

Maze Theory and Vertigo Games announced the game on June 4, 2025. The game was released on December 4, 2025 for Windows and PlayStation 5, supporting virtual reality devices including Meta Quest 2, Meta Quest 3, SteamVR, and PlayStation VR2.

== Reception ==
According to review aggregator Metacritic, the Meta Quest version received "generally favorable" reviews while the PlayStation 5 version received "mixed or average" reviews.

The Academy of Interactive Arts & Sciences nominated Thief VR: Legacy of Shadow for "Immersive Reality Game of the Year" at the 29th Annual D.I.C.E. Awards. It was also nominated for "Best VR/AR Game" at The Game Awards 2026.
