= Institute (disambiguation) =

An institute is a permanent organizational body created for a certain purpose.

Institute or institutes may also refer to:

== Places ==
- Institute, West Virginia, in the United States
- Institute, Wisconsin, in the United States
- Institut Islands in Western Australia
- İnstitut, Azerbaijan

== Culture and entertainment ==
- The French Institute (French: Institut de France), a French learned society
- Institute, a former alt rock band featuring Gavin Rossdale
- Institute F.C., an association football team in Northern Ireland
- The Institutes of Justinian (Latin: Institutiones Justiniani), part of the Justinian Code

== See also ==
- Institution (disambiguation)
- Institutiones (disambiguation)
- The Institute (disambiguation)
- Mechanics' Institutes, educational establishments
