= Nick Valentine =

Non-player character in Fallout 4

- Fallout character
- Nick Valentine in Fallout 4
- First game: Fallout 4 (2015)
- Designed by: Emil Pagliarulo; Liam Collins; William Shen
- Voiced by: Stephen Russell

In-universe information
- Race: Synth
- Occupation: Private detective
- Home: Diamond City, The Commonwealth

Nick Valentine is a fictional character in the post-apocalyptic themed Fallout media franchise. Valentine is first introduced as a non-player character in the 2015 role-playing video game Fallout 4, where he plays an important role in its main plotline by lending his assistance to the search for the abducted son of the game's player character, the sole survivor of a cryogenics-focused facility designed to withstand nuclear fallout built by a technology company known as Vault-Tec. With cracked synthetic skin torn in spots which expose the metallic structures underneath, Valentine is a type of sophisticated biomechanical android characters in Fallout 4 called "Synths". Possessing the preserved memories of a human police detective of the same name, Valentine is a private investigator whose speech and mannerisms echo the archetypal detective protagonist from hardboiled fiction. Valentine's other appearances include Fallout: Wasteland Warfare, a miniatures wargame which adapts the Fallout universe. Valentine is voiced by American voice actor Stephen Russell.

Nick Valentine is well received by video game journalists and players alike, being widely remembered as one of the best characters from Fallout 4 and the Fallout franchise as a whole.

== Character overview ==
Within series lore, Nick Valentine is a resident of Diamond City, a settlement built from the remains of Boston's Fenway Park. He is a Synth, a term used in the Commonwealth to refer to a type of advanced self-aware android built by an organization of elusive technocrats known as the Institute. Valentine is a rare prototype, made somewhere between overtly mechanical models that occasionally appear in ruined buildings and remote outposts as hostile enemies, and newer models who can pass for human and are rumored to be living amongst the Commonwealth's population. Synths are generally hated and feared throughout the Commonwealth, due to both bigoted attitudes as well as a genuine fear as a result of precedent incidents where human-masquerading robots suddenly murder other people.

“Putting on the hat and trenchcoat, I figured it let folks know I was serious about the whole thing. ‘Clothes make the man,’ and all that. Guess I felt they made me the man I wanted to be."

— Nick Valentine, Fallout 4 dialogue

Originally intended to be discarded synth prototype, Valentine survived his decommissioning with the memories of his namesake, a police detective who lived in Chicago and Boston, intact. Unlike other Synths, Valentine's presence in Diamond City is at the very least tolerated if not accepted, as he once saved the daughter of a former mayor of Diamond City and brought her back from the wilderness. Initially concerned only about his own survival, Valentine soon found out that helping others was his true calling, and it took him months before he started charging for his services. His benevolent reputation grew as more residents approach him to assist with private investigations or to locate missing people. Valentine eventually came to terms with who he is, accepted the role his memories played in shaping his own personality, and decided to work as a professional private investigator. He started dressing up like an archetypal "gumshoe", a slang term for a stereotypical private detective who wore street shoes with a thick, soft and quiet rubber sole.

== Concept and design ==
Fallout 4 Design Director Emil Pagliarulo noted that Nick Valentine was the first character he created and wrote before the decision was made to set Fallout 4 in the Commonwealth, a geographic region in the Eastern United States which encompasses the City of Boston and the former US state of Massachusetts. As Boston is Pagliarulo's hometown, the city's culture informs his contributions, which incorporated many "true-to-life references and icons". Pagliarulo credited designers Will Shen and Liam Collins for fleshing out the character based on the background he came up with. The basic concept for Valentine's design originated from a sketch by concept artist Adam Adamowicz which emerged during the game's early pre-production, depicting a "scraped up metallic ken doll detective" inspired by The X-Files. A "unique, advanced second-generation synth model", Valentine's mannerisms and personality was envisioned to be a firmly "noirish vibe", with concept art depicting him smoking a cigarette, and wears a trilby hat and trenchcoat. He is presented with yellow glowing irises and cracked white skin with a rubbery texture. A large hole exists where the side of his face and neck once was, with visible pistons and wires behind the exterior.

== Appearances ==
=== Fallout 4 ===
As part of the main storyline of Fallout 4, the player character is advised to seek out Nick Valentine in Diamond City, to locate their son. Valentine's assistant at the Valentine Detective Agency, Ellie Perkins, reveals that he had gone missing two weeks before while trailing a case and beseeches the player character to search for him at Park Street Station, his last known location. A thorough search of the disused service tunnels reveals that it is the site of another Vault-Tec facility, and that Valentine had been detained inside the facility by the Triggermen, a local criminal organization led by Skinny Malone, a former acquaintance of Valentine's. The player character frees Valentine and returns to Diamond City, where Valentine deduces the identity of their spouse's killer and the abductor of their son, a mercenary named Conrad Kellogg who works for the Institute. Valentine suggests that Dogmeat, the player character's dog companion, should be utilized to track Kellogg's scent in order to locate him.

Once Kellogg is dealt with and a cybernetic implant in his brain is retrieved, Valentine confers with the player character at Diamond City. He suggests a trip to a nearby settlement called Goodneighbor to speak to Doctor Amari, who works at a place known as the Memory Den, to extract information about the Institute from Kellogg's brain. As Doctor Amari could only work with the memories of living individuals, Valentine volunteers to have Kellogg's implant, which is made from technology developed by the Institute like himself, inserted into his system in order to help the player character access Kellogg's memories and locate their son's whereabouts.

In spite of his narrative importance, it is not mandatory for the player character to recruit Valentine as a travel companion. Unlike other companion characters, Valentine's clothing are not removable or changeable. Valentine uses a revolver pistol as his default weapon, and has a considerable amount of skill in security hacking. If the player character recruits Valentine and builds a positive affinity with him through eliciting his approval of their actions, Valentine will reveal more information about his origins and past, and the dialogue event tree eventually unlocks a side quest where Valentine requests for a search throughout the Commonwealth to uncover evidence and clues in order to hunt down a gangster who wronged the original Nick Valentine hundreds of years before the events of Fallout 4. Completing the quest and achieving maximum affinity points with Valentine will unlock a special "perk" ability for the benefit of the player.

Valentine plays a pivotal role in the downloadable content (DLC) expansion of Fallout 4, Far Harbor, where Ellie Perkins provides information about the disappearance of a girl named Kasumi, with the search leading to a location across the sea known as Far Harbor.

=== Other appearances ===
Nick Valentine has appeared in other Fallout media. He is featured as a miniature figure in the Survivors: Unusual Allies bundle set for the miniatures wargame, Fallout: Wasteland Warfare. The character also appears in Fallout: The Board Game and Fallout Shelter Online.

== Reception ==
Nick Valentine has had a very positive reception from critics and players. US Gamer staff formed a consensus naming Valentine the best video game character introduced in 2015. A 2015 reader's poll conducted by GamesRadar reveal that Valentine was one of the most popular companions among respondents. Shacknews named Valentine one of the best characters of 2015 for their year end review, praising the "juxtaposition between his noir roots and sci-fi setting", his integral contributions to the main plot by helping to bring the game into focus, as well as his personal story arc. Several commentators considered Valentine to be one of the most likeable characters in the entire Fallout series.

Valentine's character design as a hardboiled archetype and a damaged prototype android have been received enthusiastically. Heather Alexandra from Kotaku found Valentine's sequences as one of the points of difference between Fallout 3 and Fallout 4 in terms of content and style, and said they enjoyed the "post-apocalyptic neo noir" vibe throughout the duration of Valentine's involvement with the main storyline. US Gamer staff noted that while the character borrowed heavily from the screen performances of Humphrey Bogart as well as the literary style of Philip K. Dick with the nature of his memory and personality, the character's overall presentation has been well execution without being clichéd or overly unoriginal. Through the backstory of how he came to wear his signature hardboiled detective’s outfit, Joseph Knoop from Game Informer highlighted Nick Valentine as an exemplar of what it means to feel “right” within a new world, and how appearances can impact that. Some commentators observed that the character has not done anything to rectify or hide his disconcerting yet fascinating appearance, a sign that he is honest and has nothing to hide from the public.

Alec Meer from Rock, Paper, Shotgun was of the view that the character's defining trait is his altruism and kind personality, and that no companion character in other role-playing games has managed "actual kindness" to the same extent as Valentine, whose mixture of "world-weary cynicism and stalwart do-goodery" makes him stand out from a strong cast of characters in Fallout 4. Meer likened his personality, an "innate, obvious tenderness and warmth that isn't undermined by shooting raiders and mutants", to that of an archetypal loving grandfather's. Meer emphasized that Valentine's kind demeanor and unique perspective on the game's events stood out for him and many others in spite of the limited party management and dialogue in Fallout 4 or its technical issues, not because of it. Phil Savage from PC Gamer lauded the mechanism of Valentine inserting himself into conversations or his random chats with other non-player characters, which he said made the game world more lively and doesn't exist solely for the player character to be in it.

Commentators noted that Valentine's backstory provides a reference point for the game's racism and his struggle against human prejudice as a well-meaning Synth. Alexandra said the developers have used Valentine effectively in exploring ideas of bigotry, identity as well as the ramifications of suspicion" within the Fallout setting. Because his benevolent reputation precedes him, Valentine is broadly accepted in Diamond City, even as it shuts out mutants and has a zero tolerance for other Synths regardless of their intentions. Alexandra believed that the tension between his prestigious social status and his ascribed status as a known Synth, who are often treated as members of an underclass by many non-player characters, allows Fallout 4 to explore what she calls the "middle grounds of bigotry", where the beholder goes through quiet but hurtful moments whenever they are told they are “one of the good ones.” On the other hand, Meer said he would have preferred if Valentine has spoken up more during encounters with characters who either fights against Synths or defend them on their behalf, or when the player makes critical plot decisions that determines the fates of Synth characters.

Valentine's side quest content and gameplay utility has also received praise. Tim Turi from Game Informer lauded the side quests acquired through his detective agency to be some of the game's best. David Thier from Forbes said his companion quest thoroughly explores the cognitive dissonance associated with being a robot with fake memories. Thier found that not only is the culmination of his side quest to settle a personal score poignant, it also compliments the game's essential "do robots have souls" theme. Miranda Sanchez from IGN praised Valentine's built-in ability to unlock most doors and security terminals for her using his hacking skill as convenient. TheGamer also included Nick Valentine on their "Iconic Video Game Characters", stating that "If you've played Fallout 4, then you'll never forget about Nick Valentine, and you may even recognize him if you didn't play Fallout 4 since he's such a popular character in video game groups."

Stephen Russell's performance as Valentine has received acclaim. His voice for Valentine had been described as a "playful baritone", "gravelly", and "speakeasy incarnate". US Gamer praised Russell's work for lending a "noire-ish inflection" that fits the character without being banal. Meer said Valentine's tone differs from other "gumshoe" characters and their cynicism in that the character is focused on interest and sympathy. Alexandra said Russell's performance kept her engaged and she always had a sense of who his character was. For his work as Valentine and another character named Codsworth, Russell was nominated for the Supporting Performance In A Drama award for the National Academy of Video Game Trade Reviewers' 15th annual awards program honoring video game art, technology, and production in 2016.

== See also ==
- R. Daneel Olivaw, a robot character from the works of Isaac Asimov
