= Thief: The Dark Project =

1998 video game

- Developer: Looking Glass Studios
- Publisher: Eidos Interactive
- Director: Greg LoPiccolo
- Producer: Josh Randall
- Designer: Tim Stellmach
- Programmer: Tom Leonard
- Artist: Mark Lizotte
- Writers: Terri Brosius; Laura Baldwin; Ken Levine
- Composer: Eric Brosius
- Series: Thief
- Engine: Dark Engine
- Platform: Microsoft Windows
- Release: NA: December 1, 1998; UK: December 4, 1998
- Genre: Stealth
- Mode: Single-player

Thief: The Dark Project is a 1998 stealth video game developed by Looking Glass Studios and published by Eidos Interactive for Microsoft Windows. Set in a fantasy metropolis called the City, players take on the role of Garrett, a master thief trained by a secret society who, while carrying out a series of robberies, becomes embroiled in a complex plot that ultimately sees him attempting to prevent a great power from unleashing chaos on the world.

Thief was the first PC stealth game to use light and sound as game mechanics, and combined complex artificial intelligence with simulation systems to allow for emergent gameplay. The game is notable for its use of first-person perspective for non-confrontational gameplay, which challenged the first-person shooter market and led the developers to call it a "first-person sneaker". Its mechanics were influential on the immersive sim genre as well as later stealth games such as Tom Clancy's Splinter Cell and Hitman.

The game received critical acclaim and has been placed on numerous hall-of-fame lists, achieving sales of half a million units by 2000, making it Looking Glass' most commercially successful game. It is regarded as one of the greatest video games of all time and helped popularize the stealth genre. Thief was followed by an expanded edition entitled Thief Gold (1999) which modified certain missions and included a few brand new levels. The series continued with two sequels: Thief II: The Metal Age (2000), and Thief: Deadly Shadows (2004), as well as a reboot of the series, Thief (2014). Thief was one of two games in the series that Looking Glass worked on before its closure in 2000. A remastered version of the game, published by Nightdive Studios, is scheduled for release on December 3, 2026.

== Gameplay ==
The game's emphasis on stealth means that players must plan their moves carefully and use their environment to get around hostile enemies, or in some cases take them out using their equipment, such as the blackjack.

Thief takes place from a first-person perspective in a 3D environment, with the game's story taking place over a series of missions, in which the player character is able to perform various actions such as leaning, crouching, swimming, climbing, running and fighting, amongst other abilities. Levels are largely unscripted and maze-like, and allow for emergent gameplay; while non-player characters (NPCs) may either remain stationary or walk about on a patrol route, players have the freedom to choose how to get around them and the obstacles in a level's environments in order to complete specific tasks, such as getting through a locked door. In each level, the player is given a set of objectives to complete, such as stealing a specific object, which they must complete in order to progress to the next level. The player can choose to play on one of three difficulty settings before starting a level, which they can change between missions, with higher difficulties adding additional objectives such as not killing human NPCs or stealing a certain amount of loot from the amount available in a level, changing the amount of health the player character has, and changing how sensitive an NPC is to their environment. In some missions, players may find objectives being changed or new ones being added, due to certain circumstances they encounter, while failing a key objective or dying will fail a level, forcing a player to either replay it or load up a previous save.

As the game's emphasis is on stealth, players are encouraged to focus on concealment, evasion, distraction, misdirection, and subtle takedowns, rather than on outright confrontation; the player's character can engage in sword-based combat when the need arises, and can perform three different attacks as well as parrying, but has limited proficiency and damage resistance in such circumstances. To do so, players must remain aware of their surroundings. To assist them in remaining hidden, a special meter on the heads-up display (HUD), in the form of a gem, helps to indicate the player's visibility to NPCs; the brighter it is, the more easily they can be visually detected, thus sticking to dark, shady spots where the gem dims ensures the player is hidden, though NPCs can still find them if they get too close in front of them. To remain quiet, players must be careful of how much noise they produce, as well as what surfaces they are moving over; walking on soft surfaces like carpets and grass is preferable as footsteps remain quiet, compared to walking over metal floors and ceramic tiles, which produce a lot of noise. NPCs also produce noise, from whistling or walking about, for example, which can help players determine how far they are to their own position. Noise can be used by the player to mislead or distract NPCs, such as throwing an object to lure them elsewhere.

The game's NPCs feature artificial intelligence (AI) systems that detect unscripted visual and aural cues. If an NPC sees or hears something out of place, they will react to it, depending on the level of its suspicions; if for a brief second, they will simply ignore it, but if for long enough, they will become alert to their surroundings and begin searching the area. NPCs will react to things such as clashing swords or the reaction in other NPCs' voices, as well as to visual changes to their environment, such as blood stains, opened doors and fallen bodies; players can avoid leaving visual clues by cleaning them up, such as hiding bodies. NPCs are divided between three categories – "guards", "servants", and "non-human" – whose reactions vary; guards will call out an alert if they spot the player and attack them; servants will run for help if they spot the player or a body; non-human NPCs will merely pursue and attack the player. If a guard is significantly injured, he will try to escape and find help; some non-human NPCs will merely flee. Non-human characters range from giant spiders and feral creatures to zombies and ghosts, with certain levels containing survival horror elements.

To assist them on each level, the player character carries with them a few pieces of equipment – a blackjack, which can incapacitate humanoid NPCs; a sword, which can kill NPCs; and a bow, which can be used for ranged combat as well as a tool. Players can use a variety of arrows with their bow, each varying in properties; for example, "water arrows" can be used to douse torches and any other source of fire as well as clean up blood stains, "rope arrows" can attach a climbable rope to wooden surfaces, "moss arrows" can cover an area with moss that muffles footsteps and "fire arrows" can relight torches and do considerable damage to NPCs. Other tools are also available, including lockpicks, "flashbombs" (which can stun NPCs for a brief few moments), and potions. The player can cycle through the inventories for weapons/arrows and tools through the HUD. In addition, players can purchase additional arrows and tools between levels with the loot they have acquired (both loot and remaining items do not roll over between missions, encouraging their immediate use) and find additional items during a level. Players can also find books and scrolls that can contain information on in-game lore or useful clues to get around an obstacle in a level, as well as food that can be eaten and keys that can unlock doors and containers.

== Plot ==
=== Setting ===
Thief takes place in a metropolis called "the City", which has been noted to contain elements of the Middle Ages-like dark fantasy and the Industrial Revolution. Project director Greg LoPiccolo said in an early preview: "In essence [... it's] this undefined medieval age, sort of medieval [Europe] meets Brazil meets City of Lost Children. There's some electricity, some magic, and some 19th century machinery kind of stuff." The setting has been described as steampunk, a fantastical setting where steam engine technology is prominently used. It has also been argued that Thief is one of the earliest examples of the New Weird genre. During levels, the player may learn about the setting by finding notes and overhearing conversations; it has been noted that the player participates in the revelation of Thief's setting.

The City contains three factions: the Keepers, and two opposing religious orders known as the Pagans and the Order of the Hammer, or "Hammerites". The latter two have been cited as representations of chaos and order, respectively; the neutral, secretive Keepers strive to maintain balance within the City. The Hammerites worship a deity called "The Builder", and believe in progress, craftsmanship and righteousness; the Pagans, who have been described as "primitive, almost animalistic", worship the dangerous "Trickster" god and value the natural world. It has been assessed that the design of each group's architecture reflects their beliefs.

=== Story ===
The game's prologue sees Garrett, the protagonist, describing his youth as a homeless orphan on the City's streets. He is caught while attempting to pickpocket a suspicious man who reveals himself to be a Keeper named Artemus. Impressed by Garrett's ability to see him, he offers Garrett the chance to join his order. Garrett accepts, but later leaves the order to pursue a life of thievery. Years later, Garrett works as a thief, and is under pressure to join a crime ring. As punishment for his failure to pay a protection fee, he is targeted for assassination by the crime lord Ramirez. Garrett evades the assassins, and robs Ramirez's mansion in retaliation. Following this, he is approached by a woman named Viktoria—the representative of an anonymous client who was impressed by Garrett's theft from Ramirez. He is contracted to steal a sword from Constantine, an eccentric nobleman who recently arrived in the City. After Garrett completes the mission, Viktoria takes him to Constantine, who explains that he hired Garrett to steal his own sword as a test. Constantine offers him a fortune to steal The Eye—a gem kept within a sealed and deserted Hammerite cathedral.

To reach the cathedral, Garrett ventures through Old Quarter, a haunted, abandoned district of the City. Through an opening in the cathedral, The Eye informs Garrett of a nearby Keeper sanctuary, where he may learn how to unseal the cathedral. There, Garrett discovers that the cathedral was sealed to prevent the City's destruction by the Trickster. He learns that there are four talismans needed to remove the seal: two hidden in ancient ruins beneath the City, and two inside a Hammerite temple (in Thief Gold, one talisman is in possession of the mages and another was found at an opera house after it was taken from the caves below, while the other two are in the Lost City and the Hammerite Temple as in the original game). Garrett recovers the talismans and returns to the cathedral. After unsealing the cathedral, he learns that its inhabitants had been killed and made undead by The Eye. He returns The Eye to Constantine, who reveals himself to be the Trickster. Viktoria says that The Eye requires a flesh eye to function; she binds Garrett with vines and removes his right eye. The Trickster places it on the gemstone, and the two disappear through a portal. Garrett, left for dead, is found and freed by two Keepers. During his escape from the Trickster's mansion, he learns that the Trickster plans to use The Eye to revert the world to a wild state.

After Garrett escapes the mansion, he seeks help from the Order of the Hammer. However, he finds that the Trickster has attacked the Hammerite temple. In a refuge beneath the temple, he finds Hammerite survivors who provide him with a booby-trapped replica of The Eye. Garrett descends into the Trickster's domain, where he finds the Trickster performing a ritual with The Eye to complete his plan. Garrett stealthily substitutes The Eye with its copy, which kills the Trickster. Later, Garrett has acquired a mechanical replacement for his lost eye. On the streets of the City, Artemus approaches Garrett and claims that he will soon require the Keepers' help. Garrett dismisses him, and as he walks away, Artemus warns of the encroaching "metal age".

== Development ==
=== Origins ===
Thief began development in April 1996. For the game's original designer and writer Ken Levine, credited by The Telegraph as "a key figure in the creation" of Thief, inspirations came from two of his favourite games, Castle Wolfenstein and Diablo. The initial concept was to make an action role-playing game and Levine was given the job of designing the game's world and story. Levine said the initial ideas and projects that have later morphed into Dark Camelot, before eventually evolving into The Dark Project, included School of Wizards, Dark Elves Must Die and Better Red Than Undead, the latter of which was "a campy story" about communist zombies. The game was supposed to be a first-person sword fighting simulator, but "the marketing [department] killed the idea," to his disappointment. According to programmer Marc LeBlanc, "The first proposal was Better Red Than Undead, a '50s Cold War game where the Soviet Union is overrun with zombies and you have to go hack them to pieces as the loner from the CIA because bullets don't work on the undead." Doug Church said the game's design was built around the idea "of having factions who you could ally with or oppose yourself with or do things for or not."

=== Dark Camelot ===
The next concept, Dark Camelot, still focused on sword combat. Its plot—an inversion of Arthurian legend—featured Mordred as a misunderstood hero, King Arthur as a tyrannical villain and Merlin as a psychopath. According to Church, the game featured Morgan le Fay as Mordred's "sort of good" advisor and Guinevere as a lesbian who would betray Lancelot and help Mordred to break into Camelot and steal the Holy Grail. The game's design combined a first-person perspective with action, role-playing and adventure elements. Warren Spector, who had recently left Origin Systems to found Looking Glass Studios Austin, became Dark Camelot's producer after his predecessor departed. Artist Dan Thron said: "For a good long time, we had no idea what the game was about, until somebody stumbled upon the whole thief game play where you're not just running out trying to chop people up." Church recalled that "the basic stealth model was [...] having the guard looking the other way and you going past pretty quickly. So Paul [Nerath] had been pushing for a while that the thief side of it was the really interesting part and why not you just do a thief game." A previously unreleased trailer for Dark Camelot and its Stargate Engine was uploaded to YouTube in 2013.

=== Production ===
In early 1997, Dark Camelot's name was tentatively changed to The Dark Project and its design altered to focus on thievery and stealth. Nevertheless, some levels originally designed for Dark Camelot ended up in the final product. In March, project director Greg LoPiccolo described the game's design: "Essentially we're building a type of simulator [...] where object interactions are correct and physics are tied in correctly." Then-lead designer Jeff Yaus reiterated: "The goal is for everything to behave as it should. For example, things that burn will burn, and then it's up to the player to decide to burn things, whether or not we've anticipated it." The first draft of stealth design was presented by Levine and Dorian Hart on April 4. Levine said inspiration for the idea of being powerful when undetected but very vulnerable when exposed came from the concept of submarine warfare and in particular from the 1985 simulation video game Silent Service. Multiplayer support was planned, including the theftmatch mode where small teams of thieves compete under time pressure to steal the greatest value of swag from the territory of wealthy NPC's and their guard. Full-scale development on The Dark Project began in May 1997, with a frantic work on a demo level and trailer for E3 1997. Originally announced to come out in Summer 1997, the game was delayed to Winter 1997–98.

However, Looking Glass Studios experienced serious financial trouble as development progressed into mid-1997. The company's Austin branch closed, costing Spector and several game engine programmers; this team relocated to Ion Storm, and released Deus Ex in 2000. Spector later called his impact on Thief, "at best, minimal". Levine too had left The Dark Project project before the Keeper faction was added to the game. By April 18, Looking Glass Studios laid off half of its entire staff in six months, which damaged morale of The Dark Project team, which at this point was vastly different from the one with which the development began. "Few emotions can compare to the stress of heading to work not knowing who might be laid off, including yourself, or whether the doors would be locked when you got there", lead programmer Tom Leonard later said. This stress caused several team members to voluntarily quit, including the lead programmer, Briscoe Rogers, who had designed the game's AI system, which suffered from software bugs and problems with complexity.

When Leonard took over the position of lead programmer, he believed that the AI system was fixable; over several months, he learned that the pathfinding database—code that helps AI navigate a map—was unsalvageable. He completed the design—but not implementation—of a new system by November 1997, using an estimated one-fifth of the original code. Several features were removed during development, among them multiplayer support, a complex inventory interface, and branching mission structures. Leonard said they "focused in on creating a single-player, linear, mission-based game centered exclusively around stealth". He believed that the removal of multiplayer support and the game's renaming—from The Dark Project to Thief: The Dark Project—solidified this in the minds of the team. The game was renamed on April 3, 1998, the new title being much more descriptive and inspired by that of the role-playing game Vampire: The Masquerade. Several features have been brainstormed and rejected, including "Spider-Man-esque" ability to climb on walls and ceilings and the shrinking and invisibility potions. By summer 1998, the team was challenged by exhaustion and the game's numerous simulation and AI glitches. These problems resulted in what Leonard later described as "a game [that] could not be called fun". Implementation of Leonard's new AI system was halted so the team could quickly assemble proof-of-concept demos; publisher Eidos Interactive had grown skeptical over the team's vision. Work on the AI did not resume until March 1998, and after 12 more weeks of constant work, it was ready for what Leonard called, "real testing".

Three months before the game's scheduled ship date, most problems had been resolved. The team began to believe, as Leonard described, that Thief "did not stink, [and] might actually be fun". Further, the release of games like Commandos: Behind Enemy Lines, Half-Life, and Metal Gear Solid eased worries that experimental gameplay styles were unmarketable. According to Leonard, "A new energy revitalized the team. Long hours driven by passion and measured confidence marked the closing months of the project." The game went gold in November 1998, following an estimated 2.5 year development cycle and a $3 million budget.

=== Design ===
The design of Thief focused on stealth and evasion from a first-person perspective. Leonard said this idea challenged the standard first-person shooter concept: "It is a game style that many observers were concerned might not appeal to players [...] and even those intimately involved with the game had doubts at times." In response to the sentiment that their previous games "[required] a fair amount of investment from the player to get maximal enjoyment", the team specifically designed Thief to allow players to "pick [it] up and start playing". While the team's goal was to "push the envelope" with the game's design, Church said that it shared its core design with previous Looking Glass Studios games. He explained: "[We try to] provide a range of player capability in [a] world [where] the player can choose their own goals, and their own approaches to an obstacle[... so that] when they reach the goal it is far more satisfying", and that "flexible simulation of game elements is a powerful way to enable the player to make their own way in the world".

Thief was designed to be largely unscripted; events, instead of being pre-defined by designers, occur naturally. The intent was to further increase the amount of "player interaction and improvisation" over their previous games. According to Leonard, Thief's central gameplay mechanic was the player's relationship with NPCs, who are the primary obstacle in the game. The game's goal of emergent events required a sophisticated AI system. Leonard later demonstrated that first-person shooters, like Half-Life, often utilize "look and listen" AI systems, wherein NPCs become aggressive when the player is seen or heard. He explained that the Thief system defined a broader range of "internal states" an NPC could feel, such as suspicion. For example, an NPC who heard a suspicious noise would investigate rather than become immediately hostile.

Designer Randy Smith said: "In Thief the safe boundary is often between light and shadow [... but] these boundaries are [...] not stable or secure[... .] The player will eventually have to emerge from the safe zone [...] and embrace risk until another safe boundary can be found". He explained that players felt unsafe even when hidden, but learned to judge their level of safety as they improved. Certain levels included horror elements, and one such mission, Return to the Cathedral, intentionally removes players' ability to judge their vulnerability. Believing that "nothing augments the fear associated with boundaries like forcing the player to violate them of their own free will", Smith said of the mission: "Eventually [you force] yourself to do practically every scary thing you noticed the potential to do in the whole level". Kieron Gillen of PC Gamer UK believed that the level creates "a cycle of relaxation and abhorrence [... that results] in a devastating pummelling of the nerve endings".

The game's missions were designed to suit the story, rather than the story to fit the missions. Taking inspiration from GoldenEye 007, the team added a difficulty system that changes mission objectives; Leonard said "it allowed the designers to create a very different experience at each level of difficulty, without changing the overall geometry and structure of a mission. This gave the game a high degree of replayability at a minimum development cost". The team extended the concept by decreasing the player's ability to kill human characters on higher difficulty settings. Writer and voice actress Terri Brosius said: "We took pains to make sure all the missions could be won without killing any humans".

Project director Greg LoPiccolo wanted Thief's audio to both enrich the environment and enhance gameplay, and the game's design necessitated an advanced sound system. The designers created a "room database" for every mission; these provided a realistic representation of sound wave propagation. Audio designer Eric Brosius and the development team gave sound multiple roles. It was used to give the player aural clues about the NPCs' locations and internal states; to enhance this, vocals were recorded for NPCs. Conversely, sounds generated by objects gave clues to NPCs about the player's location, and NPCs used sound to communicate; a guard's call for help signals other guards within earshot. Sound was also used to divulge narrative information, so that stealthy players could eavesdrop on NPC conversations and learn more about the game's backstory.

=== Technology ===
Thief was developed with the Dark Engine, a proprietary game engine. It was written during the game's development, rather than as a separately budgeted project, which led to time constraint issues. An emphasis was placed on simulating real life physics; arrows would arc through the air rather than fly straight. The engine features alpha blending, texture filtering and lighting techniques. Motion capture technology was integrated to allow for realistic character animation. The engine's renderer—which draws the graphics—was largely written by Looking Glass Studios programmer Sean Barrett in fall 1995. While the renderer was expected to be finished before the game's release date, Barrett left the company in 1996. He later performed contract work for the company, and assisted in writing features like hardware support. However, the renderer was never fully addressed, and was less advanced than others of the time.

The Dark Engine was designed to be reusable, and to give programmers the ability to easily integrate their work. LeBlanc wrote the "Dark Object System", which became the center of this concept. According to Leonard, the object system was a "general database for managing the individual objects in a simulation". Designers were able to alter the game's behavior by manipulating objects—the content that composes the game—without writing additional code. The system also managed source data, the game's tangible content such as textures, maps, models and sounds. An unfinished build of the Dark Engine was used to develop System Shock 2, a collaboration between Looking Glass and Irrational Games. The object system worked so well that Thief and System Shock 2 used the same executable for most of their development.

=== Release ===
Thief was released by Eidos Interactive on December 1, 1998, in North America and on December 4 in the United Kingdom. An expanded edition of the game, Thief Gold, was released by Looking Glass and Eidos on November 2, 1999. It features three new missions, and improvements to the original 12. Its disc also contains a level editor and a "making of Thief II: The Metal Age" video, among other extras.

== Reception ==
Reception

Aggregate score
| Aggregator | Score |
|---|---|
| Metacritic | 92/100 |

Review scores
| Publication | Score |
|---|---|
| AllGame | 4.5/5 |
| Computer Gaming World | 4.5/5 |
| GamePro | 5/5 |
| GameSpot | 9.1/10 |
| IGN | 8.9/10 |
| Maximum PC | 9/10 |
| PC Gamer (UK) | 90% |
| PC Gamer (US) | 90% |
| PC Zone | 9.0/10 |
| Computer Games Strategy Plus | 4.5/5 |
| Next Generation | 4/5 |

Thief: The Dark Project received critical acclaim from publications including The Washington Post, PC Gamer, and Salon.com. Lance A. Larka of Computer Gaming World wrote: "If you're tired of Doom clones and hungry for challenge, give this fresh perspective game a try. I was pleasantly surprised." Emil Pagliarulo of The Adrenaline Vault wrote: "I will tell you, without reservation, [...] that this has become my favorite game of all time." Paul Presley of PC Zone called it "a bloody good game".

Kieron Gillen of PC Gamer UK wrote: "The freedom Thief offers you is at first terrifying, then absolutely intoxicating." Aaron Curtiss of Los Angeles Times noted that the game "demands thought". T. Liam McDonald of PC Gamer US called Thief "a challenging, riveting game that defies easy categorization" and praised the game for its focus on the player's cunning. Jason Cross of Computer Games Strategy Plus noted that "It's quite amazing how much fun it can be to avoid action". Chan Chun of New Straits Times described the game as being "incredibly immersive and suspenseful" and "a highly-recommended game for those yearning to be a night rogue". Peter Olafson of GamePro praised the game's AI and said that the game "gets better ... the more time you spend with it".

In a retrospective review, AllGame editor Peter Suciu praised the game, touting that "(the game's) first rate storyline as well as visual and audio effects make Thief quite an immersive gaming experience".

The game's sound was widely praised. Presley wrote: "The sound adds a whole new level of realism to the game and boosts that whole 'total immersion' thing to previously unattained levels." Larka noted that "the audio is simply amazing. With directional noises and haunting 'background' effects you are plunged into Garrett's shadowy world and left with a pounding heart and twitchy nerves." Wagner James Au of Salon.com noted that the game's level of suspense was "exquisite" and that its use of detailed aural cues as a gameplay device bordered on virtual reality.

Thief's graphics received a mixed reaction, with several negative comparisons to Half-Life and Unreal. However, Andrew Sanchez of Maximum PC praised the game's graphics and noted that the Dark Engine went "feature-for-feature with the LithTech, Quake, and Unreal Engines". He also praised the game's AI, sound and plot. Larka disliked the game's extremely dark areas, which required him to "max out the gamma correction and set [his] monitor to its brightest setting just to see the barest details" but called the graphics "seamless". Some reviews complained about collision detection issues.

The game's use of supernatural and cave-exploring elements received criticism, and several reviewers opined that more realistic, mansion-robbing missions should have been used instead. Presley believed that the game's undead enemies caused the game to "degenerate into the standard hack 'n' slash, sub-Conan sort of thing that Heretic, Hexen and a million others gave us" and that "it amounts to [...] an erosion of the storytelling skills that Looking Glass once had". Gillen decried certain levels for "infring[ing] on Tomb Raider territory, and then [not] quite pull[ing] it off". Larka found certain levels too difficult. Next Generation noted that while "sneaking can get repetitive", Thief is "still a fun game to play" and "a worthy addition to the genre".

In the United States, Thief: The Dark Project sold 88,101 units during 1999. Its global sales reached 500,000 copies by May 2000, making it Looking Glass Studios' most commercially successful game, according to the Boston Globe.

At the 3rd Annual Interactive Achievement Awards, Thief: The Dark Project was named as a nominee for "Outstanding Achievement in Sound Design" and tied with Age of Empires II for winning "Outstanding Achievement in Character or Story Development".

== Legacy ==
Thief was one of the first 3D stealth games for a personal computer, and its stealth gameplay innovations influenced later games in the genre. The game has been cited as the first to use light and shadow as a stealth mechanic, and the first to use audio cues, such as the ability to eavesdrop on conversations and alert guards with loud footsteps. The game's use of sound wave propagation, which allowed sounds to travel around corners and through rooms, became widely considered by game developers. Thief's influence has been recognized in other stealth games, such as Assassin's Creed, Hitman, Splinter Cell, and Tenchu. Marc Laidlaw, writer and designer on Half-Life, said that "Thief is the single most terrifying, immersive, and rewarding game I have played and the one single-player game I continue to replay. [...] There are countless books I wish I had written; Thief is one of the few games I wish I had worked on." Laidlaw called Thief his favorite game, an opinion shared by Fallout 3 lead designer Emil Pagliarulo, and Michel Sabbagh of Bethesda Softworks.

Thief: The Dark Project has been declared one of the greatest games of all time by several publications. Inducting it into its hall of fame, GameSpy writer Rich Carlson wrote: "With a tactical philosophy contrary to nearly every [first-person shooter] action game at that time, Thief rewarded stealth and sneaking over brazen frontal assault", continuing: "While inadvertently undermining the notion that all action games need be shooters, it carved a completely new niche in the same already glutted genre." GameSpot editor Greg Kasavin argued that, while Metal Gear Solid, Tenchu: Stealth Assassins and Thief all defined the stealth action genre, it was Thief that displayed "the purest depiction of what it might be like to slip from shadow to shadow" and "largely remains an unsurpassed achievement in gaming". In 2009, Thief was added to IGN's hall of fame. Sid Shuman, writing for GamePro, asserted that Thief "pioneered its own genre ... the stealth-action title". John Walker of Eurogamer wrote in a retrospective review: "Thief is an embarrassment to modern stealth games, each of which produces only a faded parody of this masterful original." In 2012, Mike Fahey of Kotaku called Thief "the best stealth game I've ever played", superior to modern games in the genre. That same year, Time named it one of the 100 greatest video games of all time.

Thief: The Dark Project was followed by two sequels, and a fourth game rebooting the series has also been released. Looking Glass Studios developed Thief II: The Metal Age, which received positive reviews when released in March 2000. Thief: Deadly Shadows, released for both Windows and the Xbox, was developed by Ion Storm due to the 2000 closure of Looking Glass Studios. After a troubled development cycle, the game's May 2004 release met with positive reviews. In May 2009, a fourth game, simply titled Thief was revealed to be in development by Eidos-Montréal for Windows, PlayStation 3 and Xbox 360. It received mixed reviews upon release. After Looking Glass Studios closed its doors, Thief has been supported by community modifications (mods). Standalone fan made remake The Dark Mod aims to recreate the "essence" of Thief in a modern game engine. Originally released in 2009 as a mod for Doom 3, in October 2013 it was released as an open-source standalone game. In December 2013, fan made high definition texture mod Thief Gold HD was released. A fan expansion, The Black Parade, was released in 2023 by Feuillade Industries.

In June 2026, Atari announced Thief: The Dark Project Remastered, a remaster developed by Nightdive Studios using its KEX Engine. The remaster, which includes content from Thief Gold alongside a new expansion called The Tarnished Mirror, is scheduled for release on December 3, 2026 for Nintendo Switch, Nintendo Switch 2, PlayStation 4, PlayStation 5, Windows, and Xbox Series X/S.

IGN also revealed that, for the first time, the universe would be expanded into a graphic novel, Thief: Pulse of Promise, and that it would be crowdfunded.
