= The Institutes =

The Institutes may refer to the following:

== Written works ==
- Institutes (Justinian), a component of the Corpus Juris Civilis
- Institutes (Gaius), a legal textbook by Gaius, written about 161 AD
- Institutes of the Christian Religion, a 1536 theological work by John Calvin
- The Institutes of Biblical Law, a 1973 book by Rousas John Rushdoony
- The Institutes of Grammar, the standard medieval Latin textbook, written by Priscian in late antiquity

== Organizations ==
- American Institute for Chartered Property Casualty Underwriters, branded as The Institutes, which administers the Chartered Property Casualty Underwriter (CPCU) professional designation

== See also ==
- Institutiones (disambiguation)
