= Creation Club =

Video game micropayment system

Creation Club logo

Creations (formerly Creation Club) is a system of microtransactions designed by Bethesda Game Studios for its games Fallout 4, The Elder Scrolls V: Skyrim – Special Edition and Starfield. The system was launched for Fallout 4 on August 29, 2017.

All (at the time) available Creation Club content for Skyrim was bundled with the Anniversary Edition, released on November 11, 2021 to coincide with the game's tenth anniversary.

On December 5, 2023, Bethesda replaced Creation Club with Creations, which combined paid creations and free mods. Modders can upload their free mods, or apply for the Bethesda Game Studios Verified Creator Program, which allows them to receive royalties for their paid mods. With Creation Club, modders could only receive payment if they were hired and paid by Bethesda. Creations thus makes it easier for modders to get paid for their mods.

== Reception ==
Despite being described by critics as "paid mods", Bethesda has disputed this, as the content was made by independent creators using funding from Bethesda.

At launch, Creation Club was criticized for the content being too similar to free mods, and the requirement to purchase in-game credits with real-world currency.

A number of modders supported the system, however, due to its "improved quality control process" and the fact that existing mods cannot be stolen and sold by others.

== Legal issues ==
The Creation Club is the instigating factor behind a class-action lawsuit filed on behalf of Fallout 4 customers against Bethesda Softworks and ZeniMax Media in 2019 over questionable business practices involving the handling of DLC content for the game's Season Pass. The suit asserted that the Season Pass was supposed to contain the totality of Fallout 4 downloadable content (DLC) for a single price, but the introduction of the Creation Club in 2017 reneged on that promise as Season Pass holders would be forced to purchase the Creation Club content to gain access to any additional Bethesda-made content.

During the suit's litigation in court, ZeniMax and Microsoft had announced plans to acquire ZeniMax, which was anticipated to close by June 2021. In a Memorandum opinion from the United States District Court for the District of Maryland, the Court granted Bethesda Softworks' motion to compel arbitration based on the Terms of Service contract that was signed by the plaintiff, Jacob Devine, in October 2022.
