= Institutiones =

Institutiones may refer to several works:

- Institutes of Gaius, legal textbook, written about 161 AD
- Institutes of Justinian, Latin: Institutiones Justiniani or "Justinian's Institutes", sixth century, largely based upon the Institutes of Gaius
- Institutiones Divinarum et Saecularium Litterarum, an encyclopedic work by Cassiodorus, sixth century
- Institutio canonicorum Aquisgranensis, Institutiones Aquisgranenses, the Instruction of canons of Aachen, disseminated in 816
- Institutiones calculi differentialis, Leonhard Euler, published 1755

== See also ==
- Institute (disambiguation)
- The Institutes (disambiguation)
