= The Magic Circle (video game) =

2015 video game

- Developer: Question
- Publisher: Question
- Designers: Stephen Alexander; Jordan Thomas
- Programmer: Kain Shin
- Writers: Stephen Alexander; Jordan Thomas
- Composer: Steve Pardo
- Engine: Unity
- Platforms: Windows, OS X, Linux, PlayStation 4, Xbox One
- Release: Windows, OS X; 9 July 2015; Linux; 15 July 2015; PlayStation 4; 26 April 2016; Xbox One; 29 June 2016
- Genre: Sandbox
- Mode: Single-player

The Magic Circle is a 2015 sandbox video game developed and published by American indie team Question for Windows, OS X, Linux, PlayStation 4, and Xbox One.

== Gameplay ==
The game primarily takes place in a sandbox environment but contains a mixture of puzzle-solving, indirect combat, and exploration. The player has the ability to trap enemies, objects and other items in the game in order to take their functions and modify the creature. The functions that the player collects can be given to any other object or creature to create minions that will defend the player or help them overcome certain obstacles and puzzles. All the player's decisions will have a major impact. The game has metafictional elements.

== Plot ==
In The Magic Circle, the player takes on the role of a QA tester who was recently hired to help prepare the live demo for a game that has been in development hell for nearly twenty years; said game is the sequel to a cult classic interactive fiction title with a dedicated fan following. The player is introduced to the developers of the game, who make their appearances in the world as floating eyes capable of changing the environment on a whim, only to discover that the two project leads, Ishmael Gilder and Maze Evelyn, have entered into a bitter rivalry over their respective creative philosophies, and due to their inability to cooperate have rendered the game largely vaporware. Once the playtest session is officially "complete", a rogue AI from a previous version of the game makes contact with the player and teaches them how to manipulate the creatures of the world to either complete or at least escape the game world.

== Development ==
The development team consisted of Stephen Alexander, Kain Shin and Jordan Thomas, who had previously worked on BioShock and Dishonored. According to the game's credits sequence, the team was supported further by Steve Pardo (Harmonix) who composed the original score, and Patrick Balthrop, who was the sound engineer. The voice cast included James Urbaniak, Ashly Burch, Karen Dyer, and Stephen Russell.

An early access version of the game was released on Steam in May 2015. A month later, the game was fully released.

== Reception ==
The game has a score of 80 out of 100 on aggregate review website Metacritic. It was nominated for the Excellence in Narrative award at the 2016 Independent Games Festival. As of March 2016, the game only sold about 16,500 units, according to Jordan Thomas of Question, which he called "unsustainable" and attributes to not having attempted to market the game.

IGN awarded it a score of 7.8 out of 10, saying "The Magic Circle is a marvelously creative, puzzling adventure that's very mad at you." GameSpot awarded it a score of 7.0 out of 10, saying "As a piece of work meant to comment on modern game design, it's wholly successful at creating a scenario perfectly illustrating just how Herculean a task it is for developers trying to create a game with a perfect balance."

The Magic Circle was nominated for "Most Innovative" game of 2015 by IGN.
