= Adrenaline Vault =

Defunct video game website

- One of the logos used by the website, this one from 1999 to 2002
- Website type: Video game website
- Headquarters
- Country of origin: United States
- Owners: NewWorld.com, Inc.
- Creators: Angel Munoz; Jeff Fox
- Industry: Video game journalism
- Website: www.avault.com
- Launched: 1995; 31 years ago
- Current status: Defunct
- Content license: Proprietary

The Adrenaline Vault, often shortened to AVault, was an American video game website based in Irving, Texas, founded in 1995 and active until 2013. The site covered PC and console gaming. At various points in its lifecycle, its content included news, game and hardware reviews, previews, feature articles, hints and cheats, editorials, demo downloads, developer articles, giveaways, blogs, and forums.

== History ==
The Adrenaline Vault was founded by Angel Munoz, who was working at the time as president of a Dallas investment banking and consulting firm. Munoz launched the Adrenaline Vault in Irving, Texas in 1995 with partner Jeff Fox; he was motivated to start an online gaming website because he was a fan of video gaming and felt that print video gaming media was compromising truthfulness to sell out to video game companies. He staffed the Adrenaline Vault with gaming hobbyists committed to honesty and independence. Publicity initially spread by word of mouth and by 2000 the Adrenaline Vault was one of the most visited gaming websites. Over time, its parent company NewWorld.com shifted focus to esports, converted the website to a blog and its popularity waned.

Munoz resigned as CEO of the Adrenaline Vault in 2011 and the board of directors announced their intention to sell off the company's assets. In 2013, the Adrenaline Vault closed permanently after it was targeted by a DDoS attack that "resulted in the complete loss of the website and its databases."

Notable staff members included publisher Brian Clair, who would go on to work as a producer on Sins of a Solar Empire and director of publishing at Stardock, editor Emil Pagliarulo, future video game designer at Bethesda, and staff writer Pete Hines, future Senior Vice President at Bethesda.

=== Page-jacking incident ===
In 1999, the Adrenaline Vault discovered they were victims of a page hijacking attack that redirected Adrenaline Vault search results to a pornographic website. The attack involved cloning popular websites, including meta tags; the cloned pages showed up on AltaVista web searches and automatically redirected visitors to the pornographic site. The Federal Trade Commission determined that the attacks were perpetrated by a Portuguese hacker and an Australian pornographic website, and obtained an injunction to stop the scam.

== Reception ==
The Adrenaline Vault received at least 3 million unique visitors per month in 1999 rising to an average of between 3 and 4 million monthly visitors in 2000. By 2002, it had been described as one of the larger gaming websites of the period, alongside Happy Puppy, Games Domain, and GameSpot.

In 1996, the Detroit Free Press selected the Adrenaline Vault as the "top-of-the-line" webzine on PC gaming, praising the site's succinct, straightforward, informative writing. In 1998, Greg Zeschuk, president of BioWare at the time, rated the Adrenaline Vault as one of his top five gaming websites. The Houston Chronicle rated the Adrenaline Vault the second best game site of 1997, behind GameSpot. The Toronto Star listed the Adrenaline Vault as one of the top ten gaming websites in 1997. In 1997, Computer Player! noted Adrenaline Vault as a great gaming site, writing: "Its trademark black and purple trimmings and sleek interface make Adrenaline Vault an informative, futuristic read." In 2001, Computer Gaming World included the Adrenaline Vault in their "Reality Check" review score compilations. In 2002, The Sunday Times called the Adrenaline Vault "one of the best of the gaming news and information sites" and named it the best games site for broadband users due to its comprehensive, alphabetically organized collection of game demos.

The Sydney Morning Herald considered the Adrenaline Vault "one of the most respected sources of independent and unbiased opinion", primarily on PC gaming but with "always insightful" views on console coverage. An APC review rated the Adrenaline Vault 9 out of 10, saying their team of "highly literate, knowledgeable reviewers... do a better job than their rivals such as Gamespot and CNet." In 2002, Živě.cz described the Adrenaline Vault as a "legendary online gaming magazine" and "one of the largest and most famous [magazines] on the Internet".
