= İnstitut =

Municipality in Samukh Rayon, Azerbaijan

Coordinates: 40°43′21″N 46°24′43″E

İnstitut is a settlement and municipality in the Samukh Rayon of Azerbaijan. It has a population of 1,946.
