= Institution (disambiguation) =

An institution is a social construct, both cultural and organizational.

Institution or institutions may also refer to:

- Formal organizations
- Institute
- The buildings maintained by such organizations, particularly:
  - Lunatic asylums
  - Prisons
- Institution (computer science)

== See also ==
- Institutions of Grammar (Latin: Institutiones Grammaticae), the standard medieval text on Latin grammar, written by Priscian in late antiquity
- Institute (disambiguation)
