= Fallout 4 =

2015 video game

- Developer: Bethesda Game Studios (Note: Additional work by id Software. Iron Galaxy co-developed the VR version.)
- Publisher: Bethesda Softworks
- Director: Todd Howard
- Producers: Ashley Cheng; Jeff Gardiner
- Designer: Emil Pagliarulo
- Programmer: Guy Carver
- Artist: Istvan Pely
- Writer: Emil Pagliarulo
- Composer: Inon Zur
- Series: Fallout
- Engine: Creation Engine
- Platforms: Microsoft Windows; PlayStation 4; PlayStation 5; Xbox One; Xbox Series X/S; Nintendo Switch 2
- Release: November 10, 2015: PS4, Windows, Xbox One; November 10, 2015; PS5, Xbox Series X/S; April 25, 2024; Anniversary Edition PS4, PS5, Windows, Xbox One, Xbox Series X/S; November 10, 2025; Nintendo Switch 2; February 24, 2026
- Genre: Action role-playing
- Mode: Single-player

Fallout 4 is a 2015 action role-playing game developed by Bethesda Game Studios and published by Bethesda Softworks. It is the fourth main game in the Fallout series and was released worldwide on November 10, 2015, for PlayStation 4, Windows, and Xbox One, with versions for PlayStation 5 and Xbox Series X/S released on April 25, 2024. The open world is set within a post-apocalyptic environment that encompasses the American city of Boston and the surrounding Massachusetts region, known in-game as "the Commonwealth".

The main story takes place in the year 2287, 10 years after the events of Fallout 3 and 210 years after a nuclear holocaust known as the "Great War". The player assumes control of a character simply referred to as the "Sole Survivor", who emerges from a long-term cryogenic stasis in Vault 111, an underground nuclear fallout shelter. After witnessing the murder of their spouse and the kidnapping of their son Shaun, the Sole Survivor ventures out into the Commonwealth to search for their missing child.

The player explores the game's dilapidated world, completes quests, assists factions, and acquires experience points to level up and increase the abilities of their character. New features to the series include the ability to develop and manage settlements and an extensive crafting system where materials scavenged from the environment can be used to craft explosives, upgrade weapons and armor, and construct, furnish, and improve settlements. It is the first game in the series to feature a fully voiced protagonist.

Fallout 4 received positive reviews from critics; many praised the world depth, player freedom, overall amount of content, crafting, story, characters, and soundtrack. Criticism was mainly directed at the game's simplified role-playing elements compared to its predecessors and technical issues. It shipped 12 million units to retailers, which generated US$750 million within the first 24 hours of its launch. It received numerous accolades from various gaming publications and award events, including the respective awards for Game of the Year and Best Game at the D.I.C.E. Awards and British Academy Games Awards. Bethesda released six downloadable content add-ons, including the expansions Far Harbor and Nuka-World. A version bundling the base game, its downloadable content and all previously released Creation Club content, called the Fallout 4: Anniversary Edition, was released on November 10, 2025, for all platforms, followed by a Nintendo Switch 2 version on February 24, 2026.

== Gameplay ==
Fallout 4 is an action role-playing game set in an open world environment. Gameplay is similar to that of Fallout 3 and Fallout: New Vegas, the two previous primary iterations in the series. However, unlike the previous two titles, the gun gameplay was handled by id Software. Returning features include a camera that can switch between a first-person and third-person perspective. Fallout 4 introduces features including a layered armor system, base-building, a dialogue system featuring 111,000 lines of dialogue, and a crafting system which implements every object in the game that the player can loot. Enemies such as Mole Rats, Raiders, Rad Roaches, Super Mutants, Deathclaws, and Feral Ghouls return along with the companion Dogmeat.

The player can freely roam in the game's world and leave a conversation at any time. If the player has discovered a certain location they may fast travel to it, unless playing on "Survival Difficulty", in which fast traveling is disabled. Weapons can be customized; the game includes over 50 guns, which can be crafted with a variety of modifications, such as receivers, barrel types, and laser focuses, with over 700 modifications available. Power Armor such as the T45 power armor was redesigned to be more like a vehicle than a suit of armor. It must be powered with battery-like "fusion cores" to operate most efficiently. Power Armor can be modified, allowing the player to add items such as a jet pack or select separate types of armor plating for each part of the suit.

A new feature of the series is the ability to craft and deconstruct settlements and buildings. The player can select and break down many in-game objects and structures, and use the resultant raw materials to freely build their own structures. The towns can be powered with working electricity, using a power line system. Merchants and non-player characters (also called NPCs) can inhabit the player's settlements, for which the player must provide sustenance by growing food in makeshift patches and building water pumps. The player can build defenses around their settlements, such as turrets, traps and bombs, to defend against random attacks. Alongside this, the settlements have a meter to measure happiness which can be increased by meeting settlement requirements (food, water, beds, defense, power, etc.) as well as providing options for settlers including a "Barber Chair" and a "Trading Stand".

When using V.A.T.S., real-time action is slowed down, and players can see the probability of hitting each body part of the enemies through a percentage ratio displayed here on the PlayStation 4 version.

The Pip-Boy, a personal computing device strapped to the player character's wrist, allows the player to access a menu with statistics, maps, data, and items the player has acquired. The player can find game cartridges, called Holotapes, which can be played on the Pip-Boy or a terminal. A new feature for the Pip-Boy interface is a downloadable application for iOS, Android, and Windows smartphones and tablets. This optional app allows players to access the Pip-Boy interface on a separate screen, and play the collected game cartridges when not playing the main game.

Another returning gameplay feature is the Vault-Tec Assisted Targeting System (V.A.T.S.). While using V.A.T.S., real-time combat is slowed down (instead of stopped entirely as in previous entries), and action is played out from varying camera angles in a computer graphics version of "bullet time". Various actions, including firing shots in V.A.T.S., expend the Sole Survivor's supply of Action Points, limiting what the player can do in a certain period. While in V.A.T.S., the player can target individual body parts with attacks to inflict specific injuries; headshots can be used for quick kills or to blind, legs can be targeted to slow enemy movement, and opponents can be disarmed by shooting at their weapons. Unlike previous games, in which the player had a random chance to inflict a critical hit, they are now performed manually through V.A.T.S. Attacking with V.A.T.S will drain AP (Action Points) with V.A.T.S being impossible if AP is insufficient. The amount of AP drain by each weapon use in V.A.T.S depends on the weapon used and its modifications.

At the beginning of the game, players are given points to spend on a character progression system called S.P.E.C.I.A.L. The system represents seven statistics, namely strength, perception, endurance, charisma, intelligence, agility, and luck. When the player earns enough experience points to gain a level, they unlock an ability. When the player allocates more points to a statistic, more abilities can be unlocked. These perks can be upgraded to improve the protagonist's efficiency and to further unlock abilities. There are about 275 perks available for the player to unlock. There is a soft level cap of 65535 and the game does not end once the main story is complete.

The player may travel with only one companion at a time, although other characters accompany the player in certain quests. These companions can interact with the environment on the player character's behalf. For example, if the player character does not have the required skills to hack a terminal or pick a lock, they can order the companion to do it for them. Any companion present besides Dogmeat will react to certain player actions in one of four ways (love, like, dislike, or hate), which either raises or lowers their "affinity". Raising a companion's affinity to 1,000 points will result in them "idolizing" the player and granting a specific perk. Partnership with companions is also possible at higher affinities. The companion will leave the player's service permanently if their affinity drops low enough, and some actions can turn them hostile on sight.

== Plot ==
=== Setting ===
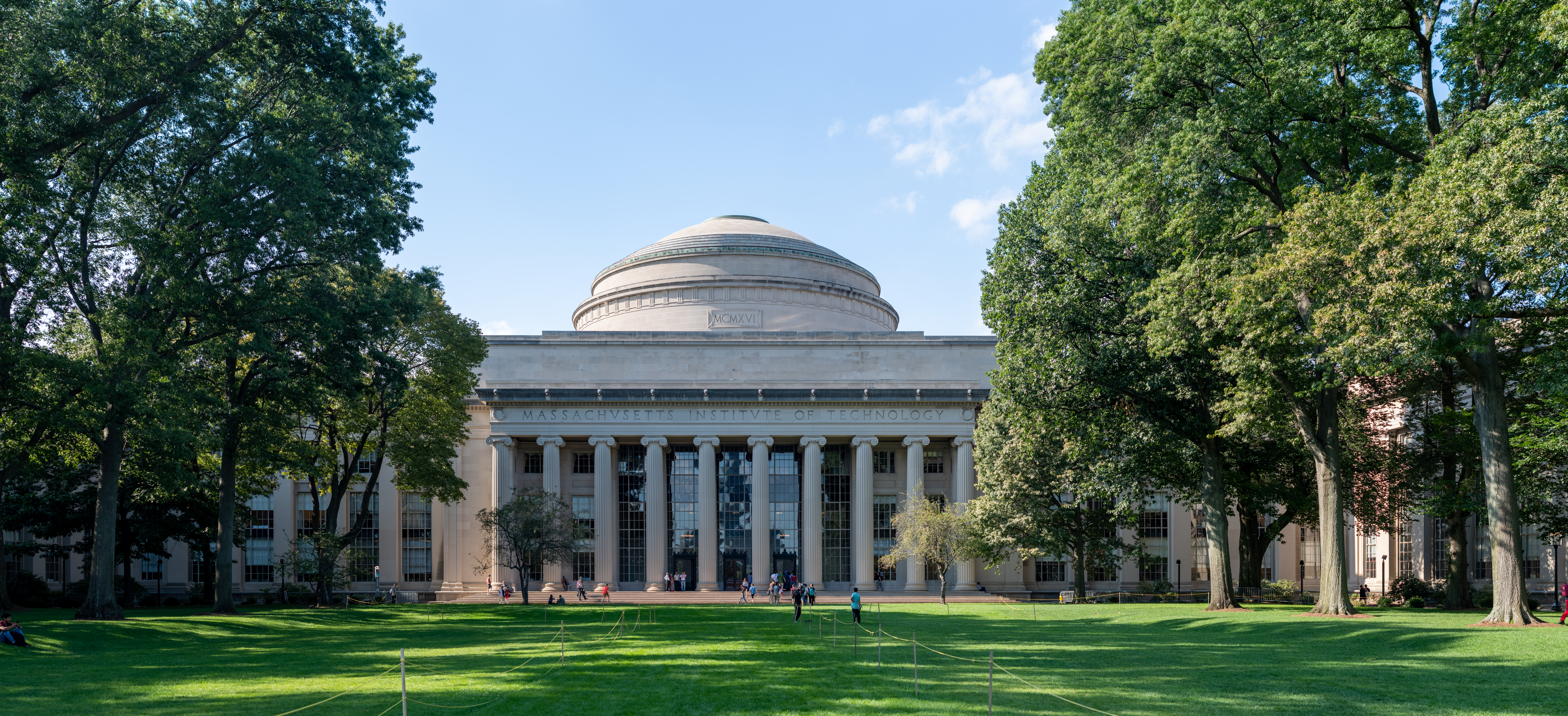
The Massachusetts Institute of Technology served as inspiration for the fictional Commonwealth Institute of Technology, which the Institute organization began from.

Fallout 4 takes place in the year 2287, 10 years after the events of Fallout 3 and 210 years after the Sino-American War, a war between the United States and China over natural resources, which ended via a nuclear holocaust called the Great War. The setting is post-apocalyptic, covering a region that includes Boston and other parts of New England known as "the Commonwealth". Unlike the previous titles, Fallout 4's story begins on the day the bombs dropped: October 23, 2077.

The game takes place in an alternate version of history that features 1940s and 1950s American aesthetics, such as diners and drive-in theaters, while design and technologies advance in the directions imagined during the era. The resulting universe is thus a retro-futuristic one, where society has evolved enough to produce laser weapons, manipulate genes, and create nearly-autonomous artificial intelligence, all within the confines of 1950s' technology, such as the widespread use of atomic power and vacuum tubes, as well as having the integrated circuitry of the digital age. The architecture, advertisements, and general living styles are depicted to be largely unchanged since the 1950s, while including futuristic products such as robotic rocking horses for children and high-tech fallout shelters known as Vaults. Post-war societal currency is based on bottle caps, often simply called "caps".

There are four main factions that the player can choose to support throughout the story: the Institute, a secretive technocratic hegemony society stemming from the former Commonwealth Institute of Technology that specializes in the creation of artificial humanoids called "synths"; the Brotherhood of Steel, a quasi-religious paramilitary aiming to regulate the usage of advanced technology; the Minutemen, a militia dedicated to protecting settlements that require help; and the Railroad, an underground organization desiring to rescue synths from the Institute.

=== Characters ===
The player's character takes shelter in Vault 111, emerging exactly 210 years later on October 23, 2287, and assuming the name of the "Sole Survivor". There are thirteen possible companions in the story. Dogmeat, a loyal German Shepherd, is the only mandatory companion, but six others must at least be encountered: Codsworth, the Sole Survivor's robotic butler; Deacon, a Railroad agent; John Hancock, mayor of the settlement Goodneighbor; Nick Valentine, a prototype synth detective; Piper Wright, an intrepid reporter; and Preston Garvey, a resilient member of the Minutemen.

The other six possible companions are Cait, an Irish-descended cage fighter; Curie, a robotic scientist; Danse, a Brotherhood of Steel Paladin; Robert MacCready, a mercenary; Strong, a Super Mutant sympathetic to humans; and X6-88, an Institute Courser.

Seven of the companions become romance options once they idolize the Sole Survivor, regardless of the player character's gender: Cait, Curie, Danse, Hancock, MacCready, Piper, and Preston. Though Curie cannot be romanced in her robot form, the Sole Survivor can do so once transferring her to a synth body.

=== Story ===
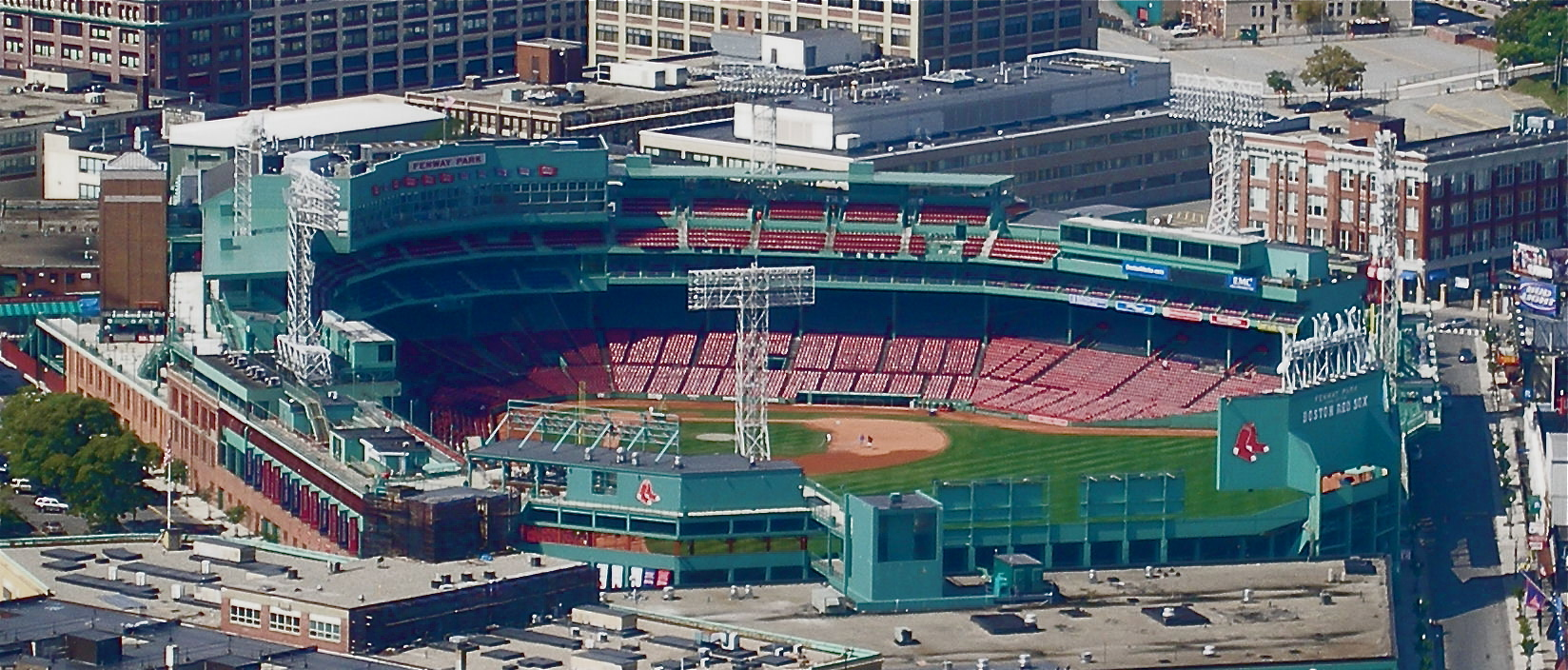
The largest settlement in the Commonwealth, Diamond City, is located within Fenway Park.

In the year 2077, a nuclear war erupts between the United States and China. In Massachusetts, the protagonist and their family—consisting of their husband Nate or wife Nora, depending on the player's chosen sex, and their baby son Shaun—escape into Vault 111, gaining entry due to a Vault-Tec representative signing them up for it immediately prior to the bombs dropping. Inside, the family members are tricked into entering cryogenic pods and frozen alive. 150 years later, the protagonist's spouse is killed and Shaun is taken away by a mysterious group. The life support system malfunctions at a later date and unfreezes the protagonist, who leaves their pod, realizing they are the Sole Survivor of Vault 111 as the remaining residents are deceased. They emerge from the vault into a wasteland now known as the Commonwealth.

Returning home, the player reunites with their former robot butler, Codsworth, who reveals that a total of 210 years have passed since the nuclear attack. At Codsworth's suggestion, the Sole Survivor reaches the nearby town of Concord, befriending a dog named Dogmeat and a member of a revived version of the Minutemen named Preston Garvey.

In Diamond City, a settlement built within Fenway Park, the Sole Survivor learns that an organization called the Institute has been terrifying the Commonwealth by kidnapping humans and replacing them with synths—humanoid robots who are indistinguishable from real humans. After rescuing the prototype synth private detective Nick Valentine, the Sole Survivor uncovers the identity of their spouse's killer as the mercenary Conrad Kellogg, who they proceed to hunt down and kill, avenging their spouse's murder, though he spends his last moments revealing that Shaun is inside the Institute. Meanwhile, the Brotherhood of Steel arrives in the Commonwealth from the Capital Wasteland onboard a modified airship, led by Elder Arthur Maxson.

The Sole Survivor uses a cybernetic device from Kellogg's brain to access his memories with the help of Dr. Amari, a brain specialist, and learns the only way to get into the Institute is through teleportation. They track down former Institute scientist Brian Virgil for help in infiltrating it, and he provides schematics for a large teleportation device. Receiving assistance from the Railroad and its leader Desdemona, the Sole Survivor retrieves a teleportation chip and has it decoded. After successfully building the device, the Sole Survivor enters the Institute.

The Sole Survivor meets a much older Shaun, who is revealed to have become the Institute's director and explains that his abduction 60 years prior was part of a synth experiment due to his uncorrupted pre-war DNA. After talking to Shaun, the player decides who to align with for a brewing war between the Institute, the Railroad, the Minutemen, and the Brotherhood of Steel.

- If the player chooses to side with the Minutemen, after Garvey promotes the player to General and retakes their old base, they repulse an Institute attack and devise a plan to eliminate them. The player infiltrates it again and blows up the reactor, killing Shaun and the rest of the Institute.
- Should the player choose to align themselves with the Institute, they learn that Shaun is dying of cancer and wants them to succeed him as director. The Sole Survivor destroys the Brotherhood of Steel's airship and massacres the Railroad's headquarters, removing the presence of both groups from the Commonwealth, after which Shaun peacefully passes away.
- If the player joins the Brotherhood of Steel, they will destroy the Railroad due to the group's desire to help synths, which clashes with the Brotherhood's ideology. They then infiltrate the Institute with the aid of a massive robot called Liberty Prime and blow up the reactor, killing Shaun and the rest of the Institute.
- If the player joins the Railroad, they will work for the Institute while secretly organizing a synth rebellion. The Brotherhood of Steel attacks the Railroad, requiring the Sole Survivor to destroy their airship. The player then assaults the Institute, freeing the synths and blowing up the reactor, killing Shaun and the rest of the Institute.

== Development ==
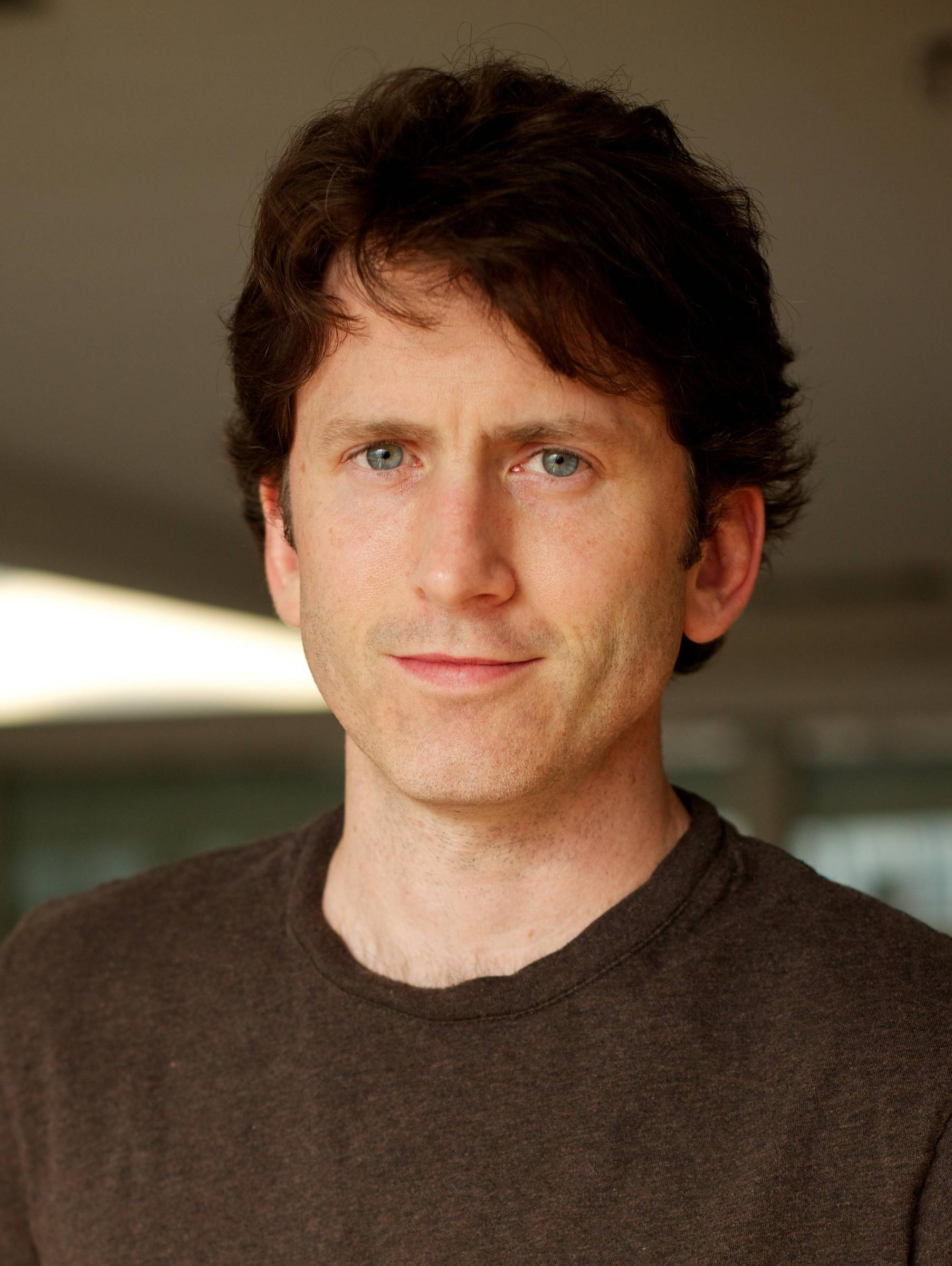
Todd Howard, game director of both Fallout 4 and Fallout 3, in 2010

The initial plans for Fallout 4 were formed in 2009, when director Todd Howard wanted to explore the world of Fallout before the bombs fell. Thus, a team began production on the game that year, including Istvan Pely, lead artist of Fallout 3, after finishing that game's downloadable content (DLC). Meanwhile, development on The Elder Scrolls V: Skyrim had Bethesda's full attention, and after that game was released in 2011, the studio continued to regularly support it until 2013 with updates and DLC. After that content was finished, Fallout 4 entered full production from mid-2013 to mid-2015.

=== Design ===
Unlike the previous two titles—Fallout 3 and Fallout: New Vegas—which used the Gamebryo engine, Fallout 4 uses the Creation Engine, previously used for The Elder Scrolls V: Skyrim. Modified for Fallout 4, the Creation Engine includes a revamped character editor system that allows freeform creation of faces without the use of sliders seen in previous games. Instead, the player can click and drag each feature of the face to accurately customize their character, which can either be a man or woman as the previous Fallout titles have featured. Bethesda announced that the game would run at 1080p resolution and 30 frames per second on PlayStation 4 and Xbox One. Bethesda revealed that mobile devices would be integrated into the game as a form of second screen, acting as a secondary display for the Pip-Boy.

For the first time in the Fallout series, the player's character, the Sole Survivor, is fully voice-acted, including all decision-based dialogue options. Brian T. Delaney and Courtenay Taylor are the two player character voice actors.

Todd Howard revealed that mods for the PC versions of the game would be usable on the Xbox One version and that the team hoped to bring them to the PlayStation 4 version eventually. When asked about the failed effort to add a paid mod system to The Elder Scrolls V: Skyrim, Howard stated there were no plans for a similar effort with Fallout 4. The mods created by PC players through The Creation Kit, which contains the official modding tools, were released for Xbox One and PlayStation 4 in May 2016 and November 2016 respectively.

=== Engine ===
Fallout 4 uses Bethesda's Creation Engine, which was created for The Elder Scrolls V: Skyrim.

Dynamic lighting allows shadows to be created by any structure or item in the game world. Howard stated in the E3 2015 Press Conference that the updated Creation Engine allows for next-generation god rays and advanced volumetric lighting. The engine features a variety of visual effects not present in previous Bethesda games such as motion blur, temporal anti-aliasing, height fog, dynamic dismemberment, screen space reflections, filmic tone mapping, an updated material system—for wet textures—among numerous others. The engine allows the Bethesda team to add more dynamic lighting to every scene as well as "paint surfaces with realistic materials". Bethesda released an example on how the engine works: "When a rain storm rolls in, our new material system allows the surfaces of the world to get wet, and a new cloth simulation system makes cloth, hair, and vegetation blow in the wind."

The updated Creation Engine allows for a more advanced character creation system, which uses sculpting—forgoing the series of sliders present in previous games. In detail, the new character creation system introduces a new, freeform, slider-free facial editor controlled via a dynamic, real-time modeling interface.

With regards to the aforementioned fluid animations, the updated engine also allows a much more open approach to conversations with NPCs—wherein the camera views can change depending on the player's preference from a first-person view to a cinematic third-person view—compared to Fallout 3's rigid and instanced conversation system. The protagonist features dynamic dialogue, which is context-sensitive and allows players to back out of a conversation. In Howard's words, "You are free to walk away anytime if you want, or you can even shoot him in the face."

== Marketing and release ==
On June 2, 2015, Bethesda published a countdown timer scheduled to expire on June 3, 2015, at 14:00 UTC. The game's website went live slightly ahead of schedule, revealing the game along with its box art and platforms. The site was taken down later but was put back up again at the scheduled time. The trailer was released when the countdown timer expired, and the game was confirmed to take place in Boston and its surrounding Massachusetts countryside, as suggested by earlier rumors. More details were given during Bethesda's E3 2015 press conference on June 14, 2015.

Fallout 4 became available for pre-order following the product announcement. In addition to the standard edition of the game, there is a collector's edition which includes a wearable replica of the Pip-Boy. This can house a smartphone device, which can run the second screen functionality of the game. As a pre-order bonus for the Windows version of the game, an announcer pack featuring the voice of Mister Handy was released for the multiplayer online battle arena game Dota 2, developed by Valve Corporation. Bethesda announced that Fallout 4 had gone gold on October 23, 2015. The game was released for Windows, PlayStation 4 and Xbox One on November 10, 2015.

=== Updates ===
After Fallout 4's release, Bethesda has released several patches to address some of the issues that were present at the game's launch along with presenting features that improve general gameplay. The first patch—coded as patch 1.2—fine-tuned the game by improving the frame rate. Patch 1.2 fixed a few bugs and errors present at the launch of the game but interfered with unofficial mod support. Patch 1.3 improved the game's graphics on all platforms, along with presenting the game with new features such as an added status menu for settlers in settlements. Regarding the graphical updates introduced in this patch, the PC platform was given a new weapon debris effect and a new ambient occlusion setting. The patch fixed several bugs and glitches present in the game.

Patch 1.4 was designed to ready the game for the upcoming Creation Kit and downloadable content. Patch 1.4 brought a variety of additions to the settlement building mechanic of the game by adding a symbol to new content placed in by the modding community along with adding a variety of items, such as Raider and Super Mutant decors. The patch also brought general improvements to the game's stability. The 1.5 patch added a revamped survival mode along with support for the downloadable and included bug fixes. Similar to the previous Bethesda games, Fallout 4's fan community-created unofficial patches to address issues and bugs unaddressed by the official patches.

During E3 2016, a virtual reality mode for the game was announced, to be released in 2017. Fallout 4 VR was released as a stand-alone game on December 4, 2017, for PC on the HTC Vive platform.

A performance update for the PlayStation 4 and Xbox One versions, allowing higher frame rates and 4K resolution support when played on PlayStation 5 and Xbox Series X/S, was announced in December 2022. It was planned for release in 2023, but was delayed. Bethesda later announced that the update was reworked into native versions for these platforms. The update was released on April 25, 2024, alongside stability improvements and fixes for existing platforms, ultrawide support for PC, and additional free Creation Club content. However, it also introduced a host of problems for players, including broken mod support and user interface issues in ultrawide mode on PC. Quality mode on Xbox also stopped working and settings on Steam Deck were wiped. Those playing the game through PlayStation Plus Extra were initially unable to update their version of the game.

=== Downloadable content ===
On February 16, 2016, Bethesda announced details, prices, and release dates for the first three add-ons for Fallout 4. The first add-on, Automatron, which allows the player to build their custom robot companion by using robot parts while adding additional quests, was released to the European and North American markets on March 22, 2016. This was followed by Wasteland Workshop on April 12, 2016, which introduces new build options for settlements and the ability for the player to put captured creatures or humans in a cage, and adds new decorations like neon lights and lettering. The third add-on, titled Far Harbor, is a story expansion set in the post-war city of Far Harbor, Maine, and was released on May 19, 2016.

On June 12, 2016, at E3 2016, Bethesda revealed three new add-on packages for the game; the first two, Contraptions Workshop, released on June 21, 2016, and Vault-Tec Workshop, released on July 26, 2016, are structured similarly to the Wasteland Workshop add-on, offering the player more build options and decorations; the Vault-Tec Workshop also adds a brief narrative. Fallout 4's third add-on, Nuka-World, which was released on August 30, 2016, adds an amusement park-based area for the player to explore, in which the player can either side with or put an end to raider groups residing in the park. The three raider factions introduced in the Nuka-World DLC are the Operators, the Disciples, and the Pack. The Operators prioritize wealth and operate with a "Caps"-driven mindset, emphasizing the economic potential of the park. The Disciples are known for their brutal and violent methods, favoring close-quarters combat and intimidation. They are responsible for "The Gauntlet," which functions as the players introduction to Nuka-World. The Pack adopts a primal identity, reflected in their behavior, zoo-inspired aesthetic, and control of their territory. Players who choose to align with the raiders gain the ability to expand their influence beyond Nuka-World, enabling them to conquer and control settlements across the Commonwealth.

=== Creation Club ===
At E3 2017, Bethesda announced that Fallout 4 would support Creation Club, an in-game support system to purchase and download custom content. Creation Club went live in August 2017.

== Reception ==
Reception

Aggregate score
Aggregator	Score
Metacritic	PC: 84/100; PS4: 87/100; XONE: 88/100

Review scores
Publication	Score
Destructoid	7.5/10
Electronic Gaming Monthly	9/10
Game Informer	9/10
GameRevolution	4.5/5
GameSpot	9/10
GamesRadar+	5/5
GameTrailers	9/10
Giant Bomb	(PC) 4/5 (Consoles) 3/5
IGN	9.5/10
PC Gamer (US)	88/100
Polygon	9.5/10
VideoGamer.com	9/10
The Guardian	3/5

Edit on Wikidata

Fallout 4 received "generally favorable" reviews on all three platforms according to the review aggregation website Metacritic.

GameSpot's Peter Brown awarded it a score of 9 out of 10, saying "Fallout 4 is an argument for substance over style and an excellent addition to the revered open-world series." Brown praised the "thought-provoking" narrative, "intuitive" creation tools, the large amount of content, the overall combat, and the overall freedom the player is given. Game Informer's Andrew Reiner scored the game a 9 out of 10 and said: "Bethesda has created another game you can lose your life in. New experiences just keep coming, and you always have another perk to unlock." Reiner praised the "vastly improved" combat, the "denser" world, and the "brilliant" score, but had mixed feelings about the visuals.

Dan Stapleton of IGN scored the game a 9.5 out of 10 and wrote: "The world, exploration, crafting, atmosphere, and story of Fallout 4 are all key parts of this hugely successful sandbox role-playing game. (It is) an adventure I'll definitely replay and revisit. Even the technical shakiness that crops up here and there can't even begin to slow down its momentum."

Phil Savage of PC Gamer mentioned that Fallout 4 is "a loving production. It's filled with care and attention to detail" and that it was "a pleasure to pick through the world". He concluded his review by stating "many of Fallout 4's problems, like every Bethesda RPG before it, are a consequence of what makes them unforgettable". Polygon awarded it a score of 9.5 out of 10, saying "Fallout 4 brings great gameplay to match its world and ambiance". Destructoid gave the game a 7.5 out of 10, writing "a lot of the franchise's signature problems have carried over directly into Fallout 4".

=== Anniversary Edition ===
The Anniversary Edition of Fallout 4, released October 23, 2025, was faced with mostly negative reviews. The new Creation Club content was seen as unnecessary and poorly designed, as much of the content was already available through mod and was mainly cosmetic. Further criticism was given for breaking popular mods, which were incompatible with the menu and scripting interfaces of the Creation Club.

=== Sales ===
Fallout 4 sold 1.2 million units on Steam in its first 24 hours of release. The game also sold more digital than physical units on day one of launch. With almost 470,000 concurrent Steam players on launch day, Fallout 4 broke Grand Theft Auto V's record for having the most concurrent online players in a Steam game not developed by Valve Corporation. Bethesda shipped 12 million units to retailers within the first 24 hours, grossing $750 million.

In February 2017, Pete Hines announced that Fallout 4 had sold more units over the same period than Skyrim, though he did not provide an official number.

In July 2026, Bethesda Game Studios announced that Fallout 4 had sold over 35 million copies worldwide.

=== Awards ===
Fallout 4 received numerous awards and nominations from gaming publications such as GameSpot, GamesRadar, EGM, GameRevolution, and IGN. The game received "Game of the Year" awards from the 19th Annual D.I.C.E. Awards and the 12th British Academy Games Awards, as well as numerous nominations for the top gaming honor from The Game Awards, The Daily Telegraph, PC Gamer, IGN and more.

It was placed on various lists of the best games of 2015 in which GameSpot put it at sixth, and GamesRadar at fourth. The game received the "Role-Playing Game of the Year" award from the Game Critics Awards and the Academy of Interactive Arts & Sciences.

Awards and nominations for Fallout 4
Year	Award	Category	Recipient(s)	Result	Ref(s).
2015	Game Critic Awards 2015	Best of Show	Fallout 4	Won	
2015	Game Critic Awards 2015	Best PC Game	Fallout 4	Won	
2015	Game Critic Awards 2015	Best Role Playing Game	Fallout 4	Won	
2015	33rd Golden Joystick Awards	Most Wanted Game	Fallout 4	Won	
2015	The Game Awards 2015	Game of the Year	Fallout 4	Nominated	
2015	The Game Awards 2015	Best Score/Soundtrack	Inon Zur	Nominated	
2015	The Game Awards 2015	Best Role Playing Game	Fallout 4	Nominated	
2016	19th Annual D.I.C.E. Awards	Game of the Year	Fallout 4	Won	
2016	19th Annual D.I.C.E. Awards	Role-Playing/Massively Multiplayer Game of the Year	Fallout 4	Won	
2016	19th Annual D.I.C.E. Awards	Outstanding Achievement in Game Direction	Fallout 4	Won	
2016	19th Annual D.I.C.E. Awards	Outstanding Achievement in Game Design	Fallout 4	Nominated	
2016	19th Annual D.I.C.E. Awards	Outstanding Achievement in Story	Fallout 4	Nominated	
2016	16th Game Developers Choice Awards	Game of the Year	Fallout 4	Nominated	
2016	16th Game Developers Choice Awards	Best Design	Fallout 4	Nominated	
2016	16th Game Developers Choice Awards	Best Technology	Fallout 4	Nominated	
2016	2016 SXSW Gaming Awards	Game of the Year	Fallout 4	Nominated	
2016	2016 SXSW Gaming Awards	Excellence in Technical Achievement	Fallout 4	Nominated	
2016	2016 SXSW Gaming Awards	Excellence in Design	Fallout 4	Nominated	
2016	15th National Academy of Video Game Trade Reviewers (NAVGTR) awards	Game of the Year	Fallout 4	Nominated	
2016	15th National Academy of Video Game Trade Reviewers (NAVGTR) awards	Animation, Artistic	Fallout 4	Nominated	
2016	15th National Academy of Video Game Trade Reviewers (NAVGTR) awards	Art Direction, Period Influence	Fallout 4	Nominated	
2016	15th National Academy of Video Game Trade Reviewers (NAVGTR) awards	Art Direction, Contemporary	Fallout 4	Nominated	
2016	15th National Academy of Video Game Trade Reviewers (NAVGTR) awards	Camera Direction in a Game Engine	Fallout 4	Nominated	
2016	15th National Academy of Video Game Trade Reviewers (NAVGTR) awards	Character Design	Fallout 4	Nominated	
2016	15th National Academy of Video Game Trade Reviewers (NAVGTR) awards	Costume Design	Fallout 4	Nominated	
2016	15th National Academy of Video Game Trade Reviewers (NAVGTR) awards	Direction in a Game Cinema	Fallout 4	Nominated	
2016	15th National Academy of Video Game Trade Reviewers (NAVGTR) awards	Game Design, Franchise	Fallout 4	Nominated	
2016	15th National Academy of Video Game Trade Reviewers (NAVGTR) awards	Game Engineering	Fallout 4	Nominated	
2016	15th National Academy of Video Game Trade Reviewers (NAVGTR) awards	Graphics, Technical	Fallout 4	Nominated	
2016	15th National Academy of Video Game Trade Reviewers (NAVGTR) awards	Performance in a Drama, Lead	Brian T. Delaney as "Male Player Character"	Nominated	
2016	15th National Academy of Video Game Trade Reviewers (NAVGTR) awards	Performance in a Drama, Supporting	Stephen Russell as "Codsworth/Nick Valentine"	Nominated	
2016	15th National Academy of Video Game Trade Reviewers (NAVGTR) awards	Song, Original or Adapted	"Good Neighbor"	Nominated	
2016	15th National Academy of Video Game Trade Reviewers (NAVGTR) awards	Song Collection	Fallout 4	Nominated	
2016	15th National Academy of Video Game Trade Reviewers (NAVGTR) awards	Sound Editing in a Game Cinema	Fallout 4	Nominated	
2016	15th National Academy of Video Game Trade Reviewers (NAVGTR) awards	Sound Effects	Fallout 4	Nominated	
2016	15th National Academy of Video Game Trade Reviewers (NAVGTR) awards	Use of Sound, Franchise	Fallout 4	Nominated	
2016	15th National Academy of Video Game Trade Reviewers (NAVGTR) awards	Writing in a Drama	Fallout 4	Nominated	
2016	15th National Academy of Video Game Trade Reviewers (NAVGTR) awards	Game, Franchise Role Playing	Fallout 4	Nominated	
2016	12th British Academy Games Awards	Best Game	Fallout 4	Won	
2016	12th British Academy Games Awards	Music	Inon Zur	Nominated	
2017	Game Critics Awards 2017	Best VR Game	Fallout 4 VR	Nominated	
2017	Gamescom 2017	Best Virtual Reality Game	Fallout 4 VR	Won	
2018	17th National Academy of Video Game Trade Reviewers (NAVGTR) awards	Control Design, VR	Fallout 4 VR	Nominated	
2018	17th National Academy of Video Game Trade Reviewers (NAVGTR) awards	Direction in Virtual Reality	Fallout 4 VR	Nominated	
2018	17th National Academy of Video Game Trade Reviewers (NAVGTR) awards	Sound Mixing in Virtual Reality	Fallout 4 VR	Nominated	

== Legal issues ==
Commercials for Fallout 4 featured the 1961 song "The Wanderer" sung by Dion DiMucci. The contract stipulated that Dion was entitled to bargain for a licensing fee and had the right to deny the use of the song if he did not approve of the advertisements' content. However, he filed a lawsuit claiming ZeniMax Media—Bethesda Softworks' holding company—failed to participate in these terms, demanding that the advertisements be taken down and he receive $1 million USD in damages. Court documents show that Dion was particularly unhappy with the song being used to depict the game's violent setting, saying that it "...featured repeated homicides in a dark, dystopian landscape, where violence is glorified as sport. The killings and physical violence were not to protect innocent life, but instead were repugnant and morally indefensible images designed to appeal to young consumers."

A class-action lawsuit was filed against Bethesda Softworks and ZeniMax in 2019 over its downloadable content (DLC). The suit asserted that the Season Pass was sold as offering "all of the Fallout 4 DLC we ever do" for a single price, but later with the introduction of the Creation Club in 2017, those that purchased the Season Pass have to purchase the Creation Club content if they wished to use it. During the suit's litigation in court, ZeniMax and Microsoft had announced plans for ZeniMax to be acquired into Xbox Game Studios, which was anticipated to close by June 2021. The plaintiffs in the case sought a preliminary injunction to block the acquisition as to prevent Microsoft from shielding ZeniMax's assets should they be found liable in the case, which was expected to be heard in 2022.

== Legacy ==
=== Anniversary Edition ===
A re-release of Fallout 4, titled Fallout 4: Anniversary Edition, was announced on October 23, 2025, featuring enhanced graphics, improved quests and equipment, additional content, and an in-game modding workshop. It was released on November 10, 2025, for PlayStation 4, PlayStation 5, Xbox One, Xbox Series X/S, and Microsoft Windows, with a version for Nintendo Switch 2 released on February 24, 2026.
