= Garrett (Thief) =

- Thief character
- Garrett as he appeared in Thief (2014)
- First game: Thief: The Dark Project (1998)
- Created by: Ken Levine
- Designed by: Marc Lizotte; Rob Waters
- Voiced by: Stephen Russell; Romano Orzari (2014)

Garrett is the protagonist of the stealth game series Thief. Introduced in Thief: The Dark Project, he was trained by the Keepers in secret so that he could join them; instead, Garrett used those skills to become a master thief. The 2014 reboot Thief introduced an reimagining of Garrett, with motivations and a personality that differ from those of the original. Praised for his personality and Stephen Russell's performance, many have praised Garrett as one of top antiheroes in video games, and even as one of gaming's best characters overall.

== Conception and development ==
Ken Levine, when working on Thief: The Dark Project's story, wanted the game's world to feel familiar to fantasy fans, but also to have a film noir aesthetic. In keeping with this, Levine came up with a character named "Palmer": a private detective hired to do a job by a beautiful woman. Feeling that there was a lack of anti-heroes in gaming at the time, Levine took inspiration from films from the 1970's and 1980's such as Chinatown and Blade Runner, keeping the protagonist a character with a failed past "living on the outs of society". As the character evolved into Garrett, he wanted to see how "dark" the character could be, taking whatever job was offered to him, including assassination. However, this was toned down after objections from other developers, which frustrated Levine, though he later admitted he felt it was the right direction to take the character. Garrett's character design itself was carried over from a previous Looking Glass Studios project, Dark Camelot. Developed by Marc Lizotte and Rob Waters, it was originally more "armory and Excalibur-looking", but as development progressed they changed his look to fit the fantasy setting and "into something meaner and leaner".

== Appearances ==
As a child Garrett was poor, without parents, and made a living as a pickpocket. This all changed when he met Keeper Artemus, who trained him and inducted him into the Keepers. Garrett left soon after to pursue a life of burglary, stealing from the rich.

In Thief: Deadly Shadows, a large scar runs down one side of his face, the result of Viktoria plucking out one of his eyes in Thief: The Dark Project. During the second and third games Garrett sees with a prosthesis mechanical eye, a piece of Mechanist technology given to him by the Hammerites at the end of The Dark Project. The mechanical eye incorporates a zoom lens. At the end of Thief: Deadly Shadows, Garrett catches hold of a small child trying to pick his pocket, and their conversation is almost identical to one between Artemus and Garrett as a child.

A reimagining of the character appears in the 2014 reboot titled Thief. Randy Smith, a designer on the original trilogy, suggested to the studio of creating a new character instead of using Garrett: "I was like, ‘Why don’t you guys just make your own character? If you really want to expand this franchise, show us a different person who’s similar to Garrett in this world, but has their own characteristics. Just give him a different name.’ That would have been interesting to me, to explore more of the world."

== Reception ==
The character was well received by critics. In 1999, GameSpot included him on the list of top ten heroes in gaming, stating how "over the course of his adventures, Garrett emerges from under the misanthropic facade as a character with a noble heart, whose immoral ways are reluctantly justified by an immoral talent that's well suited to his immoral world". GameSpot also chose him as one of the 64 contenders in the 2009 user poll "All Time Greatest Video Game Hero". In 2010, games™ listed him among the greatest ever game characters, commenting that "few main characters are as cynical and mysterious as Garrett" and adding that "it's Garrett's unique skills and upbringing that make him such a fascinating character". In 2011, Empire ranked him as the 29th greatest video-game character, calling him to "a medieval Han Solo type" and adding that it is "his sardonic amorality that shines through most of all, ensuring Garrett a place as one of gaming's most appealing anti-heroes". In 2008, PC Zone ranked him as PC gaming's ninth best character for his "wonderful" situational sarcasm, calling him a "medieval Sam Fisher of sorts" and contrasting him with Marcus Fenix (who was ranked as ninth worst). That same year, Garrett got an honorable mention on the list of the best Xbox Heroes by 360 Magazine along with a comment that Garrett "was highly unfortunate not to make the final 50" in the user poll.

In 2012, IGN featured him among gaming's most notorious anti-heroes, calling him "a true badass and anti-hero, combining a ruthless exterior with an unshakeable sense of honor". GameSpy's Mike Sharkey called Garrett a noticeable omission from the 2011 Guinness World Records Gamer's Edition's top 50 video-game characters. Also in 2012, GamesRadar ranked this "not exactly Robin Hood" as 35th "most memorable, influential, and badass" protagonist in games, also calling him "a pioneer of sorts, paving the way for the myriad other thieves and assassins of our time". In a 2021 list published by PC Gamer staff, Garrett is ranked among the most iconic characters in PC gaming.
