= Emil Pagliarulo =

American video game designer

- Education: Salem State University
- Occupation: Video game designer
- Employer: Bethesda Game Studios
- Known for: Thief II: The Metal Age; The Elder Scrolls IV: Oblivion; Fallout 3 The Elder Scrolls V: Skyrim; Starfield
- Awards: 2008 Game Developers Choice Awards for Best Writing

Emil Pagliarulo is an American video game designer who works at Bethesda Game Studios.

== Career ==
Pagliarulo started his career writing for the website Adrenaline Vault. He has been working for Bethesda Softworks since 2002. He previously worked for Looking Glass Studios and Ion Storm Austin. His first works at Bethesda include a credit for writing and quest design for The Elder Scrolls III: Bloodmoon, and quest design for The Elder Scrolls IV: Oblivion in which he wrote the Dark Brotherhood and Arena quest lines. He was then promoted to lead designer and lead writer for Fallout 3, for which he received the Game of the Year award and the Best Writing award at the 2008 Game Developers Choice Awards. He was credited as the senior designer and writer of The Elder Scrolls V: Skyrim and Fallout 4. In 2023, he was credited as lead writer and design director for Starfield.

== Video game credits ==
- Thief II: The Metal Age (2000)
- The Elder Scrolls III: Bloodmoon (2003), writing and quest design
- The Elder Scrolls IV: Oblivion (2006), additional design
- Fallout 3 (2008), quest design
- The Elder Scrolls V: Skyrim (2011), senior designer and writer
- Fallout Shelter (2015), lead writer
- Fallout 4 (2015), lead designer and writer
- Fallout 76 (2018), design director
- The Elder Scrolls: Blades (2020), executive producer and writer
- Starfield (2023), design director and writer
