= Thief (2014 video game) =

2014 video game

- Developer: Eidos-Montréal (Note: Ported to Windows by Nixxes Software, and to OS X by Feral Interactive)
- Publisher: Square Enix
- Director: Nicolas Cantin
- Producers: Stéphane Roy; Joe Khoury
- Designer: Alexandre Breault
- Programmers: David Gallardo; Frédéric Robichaud
- Artists: Nicolas Cantin; Emanuel Garcia
- Writer: Steven Gallagher
- Composer: Luc St-Pierre
- Series: Thief
- Engine: Unreal Engine 3
- Platforms: PlayStation 3 PlayStation 4 Windows; Xbox 360; Xbox One; OS X Nvidia Shield
- Release: NA: February 25, 2014; AU: February 27, 2014; EU: February 28, 2014
- Genre: Stealth
- Mode: Single-player

Thief is a stealth video game developed by Eidos-Montréal and published by Square Enix in February 2014 for PlayStation 3, PlayStation 4, Windows, Xbox 360, and Xbox One video gaming platforms. Feral Interactive brought the game to OS X in November 2015. It is a revival of the cult classic Thief video game series of which it is the fourth installment. Initially announced in 2009 as Thief 4, it was later announced in 2013 that the game is a reboot for the series.

The game is set in "The City", a dark fantasy world inspired by Victorian, Gothic, gaslight fantasy and steampunk aesthetics. Players control Garrett, a master thief who embarks on several missions focusing on stealing from the rich. Players may approach levels in a variety of ways; players can choose the action-oriented, lethal approach, where players will disable or kill enemies on their way to their destination, using a blackjack, a compound bow, and utilizing takedowns. Players may also opt for the non-lethal stealthy approach, where players minimize interaction with non-player characters and the environment in order to avoid detection. Players may choose which path to take to their destination, as each location contains several branching paths.

Upon release, the game had a mixed critical reception. Reviews praised the stealth mechanics and replay value, but criticized the level layouts and story.

== Gameplay ==
In the game, the player must rely on stealth to overcome various challenges and remain in the shadows to avoid being detected by hostile enemies.

The player controls Garrett, a master thief, through a series of missions, most of which are focused around stealing from the rich. As with the previous games in the series, players must use stealth to overcome challenges, while violence is left as a minimally effective last resort.

There are a variety of routes through each level, and the player is able to utilize a variety of playing styles to traverse them. The game offers ways to distract or kill guards, such as lighting barrels of oil, for example. Levels contain coins and valuable objects which Garrett can steal; these are converted into money which can be spent on equipment and upgrades. Garrett can pickpocket guards and other characters. The player may evade guards by hiding in shadows or around corners and is able to peek around edges and through keyholes to track the movements of enemies. Once Garrett is spotted, guards and other non-player characters will attempt to hunt him down. The developers have stated that the game's artificial intelligence is aware of the level design, and as such, guards will know in advance of potential hiding spots that the player may utilize.

The player may enter a "Focus" mode, which provides several advantages. It enhances Garrett's vision, highlighting pipes that can be climbed, or candles that can be put out to make the area darker. Focus can slow down time, so that Garrett can steal more effectively while pickpocketing. Garrett can use Focus to push enemies or perform debilitating attacks. It can be further upgraded over the course of the game.

Garrett carries a blackjack, used to knock guards unconscious; a collapsible, compound bow, which can be used for both combat and non-lethal purposes such as distracting guards; and a claw, which can be used to grapple onto higher ledges.

An experience point system for the in-game growth of the character was meant to be used in the final game but was later scrapped after negative feedback from fans and to reflect the fact that the character was already a master thief.

== Synopsis ==
=== Setting ===
Thief is set in a dark fantasy world inspired by Victorian, Gothic, and steampunk aesthetics. Garrett, a master thief who has been away from his hometown for a long time, returns to it, a place known only as The City, and finds it ruled with an iron grip by a tyrant called the Baron. While The City is ravaged by a plague, the rich continue to live in isolation and good fortune while the poor are forming numerous mobs against the authorities. Garrett intends to use the volatile situation to his favor.

A reboot of the series, the story is set several hundreds of years after the original events in the same universe, with clues to the backstory being hidden among documents, letters and plaques. The original master thief Garrett's (known as the legendary Sneak Thief) iconic mechanical eye is one of the hidden unique loots in the game that can be found inside of a prison complex. Other references to the original series include the Keepers, Hammerites and the Old Gods, with ruins relating to them being visitable locations throughout the City and beneath.

=== Plot ===
During a night of revelry in the city, Garrett is hired by his contact Basso to steal from the manor of Baron Northcrest, the tyrannous ruler of the city; Garrett is partnered with Erin to assist him. Erin is naïve and reckless, and needlessly kills a guard using her grappling Claw, leading Garrett to rebuke her. Atop the manor's roof, the pair witness Northcrest inside leading a group of men into conducting a magical ritual. A wary Garrett calls off the job, but Erin objects; in the ensuing struggle, Erin falls through a skylight and absorbs the energy being channeled through the ritual. Garrett inadvertently falls into the hall and is knocked out.

Garrett awakens from a coma one year later to find that the city is being plagued by a disease of unknown origin called "the Gloom", and that various districts of the city are in lockdown. Returning to his hideout, Garret receives a message from Basso, who hires Garrett to steal a ring from a noble's corpse at a foundry used to dispose of victims of the Gloom. Garrett evades Northcrest's right-hand man, the Thief-Taker General, and retrieves the ring. There, he meets a man called Orion, the leader of a resistance movement working to bring down Northcrest. Agreeing to help Orion, Garrett ventures to a hidden brothel to find a unique book, visiting Erin's hideout in the process and experiencing a vision of her mentioning a place called Moira Asylum. Basso is arrested by the Thief-Taker General, prompting Garrett to rescue him. Garrett breaks into Northcrest's vault and recovers a piece of a mysterious stone called the Primal, which was used in the ritual at Northcrest's manor. Another vision reveals to Garrett that Erin is alive and under the influence of the power from the stone.

Garrett explores Moira Asylum, uncovering a second piece of the stone, but unable to find Erin. Garrett returns to Northcrest's manor to confront him, while Orion sparks a revolution on the city's streets. Northcrest reveals to Garrett that his ritual was intended to harness the power of the stone as a new energy source. The disruption of the ritual and fragmentation of the stone unleashed the Gloom unto the city. Orion, it transpires, is Northcrest's illegitimate brother, Aldous, who seeks the Primal for his own purposes. Seeking information on the stone, Garrett visits an informant, the Queen of Beggars, who tells him that the Primal must be reassembled and its power contained to save the city from the Gloom.

Garrett enters an old cathedral and finds Aldous using Erin in an attempt to heal citizens, assisted by the items stolen by Garrett. The Thief-Taker General arrives as Aldous flees with Erin; Garrett kills the General and pursues Aldous to his hideout aboard a ship. Erin unleashes the power of the Primal, killing Aldous, before attacking Garrett. He manages to reassemble the stone, restoring Erin, but unleashing a force which knocks her overboard. Garrett throws down her Claw to save her and falls unconscious. He awakens to find the Claw embedded in a post next to wet footprints, implying Erin survived, as dawn arrives.

== Development ==
Thief was initially announced in 2009 under the working title Thief 4 (stylized as Thi4f), after rumours of its development. Developed at Eidos-Montréal, the game was handled by a team other than the one that made Deus Ex: Human Revolution. The development team was initially kept small, and the game remained in concept phase for a long time. During this, experimental design changes were proposed, such as having a third-person perspective, having a new protagonist, or environmental clambering similar to the Assassin's Creed series of games. The general manager of the studio, Stephane D'Astous, was quoted as stating Thief 4 was currently in early development: "We're in the early development stages for Thief 4, but this is an incredibly ambitious project and a very exciting one. It's too early for us to offer any specific game details. Right now, we are focused on recruiting the very best talent to join the core team at the studio and help us make what we believe will be one of the most exciting games on the market." After some gossip that several major members of Eidos Montréal left their jobs, D'Astous countered these claims by saying, "We will be able to be a little more communicative later on, hopefully before the year's end. Right now, Thief is our priority and we're putting everything behind it to make sure it's as successful as our first game". In January 2013, NeoGAF found LinkedIn files that indicated network programmers were working on the project. Eidos-Montréal was expanded in 2010 with a separate team for multiplayer development, and when MP producer Joe Khoury was asked if they would also work on their next project, Thief 4, he did not deny or confirm.

Randy Smith, a designer on the original trilogy, suggested to the studio of creating a new character instead of using Garrett: "I was like, 'Why don't you guys just make your own character? If you really want to expand this franchise, show us a different person who's similar to Garrett in this world, but has their own characteristics. Just give him a different name.' That would have been interesting to me, to explore more of the world."

Although the game was initially expected for seventh-generation consoles, it was switched to eighth-generation consoles during development. This was confirmed when in March 2013, the game was unveiled through that month's issue of Game Informer and announced to be released on the PC, PlayStation 4 and "other next-gen consoles". The game is a reboot of the Thief series. Based upon initial press release photos Phil Savage of PC Gamer made some comparisons to Dishonored, stating "It all looks a bit Dishonored, which is apt, given that Dishonored looked a bit Thief."

Eidos announced that the veteran voice actor Stephen Russell has been replaced by actor Romano Orzari for the role of the main protagonist in the series, Garrett. In a statement, Eidos explained their decision. "We made the decision to record our actor's voices and their movement at the same time using a full performance capture technique. The actor playing Garrett needed to be able to perform his own stunts. Garrett's a really athletic guy. We could have pasted Stephen's voice on top of the actions and stunts of someone else, but this wouldn't appear natural." This decision has upset some fans of the series who initiated an online petition requesting Eidos-Montréal to bring back Stephen Russell as lead voice actor.

Thief supports Mantle as well as AMD TrueAudio.

== Reception ==
Reception

Aggregate score
Aggregator	Score
Metacritic	PC: 70/100; PS4: 67/100; XONE: 69/100

Review scores
Publication	Score
Destructoid	7.5/10
Edge	7/10
Electronic Gaming Monthly	3.5/10
Game Informer	8/10
GameSpot	6/10
GamesRadar+	3.5/5
GameTrailers	7.5/10
GameZone	6.5/10
IGN	6.8/10
Joystiq	4/5
PlayStation Official Magazine – UK	7/10
Official Xbox Magazine (UK)	7/10
PC Gamer (US)	7.9/10
Polygon	6/10
Digital Spy	4/5
The Telegraph	2/5

Thief received "mixed or average" reviews, according to video game review aggregator Metacritic. Most reviewers praised its stealth gameplay, level design, graphics, and replay value, but criticized its map layout, technical issues, and story.

GameZone's Mike Splechta gave the PlayStation 4 version a 6.5/10, stating: "Some might be able to look past Thief's shortcomings and instead only focus on the moments of brilliance. However, I imagine long-time Thief fans hoping for Garrett's grand return might be somewhat disappointed." Giving the reboot a score of 6.8, IGN's Dan Stapleton criticized the decision to replace the voice actor for Garrett, saying that the new actor, Romano Orzari, made the protagonist seem "flat" and "poorly lip-synced"; Stapleton also took issue with the sub-par AI, lack of variety or creativity in Garrett's choice of weapons, the poorly designed and cumbersome layout of The City, and the story, calling it "bland" and "supernatural-driven". He praised the ability to change the difficulty of the game so as to make it more challenging and was also positive about Garrett's new sprinting mechanics. The Telegraph's Tim Martin was more scathing in his review, giving the game 2 stars out of 5 and lambasting the rote manner in which each level plays out, forcing the player to conform to one set path through the maps and very rarely allowing him a sense of freedom and challenge. The review also pointed out that increasing the game's difficulty will do little to heighten any sense of danger or unpredictability; overall, Martin thought to be a half-hearted disaster.

Eurogamer Italy gave it a score of 9/10, saying: "one of the best action-stealth titles in years and the first serious contender for the '2014 Game of the Year' contest". Digital Spy gave it a positive review, stating: "While the game does have its faults – particularly falling apart when Garrett is spotted – Thief excels in the shadows as a pure stealth title, becoming increasingly enjoyable as your skills improve."

== Future ==
At a press event hosted by Official Xbox Magazine a week before the game's release, Eidos-Montréal's Nick Cantin hinted a Thief sequel could be possible, depending upon its reception: "Nothing's announced yet but we're very keen to see how people respond to the game [...] We've built a really big universe around the first game, and there's a lot of layers to it – the world is really deep [...] so there's a lot of possibilities to jump on."
