= Robbing the Cradle =

Level of the video game Thief: Deadly Shadows

"Robbing the Cradle" is a level in the 2004 video game Thief: Deadly Shadows, developed by Ion Storm. Unlike other levels in the game, it features a strong survival horror theme, in addition to the stealth gameplay typical of the Thief series. Players traverse an abandoned, haunted orphanage and mental asylum called the Shalebridge Cradle, while attempting to free the soul of a young girl from the building's captivity.

The level was designed by Jordan Thomas and Randy Smith, with a soundscape composed by Eric Brosius. Using theories of interactive horror design developed by Smith in 2000, the team sought to create the scariest level ever to appear in a game. They took influence from works such as House of Leaves, Session 9, and the Silent Hill series, and they studied mental asylums and reportedly haunted buildings for inspiration.

"Robbing the Cradle" was widely praised, and it has been described by several publications as one of the scariest levels in the history of video games. Jordan Thomas went on to create the "Fort Frolic" level in BioShock, and to serve as creative director for BioShock 2. The positive reception of "Robbing the Cradle" inspired Eidos-Montréal to create a similar asylum level in Thief (2014).

== Overview ==
The main lobby of the Outer Cradle

"Robbing the Cradle" is the penultimate level of Thief: Deadly Shadows (2004), a video game developed by Ion Storm. In addition to the stealth gameplay typical of the game, the level features a strong survival horror theme. "Robbing the Cradle" takes place inside the Shalebridge Cradle, a conscious, malevolent and abandoned orphanage and mental institution. It is patrolled by creatures called "Puppets", the reanimated bodies of former inmates. Protagonist Garrett enters the building in hopes of solving a mystery related to a supernatural murderer, the Gray Lady. Once inside, he encounters the ghost of a deceased orphan, Lauryl, who was killed by the Gray Lady. She is trapped within the Cradle because it "remembers" her.

The Shalebridge Cradle is divided into two sections: the "Inner Cradle" and "Outer Cradle". The player begins in the Outer Cradle, which is designed to terrify players, but which secretly contains no dangers or enemies. The Inner Cradle is roamed by Puppets. The building's backstory is unveiled in a nonlinear fashion, via clues scattered within the level. The player must free Lauryl by locating and disposing of artifacts that allow the Cradle to remember her. However, after completing this objective, Garrett discovers that the Cradle has remembered him. To escape, the player travels back in time within the Cradle's memory, while fleeing from silhouettes of the Cradle's staff. The player ends the level by leaping from the Cradle's highest window, which convinces the building that Garrett is dead, thus leaving him free.

== Development ==
The central ideas behind "Robbing the Cradle" were conceived by Thief: Deadly Shadows project director Randy Smith in 2000. Smith had designed a horror-based level, "Return to the Cathedral", in 1998's Thief: The Dark Project. Although he had intended only to make it "atmospheric and suspenseful", the level was widely held to be terrifying. In 2000, Smith was in the process of being hired at Ion Storm to work on Deadly Shadows, and he was contacted by PC Gamer UK writer Kieron Gillen to discuss "Return to the Cathedral". As the interview progressed via email, Smith developed a theory of horror design to retroactively explain the success of the level. His core concept was that players try to establish boundaries between safety and danger, and that fear results when these boundaries become unpredictable, or when the player is compelled to cross them "of their own free will". Smith decided to consciously apply this theory in Deadly Shadows, and the result was "Robbing the Cradle".

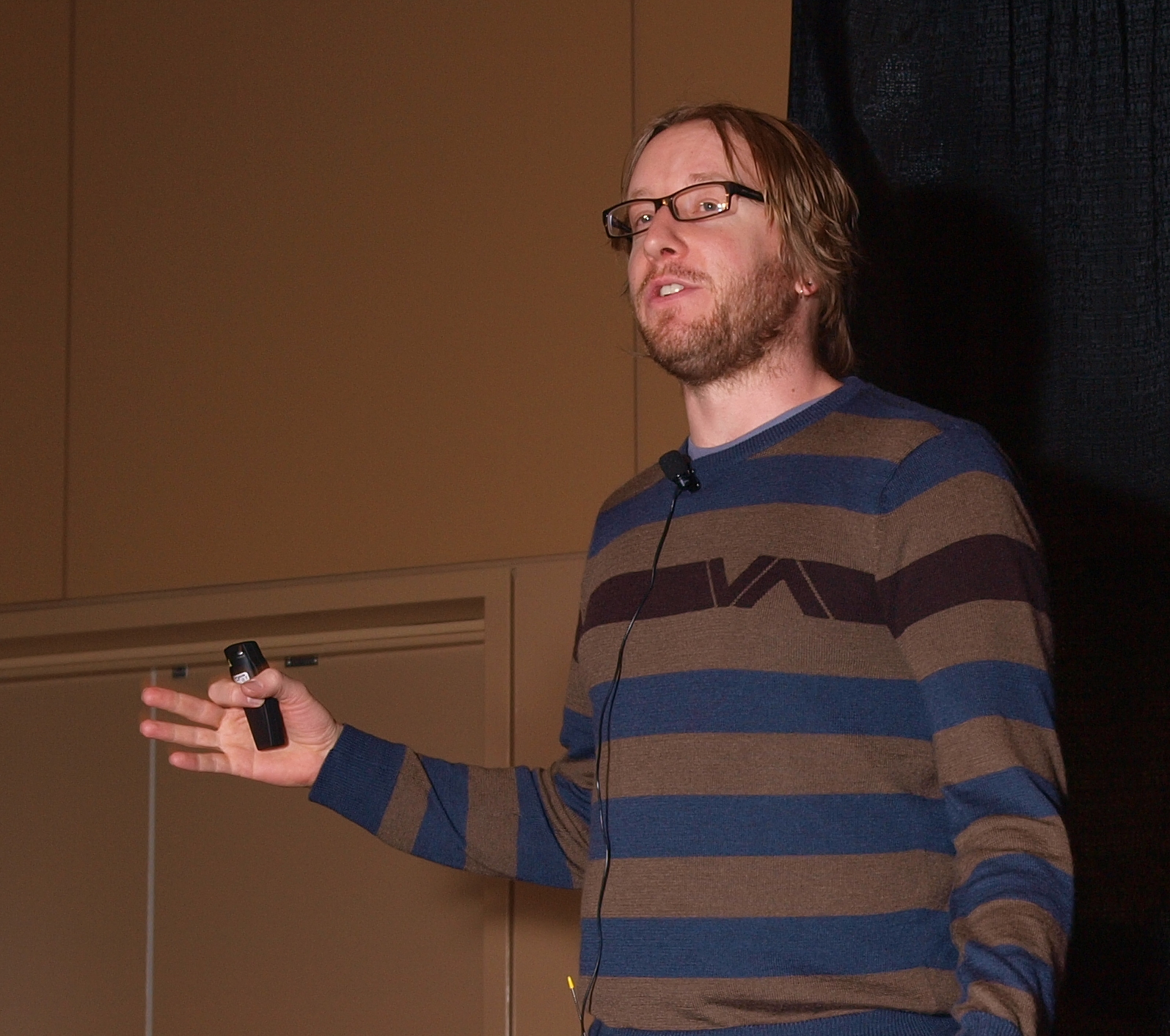
"Robbing the Cradle" was based on a theory of interactive horror design created by Randy Smith.

Smith's goal with "Robbing the Cradle" was to create the scariest level ever to appear in a game, which would "knock 'Return to the Cathedral' off the charts". Designer Jordan Thomas joined the Deadly Shadows team in November 2001, in part because of his interest in horror design. Smith worked with Thomas during the early planning of "Robbing the Cradle", which was referred to at Ion Storm as the "haunted house". Thomas explained that the key to their design was "dread", which he described as the feeling of being "seven steps from the unspeakable". Thomas drafted a level design based on this idea, while seeking to retain the stealth focus of other levels in Deadly Shadows. He saw "Robbing the Cradle" both as a level and as a test of the possibilities of interactive horror design. Smith later noted that his own biggest contributions were the level's beats: he designed ways for players' boundaries to be regularly violated, such as by forcing them to explore threatening areas. Thomas spent a large portion of his off-hours working on the level, and Smith stated that Thomas was responsible for "all of the implementation" of the level's theories.

The team worked to discover the causes and mechanics of fear, and they analyzed horror films for inspiration. "Robbing the Cradle" includes influences from the Silent Hill and System Shock series, from the films The Devil's Backbone, Jacob's Ladder, and Session 9, and from the books House of Leaves, From Hell, and The Shining. Thomas applied psychological horror techniques that he hoped would stay with the player even after the level's end. To generate fear, he used a combination of scripted sequences and unplanned, emergent factors. Every light source in the level dims and brightens at an imperceptibly slow speed, which Thomas hoped would create a "subconscious sense of breathing" and thereby make the Shalebridge Cradle feel like a living entity. Lights were programmed to flicker when approached by Puppets; however, Puppets roam the level in real-time, and so Thomas was unable to predict which lights would flicker at which times. He believed that this gave the player the feeling of being hunted.

Thomas explained that the Shalebridge Cradle's design was based on "dozens of actual, existing Victorian hospitals and reputedly haunted buildings". The Danvers State Hospital was a key influence, and Smith went with other members of the team to visit an abandoned asylum in Austin, Texas. Thomas gathered photographs by urban explorers and studied past methods of treating mental disorders, and he "read reams of patient and staff interviews". Audio director Eric Brosius composed the Cradle's soundscape, which Gillen later described as "a drunken miasma of sound [... that makes] you uneasy until an unexpected noise splits asunder".

== Reception and legacy ==
"Robbing the Cradle" was widely praised. It was the subject of a ten-page feature by Kieron Gillen in PC Gamer UK, the first and only article dedicated to a single level in that magazine. Gillen hailed it as "one of the most brilliant and disturbing levels ever committed to PC", and he believed that it was "probably the scariest level ever made". Tom McNamara of IGN wrote that the level "just has to be experienced to be believed", and he praised its sound design. He considered the level to be a high point of Deadly Shadows. GameSpot's Greg Kasavin called the level "remarkable" and "nerve-wracking", and IGN's Shunal Doke noted in a retrospective feature that the level's audiovisuals combine to "scare the living daylights out of you". In April 2013, the level was highlighted as "powerfully atmospheric" by Valve writer Marc Laidlaw.

Maximum PC included "Robbing the Cradle" in its list of the "Scariest Video Game Moments", with the magazine's Brittany Vincent noting that the level features "a frightful mixture of lobotomized patients, suffering spirits, and evil intentions". Bloody Disgusting placed the level fourth in its "The 15 Scariest Moments in Non-Horror Games", and its staff wrote that the level "managed to burn itself into our minds forever, as well as creep us the hell out." Writing for Official Xbox Magazine, Ryan McCaffery ranked Deadly Shadows fourth on his "My Top 5 Scariest Games of All-Time" list, based solely on "Robbing the Cradle". He considered the level to be "perhaps the single most brilliantly designed mission in a genius trilogy of games." In a reader poll conducted by The Daily Telegraph, Deadly Shadows tied as the twelfth scariest video game, in large part because of "Robbing the Cradle". The level led Computer & Video Games to place Deadly Shadows on its list "Fear Factor: The 12 Scariest Games Ever Made". The magazine's Iain Wilson wrote that the level is "considered one of the scariest levels ever created".

After finishing work on Deadly Shadows, Jordan Thomas went to Irrational Games, where he designed the "Fort Frolic" section of BioShock. He later became the creative director of BioShock 2. Because of tensions and disagreements within the Deadly Shadows team, Randy Smith was fired from Ion Storm near the end of the game's production, and he founded Tiger Style with fellow Deadly Shadows designer David Kalina. Smith later wondered if the team had "overdone it" with "Robbing the Cradle", and he stated, "I worry a little bit in retrospect about people who just wanted a 'sneaking around mansions and stealing stuff' experience [being] forced into their deepest nightmares." The positive reception of "Robbing the Cradle" inspired Eidos-Montréal to create a similar asylum level in 2014's Thief.
