= David Kalina =

American businessman

David Kalina is the co-founder and co-owner of the award-winning game studio Tiger Style. Kalina started Tiger Style with Randy Smith in 2009, and released the award-winning game Spider: The Secret of Bryce Manor, and most recently the Independent Games Festival nominated game Waking Mars.

Kalina is a games industry veteran, previously working on projects such as Tom Clancy's Splinter Cell, Deus Ex: Invisible War, and the Thief series. Kalina currently resides in Melbourne, Australia.

== Video games credits ==
- Waking Mars
- Spider: The Secret of Bryce Manor
- BlackSite: Area 51
- Area-51
- Thief: Deadly Shadows
- Deus Ex: Invisible War
- Tom Clancy's Splinter Cell
- Subnautica: Below Zero
