= Manic Expressive =

Studio album by Her Space Holiday
- Released: 2001
- Genre: Indie-Electronica
- Length: 42:01
- Label: Tiger Style (US); Galaxia Records (US vinyl); Wichita Recordings (UK)
- Producer: Marc Bianchi

Her Space Holiday chronology
Ambidextrous (2001)	Manic Expressive (2001)	The Young Machines (2003)

Professional ratings
Aggregate scores
Source	Rating
Metacritic	65/100 link
Review scores
Source	Rating
Allmusic	link
Rock Sound	2.5/5 stars

Manic Expressive is the first full-length album by Her Space Holiday.

== Track listing ==
1. Manic Expressive (Enter)
2. Lydia
3. The Ringing in My Ears
4. Polar Opposite
5. Key Stroke
6. Spectator Sport
7. Hassle Free Harmony
8. Perfect on Paper
9. Manic Expressive (Exit)
