= Vampire: The Masquerade – Bloodlines =

2004 action role-playing video game

- Cover art depicting the vampire Jeanette Voerman
- Developer: Troika Games
- Publisher: Activision
- Directors: Jason D. Anderson; Leonard Boyarsky
- Producers: Tom Decker; David Mullich
- Designers: Brian Mitsoda; Chad Moore; TJ Perillo; Jason D. Anderson; Leonard Boyarsky
- Programmer: Andrew Meggs
- Writers: Brian Mitsoda; Chad Moore; TJ Perillo; Jason D. Anderson; Leonard Boyarsky
- Composer: Rik Schaffer
- Series: Vampire: The Masquerade
- Engine: Source
- Platform: Microsoft Windows
- Release: NA: November 16, 2004; EU: November 19, 2004
- Genre: Action role-playing
- Mode: Single-player

Vampire: The Masquerade – Bloodlines is a 2004 action role-playing video game developed by Troika Games and published by Activision for Microsoft Windows. Set in White Wolf Publishing's World of Darkness, the game is based on White Wolf's role-playing game Vampire: The Masquerade and follows a human who is killed and revived as a fledgling vampire. The game depicts the fledgling's journey through early 21st-century Los Angeles to uncover the truth behind a recently discovered relic that heralds the end of all vampires.

Bloodlines is presented from first-person and third-person perspectives. The player assigns their character to one of several vampire clans—each with unique powers—customizes their combat and dialog abilities, and progresses through Bloodlines using violent and nonviolent methods. The selection of clan affects how the player is perceived in the game world and which powers and abilities they possess; this opens up different avenues of exploration and methods of interacting with or manipulating other characters. The player can complete side missions away from the primary storyline by moving freely between the available hubs: Santa Monica, Hollywood, downtown Los Angeles, and Chinatown.

Troika's 32-member team began developing Bloodlines in November 2001 as an indirect sequel to the previous year's Vampire: The Masquerade – Redemption. Troika used Valve's Source game engine, then in development, which was used for Valve's own Half-Life 2. The game's production was turbulent, as the design's scope exceeded the available resources, and the team was left without a producer for nearly a year until Activision appointed David Mullich to the role, where he found designs and levels unfinished or abandoned. After three years in development with no end in sight and running over budget, Activision set a strict deadline for completion, and Bloodlines was released incomplete in November 2004.

Released in competition with Half-Life 2 and several other titles, Bloodlines sold fewer than 80,000 copies during its initial release, which was considered a poor performance. It received generally positive reviews from contemporary critics, who praised the game's writing and the scale of choice, although they criticized its technical flaws. It was Troika Games's last production before its failure in early 2005, when it could not secure additional projects. The game has a cult following as a rarely replicated example of gameplay and narrative, and modern reception recognizes it as a flawed masterpiece. Since its original release, Bloodlines received post-release support from fans, supplying unofficial fixes and re-adding unused content. A sequel, Vampire: The Masquerade – Bloodlines 2, was released in 2025.

== Gameplay ==
Bloodlines is an action role-playing video game optionally presented from the first- or third-person perspective. Before the game begins, players create a male or female vampire character by selecting a vampire clan and configuring available points in three areas—Attributes, Abilities, and Disciplines (vampiric powers)—or by answering questions, which create a character for the player. The player can select one of seven vampire clans: the powerful Brujah, the decadent Toreador, the insane Malkavian, the aristocratic Ventrue, the monstrously deformed Nosferatu, the blood-magic-wielding Tremere, or the animalistic Gangrel.

The player builds their character by spending acquired points to increase their ratings in the three areas. The points spent on Attributes and Abilities combine to determine a player's success or effectiveness in performing tasks such as using firearms, brawling, and lock-picking; for example, determining how accurate or how far the player can shoot or if they can hack a computer. Attributes are represented by physical (strength, dexterity, and stamina), social (charisma, manipulation, and appearance), and mental (perception, intelligence, and wits). Abilities are talents (such as brawling and dodging), skills (such as firearms and melee), and knowledge (such as computers and investigation). The player is initially assigned points to spend in the three areas, with the amount they can spend determined by clan; for example, the Brujah can spend the most points on physical and skill attributes. During character creation, each upgrade costs one point. The upgrade cost increases as the game progresses. Each ability can be raised from zero to five, and it is impossible to accrue enough experience points to complete every skill (allowing the player to specialize or balance their character). Experience points are gained by completing quests, finding items, or unlocking secret paths rather than killing enemies and are used to increase or unlock the character's statistics and abilities. The game features a main story and optional side quests that can be completed at any time; the player can move between the available areas at will to revisit locations, characters, or merchants.

The player's clan affects their skills and powers. Although the attractive Toreadors receive bonuses for seduction and persuasion, opening additional dialogue options, they are physically weak; the Nosferatu are forced to travel in the shadows or through sewers to avoid alerting humans but receive bonuses to their intelligence and computer skills, which enables access to more information. The Malkavians have different dialogue options, reflecting their inherent insanity. Upgrading some skills provides additional dialogue options; attractive and charismatic characters seduce to get their way, aggressive characters threaten, and others persuade their targets to cooperate.

From the third-person perspective, a Malkavian wields a melee weapon. The interface shows character health and weapon on the left, with available blood and Disciplines on the right.

Ranged combat is first-person, with character points assigned to the firearms skill determining the shot's accuracy and how long it takes to target an opponent. Melee combat is third-person, with access to weapons such as katanas and sledgehammers for melee combat, or pistols, crossbows, and flamethrowers for firearm combat. If a player sneaks up on an opponent, they can perform an instant kill; weapons provide unique instant kill animations. The player can block attacks manually or automatically by leaving their character idle. They can use stealth in missions by sneaking past guards and security cameras, picking locks, and hacking computers to locate alternative routes.

Each clan has specific Disciplines, which can be used in combat and to create approaches to quests. Although some powers overlap clans, no two clans share the same three Disciplines. More physical vampires can enhance themselves to become fast and lethal killers or summon spirit allies to attack their foes; others can mentally dominate their targets to force their cooperation or render themselves invisible to hide from detection; and others can boil their opponent's blood from afar. The ability Blood Buff (which temporarily upgrades physical abilities) is common to all vampires. Several abilities can be active at the same time. Blood is a primary currency in Bloodlines, used to activate Disciplines and abilities. It is drained with each use and can be replenished by drinking from rats, visiting blood banks, or drinking from humans by attacking or seducing them; the player can feed on enemies during combat. Drinking from innocents for too long can kill them, costing a character humanity points.

Players are penalized for using certain vampiric abilities in front of witnesses; exposing their existence loses masquerade points, although additional masquerade points can be earned from quests and other actions. Violating the masquerade five times draws the ire of vampire hunters and loses the game. The player has humanity points, representing the vampire's humanity. Some actions cost humanity points; a low humanity score alters available dialogue options to become more aggressive and increases the chance of entering a frenzied state and embarking on a killing spree when the vampire's blood is low. A large amount of damage can also trigger this frenzy. Like masquerade points, losing all humanity points ends the game, with the vampire becoming a mindless beast. Some areas, known as Elysium, prevent the use of Disciplines or weapons. Players can recruit a ghoul, Heather, as a customizable servant who gives them blood, gifts, and money.

== Synopsis ==
=== Setting ===
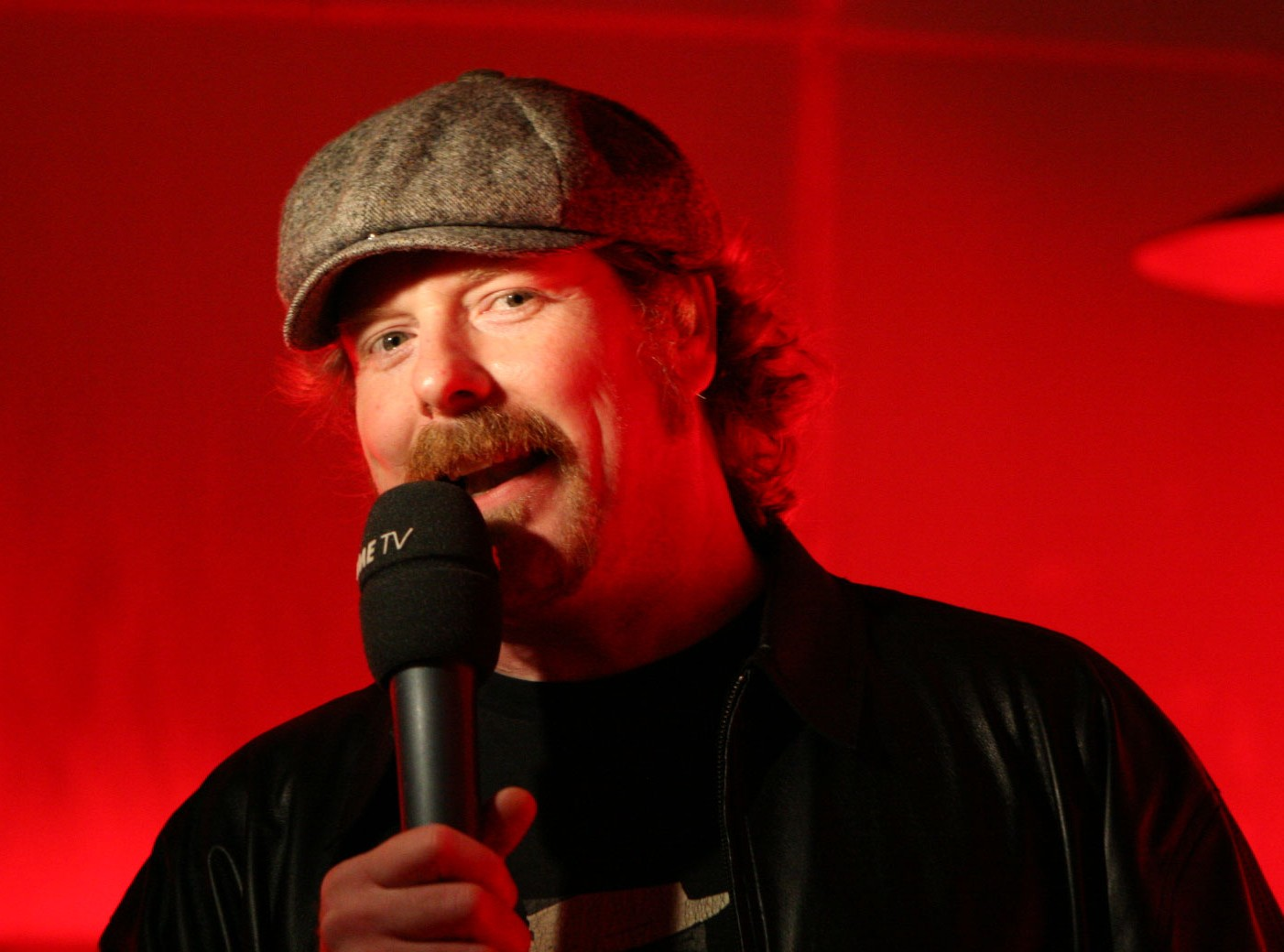
John DiMaggio (pictured in 2008) voiced the Anarch vampire Smiling Jack.

Vampire: The Masquerade – Bloodlines takes place in four areas of 21st-century Los Angeles: Santa Monica, Hollywood, Downtown Los Angeles, and Chinatown. Set in the World of Darkness, the game depicts a world in which vampires, werewolves, demons, and other creatures shape human history. A code binds the vampires to maintain their secrecy (forbidding the use of vampiric abilities in front of humans) and avoid unnecessary killing (to preserve the vampire's last shreds of humanity). The vampires are divided into seven clans of the Camarilla, the vampire government, with distinctive traits and abilities. The Toreadors are the closest to humanity, with a passion for culture; the Ventrue are noble, powerful leaders; the Brujah are idealists who excel at fighting; the Malkavians are cursed with insanity or blessed with insight; the Gangrel are loners, in sync with their animalistic nature; the secretive, untrustworthy Tremere wield blood magic; and the monstrous Nosferatu are condemned to a life in the shadows to avoid humanity. The clans are loosely united by their belief in the Camarilla's goals and opposition to the Sabbat: vampires who revel in their nature, embracing the beast within. The Anarch Movement is a faction of idealistic vampires opposed to the Camarilla's political structure, believing that all vampires should share power.

The main character of Bloodlines, whom the player controls, is an unnamed fledgling vampire who is transformed at the start of the game and belongs to one of the clans. The fledgling is employed by Sebastian LaCroix (voiced by Andy Milder), prince of Los Angeles's vampires. The fledgling's travels through the vampire world bring them into contact with other undead creatures such as the deformed information broker Bertram Tung, the anarch Smiling Jack (John DiMaggio), and the dissociative Voerman sisters, Jeanette and Therese. Chinatown is controlled by the Kuei-Jin, Asian vampires led by Ming-Xiao, who do not require blood and consider themselves superior to other vampires.

=== Plot ===
The game begins with the player character, an unnamed human, being killed and resurrected as a fledgling vampire. The fledgling and their sire are brought before the Camarilla for this unauthorized act. The sire is executed by order of LaCroix; the fledgling is spared the same fate by the intervention of the anarch Nines Rodriguez and employed by the prince.

LaCroix sends the fledgling to Santa Monica to help his ghoul, Mercurio, destroy a Sabbat warehouse. Following their success, the fledgling travels to downtown Los Angeles, meeting separately with Nines, LaCroix, and Jack. LaCroix tasks the fledgling with investigating a docked ship, the Elizabeth Dane, for information about an Ankaran sarcophagus rumored to contain the body of an Antediluvian, one of the oldest and most powerful vampires. Their arrival would herald Gehenna, the vampire apocalypse. The fledgling discovers that the sarcophagus seems to have been opened from within.

Increased Sabbat activity coincides with the disappearance of the Malkavian chief, Alistair Grout. At Grout's mansion, the fledgling sees Nines leaving and discovers Grout's remains in the mansion with vampire hunter Grünfeld Bach, who denies involvement in Grout's death. Learning about Nines's presence at the mansion, LaCroix tells the other chiefs to approve Nines's execution. The fledgling is sent to the Museum of Natural History to recover the sarcophagus but finds that it has been stolen. Jack later suggests to the fledgling that LaCroix wants the sarcophagus to drink the blood of the ancient within, gaining its power.

Believing that Gary, the Nosferatu chief, has stolen the sarcophagus, the fledgling is sent to Hollywood to find him; after locating a captured Nosferatu for Gary, he reveals that the Giovanni vampire clan stole the sarcophagus. The fledgling infiltrates the Giovanni mansion and finds the sarcophagus guarded by the Kuei-Jin, who claim their leader, Ming-Xiao, has allied with LaCroix. The locked sarcophagus is returned to LaCroix's tower, and Beckett, a vampire scholar, tells the fledgling that the only person who can open it has been abducted by Bach to lure LaCroix. The fledgling kills Bach and learns that the sarcophagus's key has been stolen.

The fledgling returns to LaCroix, learning that the Sabbat tried to steal the sarcophagus to destroy it and prevent Gehenna, then kills the Sabbat leader to disperse his followers. The fledgling is met by Ming-Xiao, who offers an alliance. Ming-Xiao reveals that she has the key, and LaCroix killed Grout to prevent his powerful insight from unveiling LaCroix's plans; Ming-Xiao disguised herself as Nines at the mansion to frame him. Denying Ming-Xiao's claims, LaCroix rescinds the blood hunt on Nines and entrusts the fledgling with recruiting the anarchs to punish the Kuei-Jin for murdering Grout. The fledgling finds Nines hiding in Griffith Park, and they are then attacked by a werewolf, and Nines is badly injured. The fledgling escapes with Jack, who reveals that LaCroix has issued an execution order on the fledgling for framing Nines on Ming-Xiao's orders.

The ending varies depending on whom, if anyone, the fledgling chooses to support. If they side with LaCroix or Ming-Xiao, each sends the fledgling to eliminate the other: LaCroix opens the sarcophagus, triggering hidden explosives that kill both him and the fledgling; Ming-Xiao betrays the fledgling, chaining them to the sarcophagus and sinking it into the ocean. Supporting the anarchs—or choosing no allegiance—results in the fledgling killing Ming-Xiao and maiming LaCroix, who later dies when he opens the sarcophagus. If the fledgling opens the sarcophagus themselves, they are killed in the explosion. Supporting the Camarilla results in the fledgling killing Ming-Xiao, LaCroix is replaced by Tremere leader Maximillian Strauss, and the sarcophagus is placed into storage. Each ending where the sarcophagus is opened has Jack watching from afar with the mummy taken from the coffin, and the enigmatic taxi driver who transports the fledgling between locations says, "The blood of Caine controls our fate ... Farewell, vampire."

== Development ==
=== Conception ===
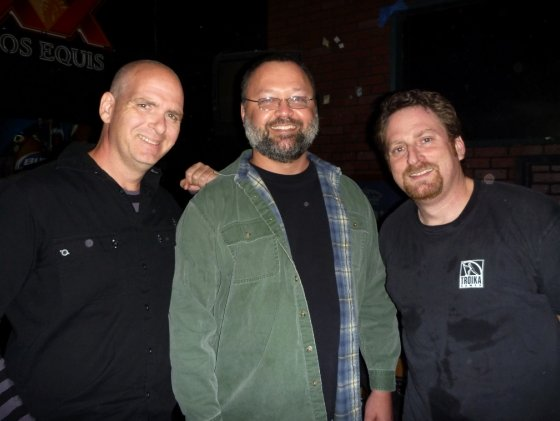
Troika Games co-founders Jason Anderson (L), Tim Cain (M), and Leonard Boyarsky

The development of Vampire: The Masquerade – Bloodlines began at Troika Games in November 2001. The developers wanted to put a role-playing game in a first-person setting, believing that the genre had become stale. Troika approached publisher Activision with its idea; Activision suggested using the Vampire: The Masquerade license used a year earlier in Nihilistic Software's Vampire: The Masquerade – Redemption, which had experienced sufficient success to merit a sequel. Instead of developing a sequel to Redemption, the development team researched the White Wolf property, including the game's rules and storylines. Troika was a small game studio with five developers and a total staff of thirty-two (including lead writer Brian Mitsoda, who joined the team less than a year after development began). Although some preliminary designs and levels were completed, much of the work was abandoned or redeveloped.

Troika wanted to make a 3D game but was uncertain whether to build a new game engine or license an existing one and whether to use first- or third-person. At that time, the Source game engine was being built by Valve. Valve employee Scott Lynch approached Troika about using the engine, and it was the first external team to use it. Troika chose Source for its facial animation and lip-synching system since it wanted players to speak to the characters face-to-face. Since the engine was in development with Bloodlines and Valve's own Half-Life 2, Troika was working with unfamiliar code and tools, forcing it to write code to compensate for the unfinished engine and with only a single source of technical support. Troika developed a lighting system to create distinctive, moody illumination for the nighttime setting, a particle system for the special effects accompanying the vampire Disciplines, and a cloth system for clothing flow. Source lacked its later artificial intelligence (AI) coding, and Troika's code worked poorly with the Source engine.

=== Writing ===
Many central plot elements existed before designer Brian Mitsoda's involvement: the prince, the anarchs being upset, aspects of the Gehenna storyline, and Jack and the sarcophagus as a major subplot. The designers broadly tied the overarching story into each hub and level. Each designer controlled their assigned section of the game and worked with a small team, enabling quick decision-making and ease in keeping plot elements consistent. Mitsoda became the primary writer for many of the characters and their quests, dialog, and side content in the game, such as emails, which helped retain a consistent narrative. He was given freedom with respect to the script, with no restrictions on language or content, and could rewrite characters when he thought his initial draft was weak. Although Troika developed the story, it is inspired by White Wolf's Time of Judgment novels about a vampire apocalypse. Bloodlines' story was accepted as canonical by White Wolf, with the game serving as a prequel to Time of Judgment and including characters from the White Wolf game, such as Jack. Discussing character design, Mitsoda said he tried to disguise the need for characters who point a player in an appropriate direction:

You need a character to pose a problem or give out a quest or be a barrier of some kind. I don't like to make the [character] outright say "I need you to do X, then I'll give you Y" ... – it makes the character into an automated quest kiosk. I like the characters to come off like people actually do – they don't say "hi" when strangers come knocking, they say "who the hell are you?" or they're expecting you and know more than they let on, or they don't care. I don't like my [characters] to be standing around as if their lives begin when the character starts talking to them and end when the player leaves.

Single-purpose characters needed a distinctive personality trait to quickly establish them with the player, rather than serving as a disposable item, while major characters had to reflect the player's progression and actions through the game. Mitsoda wrote the characters by thinking about whom each character was, assigning them motivations determining why they were where they were, what they thought about the player, and what they wanted from them. Following a suggestion by fellow writer Chad Moore, the Malkavian player character has a dialogue script distinct from that of the other six clans; Mitsoda said it was one of the simpler aspects of the development cycle. He wrote the Malkavian script last, with time running out on development, and the overwork and lack of sleep contributed to what Mitsoda considered an unhealthy state of mind, ideal for writing insane dialogue. He wanted to highlight their madness without making it comical. Since the story is set during the Camarilla's takeover of Los Angeles, the team simplified the plot by only allowing the player to belong to one of the LA-based clans.

=== Design ===
Bloodlines underwent many modifications during its three-year development. (above) The original character model of Jeanette in a Hollywood club; (below) the final model in a Santa Monica club.

Troika co-founder Jason Anderson's research on Vampire: The Masquerade source material and fansites found that the game's main attraction was character interaction and involvement in the vampire societies, not statistics and powers. Troika tried to remain faithful to the pen-and-paper role-playing game, hoping not to alienate the game's fans, but rules designed for multiple players did not translate well to single-player computer game design. The team attempted to discover which elements could work equally well in pen-and-paper and computer games. However, although much of the character system and attributes were translated, not all the attributes (such as "knowledge of law") made sense in the computer game. Of 30 pen-and-paper abilities, 15 reached the final design.

Another difficult area was feats. Although common feats worked well, with a random chance of success or failure, uncommon ones would appear to fail more often. To avoid this, randomization was replaced by a degree of difficulty in accomplishing the feat. Although pen-and-paper falling damage is random, the computer game bases damage on the distance of the fall. The team's biggest challenge was adapting disciplines. The pen-and-paper version may require a little blood that requires a long time to use or have no blood cost and can be used at will; upgraded disciplines had additional requirements considered too confusing for a computer game. Troika attempted to equalize the disciplines, keeping the effect intact and normalizing the cost, so a first-level power requires one blood point, a second-level two points, and so on. To balance the clans, the aristocratic Ventrue were only allowed to feed on noble blood, though this was changed to allow them to feed on lower-class humans, receiving less blood. During character creation, the game had an optional character biography with unique positive and negative characteristics (increasing one ability while limiting another). This was removed from the released game; Activision felt there was insufficient test time, and removing it was a more stable option.

The team's previous experience was with turn-based combat games, and it struggled to develop a real-time combat system affected by customizable attributes and abilities that provided feedback to the player on how those statistics affected the battle. It initially found that by adhering too closely to the White Wolf source material rules for guns, where the effectiveness of a shot is determined in a contest between the player's skill and the opponent's defense, the firearms seemed broken; the player would not hit where they aimed. Troika found it difficult to mesh the available factors in a real-time setting. Melee combat had to deal with various melee weapons and animations and adjust for melee-on-melee and melee-on-ranged combat.

Troika used first-person perspective to immerse the player in the setting, interacting face-to-face with the characters and seeing their facial reactions to the player. It chose to follow a single character to aid the immersion, creating the isolation of a vampire unable to trust any other character. This aided the story and compensated for the technical issues of allowing multiple player characters.

Choice is a significant aspect of the game, requiring a non-linear design to accommodate the customized characters. Level design began with a list of factors such as Disciplines, stealth, and feats. Each area had to be viable for a shooting character (sufficient ammunition), a discipline-focused character (sufficient blood sources to keep the powers fueled), and a melee specialist (to reach enemies without being killed), with stealth options and option combinations. Level design began with a focus on stealth, considering the positioning of guards and the character's potential stealth capability at that point in the game. Then direct, combat-heavy, and dialogue paths were added. The amusement arcade area was to feature playable versions of Activision arcade games such as Pitfall!, though the idea was abandoned due to time constraints.

Director Leonard Boyarsky considered the animation system important in the team's choice of the Source engine. The integrated "faceposer" tool allowed Troika to customize facial animations, expressions, gestures, and lip-synching, eliminating the need to explain what a character was doing. Every non-player character required a voiceover, which helped Troika define its characters more quickly. The engine had a physics system permitting new features, such as monsters hurling corpses at the player or dying characters realistically crumbling into pieces, instead of requiring pre-built animations. Although Troika had ignored first-person engines due to technical limitations, such as a low polygon count and limited texture memory, as the technology improved, it thought it could create a real-time action game without sacrificing the immersion and story of a role-playing game.

Describing the choice of developing a game based on the existing White Wolf property over creating their own, Boyarsky said that although an original property lacked the constraints of an existing one, the downside was that it had not been tested and could be rejected by its potential audience; an existing property was proven. Troika tried to stay as close as possible to the White Wolf rules while reducing the number of abilities and disciplines to those relevant to Bloodlines gameplay.

=== Later development ===
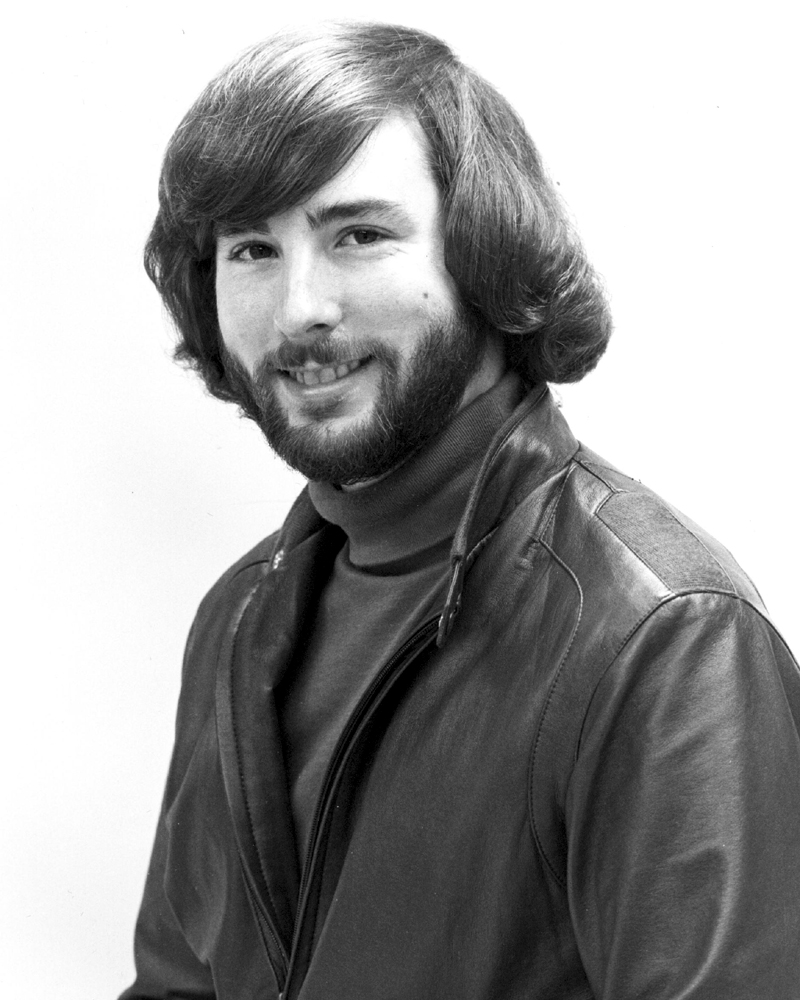
Video game producer David Mullich was assigned to the team over a year after development had begun.

Activision introduced the game in May 2003, but in October, Valve experienced a security breach in which hackers stole the source code for Half-Life 2. The breach required new security implementations for the engine, delaying both games; the release of Bloodlines was postponed until early 2005. Until May 2004, Troika and Activision said that the game would feature a multiplayer component and modes, including a team of vampires against a team of vampire hunters, with the ability to upgrade characters between rounds. The team was left without a producer by Activision for over a year before David Mullich was assigned to the project. With no producer oversight, Mullich found the game's design incomplete, game levels created and abandoned, and several technical issues, including problems with code for the proposed multiplayer option. The Source multiplayer code was in its infancy, increasing its development time, and the idea was abandoned.

In addition to problems with the Source engine, the designers found that the game's scope exceeded their resources. Bloodlines has several playstyles, requiring different interfaces, animations, and artificial intelligence for stealth, melee combat, and first- or third-person capability. Compared to contemporary first-person shooters, with 10 to 20 animated character models, Bloodlines had over 150 characters with 3,000 unique animations, in addition to boss characters, with their movement styles. The designers underestimated the time required to develop and improve these systems. The game's scope suffered from content not being removed when necessary; other components would be endlessly refined without being finalized, preventing the developers from focusing on other parts of the game system. All content additionally required approval by White Wolf and Activision.

After three years of development, the game was progressing slowly, and it was unknown when it would be finished. Activision set a series of deadlines for the project's development to ensure Troika had sufficient time to effectively test the game, though these milestones were repeatedly extended, and Bloodlines eventually ran over budget. In 2003 Activision intervened, ordering that the game be ready for release in the next few months and even advancing more money to Troika to complete its work on The Temple of Elemental Evil for Atari, freeing the Troika team to work on Bloodlines exclusively. Activision eventually issued an ultimatum that the project be finished within months, on September 15, 2004. Troika delivered a version of Bloodlines on the required date; due to its scale, the game underwent three weeks of testing. Activision decided that the game was suitable for release but was contractually bound to withhold Bloodlines until after the debut of Half-Life 2 in November 2004. Troika convinced Activision to use the delay to fund further development; the additional budget was insufficient to pay all of Troika's staff, and some employees worked unpaid to complete the project. This version underwent another three weeks of testing to become the final release code; the game was still unfinished when Activision forced its release. Bloodlines' creative director Jason Anderson blamed Activision, saying that the publisher took the game from Troika without providing enough time to test and polish it. Conversely, Boyarsky defended Activision for supporting Troika as the project exceeded its budget and schedule. During the nearly four years of development, Anderson estimated that the team worked overtime for all but two months.

=== Music ===
The game's original score was composed and produced by Rik Schaffer. Troika licensed many songs for the game, and posters for real bands are featured on the walls of the game's clubs. The soundtrack was released as a limited edition CD to customers who pre-ordered the game through Best Buy. It features nine tracks by artists including Daniel Ash, Chiasm, Tiamat, Darling Violetta, Genitorturers, and Lacuna Coil. "Bloodlines", performed by Al Jourgensen and Ministry, was composed and performed specifically for the game. Activision chose the licensed tracks without input from Troika. The song "Angel" by Massive Attack was used as a placeholder on the game's menu screen. Troika could not obtain the rights to use the song in the finished game and tasked Schaffer with creating something similar.

== Release ==
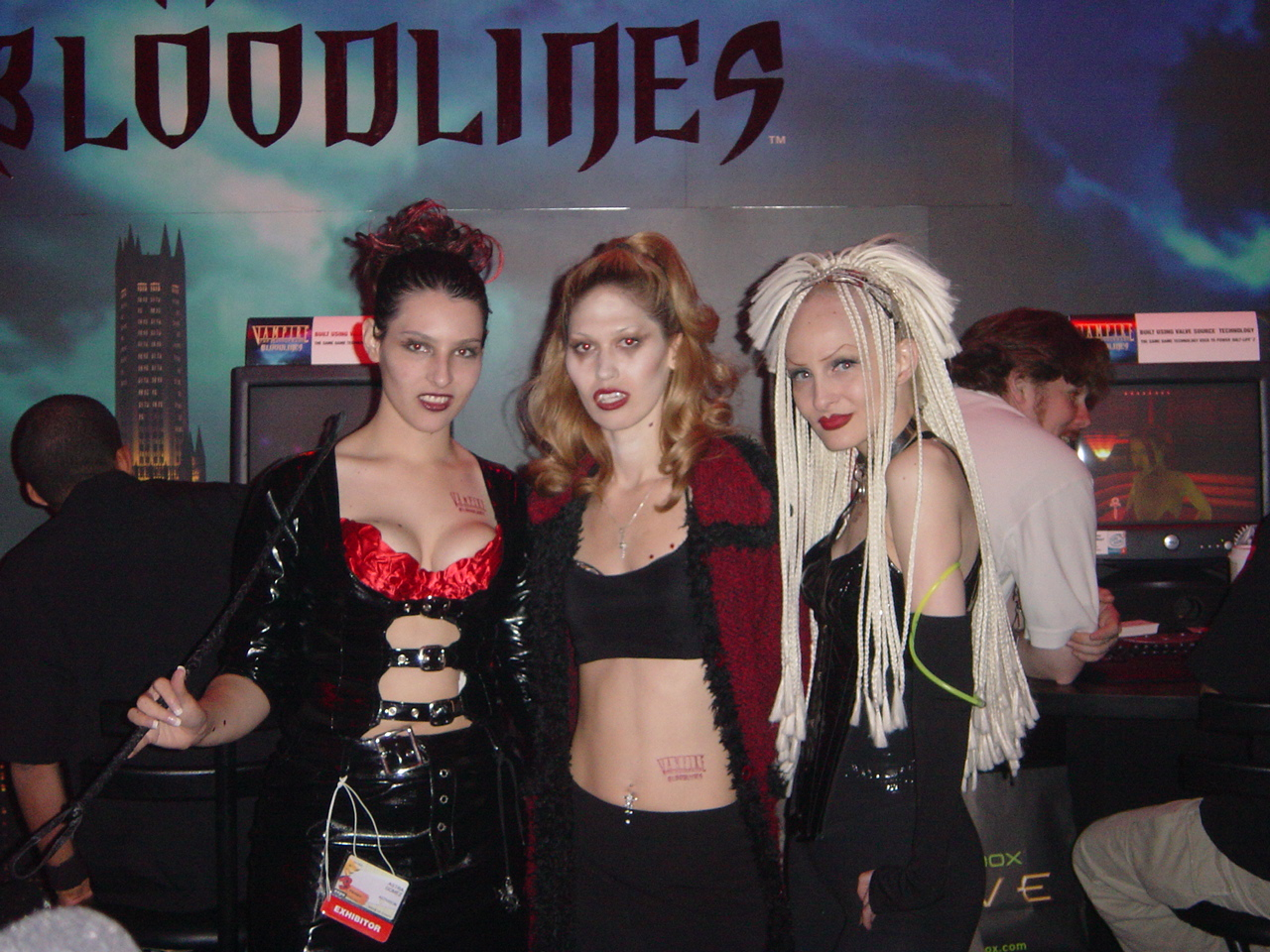
Promotional models for the game at E3 2003, dressed as vampires

Vampire: The Masquerade – Bloodlines was released on November 16, 2004, in competition with Half-Life 2, Metal Gear Solid 3: Snake Eater, Halo 2, and several other titles. Valve's contract for Troika's use of the Source engine guaranteed that Bloodlines could not be released before Half-Life 2 and could not be introduced to the public until after the announcement of Half-Life 2, over eighteen months after development began. In February 2004, the game was scheduled for release in spring 2005, partially to avoid competing with Half-Life 2 and the competitive Christmas period, before Activision moved the date to November 2004. Activision obtained model Erin Layne to play Jeanette in promotional material for the game. Layne worked with Bloodlines artist Tim Bradstreet for a day to provide the poses chosen by Activision to represent Jeanette in the game's posters, clothing, and other items.

Despite generally favorable reviews, Bloodlines' initial release sold 72,000 copies and earned approximately US$3.4 million in sales, below Troika's other games, Arcanum: Of Steamworks and Magick Obscura (234,000 units, $8.8 million) and The Temple of Elemental Evil (128,000 units, $5.2 million). In comparison, Bloodlines' release competitor Half-Life 2 had sold 6.5 million copies by 2008. Bloodlines‍' relative failure contributed to the demise of Troika Games.

Shortly after its debut, most development staff were laid off; the remaining staff tried to patch Bloodlines and develop game concepts to secure funding to keep Troika in business. Troika, unable to obtain further funding from Activision or other publishers, released its employees in two waves: the first in November 2004, followed by the remaining staff in December, except for its three founders, Anderson, Boyarsky, and Tim Cain. Some employees worked without pay to fix the game. When the company closed in February 2005, it had secured no other game development deals. That month, Boyarsky confirmed that Troika had not been working on a patch for the game since most of its staff had been gone since December 2004.

In a 2006 interview, Anderson said that although Troika Games's library had been critically well received, consistent technical issues had marred the perception of the company's games, contributing to Troika's difficulty in obtaining new projects. In 2013, Mitsoda said that Bloodlines was released at "the worst possible time - most people didn't even know we were out ... fans and the Troika [developers] are always going to wonder what the game could have been like with another six months." In a 2017 interview, Boyarsky echoed Mitsoda's sentiments, saying that a further three to six months of development time could have allowed Troika to address many technical flaws, but he was unsure that they could have resolved larger issues. He said, "I feel the second half of the game isn't as good as the first. I feel like we devolved into relying too much on combat at the end." Boyarsky noted that it was impossible to know if the fixes would have made Bloodlines more successful or if it would have remained a niche product. He said, "it might have been too early for people to appreciate it, but we'll never know."

=== Post-release ===
The game's fans have created unofficial patches to address Bloodlines' technical problems and restore missing and incomplete content. After experiencing problems with the first versions of an unofficial patch created by Dan Upright, analytical chemist Werner Spahl continued patching the game from version 1.2 with permission and instructions. The game community tested Spahl's patches, providing reports on bugs and spelling errors. Although the game's complexity meant that repairing one aspect often broke another, as work on the patches progressed, Spahl began restoring removed and incomplete content in the game files, adding quests, items, weapons, and characters, with fan help to provide voice acting, models, and reinstating whole levels. Spahl contacted former Troika staff for insight into their intentions for cut content. A library area, for example, was restored after Mitsoda told Spahl only that "it was somehow connected to a main character and a Sabbat boss, and was meant to look like the real-world [Los Angeles] library." A fan traveled to the real library to gather notes on its layout and co-developed the in-game area with Spahl. Schaffer also provided Spahl with unreleased scores from the game. The changes altered the original game so much that some of the game's fans criticized Spahl. This resulted in two patch versions: a basic version, fixing the game's technical issues, and a "plus" version with the additional content. As of 2019, the game has over 15 years of post-release support. The patches are also included in the game version sold on the GOG.com distribution service.

Boyarsky voiced his support for unofficial patches, saying, "they've found the stuff that we hoped people would find about the game, in terms of the different paths you can take and how it played differently for every class." Boyarsky said that while he would have preferred that the game was more successful at launch, that people were still playing and modifying it made Troika's efforts feel more "worthwhile".

Schaffer released a remastered version of his score through Milan Records in October 2019, including eight previously unreleased tracks. The score could be purchased on compact disc, digital download, and a blood-red vinyl record version with a marbled, black smoke effect housed in a custom sleeve.

== Reception ==
Reception

Aggregate score
Aggregator	Score
Metacritic	80/100

Review scores
Publication	Score
AllGame	3.5/5
Eurogamer	7/10
GameSpot	7.7/10
GameSpy	4/5
IGN	8.4/10
PC Gamer (US)	77%
PC Zone	8.6/10
VideoGamer.com	8/10

Vampire: The Masquerade – Bloodlines received a polarized, but ultimately positive response, with reviewers praising its writing and presentation and criticizing its technical problems. The aggregating review website Metacritic provides a score of 80 out of 100 (indicating "Generally Favorable" based on 61 reviews).

The game has been called a flawed masterpiece by critics. The scale and variety of choice and effect was highlighted by reviewers as Bloodlines' greatest success, including the variety of clans, with specific dialogue options, and the specific reactions from other characters, each with their own clan loyalty and bias. GameSpy called it a nearly flawless classic role-playing game; The New York Times described it as brilliant but unfinished. Eurogamer praised its "effortlessly intelligent" script, saying that "no other game has come close. Nothing's even tried". VideoGamer.com opined that at its best, Bloodlines stands among the greatest RPGs of the preceding five years, although its technical problems should be remembered. According to HonestGamers, the game "may not be polished and may end with a sigh instead of a shout, but for its ambition alone it deserves stream after stream of compliments." Reviewers compared it to other successful role-playing games, including Fallout, Baldur's Gate, The Elder Scrolls III: Morrowind, Star Wars: Knights of the Old Republic, and Deus Ex; Eurogamer described Bloodlines as Deus Ex with vampires.

IGN appreciated Bloodlines' rewarding exploration outside the main story, and The New York Times and GameSpy praised its "wonderfully imaginative" missions. Reviewers noted that later parts of the game were disappointing, delivering repetitive combat-focused missions with regenerating enemies, abandoning dialogue and stealth and punishing players who build characters with more social skills than combat abilities. GameSpy said that it had never seen a role-playing game so affected by player actions with everything, from clan choice and character build to actions in missions, influencing future options and dialogue.

Its writing was consistently praised by reviewers. The narrative was considered deep, successfully using White Wolf's Vampire: The Masquerade content. Eurogamer said that it had the best script the website had ever seen in a video game, and others described it as a superbly crafted tale of conspiracies, underworld subterfuge, fun and intrigue. Reviewers appreciated the use of adult themes, such as sex and death, in the storyline of a contemporary video game, which no other games had tackled with similar effectiveness. The mature themes succeeded without being gratuitous or exploitative, and were explored honestly and intelligently by a knowledgeable writer. The game's characters were praised for their memorable, developed personalities, with most major characters possessing their own backstory and presented as living people instead of ciphers. Its ending had a mixed response, with some reviewers appreciating their ability to choose one of the game's four endings (adding an incentive to replay the game) and others considering the ending anticlimactic.

GameSpot and GameSpy called the dialogue sharply written, with many memorable lines. Eurogamer noted that the characters' frequent use of vulgar language worked; written as real people, such language fit their character rather than giving the game an adult veneer. The website appreciated the breadth of dialogue options, allowing the player greater control of how to play their character. PC Zone opined that the quantity of well-written dialogue did not guarantee quality; many player choices seemed to have little effect on a conversation's outcome, and the best response was often the most obvious. The voice acting was repeatedly praised for the actors' quality and the amount of voice work, due to the many dialogue options.

Much of Bloodlines' criticism focused on technical problems when it was released, undermining the game experience or making it unplayable. Several reviewers noted errors which closed the game and typographical errors in on-screen text. Others cited frequent, sometimes-lengthy load times encountered while moving between hubs and entering or exiting buildings and areas. GameSpot called the game's artificial intelligence poor, often causing enemies to rush at an armed player, fire at them from too great a distance to be effective or become immobilized while waiting for the player's next attack. IGN noted that stealth broke the AI, allowing traps to be triggered and leaving the assailants standing still, unable to locate a hidden player. GameSpy said that the Source engine was Bloodlines' greatest weakness; although the RPG aspects were the game's strong suit, Source's core features, such as first-person shooting, were where it stumbled.

The combat was also criticized. Reviewers called it poor, clumsy and unsatisfactory, complaining that Bloodlines favors melee combat; firearms were weak, unwieldy and slow, even for characters specializing in guns. PC Zone, however, called the first-person shooting entertaining and challenging. Although melee combat was criticized as sluggish and difficult due to enemy attacks interrupting the player's, reviewers considered it overpowered; according to GameSpot, a boss character was killed with melee weapons on a first attempt after the repeated failure to do so with a gun. The New York Times found the unavoidable combat in the last part of the game to be so difficult that they had to cheat to succeed. Stealth was criticized, with IGN noting that even with low stealth skill it was possible to sneak around many enemies and feed from a guard without alerting another guard next to them. GameSpot opined that some of the best missions were stealth-based, as combat was more straightforward.

=== Accolades ===
In 2004, IGN named Bloodlines the Best PC RPG of that year and GameSpy called the "Ocean House Hotel" quest the Level of the Year. In 2005, Computer Gaming World called it the Role Playing Game of 2004, saying that it offered "a deep, balanced character creation system, a truckload of interesting quests, a good story and great NPCs to interact with." Computer Games Magazine nominated Bloodlines for its 2004 "Best Writing" award; the award went to Half-Life 2. During the 8th Annual Interactive Achievement Awards, the Academy of Interactive Arts & Sciences nominated Bloodlines for "Computer Role-Playing Game of the Year".

== Legacy ==
=== Modern reception ===
Bloodlines is considered a cult classic. Retrospective critiques continue to praise the game's narrative and degree of choice. In 2009, an article in Rock, Paper, Shotgun declared: "The sense of sorrow comes from the realization that there's nothing like [Bloodlines] on the horizon ... why should there be so few games like this? Oh right, because it's so very hard to do ... the lack of games comparable to Bloodlines is one of the great tragedies of our time." Eurogamer called the game inspirational, with an unmatched level of narrative detail. In 2010, The Escapist called Bloodlines a flawed masterpiece which could have been a genuine masterpiece with more time, money, and staff; although great games may inspire awe, it instead created a devoted fan base which continued to develop the game.

In 2006, PC Zone listed Bloodlines the seventh-best PC game which people were unlikely to have played, calling it the "best buggy game ever released". In 2007, the game was 80th on Computer & Video Games' list of its top 100 games, and 86th on PC Gamer's 2014 list of the same; it also appeared in PC Gamer's 2015 edition (moving to 63rd), 2017 edition (moving to 42nd), and 2021 edition (moving to 93rd). In 2008, bit-tech listed Jeanette as the second-best non-player video game character. In 2011, Rock, Paper, Shotgun called Bloodlines one of the most important PC games of all time ("it signposts a direction to a future of games that we were denied"), listing it as one of the 122 Best PC Games Ever. Cinema Blend called it one of the most underappreciated games of the decade. In 2011, Official Xbox Magazine called it one of the ten PC franchises it wanted on the Xbox 360 console. In 2013, PC Gamer named it one of the 100 Best Horror Games on PC, and PCGamesN called it the seventh-best PC role-playing game. In 2014, Bloodlines was 90th in Empire's readers' poll of the 100 Greatest Video Games of All Time, and Maximum PC chose it as one of the games they wanted to be remastered for contemporary game systems.

In 2015, Rock, Paper, Shotgun listed Bloodlines as the PC's 19th Best RPG and 15th Best Horror Game. In 2017, the game was listed 42nd on IGN's list of the Top 100 RPGs of all Time, Den of Geek named it one of the 20 Video Games that Deserve Remakes, and PC Gamer named it one of the best role-playing games of all time. In 2018, USGamer named it the 22nd best RPG of All Time, summarising that "for all of its bugs and questionable gameplay choices... the raw strength of its design still has the power to grab fans." PC Gamer highlighted the haunted "Ocean House Hotel" as a "high point of unexpected horror", comparing it to the Shalebridge Cradle level from Thief: Deadly Shadows (2004) and Ravenholm from Half-Life 2 (2004). In 2020, Rock, Paper, Shotgun named it the 44th-best RPG for PC.

=== Sequel ===
In a November 2004 interview, Boyarsky said that although the team would like to pursue a Bloodlines sequel, the decision was Activision's. Before their closure, Troika had begun development of a workable prototype based on another of White Wolf's tabletop role-playing games, Werewolf: The Apocalypse, set in the same universe as Vampire: The Masquerade. According to Boyarsky, the prototype was one small area built using assets taken from Bloodlines, and allowed the player to play as a werewolf, or a human capable of turning into one.

Paradox Interactive obtained the rights to Bloodlines in 2015, following their purchase of White Wolf. Paradox CEO Fredrik Wester confirmed that a sequel was possible, stating "when the time is right I guess a sequel will find its place in the market." Vampire: The Masquerade – Bloodlines 2 was announced in March 2019. Initially developed by Seattle-based Hardsuit Labs, the game was to be written by Bloodlines's lead-writer Brian Mitsoda, and Cara Ellison. Set in Seattle, the plot cast the player as a fledgling thinblood vampire with relatively weak abilities, who was turned as part of a masquerade-violating "mass embrace" of humans. However, in 2020, Mitsoda, Ellison, and creative director Ka'ai Cluney left the project. In February 2021, Hardsuit Labs was also removed as developer and replaced with The Chinese Room. The change also resulted in a different plot which follows an elder vampire, Phyre, after they are awoken in modern Seattle. The sequel was released on 21 October 2025.

A 2018 actual play web series, titled L.A. by Night, aired from 2018 to 2021. L.A. by Night is set in the aftermath of the events of Bloodlines, and features characters from the game. Initially developed by Geek & Sundry, Paradox took over production in 2020 for the show's fourth and fifth seasons.

== Works cited ==
- "The Best of 2004; The 14th Annual Computer Games Awards". Computer Games Magazine. No. 172. Fort Lauderdale, Florida: theGlobe.com. March 2005. pp. 48–56.
- "2004 Games of the Year". Computer Gaming World. No. 249. Cambridge, Massachusetts: Ziff Davis. March 2005. pp. 56–67.
- Osborn, Chuck (2003). "Cover Story: Bloodlines - The Half Life 2 Engine Gets Dead Sexy". PC Gamer US. Vol. 10, no. 114. United States: Ace St. Germain. pp. 46–54. ISSN 1080-4471.
- Osborn, Chuck (2005). "Reviews - Vampire: The Masquerade - Bloodlines". PC Gamer US. Vol. 12, no. 132. United States: Ace St. Germain. pp. 92–94. ISSN 1080-4471.
