= Thievery UT =

2002 video game

- Developer: Black Cat Games
- Engine: Unreal Engine 1
- Platform: Windows
- Release: 28 June 2002
- Genre: Stealth
- Modes: Multiplayer, single-player

Thievery UT (Note: Also known as Thievery for Unreal Tournament.) is a multiplayer mod for the computer game Unreal Tournament. It is based on the gameplay from the Thief series.

== Gameplay ==
The player as a guard wielding a mace. Another guard from the same team is shown on the screen.

The main mode is called Thieves vs Guards where a team of thieves sneak into a location and try to steal as much loot as possible and escape. The other team are guards who try to stop the thieves. Another mode, Thiefmatch, has thieves competing with each other against a group of AI guards. A single-player mode is available against bots. The game includes 11 maps.

== Development ==
According to Robert Graham, a designer at Black Cat Games, the idea for the mod was conceived after the closure of Looking Glass Studios and was developed as an homage to the studio. Unreal Engine 1 was chosen for the game engine due to its similar lighting capabilities to Thief II and for its solid network code.

Black Cat Games was developing a successor mod, Nightblade, for Unreal Tournament 3. No updates had been issued since 2009 until 2024 when the game was cancelled.

== Critical reception ==
Reception

Review scores
Publication	Score
PC PowerPlay	5/5
PC Zone	91% (beta 1.1); 89% (beta 1.4)
PC Life	5/5

PC PowerPlay said the "gameplay is often slow but always intense and nerve-racking." PC Zone reviewed the 1.1 version and called the game "Simply brilliant". In a review for the 1.4 version, PC Zone described the maps as "top class" and continued: "Skins, sounds, weapons and indeed every other feature of the mod are likewise excellent, contributing to a very different but highly addictive game." In 2006, they highlighted Thievery UT as a "classic mod" saying it "had nigh-on everything you'd expect from a multiplayer version of Thief". IGN said the mod "Feels very professional throughout" and described the gameplay as fun and addicting, even in single-player. They criticized some of the music choices and the texturing was noted as bland. Computer Gaming World wrote: "The team did a great job of bringing all the elements of the Thief series into an entirely different engine-the game looks like a prettier version of Thief 2." Svet kompjutera called the graphics unimpressive and the sound effects unconvincing but said the levels and the gameplay are brilliantly designed. The Games Machine praised the unique gameplay, the maps and the lighting system but criticized the lack of a single-player storyline. Computer Games Magazine described the maps as "gorgeous" and called it "an impressive mod". PC Format called it "[...] a genuinely brilliant multiplayer version of Looking Glass classic Thief [...]". David Riegel, designer on Thief: Deadly Shadows, was impressed, saying: "So far it's been great fun" and "It's a big power trip to be able to sneak around live opponents, and I'd say almost as fun to find someone hiding and hunt him or her down." "Mod DB selected Thievery UT as "mod of the month" in March 2006.

== See also ==
- Alien Swarm, the next mod developed by Black Cat Games
