= Bright Eyes vs Her Space Holiday =

EP by Bright Eyes and Her Space Holiday
- Released: 2000
- Genre: Indie rock
- Label: Wichita Recordings

Professional ratings
Review scores
| Source | Rating |
|---|---|
| Drowned in Sound | (10/10) |
| NME | (positive) |

Bright Eyes vs Her Space Holiday is an EP by Bright Eyes and Her Space Holiday. It was released in 2000 on the Wichita Recordings label.

The EP contained recordings by Conor Oberst of "The Calendar Hung Itself...", a song from his 2000 album Fevers and Mirrors, and "Doctor and the DJ" by Marc Bianchi of Her Space Holiday, from his album Home Is Where You Hang Yourself. Two remixes by Bianchi follow, one of his own song "Famous to Me (Hurtful Kid)" and a remix of Oberst's "Contrast and Compare".

The album was released on both vinyl (7") and CD.

== Background ==
In 2000 Her Space Holiday made a licensing deal with Wichita Recordings to release their work in Europe. Bright Eyes was also on the label at the time. The deal with Wichita led to Her Space Holiday touring with Bright Eyes, amongst other bands. Her Space Holiday had previously featured Bright Eyes remixes on the remix disk of Home Is Where You Hang Yourself.

== Music ==
"The Calendar Hung Itself" featured 'jagged' vocals, repetitive guitar and synthesizers. Marc Bianchi's remix of "Contrast and Compare" made "major changes", including slurred vocals, keyboard 'drones' and a flute solo. A review in NME called Bright Eyes the 'angrier' of the two, whereas Her Space Holiday was 'languid[ly] atmospheric'.

== Track listing ==
1. The Calendar Hung Itself... - Bright Eyes
2. Doctor and the DJ - Her Space Holiday
3. Contrast and Compare [Making Words Work Mix] - Her Space Holiday remix of Bright Eyes Song
4. Famous to Me (Hurtful Kid) - Her Space Holiday remix
