= The Past Presents the Future =

The Past Presents the Future may refer to:

- "The Past Presents the Future" (Ugly Betty), an episode of the American comedy-drama series Ugly Betty
- The Past Presents the Future (album), a 2005 album by Her Space Holiday
