= Her Space Holiday =

- Born: Marc Paul Bianchi
- Origin: California, United States
- Genres: Indietronic; Indie rock Emo
- Years active: 1996–2011, 2017-present
- Labels: Mush Records; Tiger Style; Train Bridge Recordings; Wichita
- Website: www.herspaceholiday.com

Her Space Holiday is the recording moniker of indietronic and indie rock artist Marc Paul Bianchi.

== History ==
Marc Bianchi began as a musician in the California hardcore scene. He was a part of Indian Summer and Mohinder before assuming the moniker "Her Space Holiday" in 1996. Initially, Bianchi was not interested in releasing Her Space Holiday's first works, as he was focused on launching the bands associated with his new (now defunct) record label Audio Information Phenomena. However, after being approached by Berkeley based music label Train Bridge Recordings to record a 12-inch EP, Her Space Holiday became Bianchi's full-time project.

Since the release of Her Space Holiday's first EP, the band has released six full-length albums, several singles and EPs, and a remix album. He has toured with Bright Eyes, The Faint, Pinback, Bob Mould, The American Analog Set, Lymbyc Systym and others. He has also remixed songs from REM, Duster, The Faint, The American Analog Set, Xiu Xiu, and others. Influences on Her Space Holiday have included Kraftwerk, Brian Eno, Orchestral Manoeuvres in the Dark, and Simon & Garfunkel.

Released on October 7, 2008, in the United States, XOXO, Panda And The New Kid Revival is a departure from previous Her Space Holiday albums and with a new, less electronically oriented sound. Bianchi brings a folk and jam feel and instrumentation to the material, with emphasis on songwriting. The live band for the Xoxo Panda material features Andrew Kenny of American Analog Set, and Mike Bell and Jared Bell of Lymbyc Systym. This was followed with the release of a self-titled album on August 16, 2011, along with the announcement that this would be the last album from Her Space Holiday.

Sometime in 2017 it was announced through the official website that Her Space Holiday would be ending its six year hiatus and releasing an EP during Summer 2017. The EP, Gravity, was released in January 2018.

== Discography ==
=== Studio ===
- Audio Astronomy 12-inch (1997, Train Bridge Recordings)
  - Re-release: Audio Astronomy 12-inch (2002, Tiger Style Records) – with additional tracks
- The Astronauts Are Sleeping, Volume 1 (1999, Skylab Operations)
- The Astronauts Are Sleeping, Volume 2 (1999, No Karma)
  - Re-release: The Astronauts Are Sleeping 2.0 (2002, Neoplex Records) – Japanese release
- Home Is Where You Hang Yourself (2000, Tiger Style / Wichita Recordings)
  - Re-release: Home Is Where You Hang Yourself 2.0 (2002, Tiger Style)
- Manic Expressive (2001, Tiger Style / Wichita)
- The Young Machines (2003, Mush Records / Wichita / & Records)
- The Past Presents the Future (2005, Wichita / V2 / & / Neoplex)
- The Telescope (2006, Youth Records / And) – Japanese release
- XOXO, Panda And The New Kid Revival (2008, Mush)
- Her Space Holiday (album) (2011, No More Good Ideas)

=== EPs ===
- Something Blue CDEP (Bravenoiserecords)
- Silent Films CDEP (2000, Dogprint)
- Let's Get Quiet Vol. 1 CDEP / 12-inch (2005, Mush)
- Let's Get Quiet Vol. 2 CDEP / 12-inch (2007, Mush)
- Sleepy Tigers CDEP / 12-inch (2009, Mush)
- The Early Paws Collection (2009, No More Good Ideas)
- Gravity (2018)

=== Singles ===
- Electronic Sunshine (Audio Information Phenomena)
- Split single with Flowchart, featuring the track "Silent Films"
- Wish List 7-inch (Motorway) – Japanese release
- "Slide Guitars and Moving Cars" 7-inch (Clover) – Japanese release
- "Bright Eyes vs Her Space Holiday" split 7-inch / CD - Wichita Recordings 2000
- "My Girlfriend's Boyfriend" CD single Wichita Recordings – European release 2004

=== Remix and compilation albums ===
- Ambidextrous (2001, Wichita) – UK release
- The Young Machines Remixed (2004, Mush / Wichita / &)
- The Early Paws Collection (2009) - US tour release

A promotional MP3 of the song "Sleepy Tigers," from the album XOXO, Panda And The New Kid Revival, can be found here.
