= Voerman =

Voerman is a Dutch-language surname literally meaning "coachman". Notable people with the surname include:

- Jan Voerman Sr. (1857-1941), Dutch painter
- Jan Voerman Jr. (1890-1976), Dutch painter, lithographer and illustrator
- Gerrit Voerman (born 1957), Dutch historian, professor and director of the Documentation Centre of Dutch Political Parties
- Rob Voerman (born 1966), Dutch graphic artist, sculptor and installation artist

== Fictional characters ==
- Jeanette Voerman
