= Tiger-style =

Tiger-style, TigerStyle, Tiger Style, or variant, may refer to:

- Tiger Style Records, record company
- Tiger Kung Fu, Tiger-style of Kung Fu
- Tiger Kuntao, Tiger-style of Kuntao
- Tigerstripe, Tiger-style clothing
- Tiger Style, game company
- Tigerstyle, Scottish band
