= Spider: Rite of the Shrouded Moon =

2015 video game

- Developer: Tiger Style
- Publisher: Tiger Style
- Director: Randy Smith
- Engine: Unity
- Platforms: Android, iOS, Linux, OS X, Windows, PlayStation 4, PlayStation Vita
- Release: Android, iOS, PC; August 6, 2015; PlayStation 4, PlayStation Vita; October 25, 2016
- Genre: Puzzle
- Mode: Single-player

Spider: Rite of the Shrouded Moon is a 2015 puzzle video game developed by Tiger Style. It is the sequel to the multiple award-winning 2009 game Spider: The Secret of Bryce Manor.

== Gameplay ==
Gameplay in Spider

The player takes control of a spider whose primary goal is to survive by spinning webs and eating insects. At the same time, the player can explore the manor, searching for secrets and clues.

The aim in each level is to eat a certain amount of insects. At this point, a portal to the next level will open, although the player can remain in the level and eat the rest of the insects if they wish. Insects include, but are not limited to, moths, crickets, ladybugs and wasps. Hornets are unique in the game insofar as they cannot be caught in a web. Instead, they must be attacked directly by jumping into them.

The game has the ability to track the location of the player, as well as the time of day and weather, which can affect certain conditions in the levels such as insect placement and puzzles.

== Plot ==
A spider hunts its prey. The game is set in a location called Blackbird Estate. Finding out what happened to the former occupants of the manor is optional, and is never explicitly foregrounded in the game; the player is free to come to their own conclusions as to what happened by interpreting the various pieces of evidence they find. Certain elements of the plot are based on a real historical society, and players must do research into this society to make full sense of the story.

== Development ==
It was first announced on November 27, 2013. The game was showcased at the 2015 Games Developers Conference.

== Reception ==
Reception

Aggregate score
Aggregator	Score
Metacritic	iOS: 91/100

Review scores
Publication	Score
Destructoid	PC: 8.5/10
TouchArcade	iOS: 5/5

Spider: Rite of the Shrouded Moon was released to positive reviews, holding an aggregate of 91 out of 100 on Metacritic. Destructoid awarded it a score of 8.5 out of 10, saying "there's still the incredibly fun web-slinging, insect-catching action to focus on". TouchArcade awarded it a score of five out of five stars, saying "It's a better game, a cooler experience, and a must-buy for action-adventure aficionados and aspiring arachnids alike."
