= Jeanette Voerman =

Fictional character from Vampire: The Masquerade

- World of Darkness character
- Jeanette as seen in Bloodlines
- First game: Vampire: The Masquerade – Bloodlines (2004)
- Created by: Brian Mitsoda
- Voiced by: Grey DeLisle-Griffin
- Portrayed by: Erin Layne; Whitney Moore (L.A. by Night)

In-universe information
- Species: Vampire
- Origin: Los Angeles, California
- Nationality: American

Jeanette Voerman is a character from the 2004 video game Vampire: The Masquerade – Bloodlines, an action role-playing video game developed by Troika Games and published by Activision. Set in White Wolf Publishing's World of Darkness setting, the game is based on White Wolf's tabletop role-playing game Vampire: The Masquerade. Created by Brian Mitsoda, an early version of her character was debuted in the E3 demo for the game as a means to attract the attention of journalists. In game, she is voiced by Grey DeLisle-Griffin, and on the box art and promotional artwork for the title, she is portrayed by Erin Layne. In live-action media, she has been portrayed by Whitney Moore in L.A. by Night.

She is one of the two vampire co-Barons of Santa Monica, California, and owner of the Asylum night club, the other being Therese Voerman. Though both regard the other as their twin sister, Jeanette is the alter of Therese, who due to abuse has dissociative identity disorder. Neither is dominant or aware they share the same body, and Jeanette actively works to sabotage Therese. In books for the role-playing game, it is established that Asylum has become a global franchise, with Jeanette and Therese alternatively managing either the Santa Monica or Hollywood locations.

Jeanette has been cited as one of the best aspects of Bloodlines, praised for both her character design and character, and introduction and portrayal helped set the tone of the game. While some have criticized her character's sexualization as fanservice intended for a male audience, others have argued it works in line with her character and cited her high popularity with fan communities who have portrayed her through cosplay. Her relationship with her other personality Therese has also been analyzed, both through the scope of their contrasting personalities and how their issues reflect perceptions of successful women in the modern age.

== Conception and design ==
Jeanette was written for Vampire: The Masquerade – Bloodlines by Brian Mitsoda, who described her as a "combination of seduction, mischief, tragedy, and madness". One of the first character models made for the game, during the E3 demo Jeanette was not fully fleshed out. He wrote an early treatment of her as a "sexpot seductress fit for the E3 crowd to make the journalists collectively say 'garsh', blush and wave shyly", placing her in the game's strip club location to give players a quest to follow for the demo. As her character was developed and moved to another night club location in the game, Mitsoda was told to have her be more akin to her E3 version as the team leads felt she was not "sexy enough". Not wanting to undermine the character Jeanette had become, he wrote another character, Velvet Velour, to satisfy their mandates and placed her in the strip club.

As the game takes place in White Wolf Publishing's World of Darkness setting, Jeannette is defined as a vampire belonging to the Malkavian clan, who are inflicted with mental issues. Jeanette is the alter of Therese Voerman, a woman suffering from dissociative identity disorder, caused in response to abuse Therese suffered as a child. Both are fully developed personalities unaware of the other within the same body, and neither is considered the dominant personality, instead regarding one another as siblings. To portray it accurately, Mitsoda studied cases of the affliction, while other aspects of her character were based on an ex-girlfriend.

Jeanette is a pale woman with eyeshadow smeared heavily around her eyes and her blonde hair trussed into two pigtails on either side of her head. Her outfit consists of a sexualized Catholic schoolgirl outfit with a short blue skirt, white thigh-high stockings, a red choker, and brown shoes. Her underwear band is raised on each hip above the skirt, while her shirt is unbuttoned and tied below her breasts, exposing her cleavage and red bra. On the game's cover and promotional material she is portrayed by professional model Erin Layne, who was offered the job after a chance meeting with Shane DeFreest of Activision, the game's publisher. The photographs were taken by artist Tim Bradstreet, with the instructions for the photographs for the cover art to convey a "alluring and mysterious mood". In-game, Jeanette and Therese are both voiced by Grey DeLisle-Griffin, with the primary difference being delivery and tone.

== Appearances ==
Jeanette Voerman is a vampire in the 2004 video game action role-playing video game Vampire: The Masquerade – Bloodlines, developed by Troika Games and based on White Wolf Publishing's Vampire: The Masquerade role-playing game. Acting as co-Barons of Santa Monica within the vampire society, they are actively hostile to one another. The player can choose to do missions for either of them, with both wanting a pendant from the game's Ocean House Hotel location. If the player gives the pendant to Jeanette, she will task them with destroying an art gallery exhibit. Upon returning to the Asylum they are confronted by Therese, who threatens the player as the exhibit was hers, and it is then revealed both Jeanette and Therese are two personalities in the same body. Due to being ritually sexually abused by their father, their personality fractured in two, with Jeanette killing their father. Depending on the dialogue choices, the player can either side with either Therese or Jeanette, or convince the two to coexist. During the questline, the player can also romance and sleep with Jeanette, regardless of gender.

Jeanette later appears in the 2013 live-action role-playing book Mind's Eye Theatre: Vampire: The Masquerade and the 2018 5th edition rulebook for the Vampire: The Masquerade tabletop game, depicted by an uncredited model. The latter makes note that the Asylum has now become a global franchise, with Jeanette and Therese directly managing either its Santa Monica or Hollywood locations. She also appears in the 2020 livestream series L.A. by Night, portrayed by Whitney Moore. Set fifteen years after the events of Bloodlines, she and Therese still hold control over Santa Monica, though she tries to undermine Therese and to kill or seriously injure her. Meanwhile, in other video games, Activision included Jeanette's appearance as a skin as part of their "All-Start" character lineup for True Crime: Streets of LA's multiplayer mode.

== Critical reception ==
Therese's formal appearance has been described as suggesting the look of a dominatrix in comparison to Jeanette's submissive appearance.

Jeanette was well-received upon debut. Green Man Gaming's Diego Nicolás Argüello described her as "looking almost as a Harley Quinn living cosplay after being in too many parties" and emphasized that she helped establish the foundation for the game and what players should expect. He further praised how her facial expressions, movement and grace in how she spoke helped give underlying clues to her character, and her introduction helped take the game's "emerging atmosphere to a whole new level". Joe Martin of Bit-Tech meanwhile called her the game's "one saving grace". He stated that while on the surface she appeared to be a "slutty vampire-schoolgirl designed to lure pre-pubescents" and acknowledged that factored heavily into how memorable she was, he added that Jeanette was also a complicated character and further appreciated how her plot twist both blindsided players and helped to set the game's overall tone.

Alex Lucard of DieHard GameFan called Jeanette "one of the most ogled, modded, and lusted after female video game characters of all time". Describing her fanbase as "obsessed", he noted the heavy presence in not only cosplay but also fan mods for other games and Bloodlines itself, the latter of which included new outfits and nude mods for the character. Lucard added that the reaction was partially surprising given the commercial failure of the game; he attributed it to the title's well written characters, particularly praising Jeanette as the "most memorable and complex" in this regard. He echoed the earlier statements that the character on the surface appeared to be mostly fan service due to her large breasts and highly sexual nature but called her "deep but totally insane". He observed that her use of sexuality was more to manipulate others and, despite the game's flaws, heavily appreciated how well-written her story was. Lucard further described her as "pound-for-pound the single best written vampire character in any one game" and felt White Wolf using her in other media could only heighten that aspect.

Her appearance on promotional imagery for the game was utilized by Rocksteady Studios for the Arkham City redesign of Harley Quinn for the game. In concept art notes, they directed the artists to use Jeanette's appearance from the neck up but with "skunk" red and black color streaks in her hair, as they wanted an unmasked look for Quinn in the game.

=== Analysis of character themes ===
Ishan C. Asman in an article for Turkish magazine Oyungezer described her as having a "white princess" aspect, adding that the "party girl, from the very first moment, with her flirty but also not trying to hide her head-over-heels frivolity, flawlessly intoxicates" players. He further saw her as the polar opposite to Therese, who he described as having an "unwavering puritanical stance" and ruling aggressively. Ishan compared their duality to the two-faced Roman deity Janus—who had one face looking to the past while the other to the future, something he felt worked well with the Malkavian mythology in the franchise—and enjoyed that players themselves could reference this when interacting with her. He furthermore with what is presented in the game there is room to interpret them as unreliable narrators with several interpretations of their backstory, and this inability to fully understand their past helped add to Jeanette's allure.

Rock Paper Shotgun's Cara Ellison meanwhile when playing through Jeanette's quest in Bloodlines observed that players would want Jeanette and by extension Therese to like them because of how they were written. She elaborated that the player was encouraged to please the duo due to them being "hot" and "interesting", particularly emphasizing their "glamorous" aspect. She observed through the game's themes that Jeanette seemed the one to end the cycle of abuse by their father, being the stronger of the two. Ellison observed that Therese appeared to reflect "obedience and correspondence with society's awful demands", prospering but only able to leave the violence inflicted on her due to Jeanette, who was a symbol of disobedience, "the goth Britney Spears to Therese's pant suits" and constantly slut shamed by Therese. She felt both elements seemed to come as a cost, and while Ellison felt there were deeper questions, she pointed out it also reflected a trope of women having mental illness in fiction, the idea that there "doesn't seem to be a role for us in the popular imagination that understands exactly how we can exist without becoming ill".

Dr. Roberto Dillon and Associate Professor Anita Lundberg of the James Cook University in Singapore discussed Jeanette and her story in a paper about vampires in video games for the journal eTropic. Describing her as a "prototype of a wild, sexy and reckless girl", they argued in contrast to Therese's dominatrix undertones, Jeanette suggested those of a submissive, though her behavior showed otherwise. Meanwhile, they felt aspects of the character's background that were purposefully left out helped develop moral ambiguity as the player attempts to resolve the conflict between the two, and the dark themes allowed the player to reflect on the nature of sexual abuse and domestic violence. They observed that these themes are "too often avoided, unvoiced or silenced in real life" and helped signify the vampires in the title as "the return of the repressed" while tying into vampire stories originating from the Southern United States.

=== Regarding character sexualization ===
Others were more critical of Jeanette. Nils Bernd Michael Weber for the book Vampire: Zwischen Blutdurst und Triebverzicht felt that her presentation for the box art and the fact players could have sex with her in-game undermined the impact of introducing sexuality into the title and reduced it to fan service for a male audience. Furthermore, her proclivity to sleep with the protagonist regardless of gender presented the game in a heteronormative manner to Weber, effectively making her and most other characters in the game "protagosexual". Meanwhile, University of Salamanca professor Daniel Escandell Montiel and lecturer Miriam Borham Puyal, writing for the journal Oceánide, felt that Jeanette reflected a trend of "hypersexualized female vampire characters" designed for the "male fantasy of a female vampire" that followed the release of the game BloodRayne, with Jeanette representing the "alluring vampire" archetype in contrast to Therese's "dominating" one. Though they stated her backstory of abuse showed her as a survivor and complicated her character as more than just a foe or object of consumption, they still felt overall her character was "commodified to be marketed to a mainly male audience".

In contrast, Rock Paper Shotgun founder Kieron Gillen argued in an article for Eurogamer that Jeanette and her sex appeal were an example of Bloodlines's characters feeling natural rather than "callow posturing" as seen with other titles. While he noted due to the box art, one could assume Jeanette was a character strictly meant for fanservice, Gillen expressed that the character was not treated as such in-game. Elaborating on the point he noted that while much of her dialogue appeared to be "a babble of egocentric nonsense", something typical of Malkavians in the franchise's lore, he considered it "carefully judged" dialogue and described her further as "essentially a goth LiveJournal with legs, and, in her extreme way, credible". He additionally argued that while her sexuality was heavily emphasized particularly due to her large breasts and cleavage, it fit well within the game's plot, as Jeanette is the only character portrayed in this manner and does so by her own accord. He felt this not only helped set Bloodlines apart from other games that used similar sexualized characters but encouraged the player to question why, and—to the developer's credit—they provided a reason.
