= Sleepy Tigers =

EP by Her Space Holiday
- Released: July 21, 2008
- Genre: Indie rock
- Length: 12:44
- Label: Mush Records

Sleepy Tigers is an EP by Her Space Holiday released July 21, 2008. The title track also appears on the album XOXO, Panda And The New Kid Revival.

== Track listing ==
1. "Sleepy Tigers" – 3:29
2. "Just Another Day" – 3:13
3. "This Seat Is Definitely Taken" – 3:12
4. "Same Song Sing Along" – 2:48
