= Her Space Holiday (album) =

Studio album by Her Space Holiday
- Released: August 16, 2011
- Length: 34:59
- Label: No More Good Ideas

Her Space Holiday chronology
XOXO, Panda and the New Kid Revival (2008)	Her Space Holiday (2011)

Her Space Holiday is a studio album by American musician Marc Bianchi under the pseudonym Her Space Holiday. It was released on August 16, 2011, through his record label No More Good Ideas. It received mixed or average reviews from critics.

== Background ==
The album was recorded in two separate locations: the first being in the Bay Area in 2008 and 2009; the second being in Texas, where Marc Bianchi moved to in 2009. It was released through Bianchi's record label No More Good Ideas, and it was intended to be Her Space Holiday's final record. However, in 2018, Her Space Holiday released the Gravity EP through No More Good Ideas.

== Critical reception ==
Professional ratings
Aggregate scores
Source	Rating
Metacritic	60/100
Review scores
Source	Rating
AllMusic	3.5/5 stars
The Austin Chronicle	3.5/5 stars
Blurt	7/10 stars
Consequence	2.5/5 stars
PopMatters	4/10 stars
Spectrum Culture	1.5/5.0
Tiny Mix Tapes	1.5/5 stars

According to the review aggregator Metacritic, Her Space Holiday received "mixed or average reviews" based on a weighted average score of 60 out of 100 from 6 critic scores.

Harley Brown of Consequence stated, "Despite the plethora of guest artists and novel sounds, Her Space Holiday reveals the growing pains of Bianchi evolving his breathy, depressive lyrics and minimalist synthetic touches into something more uplifting." Ron Hart of Blurt commented that "Her Space Holiday brings together all the key elements of Bianchi's decade-and-a-half of coloring outside the lines of the pop infrastructure to deliver a swan song appropriately fitting for his underrated one-man-act." Ned Raggett of AllMusic stated, "Marc Bianchi's decision to wrap up Her Space Holiday seemed to come out of the blue, but the self-titled conclusion serves as a gentle, appropriate valediction, something that simultaneously draws on the understated bedroom pop that he first made his name with while feeling like a big, final bow, scaled to a stage or a screen."

== Track listing ==
Her Space Holiday track listing
No.	Title	Length
1.	"Anything for Progress"	3:49
2.	"Black Cat Balloons"	2:54
3.	"Shonanoka"	3:50
4.	"The Hummingbirds"	3:29
5.	"Come On All You Soldiers"	3:23
6.	"The Candle Jumped Over the Spoon"	3:32
7.	"Ghost in the Garden"	2:59
8.	"The Bullet, the Battle, the Trigger, the Barrel and Me"	3:08
9.	"Death of a Writer"	3:54
10.	"In the Time It Takes for the Lights to Change"	3:56
Total length:		34:59
