= The Young Machines =

Studio album by Her Space Holiday
- Released: September 30, 2003
- Genre: Indie pop
- Length: 44:28
- Label: Mush Records
- Producer: Marc Bianchi

Her Space Holiday chronology
Manic Expressive (2001)	The Young Machines (2003)	The Young Machines Remixed (2004)

The Young Machines is a studio album by Her Space Holiday. It was released on Mush Records on September 30, 2003.

== Critical reception ==
Professional ratings
Aggregate scores
Source	Rating
Metacritic	73/100
Review scores
Source	Rating
AllMusic	3/5 stars
Entertainment Weekly	A−
Pitchfork	6.9/10
Stylus Magazine	C
Uncut	4/10

At Metacritic, which assigns a weighted average score out of 100 to reviews from mainstream critics, The Young Machines received an average score of 73, based on 14 reviews, indicating "generally favorable reviews".

Kenyon Hopkin of AllMusic praised the album's "lush IDM-powered indie pop." Kilian Murphy of Stylus Magazine wrote: "An intriguing mixture of laptop-electronica and emotional indie song writing, this is engagingly quirky stuff."

== Track listing ==
All tracks are written by Marc Bianchi.

No.	Title	Length
1.	"The Young Machines"	4:25
2.	"Something to Do with My Hands"	3:33
3.	"Tech Romance"	4:20
4.	"Sleepy California"	5:00
5.	"Japanese Gum"	3:48
6.	"Meet the Pressure"	4:47
7.	"My Girlfriend's Boyfriend"	4:31
8.	"The Luxury of Loneliness"	4:40
9.	"Girl Problem"	4:15
10.	"From South Carolina"	5:10
Total length:		44:28

== Personnel ==
Credits adapted from liner notes.

- Marc Bianchi – music
- Alan Douches – mastering
- Clust.TM – art, design

== Release history ==
Region	Date	Label	Format	Catalog
United States	September 30, 2003	Mush Records	CD	MH-224
UK	October 20, 2003	Wichita Recordings	CD	WEBB047CD
Europe	October 20, 2003	Wichita Recordings	CD	VVR1024982
Japan	January 21, 2004	& Records	CD	NPPX-31
