= Spider: The Secret of Bryce Manor =

2009 video game

- Developer: Tiger Style
- Publisher: Tiger Style
- Designers: David Kalina, Randy Smith
- Platforms: iOS, Android
- Release: Original: WW: August 10, 2009; Director's Cut: WW: December 21, 2009; HD version: WW: August 2, 2010; Android: WW: March 23, 2013
- Genre: Puzzle
- Mode: Single-player

Spider: The Secret of Bryce Manor is a 2009 side-scrolling action-puzzle video game for iOS and Android, developed and published by Tiger Style. The player takes control of a spider who comes to reside in to the deserted Bryce Manor and must spin webs to trap various types of insects, whilst simultaneously ascertaining what happened to the former residents of the manor. The game received critical acclaim and won multiple awards. Originally released in August, a Director's Cut update replaced the original version on the App Store in December. The update added ten levels, twenty-four Game Center achievements, new music, more story elements and an insect (the hornet). A year after the game's initial release, a HD version was released for the iPad. In 2013, the game was also released for Android. A sequel, Spider: Rite of the Shrouded Moon, was released in August 2015 for iOS, Android, Windows, Mac and Linux.

== Gameplay ==
Gameplay in Spider

The player takes control of a spider whose primary goal is to survive by spinning webs and eating insects. At the same time, the player can explore the manor, searching for secrets and clues. Finding out what happened to the former occupants of the manor is an optional side quest, and is never explicitly foregrounded in the game; the player is free to come to their own conclusions as to what happened by interpreting the various pieces of evidence they find.

Each level represents a room or area in Bryce Manor and is viewed in a side-scrolling 2D display. Using the touchscreen, the player controls the movement of the spider. Pressing on the right or left side of the screen will make the spider walk in that direction. Swiping in any direction will make the spider jump. To have the spider spin a web, the player must first tap on the screen, and then jump from one surface to another. If the distance between the two surfaces is too great, the web will break. To capture insects, the player must create a triangle of web strands.

The aim in each level is to eat a certain amount of insects. At this point, a portal to the next level will open, although the player can remain in the level and eat the rest of the insects if they wish. Insects include, but are not limited to, moths, crickets, ladybugs and wasps. Hornets are unique in the game insofar as they cannot be caught in a web. Instead, they must be attacked directly by jumping into them.

The game includes four main modes; "Adventure", "Feeding Frenzy", "Hunger", and "Precision". Adventure mode is the basic story mode. Hunger is an endless mode where the player must keep eating insects until they die. Feeding Frenzy gives the player a limited amount of time to complete each level. Precision gives the player a limited amount of silk with which to complete each level.

== Reception ==
Reception

Aggregate score
Aggregator	Score
Metacritic	93/100

Review scores
Publication	Score
Gamezebo	5/5
IGN	8.9/10
Pocket Gamer	8/10
TouchArcade	5/5
148Apps	4.5/5
AppSmile	5/5
AppSpy	5/5
Slide to Play	4/4

Awards
Publication	Award
AppGamer	iPhone Game of the Year (2009)
Game Developers Choice Awards	Best Debut Game (2009 - nominated)
Game Developers Choice Awards	Best Handheld Game (2009 - nominated)
Independent Games Festival	Best Mobile Game (2009)
Independent Games Festival	Best iPhone Game (2009)
Slide to Play	Best Platformer Game (2009)
TouchArcade	2009 iPhone Game of the Year

Spider: The Secret of Bryce Manor was released to critical acclaim. It holds an aggregate score of 93 out of 100 on Metacritic, based on 12 reviews.

Pocket Gamer's Tracy Erickson scored the game 8 out of 10, giving it a "Silver Award". He was critical of the controls, which he found oftentimes unresponsive, but called the game "fresh, inventive, and altogether significant." IGN's Levi Buchanan scored it 8.9 out of 10 and awarded it with an "Editor's Choice", arguing that "right now, no game better defines the purity of iPhone game design than Spider: The Secret of Bryce Manor." He praised the controls, the background mystery element to the gameplay and the music, concluding that "Spider is a brilliant little game that could only happen on the iPhone. It's a perfect distillation of a concept -- a spider's exploration -- dropped in the middle of a mystery that you actually don't even need to pay attention to in order to enjoy the game." 148Apps scored it 4.5 out of 5, calling it "one of the most beautiful, elegant, and original iPhone games to date," and praising the graphics, music and controls.

AppSmile scored the game 5 out of 5, calling it "one of the most inventive and unique games that we've come across," and concluding "There is nothing like Spider in the app store. It stands on its own and stands proudly. Replay value abounds, from attempting to capture all bugs to unlocking all achievements to just having fun spinning webs and enjoying the spider's control scheme. We can't praise the game enough for bringing something new, exciting, and addicting to the app store." AppSpy's Andrew Nesvadba also scored it 5 out of 5, writing "With a subtle narrative told only by experiencing the game, this is the kind of app that may be marked as a key moment in the history of mobile phone gaming." Gamezebo's Nathan Meunier also scored it 5 out of 5, writing "Atmosphere plays a huge role in Spider, and the beautifully hand drawn artwork pairs nicely with the hip soundtrack to evoke and intensify the sense of mystery that's so crucial to the game." Also giving it 5 out of 5, TouchArcade wrote "Spider: The Secret of Bryce Manor is a lovely original iPhone game that we highly recommend." Slide to Play's Riordan Frost scored it 4 out of 4, writing "Spider is an incredibly innovative game which we don't see often enough in the App Store. Its unique character provides a breath of fresh air."

The game would go on to win multiple awards, including AppGamer's iPhone Game of the Year, the Independent Games Festival's Best Mobile Game and Best iPhone Game (2009), Slide to Play's Best Platform Game (2009) and TouchArcade's 2009 iPhone Game of the Year. It was also nominated for Debut Game of the Year and Best Handheld Game at the Game Developers Choice Awards. As of May 2012, Spider had sold over 300,000 copies.

== Sequel ==
A sequel called Spider: Rite of the Shrouded Moon was released in August 2015.
