= Waking Mars =

2012 video game

- Steam grid image
- Developer: Tiger Style
- Designers: Randy Smith; David Kalina; Randy O’Connor
- Artists: Amanda Williams; Mallika Sundaramurthy; Randy O'Connor; Whitney Clayton
- Composers: Ethan Frederick Greene; Scott Barber; Jef Drawbaugh; Randy Smith; Damien Di Fede
- Platforms: Windows, OS X, Linux; Android, iOS
- Release: March 2012
- Genre: Metroidvania
- Mode: Single-player

Waking Mars is a 2012 Metroidvania game developed and published by Tiger Style. Players jetpack through underground Mars caves and encounter a host of alien lifeforms that operate as an ecosystem. Players must master the behaviors of these creatures to create ecosystems of their own design to survive and discover the secrets of Mars' past. The game has been nominated for Best Mobile Game and Excellence in Audio in 2012 Independent Game Festival. In June 2012, Waking Mars was also named the Best Game of 2012 (So Far) by Paste.

The game was originally developed for iOS and released on iTunes in March 2012. Microsoft Windows, Mac OS X, Linux and Android versions of this game were released as part of the Humble Indie Bundle for Android 4 on November 8, 2012.

The game was released on Desura on December 5, 2012, and on Steam on December 13 after being successfully green-lit by the Steam users.

== Reception ==
The reception has been generally positive, with the game receiving favorable reviews on Steam as well as numerous other publications.

Reception

Aggregate score
Aggregator	Score
Metacritic	iOS: 84/100; PC: 79/100

Review score
Publication	Score
TouchArcade	iOS: 5/5
