= XOXO, Panda and the New Kid Revival =

Studio album by Her Space Holiday
- Released: October 7, 2008
- Genre: Indie rock
- Length: 49:36
- Label: Mush Records

Her Space Holiday chronology
The Telescope (2006)	XOXO, Panda and the New Kid Revival (2008)	Her Space Holiday (2011)

XOXO, Panda and the New Kid Revival is Marc Bianchi's 2008 album under his pseudonym Her Space Holiday. The album was released on October 7, 2008. In this album, Bianchi abandons the computerized sounds that marked previous Her Space Holiday efforts in favor of an organic, folk-driven style. The track "Sleepy Tigers", which also became its own EP, has become his most known and most played on his Myspace page, having over 350,000 plays.

== Critical reception ==
Professional ratings
Aggregate scores
Source	Rating
Metacritic	65/100
Review scores
Source	Rating
Allmusic	3.5/5 stars
Alternative Press	7/10
Drowned in Sound	7/10
Hot Press	3/5
LAS Magazine	7.6/10
Pitchfork Media	6/10
PopMatters	6/10 stars
Q Magazine	6/10
Tiny Mix Tapes	2.5/5 stars

XOXO, Panda and the New Kid Revival received mixed to positive reviews from critics. It scored a 65 out of 100 on review aggregator MetaCritic. Its departure from Her Space Holiday's previous darker, more indietronica work is mentioned frequently. For example, Rolling Stone Magazine describes the album as "brighter" than Her Space Holiday's previous releases, and calls the tracks "charming" and "simple". LAS Magazine describes the album as a "divergence from his defining brand of electro-infused indie-rock to unapologetic, cadenced pop" and calling the lyrics "sometimes playful, sometimes cringe-inducing". The magazine rated the album a 7.6 out of 10. Webzine PopMatters warns that the album is "worth hearing, just don’t expect anything life-changing", and describes Bianchi's vocals as "less-than-stellar". Still, the webzine awarded the album a 6 out of 10 rating.

== Track listing ==
No.	Title	Length
1.	"The New Kid Revival"	3:42
2.	"The Truth Hurts So This Should Be Painless"	3:51
3.	"The Heartbreak Moment"	3:28
4.	"The Year in Review"	3:50
5.	"No More Good Ideas"	2:47
6.	"The Boys and Girls (Good Morning)"	3:52
7.	"Sleepy Tigers"	3:28
8.	"The World Will Deem Us Dangerous"	3:29
9.	"My Crooked Crown"	3:19
10.	"Four Tapping Shoes and a Kiss"	3:16
11.	"The Telescope"	2:43
12.	"Two Tin Cans and a Length of String"	4:10
13.	"The Day in Review"	3:25
14.	"One for My Soul (Good Night)"	4:26
15.	"The Third Man"	1:16
