= Home Is Where You Hang Yourself =

Studio album by Her Space Holiday
- Released: 2000
- Genre: Indie-Electronica
- Label: Tiger Style (US); Wichita Recordings (UK)
- Producer: Marc Bianchi

Her Space Holiday chronology
The Astronauts Are Sleeping (1999)	Home Is Where You Hang Yourself (2000)	Ambidextrous (2001)

Professional ratings
Review scores
Source	Rating
AllMusic	3.5/5 stars
Drowned in Sound	10/10
The Encyclopedia of Popular Music	3/5 stars
Pitchfork	6.0/10

Home Is Where You Hang Yourself is an album by Her Space Holiday. It was released in 2000 on Tiger Style Records in the United States, and Wichita Recordings in the UK. The album was re-released on a single CD as Home Is Where You Hang Yourself 2.0, in 2002.

== Critical reception ==
Phoenix New Times wrote that "the collection of low-bpm originals on Home Is Where You Hang Yourself is a masterful merging of oscillating synths, barely audible samples and sporadic breaks complementing the morose imagery."

== Disc 1 ==
1. "Home Is Where You Hang Yourself"
2. "Snakecharmer"
3. "Through the Eyes of a Child"
4. "A Matter of Trust"
5. "The Doctor and the DJ"
6. "Sleeping Pills"
7. "Famous to Me"
8. "Can You Blame Me?"
9. "Sugar Water"
10. "Homecoming"

== Disc 2 ==
1. "Misery Loves Company" (Space is Easy Mix)
2. "Godspeed" (Freedom Fighter's Mix) - Aspera Ad Astra
3. "Contrast and Compare" (Making Words Mix) - Bright Eyes
4. "Sounds Just Like an Ocean" (Ocean Floored Mix) - Novasonic Down Hypserspace
5. "Smile Decoy" (To Mars and Back Mix) - Micromars
6. "Singing Arc Lamp" (Natural Satellites Mix) - Mahogany
7. "And Things Are Mostly Ghosts" (Version Overdose Mix) - Duster
8. "Famous to Me" (Hurtful Kid Mix)

== Home Is Where You Hang Yourself 2.0 ==
The album was re-released in 2002 on one disc.

1. "Home Is Where You Hang Yourself"
2. "Snakecharmer"
3. "Through the Eyes of a Child"
4. "A Matter of Trust"
5. "The Doctor and the DJ"
6. "Sleeping Pills"
7. "Famous to Me"
8. "Our First Date"
9. "Can You Blame Me?"
10. "Sugar Water"
11. "Contrast and Compare" (Making Words Mix) - Bright Eyes
12. "Godspeed" (Freedom Fighter's Mix) - Aspera Ad Astra
13. "And Things Are Mostly Ghosts" (Version Overdose Mix) - Duster
14. "Singing Arc Lamp" (Natural Satellites Mix) - Mahogany
15. "Misery Loves Company" (Space is Easy Mix)
16. "Famous to Me" (Hurtful Kid Mix)
