= The Astronauts Are Sleeping =

- Cover art for The Astronauts Are Sleeping (Vol. 1)

Studio album by Her Space Holiday
- Released: 1999
- Genre: Indietronica
- Labels: Skylab Operations (Vol. 1); No Karma (Vol. 2)

Her Space Holiday chronology
Audio Astronomy (1997)	The Astronauts Are Sleeping (1999)	Home Is Where You Hang Yourself (2000)

Professional ratings
Review scores
Source	Rating
Allmusic	3/5 stars
Pitchfork Media	(6.9/10)

The Astronauts Are Sleeping is a double album (actually released in two separate volumes) by Her Space Holiday released in 1999. It was re-released in 2002 as The Astronauts Are Sleeping 2.0.

== Volume 1 ==
This volume was released by Skylab Operations.

1. "Promised a Flight"
2. "Slide Guitars and Moving Cars"
3. "Our Favorite Day"
4. "Sweet Baby Jesus"
5. "Explosion Existence"
6. "The Astronauts Are Sleeping (Exit)"
7. "The Fourth of July"

== Volume 2 ==
This volume was released by No Karma.

1. "These Days"
2. "Crazy"
3. "Sunday Drivers"
4. "Slide Guitars and Moving Cars (Reprise)"
5. "Count on the Days"
6. "Audio Phase"
7. "1939"
8. "You Know Why I Lie"
9. "Homecoming"
10. "Ceilingstars"

== The Astronauts Are Sleeping 2.0 ==
This version was released in Japan in 2002 by Neoplex Records. The tracks are taken from both albums and placed in a different order.

1. The Astronauts Are Sleeping (Enter)
2. Promised a Flight
3. Our Favorite Day
4. Sweet Baby Jesus
5. Explosion Existence
6. Slide Guitars and Moving Cars
7. These Days
8. Sunday Drivers
9. Crazy
10. Count on the Days
11. 1939
12. Ceiling Stars
13. The Astronauts Are Sleeping (Exit)
