= Ocean House Hotel (Vampire: The Masquerade – Bloodlines) =

Fictional location

- World of Darkness location
- The hotel's exterior as it appears in Bloodlines
- First appearance: Vampire: The Masquerade – Bloodlines (2004)
- Created by: Troika Games
- Genre: Action role-playing video game

In-universe information
- Type: Haunted house
- Location: Santa Monica, California

The Ocean House Hotel is a location appearing in the 2004 video game Vampire: The Masquerade – Bloodlines. It is a burnt-out hotel owned by a vampire and haunted by multiple spirits who the player interacts with at varying points, mainly in strange occurrences happening. Game designer Brian Mitsoda began work on the Ocean House Hotel area halfway through its creation, trying to identify what needed to be tweaked and what needed to be added. Because the level is linear, he approached it as if he was creating a theme park ride and researching professional haunted houses and ghost movies. Rather than jumpscares, Mitsoda aimed to instill a feeling of dread in players, citing Alien and Jaws as good examples of not showing the monsters too frequently.

The location received generally positive reception from players, critics, and developers alike, often regarded as one of the best and well-known parts of Bloodlines. It received a game of the year award from GameSpy as the best PC game level of 2004, and Dishonored gameplay programmer Kain Shin highlighted Ocean House Hotel as an important level for designers to research.

== Description ==
In the 2004 video game Vampire: The Masquerade – Bloodlines, the player explores the Ocean House Hotel as part of the quest "The Ghost Haunts at Midnight". It is a burnt out hotel owned by a vampire in Santa Monica, California, and is haunted by the spirits of a woman and her two children, and of her husband, who was the one who killed them and set the hotel on fire. The player visits the hotel to put the spirits to rest, so that the owner's construction workers can continue their work on it. As the player explores the dark hotel and its narrow corridors, they are subjected to several haunted house-style frights, such as barely avoiding a falling chandelier, flickering lights, and a screaming woman walking down the halls in a nightgown.

== Development ==
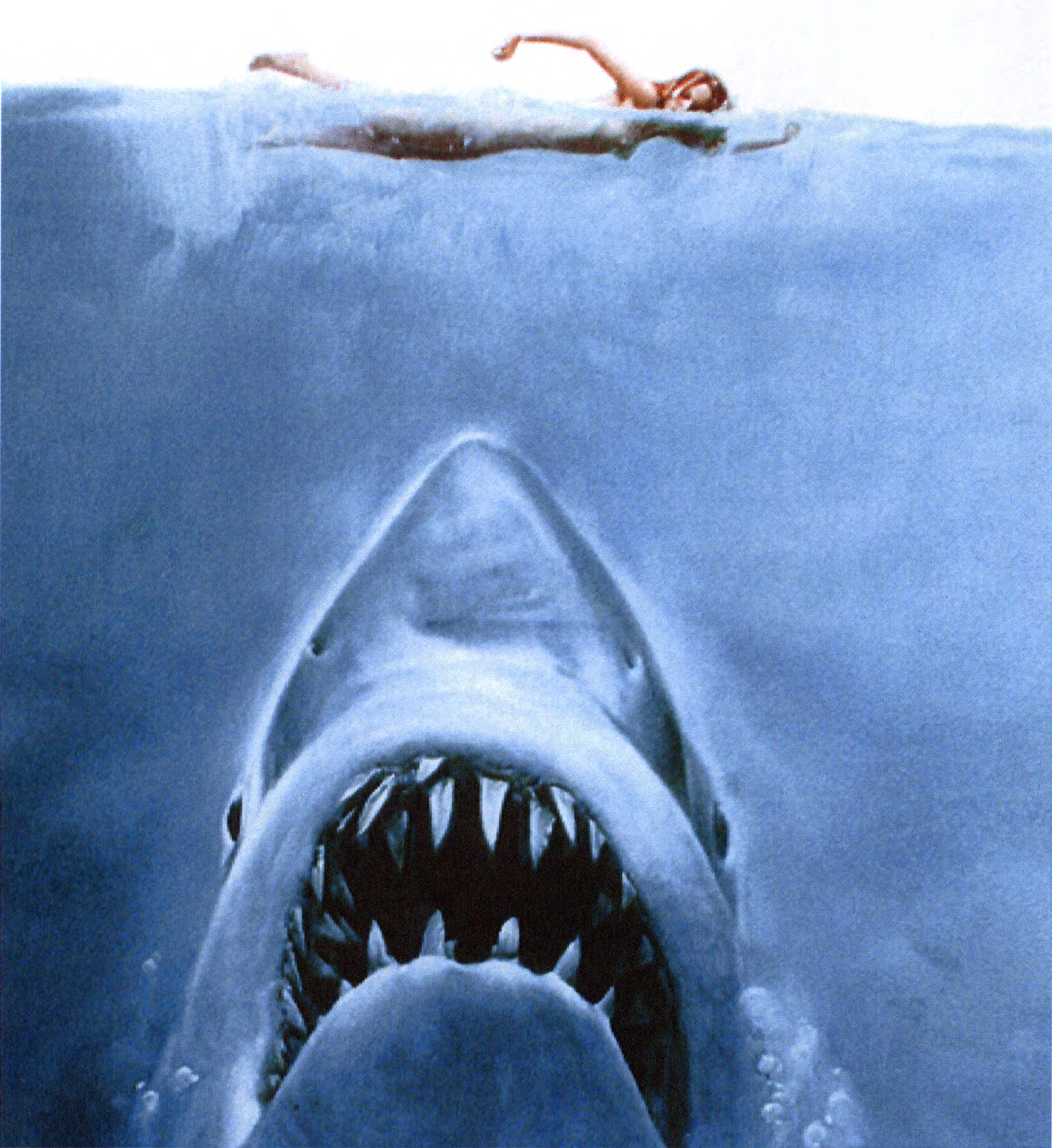
Brian Mitsoda cited Jaws as an example of how monsters are scarier when seen infrequently.

Game designer and writer Brian Mitsoda began working on the level when it was half-finished: he went over it to identify what needed to be reworked and what scripting needed to be added to "bring it to life", as well as adding scare beats; some planned scares did not make it into the final level, however. Additional story beats were also added afterward to communicate to players what happened to the ghosts.

Mitsoda approached the level as a theme park ride, due to its linearity, and prepared by researching tricks used in professional haunted houses, as well as watching ghost movies to research horror pacing. He also read some of Wraith: The Oblivion in preparation – a tabletop role-playing game about ghosts, set in the same universe as Vampire: The Masquerade – but prioritized making the Ocean House Hotel feel like a traditional haunted house story. The horror was designed with the mindset that dreadful anticipation is scarier than jump scares and gore; Mitsoda argued that monsters are scarier when they are not seen frequently, citing the films Jaws (1975) and Alien (1979) as examples.

== Reception and legacy ==
The Ocean House Hotel has been well received by critics, players and video game developers alike, and is often called one of the best and most well known parts of Bloodlines; in 2004, it won GameSpy's award for the best level of the year in PC games, with praise directed at the way it makes "age-old Halloween scares" feel fresh. PC Gamer writer Jody Macgregor called it a "great moment" in PC gaming. They called it "inspired" due to its sound design, such as the use of "footsteps in the distance" and "whispering voices" as well as its "creepy" music. They also praised it for how the area progressively drains the character's health without giving an opportunity to recover any due to the lack of people to feed on. Easy Allies writer Isla Hinck regarded Ocean House Hotel as one of her favorite levels in video games, considering it a "standout" of the game and praising it for its horror. In the book Music in Video games, its authors praised it for the lack of loading screens ensured that players' anxiety levels would rise without interruption. They noted the dramatic lighting, describing it as "dark, dingy," and "putrid green," which they felt reflected the "uncanny, decrepit, and cold nature" of the hotel.

Eurogamer writer Lewis Denby praised the hotel level for its subtlety, citing how it doles out story information slowly using environmental design and objects placed throughout the hotel. They also appreciated how the terror of the hotel was less of there being an enemy to encounter, and more the uninviting atmosphere. Allen Rausch of GameSpy considered it one of the scariest moments in gaming, noting how ironic it is that an area haunted by ghosts would be scarier than the vampires populating Bloodlines. They discussed how it used "cliché" haunted house concepts, such as the lights flickering, threatening messages scrawled on the walls, and haunting whispering, effectively frighten players.

In a feature about influential immersive sim games worth studying for game developers, Dishonored gameplay programmer Kain Shin highlighted the Ocean House Hotel in particular, According to Christian Schlütter, the senior producer for the in-development sequel to Bloodlines, a similarly horror-focused area and quest is developed for Bloodlines 2 due to the positive player response to the Ocean House Hotel.
