= The Past Presents the Future (album) =

Studio album by Her Space Holiday
- Released: 2005
- Genre: Indie-Electronica
- Length: 41:31
- Labels: Wichita Recordings (US/Europe); V2 Records (Europe) & Records/Neoplex Records (Japan)
- Producer: Marc Bianchi

Her Space Holiday chronology
The Young Machines Remixed (2004)	The Past Presents the Future (2005)	The Telescope (2006)

The Past Presents the Future is an album by Her Space Holiday. It was released September 27, 2005 on Wichita Recordings.

== Reception ==
Professional ratings
Aggregate scores
Source	Rating
Metacritic	60/100
Review scores
Source	Rating
AllMusic	2.5/5 stars
Pitchfork Media	(4.7/10.0)

Johnny Loftus of AllMusic drew positive comparisons to the Dandy Warhols and OMD, but concluded that "Past Presents the Future falters between a coalesced pop sound and its pristine fragments".

== Track listing ==
1. "Forever and a Day" - 3:49
2. "Missed Medicine" - 3:46
3. "The Weight of the World" - 5:00
4. "Self Helpless" - 3:55
5. "You and Me" - 4:36
6. "A Small Setback to a Great Comeback" - 2:26
7. "The Good People of Everywhere" - 4:45
8. "A Match Made in Texas" - 4:02
9. "The Great Parade" - 4:49
10. "The Past Presents the Future" - 4:19
