= Thief (series) =

Series of action-adventure stealth video games

- Logo used in the first three games
- Genres: Stealth, Immersive sim
- Developers: Looking Glass Studios (1998–2000); Ion Storm (2004); Eidos-Montréal (2014–present)
- Publishers: Eidos Interactive (1998–2004); Square Enix (2014–2022); CDE Entertainment (2022–)
- Platforms: Microsoft Windows, PlayStation 3, PlayStation 4, Xbox, Xbox 360, Xbox One, Steam VR, Meta Quest, PlayStation VR2
- First release: Thief: The Dark Project; December 1, 1998
- Latest release: Thief VR: Legacy of Shadow; December 4, 2025

Thief is a series of stealth video games in which the player takes the role of Garrett, a master thief in a fantasy steampunk world resembling a cross between the Late Middle Ages and the Victorian era, with more advanced technologies interspersed.

The series consists of Thief: The Dark Project (1998), Thief II: The Metal Age (2000), Thief: Deadly Shadows (2004), Thief (2014) and Thief VR: Legacy of Shadow (2025). An expanded version of Thief: The Dark Project, titled Thief Gold, was released in 1999 and features three extra maps and a number of bug fixes. Looking Glass Studios developed both The Dark Project and The Metal Age. After the studio had gone out of business in 2000, many former employees moved to Ion Storm and began developing the third part of the series, Deadly Shadows. Eidos-Montréal was subsequently given the reins for Thief. The Thief series has been well-received by critics.

== Gameplay ==
Set mainly in a first-person perspective within a 3D environment, the main gameplay tactic of the Thief series is to avoid fights, stealthily traverse the environment to complete specific objectives and instead sneak around the enemies or discreetly subdue them, without raising too much noise or suspicion. The Thief games are sometimes described as either a "first-person sneaker", "sneak-em-up" or a "first-person looter" to emphasize this difference. Classification of the game has been slow coming, as three-dimensional stealth games, such as Tom Clancy's Splinter Cell and Assassin's Creed, only became more common years after the first Thief. Another innovation employed extensively by Thief is the careful use of sound effects as an integral part of gameplay. Sound cues not only tell the player of other characters in the vicinity, but also indicate how much noise Garrett makes when moving about an area. Too much noise can alert nearby guards, who will grow suspicious and come looking for intruders. There are a variety of tactics to avoid being heard, however, such as walking gently, steering clear of noisy pavement, or using moss arrows to create a carpet that muffles the sound of footsteps. In a similar vein, using light and dark became one of the most important strategies. A gauge at the bottom of the screen (called the 'Light Gem') indicates how visible the protagonist is. Entering deeper shadows or ducking makes the character less likely to be noticed. Walking about increases the risk of being spotted, and having a sword or bow drawn makes him very conspicuous in the game. The astute player is constantly keeping an eye on areas of light or shadow, guard patrol routes, and the type of terrain they are walking on, in case a hiding place is needed in a hurry. A light source, such as a torch or gas lamp, can be doused with a Water Arrow, creating an area of darkness in which the player may hide. Electrically powered lights, in all games, may simply be shut off by using a nearby switch or button; however, if no light switch is available, the electrical light will not turn off by simply shooting a Fire/Water/Blunt Arrow at it. In Thief: Deadly Shadows, the player can simply 'pinch out' a lit candle by pressing the use button on it. A guard or any civilian may notice if a light source has been put out, and also if something valuable has been stolen.

Another large component of the gameplay in Thief, along with the stealth, is exploration. In most missions, especially in the first two Thief games, players can freely explore the game environment without much hindrance. Players are also free to experiment with their approach towards the AI. They may choose to neutralize all the AI-controlled guards using a variety of methods. These methods include using a player-equipped blackjack to quietly incapacitate enemies without killing them, a sword, used in direct combat which can kill enemies, or broadhead arrows, used to discreetly kill enemies from a long distance. Other special arrows, such as water arrows, rope arrows and moss arrows are also available to use. The player may also choose to avoid any confrontation with the AI altogether. "Ghosting" is a play style by which one attempts to complete all objectives in each mission without leaving a trace and without being seen or heard.

== Games ==
Release timeline Main series in bold
1998	**Thief: The Dark Project**
1999
2000	**Thief II: The Metal Age**
2001–2003
2004	**Thief: Deadly Shadows**
2005–2013
2014	**Thief**
2015–2024
2025	**Thief VR: Legacy of Shadow**

Aggregate review scores
Game	Metacritic
Thief: The Dark Project	(PC) 92/100
Thief II: The Metal Age	(PC) 87/100
Thief: Deadly Shadows	(PC) 85/100 (Xbox) 82/100
Thief	(PC) 70/100 (PS4) 67/100 (XONE) 69/100

=== Thief: The Dark Project (1998) ===
Thief: The Dark Project was released by Looking Glass Studios in late 1998 and powered by their own in-house developed Dark Engine. A re-release of Thief: The Dark Project entitled Thief Gold fixed various bugs and added three new levels (mostly derived from, but not identical to, content that was planned for the original game but cut for budget or time constraints) which contributed significantly to the existing plot. The package also contains bonus content such as the DromEd Dark Engine editor, a behind-the-scenes "making of" video, and a desktop theme designed for Windows 98. Looking Glass was working on a similar re-release of Thief II: The Metal Age, provisionally entitled Thief II Gold, at the time they went out of business in 2000.

=== Thief II: The Metal Age (2000) ===
Looking Glass Studios released the sequel to Thief in early 2000. Utilizing the same Dark Engine that powered the original Thief, Thief II had an almost identical look and feel, with at some points differences in architecture and technology caused by the events of the first game, and only minor graphic and programming improvements, such as colored lighting. The basic gameplay was also fundamentally similar to the original Thief, but many new elements had been added, including technological gadgets such as a remote eye camera. Other changes include an increase in the number of AI behaviors. Responding to criticism of the original Thief that more time was spent on combat than actually living up to the title of the game, the missions in Thief II were designed much more around typical thief-like behavior, and much of the game is spent robbing the rich denizens of the City rather than battling monsters. In fact, the player encounters almost none of the monsters from the original Thief except for burrick (dinosaur-like creatures) heads mounted as trophies in some of the mansions, and a few zombies, undead and ghostly apparitions. The designers stated that, unlike the original Thief, where levels were developed to suit the plot, in Thief II levels were designed first and making the plot work with them was somewhat of a retrofit. A re-release of Thief II: The Metal Age entitled Thief II Gold was a game in development by Looking Glass Studios before the company closed down in 2000. It is believed to have been an expansion to Thief II similar to Thief Gold.

=== Thief: Deadly Shadows (2004) ===
A major departure from the first two games in the series, Thief: Deadly Shadows was developed by Ion Storm rather than Looking Glass Studios (albeit with many of the same people). The game was powered by the Unreal-based Deus Ex: Invisible War engine. Unlike the original two games, the third Thief was developed simultaneously for Windows and the Xbox. Because of all these factors, Thief: Deadly Shadows was different (and vastly updated) from the first two games in the series in both appearance and gameplay. One of the game's major new features was the ability to explore the City. While previous games sent Garrett straight from mission to mission, Thief: Deadly Shadows allows him to walk the City streets between missions, where he can steal from passersby, spy on the townspeople's daily lives, and search for sidequests in addition to major story missions. Unlike sandbox games such as Grand Theft Auto III, the city is not one large continuous map, but rather several small neighborhood maps connected by load zones (similar to Postal 2). The game also introduced an ability to switch between first- and third-person views, and to flatten against walls. In addition, the lighting engine was updated to accommodate moving shadows and light sources, which dynamically affected where the player could hide, an innovation originally precluded by the more technically limited Dark Engine. Smaller improvements were made to AI behavior, allowing for guards who noted when items went missing from their field of view or when doors were left open, along with an overhauled sound-propagation mechanic.

=== Thief (2014) ===
Thief is the fourth game in the Thief series, developed by Eidos-Montréal and published by Square Enix. Since early 2008, several rumors had been circulating regarding a fourth Thief game, which was allegedly under development. Eidos-Montréal's General Manager Stéphane D'Astous commented in an interview for Deus Ex: Human Revolution that confirmation of the company's second "AAA title", which its website states "begins with the letter 'T'", would occur "over the next year" or so. The game was unveiled on May 11, 2009, originally titled as Thief 4.

=== Thief VR: Legacy of Shadow (2025) ===
Thief VR: Legacy of Shadow is the fifth game in the Thief series, developed by Maze Theory and was published by Vertigo Games in December 2025. This time the protagonist is a girl nicknamed Magpie, who was able to get Garrett's mechanical eye. The game is only available for virtual reality headsets such as Steam VR, Quest and PlayStation VR2.

== Setting ==
The universe of Thief is a dark fantasy setting and is centered mostly on a dense, sprawling metropolitan complex known only as "The City", which has some resemblance to 18th/19th century London, but with an altogether more medieval culture, reflected in the architecture, style of dress, semi-feudal social structure, and a lack of firearms but widespread use of magic. It is a steampunk metropolis constantly being fought over by a corrupt aristocracy, an order of religious fanatics and a horde of vengeful woodland beings, all under the eye of a secret organization. The world is highly superstitious and does have a noticeable problem with the supernatural and the undead are very common. Technology is unnaturally varied in a way that they have access to electricity and use it for light and industry but nothing else. The method of how electricity is generated is unknown as well, electricity was common 50 years before Garret was born but the steam boiler was only invented shortly before the events of Thief II: The Metal Age. Thief takes place hundreds of years after the original games, possibly with a heavier emphasis on the identity of "The City". Garrett works with the underground economy of the City, making a lucrative living for himself. Occasionally Garrett would leave the confines of the City and rob mansions, prisons, or graveyards.

== Characters ==
The following are recurring characters. Information on non-recurring characters may be found in Thief: The Dark Project, Thief II and Thief: Deadly Shadows.

=== Garrett ===
Garrett is the protagonist of the series. Introduced in Thief: The Dark Project, he was trained by the Keepers in secret so that he could join them; instead, Garrett used those skills to become a master thief. The 2014 reboot Thief introduced a reimagining of Garrett, with motivations and a personality that differ from those of the original. Garrett is played by voice actor Stephen Russell in the first three games and is played by Romano Orzari in the 2014 reboot.

==== Development ====
Ken Levine, when working on The Dark Project's story, wanted the game's world to feel familiar to fantasy fans, but also to have a film noir aesthetic. In keeping with this, Levine came up with a character named "Palmer": a private detective hired to do a job by a beautiful woman. Feeling that there was a lack of anti-heroes in gaming at the time, Levine took inspiration from films from the 1970's such as Blade Runner and Chinatown, keeping the protagonist a character with a failed past "living on the outs of society". As the character evolved into Garrett, he wanted to see how "dark" the character could be, taking whatever job was offered to him, including assassination. However, this was toned down after objections from other developers, which frustrated Levine, though he later admitted he felt it was the right direction to take the character. Garrett's character design itself was carried over from a previous Looking Glass Studios project, Dark Camelot. Developed by Marc Lizotte and Rob Waters, it was originally more "armory and Excalibur-looking", but as development progressed they changed his look to fit the fantasy setting and "into something meaner and leaner".

A reimagining of the character appears in the 2014 reboot. Randy Smith, a designer on the original trilogy, suggested to the studio of creating a new character instead of using Garrett:

I was like, "Why don't you guys just make your own character? If you really want to expand this franchise, show us a different person who's similar to Garrett in this world, but has their own characteristics. Just give him a different name." That would have been interesting to me, to explore more of the world.

==== Reception ====
The character was well received by critics. In 1999, GameSpot included him on the list of top ten heroes in gaming, stating how "over the course of his adventures, Garrett emerges from under the misanthropic facade as a character with a noble heart, whose immoral ways are reluctantly justified by an immoral talent that's well suited to his immoral world". GameSpot also chose him as one of the 64 contenders in the 2009 user poll "All Time Greatest Video Game Hero". In 2010, GamesTM listed him among the greatest ever game characters, commenting that "few main characters are as cynical and mysterious as Garrett" and adding that "it's Garrett's unique skills and upbringing that make him such a fascinating character". In 2011, Empire ranked him as the 29th greatest video-game character, calling him to "a medieval Han Solo type" and adding that it is "his sardonic amorality that shines through most of all, ensuring Garrett a place as one of gaming's most appealing anti-heroes". In 2008, PC Zone ranked him as PC gaming's ninth best character for his "wonderful" situational sarcasm, calling him a "medieval Sam Fisher of sorts" and contrasting him with Marcus Fenix (who was ranked as ninth worst). That same year, Garrett got an honorable mention on the list of the best Xbox Heroes by 360 Magazine along with a comment that Garrett "was highly unfortunate not to make the final 50" in the user poll.

In 2012, IGN featured him among gaming's most notorious anti-heroes, calling him "a true badass and anti-hero, combining a ruthless exterior with an unshakeable sense of honor". GameSpy's Mike Sharkey called Garrett a noticeable omission from the 2011 Guinness World Records Gamer's Edition's top 50 video-game characters. Also in 2012, GamesRadar ranked this "not exactly Robin Hood" as 35th "most memorable, influential, and badass" protagonist in games, also calling him "a pioneer of sorts, paving the way for the myriad other thieves and assassins of our time". In a 2021 list published by PC Gamer staff, Garrett is ranked among the most iconic characters in PC gaming.

=== Viktoria ===
Viktoria (voiced by Terri Brosius) is a wood nymph in the series. She was a primary antagonist during the events of The Dark Project, being the one to remove Garrett's eye. However, she and her followers become allies for Garrett's war on the Mechanists during Metal Age. Initially there is little trust on Garrett's part, but over time she is able to gain Garrett's respect, loyalty and, uncharacteristically of the cynical thief, care. The two gradually grow closer over the course of working together, even to the point of Garrett being willing to defend her directly by rushing to her aid upon her ill-fated assault on Soulforge, and being noticeably upset when he is unable to save her. It seems that this degree of respect and general sentiment on Garrett's part is only seen in his relationships with Viktoria and the Keeper Artemus.

The character was well received. In 2000, Viktoria was included in GameSpot's list of the ten best female characters according to readers' choice, with the staff commenting: "Viktoria didn't make our TenSpot, which was a shame. We editors apologize to those of you who lamented our oversight". It was also accompanied by a poll asking who should play Viktoria in the movie adaptation of the Thief games (Catherine Zeta-Jones, Elizabeth Hurley, Salma Hayek or Jennifer Lopez). In 2007, Tom's Games included this "bad girl with charisma and style" on the list of the 50 greatest female characters in video game history, noting how she "evolves from a deceptive villain in the first game to a more benevolent companion to Garrett in the sequel, which ends her heroic, sacrificial death" and applauding her "hypnotic voice" provided by Brosius. Tom's Games stated she should be played in the live-action adaptation by "Naomi Watts, who's got the sexy voice, beauty and charisma for the part".

=== Other characters ===
- Keeper Artemus – The Keeper and mentor who took Young Garrett in and taught him in Thief: The Dark Project. Artemus is the main point of contact between Garrett and the Keepers throughout the series and attempts to enlist his help with the various Keeper prophecies, much to Garrett's reluctance. He holds genuine affection for Garrett, in spite of Garrett's rejection of the Keeper ways, and carries a strong independent and rebellious streak of his own. Artemus also appears to be the only Keeper whose stealth skills rival Garrett's and occasionally manages to sneak up on him. Artemus is believed to have been killed towards the end of Thief: Deadly Shadows.
- Keeper Orland – A member of the Keeper organization with a strong dislike of Garrett. Orland eventually becomes the leader of the Keepers in Thief: Deadly Shadows. His leadership quickly proves officious, bureaucratic, and secretive, and Garrett quickly learns to dislike him. He first appeared in Thief II: The Metal Age, albeit voiced by a different actor.
- Interpreter Caduca – An old woman in the Keeper organization in charge of reading and interpreting the Glyph Prophecies. Prophecies are central to the Keepers' work, so Caduca plays a very important role in the organization, and even the Keeper leader listens to her advice. In reality, Caduca is relatively young. Prolonged exposure to the Glyphs causes accelerated aging, an effect which limits the amount of knowledge and power any single Keeper can obtain from studying the Glyphs. Caduca is the Spanish feminine word for "decrepit, obsolete" or the Portuguese word for "old, obsolete". She is murdered by The Hag in Thief: Deadly Shadows.
- Translator Gamall – Caduca's assistant, an eerie pale and emotionless girl who translates Caduca's interpretations into English. As the Translator, Gamall will succeed Caduca as interpreter when Caduca is no longer able to fulfill her duties. Gamall turns out to be a guise of The Hag.
- "Benny" – A recurring drunkard guard whose mood swings and amusing ramblings endeared him to many fans of the series. The name is informal, but comes from a specific drunken guard in the Sheriff's mansion during the Metal Age. The character's voice is used for a number of different guards throughout the series. In Thief: Deadly Shadows he is at one point called "Sinclair". Several "episodes" of a series of conversations called "Benny's Ailment" can also be listened to in Deadly Shadows.
- Basso the Boxman – An acquaintance of Garrett's whom he rescued from a Hammerite prison, although this uncharacteristic act of kindness was merely performed because Garrett had his eye on Basso's sister, who he hoped would be "grateful". Garrett also helps to rescue Basso's betrothed Jeneviere from indentured servitude in the first mission of Thief II: The Metal Age.

== Game editing ==
With the release of DromEd, a map editor for the first two games, an active community of fans began providing a wealth of home-grown missions for the first two games. Thousands of fan missions for these games have been created, some equally or more complex than the original game missions. These fan missions can be played by other fans using a loader. T3Ed, a map editor for the third game Deadly Shadows, was released in February 2005 after a letter-writing campaign by fans. This allows fans to design their level with all the interactive objects seen in original missions, as well as place stealable loot and lighting, factors which drastically affect gameplay. Human NPCs and creatures from all the various factions can be added into missions, and their behaviors (such as patrol routes) configured. Missions may be packaged and distributed to other players, who need a loader to play them.

== Film ==
In 2016, Straight Up Films acquired the film rights to Thief with plans to develop a movie, Adam Mason and Simon Boyes to write the screenplay, Straight Up Films' President of Production Sandra Condito serving as executive producer along with Khalid Jones of Source Rock and Square Enix while Straight Up principals Marisa Polvino and Kate Cohen to produce alongside Roy Lee and Adrian Askarieh.

In 2015, Adrian Askarieh, producer of the Hitman films, stated that he hoped to oversee a shared universe of Square Enix films with Just Cause, Hitman, Tomb Raider, Deus Ex, and Thief, but admitted that he does not have the rights to Tomb Raider. In May 2017, the Game Central reporters at Metro UK suggested that the shared universe was unlikely, pointing out that no progress had been made on any Just Cause, Deus Ex nor Thief films.

== See also ==
- Thievery UT – Multiplayer mod based on the gameplay from the Thief series
- The Dark Mod – A free stealth game inspired by the Thief series
