= Randy Smith (game designer) =

American video game designer (born 1974)

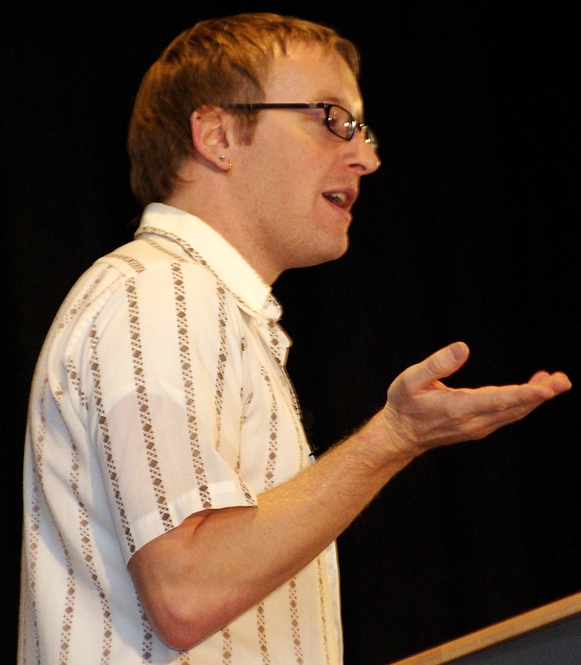
- Smith in November 2007
- Born: June 14, 1974 (age 51); United States
- Occupation: Video game designer
- Known for: Thief series

Randy Smith (born June 14, 1974) is an American video game designer. He co-owns and is the creative director of Tiger Style. He has worked extensively on the Thief series with both Looking Glass Studios and Ion Storm.

Smith started Tiger Style in 2009 and shipped the award-winning game Spider: The Secret of Bryce Manor on iOS, followed by Waking Mars and Spider: Rite of the Shrouded Moon. He spent time on the Steven Spielberg collaboration code-named LMNO at EA Los Angeles studio, which was eventually canceled. Smith has lectured on game design at GDC, and additionally, Smith has participated in the Indie Game Jam.

Between 2007 and 2013, Smith wrote a monthly column called "The Possibility Space" for Edge in the UK.

== Games credited ==
Year	Title	Developer
1998	Thief: The Dark Project	Looking Glass Studios
2000	Thief II: The Metal Age	Looking Glass Studios
2004	Thief: Deadly Shadows	Ion Storm
2006	Dark Messiah of Might and Magic	Arkane Studios
Cancelled	LMNO	EA; Arkane Studios
2009	Spider: The Secret of Bryce Manor	Tiger Style
2012	Waking Mars	Tiger Style
2015	Spider: Rite of the Shrouded Moon	Tiger Style
2021	Jett: The Far Shore (2021)	Superbrothers; Pine Scented Software
TBA	Project C	Darewise Entertainment
