= Thief: Deadly Shadows =

2004 video game

- North American cover art
- Developer: Ion Storm
- Publisher: Eidos Interactive
- Director: Randy Smith
- Producer: Denise Fulton
- Designer: Jordan Thomas
- Programmer: Ian Dunlop
- Artist: Sergio Rosas
- Writer: Terri Brosius
- Composer: Eric Brosius
- Series: Thief
- Engine: Unreal Engine 2
- Platforms: Windows, Xbox
- Release: NA: May 25, 2004; EU: June 11, 2004
- Genre: Stealth
- Mode: Single-player

Thief: Deadly Shadows is a 2004 stealth video game developed by Ion Storm for Microsoft Windows and Xbox that was released in 2004, on May 25 in North America and on June 11 in Europe. It is the third video game in the Thief series.

In Thief: Deadly Shadows the player takes the role of Garrett, a master thief. It is set in a fantasy world resembling the Late Middle Ages with more advanced steampunk technologies interspersed. One of the game's major new features was the ability to explore the City. While previous games sent Garrett straight from mission to mission, Thief: Deadly Shadows allows him to walk the City streets between missions where he can steal from passersby, spy on the townspeople's daily lives, and search for side quests in addition to major story missions. The game also introduced an ability to switch between first and third person views, and to flatten against walls.

Development for both platforms started simultaneously. Thief: Deadly Shadows received generally positive reviews, albeit not as critically successful as its predecessors. A reboot of the Thief series, Thief, was released by Eidos Montréal in 2014.

== Gameplay ==
Garrett sneaking through the "South Quarter", an area in the expansive city complex featured in Deadly Shadows

Thief: Deadly Shadows is a first-person and third-person 'sneaker', similar in gameplay to the previous games in the series. The player takes the role of Garrett, an independent master thief who aims to steal his way through the City, using stealth, devices and weapons, in order to complete objectives and make profits on the side. The player may steal from or mug innocents for loot, and avoid, distract, attack or knock out guards. Loot and weapon ammunition may be stolen simply by 'touching' it, when close enough. Locked rooms and chests can be broken into after completing a lock-picking minigame.

Mission levels may be traversed by sneaking through the shadows, since walking or running will alert nearby guards, who detecting the presence of a vandal will search around for an unknown face. Upon discovering the player, the guards will give chase and possibly hunt them down. In order to make minimum noise, the player must actively monitor the noise each action creates. The player may usually view a hand-drawn map of the immediate surroundings; realistically, the player's location is not indicated on the map and must be deduced from the surrounding landmarks. The game has a fairly open-ended structure, allowing the player to approach every objective in multiple different ways. Upon completion of all objectives, the mission ends and the plot is further revealed through cutscenes. Due to limited memory, city and mission levels are divided into parts connected by load zones.

After each mission, the player reappears into the nearest district within the City, which may be freely explored by foot. Most civilians do not recognize Garrett as a criminal, although wanted posters are frequently visible on City walls. City areas unlock as the player progresses through missions. Within the City, the player may sell previously stolen goods on the black market to fences, for gold, which can be used at various shops to purchase weapons, equipment and supplies. Special loot such as artifacts cannot be sold but are involved in the objectives and plot. As they are collected, loot, gold, equipment and weapons are retained in the player's inventory through the game, making it possible to 'hoard' for later use. While exploring the City, the player may break into homes for additional loot, spy on and steal from the townspeople, and complete the occasional side quest. Allying with major factions will motivate its members to fight alongside the player, against the City Watch guards.

Both the PC and Xbox versions of the game are relatively easy to play, with conventional and reconfigurable shooter-style controls. The first mission is an interactive tutorial that guides the player through a typical robbery, set in an inn. The player may save progress at any point, and must do so manually from time to time, since the game never autosaves. The Xbox version has considerably more tactile controls since it uses a game controller instead of an all purpose keyboard. Within the lock-picking minigame, a rumble effect can be felt based on the relation between the lock picks and tumblers. Movement of the right analog stick also allows Garrett to turn his head while picking locks, allowing the player to survey their surroundings and pick locks simultaneously. Moving the left analog stick gently makes Garrett creep, and forcefully makes him run.

== Plot ==
The game begins when Garrett steals a rare opal from a nobleman's castle. After fencing it, he is contacted by Keeper Artemus, who offers Garrett access to the Keeper Prophecies if he brings to the Keepers two Artifacts: The Builder's Chalice and the Jacknall's Paw, which is kept by the Hammerites and the Pagans, respectively. After learning of a coming "Dark Age", Garrett steals an ancient book, the Compendium of Reproach, that details more about the event, along with a third Artifact called the Kurshok Crown. The Keepers read the Compendium's prophecy, which mentions that an "evil one" will be revealed when time ceases to exist. Garrett suspects that the prophecy might refer to the city's clocktower, rather than time itself, and sabotages the clock, inadvertently causing the tower to collapse.

Caduca, the Keepers' Interpreter of the Prophecies, is found murdered. Keeper Orland blames Garrett, and fixes a trial where Garrett is found guilty. Garrett escapes, causing Orland to send the Keeper Enforcers, an elite unit of assassins, after Garrett. Garrett eludes them and is contacted by a group of sympathetic Keepers, who mention that the clocktower's rubble formed an arrow which points towards the Keeper Library at their compound. With Orland planning to promote a young girl named Gamall to replace Caduca, and believing Orland's betrayal is foretold in Keeper prophecy, Garrett journeys to the library for evidence. He encounters a mysterious old woman, who uses Glyph magic in an attempt to kill Garrett, but he escapes. Garrett visits Inspector Drept of the Hammerites for answers, and Drept identifies the woman as the Hag, a monstrous folklore creature. Drept advises Garrett to search the abandoned Shalebridge Cradle, having seen the Hag there as a child. The Cradle had formerly been an orphanage and an insane asylum, but has long been abandoned after a fire which killed its inhabitants.

At the Cradle, Garrett finds a spirit named Lauryl, who resembles Gamall in appearance. Lauryl beckons Garrett to help her trapped spirit leave the Cradle by removing traces of her from it. While successful, Garrett finds he is not able to leave the Cradle, as it remembers him. Garrett enters the past and tricks the Cradle into thinking that he had committed suicide by jumping out of a window. Lauryl leads Garrett to her tomb, which is covered in Glyphs left by Gamall. It is revealed Gamall killed Lauryl and obtained her appearance through the Glyphs for the purpose of becoming Interpreter in order to harness Glyphs and destroy the Keepers. Garrett removes the Glyphs on the tomb with Lauryl's blood, and Gamall, about to become Interpreter in a ceremony, is revealed as a monster. She attacks the Keepers and flees.

Gamall finds the Final Glyph, which is capable of annulling all glyph magic, and steals the Chalice and the Paw from the Keepers. Finding Gamall's underground lair, Garrett retrieves the Chalice and the Paw. He discovers that the five Keeper Artifacts must be placed in specific locations around the City to activate the Final Glyph, which Gamall intends to destroy. Garrett goes to the Wieldstrom Museum and steals the remaining Artifacts. Outside, Artemus instructs Garrett to hand over the Artifacts, but is revealed to be Gamall in disguise, who kills Orland. Garrett positions the Artifacts to activate the Final Glyph, causing all Glyph magic to end, while Gamall becomes a powerless old woman. In the final scene, Garrett catches a young girl attempting to pickpocket him, and repeats the words spoken by Artemus to Garrett as a young boy. (Note: As seen in The Dark Project)

== Development ==
=== Origins ===
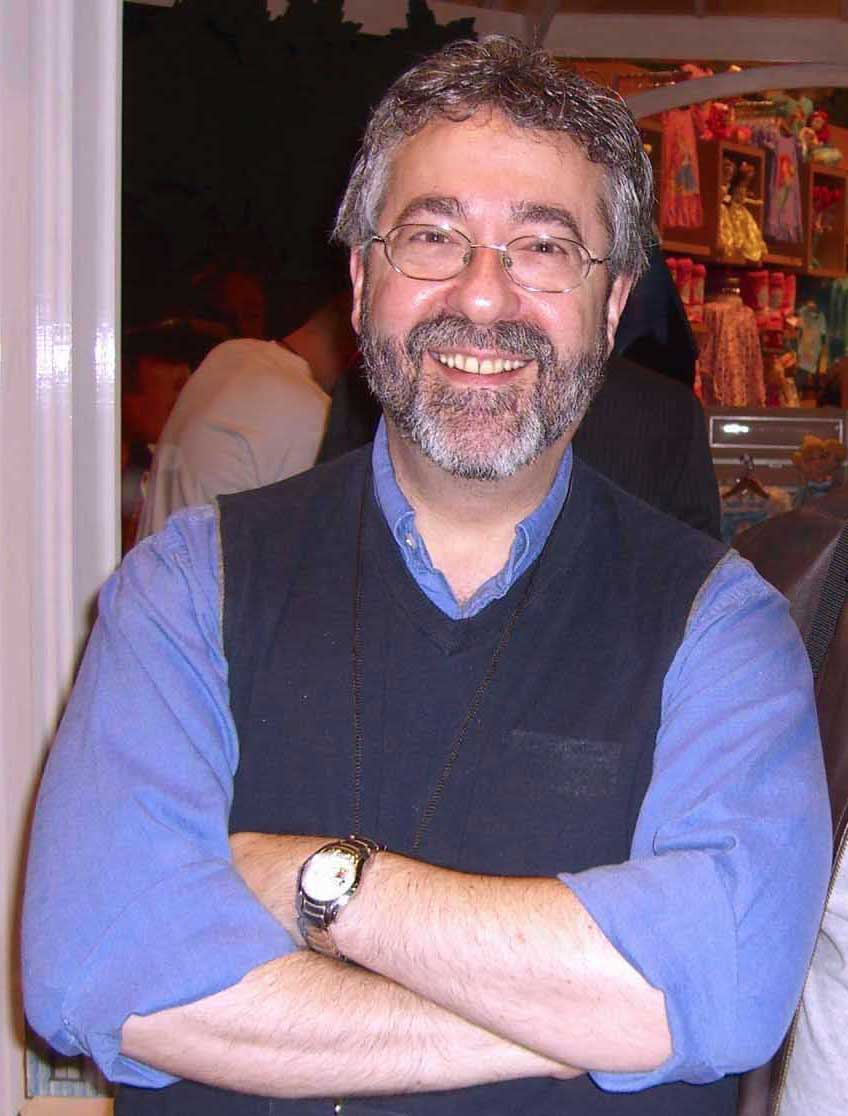
Warren Spector's company, Ion Storm Austin, took over development of Thief III after the closure of Looking Glass Studios.

During the production of Thief II: The Metal Age, developer Looking Glass Studios fell into serious financial turmoil. This led to the company's closure in May 2000, a few months after Thief II's release. However, the Thief series had been planned as a trilogy, and work on Thief III was "in a fairly advanced stage" when the company closed, according to PC Zone's Keith Pullin. Thief II designers Randy Smith and Terri Brosius had been appointed as lead designers on Thief III, and they had done several months of concept work for the project. According to Smith, the game was planned to take place in an "open-ended, self-directed city", and its plot was intended to focus on the Keepers. Brosius explained that the game would have seen Garrett grow as a person and become "ready to give, rather than always take." The player would have uncovered the plot gradually, while exploring a free-roam environment. Following the bankruptcy of Looking Glass, the Thief intellectual property was liquidated and the future of Thief III became unclear.

In August 2000, Thief publisher Eidos Interactive announced that it had purchased the rights to Thief, and that Thief III would be developed by Ion Storm. The Austin, Texas team, led by Warren Spector, had just completed Deus Ex. Spector explained that Eidos would have given Thief III to Core Design or Crystal Dynamics had he not accepted it. The game was initially announced for Windows and the PlayStation 2. Ion Storm began by gathering a core team to design and plot the game, composed in part of ex-Looking Glass employees. Four key members of the Thief II team—Randy Smith, Emil Pagliarulo, Lulu Lamer and Terri Brosius—were hired to begin the project. Others agreed to consult. After completing the core team in mid-August, Spector announced that pre-production would begin in September. The team's plan was to "wrap up [the] loose ends" of the series.

Thief III underwent six months of pre-production, which the team entered with the intention of facilitating a faster, more combat-based playstyle than in previous Thief games. Their main goal was to create an "immersive simulation" that maximized player agency. Smith, the project leader, stated in December that pre-production was "going well", and he noted that Ion Storm was developing an early test demo. The game's team was being filled out in preparation for full production. According to Smith, the Thief III design and story concepts created at Looking Glass were used as the basis for the game. However, the team opted not to use the "Siege" engine that Looking Glass had been developing for the game, partly because Ion Storm could not reunite the engine's original programming team. Instead, the company licensed and modified Epic Games' Unreal Engine 2. Thief III was developed from the beginning as a cross-platform release for Windows and the Xbox.

=== Production ===
Visiting Ion Storm in May 2001, Chuck Osborn of PC Gamer US reported that Thief III had "just barely" started production. The same voice actor, Stephen Russell, was selected for the lead character, Garrett. Unlike the original two titles, Deadly Shadows was developed simultaneously for Windows and the Xbox. The game is powered by a heavily modified and tweaked version of Unreal Engine 2, which Ion Storm had previously used in Deus Ex: Invisible War. The engine made considerable improvements to both the lighting and sound engines, two important elements of Thief's core gameplay. For the first time in the series, the player was able to hide in shadows that could dynamically move based on adjacent light sources. The sound propagation system found in Deadly Shadows allowed for more subtle variances in determining whether the player could be heard by enemies, based on architecture of a room, presence of doors and windows, the material said doors and windows were constructed of, and whether those doors and windows were open or closed.

Ion Storm decided not to call the game Thief III for fear that it would alienate those who had never played the previous two titles. It is the last game produced by Ion Storm before its demise in February 2005.

== Reception ==
Reception

Aggregate score
Aggregator	Score
Metacritic	(PC) 85/100 (XBOX) 82/100

Review scores
Publication	Score
GameSpot	8.3/10
GameSpy	4/5

Thief: Deadly Shadows received "generally positive" reviews, according to review aggregator Metacritic.

The editors of Computer Gaming World nominated Deadly Shadows for their 2004 "Action Game of the Year" award, which ultimately went to The Chronicles of Riddick: Escape from Butcher Bay. It was also a runner-up for Computer Games Magazine's list of the 10 best computer games of 2004. However, the game won the magazine's special award for "Best Sound Effects". The PC version of Deadly Shadows won GameSpy's 2004 "Best Sound" award.

Despite positive reviews, Thief: Deadly Shadows failed to meet financial targets and may have led to the cancellation of a follow-up title: Thief 4: Dagger of Ways.

In a 2023 interview Randy Smith reflected on the game and said he was most proud of the open world segments: "That was a pretty good accomplishment, to be able to pull that off in addition to ramping up a new team, switching to consoles, and just building another Thief game."
