= Tiger Style =

American independent video game studio

- Founded: 2008
- Founders: David Kalina; Randy Smith
- Services: Video Game Studio
- Website: www.tigerstylegames.com

Tiger Style is an American independent video game studio. The studio was founded by industry veterans Randy Smith and David Kalina in 2008. Their first title Spider: The Secret of Bryce Manor, was released in August 2009, followed by Waking Mars in 2012. They are a fully independent collective of designers, artists, and musicians. The studio is known for working remotely, and is known for their cooperative pay structure, distributing royalties among the game production teams.

== List of titles ==
- Spider: The Secret of Bryce Manor (2009)
- Waking Mars (2012)
- Spider: Rite of the Shrouded Moon (2015)
