= Caesar's Legion =

Fictional post-apocalyptic dictatorship

- Fallout organization
- Flag of Caesar's Legion
- First appearance: Fallout: New Vegas (2010)
- Last appearance: Fallout season 2 (2025-26)

In-universe information
- Type: Totalitarian dictatorship
- Founder: Edward Sallow
- Founded: 2247
- Location: Southwestern United States

Caesar's Legion is a post-apocalyptic society in the Fallout franchise. A totalitarian and militaristic dictatorship founded on the ideals of the Roman Empire, the faction first appeared in Fallout: New Vegas as adversaries to the New California Republic, and appeared as antagonists in the Fallout television series, during its second season.

The faction was founded by a group of researchers from the New California Republic (NCR) during a journey to the Grand Canyon to study the area's native tribes and their dialects. After being captured by the Blackfoot tribe, one of the researchers, Edward Sallow, began to teach the tribe's people Roman war tactics and practices that he had studied, and aided the tribe in conquering the surrounding territory in the process. Sallow proclaimed himself as Caesar of the tribe, and renamed it Caesar's Legion. Caesar, alongside Mormon missionary Joshua Graham, began assimilating conquered tribes into the Legion as either soldiers or slaves under Caesar's autocratic laws and barbaric practices.

== Conception and creation ==
Caesar's Legion were originally conceived as a slaver faction intended to appear in Van Buren, the original Fallout 3 developed by Black Isle Studios under Interplay Entertainment, until the game was cancelled in 2003. A version of Caesar's Legion was planned for inclusion in the scrapped Brotherhood of Steel 2. When Obsidian Entertainment began development on New Vegas in 2008, the faction was revisited by Josh Sawyer and Chris Avellone, taking inspiration from Colonel Kurtz from the film Apocalypse Now when writing the character of Edward Sallow. Lead writer John Gonzalez stated that he intended to "present a robust argument for authoritarianism" with Caesar's character, believing that writing a compelling tyrant was required to portray tyranny as a serious threat. The Legion were intended to feature more locations and quests within the final game, however time constraints led to much of the content being cut.

== Structure ==
Caesar's Legion is a totalitarian and militaristic dictatorship which models itself after the Roman Empire and Roman legion, taking inspiration from certain aspects its ethics, language and culture. With a capital based in Flagstaff, the Legion provides safety and structure over the dangerous American Southwest which it has conquered, and allows those under its rule to live as long as one does not question Caesar's orders, such as demanding to be worshipped as the son of Mars, forming a cult of personality in the process to maintain its society. Caesar's Legion heavily utilizes the method of assimilating tribes to conquer territory and strengthen its society, and those within tribes who do not agree to fall under the Legion's banner are either tortured and killed or enslaved.

The Legion adheres by strict gender norms, allowing only men to serve as soldiers and forcing women to serve as slaves who act as helpers and means for reproduction. The faction bars itself from making use of modern medicine and a majority of advanced technology, including robots. The Legion mimics Roman culture in numerous ways, including manufacturing armor sourced from football gear in the style of Roman legionaries, minting their own currency in imitation of Roman coinage, and pronouncing Caesar as "Kai-zar" to mimic classical Latin. Although being majorly inspired by the Roman Empire, the Legion only mimics its aesthetics and superficial details, as it often deviates heavily from historical Roman principles practiced. For example, unlike the Roman Empire, the Legion does not bestow citizenship to those who reside within the faction's territory, and are instead expected to serve and die for Caesar.

== Appearances ==
=== Fallout: New Vegas ===
Caesar's Legion first appeared as a major faction in Fallout: New Vegas, where the faction is depicted at war with the New California Republic (NCR) over control of Hoover Dam, which supplies clean water and energy to whoever controls it. Following the Legion's narrow loss during a battle over the dam in 2277, Joshua Graham, who led the Legion's army in the battle, was immolated and thrown into the Grand Canyon. In the events of the game in 2281, the Legion is formally introduced to the player after coming across the ravaged and decimated remains of Nipton, California. From there, the player can meet Caesar and choose to side with the Legion, aiding the faction in a second battle over Hoover Dam and allowing Caesar to become the ruler of the city of New Vegas, leading the Mojave Wasteland to fall under Legion rule. The player can also allow Caesar to succumb to a brain tumor, leading his second-in-command, Legate Lanius, to become the new Caesar. Alternatively, the player can side with the NCR to fight directly against Caesar's Legion, or decide to block both factions from taking control of the dam. Caesar's Legion play a pivotal role in the plot of New Vegas's Honest Hearts downloadable content, where the violent White Legs tribe, on the behalf of Caesar's Legion, oppose a now reformed Joshua Graham as he watches over the tribes inhabiting Zion National Park.

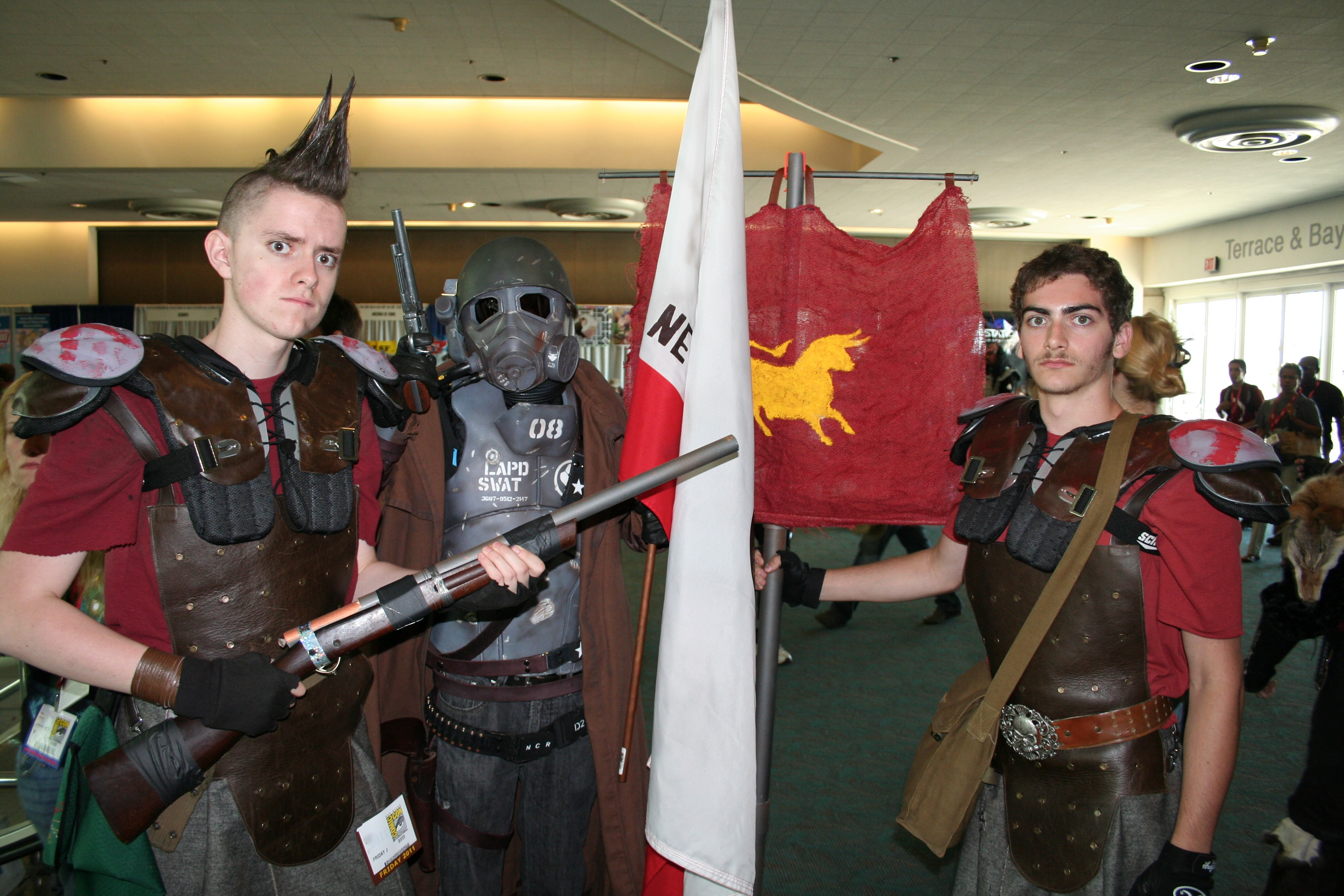
Two cosplayers dressed up as members of Caesar's Legion, alongside an NCR Ranger.

=== Fallout TV series ===
The second season of the series' television adaptation Fallout, which takes place 15 years after the events of Fallout: New Vegas, depicts the faction after the death of Caesar. It is claimed that Caesar had written down the name of his successor on a piece of paper that remains in the pocket of his corpse, which lies in the middle ground between two identical factions with their own two Caesars claiming to be the heir to the Legion, both blocking each other from retrieving the piece of paper. After saving Lucy MacLean (Ella Purnell) from being crucified by the Legion, Cooper Howard (Walton Goggins) incites an explosion which leads both sides of the faction to begin fighting with one other. During the battle, Lacerta Legate (Macaulay Culkin) takes possession of the piece of paper and discovers that the original Caesar did not name a successor, and that he intended for the Legion to die alongside him. As a result, Lacerta Legate decides to crown himself as Caesar as the fighting ends with both previous Caesars dead, and subsequently commands a march to seize New Vegas.

== Promotion and reception ==
Macaulay Culkin's iteration of Caesar, as depicted in the Fallout television series, is featured as part of a series of Fallout-themed Funko Pop figurines released in 2026. Figures based on members of Caesar's Legion were made available for the tabletop board game Fallout: Wasteland Warfare by Modiphius Entertainment in 2018. When reviewing the episode "The Profligate" from Fallout's second season for IGN, Matt Purslow described Caesar's Legion as "wonderful contradiction of incredibly cruel and impossibly silly", and said that Macaulay Culkin's incarnation of Caesar's "aloof, classical theatre tone, perfectly shaved head, and dedication to the Legion’s rules makes him a deadly serious joke."

The depiction of Caesar's Legion in Fallout: New Vegas was described by G4's Christopher Monfette as "a ruthless, power hungry gang of exceptionally well-trailed militiamen[...] whose willingness to scorch the earth and all who live on it is only rivaled by their lust for the land itself", and by Luiz H. C. of Bloody Disgusting as "a violent and expansionist culture led by an authoritarian warlord" whose "cruel ways brought order and stability to much of the American Southwest." Eurogamer's Tony Coles wrote that the faction's depiction in New Vegas "never seems overly sensational, or underscored with villainous cliche", and that "when you meet Caesar, he's terrifyingly sane. His vision is clear, his actions informed by persuasive logic, but his idea of Roman standards of human rights becoming the dominant moral philosophy was repugnant". Daniel Singleton, when writing an essay for The Eternal Future of the 1950s, drew comparisons from Caesar's Legion to sword-and-sandal films such as Quo Cadis, The Robe and Ben-Hur along with "Romanesque civilizations" depicted in Isaac Asimov's Foundation novels and the Star Trek series. Jordan Thomas Christopher, while writing an essay on the comparisons between the Legion and the Roman Empire, stated that Caesar's Legion is "a body of slaves enslaving other slaves, of the tyrannized tyrannizing others, all wrapped in a thoroughly Roman façade which gives brutality for its own sake a claim to legitimacy, but which does not at all resemble Roman reality on deeper inspection." Debopriyaa Dutta, writing for Inverse, described the faction as the most terrifying in the Fallout franchise.

VG247's Kat Baily described the character of Caesar in New Vegas as "a charismatic and often brilliant man with his own vision for reforming the Mojave Wasteland." Richard Cobbett, when writing for Rock Paper Shotgun, wrote that Caesar was initially presented in New Vegas as a "cruel, thuggish despot," before "actually introducing [Caesar] and revealing him to be a well-spoken, thoughtful individual whose plans are rather more considered than they might initially have seemed. And then spinning right round to say that no, despite all his words, he's still a hypocritical and even incompetent monster whose legacy is doomed to collapse in on itself." Cobbett stated that Caesar showcased "some of Obsidian's finest writing" in both technicality and depth of the character's philosophy. Some critics have referred to Caesar as one of the greatest RPG villains of all time.
