= Joshua Graham =

Fictional character from Fallout: New Vegas

- Fallout character
- Joshua Graham from Fallout: New Vegas
- First game: Fallout: New Vegas (2010)
- Designed by: Chris Avellone (Van Buren); Josh Sawyer (New Vegas)
- Voiced by: Keith Szarabajka

In-universe information
- Alias: The Burned Man
- Nationality: American

Joshua Graham, formerly known as the Malpais Legate and later the Burned Man, is a fictional character in the post-apocalypse video game franchise Fallout. Graham is first mentioned in Fallout: New Vegas as a mythological background character, before being introduced as a central character in its 2011 downloadable content pack Honest Hearts. He also would have appeared in Van Buren, the original Fallout 3 developed by Black Isle Studios under Interplay Entertainment, but the game was cancelled in 2003.

== Conception and development ==
Concept art for Graham was done by Pilot Studio, who also developed the cover for Honest Hearts. Due to the gruesomeness of the character's injuries, they stated "the research and mood boards were not that fun to do".

Joshua Graham was written by Chris Avellone for Black Isle Studios' intended third Fallout game, at the time codenamed Van Buren. Called the "Hanged Man", he would have been one of a number of recruitable companions and the strongest of them all in terms of combat and gameplay statistics but would've made it extremely difficult to negotiate and communicate with other non-player characters due to his status as a notorious criminal, inspired by DC Comics character the Unknown Soldier. He was intended to be an evil character in regards to acts he committed before the events of the game. In retrospective, New Vegas game director Josh Sawyer saw him as a man without purpose and without a character arc save for a few key moments. He further commented in retrospect that while his attempts to laugh off others controlling him coupled with the characterization provided by others in-game could have provided interesting storytelling, he felt it instead ended at "nasty guy who says and does creepy stuff and is a badass".

When development began on Fallout: New Vegas for Obsidian Entertainment, many ideas were carried over from the original Van Buren concept, among them Graham. Sawyer chose to rewrite the character concept for Graham because he felt the "wow so crazy" character archetype were not particularly interesting or insightful as they existed more in the realm of fantasy. Instead, he wanted characters that influenced the player's perception to feel more human, feeling that if the player could not put themselves in the shoes of that character it would be harder to empathize with them. Graham's characterization drew from various elements, such as Paul the Apostle, Robert de Niro's character in the film The Mission, and Lawrence of Arabia. When asked how a character like Graham could still claim to be Christian after all he had done and experienced, Sawyer responded by citing the Parable of the Prodigal Son.

=== Story development ===
Regarding his characterization in the story, Sawyer had wanted to illustrate a religious conflict for some time that was not pro-religion versus anti-religion. While early versions would have had Graham in direct conflict with another character, Daniel, with Joshua behaving more aggressively, he felt this would have made for poor storytelling. Instead he chose to approach it as the pair against an external threat, and the player being given two bad decisions. Initially too he had wanted the player's meeting with Graham to feel reductive, as during the course of the game they would hear his legend, only to be disappointed as they would find him inspecting his guns, the equivalent of finding him "putting on his pants one leg at a time".

Some of the development team objected however, wanting to have Graham be a demonic image in his introduction, but Sawyer wanted him to be "a man first and the monster later". To satisfy that reaction he added graffiti on the path to meeting Joshua portraying him as a large figure crushing a tribe, comparing it to Goya's Saturn Devouring His Son, a figure "dwarfing and destroying everyone around him". Graham's role as a legend also caused some problems when writing Daniel, who was portrayed instead as a normal man in the situation. Further complications arose from both characters being Mormons, as it was not normally a pacifist religion. While Sawyer felt players would naturally side with Graham due to the nature of Fallout being "violence first", he was surprised by the emotional connections players made during the Honest Hearts story in their decisions to side with him.

=== Design and voice ===
Graham is a heavily burned man covered from head to toe in bandages with the exception of his eyes across the bridge of his nose. He wears a SWAT bulletproof vest with markings from the Salt Lake City Police Department, with a white shirt underneath with rolled up sleeves and a black band around the right arm. His legs are covered by worn jeans with the left knee missing, while he wears a snakeskin belt and matching boots on his feet. Graham is armed with a Colt M1911 pistol with a snakeskin grip named "A Light Shining in Darkness", with the model of the gun serving as a tie to his Mormon heritage.

Graham's low-collar white shirt, sleeve garter, and the cut of the ballistic vest were meant to give his character an "old west"/preacher aesthetic according to Sawyer, along with the use of snakeskin on his attire and gun. Stitched patterns in his shirt were meant to reflect his relationship with the Dead Horses tribe, but also reflect a scene from The Mission. Additional inspiration came from singer P.J. Harvey's White Chalk tour, where she had lyrics stitched in black thread on her white dress. For his character animations, Sawyer brought in his own unloaded Colt M1911 pistol to show animator Seth McCaughey how to properly reload and inspect the weapon, which he incorporated into the game.

Keith Szarabajka voiced the character, and was almost passed over for the role. Sawyer had wanted to sit in on the casting decisions for characters he wrote but was unable to for the first day of submissions for Graham. When the developer who had taken his place provided them, he had suggested passing on Szarabajka, who had a cold and the audio was recorded on a windy day. While Sawyer felt the recording was rough, he still decided to cast him in the role as he "could tell immediately that he was going to knock Joshua Graham out of the park".

== Appearances ==
Joshua Graham was introduced in the 2010 action role-playing game Fallout: New Vegas. He is a Mormon missionary and tribal war chief who leads the Dead Horses tribe at Dead Horse Point in Zion Canyon in post-apocalyptic Utah, one of the territories of the former American Southwest. He is accompanied by Daniel, another Mormon who leads the Sorrows tribe in The Narrows. Graham and Daniel are both survivors of the slaughter of New Canaan by Salt-Upon-Wounds, the war chief of the White Legs tribe. The survivors of the attack have spread across the wasteland.

== Promotion and reception ==
To promote Honest Hearts and the character for New Vegas, a cover image was produced for the downloadable content focusing on Graham's face. Meanwhile, a miniature figure of Graham called "Burned Man" was produced as an unaligned unit for Modiphius' Wasteland Warfare tabletop game.

Author Allison Stalberg writing for Game Rant stated that fans were not drawn to Graham because he was a good person, but instead how he survived, and how he fills the role of an anti-hero through his past with Caesar and instead of being redeemed serves as a reformed villain. She further attributed his popularity to how while he talked about religion he never came across as preachy, instead "serious, blunt, honest, and honorable at times", an aspect furthered by Szarabajka's voice work. Stalberg noted that since New Vegas, "few new badass characters have compared to Joshua Graham", stating that while some had become fan favorites they had not achieved the same mass appeal as Graham had.

Michael Swaim of IGN stated that hearing about Graham during the course of New Vegas built up the character's mystique, to the point seeing him in person had significant weight. T. J. Denzer of Shacknews shared these statements, adding that the point when you actually meet him in game was "a reverent experience". Describing him as someone neither of the game's two largest factions could kill whose bravado "puts that on full display in your meeting". Describing him as both religious and practical, Denzer felt he was a ghost story made real, and coming to know and engage with him acted as one of the biggest payoffs in the Fallout franchise.

Skip Cameron in an article for Kotaku cited Graham as an example of Obsidian's handling of Mormonism he appreciated. He felt Graham's early role in the Legion and how it shifted to a more violent one did not represent any attack on Mormonism but his own personal failings. Furthermore, Cameron felt his later return to New Canaan bucked a tradition of painting religion as harsh and unforgiving, as they were shown instead "embracing him as a returning prodigal". While he acknowledged this touched upon the theme of repentance and forgiveness in religion, it also touched upon actual Mormon history, which at times was shown to have traitors of the faith return and beg for forgiveness. Regardless of the source he ultimately appreciated this theme was featured so prominent in Honest Hearts and the story of "saint-turned-sinner-turned-saint" Joshua Graham.

University of Nevada professor David G. Schwartz examined Joshua and Daniel's roles in the story of Honest Hearts in the scope of American Western history. He drew similarities to the 1857 Mountain Meadows Massacre, a real-life war involving the Mormons in Utah. Daniel's method ultimately paints civilization in the West as a "process", pointing out that in abandoning Zion the tribe continues to migrate away from invaders over and over. Meanwhile, if the player sides with Graham, they in turn illustrate that Zion is a special place that cannot merely be duplicated. This acts in contrast to Daniel but also in real-world Native American history, which Schwartz felt may further sway players to side with Graham. Schwartz further noted that the story itself offered no truly happy endings, as even in Graham's "best" ending he continues to fight fiercely against his enemies, his demons not extinguished but at least appeased.

Graham has also been the source of many Christian converts, particularly the "mostly young men" in New Vegas' demographic according to Rev. Samuel Cripps of The Living Church, who also praised the character as a "compelling Christian character" who "imperfectly illustrate[s] the human spirit enlivened with the Holy Spirit" and compared his in-game journey to Ignatius of Antioch.
