= New California =

New California may refer to:

- Alta California, a 19th-century Spanish and later Mexican territory officially known as Nueva California between 1804 and 1824
- A 21st-century proposal for partition and secession in California
- New California, Ohio, a census-designated place
- Garden City, Texas, formerly known as New California
- New California Republic, a fictional federal republic and faction featured in the Fallout series
- Fallout: New California, a Fallout fan game
