= Keith Szarabajka =

American actor

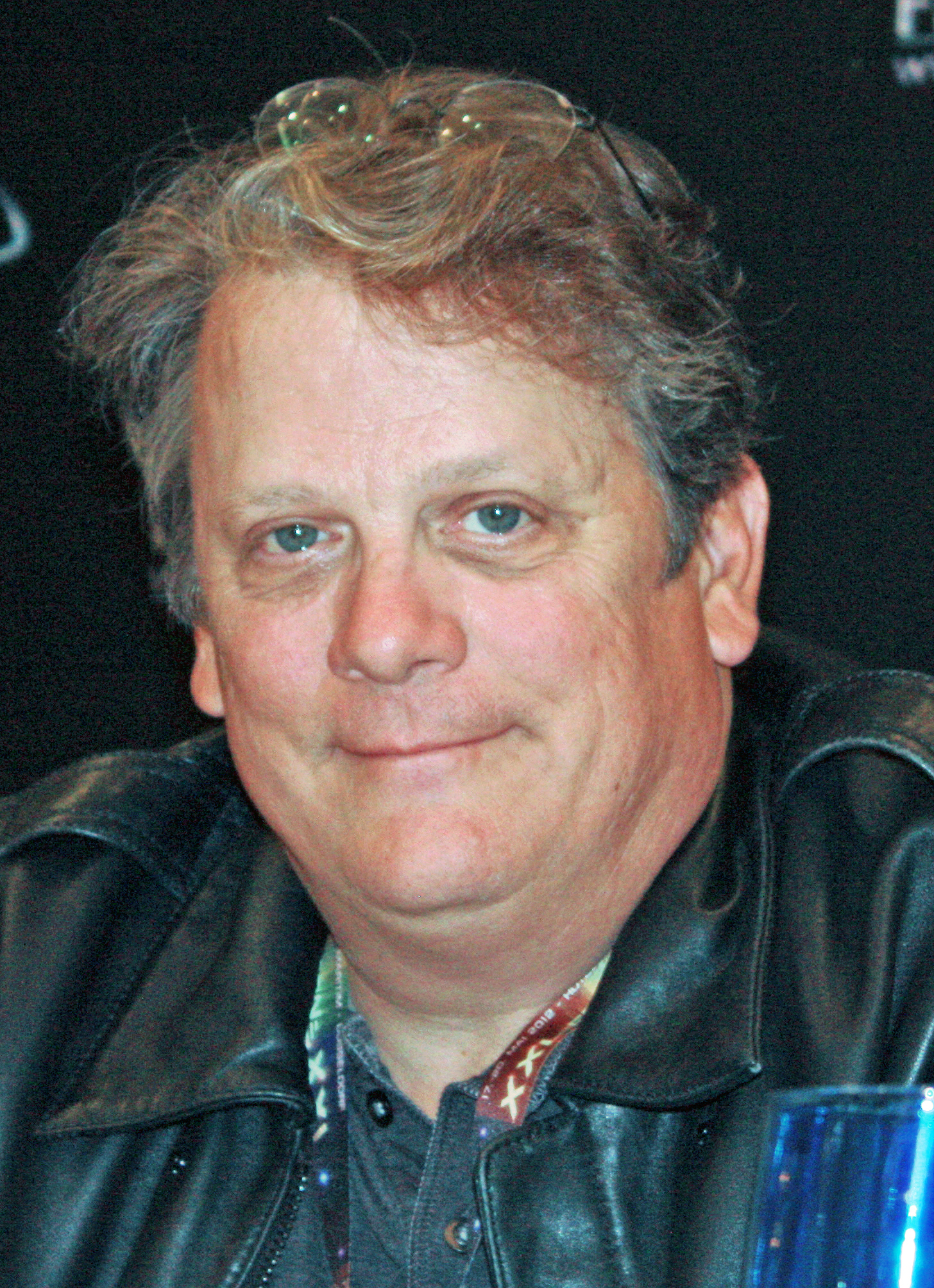
- Szarabajka at FedCon XXI in May 2012
- Born: December 2, 1952 (age 73); Oak Park, Illinois, U.S.
- Education: John Hersey High School
- Alma mater: University of Chicago; Trinity University
- Occupation: Actor
- Years active: 1979–present
- Spouse: Jennifer Jay Stewart (m. 1994; div. 2005)
- Children: 2

Keith Szarabajka (/særəˈbaɪkə/; Polish: [ʂaraˈbajka]; born December 2, 1952) is an American actor. He is best known for his roles as Mickey Kostmayer on The Equalizer, Daniel Holtz on Angel, Gerard Stephens in The Dark Knight and Adam Engell in Argo. He has also voiced Dr. Terrence Kyne in Dead Space, Major General Spencer Mahad in Dead Space 3, Joshua Graham in Fallout: New Vegas, Harbinger in Mass Effect 2, Detective Herschel Biggs in L.A. Noire and the Didact in Halo 4.

== Early life ==
Szarabajka was born in Oak Park, Illinois on December 2, 1952, the son of Anne, a school teacher, and Edward Szarabajka, a savings and loan officer. His father was a much decorated veteran of World War II, who fought in North Africa and Italy until the end of the war, and received the Silver Star, two Bronze Stars and the Purple Heart.

He attended Campion Jesuit High School in Prairie du Chien, Wisconsin, John Hersey High School in Arlington Heights, Illinois, and the University of Chicago, as well as Trinity University in San Antonio, Texas. He studied acting further at the Organic Theater in Chicago from 1972 to 1978. During this time, he co-wrote "Bleacher Bums" along with, among others, Joe Mantegna and Stuart Gordon. In 1982 he had a supporting role in the Costa-Gavras film Missing.

== Career ==
His acting resume is extensive, appearing in numerous television programs including The Equalizer, Profit, The X-Files, Becker, Star Trek: Voyager, Star Trek: Enterprise, Charmed, Roswell, 24, Max Steel, The Inside, and Law & Order. In 1994, he portrayed Matthew Stoner in Babylon 5 episode "Soul Mates". He is known for his role as Mickey Kostmayer in the 1980s show The Equalizer, as well as for his recurring role as vampire hunter Daniel Holtz in the cult series Angel, the spin-off from Buffy the Vampire Slayer. He played the lead role in Stephen King's Golden Years. In 2016, he began the recurring guest role of Donatello Redfield in Supernatural, appearing in nine episodes before the show's conclusion in 2020.

Szarabajka has contributed his voice to several audio books, notably Fierce Invalids Home from Hot Climates by Tom Robbins, for which he won the 2001 Audie Award for Best Fiction, Unabridged; Fear Nothing and Seize the Night by Dean Koontz; several roles in a Grammy nominated audio dramatization of The Maltese Falcon, Rising Sun by Michael Crichton; Nelson Algren's Walk on the Wild Side; and The Mark of Zorro opposite Val Kilmer. Szarabajka is the voice of Russman in Call of Duty: Black Ops 2.

Additionally, he provided the voice for antagonist Dmitri Yuriev in the Xenosaga series and for The Master of Whispers in the game Guild Wars: Nightfall and for Emile Dufraisne in Tom Clancy's Splinter Cell: Double Agent. He played the role of Detective Gerard Stephens in the Batman Begins sequel The Dark Knight and voiced Dr. Terrence Kyne for the animated sci-fi horror film Dead Space: Downfall based on the Dead Space video game. He also voiced a minor character in Condemned 2: Bloodshot named Inferi.

He is the Archangel Azrael in Darksiders: Wrath of War and is the Crowfather, The Scribe, and Wicked Killington in Darksiders 2. He also is Wicked Killington in Darksiders: Genesis. He played a very small role in Dragon Age: Origins as a nameless dwarf collecting nugs, a voiceset for male dwarf characters, and several minor characters. He plays Executor Pallin in the video game Mass Effect and the Reaper Harbinger, the main villain of its sequel Mass Effect 2 as well as a few minor characters. In 2008, he voiced Venom in Spider-Man: Web of Shadows. In 2010, he voiced the Autobot Ironhide in Transformers: War for Cybertron as well as its 2012 sequel Transformers: Fall of Cybertron, and Mr. Freeze in Young Justice. He provides the voice for Gilgamesh in the Final Fantasy franchise starting with Dissidia 012. He also provided the voice for Joshua Graham in Honest Hearts, downloadable content for Fallout: New Vegas.

Szarabajka's later roles include the narrator Detective Herschel Biggs in the video game LA Noire, the Chaos Advisor and Captain Apollo Diomedes in Relic Entertainment's Dawn of War II: Chaos Rising, Warhammer 40,000: Dawn of War II – Retribution, Laserbeak in Transformers: Dark of the Moon, Bastion in X-Men Destiny, several voices in The Elder Scrolls V: Skyrim, Ronan the Accuser in The Avengers: Earth's Mightiest Heroes, the Living Laser in Ultimate Spider-Man, Azrael The Narrator in Darksiders, the Crowfather in Darksiders II, the Witch-king of Angmar in Guardians of Middle-earth, Russman in Call of Duty: Black Ops II, the Ur-Didact in Halo 4, General Spencer Mahad in Dead Space 3, and Cornelius Slate in BioShock Infinite.

He is also voiced Flameslinger in the Skylanders reboot of the franchise.

On Broadway, he originated the role of B.D. in Doonesbury.

== Filmography ==
=== Film ===
List of film performances
Year	Title	Role	Notes	Source
1980	Simon	Josh		
1982	Missing	David Holloway		
1984	Protocol	Crowe		
1985	Warning Sign	Tippett		
1985	Marie	Kevin McCormack		
1986	Billy Galvin	Donny		
1987	Walker	Timothy Crocker		
1989	Staying Together	Kevin Burley		
1992	Under Cover of Darkness	Clayton Dooley		
1993	A Perfect World	Terry James Pugh		
1994	Andre	Billy Baker		
1998	Dancer, Texas Pop. 81	Squirrel's Father		
2002	We Were Soldiers	Diplomatic Spook		
2002	The Wild Thornberrys Movie	Poacher	Voice	
2008	The Dark Knight	Gerard Stephens		
2008	Dead Space: Downfall	Dr. Terrence Kyne	Voice, direct-to-video	
2011	Transformers: Dark of the Moon	Laserbeak	Voice	
2012	The Dark Knight Rises	Gerard Stephens	Uncredited	
2012	Argo	Adam Engell		
2013	The Insomniac	Ted Lemont		
2015	Batman Unlimited: Animal Instincts	Silverback	Voice, direct-to-video	
2018	City of Lies	Desk Sgt. Reese		
2019	DC Showcase: Death	Supervisor	Voice, short film	
2020	Batman: Death in the Family	Supervisor	Voice, direct-to-video	
2021	Encounter	Grant		

=== Television ===
List of television performances
Year	Title	Role	Notes	Source
1984	Miami Vice	Joey Bramlette	Episode: "Glades"	
1985–89	The Equalizer	Mickey Kostmayer	56 episodes	
1986	Adam's Apple	Garth Russell	Television film	
1986	ABC Afterschool Special	Peter Desmond	Episode: "Wanted: The Perfect Guy"	
1987	The Misfit Brigade	Sergeant Wilhelm "Old Man" Beier	Television film	
1991	Golden Years	Harlan Williams	7 episodes	
1992–97	Law & Order	Harry Sibelius, Neil Gorton	4 episodes	
1993	The Young Indiana Jones Chronicles	Colonel Waters	Episode: "Transylvania, January 1918"	
1994	3×3 Eyes	Professor Fujii, Ryouko	Voice, English dub	
1994	North and South	Captain Venable	2 episodes	
1994	Duckman	Additional voices	Episode: "Gripes of Wrath"	
1994	Under Suspicion	Wayne McCabe	2 episodes	
1994	Babylon 5	Matthew Stoner	Episode: "Soul Mates"	
1995–97	Aaahh!!! Real Monsters	Corpus, Skritch, Dean	Voice, 3 episodes	
1996	Kung Fu: The Legend Continues	Christianson	Episode: "Circle of Light"	
1996	The Burning Zone	Gordon Kinnock	Episode: "Lethal Injection"	
1996	Walker, Texas Ranger	Hendricks	Episode: "Redemption"	
1996	Early Edition	Paul	Episode: "After Midnight"	
1996–97	Profit	Charles Henry "Chaz" Gracen	8 episodes	
1997	Extreme Ghostbusters	Lead Crainiac	Voice, episode: "Deadliners"	
1997–98	Spy Game	Piotr "Shank" Reshankov, The President	5 episodes	
1998	Timecop	Cromwell	Episode: "The Future, Jack, the Future"	
1998	The Angry Beavers	Spootimus, Maximus	Voice, episode: "Friends, Romans, Beavers!"	
1998	Vengeance Unlimited	Dr. Alan Walker	Episode: "Victim of Circumstance"	
1998–99	The Wild Thornberrys	Kip O'Donnell	Voice	
1999	Honey, I Shrunk the Kids: The TV Show	Powell Weltmeister	Episode: "Honey, I'm King of the Rocket Guys"	
1999	Diagnosis: Murder	Flynn	Episode: "Never Say Die"	
1999	Godzilla: The Series	Philippe Roaché	Voice, episode: "An Early Frost"	
1999	Thanks	Reverend Goodacre	5 episodes	
2000	Men in Black: The Series	Additional voices	Voice, episode: "The Lights Out Syndrome"	
2000	Roughnecks: Starship Troopers Chronicles	Lt. Rockford	Voice, episode: "D-Day"	
2000	Pacific Blue	Malcolm Cross	Episode: "A Thousand Words"	
2000	Becker	Wayne	Episode: "The Roast That Ruined Them"	
2000	Party of Five	Oliver	Episode: "Blast from the Past"	
2000	Touched by an Angel	Barkley Stubbs	Episode: "The Face on the Bar Room Floor"	
2000	Star Trek: Voyager	Teero Anaydis	Episode: "Repression"	
2000	The X-Files	Anthony Tipet	Episode: "Via Negativa"	
2000–02	Max Steel	Psycho, Jean Mairot, Luke DeMarco	Voice, 10 episodes	
2001	Roswell	Dan Lubetkin	2 episodes	
2001	Kate Brasher	Bryce Taylor	Episode: "Simon"	
2001	The Division	Brett Harper	Episode: "Absolution"	
2001	The Zeta Project	Rodin Krick	Voice, episode: "Taffy Time"	
2001	Batman Beyond	Bracelet Kobra	Voice, episode: "Unmasked"	
2001–02	Angel	Daniel Holtz	11 episodes	
2002	Star Trek: Enterprise	Damrus	Episode: "Rogue Planet"	
2002	She Spies	Liev Schreiber	Episode: "Fondles"	
2002	ER	Mr. DeLuca	Episode: "One Can Only Hope"	
2002	Crossing Jordan	Peter Nash	Episode: "Don't Look Back"	
2003	The Mummy	Fodden King	Voice, episode: "The Cold"	
2003	Spider-Man: The New Animated Series	Kingpin's Henchman	Voice, episode: "Royal Scam"	
2003	Teen Titans	Trigon	Voice, episode: "Nevermore"	
2003	Charmed	Zahn	Episode: "Soul Survivor"	
2004	Megas XLR	Ator	Voice, episode: "Ice Ice Megas"	
2005	Unscripted	Limo Driver	1 episode	
2005	Numbers	Cricket / Frank Milton	Episode: "Sabotage"	
2005	Avatar: The Last Airbender	Additional voices	Voice, episode: "Imprisoned"	
2005	24	Robert Morrison	2 episodes	
2005	Into the West	Gov. L. Stanford	Episode: "Hell on Wheels"	
2005	A.T.O.M.	Dragon	Voice, episode: "Enter the Dragon"	
2006	The Inside	Arlen Dallas	Episode: "Gem"	
2008	Eleventh Hour	Agent Whittier	Episode: "Savant"	
2008	Prison Break	David Baker	Episode: "The Legend"	
2008–10	Cold Case	Patrick Hogan, Patrick Doherty	5 episodes	
2009	CSI: Crime Scene Investigation	Randy	Episode: "Disarmed and Dangerous"	
2009	Archer	Crenshaw	Voice, episode: "Mole Hunt"	
2010	Terriers	DEA Agent Samuel Weisdorf	Episode: "Agua Caliente"	
2010–11	Sons of Anarchy	Viktor Putlova	3 episodes	
2010–11	Young Justice	Mr. Freeze	Voice, 2 episodes	
2011	G.I. Joe: Renegades	Warden, Con #1, P.A. Voice	Voice, 2 episodes	
2012	Generator Rex	Additional voices	Voice, episode: "Deadzone"	
2012	Ultimate Spider-Man	Living Laser	Voice, episode: "Flight of the Iron Spider"	
2012	The Avengers: Earth's Mightiest Heroes	Ronan the Accuser	Voice, episode: "Welcome to the Kree Empire"	
2012	Elementary	Wade Crewes	Episode: "One Way to Get Off"	
2013	Criminal Minds	Detective Hardy Friedman	Episode: "All That Remains"	
2014	Castle	James Grady	Episode: "Once Upon a Time in the West"	
2014–18	Star Wars Rebels	Cikatro Vizago	Voice, 8 episodes	
2016	Pretty Little Liars	Dr. E. Cochran	Episode: "Exes and OMGs"	
2016–19	Supernatural	Donatello Redfield	9 episodes	
2018	Summer Camp Island	Additional voices	Voice, episode: "Monster Babies"	
2020	9-1-1	Rory	Episode: "What's Next?"	
2022	Close Enough	Sam "The Sandman" Fenders	Voice, episode: "Where the Buffalo Roam/Venice Vengeance"	

=== Video games ===
List of video game performances
Year	Title	Role	Notes	Source
1996	Soviet Strike	President Yeltsin		
1998	Grim Fandango	Bowlsley, Uncicycle Man		
2000	Star Wars: Force Commander	Dewback Trooper, Infiltrator, TIE Fighter Pilot		
2000	Escape from Monkey Island	Reverend Rasputin		
2000	The Wild Thornberrys: Rambler	Kip O'Donnell		
2001	Command & Conquer: Yuri's Revenge	Additional voices		
2001	Max Steel: Covert Missions	Psycho		
2002	Pirates: The Legend of Black Kat	Hawke		
2002	Soldier of Fortune II: Double Helix	Sgt. Peterson		
2002	Earth and Beyond	Professor Nostradamaus Smythe		
2003	Enter the Matrix	Additional voices		
2003	Gladius	Additional voices		
2003	Crimson Skies: High Road to Revenge	Kahn, Die Spinne		
2003	James Bond 007: Everything or Nothing	Arkady Yayakov		
2004	Tales of Symphonia	Efreet		
2004	Spider-Man 2	Mr. Aziz		
2004	The Bard's Tale	Additional voices		
2004	EverQuest II	Additional voices	Also Desert of Flames	
2004	Viewtiful Joe 2	Jet Black		
2005	Xenosaga Episode II	Boss, Vanderkam		
2005	Madagascar	Reggie the Rhino, Big Louie, Cop		
2005	Tom Clancy's Rainbow Six: Lockdown	Additional voices		
2005	Ultimate Spider-Man	Wolverine		
2005	Viewtiful Joe: Red Hot Rumble	Jet Black		
2005	Darkwatch	Lazarus		
2006	Splinter Cell: Essentials	Emile Dufraisne		
2006	Xenosaga Episode III	Dmitri Yuriev, Helmer		
2006	Saints Row	Stilwater's Resident		
2006	Company of Heroes	Additional voices		
2006	Tom Clancy's Splinter Cell: Double Agent	Emile Dufraisne		
2006	Guild Wars Nightfall	Master of Whispers, additional voices		
2006	The Sopranos: Road to Respect	Dr. Adams, additional voices		
2006	Gothic 3	Xardas		
2007	Titan Quest: Immortal Throne	Additional voices		
2007	Command & Conquer 3: Tiberium Wars	Additional voices		
2007	Transformers: The Game	Decepticons, additional voices		
2007	Transformers: Decepticons	Drones, additional voices		
2007	Transformers: Autobots	Drones, additional voices		
2007	Supreme Commander: Forged Alliance	General Hall		
2007	Mass Effect	Executor Pallin, Lilihierax		
2007	Universe at War: Earth Assault	Kamal Rex, Military Marine, Novus Reflez Trooper		
2008	Condemned 2: Bloodshot	Patron, Inferi, Speedballer		
2008	Command & Conquer 3: Kane's Wrath	Additional voices		
2008	Ratchet & Clank Future: Quest for Booty	Mayor Barnabus Worley		
2008	Dead Space	Dr. Terrence Kyne		
2008	Saints Row 2	Additional voices		
2008	Spider-Man: Web of Shadows	Venom		
2009	Red Faction Guerrilla	Additional voices		
2009	Dragon Age: Origins	Various		
2009	Warhammer 40,000: Dawn of War II	Wraithlords		
2010	Darksiders	Azrael		
2010	Mass Effect 2	Harbinger	Also Arrival DLC	
2010	BioShock 2	Reed Wahl	Also Minerva's Den DLC	
2010	Fallout New Vegas	Joshua Graham		
2010	Supreme Commander 2	Additional voices		
2010	Warhammer 40,000: Dawn of War II – Chaos Rising	Diomedes, Wraithguard, Chaos		
2010	Transformers: War for Cybertron	Ironhide		
2010	Spider-Man: Shattered Dimensions	Additional voices		
2010	Quantum Theory	Franz, Xex		
2010	Call of Duty: Black Ops	Additional voices		
2011	Dead Space 2	Additional voices		
2011	Dissidia 012 Final Fantasy	Gilgamesh		
2011	Warhammer 40,000: Dawn of War II – Retribution	Chaos Voice of God, Diomedes, Wraithguard, Wraithlord		
2011	Dragon Age II	Bartrand Tethras, Maraas		
2011	L.A. Noire	Narrator, Herschel Biggs		
2011	Fallout: New Vegas	Joshua Graham	Honest Hearts DLC	
2011	X-Men: Destiny	Bastion, additional voices		
2011	Spider-Man: Edge of Time	Additional voices		
2011	The Lord of the Rings: War in the North	Urgost		
2011	The Elder Scrolls V: Skyrim	Dunmer (Male)	Also Dragonborn DLC	
2011	Star Wars: The Old Republic		Also Knights of the Fallen Empire DLC	
2011–15	Skylanders series	Flameslinger		
2012	Kingdoms of Amalur: Reckoning	Adessa Citizen, Rathir Citizen, Scholar, Soldier, Sparrow		
2012	Asura's Wrath	Kalrow		
2012	Mass Effect 3	C-Sec Assistant, Turian Soldier, Dock Officer		
2012	The Amazing Spider-Man	Oscorp Security		
2012	Darksiders II	The Crowfather, The Scribe, Wicked K, Nephilim Whispers		
2012	Transformers: Fall of Cybertron	Ironhide		
2012	Guild Wars 2	Additional voices		
2012	Halo 4	The Didact		
2012	Lego The Lord of the Rings	Additional voices		
2012	Call of Duty: Black Ops II	Russman, Survivor #4		
2013	Dead Space 3	General Spencer Mahad, additional voices		
2013	BioShock Infinite	Cornelius Slate		
2013	Teenage Mutant Ninja Turtles: Out of the Shadows	Kraang		
2013	Hearthstone	Oculeth		
2014	The Elder Scrolls Online	Various		
2014	WildStar	Colonel Audax, Maelstrom, Noximind		
2014	Transformers: Rise of the Dark Spark	Ironhide, Autobot Titan		
2014	Tales from the Borderlands	Rudiger		
2015	Final Fantasy Type-0 HD	Gilgamesh		
2015	Batman: Arkham Knight	Firefighter Daniell, Firefighter Scott, The Order		
2015	Metal Gear Solid V: The Phantom Pain	Soldiers		
2015	Fallout 4	John-Caleb Bradberton, Male Ghouls, Vault-Tec Scientist	Also Nuka-World DLC	
2016	World of Warcraft: Legion	Chief Telemancer Oculeth		
2016	Mafia III	Additional voices		
2016	World of Final Fantasy	Gilgamesh		
2016	Dishonored 2	Middle Class Citizen	Also Death of the Outsider DLC	
2017	Batman: The Enemy Within	Harvey Bullock, additional voices		
2018	Call of Duty: Black Ops 4	Russman		
2018	Fallout 76	Dr. Edgar Blackburn	Steel Dawn DLC	
2018	Marvel Powers United VR	Venom		
2019	Rage 2	Rusty Junior, Wellspring Guards		
2019	Darksiders Genesis	Wicked Killington		
2021	Halo Infinite	Tovarus		
2022	Chocobo GP	Gilgamesh		
2022	Stranger of Paradise: Final Fantasy Origin	Gilgamesh		
2024	Final Fantasy VII Rebirth	Gilgamesh		
2025	The Elder Scrolls IV: Oblivion Remastered	Dunmer (Male)		
