= Pentiment =

Pentiment may refer to:

- Pentiment (video game), a 2022 release
- Pentimento, an alteration in a painting.
