= Fallout: New Vegas downloadable content =

Downloadable content for 2010 video game

- Developer: Obsidian Entertainment
- Publisher: Bethesda Softworks
- Series: Fallout
- Engine: Gamebryo
- Platforms: Microsoft Windows, PlayStation 3, Xbox 360
- Release: Dead Money; December 21, 2010 (XBL); February 22, 2011 (PSN/Steam); Honest Hearts; May 17, 2011 (XBL); May 18, 2011 (Steam); June 2, 2011 (PSN); Old World Blues; July 19, 2011 (XBL/PSN/Steam); Lonesome Road; September 20, 2011 (XBL/PSN/Steam); Courier's Stash; September 27, 2011 (XBL/PSN/Steam); Gun Runners' Arsenal; September 27, 2011 (XBL/PSN/Steam)

Six downloadable content (DLC) packs have been released for the 2010 action role-playing video game Fallout: New Vegas, developed by Obsidian Entertainment and published by Bethesda Softworks. Of these, four include map expansions and new storylines. These plots coincide and are ultimately brought together in the final major DLC of the four, Lonesome Road.

Development was spearheaded by Chris Avellone, who sought to expand the story and gameplay in ways that may not have been received well in the base game, such as survival horror, among others.

== Dead Money ==
Dead Money is the first Fallout: New Vegas downloadable content pack and takes place at the Sierra Madre, an isolated location near the Grand Canyon, consisting of a compact planned town built next to a large casino. The story is a heist-style plot revolving around breaking into the casino's well defended vault, with an overarching theme of letting go and beginning again. The pack adds a new map, along with several new weapons and non-playable characters. Additionally, multiple unique in-game hazards force the player to take a slower and methodical approach: a cloud of poisonous toxin present throughout many areas slowly drains health points; wall-mounted speakers emit radio frequencies that can trigger an explosive collar around the player's neck if they linger by one for too long, instantly killing them; and invincible holographic enemies patrol interior locations on set paths, requiring the player to avoid them by timing movements or changing the patrol patterns via terminals.

The expansion was released on December 21, 2010 for Xbox Live, and February 22, 2011 for the PlayStation Network and Steam.

=== Plot ===
In the mid-late 2070s, with threats of nuclear war rising, businessman Fredrick Sinclair vowed to create a self-sufficient, impenetrable safe haven for actress Vera Keyes, for whom he harbored deep feelings. As such, he built the Sierra Madre Casino & Resort. The scientific research company Big MT was contracted to supply experimental technology for the project, including holographic security guards, heavy-duty hazmat suits, and matter replicators. Secretly, they also decided to use the site as a testing ground for an airborne toxin. To Sinclair's dismay, he learned that Keyes was involved in a plot (albeit unwillingly) organized by lounge singer Dean Domino to rob the casino vault. Angered, he had the vault built to trap an intruder inside, but felt remorse after Keyes confessed to him. He attempted to personally disarm the trap, but succumbed to the lethal toxin in the air systems before he could.

Shortly after, global nuclear war between the United States and China erupted. Guests present for the casino's intended grand opening were mistaken by the holographic security for intruders and slaughtered, while Keyes chose to commit suicide by overdosing. The only survivors were Domino and several construction workers wearing the hazmat suits. The latter were unable to free themselves as a result of the suits' overengineered design and mutated due to the toxin, becoming known as the "ghost people". Over the next two centuries, the toxin cloud expanded to envelop nearly the entire complex; its lethal nature deterred most explorers and left the site largely untouched. Domino, now ghoulified, remained behind, still desiring to break into the vault.

A little more than 200 years later, Father Elijah — a rogue Brotherhood of Steel elder — arrived at the Sierra Madre, looking to use its experimental technology to wage a one-man war against the New California Republic (NCR), but found that he also needed to unlock the vault to achieve his goals. Using a nightkin (a variant of super mutant) with multiple personalities named Dog and God, he would abduct unsuspecting wanderers, attach explosive collars around their necks to ensure compliance, and force them to try to break into the casino. By 2281, all attempts so far have proven unsuccessful. His latest captives are Domino and a woman named Christine Royce — an operative sent by the Brotherhood to eliminate Elijah.

The Courier is drawn to an abandoned Brotherhood bunker by a mysterious radio broadcast, only to be rendered unconscious and brought to the Sierra Madre. There, they wake up collared and stripped of all possessions. The player is instructed by Father Elijah to form a makeshift team with Domino, Royce, and Dog/God in order to trigger the casino's original programmed grand opening event, which unseals the main doors. All the while, they must contend with the ghost people, toxin cloud, and security holograms. Once inside, the player restores the building's power, after which they confront each member of the team and decide their fate. The Courier then enters the casino's lower levels, reaching the vault and luring Elijah down to it via the intercom system. There, they can choose to kill him or trap him inside.

Alternatively, in two non-canonical endings, the player can ally themselves with Elijah or become trapped in the vault themselves.

=== Reception ===
Dead Money received mixed reviews from critics, on Metacritic scoring 70 for both PC and Xbox 360, and 68 for PS3. Kristine Steimer of IGN praised the slower-paced gameplay and the fact the player is required to meticulously search for supplies while avoiding enemies, but acknowledged the existence of several major bugs that negatively affected the user experience. She also criticized a sudden jump in difficulty, stating, "there’s also a random difficulty spike halfway through that can be really frustrating. The game switches from a stealth focus to combat-heavy, but with such limited ammo and supplies, fighting off waves and waves of overly aggro ghosts isn't much fun."

== Honest Hearts ==
Honest Hearts is the second downloadable content pack for Fallout: New Vegas. It is set within Zion National Park in Utah and features four factions: the Dead Horses, the Sorrows, the White Legs, and the New Canaanites. The first two tribes peacefully inhabit Zion together, while the White Legs are hostile invaders who know only how to survive off of raiding. The New Canaanites are Mormon missionaries who lend their assistance to the Sorrows and Dead Horses. The story explores several religious themes and encourages the player to choose between two sides trying their best to do what they believe is right. The pack includes a new map to explore, along with new weapons, non-playable characters, and wearable outfits.

The expansion was released on May 17 and May 18 of 2011 for Xbox Live and Steam; however, the PlayStation Network release did not come until June 2 of that year due to the 2011 PlayStation Network outage

=== Plot ===
In the mid-23rd century, Joshua Graham, a Mormon missionary from the post-war settlement New Canaan, located near the ruins of Salt Lake City, met a man named Edward Sallow. The two encountered the post-war Blackfoot tribe, taught them the concept of total warfare, and molded them into a formidable fighting force. They went on to form the totalitarian dictatorship Caesar's Legion, modeled after the Roman Empire, with Sallow as "Caesar", its leader, and Graham as the "Malpais Legate", Caesar's second-in-command. The Legion swept across the former American Southwest, conquering dozens of tribes and assimilating them. In 2277, however, the Legion battled the NCR for control of Hoover Dam and lost. As punishment, Graham was stripped of his position, set on fire, and thrown into the Grand Canyon.

A remorseful Graham would ultimately survive and return to New Canaan. Sightings of the "Burned Man" reached Caesar, who recruited the White Legs — a tribe aspiring to voluntarily join the Legion — into destroying the Mormon settlement. The survivors, including Graham, migrated south to Zion National Park where they met the region's tribes: the Dead Horses and the Sorrows, who they vowed to protect from the still pursuing White Legs. Graham assumed the position of the Dead Horses' war chief, while fellow missionary Daniel assisted the Sorrows. The two Mormons hold differing viewpoints, with the former wanting to stay in Zion and militarily defend against the White Legs, while the latter wants to evacuate both tribes to the Grand Staircase in order to preserve their peaceful nature.

In 2281, the Courier accompanies a caravan from the Mojave Wasteland through Zion and comes under attack by the White Legs, of which they are the only survivor. Lacking the knowledge of how to get back, they venture into the national park, meeting Graham and Daniel, who both ask the Courier to gather supplies for their respective plans. The player must decide to either fight the White Legs alongside Graham, or assist Daniel in fleeing Zion. At any point throughout the story, the player can choose to turn on both the Sorrows and the Dead Horses, recover a map of the region, and leave early.

Additional exploration of the map allows the player to learn the story of Randall Clark, an ex-soldier who, following the deaths of his wife and son during the Great War, came to protect Zion.

=== Reception ===
Honest Hearts received mixed reviews from critics, on Metacritic scoring 66 for both PS3 and PC, and 64 for Xbox 360. Dan Whitehead of Eurogamer referred to it as a "survivalist's dream", due to the main game's traditional healing item, stimpacks, being largely substituted with fruit and meat found around the DLC's map. He praised the inclusion of a unique enemy, the Yao Guai, and a powerful weapon, the She's Embrace, but critiqued the quest designs, describing them as being non-optional fetch quests. He further stated that he found the ending simple and disappointing.

Since the DLC's release, Randall Clark – colloquially nicknamed "the Survivalist" – has become one of the Fallout fandom's most popular characters, due to his story's tragic nature. Former Obsidian employee John Gonzales described Clark as "one of [his] favorite bits of content that [he's] written in a game".

== Old World Blues ==
Old World Blues is the third downloadable content pack for Fallout: New Vegas. It takes place at a vast complex filled with scientific laboratories, called the Big MT Research Facility, and nicknamed the "Big Empty"; the primary inhabitants being the lead scientists: doctors Klein, Borous, O, 8, Dala, and Mobius, together known as the Think Tank. The story takes a humorous tone and revolves around the concept of the pursuit of science with no ultimate practical benefit. The pack features new enemies and weapons, along with a new map.

The pack released on July 19, 2011 for Xbox Live, the PlayStation Network, and Steam.

=== Plot ===
In the 21st century, Big MT served as a defense contractor for the United States military, creating numerous pieces of experimental technology, such as bodysuits able to override the motor functions of injured soldiers and return them to base, a durable ceramic-like polymer alloy called "Saturnite", cyborganic weaponry, and artificial weather, among other things. Their methods were highly unethical, however, with test subjects frequently being sourced involuntarily, including from captured Chinese soldiers in the ongoing Sino-American War. Following the Great War, the Think Tank continued their work, instead obtaining test subjects from wastelanders who stumbled across the Big Empty. These unfortunate people, known as "lobotomites", had their spines, hearts, and brains replaced with electronic equivalents in order to prevent them from escaping, as only a functioning brain was able to penetrate the radar fence surrounding the complex. These procedures consequently greatly limited their cognitive abilities.

At some point, the Think Tank transferred their brains from their human bodies into hovering mechanical chassis. Dr. Mobius realized the danger that his colleagues presented to the wasteland and hacked their brains, erasing their memories and all knowledge of the world outside the Big Empty, before trapping them in a recursion loop. He then relocated to a different part of the complex, where he constructed hostile robotic scorpions to attack the Think Tank and keep them distracted.

In 2281, while investigating a crashed satellite, the Courier is forcibly teleported to the Big Empty. Like the lobotomites, their brain, spine, and heart are replaced, but due to having previously survived being shot twice in the head, the robot performing the procedure corrects its programming upon encountering this new variable, and the Courier's mental abilities are not damaged in any way. The player meets the Think Tank and is instructed to confront Dr. Mobius for them. The Courier is first tasked with traveling around the facility, gathering technology needed to breach Mobius' defenses, all the while fighting off lobotomies, robo-scorpions, and long-dead skeletons wearing the experimental military bodysuits. Once this is complete, the player is able to speak with Mobius and optionally retrieve their organs. Afterwards, they can choose to either spare the Think Tank or destroy them.

=== Reception ===
Old World Blues received generally favorable reviews from critics, on Metacritic scoring 82, 83, and 81 for PC, Xbox 360, and PS3 respectively. Kristine Steimer of IGN claimed that the dialogue was the best part of the expansion and caused her to laugh out loud on numerous occasions. She summed up the DLC as being the typical Fallout experience but wrapped in a comedic overtone, and worth its price tag.

== Lonesome Road ==
Lonesome Road is the fourth downloadable content pack for Fallout: New Vegas, culminating the stories of the three previous DLCs. The story takes place in the Divide: a destroyed and treacherous landscape created from the simultaneous detonation of nuclear warheads located in underground silos. The Courier must confront their alleged partial participation in the Divide's creation, and determine the future of the NCR and Caesar's Legion from the main game. In addition to a new map, the pack includes new weapons, enemies, and outfits. Furthermore, gameplay involves the player detonating unexploded nuclear warheads in order to clear pathways and unlock new areas.

The pack released on September 20, 2011 for Xbox Live, the PlayStation Network, and Steam. It was originally supposed to be made available in July of that year, but unforeseen circumstances required it to be pushed back.

=== Plot ===
Before 2077, an extensive network of underground ICBM silos were built around the cities of Hopeville and Ashton, west of the Las Vegas area. The missiles never fired when the Great War occurred, and sat dormant for decades afterwards. A post-war settlement eventually emerged and began to thrive until the 2270s, when a mysterious package was shipped there to be studied. The content of the package turned out be a detonator, which remotely activated a large number of the warheads, warping the land into a massive canyon. The resulting sand storms flayed the skin of NCR and Legion troops present, turning them into ghoul-variants called marked men. Additionally, the sudden change in the environment allowed a species of mutant creatures known as tunnelers to surface.

One survivor of the destruction was a man named Ulysses, a Twisted Hairs tribesman and Caesar's Legion frumentarius who masqueraded as a package courier; he had taken up residence at the settlement in an attempt to start over, viewing it as a new nation taking its first breath. With it destroyed, he returned to Caesar and assisted the White Legs in sacking New Canaan. Afterwards, he came to realize the similarities between the Mormon town's destruction and the erasure of his own tribe's culture upon their assimilation to the Legion. Disgusted, he left the Legion once more. While working again as a package courier, he nearly took an assignment to deliver a parcel to the New Vegas Strip for proprietor Robert House, but upon learning that the next courier in line on the list was the one responsible for physically delivering the detonator, declined the job as he believed it would kill them. He soon learned, however, that the other courier ultimately survived. Seeking knowledge of the pre-war world, he briefly traveled to the Big Empty, where he met Father Elijah and pointed him in the direction of the Sierra Madre, before also meeting the Think Tank. The scientists informed him of several undetonated ICBMs still remaining at the Divide, prompting Ulysses to return there and wait.

The Courier receives a radio signal leading them to the Divide. They first explore the ruins of a missile silo, where they befriend a maintenance Eyebot constructed out of the same detonator responsible for ravaging the land many years prior. While subsequently traversing the area, they encounter hordes of marked men, deathclaws, and tunnelers. Upon reaching another silo, the player must launch an ICBM to lift the lockdown of an elevator door; the resulting explosion creates a highly radioactive location called the Courier's Mile. After surviving an onslaught of enemies during the elevator ride down, the player escapes the facility and continues on their trek.

Eventually, the Courier meets Ulysses face-to-face, who reveals that the former was the one who brought the detonator to the old settlement, and that he plans to launch missiles at both the NCR and the Legion in order to reshape the wasteland and build a new nation, much like the Courier had reshaped the Divide. The player must then either engage in battle with Ulysses or convince him to back down, then decide whether to abort one or both launches with the help of the Eyebot companion, or let them strike the intended targets.

If the player allows a missile to fire, they are able to return to the main story map and visit a unique location where the nuke hit.

=== Reception ===
Lonesome Road received mixed reviews from critics, on Metacritic scoring 62, 63, and 57 for the PC, Xbox 360, and PS3 respectively. PC Gamer's Richard Cobbett criticized the linear gameplay and minimal sidequests. He also described the character of Ulysses as "not worth the wait". Kevin VanOrd of GameSpot echoed the claims of linearity, but praised several scripted events that take place throughout the expansion, stating that while they don’t feel very Fallout-esque, they are otherwise effective.

== Courier's Stash ==
Courier's Stash is a combination of the Caravan, Mercenary, Classic, and Tribal pre-order bonus packs. It provides the player with supplies, outfits, ammunition, and unique weapons, available from the start of the game.

The pack was released alongside Gun Runners' Arsenal on September 27, 2011 for Xbox Live, the PlayStation Network, and Steam.

=== Reception ===
Courier's Stash received mixed reviews from users, scoring a 5.8, 6.6, and 6.5 for PC, Xbox 360, and PS3 respectively on Metacritic.

== Gun Runners' Arsenal ==
Gun Runners' Arsenal provides several unique weapons, weapon modifications, and ammunition types for the player to use. Furthermore, the pack adds a series of challenges to complete, taking place across the game's main story.

The pack was released alongside Courier's Stash on September 27, 2011 for Xbox Live, the PlayStation Network, and Steam.

=== Reception ===
Gun Runners' Arsenal received mixed reviews from users, scoring a 6.9, 7, and 5.4 for PC, Xbox 360, and PS3 respectively on Metacritic.

== See also ==
- Fallout 3 downloadable content
- Fallout 4 downloadable content
