= Aliens: Crucible =

- Aliens: Crucible main menu concept
- Developer: Obsidian Entertainment
- Director: Josh Sawyer
- Designer: Josh Sawyer
- Writer: Chris Avellone
- Series: Alien
- Engine: Onyx
- Platforms: Microsoft Windows; Xbox 360; PlayStation 3
- Genre: Role-playing video game
- Mode: Single-player

Aliens: Crucible is a cancelled third-person role-playing video game, developed by Obsidian Entertainment for Microsoft Windows, Xbox 360 and PlayStation 3. It was announced on December 13, 2006, by Sega. The game was going to run on an earlier version of the "Onyx" engine, which would later be used in the games South Park: The Stick of Truth and Dungeon Siege III.

Aliens: Crucible would have stood out for its unique setting. The dark and somber universe of the Alien franchise would have been unique among role-playing games of the time. The story would have taken place on the planet "Caldera" and would have followed a group of workers who band together to survive a Xenomorph infestation in a large space colony. Each customizable survivor would have had their own attributes, strengths, and weaknesses.

When Aliens vs. Predator was announced in 2009, Sega announced that development of Aliens: Crucible had been "suspended indefinitely". No explanation was given. It was reported that several employees of Obsidian Entertainment had lost their jobs.

After Creative Assembly presented Alien: Isolation (then known as Alien Year Zero) in April 2009, Sega canceled the RPG project in favor of Creative Assembly's project. The game was officially canceled in June 2009, despite Obsidian claiming that the game was nearly complete. Both Sega and Obsidian confirmed its cancellation, and Obsidian removed its Aliens RPG forum shortly afterward.

It was reportedly difficult for Obsidian to promote the game to executives. It has been suggested that some considered the "Alien" universe unsuitable for a role-playing game.

Writer Chris Avellone described the game as "basically Mass Effect, but scarier".

An interview with a former developer of the game revealed that in-game resources would have been limited and characters would have died permanently. One interesting feature would have involved a player being attacked by a Facehugger; the other players would have had the option to "put him out of his misery, put him to sleep and wake him up gradually if they needed him, or let him explode; but the bottom line was that, once impregnated, he had an expiration date."

The game was also set to feature a command wheel that could be used to give orders to squadmates.

In terms of expanding the story, the game was set to detail Caldera's backstory and even explore the relationship between the Xenomorphs and the Engineers.
