= Josh Sawyer =

American video game designer

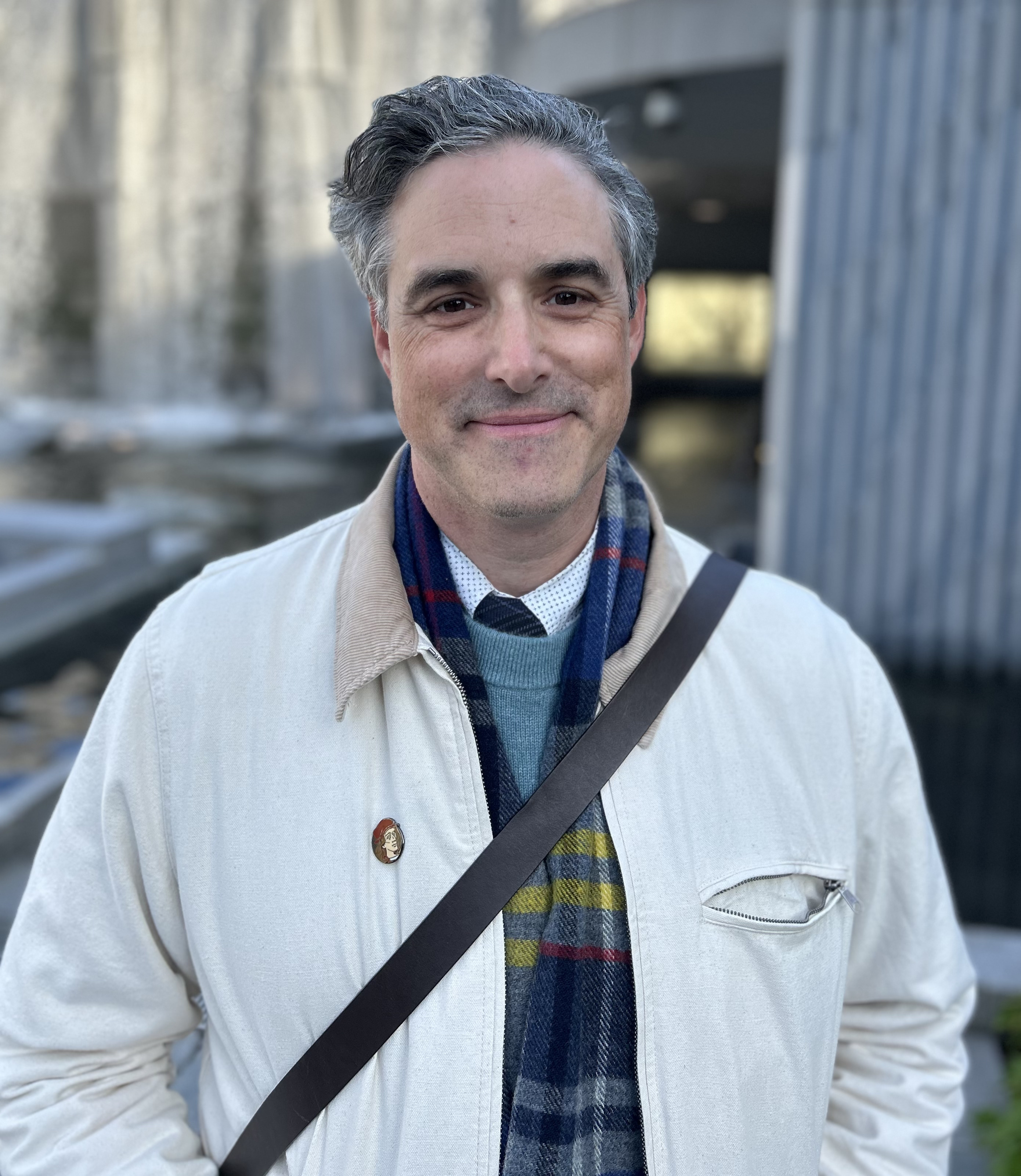
- Sawyer at the Game Developers Conference in San Francisco, 2025
- Born: Joshua Eric Sawyer; October 18, 1975 (age 51); Fort Atkinson, Wisconsin, U.S.
- Other names: J.E. Sawyer; JSawyer
- Education: Lawrence University
- Occupation: Game designer
- Employer: Obsidian Entertainment
- Known for: Icewind Dale, Neverwinter Nights 2, Fallout: New Vegas, Pillars of Eternity, Pentiment
- Parent: Gerald P. Sawyer (father)

Joshua Eric Sawyer (born October 18, 1975) is an American video game designer, known for his contributions to role-playing video games. Sawyer's work as a designer began with the Icewind Dale series in the early 2000s; he was later a project director on games like Fallout: New Vegas (2010), as well as Pillars of Eternity (2015) and its sequel, Pillars of Eternity II: Deadfire (2018). Sawyer was also the game director and narrative director of Pentiment (2022), an adventure role-playing game. Since 2005, he has been employed by Obsidian Entertainment, where he holds the position of studio design director.

== Early life and education ==
Sawyer grew up in Fort Atkinson, Wisconsin, and is the son of Linda Sawyer and sculptor Gerald P. Sawyer. He is of German ancestry.

Sawyer majored in history at Lawrence University in Appleton, Wisconsin, after initially starting out as a voice student. Sawyer continued his involvement in theater and music, including directing a production of Assassins his junior year, and minored in theatre. He also began learning web design and Adobe Flash, which sparked his interest in joining the game industry out of college.

== Career ==
Starting as a web designer at Black Isle Studios in 1999, Sawyer quickly worked his way up the ladder to an associate designer position and then lead designer on Icewind Dale II. While at Black Isle he was known for coming up with the "Ex-Presidents" project naming system.

In November 2003, Sawyer announced his departure from Black Isle to pursue other projects. He had been working as lead designer of the eventually canceled Fallout 3 (codenamed Van Buren) alongside Chris Avellone. Interplay went on to close Black Isle two weeks after Sawyer's departure.

On July 19, 2005, GameSpot reported that he had left Midway's Gauntlet: Seven Sorrows and was accepting a position at Obsidian Entertainment, a studio founded and staffed by many veterans of Black Isle. His first role was as the lead designer for Neverwinter Nights 2.

He later acted as the project director and lead designer of Fallout: New Vegas. In December 2011 Sawyer publicly released a New Vegas mod designed for his own personal use adding a large variety of small tweaks to the game ranging from rebalancing the karma of certain characters to slowing down the level up speed. As of November 2012, this mod had been updated to version 5.1.

He also served as the project director and lead designer on the Aliens RPG. Sega, the game's publisher, subsequently canceled the project, resulting in layoffs at Obsidian. According to Obsidian CEO Feargus Urquhart, the game - titled Aliens: Crucible - "looked and felt like it was ready to ship".

In 2012, with Obsidian on the brink of financial disaster after the cancellation of another project by a publisher, Sawyer proposed the company return to its design roots by making an isometric RPG in the style of those created at Black Isle. Arguing there was a market for this type of game among fans, Sawyer suggested turning to the platform Kickstarter to secure funding for development without a publisher. He succeeded in persuading company leadership, and the resulting game, Pillars of Eternity, met its Kickstarter funding goal of 1.1 million dollars in 27 hours. It ultimately raised nearly four million dollars, setting a Kickstarter record at the time. Sawyer later served as director and narrative designer on its sequel, Pillars of Eternity II: Deadfire, which was also crowdfunded and released in 2018.

Sawyer's next project was a departure from fantasy CRPG games. He pitched a smaller project that is more focused on history, inspired by tales about 16th century German artists like Albrecht Dürer. The game is called Pentiment, and focuses on a murder mystery in 16th century Bavaria. The player takes control of the main character Andreas, a young artist working in a monastery. The game was released on November 15, 2022, for Xbox, Xbox Game Pass and Windows platforms.

In July 2026, it was announced as part of restructuring by Microsoft, that Obsidian games would be the developers of a new untitled Fallout game, and that Josh Sawyer would again serve as project director. To accommodate this project, Obsidian canceled the planned sequel for Avowed.

== Games ==
Year	Title	Role
2000	Icewind Dale	Designer
2001	Icewind Dale: Heart of Winter	Designer
2002	Icewind Dale II	Lead designer
2005	Gauntlet: Seven Sorrows	Lead designer
2006	Neverwinter Nights 2	Lead designer
2010	Alpha Protocol	Additional designer
2010	Fallout: New Vegas	Project director; lead designer
2010	Fallout: New Vegas: Dead Money	Lead systems designer; narrative designer
2011	Fallout: New Vegas: Honest Hearts	Project director; narrative designer
2011	Fallout: New Vegas: Old World Blues	Lead systems designer; narrative designer
2011	Fallout: New Vegas: Lonesome Road	Lead systems designer; narrative designer
2011	Fallout: New Vegas: Gun Runners' Arsenal	Project director
2015	Pillars of Eternity	Project director; lead designer; additional writer
2018	Pillars of Eternity II: Deadfire	Project director; narrative designer
2022	Pentiment	Game and narrative director
