= Fallout: New California =

- Developer: Radian-Helix Media
- Publisher: Radian-Helix Media
- Programmers: Brandan Lee; Rick Hukkanen; Freddie Farnsworth
- Series: Fallout
- Engine: Gamebryo
- Platform: Microsoft Windows
- Release: October 23, 2018 (BETA 200)
- Genre: Action role-playing
- Mode: Single-player

Fallout: New California is a fan-made modification and unofficial prequel to the action role-playing video game Fallout: New Vegas, made by Brandan Lee and Radian-Helix Media. It was released in two installments, with the first installment released on May 31, 2013, and the second installment released as a beta on October 23, 2018. Originally known as Fallout: Project Brazil, the modification was renamed to Fallout: New California on September 1, 2017.

In April 2018, the project entered private beta for the second installment. The public beta for Fallout: New California was released as planned on October 23, 2018.

== Development ==
Project lead Brandan Lee of Radian-Helix Media, LLC was inspired by the games Fallout and Fallout 2 from Black Isle Studios. With the help of friends in the film, TV, radio, and live theater industries, Lee set out to create a modification of Fallout 3 for people who appreciated the style of the original Black Isle games. According to Lee, the mod was first conceptualized in 2010, but development didn't begin until 2012, with a prototype being released for Fallout 3, and the first full installment being released for New Vegas. Lee states that he headed a team of three people, with occasional community donations, who would spend four years creating the modification; eventually ending up with 5,000 lines of dialogue from twenty different actors and three hours of gameplay for the first installment alone. Lee named the mod "Project Brazil" partly due to inspiration by the Terry Gilliam film Brazil, and as a nod to Black Isle Entertainment through the Irish myth of the mythological island of Brasil.

90% of Project Brazil's assets for BETA 1.0.0 were created between January 2012 and May 2013, when the story was refined after a year-long break away from the project. Lee created a worldspace the size of that found in Bethesda's Fallout 3, and wrote the dialog in tandem with level and character design. Freddie Farnsworth joined in January 2013 as lead project technician; applying a global NavMesh, and re-rendering the level of detail mesh on a computer custom built for the task. In 2017, the project was renamed to Fallout: New California.

While in development, the final installment promised to expand upon the mod with new quests and factions. There are over 16,000 lines of dialogue in BETA 200.

The mod received an official release on GOG in July 2026, requiring the original game in order to be played.

== Gameplay ==
Fallout: New California was split into two installments, the first was released in 2013, and the beta for the second installment was released on October 23, 2018. As with Fallout 3 and Fallout: New Vegas, Fallout: New California has a radio station that comments on the actions of the player as the story progresses. The radio stations in Fallout: New California debuted with a completely original soundtrack. The player's S.P.E.C.I.A.L statistics have a greater impact on dialog choices with NPCs and player skills than in Fallout: New Vegas.

== Story ==
Fallout: New California was planned to be broken into three segments but, by December 13, 2013, the third installment was scrapped. The first installment was released on May 31, 2013, the second installment was released on October 23, 2018. There are 13 possible endings. The remaining two installments are separated into a prequel and three "chapters." The story takes place in 2260, 21 years before the start of Fallout New Vegas.

The first installment is set in Vault 18, located near the San Bernardino Mountains in the Cajon Pass, after the events of Fallout 2. Vault 18 is described as a secluded community. In the past, its residents included explorers who traveled the outside world as the "Wasteland Scouts", becoming legends for their adventures. However, after making too many enemies, the vault has cut itself off from the outside world. The aging vault population is in decline, and many of its youth are adopted from the wasteland, descended from mysteriously vanished tribes formed by former vault dwellers who left to settle the wasteland. The player and their siblings originate from one such missing tribe.

Within the game, the player can choose to be either a Warrior or a Scientist. It is revealed that one of the prominent members of the vault is part of the Enclave, after which the vault erupts into civil war, with the player being able to side with the Enclave or defend Vault 18. The first installment has around three hours of gameplay, and seven hours including all of the branching content.

The second installment, released on October 23, 2018, focuses on the player's struggle for survival in the world outside Vault 18 amidst a growing territorial conflict between two major factions. The first is the growing New California Republic (NCR), trapped in domestic turmoil amid its imperialistic vision to unify all of California, led in the region by the hawkish General William Silverman. The second is the Raider Alliance, a loose confederation of tribes, rebels, criminals, and others displaced by and radicalized against the NCR, led by the psychotic warlord Juan Maxson-Elsdragon. Two other main subfactions are the Bishops, a criminal mob family with control of NCR politics represented by Senator Paul Duville, and the Nanjima Shi, a clan of samurai-styled Japanese warriors within the Raider Alliance led by the warlord Kieva Nanjima.

== Reception ==
Project Brazil was ninth on Mod DB's Top Mods of 2013 list. Fallout: New California was first place in both Players Choice and Editors Choice for Mod DB's 2018 Mod of the Year, and was also added to the site's Mod Hall of Fame.
