= Pentiment (video game) =

2022 video game

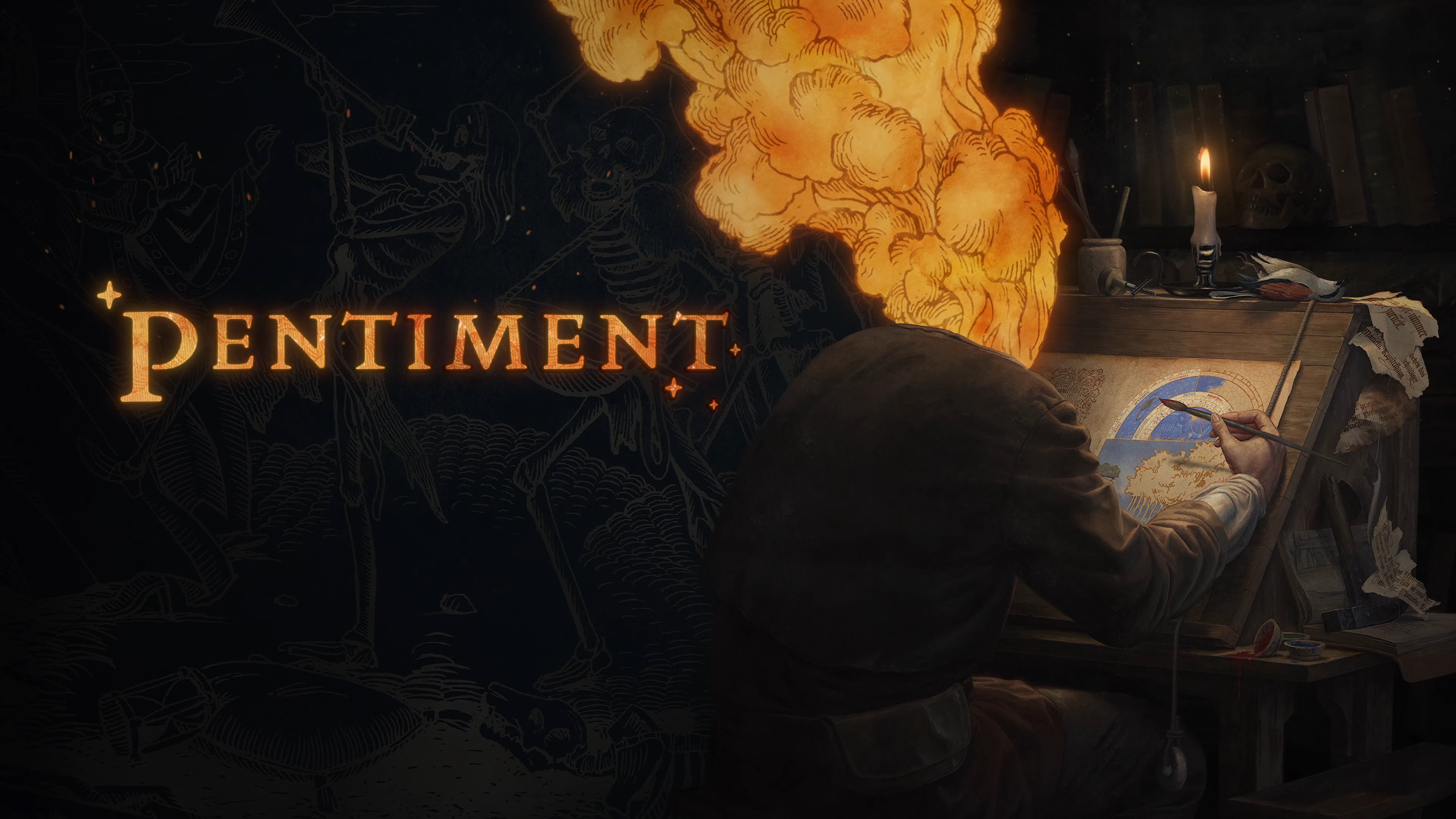
- Developer: Obsidian Entertainment
- Publisher: Xbox Game Studios
- Director: Josh Sawyer
- Producers: Alec Frey; Mary Mutter
- Designer: Matthew Loyola
- Programmer: Brett Klooster
- Artist: Hannah Kennedy
- Writer: Josh Sawyer
- Composer: Alkemie Early Music Ensemble
- Engine: Unity
- Platforms: Windows; Xbox One; Xbox Series X/S; Nintendo Switch; PlayStation 4; PlayStation 5
- Release: Windows, Xbox One, Xbox Series X/S; November 15, 2022; PS4, PS5, Nintendo Switch; February 22, 2024
- Genres: Adventure, role-playing
- Mode: Single-player

Pentiment is a 2022 adventure role-playing video game developed by Obsidian Entertainment and published by Xbox Game Studios. The player is tasked with investigating the murders of prominent individuals. The game was released for Windows, Xbox One, and Xbox Series X/S on November 15, 2022. The Nintendo Switch, PlayStation 4, and PlayStation 5 versions were released on February 22, 2024. It received positive reviews from critics and won a Peabody Award in 2023.

== Gameplay ==
Pentiment is a narrative adventure role-playing video game played from a 2D perspective. The player takes control of Andreas Maler, a wandering journeyman painter from Nuremberg who becomes embroiled in a series of murder mysteries in Upper Bavaria. The story is set in the fictional Alpine town of Tassing and the nearby Benedictine Kiersau Abbey during the 16th century, and takes place over the course of 25 years.

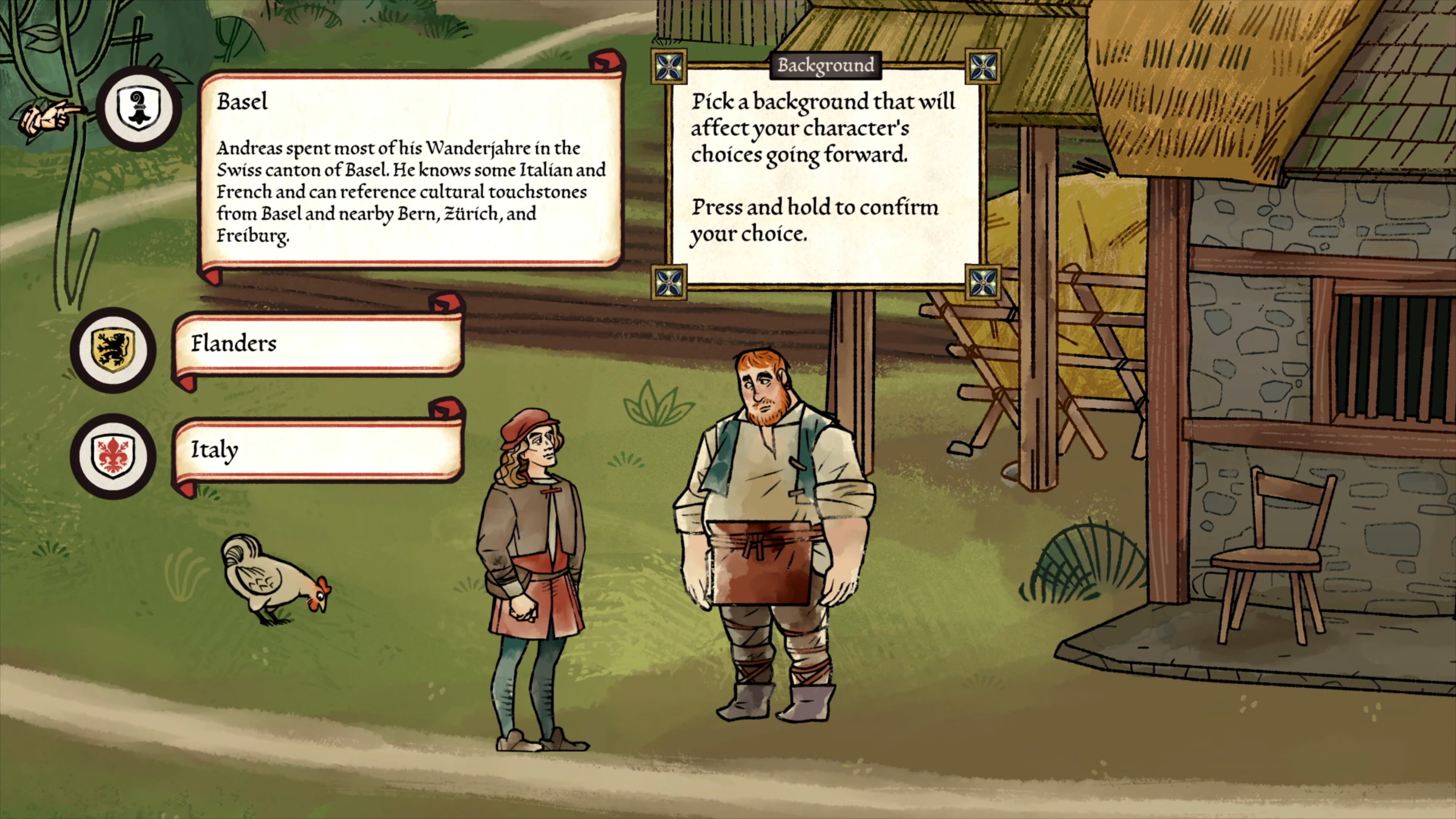
Gameplay screenshot

The player is tasked with investigating the murders of prominent individuals for which other townsfolk have been accused for various reasons. After collecting physical proof and gleaning information from townsfolk, the player is meant to accuse an individual based on either who they think committed the crime or who most deserves punishment. Concurrent with the overarching murder plot are other crimes and conspiracies as well as insights into the history of the area. Throughout the game, the player is also presented with the option to define Andreas' personal history through dialogue trees, including his previous travels, language skills and academic background, which can affect how the mysteries are resolved.

== Plot ==
In 1518, Andreas Maler is serving an apprenticeship as an illuminator at Kiersau Abbey near Tassing. Baron Lorenz Rothvogel, a friend of the Prince-Bishop of Freising and longtime benefactor of Kiersau, pays a visit to check on a manuscript he commissioned. Unhappy with the work of the illuminator, the elderly Brother Piero, he insists that Andreas complete the remaining illustrations. The baron is found stabbed to death the following day. Fearing that the murder could damage Kiersau's reputation and lead to its dissolution, Abbot Gernot blames Piero for the crime and has him detained until the archdeacon can conduct an inquiry. Andreas believes Piero is innocent, however, and begins an investigation of his own. He soon discovers several townspeople had reasons to murder the baron, and each received a mysterious note trying to manipulate them into attacking him. Andreas presents his evidence to the archdeacon, and one of the suspects is executed.

In 1525, Andreas returns to Tassing to find the town on the verge of revolting against the abbot's heavy taxation, having been inspired by the Twelve Articles. The leader of the rebellion, Otto Zimmermann, is found dead, and the townspeople accuse the abbot of the murder and threaten to storm the abbey. Andreas once again investigates the crime and finds several townspeople received the same kind of mysterious notes he found seven years earlier, all trying to manipulate them into killing Otto. He makes an accusation against one of the suspects, who flees to the mill and is killed when the townspeople burn it down. The townspeople then set fire to the abbey and its library; Andreas runs into the flames to save the books and is presumed dead. The Duke of Bavaria's soldiers arrive to restore order, killing many of the townspeople in the aftermath.

In 1543, the player assumes control of Magdalene Druckeryn, a young printer and artist. The town council hires her father, Claus Drucker, to paint a mural depicting Tassing's history, but Claus is wounded by an unknown attacker and left bedridden. Magdalene takes up his job and begins piecing together the town's controversial past. She also discovers that Andreas survived the fire and lived as a hermit in the ruins of the abbey for twenty years. The two discover a Roman temple below the town's church and find out that the town's priest, Thomas Sprecher, was the mastermind behind the events. Thomas, not wanting the townspeople to discover that the town's patron saints were actually reinterpretations of Mars and Diana, orchestrated the murders as well as the attack on Claus. He then collapses the temple to prevent its discovery, killing himself in the process. Andreas and Magdalene escape, and the latter decides to finish the mural. Claus eventually dies of his injury, and Magdalene decides to leave Tassing for Prague, while Andreas remains in the town to start a new life.

== Development and release ==
Game developer Josh Sawyer, who has a degree in history from Lawrence University and studied the Holy Roman Empire, had long sought to make a historical game. He first pitched what would become Pentiment to Feargus Urquhart in the 1990s, when the two were working at Black Isle Studios. He was inspired by the historical fiction of Darklands, a 1992 role-playing video game by MicroProse that combined the Middle Ages with supernatural themes. Urquhart thought it would have little appeal outside of history aficionados, and the project did not materialize. When the two reunited at Obsidian Entertainment years later, Sawyer revived the concept following the release of the 2018 Pillars of Eternity II: Deadfire. He reframed the game as a narrative adventure with mystery components and gameplay similar to Night in the Woods, Mutazione and Oxenfree. Urquhart accepted the pitch and a small development team was assembled, commensurate with the game's niche attraction. Sawyer and art director Hannah Kennedy worked as the initial team of two; later the team was expanded to 13 people.

Sawyer decided on setting the game in the 16th century, an era of great upheaval that saw the beginning of the Reformation, the outbreak of the German Peasants' War and the rise of Copernican heliocentrism. He cited Umberto Eco's The Name of the Rose, which also takes place within the confines of a monastery, as the primary inspiration for Pentiment's physical setting. The character of Andreas Maler was in part inspired by Albrecht Dürer, who also hailed from Nuremberg. According to Kennedy, Dürer's status as a pioneer of the self-portrait resonated with the game, the key theme of which is the artist's self-discovery.

The game's art style is a mix of late medieval manuscripts, early print, and woodcuts at the transition from late medieval to early modern art. Sawyer credited Kennedy's art style and interest in the concept as being vital to the project's early support. The team looked at the Nuremberg Chronicle, as well as illuminated medieval manuscripts in the Getty Museum and Huntington Library for inspiration. Manuscript expert Christopher de Hamel, Lawrence University professor Edmund Kern and Winston E. Black of St. Francis Xavier University served as historical consultants on the game.

Sawyer designed the game's investigations around the ambiguity of historical evidence. The player lacks modern forensic methods and must draw conclusions based off "rumor and innuendo". Sawyer stated one of his goals was to "try to get players to understand and sympathize with people from the past".

The music for the game was composed and performed by Alkemie Early Music Ensemble. Game director Josh Sawyer stated, "[Alkemie is] a music group, they compose and record as an ensemble...the music they've contributed to the game is either strictly historical or historically inspired." Kristin Hayter (as Lingua Ignota) also composed the song "Ein Traum" for the game.

Microsoft's acquisition of Obsidian in 2018 brought the game accessibility and localization support, such as a mode with easier-to-read typefaces, features like text to speech, and robust translations for non-English speakers in a text-heavy game.

Obsidian Entertainment formally announced Pentiment in June 2022 at the Xbox & Bethesda Games Showcase. The game was released for Windows, Xbox One, and Xbox Series X/S on November 15, 2022, while the Nintendo Switch, PlayStation 4, and PlayStation 5 versions were released on February 22, 2024.

In 2025, Pentiment was one of several games that were affected by a security vulnerability in the Unity engine; it was removed from digital storefronts from October 3 to October 7, 2025 to address the issue.

== Reception ==
Reception

Aggregate scores
Aggregator	Score
Metacritic	PC: 88/100; XSXS: 86/100
OpenCritic	86/100; 88% Critics Recommend

Review scores
Publication	Score
Destructoid	9/10
Electronic Gaming Monthly	5/5
Eurogamer	Recommended
GameSpot	6/10
GamesRadar+	4.5/5
Hardcore Gamer	4/5
IGN	10/10
PC Gamer (US)	88/100
PCGamesN	7/10
Shacknews	8/10
The Guardian	4/5
VG247	5/5

Pentiment received "generally favorable" reviews from critics, according to review aggregator website Metacritic.

IGN praised the time pressure mechanic, saying it made the game more tense and added replayability: "you're never given enough time to pursue them all [leads]. This added some welcome tension and forced me to make a lot of interesting decisions". Destructoid praised how there was no "golden route," with each decision having its pros and cons. GamesRadar+ loved the setting, feeling it captured the anxiety of the time: "the dawning of a new age is palpable, and the struggle to come to terms with it rumbles furiously throughout, whether from monks still painstakingly scribing tomes... or young firebrands who've learned to read and question authority". While criticizing the unclear choice mechanic, PC Gamer enjoyed the town characters and the role that they play in the story: "over 25 years of chats, shared meals... That makes it all the harder when you want to condemn a family man for a crime he might not actually have committed".

The Guardian liked the writing of the game, saying that "the dialogue drips with fascinating historical detail, supported by an extensive glossary of terms". PCGamesN disliked the pacing, saying it was "told at something between walking pace and the movement of tectonic plates". Polygon praised the art style, feeling the drawings "immediately bring a sense of style to what otherwise might be a dry history".

=== Accolades ===
Year	Award	Category	Result	Ref.
2023	New York Game Awards	Big Apple Award for Best Game of the Year	Nominated	
2023	New York Game Awards	Statue of Liberty Award for Best World	Nominated	
2023	19th British Academy Games Awards	Artistic Achievement	Nominated	
2023	19th British Academy Games Awards	Narrative	Nominated	
2023	Nebula Awards	Nebula Award for Best Game Writing	Nominated	
2023	23rd Game Developers Choice Awards	Game of the Year	Nominated	
2023	23rd Game Developers Choice Awards	Innovation Award	Nominated	
2023	23rd Game Developers Choice Awards	Best Narrative	Won	
2023	23rd Game Developers Choice Awards	Best Visual Design	Nominated	
2023	Golden Joystick Awards 2023	Xbox Game of the Year	Nominated	
2023	84th Annual Peabody Awards	Interactive & Immersive	Won	
