= Fallout: New Vegas =

2010 video game

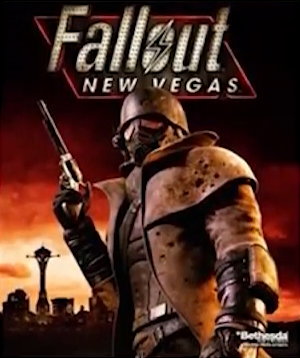
- Developer: Obsidian Entertainment
- Publisher: Bethesda Softworks
- Director: Josh Sawyer
- Producers: Mikey Dowling; Jason Fader; Matt Singh; Tess Treadwell
- Designer: Josh Sawyer
- Programmer: Frank Kowalkowski
- Artist: Joe Sanabria
- Writer: John Gonzalez
- Composer: Inon Zur
- Series: Fallout
- Engine: Gamebryo
- Platforms: Windows; PlayStation 3; Xbox 360
- Release: NA: October 19, 2010; AU: October 21, 2010; EU: October 22, 2010
- Genre: Action role-playing
- Mode: Single-player

Fallout: New Vegas is a 2010 action role-playing game developed by Obsidian Entertainment and published by Bethesda Softworks. The game, which was released for Microsoft Windows, PlayStation 3, and Xbox 360, is set in the Mojave Desert 204 years after a devastating nuclear war. The player controls a courier who survives an assassination attempt and becomes embroiled in a conflict between different governing factions that are vying for control of the region. Fallout: New Vegas features a freely explorable open world, and the player can engage in combat with a variety of weapons. The player can also initiate conversations with non-player characters in the form of dialogue trees, and their responses determine their reputation among the many different factions.

After the release of Fallout 3 in 2008, Bethesda contracted Obsidian to develop a spin-off game in the Fallout series. The developers chose Las Vegas, Nevada, and the surrounding Mojave Desert as the setting because they evoked the 1950s imagery the series was known for, as well as the post-apocalyptic setting of Mad Max. Project director Josh Sawyer wanted the story to focus on greed and excess, and used the history of Las Vegas as an inspiration. To design the game's map, Obsidian used data collected by the United States Geological Survey and reference photographs taken by Sawyer. Bethesda gave Obsidian 18 months to develop New Vegas, which several journalists have noted is a very short time in which to develop a AAA game.

Fallout: New Vegas was a commercial success and is estimated to have sold 11.6 million copies worldwide. Critics praised the writing and quests, but questioned the lack of significant gameplay changes when compared to Fallout 3, and criticized the numerous glitches present at launch. Six pieces of downloadable content for the game, including four story-based add-ons that added new areas for the player to explore, were released. Since its release, fans and journalists have re-evaluated New Vegas and it is now regarded as one of the best games in the Fallout series (Note: Attributed to multiple references:) and as one of the greatest video games ever made. (Note: Attributed to multiple references:)

== Gameplay ==
Fallout: New Vegas features a wide variety of weapons that players can use in combat. Here, the player fights an enemy known as a Deathclaw with a varmint rifle.

Fallout: New Vegas is an action role-playing game that can be played from either a first-person or a third-person perspective. It is set in the Mojave Desert in 2281, 204 years after a nuclear war that decimated much of the United States. The player controls a courier who survived an attempted killing by an unknown assailant. The initial goal is to complete a series of quests to find the assailant; the game eventually culminates in a war between governing factions that are vying for control of the Hoover Dam and Mojave Desert. In addition to the main quests, the player can participate in optional, unrelated side quests. Kristinie Stiemer of IGN estimates completing every quest takes around 100 hours.

New Vegas features a freely explorable open world map. The player can explore locations ranging from small settlements and abandoned buildings to large locations like the Hoover Dam and the city of New Vegas, which was built from the remnants of Las Vegas. The player is equipped with the Pip-Boy 3000, a wearable computer that serves as a menu and allows them to access items they have acquired, view detailed character statistics and active quests, and look at the map. They can also use the Pip-Boy to fast travel to previously discovered locations, and listen to makeshift radio broadcasts.

The player can engage in combat with non-player characters (NPCs). The weapons include firearms, energy-based guns, melee weapons, and explosives. Guns can be equipped with additional modifications such as a scope. While in combat, the player can use a gameplay mechanic known as the Vault-Tec Assisted Targeting System (VATS), which pauses the game and allows the player to target specific body parts of an enemy. VATS is dictated by a statistic known as Action Points. Attacks made using VATS cost Action Points; when the player runs out, they must wait a short period before they can use VATS again. Some NPCs can be recruited as companions, and will accompany the player and assist them in combat.

=== Role-playing mechanics ===
At the start of the game, the player can customize the courier's appearance by choosing their gender, age, and race (Asian, White, Black, or Hispanic). They can then allocate points into seven primary attributes: strength, perception, endurance, charisma, intelligence, agility, and luck. These attributes are known as "S.P.E.C.I.A.L" stats. There are 13 secondary attributes whose point totals are affected by S.P.E.C.I.A.L stats: barter, energy weapons, explosives, guns, lockpick, medicine, melee weapons, repair, science, sneak, speech, survival, and unarmed. If the player has a high intelligence stat, for example, they will be more proficient in the medicine, repair, and science skills at the beginning of the game. The player can add more points into skill stats whenever they earn enough experience points to level up. Experience points can be earned through several methods, such as killing an enemy or completing a quest. When the player reaches an even-numbered level, they can select a permanent, beneficial upgrade known as a perk. For example, the Rapid Reload perk increases the reload speed for guns by 25 percent.

The player can initiate conversations with NPCs in the form of dialogue trees. For example, early in the game a doctor tells the player that they nursed them back to health and looked through their belongings for identification. The player can then choose to respond with one of the following dialogue options: "Thanks for patching me up, Doc.", "You shouldn't have gone through my stuff.", and "What do I do now?" Some response options are only available if the player has enough points in a certain skill, such as 50 points in the Barter skill to ask a shopkeeper for a discount, or an Intelligence of 7 to impress someone. The responses the player chooses during conversations with NPCs as well as any previous actions determine their reputation among the in-game factions. For example, if the player decides to help a faction, they may be given new armor or access to a secret base. If the player's actions are perceived as detrimental, a faction might send assassins to try and kill the player. Some factions dislike one another; if the player is helpful to one, they may be unable to complete quests for another. Reputation extends to companions; some companions will leave the player if a specific faction dislikes the player.

An optional difficulty level in Fallout: New Vegas is Hardcore Mode, which adds survival mechanics that the player must keep track of. For example, the player must routinely eat, drink, and sleep to avoid dying from starvation, dehydration, or sleep deprivation. Healing items gradually heal wounds but crippled limbs can only be healed by doctors, sleeping in a player-owned bed, or special medication. Ammunition has weight, which necessitates careful inventory management, and companions can permanently die. Hardcore Mode can be enabled or disabled at any point, but if the player completes the entire game with it enabled, they unlock an achievement.

== Plot ==
=== Setting ===
Flag of the New California Republic, based on the Flag of California

Fallout: New Vegas takes place in 2281, 204 years after a devastating nuclear war between the United States and China, known as the Great War. Three major factions vie for control of the Mojave Desert, known in-game as the Mojave Wasteland: the New California Republic (NCR), a democratic republic attempting to restore representative government and maintain law and order; Caesar's Legion, a violent totalitarian army of tribal slavers inspired by the Roman legion; and Mr. House, a reclusive New Vegas businessman who commands an army of Securitron robots and rules as the city's technocratic dictator. As part of an eastward expansion from California, the NCR took control of the Hoover Dam, which provides electricity to the surrounding area. Both Caesar's Legion and Mr. House seek to control the Hoover Dam for themselves and advance their own plans for the region. Minor factions include the Boomers, a heavily armed xenophobic tribe at Nellis Air Force Base; the Powder Gangers, escaped convicts from an NCR correctional facility; the Great Khans, a tribe of drug dealers; the Brotherhood of Steel, a paramilitary organization that aims to secure and hold pre-war technology; and the Followers of the Apocalypse, a humanitarian organization providing education and medical services to the impoverished people of the New Vegas outskirt areas.

=== Story ===
While delivering a data storage device known as the platinum chip to New Vegas, the courier is ambushed by mobster and casino operator Benny, who steals the chip and shoots them twice in the head. A Securitron personality named Victor digs out the courier from a shallow grave, and physician Doc Mitchell nurses them back to health. The courier departs to search for Benny and the chip, confronting him in his casino on the New Vegas strip; the courier can either kill Benny and recover the platinum chip or let him escape, in which he is captured by Caesar's Legion.

The courier's actions attract the attention of the NCR, Caesar's Legion, and Mr. House, who each attempt to recruit them to aid in their efforts. It is revealed Mr. House survived the nuclear apocalypse in a life-support chamber. He created the platinum chip, which contains a program capable of upgrading his Securitron army; the device was initially meant to protect Las Vegas during the Great War, but the war began before it could be delivered. After the platinum chip was located, the courier was tasked with delivering it to Mr. House, but Benny stole the chip as part of a plan to usurp Mr. House with the assistance of a reprogrammed Securitron called Yes Man.

Hoover Dam becomes the center of the conflict between the NCR and Caesar's Legion. The player can choose which faction to support, resulting in one of four endings. If the player supports the NCR, they successfully repel the Legion's attack at Hoover Dam and annex the Mojave Wasteland into the Republic. If the player supports Caesar's Legion, they force the NCR to retreat as the Legion conquers New Vegas and the surrounding area. If the player supports Mr. House, the overwhelming Securitron army forces both the NCR and the Legion to withdraw, securing control of the region for House alone. Alternatively, the player can usurp Mr. House and take control of the Securitron network themselves with the help of Yes Man, establishing an independent New Vegas.

== Development ==
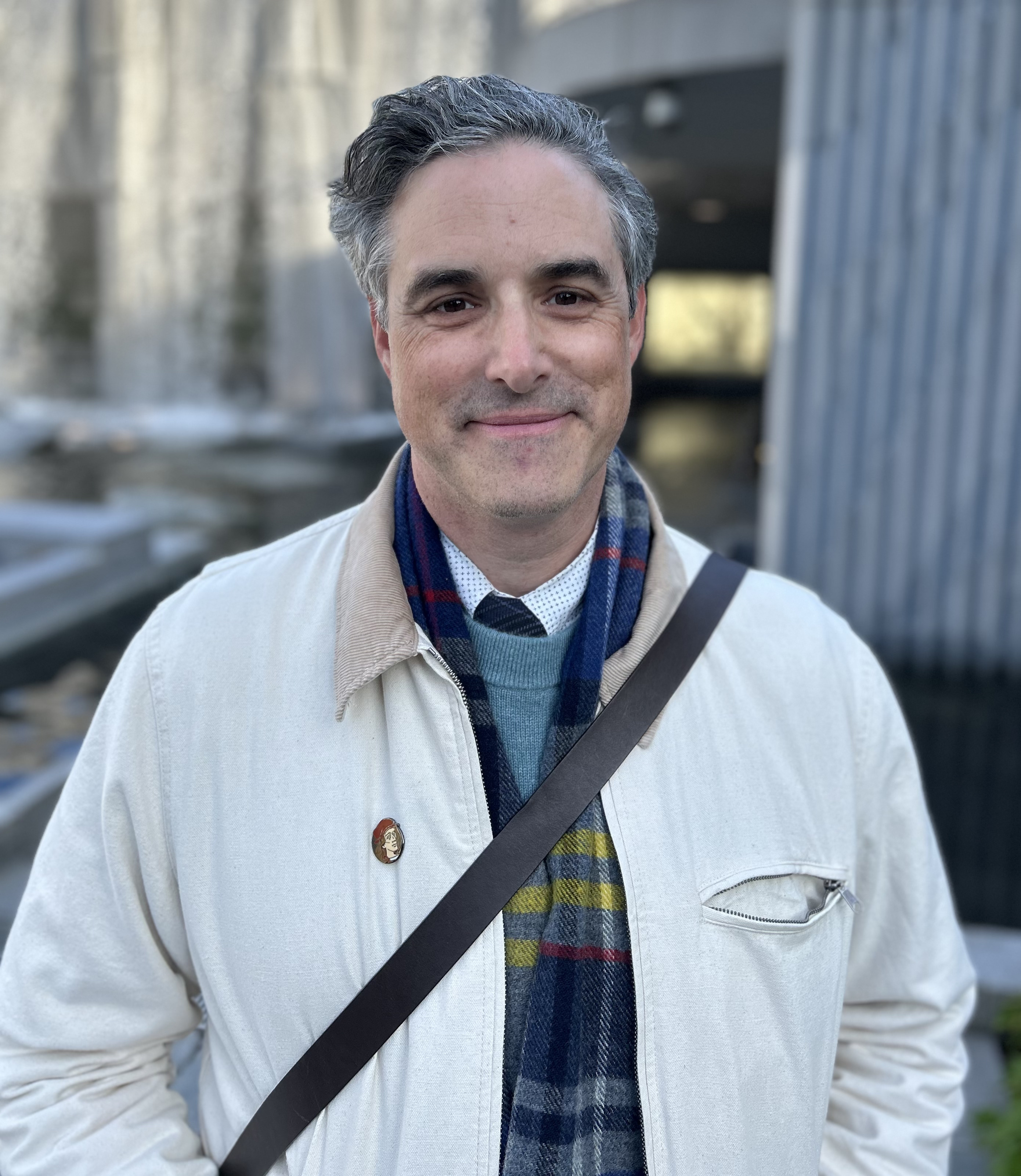
Josh Sawyer was the project director for Fallout: New Vegas.

=== Van Buren and Bethesda purchase ===
Fallout: New Vegas began with the cancellation of Van Buren, which was intended to be the third game in the mainline Fallout series. Black Isle Studios was set to develop a real-time game with turn-based combat set across Arizona, Colorado, Nevada, and Utah. The game was cancelled in December 2003 following the financial issues faced by Black Isle Studios' publisher, Interplay Entertainment. Prior to Van Buren's cancellation, former Black Isle and Interplay staff cofounded Obsidian Entertainment. Over the next few years, Obsidian developed the role-playing games Star Wars Knights of the Old Republic II: The Sith Lords, Neverwinter Nights 2, and Alpha Protocol, and a canceled Alien role-playing game.

In 2007, Bethesda Softworks purchased the Fallout intellectual property. The following year, Bethesda released Fallout 3, which was well received by critics and sold over five million copies in 2008. Prior to the release of Fallout 3, Bethesda had already started development on The Elder Scrolls V: Skyrim. Bethesda wanted to support Fallout 3 with more content and decided to contract another developer to create a large expansion pack. Bethesda's creative director, Todd Howard, lobbied for a full game instead of an expansion pack and, based on their experience with the Fallout series, suggested Obsidian. In 2007, Obsidian had rejected an offer from Bethesda to develop a Star Trek game but agreed to develop a spin-off from the Fallout main series.

=== Early development ===
Bethesda wanted the game to take place on the West Coast of the United States, where the first two Fallout games are set, and Obsidian felt a similar setting would allow them to expand concepts introduced by Fallout 2, like the New California Republic. Other proposals included setting the game in a city based on Reno, Nevada, and allowing the player to play as a human, a ghoul, or a super mutant. The latter idea was rejected due to the technical challenges posed by armor-wearing ghouls and super mutants. The developers chose to set the game in Las Vegas and the surrounding Mojave Desert because they evoked the 1950s imagery for which the series was known and the post-apocalyptic setting of Mad Max. At the behest of project director Josh Sawyer, Obsidian repurposed digital assets from the canceled Alien game for Fallout: New Vegas. According to Sawyer: "[I] did not want to disrupt our pipelines at all. We basically want to use what's there – add to it, don't change it ... and make great content". Obsidian wanted New Vegas to take place between the events of Fallout 2 and Fallout 3, although Bethesda mandated each game in the series should follow chronological order.

Sawyer wanted the story of Fallout: New Vegas to focus on greed and excess. The history of Las Vegas served as an inspiration due to that city's connection with organized crime. One of the working titles for the game was Fallout: Sin City. Sawyer used the assassination of John F. Kennedy in 1963 as a cut-off for any historical references. The game's narrative was structured around factional conflict as a result of fan feedback. Sawyer felt the factions would realistically be most concerned about access to water in the desert setting and Hoover Dam became a focal point for worldbuilding. During a Game Developers Conference presentation, Sawyer noted Obsidian wanted to avoid what he described as "Jesus/Hitler" moments, where factions like the NCR and Caesar's Legion were presented as straightforwardly good or evil, and aimed to make player choices come with moral trade offs.

=== Design and gameplay ===
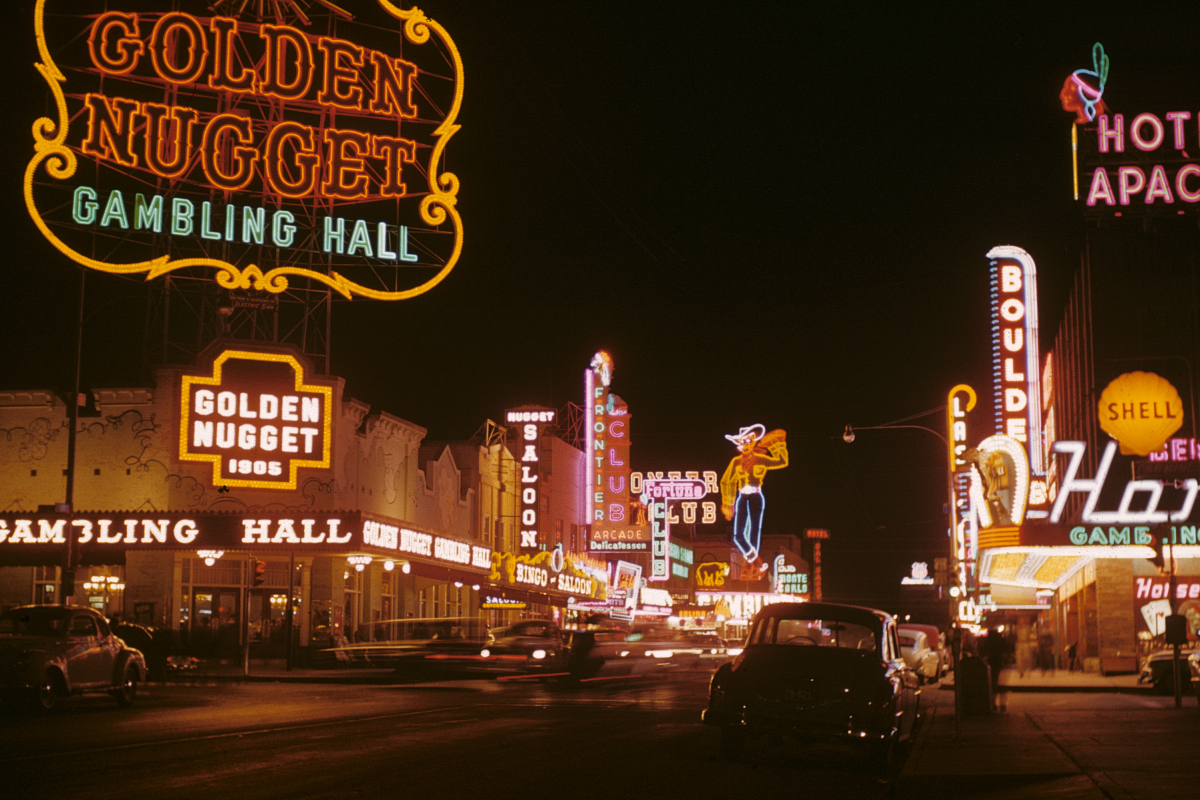
Obsidian designed the city of New Vegas to resemble Las Vegas in the 1950s.

To capture the ambiance of the Mojave Desert, Obsidian used data collected by the United States Geological Survey (USGS). Sawyer traveled to Las Vegas and took reference photographs of the surrounding areas, including the nearby Red Rock Canyon National Conservation Area. Obsidian used the Las Vegas Beltway as a point of reference while designing the map because they felt circling the map with a road network would help the player navigate. Bethesda requested the inclusion of large structures to serve as visual landmarks for the player. While Fallout 3 uses monuments in Washington, D.C., as visual landmarks, New Vegas uses kitschy roadside attractions, such as a large dinosaur statue based on the Cabazon Dinosaurs in Cabazon, California. These attractions were motivated by a goal to differentiate New Vegas from Fallout 3. Locations within New Vegas are more spread out when compared to Fallout 3, which largely centered around the Washington, D.C. metro. Other differences include a warmer color palette for the graphics, and the inclusion of local flora, such as Joshua trees and prickly pear cacti. Obsidian wanted New Vegas to closely resemble the Las Vegas Strip in the 1950s; this means each casino is adorned with large neon signs, and their architecture is modeled on the contemporary Googie movement.

The gameplay of New Vegas remained largely unchanged from that of Fallout 3. Obsidian instead focused on making minor adjustments, such as giving the player more tactical options while in combat. The player could now use iron sights on guns, and accuracy was greatly affected by player movement. Optional gameplay mechanics that would further evoke a sense of desert survival skills, such as item-crafting, and Hardcore Mode, were added. According to Sawyer, the feature was added to provide an optional difficulty increase for players. Obsidian was inspired by the Fallout 3 modding community, specifically the mods that sought to improve the game with quality of life changes. Bethesda provided Obsidian with the Gamebryo engine, which had been used for Fallout 3. No Obsidian staff had worked with Gamebryo, so the company hired a modder with experience making mods for The Elder Scrolls IV: Oblivion.

=== Audio ===
Inon Zur composed the soundtrack of Fallout: New Vegas, which was intended to evoke the soundscape of the American Southwest. While working on the soundtrack, Zur received an email that included the descriptors: "Southwest in the Future. Open, Spacious, Raw, Lonesome, Cowboy, Rattlesnake, Desert, Wind, Heat, Rust, Steel, Dirt, Grit." Zur was inspired by the soundtrack for the film There Will Be Blood; he worked with audio director Scott Lawlor to compose music for a string quartet. New Vegas has an adaptive music system, which means the soundtrack will change depending on what is happening to the player. While exploring, the music is quiet and ambient but becomes loud and powerful when the player enters combat. In addition to the original soundtrack, New Vegas includes licensed music to which the player can listen via in-game radio stations. The licensed music includes songs from the 1950s and several music genres, including country and bluegrass. Over 65,000 lines of dialogue were recorded for New Vegas, which set a Guinness World Record for the most lines of dialogue in a single-player role-playing game. The game also includes celebrity voice acting from Rene Auberjonois, Felicia Day, Dave Foley, John Doman, Michael Dorn, Kris Kristofferson, Zachary Levi, Wayne Newton, Ron Perlman, Matthew Perry, William Sadler, and Danny Trejo.

=== Challenges and cut content ===
Bethesda gave Obsidian 18 months to develop Fallout: New Vegas, which several journalists noted is a very short time in which to develop a Triple-A game. When asked about the hastened development, Sawyer said: "We were working somewhere between forty and fifty hours a week, which is not too crazy ... It was a really tight schedule, but I don't think we had a point where we all thought 'this is crazy we can't do it.'" Obsidian's lack of experience with the Gamebryo engine hindered development. Programmers had to routinely run maintenance on the engine, and struggled to implement the Havok software, which was a requirement for console games. Sawyer recalled a specific moment when Obsidian received console development kits. They found the New Vegas Strip was not properly optimized, and had to split the area into sections that are separated by loading screens rather than being a single, continuous section.

The contracted development and decision to release the game on consoles meant some areas of the game needed to be cut. For example, there were planned settlements east of the Colorado River, including three locations that would have been controlled by Caesar's Legion and would have provided more information about the faction. Additionally, Obsidian intended to give players the option to continue exploring the map after the story concluded, as opposed to an abrupt cessation of gameplay. Little work had been put into designing post-story content once the beta stage of the development cycle had been reached, and Obsidian decided to prioritize optimization instead of adding content into an already unstable game. Designer Chris Avellone noted that the post-story content would have been small, such as additional dialogue options with NPCs and changing the location of NPCs in accordance with the ending the player chose.

== Release and downloadable content ==
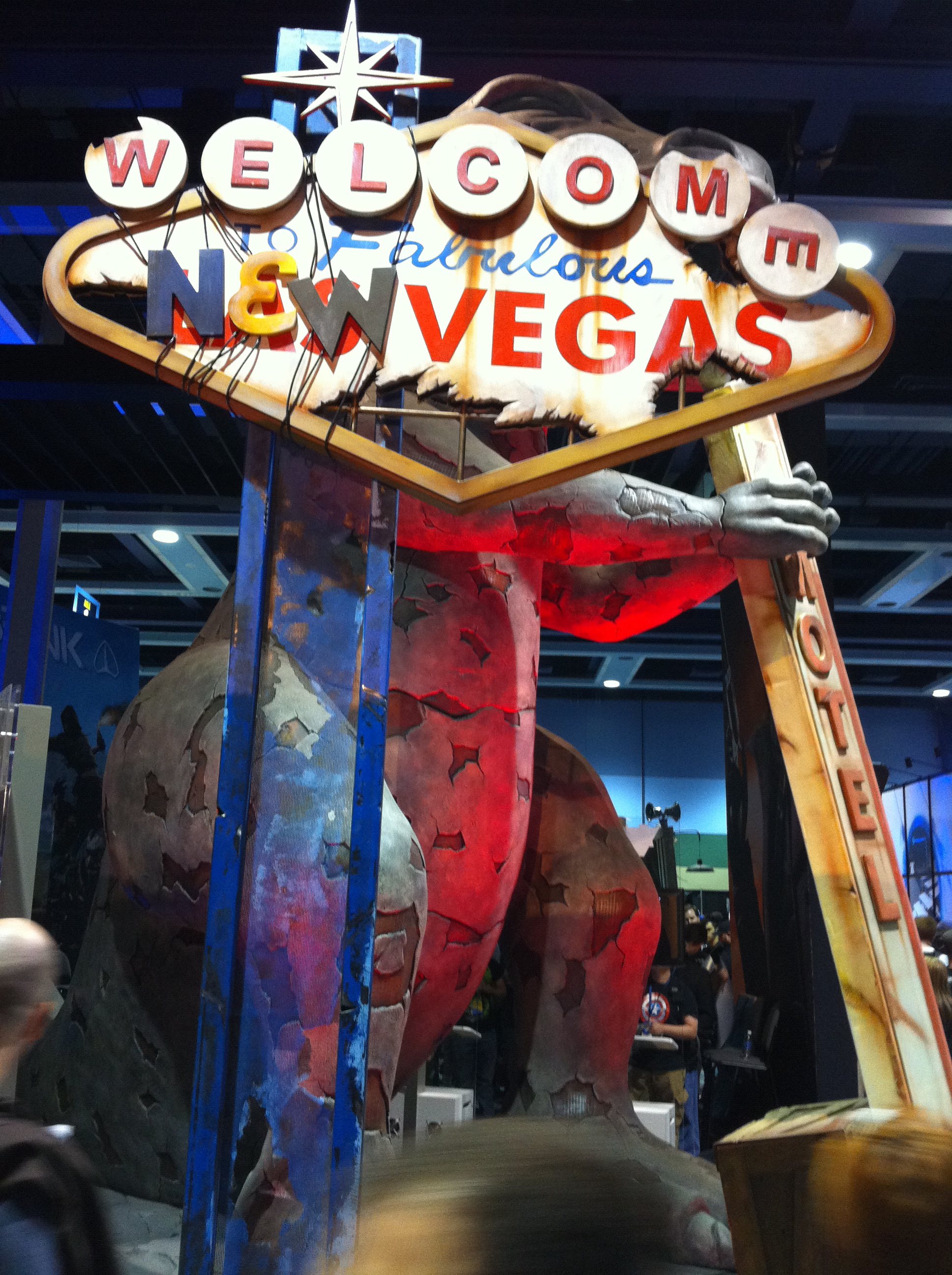
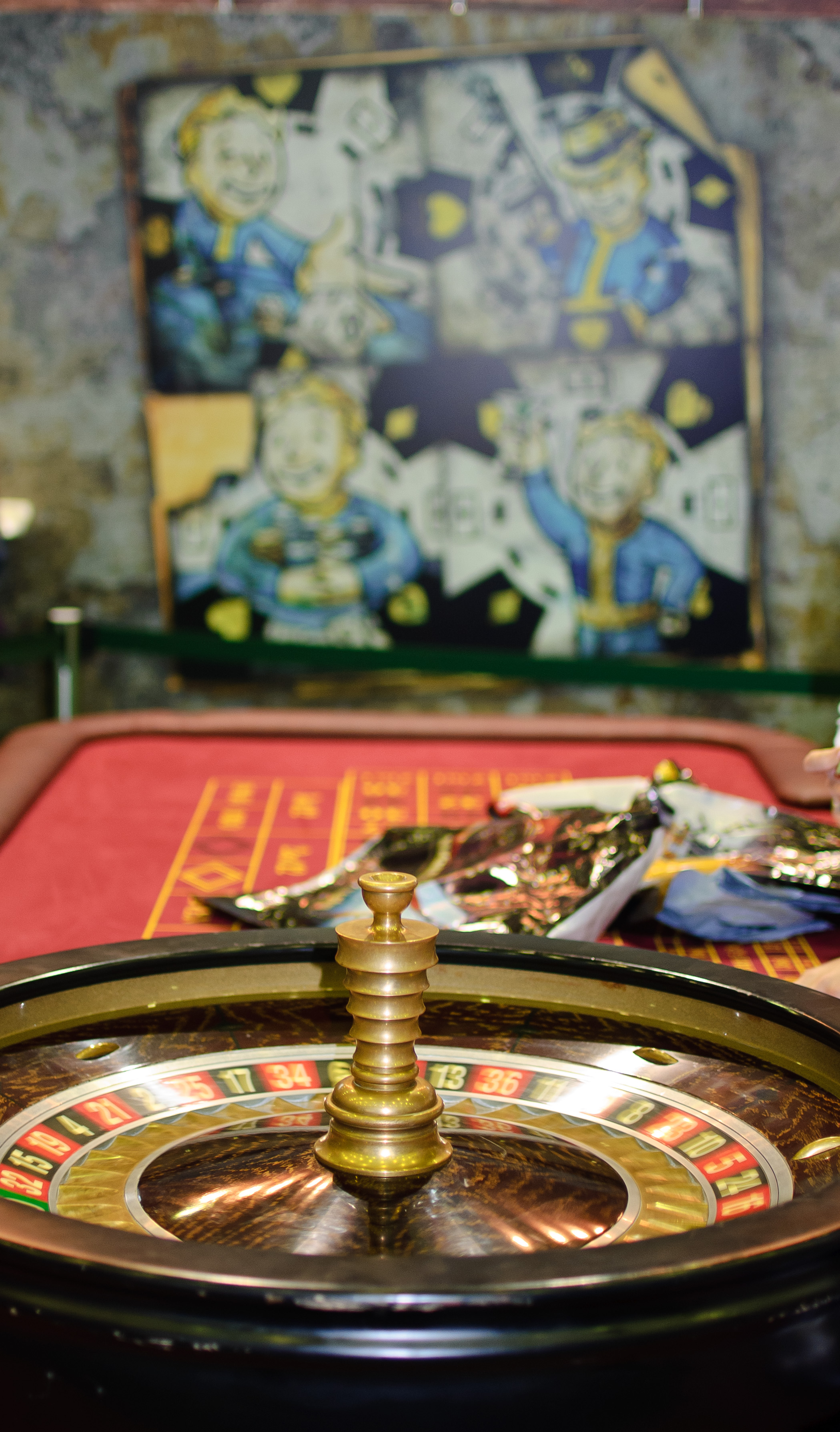
Promotional material for Fallout: New Vegas at PAX (left) and IgroMir (right)

Fallout: New Vegas was announced in April 2009, and the first trailer was shown in February 2010. Four pre-order bonuses were available for players who pre-ordered the game from Amazon, Best Buy, GameStop, Steam, and Walmart. Each pre-order bonus included weapons and items the player could access at the beginning of the game. A collectors' edition, which included the game, seven poker chips, a replica of the platinum chip, a deck of cards with character illustrations, a prequel graphic novel, and a making-of documentary, was announced in May 2010. Pre-order sales for Fallout: New Vegas were higher than those for Fallout 3 in North America and the United Kingdom.

Fallout: New Vegas was released in North America for Microsoft Windows, PlayStation 3, and Xbox 360 on October 19, 2010; October 21 in Australia; and October 22 in Europe. By November 8, the game had sold five million copies worldwide and garnered $300 million in revenue. The market-research firm Electronic Entertainment Design and Research estimated by 2015, the game had sold 11.6 million copies worldwide. Fallout: New Vegas suffered from numerous glitches upon release, including crashes, corrupted saved games, and frame rate issues. Fans and video-game journalists criticized the large number of glitches. Months after release, Bethesda published patches to fix the glitches.

Fallout: New Vegas was supported with six downloadable content (DLC) add-ons, whose development was led by Avellone. Avellone's goal was to expand the game's story and incorporate gameplay ideas that would not have worked in the base game. Avellone cited the survival horror elements of the DLC Dead Money as an example. Avellone said: "It would feel weird if you designed even maybe a big Fallout New Vegas level around that. But as a DLC, it felt like, 'Oh, cool. This is my trip to a horror realm.' " In Dead Money, the courier is captured and forced to stage a heist on the Sierra Madre Casino & Resort, which is concealed by a cloud of deadly toxic vapor. The second DLC was Honest Hearts, which is set in Zion National Park and revolves around the courier's involvement in a conflict between several tribes. The third DLC, Old World Blues, features B movie humor and a plot about a group of mad scientists. The final story-driven DLC was Lonesome Road, in which the player tracks another courier named Ulysses, who rejected the job of delivering the platinum chip to Mr. House. Two additional, non-story-driven DLC add-ons were released: Courier's Stash granted access to items that were originally released as pre-order bonuses; and Gun Runners' Arsenal added new weapons, firearm modifications, and new types of ammunition.

In 2026, Bethesda announced remasters of New Vegas and Fallout 3 were in development.

== Initial reception ==
Fallout: New Vegas

Aggregate score
Aggregator	Score
Metacritic	84/100 (PC); 82/100 (PS3); 84/100 (X360)

Review scores
Publication	Score
1Up.com	B
Edge	6/10
Eurogamer	9/10
G4	4/5
Game Informer	8.5/10
GameSpot	8.5/10
GameSpy	4.5/5
IGN	8.5/10
Official Xbox Magazine (UK)	9/10
Official Xbox Magazine (US)	9.5/10
PC Gamer (UK)	84/100

Upon its release, Fallout: New Vegas received positive reviews from critics. Bethesda offered Obsidian a bonus payment if any version of the game received a rating of 85/100 or higher on the review aggregator website Metacritic. New Vegas missed the threshold by one point; Metacritic assigned it a weighted-average critic score of 84/100 for the Windows and Xbox 360 versions, and an 82/100 for the PlayStation 3 version. When asked about narrowly missing the threshold, Obsidian CEO Feargus Urquhart said: "It was in the contract, it was what it said. We didn't put it in there and we signed it. I wasn't crying over it by any stretch of the imagination." Bethesda's decision to use Metacritic's rating as a determinant for bonus payment was criticized; journalists said Metacritic lacked the objectivity needed to measure the quality of a game.

Fallout: New Vegas's story and writing were well received, and were consistently highlighted in reviews. Craig Pearson of PC Gamer described the story as a significant improvement over that of Fallout 3, and appreciated the way factions adapt to the player's choices and previous actions. The British version of Official Xbox Magazine called the story "staggering in scope and consistent in quality", and particularly praised the final quest. Despite their enjoyment, some critics bemoaned the lack of memorable story moments when compared with Fallout 3. Game Informer's Andrew Reiner wrote: "Obsidian's writing is top notch (especially the dialogue), and I wanted to see more from most of the characters I met, but none of the scripted moments deliver the nuclear bang that Bethesda achieved".

The side quests received praise, and some reviewers said they are more interesting than the main story. Kevin VanOrd of GameSpot greatly appreciated the number of solutions each quest offers, such as a quest that allows the player to either fight robots in an abandoned museum or steal a keycard and avoid confrontation. Reiner offered similar commentary, and said: "In just the missions and story, New Vegas offers a nearly unprecedented level of depth ... it delivers a true sense of ownership over the experience and gives you thousands of reasons why you should come back and play it again and again". Kristine Steimer of IGN gave particular praise to the map, which she said acts as a catalyst to finding new side quests and unique locations.

Because Obsidian made only minor adjustments to the gameplay, some reviewers described New Vegas as a large expansion of Fallout 3 rather than a separate game. Steimer wrote: "I often want to call it Fallout 3: New Vegas. Since the first game was so widely loved, that's certainly not a bad thing, but New Vegas does feel like a giant, awesome expansion." Pearson was disappointed there were few technological advancements in New Vegas; he said: "New areas, characters and factions, but the same clunky inventory and character models. Two years to stay exactly where you were." Francesca Reyes of the American version of Official Xbox Magazine struggled to recommend the game to anyone who did not enjoy Fallout 3. The newly added gameplay mechanics, such as faction reputation and Hardcore Mode, were well received; reviewers said they add an additional layer of complexity over Fallout 3. Reviewers were divided in their opinions on the companions; Christopher Monfette of G4 said the companions provide a stronger emotional connection than any moment in the main quest, while Dan Whitehead of Eurogamer found the companions to be more trouble than they were worth due to their penchant for ignoring the commands he gave them.

Many reviewers derided the glitches, which were seen as substantive and disruptive to gameplay. Among the more common glitches noted in reviews were poor companion and enemy pathfinding, framerate issues, and crashes. Mike Nelson of 1Up.com stated that New Vegas had some of the most frustrating glitches he had ever seen, and he would have given the game a higher score had it not been for them. A reviewer for Edge wrote, "Creatively, New Vegas gets almost everything right. Mechanically and technically, it's a tragedy." Some reviewers noted that they still enjoyed the game despite the glitches. Giant Bomb's Jeff Gerstmann wrote, "[...] when I reflect on the experience, I'll probably think about the times the game locked up on me or broke in a dozen other crazy ways first, before thinking about the great world and the objectives that fill it. If you were able to look past the issues that plagued Fallout 3 and [The Elder Scrolls IV:] Oblivion before it, New Vegas will eventually show you a real good time."

Fallout: New Vegas won the 2011 Golden Joystick Award for Role-Playing Game of the Year, and the 2010 IGN award for Most Bang for Your Buck. The game was also nominated for Role-Playing/Massively Multiplayer Game of the Year during the 14th Annual Interactive Achievement Awards, but the award went to Mass Effect 2.

== Re-evaluation and legacy ==
Since its release, fans and journalists have re-evaluated Fallout: New Vegas, and the game's reception has become significantly more positive. Cass Marshall of Polygon wrote: "Fallout: New Vegas has endured in the cultural zeitgeist in a way that few other games have." Some critics have referred to New Vegas as the best game in the Fallout series (Note: Attributed to multiple references:) and as one of the greatest video games of all time. (Note: Attributed to multiple references:) In a retrospective article about the Fallout series, Ian Dransfield of Retro Gamer stated: "New Vegas served as the balance between Bethesda's new 3D approach, and Black Isle/Interplays focus on traditional [role-playing] mechanics." Eurogamer's Emma Kent wrote: "It felt like even the smallest story was carefully crafted to maintain interest and deliver a rewarding kicker ... on the macro scale, New Vegas took a more serious tone by weaving a complex power struggle that mirrors many current real-world conflicts."

Part of the game's re-evaluation comes from patches that fixed many of its glitches. Kat Bailey of VG247 noted once the discourse regarding the technical aspects subsided, players grew to appreciate the game for what it is. The subsequent DLC add-ons and the active modding community also contributed to the game's long-lasting appeal. PC Gamer's Dominic Tarason wrote: "Years of dedicated community efforts have culminated in New Vegas being a better game than ever." Notable mods for the game include Tale of Two Wastelands, which fully combines the games of Fallout 3 and New Vegas; Fallout: New California, which serves as a prequel and expands on the Courier's backstory, and others. Fallout: The Frontier, a DLC-sized expansion mod that added a new worldspace with new items, quests, and characters to the game, was the subject of media attention due to its large size and controversial content. A "vanilla-plus" modding guide, Viva New Vegas, has received widespread commendation from journalists for its bug fixes and quality of life improvements for new and returning players alike. (Note: Attributed to multiple references:)

Journalists have noted that New Vegas harbors a passionate fanbase within the Fallout fandom. Since 2022, a yearly Fallout: New Vegas-themed fan event has been held in Goodsprings, Nevada, the player's in-game starting location. Journalists have also noted that some fans negatively compare Fallout 3 and Fallout 4 with New Vegas. When compared with New Vegas, fans commonly criticize 3 and 4 for uninteresting storylines, downgraded role-playing mechanics, and limited options for player expression. Patricia Hernandez of Kotaku commented:

It sometimes seems as though you can't talk about Fallout 4 without having someone start talking about how good New Vegas is, how much they wish Obsidian, rather than Bethesda, handled modern Fallout games. It's in every comments section for the Fallout 4 articles we post, I see it on Reddit a whole lot, and I've been emailed petitions about Obsidian and future Fallout games many, many times.

New Vegas has served as an inspiration for other games. Rebellion Developments designer Ben Fisher remarked that New Vegas served as a reference point for Atomfall, a 2025 game set in an alternate history after the Windscale fire. Fisher recalled how Rebellion structured the plot of Atomfall similarly to New Vegas, in that the city of New Vegas became the focal point for the entire story. According to Fisher, "The narrative [of New Vegas] largely all reflects this key location and the events happening in that location, and all of the characters you come across are esoteric people that have a perspective on this central location ... It was a reference point for the idea of a densely concentrated RPG adventure experience." In a similar vein, WolfEye Studios co-founder Raphaël Colantonio stated that the plot of New Vegas was an important inspiration for the studio's unnamed upcoming game. Colantonio remarked, "We did like the free-form exploration of New Vegas ... We like the humor, we liked some of the possibilities - how you can go with this group or that group, and the story keeps going no matter what."

=== Television series ===
When the television series Fallout was released, the episode "The Trap" seemingly contradicts the plot of Fallout: New Vegas, which led some fans to believe Bethesda was trying to retcon the game due to their perceived disdain of its reception. When Bethesda director Todd Howard clarified the issue, PC Gamer published an article with the headline "'New Vegas is a very, very important game to us,' says mildly exasperated Todd Howard, who will never stop getting grilled about New Vegas".

The setting of New Vegas is prominently featured in the second season of the television series Fallout. The season takes place 15 years after the events of the game, and features flashbacks of Cooper Howard's character interacting with Mr. House before the Great War. IGN writer Jim Vejvoda noted the trailer referenced important aspects from the game such as Caesar's Legion and the Hoover Dam. Co-showrunner Geneva Robertson-Dworet later stated the show would not confirm which ending to the game is canon. Critics generally praised the faithful adaption of the game's environments to live action, although PC Gamer opined that the show minimized the canonical impact the courier had on the Mojave Wasteland.
