= Fallout 76 =

2018 online action multiplayer role-playing game

- Developer: Bethesda Game Studios (Note: Additional work by Bethesda Game Studios Austin as well as Arkane Studios, id Software, ZeniMax Online Studios, Iron Galaxy and Double Eleven)
- Publisher: Bethesda Softworks
- Directors: Jeff Gardiner; Jonathan Rush
- Producers: Angela Browder; Bill LaCoste
- Designers: Emil Pagliarulo; Mark Tucker; Carl McKevitt
- Programmer: Brian Baird
- Artist: Andrew Collins
- Composer: Inon Zur
- Series: Fallout
- Engine: Creation Engine
- Platforms: Microsoft Store; PlayStation 4; PlayStation 5; Steam; Xbox One; Xbox Series X/S
- Release: PlayStation 4, Windows, Xbox One; November 14, 2018; PlayStation 5, Xbox Series X/S; September 15, 2026
- Genre: Action role-playing
- Mode: Multiplayer

Fallout 76 is a 2018 action role-playing game developed by Bethesda Game Studios and published by Bethesda Softworks. It is an installment in the Fallout series and a prequel to previous entries. (Note: The opening chapter of Fallout 4 takes place twenty-five years prior to Fallout 76, but the remainder of the game takes place two hundred years later.) Initially set in the year 2102, players control a dweller of Vault 76 who must venture out into the dilapidated open world set in Appalachia in order to re-colonize the region and uncover a mysterious plague that has killed off its inhabitants.

Fallout 76 is Bethesda Game Studios' first multiplayer game. Development began in 2013, and involved a collaboration with developer BattleCry Studios. The game uses a modified version of Bethesda's Creation Engine, which allowed the accommodation of multiplayer gameplay and a more detailed game world than in previous games. Fallout 76 was reportedly subject to a troubled development, which included a restrictive crunch schedule. It saw a high turnover of staff, attributed to both a lack of leadership and clarity about the game's design, while numerous glitches were ignored by quality assurance.

Fallout 76 was initially released to generally mixed reviews, with criticism for the game's technical issues, overall design, lack of gameplay purpose, and initial absence of human non-playable characters. A number of Bethesda's responses and attempts to provide ongoing support for Fallout 76 in the months following its launch were met with criticism. In October 2019, a premium subscription service called Fallout 1st was added to the game. The first major update, Wastelanders, which introduced human non-playable characters, was released in April 2020, to more favorable reception. The game was the subject of several controversies, chiefly with regard to the quality of physical content, and is notable for its negative reception. The game sold 1.4 million copies by the end of 2018. Fallout 76 saw an increase in player count over time, peaking in 2024 with the release of Amazon Prime's television series Fallout.

== Gameplay ==
Fallout 76 is an action role-playing game that can be played from either a first-person or third-person perspective. Set in the Appalachian region of West Virginia, the player controls a character who leaves a fallout shelter 25 years after a nuclear war left much of the United States decimated. The game is entirely online, and utilizes dedicated servers. While players are able to play the game solo, they are encouraged to complete quests with other players on the server. Additionally, players can trade with each other, and engage in combat. Private servers are only available through the use of the monthly membership Fallout 1st.

Fallout 76 features an open world map that the player can freely explore. The map replicates many real locations from West Virginia, such as the cities of Charleston and Morgantown, as well as landmarks like The Greenbrier resort and New River Gorge Bridge. The game features numerous enemies, including raiders, mutated animals, and ghouls. Some enemies come from West Virginia folklore, such as the Mothman and the Flatwoods monster. The player is equipped with a wearable computer called the Pip-Boy. The device serves as a menu, and allows the player to access items they have acquired, view detailed character statistics and active quests, and look at the map. The player can use the Pip-Boy to fast travel to previously discovered locations, and as a radio to listen to makeshift broadcasts. There are a variety of weapons in the game, including standard guns, energy-based guns, melee weapons, and explosives. While in combat, the player can utilize a gameplay mechanic known as V.A.T.S., which automatically targets an enemy and displays a percentage chance of hitting the enemy with an attack. Unlike in previous Fallout games, V.A.T.S. does not pause or slow down time, and instead displays information in real time.

The player accrues experience points by completing quests, killing enemies, and crafting items. Once the player earns a certain amount of experience points, they can level up. Each level up allows the player to increase one of seven attributes: strength, perception, endurance, charisma, intelligence, agility, and luck. These attributes, known as S.P.E.C.I.A.L. stats, govern certain aspects of the player character; for example, the strength stat determines how many items the player can carry, as well as the damage of melee attacks. Additionally, the number of points the player has for a S.P.E.C.I.A.L. stat directly correlates to the number of perk cards they can use, which act as permanent beneficial upgrades. For example, the endurance perk card Rifleman increases the damage of non-automatic rifles. Perk cards can be reassigned or removed at any point in the game.

An important mechanic in Fallout 76 is the ability to build and defend bases. At the start of the game, the player is given an item called the Construction and Assembly Mobile Platform (C.A.M.P.), which allows the player to convert raw materials into base structures. C.A.M.P. bases can be placed anywhere on the map, and can be moved at anytime. At a C.A.M.P. base, the player can craft weapons, armor, and modifications. Enemies can attack bases, and the player can mitigate their attack by equipping the base with turrets and traps. If the player joins a server that already features another base where their existing base should be, the player's base will be removed, and can be replaced in a different location.

Fallout 76 features an in-game currency called atoms, which can be used to purchase items from a marketplace called the Atomic Shop. Atoms can either be purchased with real-world money through microtransactions or by completing in-game challenges, such as crafting a piece of armor or leveling up. The Atomic Shop sells cosmetic items, such as outfits and short character gestures called emotes.

== Premise ==
Fallout 76 is a narrative prequel to previous Fallout games. It is set in an alternate history, and takes place in 2102, twenty-five years after a nuclear war that devastated the Earth. The player character is a resident of Vault 76, a fallout shelter that was built in West Virginia to house America's best and brightest minds. The player character exits the Vault on "Reclamation Day" as part of a plan to re-colonize the Wasteland.

=== Plot ===
Twenty-five years after the Great War, Vault 76 is opened up and its residents given the task of repopulating the Wasteland. Shortly after they emerge from the Vault, the player character is contacted by the Vault Overseer. She reveals that Vault 76 was given a secret mandate to secure an arsenal of nuclear weapons deployed throughout Appalachia in three still-functioning nuclear missile silos: Site Alpha, Site Bravo, and Site Charlie. The player character is directed to contact the Responders, a faction of emergency services personnel who tried to aid the residents of Appalachia during the war; however, they discover that the Responders evacuated after they came under attack from the Scorched. Further investigation reveals that the Scorched are human beings infected by the "Scorched Plague", and are led by the Scorchbeasts; massive mutated bats that came into contact with an Enclave bioweapon kept in an old mining facility, causing exponential growth and a symbiotic control over the plague that created them. This relationship with the plague elevates a single Scorchbeast to the role of Queen, making it far larger and more dangerous, and allowing it to lead the legions of humans and animals in Appalachia through the use of a hivemind.

As the Scorched represent a threat to the Wasteland beyond Appalachia, the player character decides to secure a nuclear weapon and use it to destroy a Scorchbeast nest. In order to achieve this, they start searching the bunkers of survivalists calling themselves the Free States who were working on the means to detect the Scorched until the Scorched overran them. The player character is able to build a radar system that detects the viral signature of the Scorched, but its limited range makes it ineffective. The player attempts to boost the signal first by gaining the friendship of Rose, a Miss Nanny robot trying to rebuild the local Raider gangs that lived in Appalachia before being scared off by the Scorched; and by investigating research done by the local Brotherhood of Steel into the Scorchbeast as they had tried to stop it spreading from its main lair. The player hacks into a government network and draws the attention of the Enclave, the remnants of the United States government. The Enclave are led by MODUS, a centralized artificial intelligence system located in the Whitespring Bunker. MODUS asks the player character to help connect them to a series of isolated computer networks across Appalachia through the Sugar Grove SIGINT base and reestablish contact with the Kovac-Muldoon orbital platform, and in return offers to connect to the radar system to detect Scorched across the region.

Once connected to MODUS, the player gains the ability to locate the Scorchbeast nest, known as Fissure Site Prime. This nest is situated near the site where the Brotherhood of Steel had previously attempted to combat the Scorchbeast menace, ultimately meeting with failure. Guided by MODUS, the player is directed to one of three nuclear silos and launches a missile at the nest. Upon entering the irradiated area, the player discovers a laboratory at the heart of the nest, which had also been discovered by the Brotherhood of Steel. This suggests that the Scorchbeasts might have been artificially created. The missile detonation awakens a formidable Scorchbeast Queen, forcing the player to engage in combat with her. Upon vanquishing the Queen, the collective consciousness of the Scorchbeasts is shattered, and the danger they posed to the wider wasteland is neutralized. Having successfully defeated the Scorchbeasts, the player rejoins the other residents of Vault 76 in their collective efforts to rebuild the post-apocalyptic wasteland.

==== Wastelanders ====
In 2103, a year following the opening of Vault 76, individuals start to make their way back to Appalachia. Drawn by rumors of safety and hidden treasures within the mountains, these newcomers seek refuge in the region. The Vault 76 Overseer becomes increasingly concerned for their well-being due to the persisting threat of the Scorched and Scorchbeasts in Appalachia. To address this, she directs the surviving Vault 76 residents to establish connections with the new arrivals, all the while working to uncover the origin of these rumors.

Two major factions emerge among the new arrivals: the Settlers, led by Paige; and the returning Raiders, led by Meg. After the player reunites with the Overseer, they then assist the Overseer in mass-producing a vaccine at the defunct Nuka-Cola plant, which is then distributed to the population in the form of Nuka-Cola soft drinks, albeit after having to convince the faction leaders of the severity of the threat. With the Settlers and Raiders protected, the Overseer and Vault 76 resident then turn their attention to the rumors of treasure. According to the Overseer, Vault-Tec University housed a secret area where top executives would meet to discuss Top Secret corporate information. She and the resident travel to Vault-Tec University in Morgantown to learn more. They discover that Vault 79 holds the entirety of the United States' gold reserve, transferred there from Fort Knox for safe-keeping in the event of nuclear war, and is well-protected by a series of security defenses.

The resident must choose between an alliance with the Settlers or the Raiders when venturing into Vault 79 to acquire the gold. After a series of quests related to "assembling a crew", the time comes to raid the vault, wherein it is discovered that remnants of the Secret Service garrison is trapped. After deliberation with the agent in charge, the resident and their crew can agree to save the remaining agents in exchange for 1000 gold bars worth of bullion, inaccessible to the agents, and stuck in the processing room. After acquiring the bars, and lifting the accidental lockdown, the resident can divide the gold however they see fit, either keeping every bar, keeping half and giving the other half to the faction they raided with, or keeping half and giving both factions a quarter. This bullion is to be used to re-establish a gold backed currency all across America, though depending on the player's choices and greed, it could spell immense recession and strife across the region, pitting the Settlers and Raiders against each other in a battle for total conquest, and returning Appalachia to the turmoil it just broke free from.

==== Steel Dawn ====
Several months after people began returning to Appalachia, Elder Roger Maxson has sent the Brotherhood of Steel's First Expeditionary Force from New California to Appalachia to not only find out what happened to Paladin Taggerdy's Brotherhood, but to reestablish the Brotherhood's presence in the region as well. However, despite losing most of the initial group to Raider attacks on the way across the devastated United States, Paladin Rahmani, Scribe Valdez, and Knight Shin make it to Appalachia, and using the fortified ATLAS Observatory as their new base of operations, renaming it Fort Atlas, they begin to rebuild the Brotherhood's presence in the region, all while dealing with gaining the alliance and friendship of the Settlers of Foundation, and the hostility of the Raiders at the Crater, with being supported by the residents of Vault 76 with securing munitions and other resources to help protect everyone in the region from the continued threat of the Scorched and Scorchbeasts.

==== Steel Reign ====
By the year 2104, things have been going well in the Appalachian Wasteland thanks to the residents of Vault 76 and their continued support of both the Settlers in Foundation and the Raiders in Crater. However, the First Expeditionary Force of the Brotherhood of Steel is still splintered due to hostilities between Paladin Rahmani and Knight Shin over their primary objective, not helped by the continued attacks by Super Mutants and other threats released by the Enclave before they were wiped out in the years before Vault 76 opened. The residents must make a choice to decide if the primary objective for Rahmani's Brotherhood should be to support and protect the people of the Appalachian Wasteland or continue the Brotherhood's duty of securing all manner of weapons from the pre-War world to ensure they don't fall into the wrong hands. Without contact with Maxson and Lost Hills, the Brotherhood's future is dependent on the residents of Vault 76.

==== Expeditions: The Pitt ====
After being wiped out by the Scorchbeasts prior to the opening of Vault 76, the Responders have returned to Appalachia and set up their new home base at the Whitespring Resort due to its continued upkeep by the automated robot staff and security, also having gained access to a still-working Vertibird to travel beyond Appalachia to help others in need of assistance, such as those people surviving in the ruins of Pittsburgh, Pennsylvania, now known as "The Pitt" following the Great War. With the help of the residents of Vault 76, the Responders are able to aid the Pittsburgh Union, a group of survivors under attack from a raider group known as the Fanatics, and continue to aid them thanks to the Vault 76 residents to further help rebuild the United States from the ashes of nuclear annihilation.

==== Expeditions: Atlantic City ====
Come the year 2105, the Responders and residents of Vault 76 are soon called away from Appalachia to a new location that required their assistance like with The Pitt. This time, the location was Atlantic City, New Jersey, where three factions had emerged in the war-torn famous seaside resort city home to many casinos and hotels: The Showmen, the Atlantic City Municipal Government, and the Lombardi Family. Back home in Appalachia, the Russo Family had moved into the old Ingram Mansion that once belonged to the Cult of the Mothman, renovating it to a nightclub called the Rose Room. However, a hit squad targeting the Russos springs an ambush when one of the residents of Vault 76 are visiting the nightclub on opening night. Although the resident and the Russo son kill the squad, the Russo daughter starts to suffer from a severe withdrawal of a drug from Atlantic City called "Devil's Blood", and the only way to help her is to travel via the Responders' Vertibird to Atlantic City to get her another fix until a way can be found to cure her, thus having the residents travel to Atlantic City to deal with problems there as they did helping the Pittsburgh Union against the Fanatics. When they recover the blood from the legendary beast known as the Jersey Devil, their actions with the Russo patriarch will decide if the Russo daughter will stay with her family in Appalachia or disown them to be on her own because of her father's choices.

==== Skyline Valley ====
A new region south of the Savage Divide has opened up, being part of the Shenandoah National Park, known as Skyline Valley. Accessed through Vault 63 in the Ash Heap, it is discovered that the Skyline Valley is always covered by a mysterious storm created by members of Vault 63, transformed into ghouls and the weather device responsible for the storm turning them into something else entirely, dubbing them "The Lost", who appear to sound like their voices are distorted with radio static and are in constant pain. The dwellers of Vault 76 will have to support the Vault 63 survivors until making a final decision about who will take over as Overseer of Vault 63 from that point onward and what will become of the storm over the region.

==== Burning Springs ====
Answering a call for help from someone located across the state line from Point Pleasant in what's left of Ohio after the Great War, the Vault 76 dwellers end up being captured and brought before a super mutant that has established himself as ruler of the region known as the Burning Springs named the "Rust King". After proving themselves in the Rust King's arena, they then appear to help plan a rebellion against the Rust King, only to be double-crossed by one of the people involved, hoping to get into the Rust King's good graces. Once the dwellers kill the traitor, the Rust King acknowledges them as a worthy warrior for him before having them knocked out and released from his arena, allowing them to be free to explore the Burning Springs at their discretion. Along the way, the dwellers encounter The Ghoul, who currently is doing some bounty hunting in Appalachia from the local hub of Highway Town in the middle of the Burning Springs before making his way back to the New Californian Republic for personal reasons.

== Development ==
The origins of Fallout 76 date back to 2013. During the development of Fallout 4, Bethesda Game Studios began conceptualizing what a potential multiplayer game mode would look like. The ideas presented were considered too large in scope, and were set aside in favor of the single-player campaign. During this period, Jason Hasenbuhler of the then-recently formed BattleCry Studios in Austin, Texas, met with Bethesda executive producer Todd Howard. Hasenbuhler noted that several developers at BattleCry had experience with large multiplayer games like Star Wars Galaxies, and asked Howard to let the studio work on a Fallout multiplayer game using the ideas proposed. Bethesda greenlit the project after the release of Fallout 4 in November 2015. They had already begun work on downloadable content for Fallout 4 as well as preliminary work on Starfield, and felt a Fallout multiplayer game would help fill in the downtime between their games. BattleCry had recently placed their upcoming free-to-play game BattleCry on indefinite hiatus, and agreed to Bethesda's request.

Bethesda provided BattleCry with Fallout 4's Creation Engine, a game engine that had been exclusively used in single-player games. The Creation Engine proved difficult to work with, as it was still using code written for The Elder Scrolls III: Morrowind in 2002, and any part of the map the player was not currently in would not be loaded. BattleCry believed their best option to retrofit the engine with multiplayer capabilities was to implement the netcode used in older Quake games. While BattleCry worked with the engine, a small team at Bethesda's main studio in Rockville, Maryland began brainstorming the premise for the game. They decided the map needed to be larger to compensate for multiple players, and chose the Appalachian region of West Virginia as the setting. The last two Fallout games developed by Bethesda were set in major cities along the East Coast of the United States, and the team wanted to instead explore a more rural location that would not have been targeted by nuclear warfare. This meant the local flora and fauna would have largely survived and mutated, and forests could encompass parts of the map.

Fallout 76 takes place just 25 years after the Great War, which affected some decisions regarding the gameplay and plot, the largest of which was the initial decision to not include human NPCs. A behind-the-scenes documentary about the game gave two reasons for the decision. From a lore perspective, Bethesda reasoned it would take longer than 25 years for hostile factions to form and take control of the area, and from a gameplay perspective, the team wanted players to know that any human characters they ran across were in fact other players and not NPCs. Bethesda compensated for the lack of gun-wielding enemies by creating a new type of ghoul enemy that still had some mental faculties and knew how use weapons. In a 2022 retrospective article published by Kotaku, anonymous developers stated that nearly everyone at BattleCry disliked the decision to not include human NPCs, although Howard was insistent on their exclusion until after the game released. Executives at Bethesda felt it would take a significant amount of time to update the engine for multiplayer capabilities, and decided that replacing NPCs with text-based storage devices and moments of environmental storytelling would convey the same level of narrative storytelling.

=== Troubled development ===
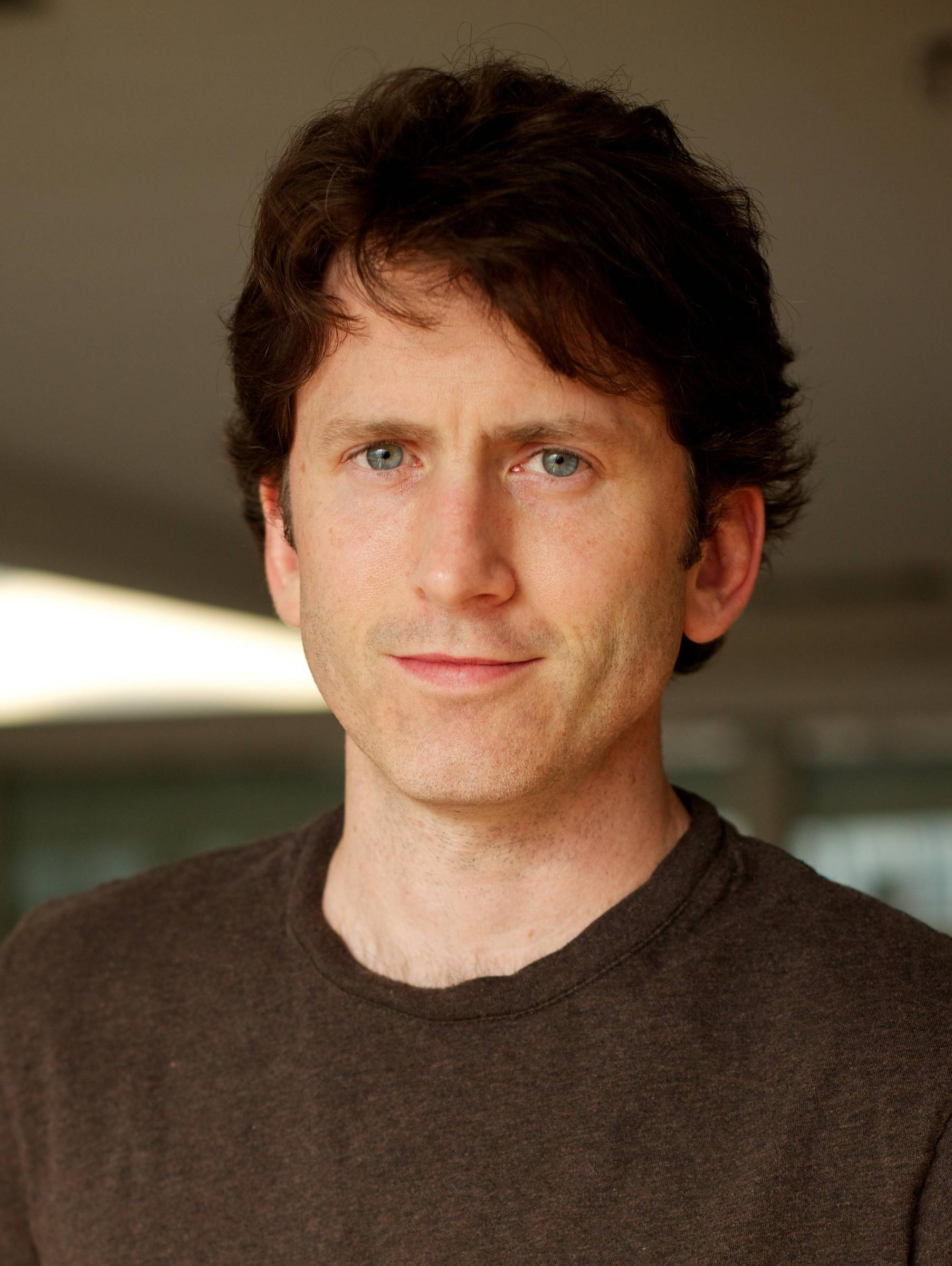
According to anonymous developers, Fallout 76 suffered from a lack of proper leadership, and Bethesda executive Todd Howard was criticized for his approach to management.

The developers interviewed for the aforementioned Kotaku article revealed that Fallout 76 had a troubled development history. One said, "No one wanted to be on that project because it ate people. It destroyed people ... The amount of people who would go to that project, and then they would quit [Bethesda] was quite high." To compensate for the turnover rate, some developers working on Starfield and the Arkane Austin game Redfall were moved onto Fallout 76. One reason attributed to why the game struggled to retain workers was the lack of leadership. Some members of BattleCry were led to believe Howard was in charge of the project, although he was in fact working on Starfield. Howard would occasionally visit BattleCry but his involvement was deemed inadequate by the developers. One developer disclosed he shot down any new ideas proposed by the design team, while another claimed he leaned too heavily into the "bigger is better" design philosophy with no thought given to how it would work.

In general, it was revealed Bethesda did not provide enough information about important aspects of the game, such as the maximum amount of players per server, or how griefing would be handled. Those interviewed also claimed there was a level of resentment toward BattleCry from the Rockville studio, particularly for Bethesda's decision to structure Fallout 76 as a live service game. The free-to-play Fallout Shelter had grossed over $100 million in four years, and as a result, Bethesda took a greater interest in games that could continuously generate revenue after their release. Emil Pagliarulo was singled out as a designer from the Rockville studio that ignored BattleCry. A developer said, "[Pagliarulo] didn't seem to want to be involved with the product at all. He didn't want to have any contact with it ... or read anything that we put in front of him." The issues of resentment were compounded as some members from the Rockville studio that were brought in to work on Fallout 76 were dismayed that they were working on a multiplayer game despite joining a studio that had exclusively produced single-player games. Another developer stated, "[Bethesda] has a lack of respect for folks who are working on things that they consider theirs."

Members of the game testing department were also interviewed for the Kotaku article, and shared similar stories about the game's development. Testers were subject to significant crunch, and the exhaustive work took a toll on their mental health. Testers dealt with what they described as "voluntold overtime"; if no one volunteered for weekend overtime hours, then the entire department would be called in. Peer pressure became commonplace among testers, as those who did not complain about the crunch had increased odds of being converted to full-time employees instead of contract workers. When these issues were brought up to the studio's parent company ZeniMax Media, it was either ignored or outright denied. Testers claimed their breaks were timed, and that some testers were even followed into restrooms by what they described as "chronic snitches".

Nearly every build for Fallout 76 during its development suffered from glitches, most of which stemmed from the Creation Engine. When asked what parts of the game were subject to glitches, one developer said, "Tongue in cheek: the whole game. In general, every major bug in 76 [that appeared at launch] was known by [quality assurance]." The engine was poorly optimized, and simply updating to a new build could potentially break the game. Game testers were forbidden from discussing problems found in the game directly to the developers, and instead had to bring up any issues with the quality assurance department. This in turn delayed work on game-breaking glitches for sometimes months. Developers assumed Fallout 76 would be delayed, but Bethesda and BattleCry worked on tight schedules, and would not delay any preset deadlines.

== Release ==
=== Pre-release ===
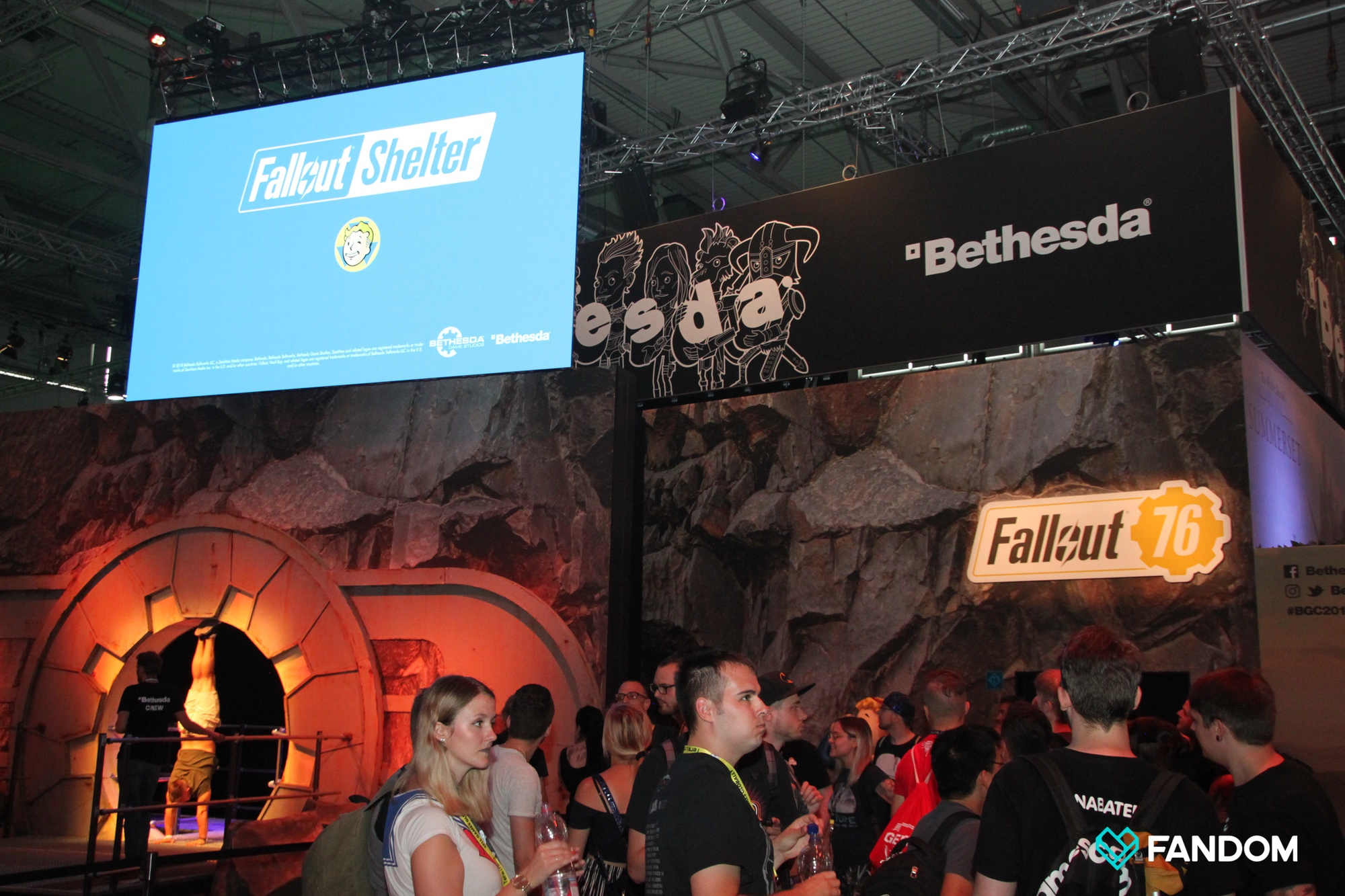
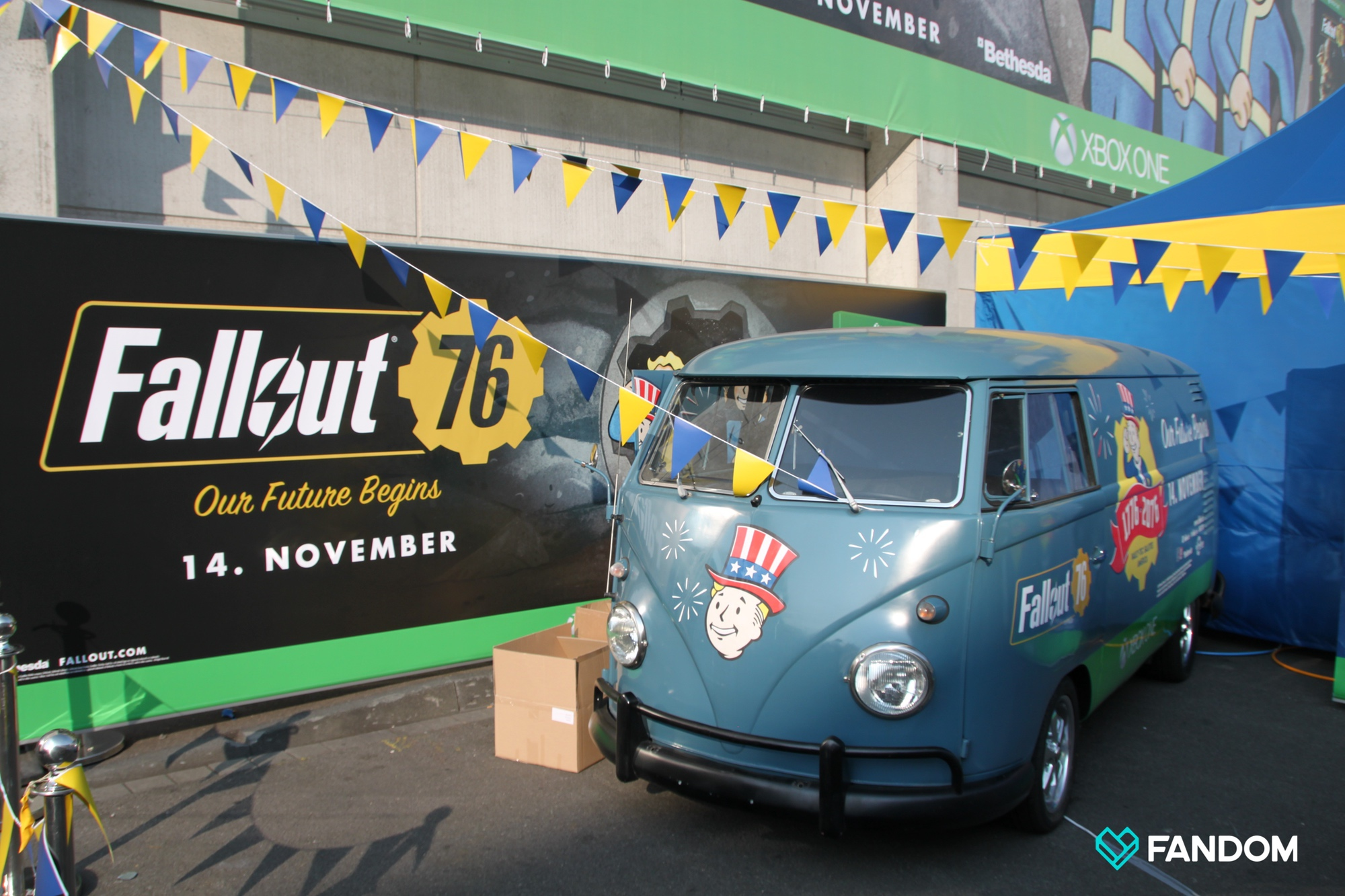
Promotional material for Fallout 76 at Gamescom 2018

Fallout 76 was announced on May 30, 2018; the announcement was preceded by a twenty-four-hour live stream on Twitch showing a Vault Boy bobblehead toy in front of a monitor with a "Please Stand By" test pattern screen, a signature image of the series. This stream was watched by a total of over two million people, with more than one hundred thousand people watching at any time.

Details of the game were announced by Bethesda Executive Producer Todd Howard during Bethesda's press conference at E3 2018 on June 10, 2018, including its anticipated release date of November 14, 2018. As it is Bethesda Game Studios' first experience with a fully online game, Howard confirmed that there would be an open beta phase, beginning on October 23, 2018, for Xbox One, and October 30, 2018, for PlayStation 4 and PC.

In response to the announcement that Fallout 76 would feature only multiplayer, a petition was created by fans of the series which called for the game to include a single-player mode. The petition received thousands of signatures within a day. Following the game's announcement, there was a burst of interest in tourism in West Virginia. The website "West Virginia Explorer" reported an increase of fifteen times the visitors to the site in the days after the announcement, while management of the Camden Park amusement park said there was an increase in people looking to purchase park merchandise.

The teaser trailer shown at E3 2018 featured a cover version of John Denver's song "Take Me Home, Country Roads". Fans of the series expressed interest in the song, prompting Bethesda to announce plans to release the song on digital musical services, with all proceeds from it being donated to Habitat for Humanity, assuring a minimum US$100,000 donation. In Australia, a free Fallout 76 vinyl containing the cover of "Take Me Home, Country Roads" was included as a promotion with the December 2018 issue of Stack magazine, available at retailer JB Hi-Fi.

=== Post-release ===
Beyond the launch of Fallout 76, the game continued to receive further development support from Bethesda to improve or alter its design, combat technical issues, and take action against users seen as cheating. However, many of the decisions undertaken by the publisher to implement these aims garnered disgruntlement and criticism from players and gaming outlets.

In December 2018, the prices of Fallout 76's in-game cosmetics received increasingly negative attention from players for being too expensive, particularly in regards to items added for the 2018 holiday season. Eurogamer noted how a set of Santa Claus outfits and a large sign cost $20 and $14 worth of in-game currency (called Atoms), respectively, with players arguing similar pricing was enough to buy Fallout 4's season pass with all add-ons. In the spring and summer of 2019, the game introduced items that managed a player's surplus inventory and improved the quality of their weapons, both of which could be acquired through spending Atoms. However, the implementation drew criticism from players, who felt that it favored those that paid for Atoms with real-world money instead of gaining them through hours of playtime. Additional items released later that provided gameplay advantages and were buyable with Atoms drew similar criticism. Polygon wrote the in-game store had "slowly warped over time", particularly as it had initially only offered cosmetic items for sale.

In the weeks following release, Bethesda banned numerous players from the game for using mods and exploiting technical issues for various purposes. Such examples included duplicating in-game items, and gaining access to the game's developer room, an off-limits area created for testing purposes which contained copies of every item. Many of these players found that their accounts had been closed without warning, and were emailed by Bethesda asking them to write an essay explaining why cheating and using mod software was damaging to online video games. Bethesda's reaction received backlash from users as many felt they had been unfairly targeted for using mods to fix graphical or technical issues with the game, rather than with the intention to gain unfair advantages.

Fallout 76's in-game currency became affected by hackers due to the mass duplication of items, much of which were sold using unofficial methods outside of the game. Various players took it upon themselves to combat item duplication by hunting down and killing any player-characters suspected of using them, despite a number being in fact innocent. Other examples of hacking were achieved in Fallout 76; for example, in December 2019 alone, users succeeded in incorporating numerous NPCs and objects into the game, some of which had been taken from Fallout 4. Later that same month, hackers managed to open other online players' inventories and steal hundreds of their items. While Bethesda took action to combat these, many users called on the publisher to implement more rigorous anti-cheat protection for the game and to be more forceful in banning the accounts of those caught hacking.

On September 15, 2026, native versions for PlayStation 5 and Xbox Series X/S were released.

==== Fallout 1st ====
On October 23, 2019, Bethesda announced it would be selling a premium subscription service for Fallout 76, titled Fallout 1st, priced at $12.99 per month or $99.99 per year. The subscription allows payees to play the game in a private online server (either alone or in a group of up to seven people, who do not have to be subscribers). It also introduces new content such as a box allowing unlimited storage for crafting materials, a placeable fast travel system with supplementary supplies, 1650 atoms per month, and exclusive cosmetic items. The choice to release a subscription model for the game drew criticism and was considered an audacious move from Bethesda, particularly as content like private worlds had been requested before the game's launch by players but was instead now included behind a paywall. Some noted that subscription services for exclusive content in full-priced games were being shunned in favor of other models. Kotaku contested the high price, writing how the base game, while having improved in time through new content following its poor launch, still suffered from various problems, and additionally was continuing to be sold for a discounted price at most retailers.

== Reception ==
=== Critical response ===
Reception

Aggregate score
Aggregator	Score
Metacritic	PC: 52/100; PS4: 53/100; XONE: 49/100

Review scores
Publication	Score
Eurogamer	Avoid
Game Informer	6/10
GameSpot	4/10
GamesRadar+	2.5/5
IGN	5/10 (original); 7/10 (re-review)
PC Gamer (US)	60/100
PCGamesN	5/10
The Guardian	2/5
USgamer	2/5
VideoGamer.com	4/10

Edit on Wikidata

According to review aggregator Metacritic, the PC and PlayStation 4 versions received "mixed or average" reviews, while the Xbox One version received "generally unfavorable" reviews.

The Guardian called the game "a pointless walk in the post-apocalypse" featuring "half-baked conflict and witless quests to unearth the dead". Eurogamer described the game as a "bizarre, boring, broken mess", adding that, shortly after its launch, it should be considered as a "failed experiment". Business Insider described Fallout 76 as "a jumble of disparate video game elements set loose in an online world, held together by a string of pointless fetch quests and experience points". Newsweek said that moments of the enjoyment during their review were "outweighed by the near-constant performance issues and poorly executed game systems", adding that they were disappointed in the game despite being fans of the series.

PCWorld ended their review early due to their frustration with the game's technical performance, and said that it still would not be a great game to them even if it "functioned properly". GameSpot said that the game "can look and feel like its illustrious predecessors at times, but it's a soulless husk of an experience." According to IGN, "The rich wasteland map of Fallout 76 is wasted on a mess of bugs, conflicting ideas, and monotony." Giant Bomb has said they will not publish a full review due to lack of interest of the staff to play it enough to reach a final verdict. Editor and co-founder Jeff Gerstmann stated on their podcast "No one on staff wants to play any more of this video game."

The game was also criticized for its initial absence of interactive human NPCs. GameSpot said that "without having any of those people present to tell their stories personally, [Fallout 76]'s world is limited to being little more than just an environmental exhibit with things to kill", and that "there are no strong emotional anchors to help you become truly invested...". They also wrote that quests simply exist of "long monologues and one-way directives from a person who no longer exists and you can't interact with ... your actions ultimately won't affect anyone, or the rest of the world for that matter". PC World similarly took issue, writing "robots aren't really NPCs as much as quest dispensers ... they don't talk with you, they talk at you". Additionally, they disliked the readable terminals and holotapes: "none of it feels important or even particularly interesting" as they were "no substitute for an actual conversation".

Many reviewers noted a large number of bugs and glitches present in Fallout 76, affecting numerous aspects of the game, as well as stability, performance and graphical issues. In response, Bethesda issued several patches, the size of the first being 50GB, which nearly eclipsed the size of the game itself. However, many of the attempted fixes garnered player disgruntlement for failing to resolve some of the more notable technical issues, removing features previously thought intentional, and inadvertently resulting in further bugs, some of which had been fixed previously. A number of fans subsequently expressed their desire for Bethesda to use a public test server for new patches before their release. The game's controversial subscription service also received further negative attention upon its launch in October 2019 due to a range of issues. In particular, players reported that private servers used to present a newly created version of the game's world contained dead NPCs and looted areas, implying that the servers were recycled instances that people had already used. Additionally, players found that they were not able to go "invisible" and restrict their private server to a few select friends; instead, anyone on their friends list could see and join the server. Another technical issue with the subscription model concerned a box that allowed for an unlimited depositing of crafting materials, with players storing their items accordingly and then returning later to find that the contents of the box had disappeared.

On December 22, 2018, as a way of apology for the criticism surrounding Fallout 76, Bethesda announced that they would give all players of Fallout 76 a free copy of the Fallout Classic Collection, available on PC, which consists of Fallout, Fallout 2, and Fallout Tactics: Brotherhood of Steel. In an interview with IGN on June 2, 2019, Todd Howard addressed the launch of Fallout 76 and that the negative reactions had been anticipated by Bethesda, saying, "We knew we were going to have a lot of bumps. That's a difficult development; a lot of new systems and things like that ... a lot of those difficulties ended up on the screen. We knew, hey look, this is not the type of game that people are used to from us and we're going to get some criticism on it. A lot of that—very well-deserved criticism ... This is not gonna be a high Metacritic game. This is not what this is." Howard also expressed regret at not releasing a beta version of the game several months before release to gain feedback. Despite this, he believed that Fallout 76's reception would improve over time from ongoing support, and that this mattered more for a game than how it started out: "It's not how you launch, it's what it becomes ... It's [Fallout 76] really turned around. It's a fabulous game with an incredible community."

==== Wastelanders ====
With the release of the Wastelanders expansion, the game saw improved reception from critics. On Metacritic, the Wastelanders expansion had an aggregate score of 68/100 for Windows, and 63/100 for PlayStation 4 based on updated reviews. IGN David Jagneaux's review of Wastelanders scored the update a 6 of 10, but stated that Wastelanders "is a dramatic overhaul of Appalachia from top to bottom it desperately needed. It finally introduces mostly interesting human NPCs, an abundance of fun new quests, and satisfying alterations to existing areas. As a result, Fallout 76 is starting to feel like a true Fallout game – even if it's still not as consistently enjoyable as its predecessors." PCWorld said "It's still not as good as a proper offline Fallout sequel, but Fallout 76's Wastelanders expansion injects some much-needed personality into post-apocalyptic West Virginia." GameSpot wrote that "Wastelanders introduces some of the best Fallout sequences in recent years, but you'll have to dig through a lot of Fallout 76's enduring issues to experience them." Nate Crowley of Rock, Paper, Shotgun said of the improvements, "The mood of the game, for want of a better word, is transformed: what was once hollow now feels fleshed out, and what was lifeless now feels at least intermittently busy. I've still got a lot of issues with Fallout 76, but they're starting to feel fixable, or at least easier to overlook."

When the game, with the new Wastelanders expansion, was released on Steam in April 2020, it was initially review bombed by users generally upset over the game's original state when it was first released. However, other users on Steam and other community sites have worked to try to counter that perception of the game to newer players or interested buyers, pointing out that, like Final Fantasy XIV: A Realm Reborn and No Man's Sky, the updates since launch, particularly with the Wastelanders update included with the Steam release, had significantly improved the game, and that those interested in trying it should ignore the negative reviews.

=== Sales ===
Upon launch, Fallout 76 debuted at third place in the UK's all-format sales charts, behind Spyro Reignited Trilogy and Red Dead Redemption 2, and fifth place in the Switzerland all-format sales charts. According to the NPD Group, the game had lower launch sales than either Fallout 4 or Fallout: New Vegas. In their respective opening months, the game's physical sales were less than one fifth of Fallout 4 (down 82%). In Japan, the PlayStation 4 version sold 73,489 copies within its debut week, which made it the second bestselling retail game of the week in the country.

SuperData estimated that, as of the end of 2018, Fallout 76 had sold 1.4 million digital copies. In November 2021, Todd Howard revealed the game had 11 million players in total. In March 2024, the game had 17 million players. The following month, following the release of the Amazon Prime Fallout television series, Fallout 76's player count reached an all-time high six years after its release, with a million people logging in within a single day.

=== Accolades ===
Despite the mixed reviews, the game was nominated for "Fan Favorite Fall Release" at the Gamers' Choice Awards, for "Game of the Year" at the Australian Games Awards, and for the Tin Pan Alley Award for Best Music in a Game at the New York Game Awards. The game won the "Best Video Game TV Spot" award at the 2019 Golden Trailer Awards.

== Controversies ==
Fallout 76's Power Armor special edition drew controversy upon release. Bethesda advertised that the edition would include a canvas duffel bag, but a nylon one was included instead. Responding to customer complaints, Bethesda claimed that the bag had to be changed due to unavailability of materials, and initially stated the intention to take no action. The publisher received criticism for not making the change known beforehand, with Eurogamer pointing out that the bag's description on Bethesda's website had only changed to read "nylon" after complaints had been submitted. Bethesda later offered affected customers free in-game currency of 500 atoms as compensation, equivalent to US$5.00 (equivalent to $6.41 in 2025). Critics pointed out this amount of currency was not enough to purchase the in-game postman uniform (700 atoms), which includes a canvas bag. Additionally, it was discovered that Bethesda had produced a different Fallout 76–themed canvas bag and given them for free to online influencers, further adding to the fan outrage. Bethesda announced on December 3, 2018, that they would be producing canvas bags for all owners of the Power Armor special edition, In June 2019, the bags were delivered to customers.

A data breach occurred on December 5, 2018, when a glitch in Bethesda's support system revealed personal information of approximately 65 Fallout 76 customers who had submitted a support ticket to receive the canvas bag. Users were able to open and close tickets of other customers and view personal information, including names, addresses, emails and partial credit card information. In a statement given to Ars Technica, Bethesda said that the breach occurred via "an error with our customer support website" and that they are "investigating the incident and will provide additional updates as we learn more". The publisher clarified that the only information leaked were details that the support site would have requested, rather than credit card numbers or passwords, and that they would notify all affected customers.

In 2018, Bethesda partnered with the Silver Screen Bottling Company to create "Nuka Dark Rum", an alcoholic beverage based on the in-game "Nuka-Cola Dark" introduced in the Fallout 4: Nuka-World add-on. The rum was available to be pre-ordered in August 2018 for $80 (equivalent to $102.57 in 2025). While its release was expected to coincide with the launch of Fallout 76, the rum was delayed and was shipped instead in late December 2018. Upon receiving it, fans criticized the fact that the rum bottle advertised, expected to be in the missile-like shape of the Nuka-Cola item, had turned out to be a standard glass bottle encased in a plastic cover. The rum's asking price of $80 was subsequently condemned from expectations that the design would be of high quality, since none of the marketing had stated what the bottles would be made of.

In September 2019, collectible "Nuka Cola"–themed Fallout helmets produced by Chronicle Collectibles, of which only 32 of the 20,000 manufactured were sold, were recalled by the U.S. Consumer Product Safety Commission due to containing high levels of mold and posing a health risk. No incidents or injuries were reported. GameStop, which sold the helmets, notified all customers who had purchased a helmet and offered them a full refund.
