= Fallout 4: Far Harbor =

Expansion pack for the 2015 video game Fallout 4

- Platform: Microsoft Windows
- Release: May 19, 2016
- Genres: Action role-playing, Survival
- Mode: Single-player

Fallout 4: Far Harbor is an expansion pack for the 2015 video game Fallout 4, developed by Bethesda Game Studios and published by Bethesda Softworks. Far Harbor was released on May 19, 2016 for PlayStation 4, Windows, and Xbox One Nintendo Switch 2 as downloadable content (DLC). The game is set in the year 2287, in the aftermath of a nuclear war that destroys most of the United States. In the expansion, the player character is hired as a private investigator to search for a missing girl in the isolated seaside community of Far Harbor.

The game can be played in first-person or third-person perspective; in either case, the player controls the protagonist throughout their investigation on The Island, a landmass off the coast of Maine. Far Harbor's main gameplay consists of quests and puzzle sections. Upon completing the quests in the game, the player is rewarded with bottle caps from Nuka-Cola bottles (the franchise's main fictional currency), and experience points. The puzzles feature a variety of different game mechanics; some require the player to hit targets with lasers, and others allow building using blocks.

Announced in February 2016, the expansion was influenced by player feedback regarding the base game's dialogue system, which was not considered to be as successful as the other game mechanics. The development team also noticed the players' interest in releases that added large amounts of explorable territory. The price of Fallout 4's season pass was increased because of the expansion's size.

Far Harbor received generally positive reviews from critics. The addition of new quests was praised, but there were mixed opinions on the expansion's atmosphere and its use of fog. The main criticisms were directed at the puzzles, which reviewers thought were a waste of time, unnecessary, or overly frustrating. In July 2016, Guillaume Veer accused Bethesda of copying his Fallout: New Vegas mod, named Autumn Leaves, though Veer said that he was not upset even if Bethesda had deliberately incorporated material from Autumn Leaves in Far Harbor.

== Gameplay ==
Fallout 4: Far Harbor is an expansion pack for the action role-playing game, Fallout 4, the fourth installment in the Fallout series. It is set 210 years after "The Great War", which resulted in nuclear devastation across the United States. The expansion is similar to the base game in that the player character (the "Sole Survivor") is tasked with investigating a character's disappearance. In the base game, the player is searching for their lost son, while in the expansion, the player is recruited by the Valentine Detective Agency to investigate the disappearance of a young girl named Kasumi. Both the base game and the expansion pack offer the ability to swap between first-person and third-person perspectives. The expansion is set on a radioactive, fog-smothered island, and is located in Fallout's version of Bar Harbor, a town in Hancock County, Maine. Far Harbor features three factions which include both violent and peaceful non-player characters.

Far Harbor is set on a foggy island. As in Fallout 4, the player character can use power armor, as indicated by the HUD.

The expansion contains quests and puzzles that the player must solve. There are different ways to complete quests, all with their own pitfalls. Peaceful resolutions can be made with characters and factions, though these can have ill effects, such as unveiling secrets or worsening relations with other factions. Violent completion of quests may be faster, though they can result in the weakening of alliances between the player and the factions. In some of the puzzle sections, the player directs lasers to hit designated targets; others require the player to build with blocks, as in Minecraft. Puzzle sections were not featured in the base game. Upon completion of quests, the assisted factions reward the protagonist with Nuka-Cola bottle caps, one of the fictional currencies found throughout the Fallout series. The player character also gains experience points. Some of the quests include investigating minor mysteries, retrieving missing items, solving disagreements, and clearing out monster-infested areas.

One of the gameplay mechanics which carried over from the previous iterations is V.A.T.S. (Vault-Tec Assisted Targeting System). While using V.A.T.S., real-time combat is slowed, allowing the player to choose where to shoot the enemy: shooting enemies in the head will typically result in death while shooting their legs can slow them. Weapons can also be shot at to disarm the enemy. Using V.A.T.S. lowers the player's stamina (Action Points, or AP). Some actions are unavailable to the player if their stamina is insufficient, in which case the player has to wait for their AP to regenerate. The use of power armor in combat increases the rate at which the player's AP are used. The Pip-Boy, a small computer strapped to the character's wrist, also plays a role in both Fallout 4 and Far Harbor. It contains a menu which the player can access to view maps, statistics, data, and items, and when the player is able to visit Far Harbor, the Pip-Boy will receive a signal from Valentine's Detective Agency.

== Synopsis ==
=== Setting and characters ===
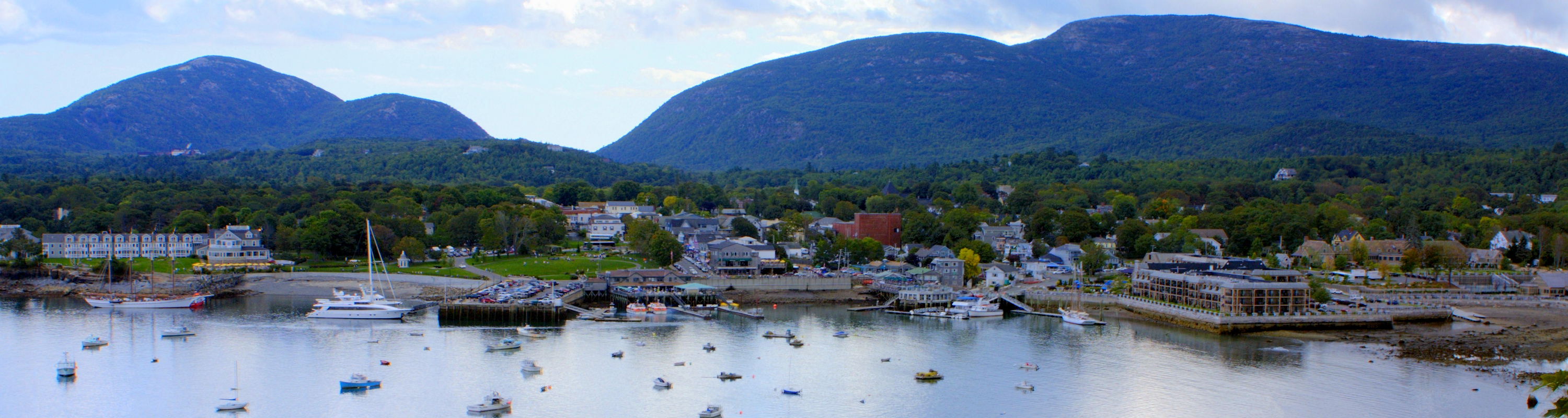
Far Harbor's fictional setting is based on Bar Harbor, a town in Maine.

The expansion is set on a post-apocalyptic version of Mount Desert Island, known in-game as simply the Island and located north-east of the Commonwealth, Fallout's post-apocalyptic version of the Boston, Massachusetts metropolitan area. The starting point is the former town of Bar Harbor, now called Far Harbor. The Island, where many unique creatures reside, is blanketed by radioactive fog. Because the creatures that live inside the fog are unwilling to go anywhere without it, the town uses devices called fog condensers to turn the fog into liquid in order to protect its inhabitants.

There are three major conflicting factions present in the expansion, all residing in separate areas: the Harbormen of Far Harbor; the synth (synthetic human) colony of Acadia; and the Church of the Children of Atom. The Harbormen of Far Harbor are led by the town leader, Captain Avery, and seek to reclaim the Island from the fog that has gradually driven them out of their homes. The Children of Atom live in an old nuclear submarine base called the Nucleus and are led by High Confessor Tektus. Tektus is a fanatical follower of the Church of Atom who seeks to disable or destroy the fog condensers. The synth colony of Acadia is within an abandoned observatory; the group are led by a mysterious prototype synth called DiMA. DiMA is friendly to both the Harbormen and the Children so long as Acadia remains autonomous and isolated from the rest of the world.

=== Plot ===
Valentine's Detective Agency receives a request for help from Kenji and Rei Nakano, a husband and wife living in a remote corner of the Commonwealth; their daughter, Kasumi, has vanished without a trace or explanation. The Sole Survivor is sent to investigate, discovers Kasumi had been in contact with Acadia and borrows Kenji's boat to follow her.

Arriving in the town of Far Harbor, the Sole Survivor finds the Island locked in a tense stalemate between the local residents and the Children of Atom. With the aid of a local hunter and one of the Harbormen named Old Longfellow, the Sole Survivor finds Kasumi living in Acadia. Kasumi has come to believe that she is a synth, and has sought refuge there, even though she has started to doubt the intentions of DiMA. At Kasumi's behest, the Sole Survivor switches focus to investigating DiMA, and gradually learns he has consciously chosen to store some of his memories on hard drives outside of his body. He has hidden them inside a computer simulation in the Children of Atom's base, the Nucleus, but has grown increasingly concerned that if the Children access the memories, they will have the means to destroy Far Harbor.

The Sole Survivor approaches the Children of Atom to recover DiMA's memories and learns that he put in place a series of fail-safes to protect Acadia, and to preserve the balance of power between Far Harbor and the Children of Atom. These are the access codes to a nuclear warhead, stored within the Nucleus, and the means to sabotage the fog condensers protecting Far Harbor. The Sole Survivor also discovers that DiMA murdered Captain Avery and replaced her with a synth to maintain peace between Far Harbor and Acadia.

==== Endings ====
There are eight possible endings. The Sole Survivor is faced with a choice: to destroy Far Harbor, to destroy the Children of Atom, or to inform the people of Far Harbor of DiMA's crime and trigger a feud between the Harbormen and Acadia.

Should the player choose to detonate the warhead, the Harbormen will take control of the Island, while if the player destroys the fog condensers, the Children will become dominant. In both scenarios Acadia will be spared, though DiMA will disapprove of the player's actions. Alternatively, if the player confronts DiMA over Avery's murder, Acadia may become hostile.

The Sole Survivor is able to establish a more permanent peace between all parties by assassinating or chasing away High Confessor Tektus, and allowing DiMA to replace him with a synth who will adopt a more moderate stance towards the Harbormen.

Additionally, the Sole Survivor can choose to make the main game's factions aware of Acadia's existence. The Institute, a scientific organization that made the synths, will send agents to reclaim them, while the Brotherhood of Steel, a quasi-religious organization rooted in the United States Armed Forces, will launch an expedition to exterminate them. The Railroad, a group dedicated towards freeing the Institute's sentient synths, will send an operative to make contact with Acadia, though the latter will reject their help.

In the aftermath, the Sole Survivor returns to the Nakano family back in the Commonwealth. Kasumi, depending on the player's choices, may return with the player character or stay in Acadia.

== Development and release ==
"Then we have an opportunity with something like Far Harbor. Like: okay, how many different ways can it end—let's give them some more choice. So it's not just a one-off, meaning Fallout 4 comes out and then we forget about it—it's an ongoing thing. The feedback we get is really, really helpful."

— Todd Howard, Bethesda director

Far Harbor was developed by Bethesda Game Studios and was announced three months after the official release of Fallout 4—alongside Automatron, Wasteland Workshop, and teasers of other upcoming expansions—in a blog post on February 16, 2016. The expansion was released on May 19, for PlayStation 4, Windows, and Xbox One. Of the first three expansions, Far Harbor added the largest landmass, and was consequently sold at a higher price. It also added new dungeons (self-contained quest locations), quests, creatures, and other miscellaneous features. The expansion was included in the Fallout 4 season pass, a collection of all the expansion packs. Because of the large amount of additional content, the price for the pass was increased from US$30 to $50.

The expansion was influenced by feedback from players regarding the dialogue system in Fallout 4, which "didn't work as well as other features". The dialogue system in Fallout games allows the players to converse with and influence the non-player characters. The dialogue options in Far Harbor were designed to give players more flexibility in bringing the game to an end, with the expansion featuring more dialogue choices. The development team also found players were interested in visiting new locations, adding inspiration to Far Harbor albeit at increased development cost and time to completion.

Two weeks after the expansion's official release, the PlayStation 4 version was re-released to fix performance issues. In a performance analysis by Eurogamer's Digital Foundry, it was discovered that although Fallout 4 typically ran at 30 frames per second (fps), when the player was outside and, in Far Harbor's foggy biomes, the frame rate could drop to 15 fps, and could drop even lower during action-oriented events such as firefights. In the same analysis, the Xbox One version was found to run at 20–30 fps but experienced various issues, such as stuttering and software lock-ups. The update toned down the level of fog, and was successful in making the game more stable.

== Reception ==
Fallout 4: Far Harbor

Aggregate score
Aggregator	Score
Metacritic	PC: 79/100; PS4: 75/100; XONE: 78/100

Review scores
Publication	Score
Destructoid	PS4: 5/10
GameRevolution	XONE: 4.5/5
GameSpot	6/10
IGN	PC: 8.3/10; PS4: 7.7/10; XONE: 8.5/10
PC Gamer (US)	PC: 80/100
VideoGamer.com	PS4: 8/10
Metro (GameCentral)	PS4: 7/10

Edit on Wikidata

Fallout 4: Far Harbor was released to "generally favorable" reviews, according to the review aggregator Metacritic. The new quests drew praise from reviewers, though the puzzle sections were criticized. In particular, Dan Stapleton (IGN) expressed admiration for the new quests but said that the puzzle rooms were "so hard to fail I'm not sure why Bethesda bothered". He also mentioned that the Far Harbor expansion contained some of the strongest quest content in Fallout 4. Peter Brown (GameSpot) commended the addition of "hours of side quests driven by curious characters", and the staff at Game Central agreed. Matt Wittaker (Hardcore Gamer) appreciated the quests: he praised the main questline for its focus on "moral ambiguity and tough choices", saying that that was what Fallout fans were seeking. The reviewers for Game Revolution and GameCentral disliked the puzzles, as did Jack de Quidt (Rock, Paper, Shotgun) who regarded AI pathfinding within puzzle segments as very frustrating even though he felt they were "a small part of the release". Both de Quidt and the Game Revolution reviewer considered the engine insufficient for the intricate puzzle sequences. Several reviewers made comparisons to the video game Minecraft when talking about the block-related content added in the expansion.

Reviewers had varying opinions on the atmosphere and the fog. Stapleton commended the majority of the content except the fog, which he felt became annoying after a time, but Matt Wittaker thought the fog was not much of a nuisance if the player's character was built to mitigate radiation. David Ambrosini (IGN) and Christopher Livingston (PC Gamer) both praised the atmosphere; with Livingston saying "you can literally taste [it]". Reviewers were also divided over the storyline, with the writers for Game Revolution admiring the story and new characters, while Peter Brown found them uninteresting.

Some reviewers did not like the expansion's repetitiveness, and Nic Rowen (Destructoid) was disappointed with the lack of uniqueness in the release. Chad Sapieha (Post Arcade) said that he was growing weary of the repetitive small tasks like managing loot, and traveling between settlements just to dispose of it; he added that he was done with Fallout 4 and its DLC and was prepared to move onto a further installment. David Soriano (IGN) commended the extensive size of the map but felt it was somewhat wasted. Alice Bell (VideoGamer.com) and the reviewers at GameCentral praised the value for money: Bell said that Far Harbor was the best of the first three expansion packs for getting "the most bang for your buck", even taking into account the design flaws.

=== Similarities with Autumn Leaves ===
Screenshots (top is of Autumn Leaves, bottom is of Far Harbor) used by Guillaume Veer to show the similarities he noticed between the two releases

In July 2016, Mod DB user Guillaume Veer, going by the online alias of BaronVonChateau, accused Bethesda of copying one of his Fallout: New Vegas mods, named Autumn Leaves. Comparing the plot of Autumn Leaves and one of Far Harbor's quests called Brain Dead, Veer described both as having “a colorful cast of eccentric robots, in charge of a forgotten Vault where a strange murder happened". Pete Hines, the vice president of Bethesda's marketing team, claimed that any similarities were completely coincidental.

Other similarities were discussed in an article by Mat Paget (GameSpot), such as the fact that both Far Harbor and Autumn Leaves feature the ability to use the character's voice to determine whether they are a robot. Veer noted that he was not upset with the similarities, saying that he takes inspiration from other games too: "I seriously think this is perfectly okay. After all, Autumn Leaves' inspirations are countless ... and being influenced is a natural part of the writing process." Veer said that having the names of modders in the game's credits for acknowledgement would be beneficial. He also said that he was comfortable even if Bethesda did deliberately use content from Autumn Leaves, and wrote that "I honestly thought Bethesda’s staff played Autumn Leaves, had a blast with it, took some things out of it and made their own thing for Far Harbor. ... And I seriously think this is perfectly okay."
