= Fallout 4 downloadable content =

Downloadable content for 2015 video game

- Release: Automatron; March 22, 2016; Wasteland Workshop; April 12, 2016; Far Harbor; May 19, 2016; Contraptions Workshop; June 21, 2016; Vault-Tec Workshop; July 26, 2016; Nuka-World; August 30, 2016

There are six pieces of downloadable content (DLC) for Bethesda Game Studios' action role-playing video game Fallout 4. Released once a month from March to August 2016, each expansion pack adds a variety of different content, with Far Harbor being the largest in terms of additional gameplay and Nuka-World being the largest in terms of file size. The season pass contains all six expansion packs, and due to the size of Far Harbor, the price was increased after its release.

All of the expansion packs were released for PlayStation 4, Windows, and Xbox One. In order of release, the expansions packs are Automatron, Wasteland Workshop, Far Harbor, Contraptions Workshop, Vault-Tec Workshop and Nuka-World.

== Automatron ==
Automatron was announced, along with Wasteland Workshop, Far Harbor and teases of other expansion packs, on the Bethesda Game Studios' blog on February 16, 2016. It is the first expansion pack and was released on March 22, 2016. It consists of a series of quests that unlock the ability to build and customize robots at the player's settlements.

=== Plot ===
The Sole Survivor intercepts a distress call from a trading caravan outside Cambridge, but arrives too late to save them from a horde of robots. After repelling the attack, the Sole Survivor meets Ada, a customized robot who had been travelling with the caravan. Lamenting her inability to save her owners, Ada agrees to join the Sole Survivor in the hopes of getting revenge and thwarting the wider threat posed by the Mechanist, the person assembling robots which have been attacking settlers and caravans across the Commonwealth.

In order to locate the Mechanist, the Sole Survivor needs to triangulate the signal being sent to RoboBrains—a model of robot with a human brain as a central processing unit—the units controlling each individual cell of robots. After recovering the receiver devices from two RoboBrains overseeing scavenging operations, the Sole Survivor confronts the Rust Devils, a gang of raiders notorious for stripping robots for parts, in order to recover the third transponder. The Sole Survivor meets Jezebel, a RoboBrain unit held captive by the Rust Devils, and she agrees to help in exchange for building her a new body when they escape.

Jezebel provides the Sole Survivor with the final transponder needed to locate the Mechanist, and a device that will allow Ada to open locked doors within the Mechanist's hideout. Before the Sole Survivor departs, Jezebel reveals that her mission was to save the people of the Commonwealth. Calculating that their odds of survival decreased without her presence, she decided that killing people was more humane as she could not always be present to save them.

The Sole Survivor follows the Mechanist's signal to a robotics retailer and service center that was the cover for a secret military installation prior to the Great War. The facility was used to create RoboBrains, conditioning condemned prisoners and asylum inmates to have their brains removed, preserved and installed in robotic bodies; the trauma of the process accounts for the RoboBrains' difficult personalities.

After fighting off waves of robots, the Sole Survivor confronts the Mechanist, who claims to be saving the Commonwealth. However, the Sole Survivor convinces her that the RoboBrains misinterpreted their orders and started killing innocent people. Horrified, the Mechanist reveals herself to be Isabel Cruz, a young woman with an affinity for making robots and trouble relating to people who was inspired to create the Mechanist persona after finding a child's drawings of a robot-themed superhero in the remains of a caravan that had been attacked by raiders. Devastated that her good intentions led to the deaths of innocents, Isabel retires from being the Mechanist and offers to help the Sole Survivor track down and destroy the rogue robots terrorizing the Commonwealth.

=== Reception ===
Fallout 4: Automatron

Aggregate score
| Aggregator | Score |
|---|---|
| Metacritic | PC: 67/100; PS4: 69/100; XBO: 74/100 |

Automatron received "mixed or average" reviews from critics, according to review aggregator Metacritic.

Kat Bailey from USgamer believed Automatron was one of the two essential expansion packs for Fallout 4.

== Wasteland Workshop ==
Wasteland Workshop is the second expansion pack and was released worldwide on April 12, 2016. The release date for the PlayStation 4 and Xbox versions was also April 12 everywhere except Asia, where those versions were released on April 19. This pack does not contain any quests, but consists of a large number of new objects which can be constructed in settlement building mode. This includes new concrete structures, cages designed to capture creatures ranging from cats to deathclaws (including Raiders; human enemies) and various pieces useful for setting up gladiatorial combat arenas.

=== Reception ===
IGN's Jared Petty gave a negative review of the PC version which they described as offering "piecemeal additions", with some aspects being "briefly enjoyable" but not "fully fleshed out". It was given a score of 5.5/10.

== Far Harbor ==
Far Harbor is the third expansion pack and was released on May 19, 2016.

=== Plot ===
Valentine's Detective Agency receives a request for help from the Nakano family, who live in a remote corner of the Commonwealth. Their daughter, Kasumi, has vanished without a trace or explanation, and the Sole Survivor is enlisted to investigate. They discover that Kasumi had been in contact with Acadia, a colony of escaped synths living on an island in Maine.

With the aid of a local hunter named Old Longfellow, the Sole Survivor finds Kasumi living in Acadia. At Kasumi's behest, the player switches focus to investigating the synth DiMA, leader of Acadia, and learns that he has stored some of his memories outside his body. He has hidden them inside a computer simulation in the Children of Atom's base of Operations, the Nucleus, but has grown concerned that if the Children access the memories, they will have the means to destroy Far Harbor.

The Sole Survivor travels to a former submarine base to recover DiMA's memories and learns that he put in place a series of fail-safes to protect Acadia and to preserve the balance of power between Far Harbor and a cult of the Children of Atom who have occupied the base. These are the access codes to a nuclear warhead, stored within the Nucleus, and the means to sabotage the fog condensers protecting Far Harbor. The Sole Survivor also discovers that DiMA murdered Captain Avery and replaced her with a synth to maintain peace between Far Harbor and Acadia. At this point, the player is faced with a choice: to destroy Far Harbor, to destroy the Children of Atom, inform the people of Far Harbor of DiMA's crime and start a war with Acadia, or, depending on the story's progress back at the Commonwealth, inform any of the three main Factions there and let them decide their fate themselves. Alternatively, the player may establish a more permanent peace between all parties by assassinating or chasing away High Confessor Tektus, and allowing DiMA to replace him with a synth who will adopt a more moderate stance towards Far Harbor.

In the aftermath, the Sole Survivor returns to the Nakano family back at the Commonwealth, with or without Kasumi.

=== Reception ===
Fallout 4: Far Harbor

Aggregate score
| Aggregator | Score |
|---|---|
| Metacritic | PC: 79/100; PS4: 75/100; XBO: 78/100 |

Fallout 4: Far Harbor received "generally favorable" reviews from critics, according to review aggregator Metacritic.

Kat Bailey from USgamer believed Far Harbor was one of the two essential expansion packs for Fallout 4.

== Contraptions Workshop ==
Contraptions Workshop is the fourth expansion pack and was released on June 21, 2016. Like the Wasteland Workshop, the Contraptions Workshop adds objects to the game's build mode—rather than story content—including prefabricated building models, manufactories that can produce equipment and items for the player, and items that the player can use to create elaborate Rube Goldberg-style machines.

== Vault-Tec Workshop ==
Vault-Tec Workshop, released on July 26, 2016, is the fifth expansion pack. It focuses on designing and constructing a Vault, as opposed to the prior workshop-based expansion packs that simply added settlement components. As part of a quest in this expansion pack, the Sole Survivor finds Vault 88, an empty Vault that allows for customization. By incorporating elements similar to the mobile game Fallout Shelter, the expansion pack allows for the Sole Survivor to build and freely explore their own interconnected Vault rooms.

=== Plot ===
The Sole Survivor picks up a distress signal from Vault 88, an unfinished fallout shelter located outside Quincy. Raider activity in the area has triggered the Vault's distress beacon, forcing the Sole Survivor to fight them off to gain entry. Once inside, the Sole Survivor meets Barstow, a ghoul who was originally intended to be the Vault 88 Overseer, but was sealed inside the unfinished Vault when the Great War started.

Undeterred, Barstow intends to see Vault 88 complete its planned social experiment, and enlists the Sole Survivor in achieving her vision. After restoring power and broadcasting a signal, Vault 88 begins to receive settlers. Barstow and the Sole Survivor search for potential human guinea pigs in the population and find one in Clem, a naïve and enthusiastic—but nevertheless well-meaning—young man. Through Clem, Barstow and the Sole Survivor plan to conduct a series of experiments on the population.

Barstow reveals that Vault 88's original purpose was to test a series of devices designed to minimize "social waste", or turn unproductive residents into contributing members of society. These include an exercise bike that provides power; a drinks station that can be spiked with a variety of drugs; and a device for examining eyes that can be used to read a person's thoughts. Each experiment has an additional set of parameters that can be chosen by the Sole Survivor.

Upon the successful conclusion of the final experiment, Barstow confides to the Sole Survivor her ambitions of contributing to the Vault program with her own invention, a slot machine that can be used to identify deviant behavior in the population. After realizing this dream, she appoints the Sole Survivor as Overseer, intending to visit other Vaults with the results of their experiments. The Sole Survivor is skeptical, pointing out that many Vaults did not survive and that Vault-Tec no longer exists. However, Barstow counters that Vault-Tec should not be underestimated, implying that some part of the company survived and that the original Vault program was much larger than originally believed.

=== Reception ===
Brian Albert of IGN said the additional quests did not stand up on their own but the package was "settlement builder’s dream, through and through." They rated the title 8.2/10.

== Nuka-World ==
Nuka-World is the sixth and final paid expansion pack and was released on August 30, 2016.

=== Plot ===
Nuka-World begins with the Sole Survivor picking up a radio broadcast and heading to the Nuka World Transit Station, in which they find a still functional monorail to Nuka World, a pre-war amusement park. Taking the train to the park, the Sole Survivor finds themselves trapped in a test called The Gauntlet, a series of traps and dangers intended to stop all but the strongest from entering Nuka World. After reaching the end of the Gauntlet, Gage, a raider occupying the park, contacts the Sole Survivor and proposes a deal to defeat current Overboss, Colter. Colter is highly unpopular amongst the raider gangs who occupy Nuka World - The Operators, The Disciples and The Pack. Facing off against each other in the Arena, Colter is killed and the Sole Survivor becomes the new Overboss. Now in command of the area, the Sole Survivor must decide on either siding with the raiders and retaking the other park areas and spreading their influence into the Commonwealth, or instead turning against the raiders and restoring Nuka World by themselves.

=== Reception ===
Dan Stapleton of IGN said the DLC had "a great setting that's densely packed with spectacle" but had a lack of meaningful decisions in comparison to Far Harbor. It was rated 7.9/10.

== Fallout 4 High Resolution Texture Pack ==
Fallout 4 High Resolution Texture Pack is the seventh and final DLC for Fallout 4. It covers most of the textures in-game, increasing their visual fidelity.

The DLC was released for free on February 6, 2017, exclusively for PC.
