= Fallout 4: Nuka-World =

2016 video game

- Platform: Microsoft Windows
- Release: August 30, 2016
- Genres: Action role-playing, survival
- Mode: Single-player

Fallout 4: Nuka-World is an expansion pack for the 2015 post-apocalyptic action role-playing video game Fallout 4. It was developed by Bethesda Game Studios, published by Bethesda Softworks, and released on August 30, 2016, for PlayStation 4, Windows, and Xbox One. It is set in the eponymous fictional amusement park Nuka-World. As with Fallout 4, Nuka-World can be played in both first-person and third-person perspectives. The player controls the protagonist during their journey through Nuka-World, a former amusement park now divided between warring gangs of raiders. Nuka-World's main gameplay consists of both questing and exploration. Upon completion of quests, the player is rewarded with both the franchise's fictional currency, bottle caps from Nuka-Cola bottles, and experience points.

Development of Nuka-World began after Fallout 4's November 2015 release. The expansion was based partly on player feedback expressing a desire for more content involving Raiders. Rumors of Nuka-World began circulating three months before the official release after a file hinting at a new expansion was found in Fallout 4's source code. Development was confirmed by Matt Grandstaff on the Bethesda Game Studios blog. Fallout 4: Nuka-World was released to mixed reviews, with critics praising the new locations, but rated Nuka-World less favorably to Far Harbor—a previous expansion pack for the game—believing it suffered from having a less apparent story-line.

== Gameplay ==
Nuka-World takes place in an amusement park in the series' post-apocalyptic setting.

Nuka-World is an expansion pack for the action role-playing game, Fallout 4. The ability to swap between first-person and third-person perspectives is available in both the expansion and the original version. Nuka-World is the territory of raiders, roving gangs of bandits who terrorize the Commonwealth, the main game's playable area. The player can access Nuka-World when they reach level thirty, and upon arrival are subject to "The Gauntlet", a booby-trapped maze. At the end of The Gauntlet, the player must defeat the raider leader: Colter to be crowned the new leader of the raiders. The player can claim the parts of the park the raiders have not yet annexed by entering the area and defeating the enemies residing there. The enemies in Nuka-World consist of both new enemies and more powerful versions of existing ones.

The Pip-Boy – a small computer strapped to the character's wrist which contains maps, statistics, data, and items – plays a role in both Fallout 4 and Nuka-World. When the player reaches level thirty and is able to explore Nuka-World, the Pip-Boy receives a radio signal alerting the player. Nuka-World adds minor additions to the game's crafting mechanics, allowing the player to mix varieties of Nuka-Cola to create new flavors; these grant the player additional status buffs, such as temporary boosts to health, increased damage resistance, or improved S.P.E.C.I.A.L attributes. S.P.E.C.I.A.L. is an acronym denoting the character attributes which the player can distribute through the means of acquired stat points. The available character attributes consist of: strength, perception, endurance, charisma, intelligence, agility, and luck. In order to create these items, the player will need to collect raw materials from the game world and find recipe books to unlock new flavors.

== Synopsis ==
=== Setting and characters ===
The logotype for the Nuka-Cola Corporation in the Fallout series

Nuka-World is set in the eponymous Nuka-Cola themed amusement park. Once a popular tourist destination run by the Nuka-Cola Corporation, the park has since been overrun by three gangs of raiders. Unlike the raiders featured in the base game, the raiders of Nuka-World are much more disciplined and organised, with each gang following a different path.

There are three main factions of raiders within Nuka-World: the Operators, the Pack, and the Disciples. The Operators are led by Maggy "Mags" Black, alongside her brother William and their friend Lizzie Wyath; their gang is mostly interested in acquiring as much wealth as possible. The Pack is headed by Mason, the alpha of the gang; they favor a survival of the fittest mentality, and train wild animals for gambling and sport. The Disciples are led by Nisha, with her lieutenants Savoy and Dixie, and are the most bloodthirsty of the three gangs, preferring to inflict as much violence as possible. A minor faction, called the Hubologists (loosely based on Scientology), are followers of a UFO religion and live outside the park.

Nuka-World itself is divided into six smaller parts, each of which can be explored by the player: Nuka-Town, U.S.A., the park's central hub, made up of restaurants, souvenir stores, and sideshows; Kiddie Kingdom, a fantasy setting, featuring a central castle, fairground rides, and a candy theme throughout, has been overrun by Feral Ghouls; Dry Rock Gulch, a wild west-themed area, featuring roller coasters and animatronic gunslingers which has been infested with a parasitic larvae known as Bloodworms; Safari Adventure, a wildlife enclosure filled with exotic animals that have since turned feral; the Galactic Zone, a space-themed section populated by customized robots that have malfunctioned and reverted to their military specifications long before; and the Nuka-Cola bottling plant, a model Nuka-Cola factory offering guided tours and samples of Nuka-Cola products that have since leached into the environment and triggered additional mutations in the local fauna. The area surrounding Nuka-World includes: Bradberton, a town built to house park employees, the defunct Nuka-World power plant, Grandchester, a haunted mansion and tourist attraction, and the Nuka-World scrapyard containing a UFO-themed carnival ride which the Hubologists are convinced is a genuine spaceship.

Like the Island in Far Harbor, Nuka-World is outside the Commonwealth. The player can access Nuka-World by riding a monorail called the Nuka-Express.

=== Plot ===
The Sole Survivor investigates a pre-War amusement park, Nuka-World, when radio advertisements are broadcast into the Commonwealth. Porter Gage, a veteran raider, contacts the Sole Survivor after boarding a monorail and tells them that they are walking into a death trap. Upon arrival, the Sole Survivor must navigate an increasingly-deadly obstacle course called the Gauntlet, which culminates with a fight with Colter, the raider Overboss. Following the death of Colter, Gage reveals the leaders of the three raider gangs conspired to usurp him, using the broadcast and the Gauntlet to find possible replacements. The Sole Survivor is offered to become the Overboss, but must balance the competing needs of each gang of raiders while conquering the outlying areas of the park. Once the entire park is under raider control, the Sole Survivor sets about expanding raider influence in the Commonwealth by conquering settlements, restoring power to Nuka-World to make the park self-sufficient, and thwarting attempts by the Gunners—a band of amoral mercenaries—to seize control of Nuka-World for themselves.

As the Sole Survivor gradually expands their influence, tape recordings and journal entries reveal that despite its popularity, Nuka-World was under threat from serious mismanagement in the weeks and months prior to the Great War. Gradually, John-Caleb Bradberton, the creator of Nuka-Cola and the architect of Nuka-World, is revealed to have redirected resources to fund Project Cobalt, a weapons development project for the United States military. This culminated in the creation of Nuka-Cola Quantum, a variation of Nuka-Cola made with radioactive isotopes. In exchange for his support, the military agreed to include Bradberton in LEAP-X, an attempt to artificially prolong life; however, Braxton, the general in charge of Project Cobalt, saw Bradberton's prediction of an imminent war as a lack of confidence in the military, and thus betrayed him. When the Sole Survivor accesses Bradberton's office, they discover a hidden elevator leading to a private Vault. Inside is Bradberton's still-living head attached to a life support machine; a punishment by Braxton for doubting the military. The player is given the choice of shutting off the power and euthanizing Bradberton at his request or keeping him alive for the sake of Sierra Petrovita, a recurring character from Fallout 3 who idolises Bradberton.

==== Endings ====
Eventually, the gang the Sole Survivor has been most neglecting will turn on them and take over the power plant of Nuka-World. With the remaining two gangs by their side, the Sole Survivor will have to eliminate the rogue gang. Their actions ultimately decide who controls Nuka-World. In an alternate scenario, they are also given the option of ending raider influence by assassinating the leaders of each gang and their lieutenants, thereby returning control of Nuka-World to the traders who originally used it as a hub of commerce.

== Development and release ==
Nuka-World is the sixth and last expansion pack for Bethesda Game Studios' 2015 video game Fallout 4 and was released on August 30, 2016, following the releases of: Automatron, Wasteland Workshop, Far Harbor, Contraptions Workshop and Vault-Tec Workshop. Nuka-World is included in the season pass. The development for Nuka-World did not begin until after the November 2015 release of Fallout 4. Bethesda's Mark Teare said the expansion was partly the result of feedback from people who wished for more content surrounding Raiders. (Note: Raiders are a type of enemy from the base game.) Rumors surrounding Nuka-World started circulating in May 2016 after Reddit user flashman7870 uncovered a segment of code which referenced a file called "DLCNukaWorld.esm". (Note: The suffix for "Elder Scrolls Master" files is .esm. These are the main game files.) Many fans speculated the expansion would incorporate an amusement park.

Nuka-World's release date of August 30, 2016 for PlayStation 4, Windows, and Xbox One was announced in a post on the Bethesda Game Studios blog on August 15, along with the expansion's trailer. Bethesda started releasing keys for the beta version on August 16 and pre-release gameplay was live streamed through Twitch on August 23, with the official trailer coming out two days later. The expansion has a larger file size than Far Harbor, being 3.66 GB as opposed to 2.69 GB. This resulted in people wondering if Nuka-World would contain more gameplay, although the price implied it would be somewhere between Automatron and Far Harbor. The North American release of Nuka-World on PlayStation 4 was delayed due to unknown problems. Unlike the PS4 launch of Far Harbor, no major stability or frame-rate issues were found while playing, except when inside a location called The Galactic Zone. In the article on the website Push Square, it was noted that the cause of the frame-rate issues in The Galactic Zone were unknown and were not consistent.

== Reception ==
Fallout 4: Nuka-World

Aggregate score
Aggregator	Score
Metacritic	PC: 75/100; PS4: 63/100; XONE: 75/100

Review scores
Publication	Score
Destructoid	6/10
GameRevolution	PC: 4/5
IGN	PC: 7.9/10; XONE: 8/10
PC Gamer (US)	PC: 76/100
iDigitalTimes	5/5
USgamer	3/5

Edit on Wikidata

Nuka-World received both positive and mixed reviews, according to the video game review aggregator site Metacritic. The PC and Xbox One releases received "generally favorable" reviews while the PS4 release received "mixed or average" reviews. Many critics, including Christopher Livingston (PC Gamer), Davide Ambrosiani (IGN), and Juan Garcia (IGN) liked the new places to explore. Reviewers, including Paul Tassi (Forbes) and Nicholas Tan (Game Revolution), compared Nuka-World to Far Harbor, with many thinking this expansion had a less developed story-line, and was thus less story-based.

Reviewers enjoyed exploring the new map and world which Nuka-World added. Christopher Livingston (PC Gamer) thought that "attacking settlements, especially your own, is good fun, but there's [sic] hours of chores to complete before you can really become a raider." Bob Fekete (iDigitalTimes) believed exploring the map of Nuka-World is some of the best gameplay in Fallout 4. Davide Ambrosiani (IGN) said Fallout 4's last expansion pack added some interesting mechanics and expands the world further. Juan Garcia (IGN) wrote about how he believed the expansion added a "great new location" which added a few more hours of gameplay, although it was more limited and repetitive than he wanted. Andrew Webster (The Verge) enjoyed exploring the map and discovering every detail of Fallout's world. He regarded it as a "superb piece of worldbuilding."

Many critics compared Nuka-World to a previous expansion pack for Fallout 4 named Far Harbor. Dan Stapleton (IGN) said that when compared to Far Harbor, the role-playing elements are far less developed, though he also said Nuka-World has a nice setting filled with surprises and battles. Nicholas Tan (Game Revolution) also believed it was one of the better expansion packs, albeit not having such an in-depth story-line as Far Harbor. Paul Tassi (Forbes) preferred Far Harbor due to this expansion being light on story.

Reviewers thought the expansion would be worth the player's investment if they enjoyed Fallout 4. Kirk McKeand (Eurogamer) said there are no real choices to make in Nuka-World, though it still may be worthy of your time. Kat Bailey (USgamer) liked the expansion, and thought there was a lot to do in it, but not all of it is interesting. She said the expansion "could be worse, but it could also be a whole lot better", but if you enjoyed Fallout 4, then "there's good reason to pick up Nuka-World." Nic Rowen (Destructoid) noted fans of the genre will probably enjoy Nuka-World, but others will be left unsatisfied. Tassi believed it was worth the $20. Andrew Webster finished his review by saying Nuka-World was only for dedicated players.
