= Nuka-Cola =

Fictional brand in the Fallout franchise

- Fallout organization
- Brand logo
- First appearance: Fallout (1997)
- Created by: Tim Cain
- Location: United States
- Key people: John Caleb-Bradberton

Nuka-Cola is a fictional soft drink brand sold by the Nuka-Cola Corporation, a fictional American company within the Fallout franchise. First appearing in the debut 1997 video game Fallout, it was created by the title creator Tim Cain simply for the purpose of parodying the real-world soda brand Coca-Cola, evident by the design aesthetics of the red and white logo and soda. Since 2008 for the eventual release of Fallout 3 under the game company Bethesda Softworks, the fictional Nuka-Cola soda brand has been tied into promotional material, making it a key and recognizable part of the game series' identity. Various merchandise products sold under Bethesda have been sold with the Nuka-Cola brand name, and Jones Soda has produced a real Nuka-Cola in partnership with Bethesda since 2009. Nuka-Cola has been a major subject of several academic analyses that tied it into the greater commentary and themes of American nostalgia, consumerism, and potential toxicity in consumables.

In the Fallout universe, Nuka-Cola was invented in 2042, then released into public markets in 2044 by John Caleb-Bradberton. It used aggressive marketing and became the most popular soda brand in the world, embedding itself into American consumer culture. Its commercial success was to the point where it even had its own theme park named Nuka-World, featured in the Fallout 4 expansion pack Fallout 4: Nuka-World. It also created various other flavor variants, most notably the rare blue-glowing Nuka-Cola Quantum, which released into public markets on October 23 of 2077, the same day that the globally devastating nuclear fallout from the Great War of 2077 occurred. Despite the dissolution of the Nuka-Cola company as a result, Nuka-Cola sodas continued to be culturally prominent in the American wasteland and come in abundant amounts everywhere. Due to this, their bottle caps were adopted into the standard currency for major trading partners.

== Characteristics ==
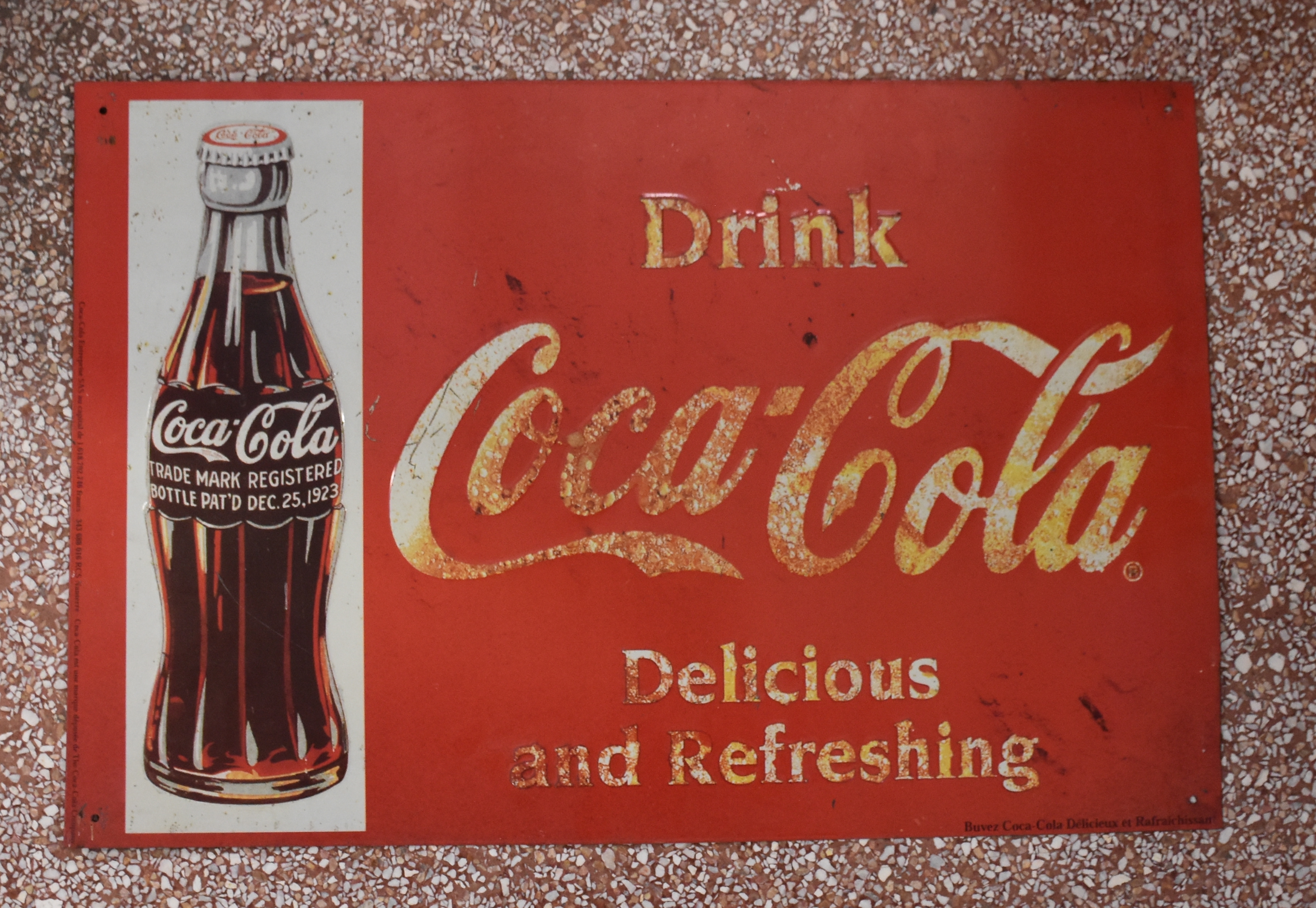
Nuka-Cola is a fictional world soft drink brand and a parody of its real-world counterpart Coca-Cola.

Nuka-Cola is the main soda brand in the American setting of the Fallout franchise, originally created by Interplay Entertainment and now owned by Bethesda Softworks. Produced by the American company, Nuka-Cola Corporation, the namesake product was invented in 2042 then released into markets in 2044 by John Caleb-Bradberton and, prior to the devastating "Great War of 2077", became the most popular soda brand internationally and even had its own theme park called Nuka-World. The brand uses red and white colors for its logo design. Nuka-Cola's mascot is a young blonde woman named Nuka Girl, who is dressed as an astronaut with a round helmet, jetpack, and bulbous pistol and often appears in advertisements for the brand. In Fallout 3, according to the Girdershade's Nuka-Cola Museum founder Sierra Petrovita, Nuka-Cola vending machines were found in almost every street within the United States by 2067. Thus, Nuka-Cola became culturally significant in the Fallout universe due to the product and the marketing on the soda brand. The latest flavor to have been released by the Nuka-Cola Corporation was the Nuka-Cola Quantum, which ended up for sale just on October 23 of 2077, the same day of nuclear bombs devastating the United States and the rest of the world. Even after the global devastation from the nuclear apocalypse since 2077, Nuka-Cola remained one of the most popular drinks within the Fallout world. This was in large part due to the abundant pre-war production of the Nuka-Cola sodas to the point where the unopened soda drinks could be sought after regularly. Bottle caps coming from soda bottles like Nuka-Cola became the standard form of currencies in the majority of the game series. This is due to the prevalence of soda bottles in the wasteland including those of Nuka-Cola, the difficulty in producing counterfeits, and the adoption of caps as standard currency by major trading powers.

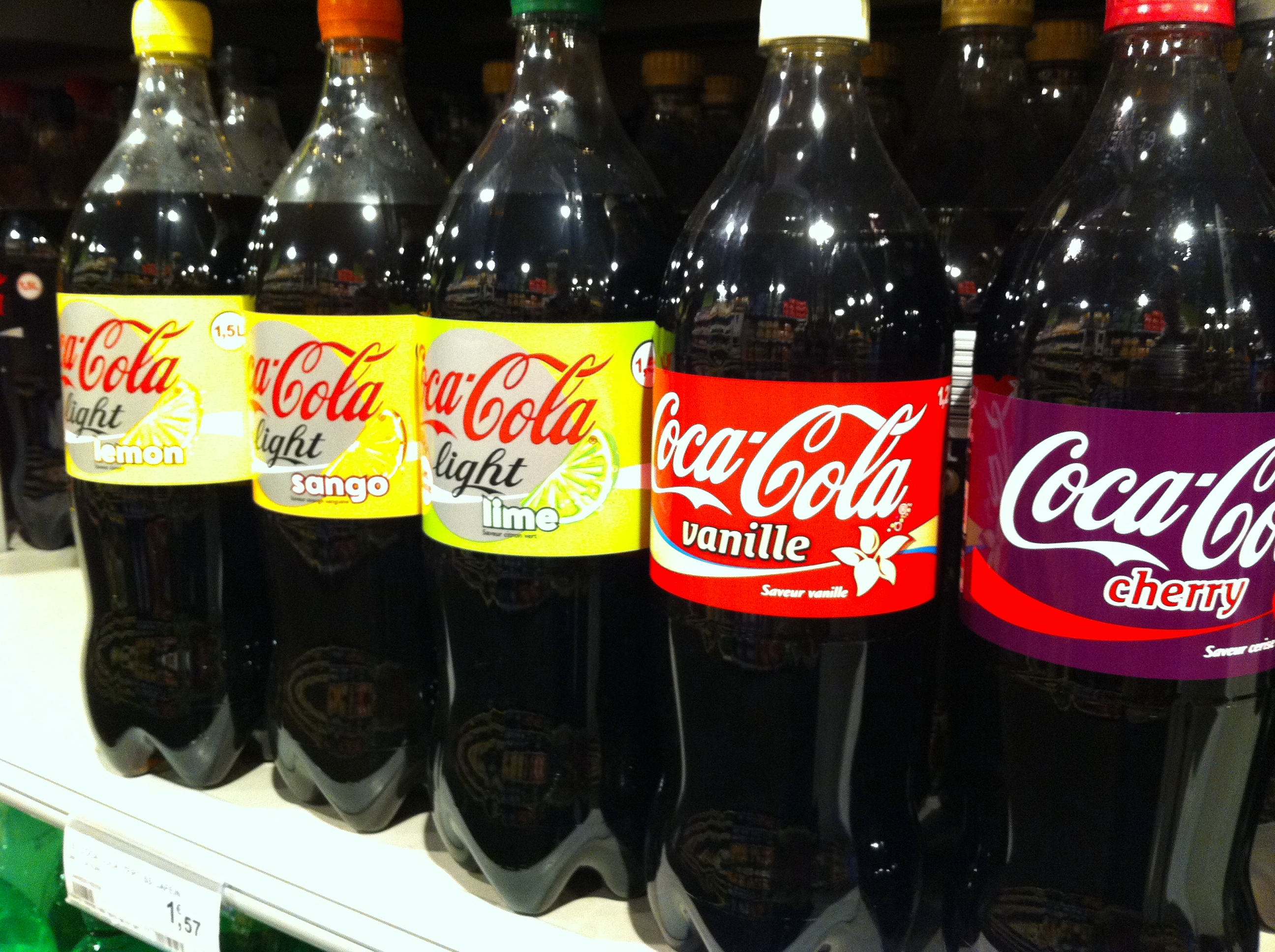
Nuka-Cola, like Coca-Cola (pictured), has had various different flavors released.

In the Fallout universe, Nuka-Cola is made up of high amounts of sugar and has a slightly radioactive glow. The soda was made out of seventeen ingredients total. Including the original flavor, there are fourteen flavors of Nuka-Cola as of Fallout 76 excluding Ice Cold Nuka-Cola, Diet Nuka-Cola, and mixed flavor combinations. There are also twenty-five mixed flavors in the Fallout games total, four of which are alcoholic. Among the most prominent non-original flavors is the Nuka-Cola Quantum, a rare neon blue-colored soda variant that debuted in Fallout 3. In the series' lore, the isotope Strontium-85, originally intended for military usage, was used to create the flavor. According to a report from the Nuka-Cola Plant in Fallout 3, all the product testers died shortly after tasting it. Strontium-90 was used to replace the other isotope as an ingredient and passed the Food and Drug Administration for public consumption, although it had a side effect of causing a week-long blue-glowing urine. Several other flavors include Nuka-Cherry, Nuka-Grape, Nuka-Cola Orange, and Nuka-Cola Victory. Some other flavors that were bought by the Nuka-Cola Corporation, like Nuka-Cola Clear and Nuka-Boost, originally came from the independent sellers Sharon's Downhome Country Lemon and Packed Full of Joe, respectively. It was not able to buy out some other companies that it faced competition with like Sunset Sarsaparilla and Vim! soda. For the former, Nuka-Cola launched Nuka-Cola Wild to compete with it while for the latter, Nuka-Cola's executive Vernon Conroy employed mercenaries to sabotage production lines.

The Nuka-Cola brand is a parody of the real-world counterpart soda brand Coca-Cola, evident by its name, logo design, and, in most games, the shape of the bottles. The Coca-Cola reference was confirmed by the first Fallout title creator Tim Cain, who also said that it was based on times when the soda brand was produced with cocaine. According to scholar Selçuk Buğra Gökalp, the word "Nuka" in the Nuka-Cola name is likely a reference to the nuclear technology prevalent in the Fallout series. In addition, the inventor name John Caleb-Bradberton is a combination of Coca-Cola inventor John Pemberton and Pepsi inventor Caleb Bradham.

== Appearances and promotions ==
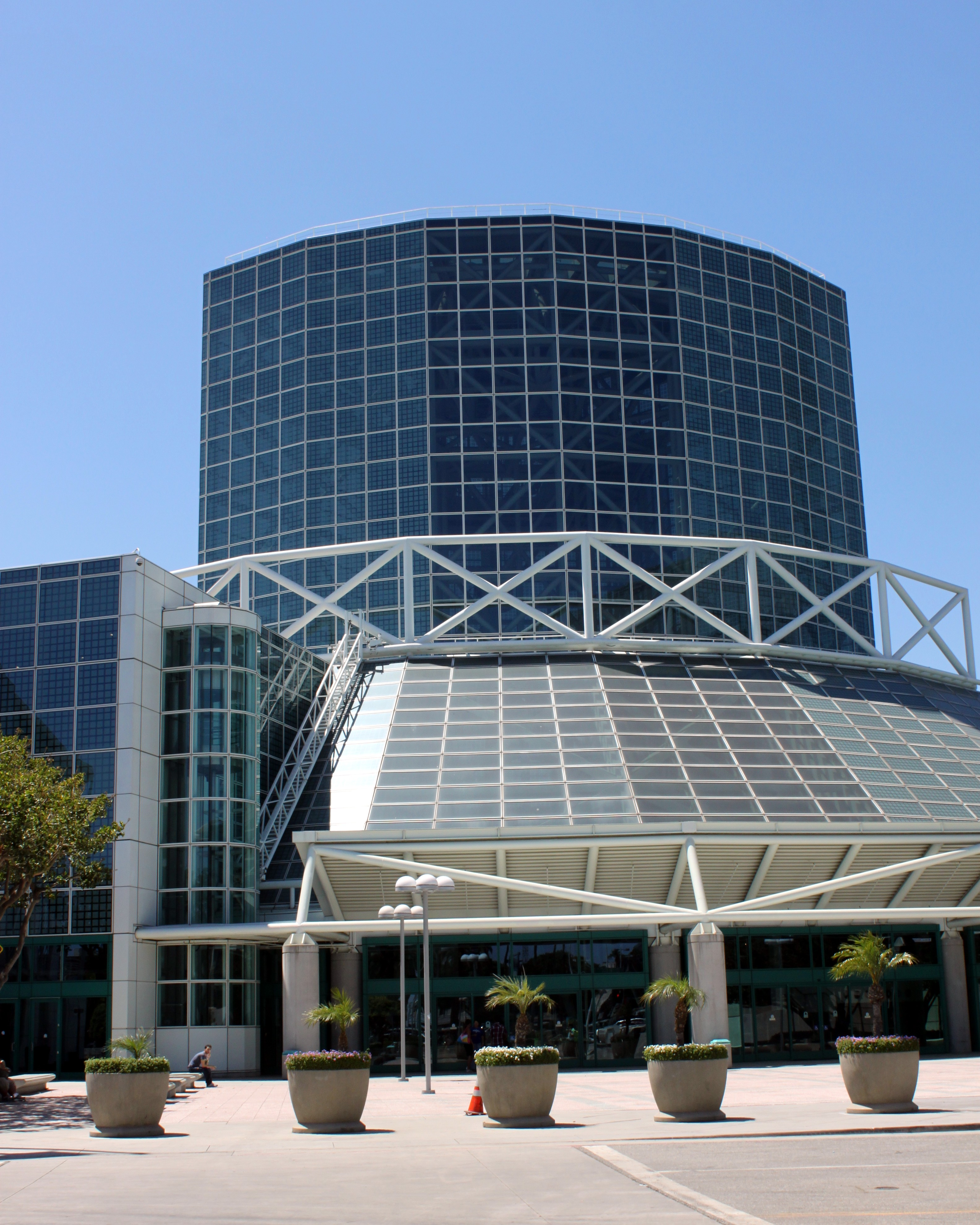
The Nuka-Cola brand was first used in promotion for the Fallout series at the 2008 E3 event at the Los Angeles Convention Center (pictured).

The Nuka-Cola brand has appeared in every Fallout title since the 1997 game. Different soda flavors of the Nuka-Cola company have made their appearances since the spinoff game Fallout Tactics: Brotherhood of Steel as well as since the mainline title Fallout 3. Of note is that not all flavors have reoccurred in subsequent titles since their debuts; some flavors are exclusive to Fallout Tactics or Fallout 76 for instance. In most titles, Nuka-Cola sodas replenish the hit points of the player character but also contain radiation points that can affect their gameplay stats. In Fallout 3, a Nuka-Cola historian named Sierra Petrovita has her own Nuka-Cola Museum that celebrates the namesake brand's history. She also offers a quest for the player character to retrieve the rare Nuka-Cola Quantum sodas for her. In Fallout 4, the Nuka-Cola brand is the central focus of the expansion pack Fallout 4: Nuka-World, where the player character enters the abandoned titular theme park, which is overrun by raider gangs (disorganized groups of bandits), and can become their raider overlord. Sierra Petrovita makes her second appearance in the series as a vacationer there, where she and the player character can collaborate in breaking into founder Bradberton's office to take the secret Nuka-Cola formula. In the spinoff game Fallout Shelter, the Nuka-Cola Quantum is a spendable consumable for speeding up or skipping quests that can be obtained as microtransactions or from completing tasks. An update for the game made to celebrate the at the time upcoming release Fallout 4: Nuka-World featured a special game event that, if completed, spawned in the Nuka-World mascot characters Bottle and Cappy to visit the player's vault periodically to grant them rewards.

As with other consumable items in the Fallout video games, drinking the Nuka-Cola drinks heals hit points for the player character. In addition, they are granted a bottle cap that they can use as currency. However, consuming too much of the soda (and other irradiated foods) can have drawbacks. In Fallout and Fallout 2, the player character can become addicted to it, albeit without suffering any negative affects like most other addictive substances. In later games of the series, the player character instead consumes radiation poisoning. This is reflected in their hit points, where the player character takes three radiation points (or "rads") from regular Nuka-Cola and ten from a Nuka-Cola Quantum. In Fallout 3 and Fallout: New Vegas, the player character's gameplay stats decrease; they will also die if they have one thousand radiation points total. In Fallout 4 and Fallout 76, every ten radiation points results in a one percent hit point loss.

The fictional Nuka-Cola brand has also been one of the major promotional representations of the Fallout franchise. It was first promoted in 2008 by Bethesda Softworks for the upcoming release of Fallout 3, with drinkable Nuka-Cola bottles distributed to attendees at the E3 trade event. Since 2009, Jones Soda Co. partnered with Bethesda to sell Nuka-Cola-themed sodas, signing a deal in 2010 to sell them in Walmart stores across the US. In promotion of the release day of Fallout 4 in 2015, Jones Soda sold "Nuka-Cola Quantum" sodas, themselves rebrands of the berry lemonade flavor, at Target for a limited time. In later years, the company additionally released "Nuka Victory Cola" and "Nuka-Grape Cola" flavors and rereleased the "Nuka-Cola Quantum" flavor. The soda reviewer Griffin Parker, writing for Sporked, described the Nuka-Cola Quantum flavor as "super-sour" and praised the Nuka-Grape Soda flavor as "a fantastic grape soda" for its "great natural" flavor with cane sugar to sweeten it. The Nuka-Cola brand has been featured in various other forms of official merchandise, with empty replica bottles featuring labels of different flavors being one example, although they are not intended to be drinking utensils. Other forms of Nuka-Cola merchandise include bottle openers, cups, growlers, shirts, mini fridges, computer cases, and figurines. Nuka-Cola has also been part of a Fallout crossover in Fortnite as a health power-up item.

== Analysis ==
Long since its debut in the Fallout series, the Nuka-Cola brand has been the subject of several academic analyses, with British academic scholar Andra Ivănescu referring to the use of Nuka-Cola bottle caps as literal currency and Sierra Petrovita's enthusiasm over Nuka-Cola in Fallout 3 as instances of persisting cultural currency, whether literally or by selling the idea of the American Dream. She wrote that Petrovita celebrates Nuka-Cola as "this symbol of capitalism and popular culture that persists" even after a devastating war, therefore being one of the two Fallout 3 museum curators who "embody different American mythologies". Jess Morrissette, writing for the academic journal Game Studies, said that the frequency of Nuka-Cola in the Fallout series is "a telling commentary on the centrality of soda machines to modern life". He acknowledged the rarity of Nuka-Cola soda machines in Fallout 3 but suggested that it still ties into the common appearances of beverage machines in video games, which themselves connect the player into immersivity and remind them of capitalistic values of brand recognition and consumerism. Additionally, he said, the continued prominence of Nuka-Cola sodas would have been proven by the lack of real healthy drink alternatives after nuclear devastation.

Selçuk Buğra Gökalp argued in a journal for Medialog TR that Nuka-Cola was a symbol of American consumer culture in the Fallout franchise, evident by the "innovative products" like Nuka-Cola Quantum and the extensive promotional campaigns and the use of the mascot Nuka Girl as a "reflection of the capitalist system in the Fallout universe". Thus, he stated, it "symbolizes the ideologies and cultural structure of the pre-war era" and is a reference to the consumer culture of the 1950s, especially as an extension of American national identity. The retroactive aesthetics of the Fallout world, Gökalp wrote, is highlighted by the design of the red and white bottle caps that creates an ironic tone between the more cheerful pre-war world versus the gloomy post-war world. He also interpreted the usage of Nuka-Cola bottle caps as currency as senses of nostalgia of overconsumption and its role in severe consequences for humanity. Games and Culture journal author Sarah Stang similarly highlighted Nuka-Cola sodas and their bottle caps as potential commentary on the close ties between "toxic consumption (toxic in that [Nuka-Cola] is both full of aspartame and highly irradiated), atomic culture, capitalism, and consumerism". She said that the health consequences of consuming irradiated Nuka-Cola, while a common trope in science fiction, is realistic due to real world concerns over toxic contaminants in consumables, potentially coming from smaller-scale concerns like pesticide items and larger-scale ones like the Chernobyl disaster. Stang argued that the common real-world promotion of Nuka-Cola for the Fallout series makes it "one of the most recognizably 'Fallout' objects".
