= Vault Boy =

Mascot of the Fallout series

- Fallout character
- First appearance: Fallout (1997)
- Created by: Leonard Boyarsky
- Designed by: George Almond; Tramell Ray Isaac

Vault Boy is the mascot of the Fallout media franchise. Created by staff at Interplay Entertainment, the original owners of the Fallout intellectual property, Vault Boy was introduced in 1997's Fallout as an advertising character representing Vault-Tec, a fictional megacorporation that built a series of specialized fallout shelters throughout the United States prior to the nuclear holocaust that sets up the world state of the Fallout universe. Within the video game series, Vault Boy serves as a representation of the player character's statistical information within user interface (UI) menus, and is a recurring element in Vault-Tec products found throughout the fictional Fallout universe. In the 2024 Fallout television series, Vault Boy is depicted as having been inspired by Vault-Tec advertisements featuring fictional actor Cooper Howard (portrayed by Walton Goggins).

Vault Boy's design was developed by Leonard Boyarsky, who drew inspiration from 1950s films as well as the visual aesthetic of the economics-themed board game Monopoly. Vault Boy is a ubiquitous feature in promotional material and merchandising for the Fallout brand, and is regarded by critics to be one of the most recognizable elements of the franchise and the embodiment of its sardonic, retrofuturistic themes.

== Concept and design ==
Vault Boy was unnamed in 1997's Fallout, although the game's instruction manual refers to the character as Vault-Man. He was created by Leonard Boyarsky, who originally thought of him as the "skill guy" when he developed the character's first piece of concept art. Vault Boy was partly based on Rich Uncle Pennybags' aesthetic from the Monopoly board game, and Boyarsky came up with the idea and design for the Vault Boy “cards”, which is intended to evoke the feel of Monopoly cards by showing the character engaged in a variety of activities in humorous ways. Vault Boy was drawn for Fallout by George Almond for the first few cards and by Tramell Ray Isaac who finalized the look of the character. The character is inspired by films made during the 1950s, in particular the cartoon character Bert the Turtle from the 1952 civil defense animated live-action social guidance film Duck and Cover, and parodies the dualities of cheery optimism and sub-surface paranoia from that era.

Brian Menze was responsible for all Vault Boy images drawn for 1998's Fallout 2 and 2010's Fallout: New Vegas, and he followed Isaac's art style for the character. On the other hand, the developers of the 2001 spin-off title Fallout Tactics: Brotherhood of Steel, Micro Forté, confused Vault Boy with another in-universe element called the Pip-Boy. As "Pipboy", the character's iteration in Tactics as well as the traditional series of caricatures representing skills and perks were drawn by Ed Orman. Micro Forté's choice of name for the character was retained by ex-Interplay writer Chris Avellone when he developed and self-published the Fallout Bible in 2002. Commenting on the confusion, Boyarsky clarified in a 2004 interview that "Vault Boy" was always intended to be the character's name, while the Pip Boy is supposed to be "the little guy on your Pip Boy interface" which is based on the Bob's Big Boy mascot. Bethesda Softworks, the developers of the franchise beginning with Fallout 3, established the use of the name "Vault Boy" for the mascot character following their acquisition of the franchise in the mid-2000s. Natalia Smirnova drew the character for Fallout 3 and Fallout 4.

As the mascot of Fallout, Vault Boy is frequently used to convey the series' "often goony, occasionally nasty sense of humor". Orman's favorite illustration of the character from Tactics was for the special damage effect of "immobile", where he still wears a "happy, devil-may-care grin" even though his body is horribly mutilated. During the development of Fallout 2, Menze was asked to come up with a perk illustration for the “Childkiller” reputation that would be bestowed on the player character should he or she happen to kill a child character, accidentally or otherwise. Menze finalized an image of a perky Vault Boy kicking a pregnant woman in the stomach, and reasoned that his approach was the least offensive way to present an illustration of a literal child killer. Both Menze and the designer who requested it later realized that it was inappropriate and agreed not to use it, which became the only Vault Boy image to ever be cut from Fallout 2.

== Description ==
The corporate logo of Vault-Tec

Vault Boy is the mascot character of the Vault-Tec Corporation, also referred to as Vault-Tec Industries, appearing in their adverts, manuals, products and training films. Although Vault-Tec's slogan, “revolutionising safety for an uncertain future”, suggests a company with people's best interests in mind, it is consistently portrayed as an unscrupulous corporation. Within series lore, Vault-Tec was contracted by the U.S. government for a nationwide project in 2054 to build fallout shelters known as "Vaults" for the American public in anticipation of possible nuclear war with its enemies. Each Vault is self-sufficient and theoretically capable of sustaining their inhabitants indefinitely; however, the Vault project was never intended as a viable method of repopulating the United States in the event of a nuclear holocaust. Instead, most Vaults were secret, unethical social experiments, designed to determine the effects of different environmental and psychological conditions on their inhabitants. Within this context, Vault Boy is cynically deployed as misdirection to reassure unsuspecting individuals who may be repeatedly manipulated and endangered by experiments which are hidden behind the front of benign fallout shelters.

Vault Boy is presented as a young male cartoon character, dressed in a blue and yellow jumpsuit, with blond hair styled in a distinctive swirl. His default expression is a wide beaming smile, but has been shown to make other facial expressions as well. His signature pose is to stand with a hand extended in a thumbs up, sometimes with one eye closed. The character's in-game function is to communicate information to players: for example, he is used to represent the player in Fallout 4's perk tree menu, or in a video explaining the SPECIAL character statistics system. Vault Boy also appears in illustrations for achievements and trophies for the video games developed following Bethesda's acquisition of the Fallout IP. Vault Boy is sometimes presented as a female equivalent, Vault Girl, who is also blonde and wears similar attire.

In 2015's Fallout Shelter, Vault Boy's distinct art style is employed for the randomly generated Vault Dwellers which players manage in the game.

A customizable skin for the Mii Gunner character based on Vault Boy was added to Super Smash Bros. Ultimate via downloadable content on June 22, 2020.

In the 2024 Fallout television series, it is implied that Vault Boy is based on actor Cooper Howard, portrayed by Walton Goggins, who was the original face of Vault-Tec advertisements before being replaced with the Vault Boy mascot.

== Cultural impact ==
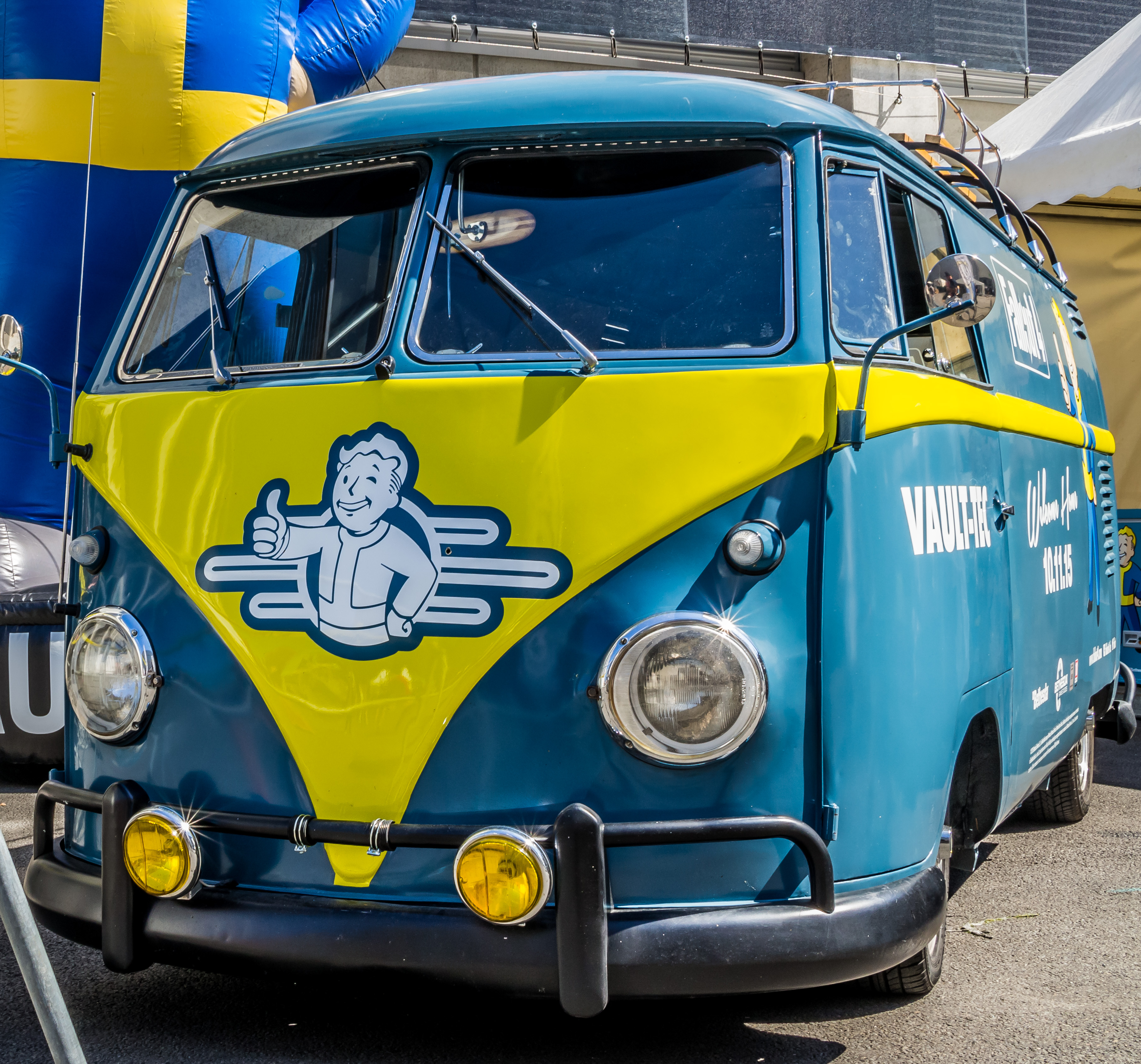
A Volkswagen van featuring Vault Boy and the Vault-Tec logo at Gamescom 2015

Critics noted that Vault Boy has achieved a level of cultural impact and viral recognition outside of the character's original context, which was not anticipated by former Interplay staff such as Tim Cain and Feargus Urquhart during the franchise's early years. This is in spite of the fact that Vault Boy is not a character the player can encounter in the Fallout universe. Jeremy Peel from PCGamesN claimed that Vault Boy, as a mascot for the series' "sardonic, faux-1950s imagery", has become "as recognisable as Mickey Mouse". Empire published an article in 2010 which ranked Vault Boy among the 50 greatest video game characters. Time Magazine named Vault Boy the third most influential video game character of all time, lauding his "gloriously absurd and irreverent spectrum of dispositions and postures, from hyperbolic simpering to grisly dismemberments", which made him an icon of surreal humour in a similar manner as characters from the Monty Python series.

A fan theory about Vault Boy was that the character's signature pose is a discreet method to determine whether an individual is within the fallout radius of a nuclear explosion and thus safe from radiation or otherwise. Former Interplay staff, such as Brian Fargo and Tramell Ray Isaac, insisted that the character is not hiding a secret meaning and is simply giving a show of encouragement. The "thumbs up" theory was later integrated into the 2024 Fallout television series.

Writing for the 2017 publication 100 Greatest Video Game Characters, Rowan Derrick described Vault Boy as both a symbol of an idyllic world before nuclear war and a constant reminder of that world's failures; a concept that encompasses the promise of a pseudo-1950s nuclear powered paradise even though it directly contradicts the in-universe post-apocalyptic wasteland; and an illustration of the tension between humanity's penchant for harming each other and an ambivalence towards a technologically advanced civil society. Matthew Byrd from Den of Geek drew comparisons between Vault Boy and Miss Minutes from the Marvel Cinematic Universe, citing them as notable examples of "the Smiling Faces of Bureaucracy, Corruption, and Propaganda", where storytellers co opt retrofuturistic designs to serve as a form of social commentary. Vivian Asimos noted the popular use of Vault Boy's signature pose in sarcastic circumstances to be a notable example of video game content forming the backbone of numerous internet memes due to its participatory nature.

Upon the release of Fortnite's Chapter 5 Season 3, Vault Boy appeared in the battle pass as an emoticon performing a variety of facial and hand gestures.
