= Fallout Shelter =

2015 simulation video game

- App icon
- Developers: Bethesda Game Studios; Behaviour Interactive
- Publisher: Bethesda Softworks
- Producer: Craig Lafferty
- Designers: Emmanuelle Hardy-Senecal; Tomas Henriquez; Janick Neveu
- Programmers: Federico Cicchi; Daniel Amthauer
- Artists: Istvan Pely; Ilya Nazarov; Jaime Villa
- Writer: Emil Pagliarulo
- Series: Fallout
- Engine: Unity
- Platforms: iOS; Android; Windows; Xbox One; Nintendo Switch; PlayStation 4
- Release: June 14, 2015: iOS; June 14, 2015; Android; August 13, 2015; Windows; July 14, 2016; Xbox One; February 7, 2017; Nintendo Switch, PS4; June 10, 2018
- Genres: Construction and management simulation, survival
- Mode: Single-player

Fallout Shelter is a free-to-play construction and management simulation video game developed by Bethesda Game Studios, with assistance by Behaviour Interactive, and published by Bethesda Softworks. Part of the Fallout series, it was released worldwide for iOS devices in June 2015, for Android devices in August 2015, for Windows in July 2016, for Xbox One in February 2017, and for Nintendo Switch and PlayStation 4 in June 2018. The game is also available on Tesla vehicles. The game tasks the player with building and effectively managing their own Vault, a fallout shelter.

Upon release, Fallout Shelter received mostly positive reviews. Critics enjoyed the game's extension of the Fallout universe, the core gameplay, and its visual style. Common criticisms included the game's lack of depth, its use of microtransactions, and its lack of an ending. The game grossed US$5.1 million (equivalent to about $6.9M in 2025) in microtransaction sales in the first two weeks after its release.

== Gameplay ==
Ant farm view. Vault resources are shown along the top of the screen. A notification appears when a room produces resources.

In Fallout Shelter, players build and manage their Vault as an Overseer, its leader and coordinator. Players guide and direct the citizens of the Vault, known as dwellers, and need to keep them happy through meeting their needs such as power, food, and water. They rescue dwellers from the wasteland and assign them to different resource-generating buildings in the Vault, using the SPECIAL statistics system from the other Fallout games. Each character's SPECIAL profile affects their ability to generate different resources, and their statistics can be increased by training them in rooms devoted to each stat. The dwellers can level up over time, increasing their health, and can be given items and weapons to help with various tasks. The number of dwellers can be increased by waiting for dwellers from the wasteland to arrive or by pairing a male and a female dweller in living quarters to produce children.

Balancing resources such as food, water, and power is an important aspect of the game. Many different rooms can be built in the Vault, providing different items or stat bonuses. Players are not required to spend money in order to accelerate long timers or processes, instead having the option to rush the room at the risk of triggering an incident – such as fires or "radroach" infestations. Players are sometimes rewarded with lunchboxes that contain cards, that could give them items, resources or dwellers, which can be purchased separately through microtransactions.

== Development and release ==
In a 2009 interview with Engadget, while talking about a possible Fallout game for iOS, Bethesda's Todd Howard said that the world of Fallout was "unique enough that it could translate to any platform", revealing that several designs of an iOS Fallout game were pitched and rejected. On November 5, 2009 John Carmack, who at that time worked for id Software, said that while it was nothing official yet, he had an internal proof of concept made for a Fallout iPhone game. Carmack said that he would likely be personally involved in making the game, although at the time he was working on other projects. He added that "at the very least I'm going to be providing code."

Fallout Shelter was announced by Bethesda during its press conference at the Electronic Entertainment Expo on June 14, 2015, where it was confirmed the game is a free-to-play title that would be released for iOS the same day. It was developed in a partnership with Behaviour Interactive, and was built using the Unity game engine. The game was released for Android devices on August 13, 2015.

According to Pete Hines, vice president of Bethesda, the game is inspired by other video games like Little Computer People, Progress Quest, XCOM, SimCity and FTL: Faster Than Light.

=== Updates and ports ===
On June 30, 2015, the game added a character from Fallout 4 as a dweller. Preston Garvey, the leader of Commonwealth Minutemen, was added as a reward available from lunchboxes, along with his Laser Musket weapon, which can be equipped by other Vault dwellers. On July 10, 2015, the game received its first update which fixed some problems while adding a new "Photo Mode" feature that allows players to capture and share images of their Vault. On August 13, a major update was launched for the iOS version, alongside the release of the Android version, adding mole rats and deathclaws as new enemies. It also added a feature where raiders would also steal caps, instead of only stealing resources as before, and a robot butler named "Mister Handy", only available through lunchboxes.

On October 15, the game received update 1.2 that added cloud saving, survival mode, Russian language support and Piper, a character from Fallout 4 available only for iOS version through lunchboxes. The update added a statistics page, ability to skip tutorial and a new gameplay feature where dwellers can loot equipment from dead raiders. Later in October, the game received a Halloween-themed update that added room decorations and outfits. The update removed the limit introduced in the previous update on number of dwellers that can be sent to explore the Wasteland.

On November 22, the game received a Thanksgiving-themed update. The update added outfits and decorations. On December 10, the game received update 1.3 which added new features like pets including Dogmeat, ability to evict Vault dwellers, a sell all function for clearing out the inventory at once and new pickup lines and conversations for Vault dwellers. The update also added snow and Christmas-themed decorations.

In March 2016, update 1.4 was released which added a crafting system, rooms, a card in lunchboxes containing junk used in crafting, pets and a barbershop. Update 1.5 was released in April 2016, adding customization options for Vault dwellers along with the ability to scrap unwanted items and support for 3D Touch. Update 1.6 was released on July 14, 2016, adding a quest system, two new enemies (Feral Ghouls and Radscorpions) and two items in the shop. Additionally, the combat system was tweaked in the update.

Update 1.6, along with the PC version of the game, was announced at Bethesda's press conference before Electronic Entertainment Expo 2016 held on June 12, 2016. Both of them were revealed to be coming in July. The PC version was released on the Bethesda.net platform alongside the update on July 14.

Bethesda released an Xbox One version of Fallout Shelter on February 7, 2017; the title supports Xbox Play Anywhere, allowing synchronizing of data and achievements for users with Windows 10.

On March 28, 2017, Bethesda released the PC version of the game on Steam.

During the Bethesda E3 2018 Showcase on June 10, 2018, the game was announced and later released that day for the PlayStation 4 and Nintendo Switch platforms, making it the very first game in the Fallout series to be available on a Nintendo platform, not counting the Fallout pinball adaptation that was released as part of the Bethesda Pinball collection in late 2016 for Zen Pinball 2, which was available on the Wii U.

In May 2020, Fallout Shelter was added to Tesla vehicles for in-car play.

In 2025, Fallout Shelter was one of several games that were affected by a security vulnerability in the Unity engine; it was removed from digital storefronts on October 3, 2025, to address the issue. The game was later relisted and updated, adding new content from the mobile release as well as fixing the vulnerability.

=== Lawsuit ===
On June 21, 2018, Bethesda Softworks sued Warner Bros. Entertainment and Behaviour Interactive over Westworld, an Android/iOS mobile game based on the Westworld TV series, alleging that the game is a "blatant rip-off" of Fallout Shelter.

In a suit filed in a Maryland U.S. District Court, Bethesda alleges that Westworld — developed by Behaviour — "has the same or highly similar game design, art style, animations, features and other gameplay elements" as Fallout Shelter and Westworld illegally "uses the same copyrighted computer code" as Fallout Shelter. Bethesda sued for copyright infringement, breach of contract and misappropriating trade secrets, seeking a jury trial and damages. By January 2019, Bethesda announced it had reached an agreement with Warner Bros. and Behaviour with undisclosed terms, halting its lawsuit against them.

On January 15, 2019, Westworld was removed from Google Play and Apple stores. An in-game announcement stated that only existing players could continue playing until April 16, 2019, when the game would be taken offline.

== Reception ==
Reception

Aggregate score
Aggregator	Score
Metacritic	(iOS) 71/100 (PC) 63/100 (NS) 61/100

Review scores
Publication	Score
Destructoid	7/10
Game Informer	7/10
GameRevolution	3.5/5
GamesTM	6/10
IGN	6.8/10
New York Daily News	3/5
Financial Post	7.5/10
Gamezebo	4/5
Pocket Gamer	7/10
VentureBeat	95/100

Fallout Shelter received "mixed or average" reviews, according to video game review aggregator website Metacritic.

Reviewers generally enjoyed the gameplay, though criticized its lack of depth. Harry Slater from Pocket Gamer stated, "It's not exactly the most exciting post-apocalyptic game out there, but if casual is your bag there's a lot to like here." Chris Carter from Destructoid wrote, "I don't want to play it every day forever and ever, but it's definitely worth the time I invested in it." Justin Davis of IGN remarked "Fallout Shelter is desperately in need of a set of endgame goals or resource sinks to look forward to."

The visuals also gained some praise. Daniel Tack of Game Informer summarized the visuals as "flavorful in the iconic Vault Boy aesthetic." Chris Carter remarked that "visually, Fallout Shelter is far more impressive than most resource-management games on the market". Jason Faulkner of Gamezebo found the graphics "impressive", writing "not only are the cute little Vault dwellers presented in sharp, Fallout-faithful style, but the vault itself is quite stunning."

Reviewers had mixed opinions about the game's inclusion of microtransactions. Jeb Haught of Game Revolution opined, "when I add the micro-transaction advantage to the post apocalyptic mix, the result puts a sour taste in my mouth". Daniel Tack claimed that "the cash shop option in this free-to-play game is completely unobtrusive and unnecessary". In contrast, Justin Davis says that "virtually every other gameplay element must be earned the old-fashioned mobile way – by just waiting around."

Fallout Shelter became the most popular free iOS application in the U.S. and UK within a day of its release, and the most popular iOS game on June 26, 2015. By June 12, 2016, Fallout Shelter had over 50 million players. Studio director Todd Howard estimated they had 75 million players by February 2017. By June 2019 the game was downloaded more than 150 million times. By June 2020 the game was downloaded more than 170 million times. Because of Fallout Shelter's success, the studio has been working on a second mobile title.

=== Revenue ===
On the day of its release, Fallout Shelter became the third-highest-grossing game in the iOS App Store. By July 16, 2015, two weeks after release, the game earned $5.1 million (equivalent to about $6.9M in 2025) in microtransaction sales. The game grossed $100 million (~$124 million in 2025) in lifetime revenue by June 2019.

=== Awards ===
List of awards and nominations
Award	Category	Result	Ref.
33rd Golden Joystick Awards	Best Mobile Game	Won	
The Game Awards 2015	Best Mobile/Handheld Game	Nominated	
19th Annual D.I.C.E. Awards	Mobile Game of the Year	Won	
19th Annual D.I.C.E. Awards	Strategy/Simulation Game of the Year	Nominated	

== Legacy ==
An MMO sequel by Shengqu Games, Fallout Shelter Online, was released in partnership with Gaea in Southeast Asia, Japan and Korea in mid-2020. A multiplayer board game adaptation of Fallout Shelter was released in late 2020. A spiritual successor, The Elder Scrolls: Castles, was released in 2024.

The live-action reality television competition, Fallout Shelter: The Experiment, which is based on the mobile game, has been ordered for Amazon Prime Video.
