= Season pass (video games) =

Video game downloadable content model

A season pass is a form of video game monetization in which consumers purchase a discounted package for current and future downloadable content (DLC) and/or expansion packs for a video game atop its base cost. A game may have a single season pass or, for some lifestyle games, new season passes over time. The name originates from the concept of a season pass/ticket for sports. First introduced around 2011, the use of season passes became commonplace among triple-A and mobile game publishers by the end of the 2010s. Season passes can be controversial because the contents of a season pass are not fully itemized beforehand or may not contain all planned DLC, with some instances of season passes being called scams by the gaming press.

== Approach ==
Season passes may be available to purchase alongside the game prior to its release, or may be available after the game's release. Once purchased, the player gains all content that has been released to date under that season pass and eligible for future, unannounced content. Many season passes state the type of content that players will get even though the exact content may be unknown at the time.

Season passes may cover all planned expansion content for a game and represents a one-time purchase. In other cases, season passes cover the content of a game for a limited period of time, on the order of months to years, which allow the developer to continue to add more content in lieu of developing a wholly new title as to continue to draw in revenue. For example, Ubisoft's Rainbow Six Siege has used annual season passes that give players that purchase them access to new playable characters ("operators"), maps, weapons, and game modes. Some of these elements can be obtained by players without a season pass, using in-game credits, while other content remains exclusive to those with the pass. Ubisoft has considered this a better approach for players rather than developing a sequel. Similarly, Destiny 2 used an annual pass model for its second year of content, providing players with access to exclusive content through three DLC drops over the course of the year; for the game's third year, they switched to a season pass model, with each season's seasonal pass available to purchase à la carte.

== History ==
One of the first season passes in video games was used by Rockstar Games with L.A. Noire in 2011. In June of that year, Warner Bros. Interactive Entertainment continued the trend with Mortal Kombat, and Electronic Arts released their EA Sports Season Ticket in August 2011. By the mid 2010s, season passes had become common in AAA games. By the end of the decade, season passes continued to be offered for many games, although some publishers began to forgo offering them in favor of free DLC due to the negative publicity created by their announcement shortly after release.

The rising popularity of loot boxes and microtransactions at the time also played a role in the decreasing popularity of the season pass, although the gaming press has speculated that this may result in less post-release content overall. Alternatively, some games shifted to the "battle pass" concept popularized by Fortnite Battle Royale, which utilize time-limited "seasons" of rewards unlocked via experience points earned through gameplay and in-game challenges, with users able to optionally accelerate progression with microtransactions.

== Criticism ==
Season passes have been criticized for being anti-consumer, as they psychologically pressure customers to spend more money. It is also impossible to know if they are worth buying since they cannot be reviewed until they are released, and the discounts they offer are sometimes offset by poor-quality content that the player would otherwise not have bought. Additionally, if a game performs poorly in the market, the prices of the DLC for it can fall faster than any discount people would have received by immediately buying its season pass.

Andrew Reiner of Game Informer called some season passes "scams coming from money-hungry corporations" because so little information is divulged that consumers can be subject to bait-and-switch tactics, like using a lower-quality studio to develop the content, or delaying the content's release significantly.

GamesRadar+ criticized multiplayer season passes as splitting the community of online games, praising games that had instituted a different model that was more dependent on cosmetic DLC rather than downloadable maps, such as For Honor and Titanfall 2. Shacknews criticized a number of games for having disappointing season passes, such as Evolve and Aliens: Colonial Marines.
