= List of flight simulator video games =

This is an incomplete list of flight simulation video games, including developer, versions, and release dates.

== Released and under development flight simulator ==
Title	Status	Release year	Developer	Publisher	Platform	Mode	Notes	Reference
FS1 Flight Simulator	Discontinued	1979–1980	Sublogic	Sublogic	Apple II, TRS-80	Single-player	1979 published by Sublogic for Apple II, a TRS-80 version followed in 1980. Setting is a flight simulator in the cockpit of a slightly modernized Sopwith Camel. FS1 is the first in a line of simulations from Sublogic which, starting 1982, were also sold by Microsoft as Microsoft Flight Simulator.	
Flight Simulation	Discontinued	1982	Psion	Sinclair Research	ZX81, ZX Spectrum, Timex Sinclair 1000	Single-player	Written by Psion and marketed by Sinclair Research for the ZX81 and ZX Spectrum home computers. In the United States, Timex Sinclair named it The Flight Simulator for the American version of the ZX81, the Timex Sinclair 1000. It was named Flug-Simulation in Germany and Simulador De Vuelo in Spain.	
International Virtual Aviation Organisation (IVAO)	Active	1998	IVAO A.I.S. (non-profit)	IVAO A.I.S.	Cross-platform	Multiplayer	Online network, simulates real-world aviation by linking virtual pilots and air traffic controllers in shared airspace; used alongside flight simulators rather than being a standalone simulator.	
Microsoft Flight Simulator 1.0	Discontinued	1982	Sublogic	Microsoft	IBM PC	Single-player	Flight simulator, released in November 1982 for the IBM PC. It is the first release in the Microsoft Flight Simulator series.	
Flight Simulator II	Discontinued	1983–1987	Sublogic	Sublogic	Apple II, Atari 8-bit, Commodore 64, PC-98, Amiga, Atari ST, Tandy Color Computer 3	Single-player	Written by Bruce Artwick, published by Sublogic as FS1 Flight Simulator sequel; released December 1983 for Apple II.	
Thunder Blade	Discontinued	1987–1989	Sega	Sega	Arcade, Master System, Amiga, Amstrad CPC, Atari ST, Commodore 64, DOS, MSX, TurboGrafx-16, X68000, ZX Spectrum, Nintendo 3DS	Single-player	Third-person shooter combat flight simulator originally released by Sega for arcades in 1987. Players control a helicopter to destroy enemy vehicles. It was released as a standard stand-up arcade cabinet with force feedback, as the joystick vibrates. A helicopter shaped sit-down model was released, replacing the force feedback with a cockpit seat that moves in tandem with the joystick. It is a motion simulator cabinet, like the prior Sega Super Scaler games Space Harrier (1985) and After Burner (1987). The plot and setting are inspired by the film Blue Thunder (1983).	
Air Warrior	Discontinued	1988	Kesmai	Konami	Windows, 3DO, Amiga, Atari ST, CDTV, FM Towns, Mac OS	Single-player, Multiplayer	Multiplayer online combat flight simulation game. Was one of the first massive online games, hosting hundreds of users during busy periods.	
Super Thunder Blade	Discontinued	1988–1990	Sega	Sega	Mega Drive/Genesis, PlayStation 2, PlayStation Portable, Virtual Console	Single-player	Combat flight simulation shooter game developed and published by Sega for Mega Drive/Genesis console. It was one of the two launch titles for the console in Japan (the other is Space Harrier II), and one of six launch titles for the console for its U.S. launch. It is a follow-up to the 1987 arcade game Thunder Blade.	
Air Inferno	Discontinued	1990	Taito	Taito	Arcade game	Single-player	1990 arcade video game developed and released by Taito, in Japan, Europe, and North America. A spin-off from Taito's Landing series, Inferno is an aerial firefighting simulation that involves piloting a helicopter on various rescue missions, shooting a fire extinguisher to extinguish flames while rescuing civilians.	
Red Baron	Discontinued	1990 - 1992	Dynamix	Sierra On Line	DOS, Amiga, macOS	Single-player	Set on the Western Front during World War I; player can engage in single missions or career mode. Player can fly for the German Air Service or Royal Flying Corps, and can find themselves flying as the Red Baron, or encountering him as an enemy over the front.	
Virtual Air Traffic Simulation Network (VATSIM)	Active	2001	VATSIM Inc. (non-profit)	VATSIM Inc.	Cross-platform	Multiplayer	Global online network links virtual pilots and air traffic controllers in shared simulated airspace using compatible flight simulators.	
Flight Assignment: A.T.P.	Discontinued	1990	Sublogic	Sublogic	DOS	Single-player	Amateur flight simulator released in 1990 by Sublogic Corporation; runs on DOS based PCs. It models being an airline transport pilot (ATP) for a Boeing 737, 747, 767, Airbus A320, and Shorts 360. It features most major aviation radio beacons in the United States and about 30 major airports, and includes a multi-voice air traffic control simulator.	
Falcon 3.0	Discontinued	1991	Sphere Inc.	Spectrum HoloByte, MicroProse	DOS	Single-player, multiplayer	Combat flight simulator developed by Sphere Inc. and published by Spectrum HoloByte in 1991 as third official main entry in the Falcon series of the F-16 Fighting Falcon simulators.	
Warbirds	Discontinued	1991	Atari Corporation	Atari Corporation	Atari Lynx	Single-player, multiplayer	1991 first-person Combat flight simulator developed and published by Atari Corporation in North America and Europe exclusively for the Atari Lynx. Set in the 1910s during World War I, players assume the role of a rookie aircraft pilot from the Army Air Force who joined the titular squadron taking control of a prebuilt biplane to win the war against the enemies. Gameplay consists of mainly dogfights against either AI-controlled opponents or other human players using the Lynx's ComLynx system, with a main four-button layout.	
Steel Talons	Discontinued	1991–1992	Atari Games	Atari Games	Arcade, Atari Falcon, Lynx, Genesis, SNES	Single-player, multiplayer	3D combat flight simulator arcade game released by Atari Games in 1991; player takes the role of a pilot for an "AT1196 Steel Talons combat helicopter"; was ported to Sega Genesis, Atari Lynx, Atari ST, and Super Nintendo Entertainment System. Jaguar port was announced, but unreleased.	
A320 Airbus	Discontinued	1991–1993	Thalion Software	Thalion Software	Amiga, Atari ST, DOS	Single player	Released 1991; player pilots an Airbus A320; developed over three years with cooperation from Lufthansa, Deutsche Airbus, and Jeppesen; written by Rainer Bopf for Amiga and ported to Atari ST by Christian Jungen; newest version is 1.44.	
Gunship 2000	Discontinued	1991–1996	MicroProse	MicroProse	DOS, Amiga, PC-98, Amiga CD32, PlayStation	Single player	helicopter combat flight simulation video game developed and published by MicroProse as a follow-up to their earlier game Gunship. It was originally released in 1991 for DOS; this version received an expansion in 1992. The Amiga, PC-98, Amiga CD32 and PlayStation versions were released in 1993, 1994 and 1996 respectively (the PlayStation version was retitled as simply Gunship, but was sometimes still referred to as Gunship 2000).	
1942: The Pacific Air War	Discontinued	1994	MPS Labs	MicroProse	DOS	Single-player, multiplayer	Combat flight simulation based on the U.S. and Japanese Pacific War conflict from 1942 to 1945.	
Fleet Defender	Discontinued	1994–1995	MicroProse	MicroProse	DOS, PC-98	Single-player	combat flight simulator published by MicroProse in 1994; uses the F-14B version of the F-14 Tomcat even where anachronistic because the developers found the original, underpowered F-14A unforgiving and "not much fun" in an entertainment flight simulator. An expansion pack, Fleet Defender: Scenario, and a port for the PC-98 were released in 1995.	
Flight Unlimited	Discontinued	1995	LookingGlass Technologies	LookingGlass Technologies	DOS, Windows 95, Macintosh	Single-player	1995 aerobatics simulator developed and published by LookingGlass Technologies. Lets players pilot versions of real-world fixed-wing aircraft and perform aerobatic maneuvers. They may fly freely, race through floating rings against a timer or take lessons from a virtual flight instructor, who teaches basic and advanced maneuvers, ranging from rudder turns to the tailslide, Lomcovák, and Immelmann turn.	
Wings of Glory	Discontinued	1995	Origin Systems	Electronic Arts	DOS	Single-player	Player must take part in many missions, which involve taking off, completing objectives, then returning to base. Various planes are available, from Sopwith Pup to more advanced types. In Gauntlet mode, player must survive as long as possible.	
SimCopter	Discontinued	1996	Maxis	Maxis	Windows	Single-player	1996 game developed by Maxis; puts player in a 3D city. Like Streets of SimCity, SimCopter lets user import SimCity 2000 maps.	
FlightGear	Active	1997	FlightGear developers & contributors	FlightGear developers & contributors	Cross-platform	Single-player, multiplayer	FlightGear is an atmospheric and orbital flight simulator used in aerospace research and industry. Its flight dynamics engine (JSBSim) is used in a 2015 NASA benchmark to judge new simulation code to the standards of the space industry.	
Flight Unlimited II	Discontinued	1997	Looking Glass Studios	Eidos Interactive	Windows 95	Single-player	Flight Unlimited II is a 1997 game developed by Looking Glass Studios, published by Eidos Interactive; player controls one of five planes in the airspace of the San Francisco Bay Area, which is shared with up to 600 artificially intelligent aircraft directed by real-time air traffic control. The game eschews the aerobatics focus of its predecessor, Flight Unlimited, in favor of civilian general aviation. As such, new physics code and a game engine were developed, the former because the programmer of Flight Unlimited's computational fluid dynamics system, Seamus Blackley, had left the company.	
F-22 Raptor (video game)	Active	1997	Novalogic	Novalogic	Windows	Single player, multiplayer	Combat flight simulation game released by Novalogic in 1997.	
Sabre Ace: Conflict Over Korea	Discontinued	1997	Eagle Interactive	Virgin Interactive	Windows	Single-player	1997 game with Korean War era jet fighters and piston-engine aircraft.	
Falcon 4.0	Discontinued	1998	MicroProse Alameda	Hasbro Interactive	Windows, macOS	Single-player, multiplayer	Combat flight simulation game developed by MicroProse and published by Hasbro Interactive in 1998; based on realistic simulation of Block 50/52 F-16 Fighting Falcon jet fighter in a full-scale modern war set in the Korean Peninsula. A dynamic campaign engine runs autonomously.	
Enemy Engaged: Apache vs Havoc	Discontinued	1998	Razorworks	Empire Interactive	Windows	Single-player	1998 featuring two fully simulated combat helicopters: the US AH64D Apache Longbow and Russian Mil-28N Havoc B.	
AeroWings	Discontinued	1999	CRI Middleware	CRI Middleware, Crave Entertainment	Dreamcast	Single-player, multiplayer	For Sega Dreamcast video game console; player can train with squads, learn how to handle aircraft, and do tricks after mastering different stunts.	
Flight Unlimited III	Discontinued	1999	Looking Glass Studios	Electronic Arts	Windows	Single-player	1999 game developed by Looking Glass Studios and published by Electronic Arts. Players pilot simulations of real-world commercial and civilian aircraft in and around Seattle, Washington, and can fly freely or engage in "Challenge" missions, such as thwarting a theft or finding Bigfoot. The development team built on the general aviation gameplay of Flight Unlimited II, with more detailed physics and terrain, more planes, and a real-time weather system. Roughly half of Flight Unlimited II's team returned to work on the sequel, supported by new hires.	
Fly!	Discontinued	1999	Terminal Reality	Gathering of Developers	Windows, Macintosh	Single-player	Amateur flight simulator for Windows and Macintosh developed by Terminal Reality, published by Gathering of Developers.	
YSFlight	Active	1999	Soji Yamakawa	Soji Yamakawa	Windows, Linux, macOS	Single-player	Freeware flight simulation game for Windows, macOS, and Linux operating systems such as Ubuntu.	
Microsoft Flight Simulator 2002	Discontinued	2001	Microsoft	Microsoft	Windows	Single-player, Multiplayer	Released in October 2001, and is the 8th installment of the Microsoft Flight Simulator video game series. A version called Professional Edition was released at the same time as standard edition that added two aircraft, a flight instructor feature, and an editor to create buildings and aircraft.	
Jane's Attack Squadron	Discontinued	2002	Looking Glass Studios, Mad Doc Software	Xicat Interactive	Windows	Single-player, Multiplayer	2002 Combat flight simulation game developed by Looking Glass Studios and Mad Doc Software, published by Xicat Interactive. Based on World War II, the game lets players pilot 15 versions of that era's military aircraft and fly missions for Axis or Allies. It focuses mainly on air-to-ground combat, hence the title, but contains dogfights.	
Microsoft Flight Simulator 2004: A Century of Flight	Discontinued	2003	Microsoft Game Studios	Microsoft Game Studios	Windows	Single-player, Multiplayer	Released in 2003; part of Microsoft Flight Simulator series; the last version to support Windows 98/9x series of operating systems.	
Falcon 4.0: Allied Force (F4AF)	Discontinued	2005	Lead Pursuit	Graphsim Entertainment	Windows, Mac (OS X)	Single-player, Multiplayer	F-16 based combat flight simulator released by Lead Pursuit in 2005; based on a realistic simulation of the Block 50/52 F-16 in a series of missions in the Balkans.	
Microsoft Flight Simulator X	Discontinued	2006–2014	Aces Game Studio	Xbox Game Studios	Windows	Single-player, Multiplayer	Microsoft Flight Simulator 2004 sequel and tenth installment of Microsoft Flight Simulator series, which was first released in 1982. It is built on an upgraded graphics rendering engine, showcasing DirectX 10 features in Windows Vista and was marketed by Microsoft as the most important technological milestone in the series at the time. FSX is the first version in the series to be released on DVD media.	
Digital Combat Simulator	Active	2008–2009	Eagle Dynamics	The Fighter Collection	Windows	Single-player, Multiplayer	Free-to-play game that includes two free aircraft and two free maps. Modules are downloadable content that expand the game with add-on aircraft, maps, and other content. Campaigns are scripted sets of missions. Modules and campaigns are produced by Eagle Dynamics as well as third-parties.	
Rise of Flight: The First Great Air War	Discontinued	2009	Neoqb, 777 Studios	777 Studios, Aerosoft, ND Games	Windows	Single-player, Multiplayer	A World War I combat flight simulation by Russian developer 777 Studios and released May 7, 2009.	
IL-2 Sturmovik: Birds of Prey	Discontinued	2009–2010	Gaijin Entertainment, DiP Interactive, SME Dynamic Systems Ltd.	505 Games, 1C Company	PlayStation 3, Xbox 360, Windows, Nintendo DS, PlayStation Portable	Single-player	Or Wings of Prey on Windows, is a combat flight simulation. As with prior installments of the series IL-2 Sturmovik, it depicts combat aircraft from World War II, although with less focus on realistic simulation than other entries in the series. The game has a campaign mode in which players can fly the Allies against the Axis, and also a multiplayer mode in which they can select either faction.	
Prepar3D	Active	2010	Lockheed Martin	Lockheed Martin	Windows	Single-player, Multiplayer	Professional-grade simulation platform developed by Lockheed Martin, originally derived from Microsoft ESP (itself based on Microsoft Flight Simulator X). Widely used in military, academic, and commercial aviation training environments. Supports a large ecosystem of third-party add-ons, many of which are also compatible with FSX.	
GeoFS	Active	2010	Xavier Tassin	Xavier Tassin	Web platform, Android, iOS	Multiplayer	The game features a variety of planes including aircraft contributed from the community. The game also features multiplayer environment for pilots to interact with each other. In Q4 2018, the GeoFS app was released for both Android and iOS devices. GeoFS on mobile features the Original, as well as a Lite app.	
Infinite Flight	Active	2011	Infinite Flight LLC	Infinite Flight LLC	Android, iOS	Single-player, multiplayer	An amateur flight simulator developed by Infinite Flight LLC. The game is available for Android and iOS. The simulator includes single-player and multi-player modes, including an option to play as air traffic control. As a mobile game, Infinite Flight relies on the device's accelerometer for flight control.	
Air Mail	Active	2012	Chillingo	Chillingo	iOS	Single-player	Developed by British studio Chillingo Ltd, released May 24, 2012.	
Wings Over Flanders Fields Between Heaven and Hell II	Active	2013 - 2023	OBD Software	OBD Software	Windows	Single-player	Set on the Western Front during World War I; player can engage in a dynamic career mode with uniquely generated missions, or Quick Combat missions, or pre-set Scenarios, and can choose to fly for the German Air Service, Royal Flying Corps, French Air Force, or US Army Air Service.	
War Thunder	Active	2013	Gaijin Entertainment	Gaijin Entertainment	Windows, macOS, Linux, PlayStation 4, PlayStation 5, Xbox One, Xbox Series X/S	Multiplayer	Free-to-play vehicular combat massively multiplayer online game featuring aircraft, ground vehicles, and naval craft spanning multiple eras. Includes a dedicated Simulator Battle mode offering realistic cockpit-view flight with no HUD assists and full realistic flight models. Covers aircraft from the 1930s through the modern jet era across hundreds of flyable planes. Also available on PlayStation 4, PlayStation 5, Xbox One, and Xbox Series X/S.	
World of Warplanes	Active	2013	Persha Studia	Wargaming	Windows	Multiplayer	Free-to-play aerial combat massively multiplayer online game (MMO) developed by Persha Studia and published by Wargaming.net.	
Ace Combat Infinity	Discontinued	2014	Project Aces	Bandai Namco Games	PlayStation 3	Single-player, multiplayer	Free-to-play combat flight simulation video game. Sixteenth title in the Ace Combat series.	
SimplePlanes	Active	2014–2015	Jundroo LLC	Jundroo LLC	iOS, Android, macOS, Windows	Single-player, Multiplayer (with mod)	The game includes a builder with various parts, engines and mechanical gizmos. On the website, there are shared builds and mods created by the community surrounding SimplePlanes. There are also forums, where community members can communicate with others, as well as help one another.	
X-Plane 11	Active	2016	Laminar Research	Laminar Research	Android, iOS, Linux, macOS, WebOS, Windows	Single-player, Multiplayer	X-Plane latest simulation series.	
Aerofly FS	Active	2017	IPACS	IPACS	Windows, macOS, iOS, Android	Single-player, Multiplayer	One of the realistic Flight Simulator. Has 25 aircraft and worldwide scenery for player to play. The flight simulator can run on PC, mobile device, and VR.	
Condor 2: Soaring Simulator	Active	2017	LRT d.o.o.	LRT d.o.o.	Windows	Single-player, Multiplayer	Dedicated glider and sailplane simulator focused on thermal and ridge soaring. Features realistic atmospheric and aerological modeling, accurate terrain for multiple European and North American regions, and an active online multiplayer soaring community. Considered one of the most accurate soaring simulators available.	
VTOL VR	Active	2017	Boundless Dynamics, LLC	Boundless Dynamics, LLC	Valve Index, HTC Vive, Oculus Rift, Windows Mixed Reality	Single-player, Multiplayer	A military-focused VR flight simulator. The game currently has six aircraft; four jet fighters, one tilt-jet VTOL, and a helicopter. Players control their aircraft by flipping switches, pressing buttons, and using the virtual throttle and joystick in the cockpit. Players can create custom missions and maps, for upload to the Steam workshop for download and play by others.	
Ace Combat 7: Skies Unknown	Active	2019	Bandai Namco Studios	Bandai Namco Entertainment	Windows, PlayStation 4, Xbox One			
Real Flight Simulator	Active	2019	RORTOS	RORTOS	Android, iOS	Single-player, multiplayer	Multiple Playable Aircraft with ATC control and ATC handling	
Microsoft Flight Simulator 2020	Active	2020	Asobo Studio	Xbox Game Studios	Windows, OpenXR, Xbox Series X/S, Xbox Cloud Gaming	Single-player, Multiplayer	Flight Simulator simulates the topography of the entire Earth using data from Bing Maps. Microsoft Azure's artificial intelligence (AI) generates the three-dimensional representations of Earth's features, using its cloud computing to render and enhance visuals, and real-world data to generate real-time weather and effects. Flight Simulator has a physics engine to provide realistic flight control surfaces, with over 1,000 simulated surfaces, as well as realistic wind modelled over hills and mountains. Some places are handcrafted, introduced in region-specific updates.	
Juno: New Origins	Active	2018	Jundroo	Jundroo	Windows, macOS, Android, iOS	Single-player	3D aerospace sandbox where players can use customizable parts to build and test rockets, planes, cars, or anything they can imagine in an environment with realistic physics across land, sea, air, and space. It entered early access on Steam named SimpleRockets 2 in 2018, and was renamed Juno: New Origins in 2023.	
X-Plane 12	Active	2022	Laminar Research	Laminar Research	Linux, macOS, Windows	Single-player, Multiplayer	X-Plane 11 sequel, released in 2022.	
Flyout	Active	2023	Stonext Games	Stonext Games	Windows	Single-player	Player can design an airplane, then fly it	
Nuclear Option	Active	2023	Shockfront Studios	Shockfront Studios	Windows	Single-player, Multiplayer	Fly near-future combat aircraft against AI or other players in user-created missions. As play advances, players unlock more powerful weapons, eventually to tactical and strategic yield nuclear bombs.	
Microsoft Flight Simulator 2024	Active	2024	Asobo Studio	Xbox Game Studios	Windows, Xbox Series X/S	Single-player	Flight Simulator 2020 sequel; includes career mode.	
Ukrainian Fight Drone Simulator	Active	2025	Simtech Solutions	Simtech Solutions	Windows	Single-player, Multiplayer	Publicly released version of software used to train Ukrainian Armed Forces on drone flight.	
SimplePlanes 2	In development	2026	Jundroo	Jundroo	Windows, macOS	Single-player, Multiplayer	SimplePlanes sequel; in development, planned release on Steam on 23 April 2026, with mobile releases in 2026 or 2027.	
Wings Simulations FS 2027	In development	2027	Wings Simulations	Wings Simulations	Windows, Linux (planned), macOS (planned)	Single-player, Multiplayer	Successor to the original Wings Simulations Flight Sim, which served over 200,000 pilots. Built on a completely new custom engine; features 42,000 airports worldwide, photorealistic volumetric weather, career progression, an integrated aircraft editor, and unlimited concurrent multiplayer. Planned launch on Steam in 2027 at a price of $15 USD. Minimum specs target accessibility, requiring only a GTX 1650 or equivalent GPU.	

== Flight simulator series ==
Title	Status	Year Active	Developer	Publisher	Platform	First Release	Latest Release	Notes	Reference
Microsoft Flight Simulator	Active	1982–present	Sublogic, Bruce Artwick Organization, Aces Game Studio, Dovetail Games, Asobo Studio	Microsoft, Xbox Game Studios, Dovetail Games	DOS, Classic Mac OS, PC-98, Windows, Xbox Series X/S, Xbox Cloud Gaming	Microsoft Flight Simulator November 1982; 39 years ago November 1982	Microsoft Flight Simulator November 19, 2024; 7 months ago November 19, 2024	Series of amateur flight simulator programs for Microsoft Windows operating systems, and earlier for MS-DOS and Classic Mac OS. It is one of the longest-running, best-known, and most comprehensive home flight simulator programs on the market. It was an early product in the Microsoft application portfolio and differed significantly from Microsoft's other software, which was largely business-oriented. At 39 years old, it is the longest-running software product line for Microsoft, predating Windows by three years. Microsoft Flight Simulator is one of the longest-running PC video game series of all time.	
Landing (series)	Discontinued	1987–1999	Taito	Taito	Arcade game, PlayStation, PlayStation 2, PlayStation Portable, Game Boy Color	Midnight Landing 1987	Landing High Japan 1999	Landing is a series of flight simulator video games by Taito. Almost all games were released for arcades, except the Jet de Go! series released for PlayStation consoles. They are amateur flight simulation arcade video games that run on the Taito Air System and use 3D polygon graphics. They simulate commercial airliners, while utilizing motion simulator cockpit arcade cabinets. Air Inferno (1990) is a spin-off 3D aerial firefighting helicopter simulation running on the same hardware.	
Wing Commander (franchise)	Discontinued	1990 - 2007	Origin Systems	Origin Systems, Electronic Arts	MS-DOS, Amiga, Amiga CD32, Sega CD, Windows, FM Towns, Super Nintendo Entertainment System, 3DO Interactive Multiplayer, MacOS, PlayStation Portable	Wing Commander September 1990	Wing Commander Arena July 25, 2007	Wing Commander is a series of combat flight simulator developed by Origin System and published by EA	
Ace Combat	Active	1995–present	Namco, Bandai Namco Studios, Access Games	Namco, Bandai Namco Entertainment	PlayStation, PlayStation 2, Game Boy Advance, Mobile phone, Xbox 360, Nintendo 3DS, PlayStation 3, PlayStation Portable, PC, iOS, Xbox One, PlayStation 4	Air CombatJune 30, 1995	Ace Combat 7: Skies Unknown January 18, 2019 January 18, 2019	Arcade-style combat flight simulation video game franchise published by Bandai Namco Entertainment, formerly Namco. Debuting in 1995 with Air Combat for the PlayStation, the series includes eight mainline installments, multiple spin-offs, and other forms of media, such as novels, model kits, and soundtrack albums. Since 2012, the series has been developed primarily by Bandai Namco Studios through its internal development group, Project Aces.	
X-Plane	Active	1995–present	Laminar Research, Austin Meyer	Laminar Research, Aerosoft	Android, iOS, Linux, macOS, WebOS, Microsoft Windows	X-Plane 1.00 1995	X-Plane 12.06 September 15, 2023	Flight simulation engine series developed and published by Laminar Research since 1995. Commercial desktop versions are sold for macOS, Windows, and Linux, although Laminar Research also distributes FAA-certified versions for professional use. A mobile version is available for Android, iOS, and webOS since 2009 as well.	
WarBirds (video game series)	Discontinued	1995–2008	Interactive Creations of Grapevine	iEntertainment Network	Microsoft Windows, MacOS	WarBirds 1995	WarBirds 2008 2008	WarBirds is a series of massively multiplayer online and offline World War II combat flight simulation video games originally developed by Interactive Creations of Grapevine and published by iEntertainment Network in 1995. The game includes an air combat flight simulator as well as a simulator for tanks and other ground vehicles and inspired a fan cult and conventions, and a book titled WarBirds: The Story So Far.	
Fighter Ace	Discontinued	1997–2002	VR-1 Russia, BST Soft	Microsoft, VR-1, Ketsujin Studios	Microsoft Windows	Fighter Ace/Air Attack 31 December 1997;	Fighter Ace 3 2002	Fighter Ace was a massively multiplayer online combat flight simulation game series in which one flies World War II fighter planes in combat against other players and virtual pilots. Each of the games ran on a subscription-based model with players paying monthly to compete against each other. Microsoft, as well as later publishers, hosted tournaments in which players could compete against each other.	
IL-2 Sturmovik (series)	Active	2001–present	1C:Maddox Games, Team Fusion Simulations, 1C Game Studios	1C, Ubisoft	Microsoft Windows	IL-2 Sturmovik November 18, 2001	L-2 Sturmovik: Great Battles November 19, 2013	IL-2 Sturmovik (Russian: Ил-2 Штурмовик) is a series of World War II combat flight simulation video games originally created in 2001 by Russian video game developer Maddox Games under the brand name 1C:Maddox Games, following its association with 1C Company. Maddox Games left 1C Company in 2011. Since 2012, 1C's new developers are 1C Game Studios (who develops the Great Battles series of simulation games) and Team Fusion Simulations (who develops the Dover series of simulation games). Thus, 1C Company currently owns the IL-2 Sturmovik label and runs three different accumulated generations of IL-2 games (three generations of IL-2 games have been established as three different game engine stages have been developed since 2001).	

== Notes ==
- A flight simulator series is flagged as discontinued if the last series is released 10 years ago or last update is released 5 years ago
- Falcon 4.0 is flagged as discontinued because its main developer is no longer maintaining it
