= List of Microsoft games: 1979–2000 =

This is a list of games that were published by Microsoft from 1979 to 2000 before the foundation of Microsoft Games division, now known as Xbox Game Studios.

== List ==
Title	Platform(s)	Release date	Developer(s)	Ref(s)
Microsoft Adventure	TRS-80	1979	Softwin Associates	
Olympic Decathlon	TRS-80	1980	Timothy W. Smith	
Microsoft Adventure	Apple II	1981	Softwin Associates	
Olympic Decathlon	Apple II	1981	Timothy W. Smith	
DONKEY.BAS	PC DOS	August 1981	Bill Gates, Neil Konzen	
Microsoft Flight Simulator 1.0	Self-booting disk	1982	Sublogic	
Microsoft Flight Simulator 2.0	Self-booting disk	May 1984	Sublogic	
Microsoft Flight Simulator	Classic Mac OS	May 1986	Sublogic	
Microsoft Flight Simulator 3.0	MS-DOS	1988	Sublogic	
Microsoft Flight Simulator 4.0	MS-DOS	1989	The Bruce Artwick Organization	
Chip's Challenge	Windows	1991	Microsoft	
Gorillas	MS-DOS	1991	Microsoft	
Nibbles	MS-DOS	1991	Rick Raddatz	
Pipe Dream	Windows	1991	Microsoft	
Rattler Race	Windows	1991	Microsoft	
JezzBall	Windows	1992	Marjacq Micro	
Microsoft Golf	Windows	1992	Access Software	
Microsoft Arcade	Windows	1993	Microsoft	
Microsoft Flight Simulator 5.0	Windows	1993	The Bruce Artwick Organization	
Gahan Wilson's The Ultimate Haunted House	Classic Mac OS	1994	Brooklyn Multimedia	
Gahan Wilson's The Ultimate Haunted House	Windows	1994	Brooklyn Multimedia	
Microsoft Arcade	Classic Mac OS	1994	Microsoft	
Microsoft Space Simulator	MS-DOS	1994	The Bruce Artwick Organization	
Scholastic's The Magic School Bus Explores the Human Body	Classic Mac OS	1994	Music Pen	
Scholastic's The Magic School Bus Explores the Human Body	Windows	1994	Music Pen	
Scholastic's The Magic School Bus Explores the Solar System	Windows	1994	Lobotomy Software	
Minesweeper	Windows	August 24, 1995	Microsoft	
Hover!	Windows	August 1995	Microsoft	
Scholastic's The Magic School Bus Explores the Ocean	Windows	October 24, 1995	Music Pen	
Fury³	Windows	1995	Terminal Reality	
Microsoft Flight Simulator 5.1	Windows	1995	The Bruce Artwick Organization	
Microsoft Golf 2.0	Windows	1995	Access Software	
Microsoft Solitaire	Windows	1995	Microsoft Casual Games	
Deadly Tide	Windows	October 3, 1996	Rainbow Studios	
Hellbender	Windows	October 3, 1996	Terminal Reality	
Monster Truck Madness	Windows	October 3, 1996	Terminal Reality	
NBA Full Court Press	Windows	October 3, 1996	Beam Software	
Scholastic's The Magic School Bus Explores in the Age of Dinosaurs	Windows	October 9, 1996	Music Pen	
Gex	Windows	November 7, 1996	Kinesoft	
Microsoft Flight Simulator for Windows 95	Windows	November 7, 1996	Microsoft	
Microsoft Golf 3.0	Windows	November 7, 1996	Access Games	
Microsoft Soccer	Windows	November 7, 1996	Lobotomy Software	
NetWits	Windows	December 17, 1996	R/Greenberg Associates	
Beyond the Limit: Ultimate Climb	Windows	1996	Magnet Interactive Studios	
Close Combat	Classic Mac OS	1996	Atomic Games	
Close Combat	Windows	1996	Atomic Games	
Goosebumps: Escape from Horrorland	Windows	1996	DreamWorks Interactive	
Microsoft Return of Arcade	Windows	1996	Microsoft	
Scholastic's The Magic School Bus Explores the Ocean	Classic Mac OS	1996	Music Pen	
Someone's in the Kitchen!	Windows	1996	DreamWorks Interactive	
The Neverhood	Windows	1996	The Neverhood	
Scholastic's The Magic School Bus Explores the Rainforest	Windows	May 1997	Music Pen	
Age of Empires	Windows	October 15, 1997	Ensemble Studios	
CART Precision Racing	Windows	December 1, 1997	Terminal Reality	
Battle Arena Toshinden 2	Windows	1997	Kinesoft	
Close Combat: A Bridge Too Far	Classic Mac OS	1997	Atomic Games	
Close Combat: A Bridge Too Far	Windows	1997	Atomic Games	
Dilbert's Desktop Games	Windows	1997	Cyclops Software	
Goosebumps: Attack of the Mutant	Windows	1997	BlueSky Software	
Microsoft Entertainment Pack: The Puzzle Collection	Windows	1997	Microsoft	
Microsoft Flight Simulator 98	Windows	1997	Microsoft	
Barney Under the Sea	Windows	April 1998	7th Level	
Monster Truck Madness 2	Windows	May 12, 1998	Terminal Reality	
Microsoft Baseball 3D 1998 Edition	Windows	May 31, 1998	Wizbang!	
Motocross Madness	Windows	August 14, 1998	Rainbow Studios	
Urban Assault	Windows	September 15, 1998	TerraTools	
Microsoft Combat Flight Simulator: WWII Europe Series	Windows	November 5, 1998	Microsoft	
Arthur's Math Carnival	Windows	1998	ImageBuilder Software	
Barney's Fun on Imagination Island	Windows	1998	7th Level	
Microsoft Golf 1998 Edition	Windows	1998	Friendly Software	
Microsoft Pinball Arcade	Windows	1998	Mir Dialogue	
Microsoft Revenge of Arcade	Windows	1998	Microsoft	
Microsoft Spider Solitaire	Windows	1998	Microsoft	
Outwars	Windows	1998	SingleTrac Entertainment	
Close Combat III: The Russian Front	Windows	January 15, 1999	Atomic Games	
Midtown Madness	Windows	May 27, 1999	Angel Studios	
Links Extreme	Windows	June 15, 1999	Access Software	
Pandora's Box	Windows	September 19, 1999	Microsoft	
Age of Empires II: The Age of Kings	Windows	September 27, 1999	Ensemble Studios	
Links LS 2000	Windows	October 27, 1999	Access Software	
Asheron's Call	Windows	October 31, 1999	Turbine Entertainment	
Microsoft Baseball 2000	Windows	1999	Wizbang!	
Microsoft Flight Simulator 2000	Windows	1999	Microsoft	
Microsoft International Soccer 2000	Windows	1999	Rage Games	
NBA Inside Drive 2000	Windows	1999	High Voltage Software	
Allegiance	Windows	March 16, 2000	Microsoft Research Games	
The Magic School Bus Explores Bugs	Windows	March 30, 2000	KnowWonder	
The Magic School Bus Explores Bugs	Classic Mac OS	March 2000	KnowWonder	
Starlancer	Windows	April 27, 2000	Warthog, Digital Anvil	
Motocross Madness 2	Windows	May 25, 2000	Rainbow Studios	
Magic School Bus in Concert	Windows	July 18, 2000	KnowWonder	
Magic School Bus Lands on Mars	Windows	July 28, 2000	KnowWonder	
Crimson Skies	Windows	September 18, 2000	Zipper Interactive	
Midtown Madness 2	Windows	September 22, 2000	Angel Studios	
Microsoft Combat Flight Simulator 2: WWII Pacific Theater	Windows	October 13, 2000	Microsoft	
Links LS Classic	Windows	November 17, 2000	Access Software	
MechWarrior 4: Vengeance	Windows	November 24, 2000	FASA Studio	
Microsoft Classic Board Games	Windows	November 29, 2000	Oxford Softworks	
Magic School Bus in Concert	Classic Mac OS	2000	KnowWonder	
Magic School Bus Lands on Mars	Classic Mac OS	2000	KnowWonder	
Metal Gear Solid	Windows	2000	Digital Dialect	
Microsoft Baseball 2001	Windows	2000	Microsoft	
Microsoft Casino	Windows	2000	Glass Eye Entertainment	
Microsoft Golf 2001 Edition	Windows	2000	Macrovision	
Microsoft Return of Arcade: Anniversary Edition	Windows	2000	Microsoft	

== See also ==
- List of games included with Windows
