= Flight simulator (disambiguation) =

A flight simulator is a device that artificially re-creates aircraft flight and various aspects of the flight environment. Those not for flight training or aircraft development may be referred to as amateur flight simulators.

Flight simulator or flight simulation may also refer to:

Specific flight simulation programs

- FS1 Flight Simulator, Sublogic, 1980
- Flight Simulation (Psion software), 1982, for ZX81, TS-1000, and ZX Spectrum computers (sold as The Flight Simulator in the US)
- Several video games in the Microsoft Flight Simulator series:
  - Microsoft Flight Simulator (1982 video game)
  - Microsoft Flight Simulator 2.0, 1984
  - Microsoft Flight Simulator (1986 video game)
  - Microsoft Flight Simulator 3.0, 1988
  - Microsoft Flight Simulator (2020 video game)
  - Microsoft Flight Simulator 2024

Types of flight simulation software

- Combat flight simulation game, a video game used to simulate military aircraft and their operations
- RC flight simulator, a computer program that allows pilots of radio-controlled aircraft to practice on a computer
- Space flight simulation game, a genre of flight simulator video games that lets players experience space flight

Other

- Full flight simulator, a term used by National (civil) Aviation Authorities (NAA) for a high technical level of Flight simulator

== See also ==
- List of free flight simulators
- List of flight simulation games
