= First-person (video games) =

Graphical perspective in video games

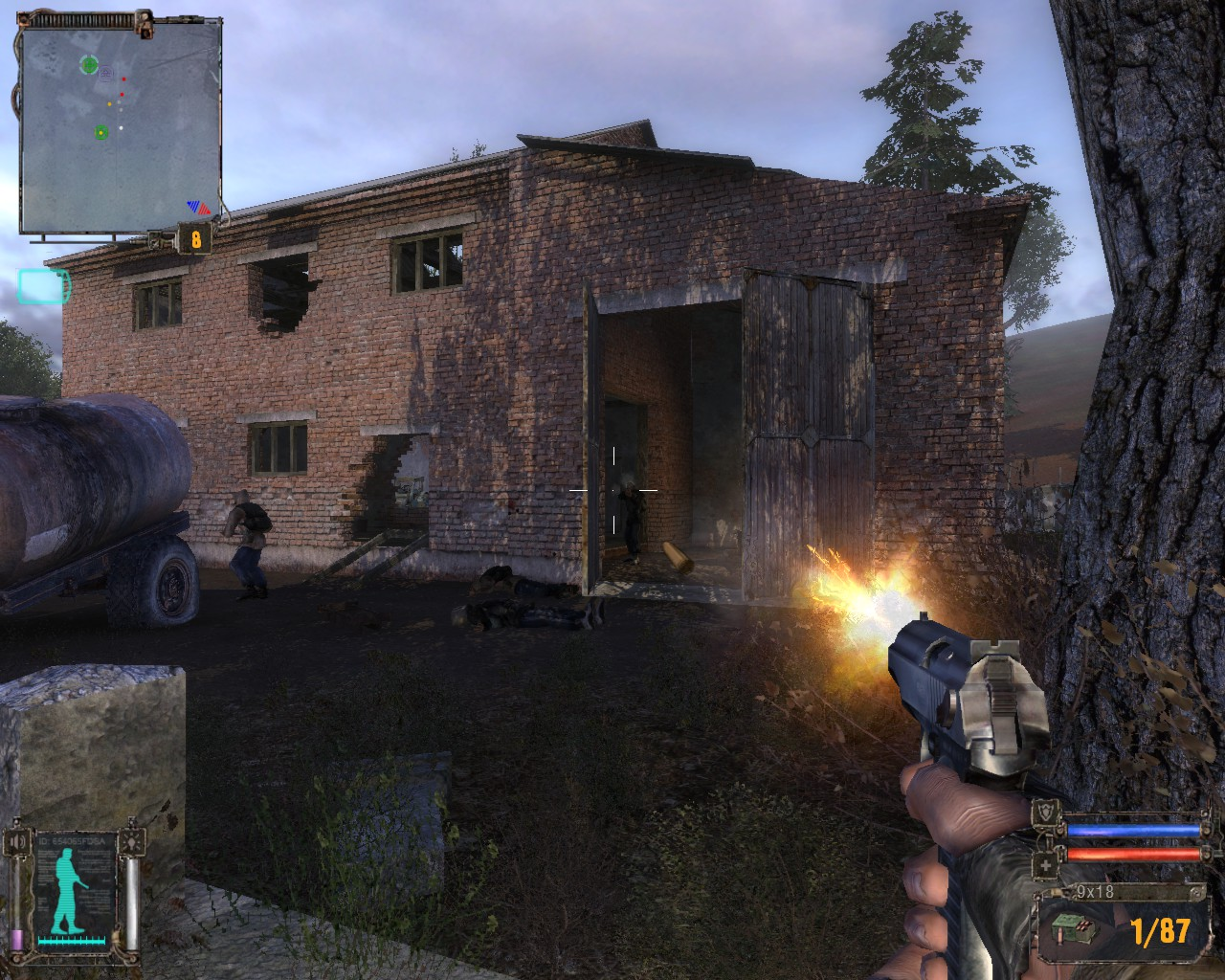
A screenshot from S.T.A.L.K.E.R.: Shadow of Chernobyl; the presence of the player character's right hand firing their gun (bottom right) denotes the first-person perspective.

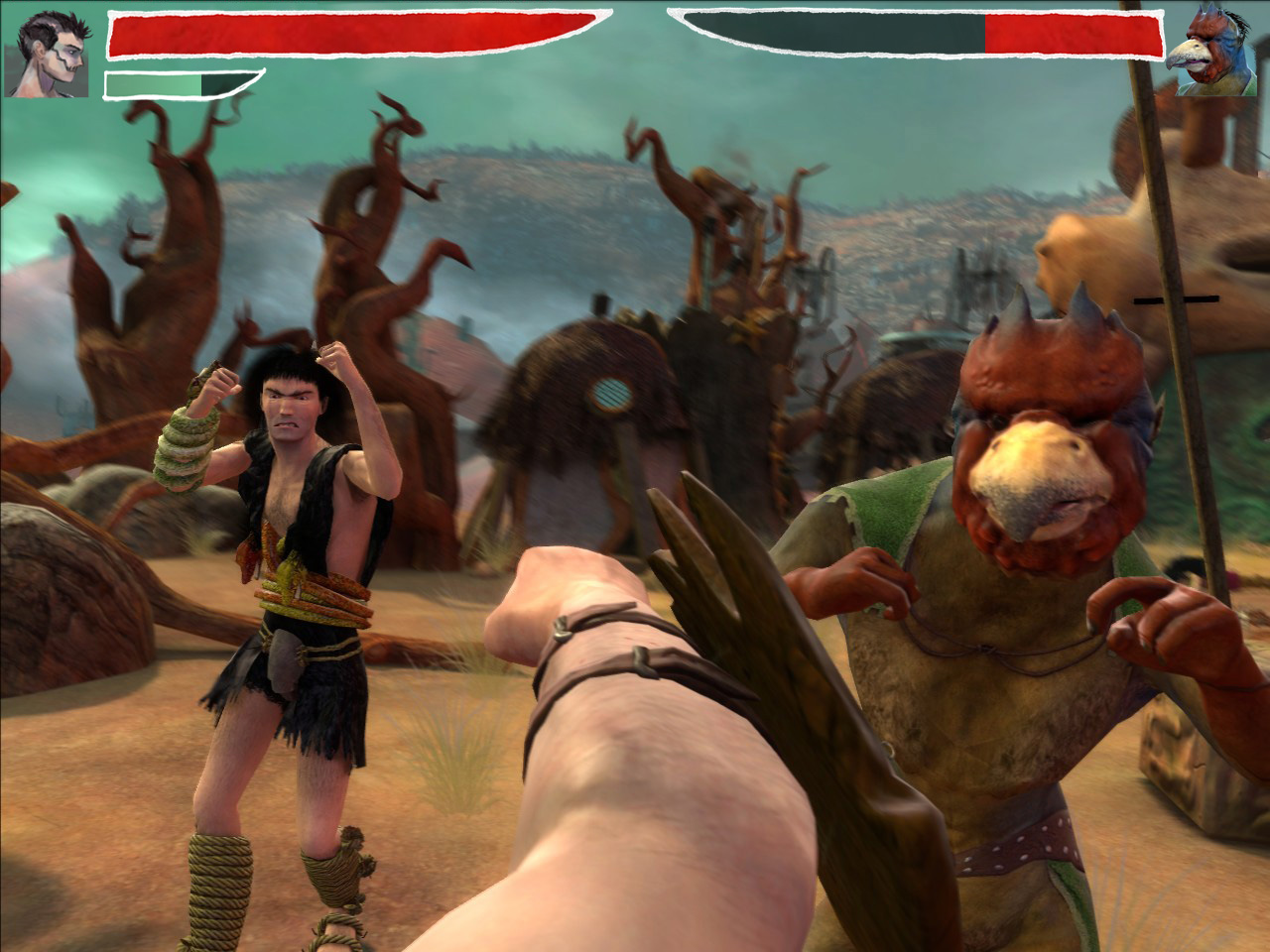
First-person can be used for virtually any genre; Zeno Clash is a beat 'em up in first person, an unusual choice for the genre.

In video games, first-person (also spelled first person) is any graphical perspective rendered from the viewpoint of the player character, or from the inside of a device or vehicle controlled by the player character. It is one of two perspectives used in the vast majority of video games, with the other being third-person, the graphical perspective from outside of any character (but possibly focused on a character); some games such as interactive fiction do not belong to either format.

First-person can be used as sole perspective in games belonging of almost any genre; first-person party-based RPGs and first-person maze games helped define the format throughout the 1980s, while first-person shooters (FPS) are a popular genre emerging in the 1990s in which the graphical perspective is an integral component of the gameplay. Although, like third-person shooters (TPS), the term has come to define a specific subgenre of shooter games rather than any using the perspective, with several shooter games, while belonging to other subgenres, using a first person perspective, such as, traditionally, light gun shooters, rail shooters, and shooting gallery games. Other genres that typically feature a first person perspective include amateur flight simulations, combat flight simulators, dating sims, driving simulators, visual novels, immersive sims, and walking sims, although it has virtually been used in all genres, including survival horror and stealth games, either as main perspective or for specific actions or sections.

== Game mechanics ==
Games with a first-person perspective are usually avatar-based, wherein the game displays what the player's avatar would see with the avatar's own eyes. Thus, players typically in many games they cannot see the avatar's body, though they may be able to see the avatar's weapons or hands. This viewpoint is also frequently used to represent the perspective of a driver within a vehicle, as in flight and racing simulators; it is common to make use of positional audio, where the volume of ambient sounds varies depending on their position with respect to the player's avatar.

Games with a first-person perspective do not require sophisticated animations for the player's avatar, nor do they need to implement a manual or automated camera-control scheme as in third-person perspective. A first-person perspective allows for easier aiming, since there is no representation of the avatar to block the player's view, but the absence of an avatar can make it difficult to master the timing and distances required to jump between platforms, and may cause motion sickness in some players.

Players have come to expect first-person games to accurately scale objects to appropriate sizes, although the key objects such as dropped items or levers may be exaggerated in order to improve their visibility.

== History ==
=== Origins ===
First-person perspectives are used in various different genres, including several distinct sub-genres of shooter games. Shooting gallery games, which evolved from mid-20th-century arcade electro-mechanical games and in turn late-19th-century carnival games, typically employ a first-person perspective where players aim at moving targets on a stationary screen. They in turn evolved into rail shooters, which also typically employ a first-person perspective, but move the player through levels on a fixed path. Rail shooter and shooting gallery games that use light guns are called light gun shooters. The most popular type of game to employ a first-person perspective today is the first-person shooter (FPS), which allows player-guided navigation through a three-dimensional space.

Electro-mechanical racing games had been using first-person perspectives since the late 1960s, dating back to Kasco's Indy 500 (1968) and Chicago Coin's version Speedway (1969). The use of first-person perspectives in driving video games date back to Nürburgring 1 and Atari's Night Driver in 1976.

It is not clear exactly when the earliest FPS video game was created. There are two claimants, Spasim and Maze War. The uncertainty about which was first stems from the lack of any accurate dates for the development of Maze War—even its developer cannot remember exactly. In contrast, the development of Spasim is much better documented and the dates are more certain.

The initial development of Maze War probably occurred in the summer of 1973. A single player traverses a maze of corridors rendered using fixed perspective. Multiplayer capabilities, with players attempting to shoot each other, were probably added later in 1973 (two machines linked via a serial connection) and in the summer of 1974 (fully networked). Spasim was originally developed in the spring of 1974 with a documented debut at the University of Illinois the same year. The game is a rudimentary space flight simulation game with a first-person 3D wireframe view. It allowed online multiplayer over the worldwide university-based PLATO network.

Futurewar (1976) by high-school student Erik K. Witz and Nick Boland, also based on PLATO, is sometimes claimed to be the first true FPS. The game includes a bitmap image of a gun and other armaments that point at the monsters and other players, with the walls rendered as vector lines. Set in A.D. 2020, Futurewar anticipated Doom, although as to Castle Wolfenstein's transition to a futuristic theme, the common PLATO genesis is coincidental. A further PLATO FPS was the tank game Panther, introduced in 1975, generally acknowledged as a precursor to Battlezone.

1979 saw the release of two first-person space combat games: the Exidy arcade game Star Fire and Doug Neubauer's seminal Star Raiders for Atari 8-bit computers. The popularity of Star Raiders resulted in similarly styled games from other developers and for other systems, including Starmaster for the Atari 2600, Space Spartans for Intellivision, and Shadow Hawk One for the Apple II. It went on to influence two major first-person games of the 1990s: Wing Commander and X-Wing.

=== 1980s ===
Atari's 1983 Star Wars arcade game leaned entirely on action rather than tactics, but offered 3D color vector renderings of TIE Fighters and the surface of the Death Star.

Other shooters with a first-person view from the early 1980s include Taito's Space Seeker in 1981, Horizon V for the Apple II the same year, Sega's stereoscopic arcade game SubRoc-3D in 1982, Novagen Software's Encounter in 1983, and EA's Skyfox for the Apple II in 1984.

Flight simulators were a first-person staple for home computers beginning in 1979 with FS1 Flight Simulator from Sublogic and followed up with Flight Simulator II in 1983. MicroProse found a niche with first-person aerial combat games: Hellcat Ace (1982), Spitfire Ace (1982), and F-15 Strike Eagle (1985).

Amidst a flurry of faux-3D first-person maze games where the player is locked into one of four orientations, like Spectre, Muse Software's Escape!, Tunnel Runner, Escape from the Mindmaster, 3D Monster Maze, 3-D Monster Chase, 3-Demon, Phantom Slayer, and Dungeons of Daggorath, came the 1982 release of Paul Edelstein's Wayout from Sirius Software. Not a shooter, it has smooth, arbitrary movement using what was later labeled a raycasting engine, giving it a visual fluidity seen in future games MIDI Maze and Wolfenstein 3D. It was followed in 1983 by the split-screen Capture the Flag, allowing two players at once, and foreshadowing a common gameplay mode for 3D games of the 1990s.

The arrival of the Atari ST and Amiga in 1985, and the Apple IIGS a year later, increased the computing power and graphical capabilities available in consumer-level machines, leading to a new wave of innovation. 1987 saw the release of MIDI Maze, an important transitional game for the genre. Unlike its contemporaries, MIDI Maze used raycasting to speedily draw square corridors. It also offered a networked multiplayer deathmatch (communicating via the computer's MIDI ports). Sublogic's Jet was a major release for the new platforms, as were Starglider and the tank simulator Arcticfox.

In 1987, Taito's Operation Wolf arcade game started the trend of realistic military-themed action shooters, and featured side-scrolling environments and high-quality graphics for the time. It was followed the subsequent year by a sequel, titled Operation Thunderbolt, that introduced a pseudo-3D perspective and the illusion of depth. The success and popularity of these two games led to Sega releasing Line of Fire in 1989, another military combat arcade machine that achieved a further level of realism by implementing a rotating point of view, thus creating the effect of turning corners left and right, in addition to just walking forward.

In 1988, Golgo 13: Top Secret Episode featured first-person shooter levels and included a sniper rifle for assassinating an enemy agent at long range using an unsteady sniper scope. The same year saw the release of Arsys Software's Star Cruiser.

In the late 1980s, interest in 3D first-person driving simulations resulted in games like Test Drive (1987) and Vette! (1989). 1989's Hard Drivin' arcade game from Atari Games was particularly influential, with fast filled-polygon graphics, a mathematical model of how the vehicle components interact, force feedback, and instant replay after crashes. In the following years, two Hard Drivin'-esque MS-DOS games appeared, each including a track editor: Stunt Driver from Spectrum Holobyte (1990) and Stunts from Broderbund (1991).

=== 1990s ===
In 1990, SNK released beat 'em ups with a first-person perspective: the hack & slash game Crossed Swords, and the fighting & shooting game Super Spy. In 1991, Dactyl Nightmare appeared for the Virtuality arcade VR platform, which featured first person deathmatch style games with polygon player avatars. In late 1991, the fledgling id Software released Catacomb 3D, which introduced the concept of showing the player's hand on-screen, strengthening the illusion that the player is viewing the world through the character's eyes.

Taito's Gunbuster was released in arcades in 1992. It features on-foot gameplay and a control scheme where the player moves using an eight-direction joystick and aims using a mounted positional light gun. It allows two-player cooperative gameplay for the mission mode and features a deathmatch mode where two players compete against each other or up to four players compete in two teams.

In 1992, Ultima Underworld: The Stygian Abyss was among the first to feature texture mapped environments, polygonal objects, and basic lighting. The engine was later enhanced for usage in the games Ultima Underworld II: Labyrinth of Worlds and System Shock. Later in 1992, id improved the technology used in Catacomb 3D by adding support for VGA graphics in Wolfenstein 3D. It would be widely imitated in the years to follow, and marked the beginning of many conventions in the genre, including collecting different weapons that can be switched between using the keyboard's number keys, and ammo conservation. 1996 saw the release of The Elder Scrolls II: Daggerfall for MS-DOS by Bethesda Softworks, featuring similar graphics and polygonal structures to other games at the time and furthering the first-person element included in 1994's The Elder Scrolls: Arena, to which it was a sequel.

Doom (1993) refined Wolfenstein 3D's template by adding support for higher resolution, improved textures, variations in height (e.g., stairs and platforms the player's character could climb upon), more intricate level design (Wolfenstein 3D was limited to a grid based system where walls had to be orthogonal to each other, whereas Doom allowed for any inclination) and rudimentary illumination effects such as flickering lights and areas of darkness, creating a far more believable 3D environment than Wolfenstein 3D's levels, all of which had a flat-floor space and corridors. Doom allowed competitive matches between multiple players, termed deathmatches, and the game was responsible for the word's subsequent entry into the video gaming lexicon. Doom has been considered the most important first-person shooter ever made.

The 1995 game Descent used a fully 3D polygonal graphics engine to render opponents, departing from the sprites used by most previous games in the FPS genre. It also escaped the "pure vertical walls" graphical restrictions of earlier games in the genre, and allowed the player six degrees of freedom of movement (up/down, left/right, forward/backward, pitch, roll, and yaw). The Quake series since 1996, and derived titles such as 1998's Half-Life, advanced from Doom with a fully 3D engine allowing players to look from any angle, and helped formalize the mouse and WASD keys combo that has become the standard means of control on personal computers. On consoles meanwhile, games like Halo from 2001, helped define the dual analog stick controls that have become the norm.

== See also ==
- 3D graphics
- First-person shooter engine
- Simulator sickness
- Virtual reality
- Third-person (video games)
