= MSFS =

MSFS may refer to:

- Microsoft Flight Simulator, a series of flight simulator video games.
  - Microsoft Flight Simulator (2024 video game), the 2024 edition of the series.
- Missionaries of St. Francis de Sales, a Catholic religious group

== Graduate degrees ==
- Master of Science in Financial Services, such as from the American College of Financial Services, Bryn Mawr, Pennsylvania
- Master of Science in Foreign Service, in international affairs, such as from the Walsh School of Foreign Service, Georgetown University, Washington D.C.
- Master of Science in Forensic Science, such as from the John Jay College of Criminal Justice at City University of New York
- Master of Science in Financial Management and Information Systems, such as from the University of Maryland University College
