= Flight Simulator II =

Flight Simulator II may refer to one of two flight simulation video games:

- Flight Simulator II, released for the Apple II in 1983 and for the Commodore 64 and Atari 8-bit computers in 1984
- Microsoft Flight Simulator 2.0 for IBM PC compatibles
