= Airfight =

Flight simulator

- Developers: Brand Fortner; Kevin Gorey
- Platform: PLATO IV
- Release: 1974
- Genre: Flight-simulator
- Mode: Multiplayer

Airfight is a 3D multiplayer flight simulation game and first-person shooter developed for the PLATO IV computer system in 1974. It was co-authored by Brand Fortner and Kevin Gorey at the University of Illinois Urbana-Champaign as one of the earliest recreational flight simulator programs as well as among the earliest remote networked, team-based games.

== Gameplay ==
View of the game is presented from the first-person perspective inside of an aircraft cockpit, one of the earliest uses of a heads-up display in video games. The instruments provide necessary information on flight metrics like altitude, G-forces, roll, and pitch as well as a radar screen which displays the locations of enemy aircraft. The opposing teams aim to destroy the enemy aircraft by striking them with missiles, which increases the score of both the team and individual players. The game provides messages if the player is in immediate danger, such as if the aircraft stalls.

At the start of a game of Airfight, a player is asked to select one of two competing teams – Circle Squadron or Triangle Squadron – or a non-combatant team to observe the fight (though they can still crash). Players then choose an aircraft modeled after real military jets including the MIG-21 and the Lockheed F-104. Each fighter possesses differing statistics dealing with weight, wing area, and maximum speed. The plane can be augmented with fuel and missiles commiserate to the available weight of the aircraft. Refueling requires landing safely at an airstrip.

Each user chooses a username – distinct from their PLATO login name – which is displayed when a player crashes or kills another player. Some usernames used by frequent Airfight players became particularly notorious for their skill, but there was no password to limit access to the name so it could be used by others. Airfight also had in-game chat like other multiplayer PLATO games.

The game was coded to run in “background” mode, which used spare clock cycles of the PLATO system to run the game. While the game operated in real-time, users at individual terminals had to use the NEXT key on PLATO to progress the action.

== Development ==
Development of Airfight began after the creation of two prior first-person flight games on PLATO – Spasim by Jim Bowery and Airace by Silas Warner. Spasim was a space flight simulator which pioneered the use of 3D graphics on PLATO and featured up to 32 players competing in an arena-based first-person shooter. Airace was modeled after realistic flight simulators and featured no combat, instead tasking teams to race against each other. Brand Fortner, a physics major at Urbana-Champaign, was impressed by Airace and wanted to develop a combat game with the same realism.

Fortner programmed the game with fellow physics student Kevin Gorey in the TUTOR language used on the PLATO system. Most PLATO games had graphics constructed of individual character sets, but the 3D games on the system were able to draw line-based graphics using the powerful selective erase function enabled by the in-built memory of the plasma screen memory of the PLATO terminals. Fortner added the airplane dashboard to provide more information to players and increase the realism of the program. The program was designated as a “background” game, meaning it utilized freely available system resources and only be played after 10pm at Champaign-Urbana.

The first version of Airfight was released in mid-1974. In 1976, Fortner rewrote the program by himself with upgraded code. It was one of the most popular games on PLATO, competing with the likes of Empire for the most-played action game on the system. Particularly skilled players became legendary over the network with speculation about their identity at any of the many centers of PLATO connection.

== Legacy ==
Along with Spasim, Airfight helped create a legacy of first-person flight simulators on the PLATO system. Most flight simulators created prior to those on PLATO were exclusively limited to high-priced graphics terminals. Games like Airfight were the first experience of many users to three-dimensional graphic as well as multiplayer games.

Flight simulator games subsequently became important hallmark games for mutliplayer networks. The game Dogfight for the SGI series of workstations was among the first flat-shaded polygonal 3D games to feature multiplayer. In 1987, the company Kesmai released Air Warrior over the GEnie timesharing network. This was a breakthrough in the adaptation of multiplayer action games over remote networks. Sierra On-Line featured their Red Baron flight simulator for play over their Sierra Network service.

Airfight has erroneously been listed as an influence on A2/FS-1 Flight Simulator, the first game in the popular Flight Simulator series of games. Creator Bruce Artwick worked at the Aviation Research Lab at Champaign-Urbana on flight simulation programs for graphical terminals. Artwick denied having played any flight simulation games on the PLATO system, though was aware of them.

Brand Fortner later worked for the National Center for Supercomputing Applications (NCSA) run out of the University of Illinois Champaign-Urbana. He was involved in the early stages of the NCSA Mosaic browser for the World Wide Web, then joined the spin-off Spyglass Inc. who commercialized the Mosaic technology.

== See also ==
- Flight simulation video game
- Sublogic
