= UFO (video game) =

1989 video game

- Developer(s): Sublogic
- Publisher(s): Sublogic
- Designer(s): Bruce Artwick; Hugo Feugen
- Platform(s): MS-DOS
- Release: 1989

UFO is a video game for MS-DOS compatible operating systems published in 1989 by Sublogic.

== Gameplay ==
UFO is a game in which the player commands an alien flying saucer looking to harvest the energy released by humans when they experience fear.

== Reception ==
Daniel Hockman reviewed the game for Computer Gaming World, and stated that "the game is unique. There is nothing else like it on the market. If you want something different, can live with polygon cities, and are willing to tackle some truly difficult flight demands you might want to give UFO a try."
