= Night Mission Pinball =

1982 video game

- Developer: Sublogic
- Publisher: Sublogic
- Designer: Bruce Artwick
- Platforms: Apple II, Atari 8-bit, IBM PC, Commodore 64
- Release: May 1982: Apple, Atari; 1983: C64, IBM PC
- Genre: Pinball
- Modes: Single-player, multiplayer

Night Mission Pinball (originally released as Pinball: Night Mission) is a pinball simulation video game published by Sublogic in 1982. It was developed by Bruce Artwick for the Apple II, then ported to the Atari 8-bit computers, Commodore 64, and IBM PC (as a self-booting disk).

== Gameplay ==
Night Mission Pinball simulates a pinball machine. Players can tweak dozens of settings in the simulator, including the number of balls in play, velocity of the balls, strength of the flippers, sensitivity to tilting, bounciness of the surfaces, and gravitational force exerted on the balls. Up to four players can compete for a high score.

The Atari version uses high resolution monochrome graphics.

== Release ==
The game was initially marketed as Pinball and subtitled "Night Mission". The Apple version was released in May 1982. The Commodore 64 version was released in late 1983.

== Reception ==
Robert C. Gray of SoftSide wrote that the IBM PC version's configurability changes pinball from being a game of chance to "a game of intellectual choice". In a PC Magazine review, Corey Sandler called it "a strange combination of game and graduate physics lesson" that could have appeal to tinkerers and those who wish to learn how physics impacts game design. Softline highlighted the Apple version's tweakability as having "a modest educational purpose" and making it "a programmer's tour de force".

Some reviewers compared it to other arcade games released around the same time. John J. Anderson of Video & Arcade Games called the Atari version's realism "obsessive" and praised its configurability, even though one can not design one's own pinball machine, as in the Pinball Construction Set. Computer Games Magazine rated it A+ and called it "the best computerized pinball game", as it has some features missing from the PCS, such as a "tilt" mechanic. Comparing it to Raster Blaster and David's Midnight Magic, Computer Gaming World's reviewers determined that Night Mission had the best ball physics and fastest balls, making it the best choice. Rick Teverbaugh of Electronic Games called it "easily the most complex" of the pinball games released in 1983.
