= Airline Transport Pilot =

Airline Transport Pilot may refer to:

- holder of an airline transport pilot licence
- Flight Assignment: A.T.P., a 1990 amateur flight simulator
