= Jet (video game) =

1985 video game

- IBM PC cover art
- Developer: Sublogic
- Publisher: Sublogic
- Platforms: MS-DOS, Apple II, Atari ST, Amiga, Commodore 64, Macintosh, NEC PC-9801
- Release: 1985: MS-DOS, C64; 1986: Apple II; 1988: Atari ST, Amiga; 1989: Macintosh, NEC
- Genre: Flight simulator
- Mode: Single-player

Jet is a combat flight simulator video game originally published in 1985 by Sublogic. The game was released in 1985 for MS-DOS and the Commodore 64, 1986 for the Apple II, 1988 for the Atari ST and Amiga, and 1989 for the Macintosh and NEC PC-9801.

An updated version called Jet 2.0 was released for MS-DOS in 1987.

== Gameplay ==
Jet is easier to fly than Flight Simulator II, and is compatible with its scenery disks. The player may choose either an F-16 Fighting Falcon for land missions or an F/A-18 Hornet for missions starting at sea from an aircraft carrier. The player can also practice flying and aerobatics in "free flight" mode, dogfight against Soviet MiGs, launch strikes against land or sea-based targets, or watch a demo. For either combat mode, the player can select which missiles and bombs the plane will have.

Most of the indicators on a real jet fighter are present in Jet: altimeter, heading, frame loading, gear status, brake status, fuel level, radar, attitude, and range. The player can turn a few of these on and off. The controls consist of either the joystick or numeric keypad for steering and other keys to handle the chosen optional indicators, landing gear, weapons, and an eject button. Different perspectives can be chosen - a view from the control tower instead of the jet's cockpit.

== Reception ==
Jet was Sublogic's second best-selling Commodore 64 game as of late 1987. Describing it as "an upscale, friendlier version of Flight Simulator, Compute!'s Gazette in 1986 said that the Commodore 64 version was "a great computer game doing what it does best—and letting you have some fun". Compute! in 1987 favorably reviewed the Apple II version of Jet and its excellent graphics, but criticized the slow performance, reporting that it was "painfully slow" at updating the display.

Computer Gaming World called Jet "more of a 'game'" than F/A-18 Interceptor, which the magazine described as "a 'toy' ... you play a game, you play with a toy". The reviewer recommended both. In a 1994 survey of wargames the magazine gave the title one-plus stars out of five, describing the combat "mediocre".

== See also ==
- Microsoft Flight Simulator
- Falcon 4.0
