= Pure-Stat Baseball =

1986 video game

- Publisher: Sublogic
- Platforms: Apple II, Commodore 64, MS-DOS
- Release: 1986
- Genre: Sports

Pure-Stat Baseball is a 1986 video game published by Sublogic.

== Gameplay ==
Pure-Stat Baseball is a game in which baseball games are playable as solo games, player against player, or with the computer playing both teams.

== Reception ==
Johnny Wilson reviewed the game for Computer Gaming World, and stated that "For those who want to have a computer league on Apple or Commodore machines, Pure-Stat provides a nice array of options and plenty of managerial challenges."

David M. Wilson and Johnny L. Wilson reviewed the game for Computer Gaming World, and stated that "The graphics routines (with their annoying flip-flop of the stadium perspective) still tend to slow play down, but the game is still significant because of the number of offensive choices available (seven relate to the batter and seven to the baserunner) and defensive options provided (four for the pitcher and five for the fielders)."
