= Football (1986 video game) =

1986 sports video game

- Developer: Quest
- Publisher: Sublogic
- Programmers: C64; Edward Daniels Jr. Joe Mallozzi
- Artist: Joseph McCarthy (C64)
- Platforms: Commodore 64, MS-DOS
- Release: 1986
- Genre: Sports

Football is an American football video game developed by Quest and published in 1986 by Sublogic for the Commodore 64 and MS-DOS.

== Gameplay ==
Football is a game in which two teams consisting of fictional players are included, and the ratings of these players can be adjusted.

== Reception ==
Rick Teverbaugh reviewed the game for Computer Gaming World, and stated that "The cleverly titled Football, from subLogic, is a nice enough game. The game system is much easier to implement than many recent efforts, but the graphics are only average (detail of the field is missing)."

Roy Wagner reviewed the game for Computer Gaming World, and stated that "I was disappointed in seeing this game turn out to be not as good a simulation as I expected. Perhaps it was because after such great flying simulations, I expected too much when my feet were back on the ground."
