= Stealth Mission =

1988 video game

- Publisher(s): Sublogic
- Platform(s): Commodore 64
- Release: 1988
- Genre(s): Combat flight simulator

Stealth Mission is a 1988 video game published by Sublogic for the Commodore 64.

== Gameplay ==
Stealth Mission is a game in which the player can choose from three different aircraft to pilot: the F-19 Stealth Fighter, the X-29 Swept Wing, and the F-14 Tomcat.

== Reception ==
Brad Bombardiere reviewed the game for Computer Gaming World, and stated that "even though this game doesn't really offer the intensity that one could expect from other recent flight simulations, the potential buyer must weigh the abstract nature of the scenarios and somewhat slower pace against the graphic excellence and technical quality of the Sublogic line."
