= Thunderchopper =

1986 video game

- Developer: Sublogic
- Publisher: Actionsoft
- Platforms: Apple II, Commodore 64, MS-DOS
- Release: 1986: Apple II; 1987: C64; 1989: MS-DOS
- Genre: Combat flight simulation

Thunderchopper is a helicopter combat simulation video game published by Actionsoft for the Apple II in 1986 and Commodore 64 in 1987. An MS-DOS version was published by Sublogic in 1989.

== Gameplay ==
Thunderchopper is a game in which the player pilots a Hughes 530 MG Defender.

== Reception ==
M. Evan Brooks reviewed the game for Computer Gaming World, and stated that "Thunderchopper lacks the elan and panache that one would have expected." Zzap!64 gave a positive review, giving an overall rating of 83% and calling it "A polished, technically impressive flight simulator."
