= Microsoft Flight Simulator 5.0 =

1993 video game

- Developer: Bruce Artwick Organization
- Publisher: Microsoft
- Designer: Bruce Artwick
- Series: Microsoft Flight Simulator
- Platforms: MS-DOS, PC-98
- Release: 1993 (DOS); 1994 (PC-98); 1995 (5.1)
- Genre: Flight simulation
- Mode: Single-player

Microsoft Flight Simulator, commonly known as Microsoft Flight Simulator 5.0 or FS5, is a flight simulator video game released in late 1993 for MS-DOS. A port for PC-98 was released in 1994. It was the last game in the series for DOS and the last game to appear on a non-Microsoft platform. An updated version, 5.1, was released in 1995. In November 1995, Microsoft acquired the Bruce Artwick Organization (BAO) from Bruce Artwick. Employees were moved to Redmond, Washington, and development of the series continued in-house at Microsoft.

== Gameplay ==
Flight Simulator 5.0 is the first version of the series to use textures. This allowed FS5 to achieve a much higher degree of realism than the previous flat-shaded simulators. This also made all add-on scenery and aircraft for the previous versions obsolete, as they would look out of place.

The bundled scenery was expanded (now including parts of Europe). Improvements were made to the included aircraft models (Cessna 182 RG, Learjet 35A, Schweizer SGS 2-32, Sopwith Camel), the weather system's realism, and artificial intelligence. The coordinate system introduced in Flight Simulator 1 was revamped, and the scenery format was migrated from the old SCN/SC1 to the new and more complex BGL format.

More noticeable improvements included the use of digital audio for sound effects, custom cockpits for each aircraft (previous versions had one cockpit that was slightly modified to fit various aircraft), and better graphics.

It took about a year for add-on developers to get to grips with the new engine, but when they did they were not only able to release scenery, but also tools like Flightshop that made it feasible for users to design new objects.

=== Flight Simulator 5.1 ===
In 1995, Flight Simulator 5.1 was introduced, adding the ability to handle scenery libraries including wide use of satellite imagery, faster performance, and a barrage of weather effects: storms, 3D clouds, and fog became true-to-life elements in the Flight Simulator world. This edition was also the first version that was released on CD-ROM and the last for DOS. This was released in June 1995.

In the fall of 1995, with the release of the Flight shop program, nearly any aircraft could be built. The French program "Airport" was also available for free which allowed users to build airports (FS5.1 only had 250 worldwide) and other designers were doing custom aircraft cockpit panels. This all made for a huge amount of "freeware" to be released for the simulator. Forums such as CompuServe, Avsim, and Flightsim.com acted as libraries for uploads and discussion.

== Reception ==
Reception

Review scores
Publication	Score
PC Format	8/10
PC Joker	87/100

Timothy L. Trimble for Computer Gaming World said "In summary, Flight Simulator 5 is another leading edge step in flight simulation technology for microcomputers."

PC Format gave the game a score of 80% and said "[...] although when all's said and done, it's the taking off and landing rather than the long haul flights that are fun."

Flight Simulator 5.1 took first place on a June 1995 sales chart compiled by NPD Group, while Flight Unlimited debuted in twelfth place.
