= Microsoft Flight Simulator 3.0 =

1988 video game

- Developer: Sublogic
- Publisher: Microsoft
- Designer: Bruce Artwick
- Series: Microsoft Flight Simulator
- Platform: MS-DOS
- Release: 1988
- Genre: Flight simulation
- Mode: Single-player

Microsoft Flight Simulator, commonly known as Microsoft Flight Simulator 3.0 or FS3, is a flight simulator video game released in mid-1988 for the MS-DOS.

== Gameplay ==
FS 3.0 – Many more buildings and additional aircraft. For the first time, users had an option to view the aircraft from the outside. A Cessna Skylane flying over Chicago is shown here.

Microsoft Flight Simulator 3 improved the flight experience by adding additional aircraft and airports to the simulated area found in Microsoft Flight Simulator 2.0, as well as improved high-res (EGA) graphics, and other features lifted from the Amiga/ST versions.

The three simulated aircraft were the Gates Learjet 25, Cessna Skylane, and Sopwith Camel. Flight Simulator 3 also allowed the user to customize the display; multiple windows, each displaying one of several views, could be positioned and sized on the screen. The supported views included the instrument and control panel, a map view, and various external camera angles.

This version included a program to convert the old series of Sublogic Scenery Disks into scenery files (known as SCN files), which could then be copied to the FS3 directory, allowing the user to expand the FS world.

== Reception ==
Richard Sheffield for Compute! said "If you earned your wings on an old Flight Simulator version, you'll enjoy and appreciate the improvement made to version 3.0. If you're new to the hangar, this is the package to start with."

Robert Luhn for PC World said "if you're anxious for the next step in flight simulation, pick up version 3.0."

Steve Williams for Family Computing said "The graphics of Version 3.0 look better; the game system allows for more flexibility; and the improved planes give flying aces fresh challenges while the new options help novice pilots ease into flying. Flight Simulator 3.0 leaves all the other flight simulators flapping their wings."
