= Microsoft Flight Simulator 2002 =

2001 video game

- Developer: Microsoft
- Publisher: Microsoft
- Producer: Ken Lavering
- Designer: Carl Edlund
- Artists: Rick Welsh; Jason Waskey
- Series: Microsoft Flight Simulator
- Platform: Windows
- Release: NA: October 23, 2001; EU: October 26, 2001
- Genre: Flight simulation
- Modes: Single-player, multiplayer

Microsoft Flight Simulator 2002, also known as FS2002, is a video game released in October 2001, and is the 8th installment of the Microsoft Flight Simulator video game series. A version called Professional Edition was released at the same time as standard edition that added two aircraft, a flight instructor feature, and an editor to create buildings and aircraft.

== Gameplay ==
FS2002 (8.0) – Autogen allowed the environment throughout the world to be true to its surroundings. A Cessna C172SP Skyhawk above the default Meigs Field Airport in Chicago.

FS2002 (8.0) improved vastly over previous versions. In addition to improved graphics, FS2002 introduced air traffic control (ATC) and artificial intelligence (AI) aircraft enabling users to fly alongside computer controlled aircraft and communicate with airports. An option for a target frame rate was added, enabling a cap on the framerate to reduce stutter while performing texture loading and other maintenance tasks. In addition, aircraft feature a 3D virtual cockpit, creating in effect a view of the cockpit from the viewpoint of a real pilot. The external view also featured an inertia effect, inducing an illusion of movement in a realistic physical environment.

== Alterations due to September 11 attacks ==
Microsoft removed the scenery of the original World Trade Center from the game to respect the victims of the September 11 attacks shortly before it was released.

== Reception ==
=== Sales ===
In the United States, Flight Simulator 2002 debuted at #12 on NPD Intelect's computer game sales rankings for October 2001, at an average retail price of $70. It was absent from the top 20 by November. By the end of 2001, the game's domestic sales totaled 130,954 units, for revenues of $9 million. Internationally, the game received a "Silver" sales award from the Entertainment and Leisure Software Publishers Association (ELSPA), indicating sales of at least 100,000 copies in the United Kingdom.

=== Reviews and awards ===
Flight Simulator 2002 won PC Gamer US's 2001 "Best Simulation" and the Academy of Interactive Arts & Sciences' "PC Simulation" awards. The former publication's editors wrote that the game "narrowly prevailed" against IL-2 Sturmovik, and commented that its winning despite having no "guns, missiles or explosive pyrotechnic effects of any kind is remarkable testimony of the bleeding-edge quality of Microsoft's benchmark product." Computer Games Magazine, The Electric Playground and Computer Gaming World all nominated Flight Simulator 2002 as the top simulation of 2001, but these awards went instead to IL-2 Sturmovik. Computer Gaming World's editors called Flight Simulator 2002 "an excellent iteration of the esteemed series," and a game that "took on the daunting task of increasing the detail level of the entire world at least a hundredfold."

== See also ==
- 2001 in video games
- List of entertainment affected by the September 11 attacks
