= Microsoft Space Simulator =

1994 video game

- Developer: Bruce Artwick Organization Ltd.
- Publisher: Microsoft
- Designer: Charles Guy
- Platform: MS-DOS
- Release: 1994; 32 years ago
- Genre: Space flight simulator
- Mode: Single player

Microsoft Space Simulator is a space flight simulator program, based on Microsoft Flight Simulator for MS-DOS. It was one of the first general-purpose space flight simulators and it incorporated concepts from astrodynamics, motion, and celestial mechanics.

== Development ==
Microsoft Space Simulator was released under the Microsoft Home line in 1994. It was developed by BAO Ltd., a company run by Bruce Artwick (who was also behind the development of Microsoft Flight Simulator) with Charles Guy as lead developer.

It provided support for 256-color graphics on three resolutions: 320x400, 640x400, and 800x600. The graphics featured dithered gouraud shading 3D vessels, with texture mapped planets, moons, and deep-sky objects.

== Physics engine ==
Microsoft Space Simulator uses Newton's laws of motion but takes account of relativistic effects by decreasing a spacecraft's acceleration as its speed approaches the speed of light. It does not take account of time dilation.

Atmospheric effect are not modeled and all planetary surfaces are treated as flat spheres. A limited collision detection between vessels is implemented by using docking ports.

== Features ==
The simulator featured 14 different spacecraft, most of them futuristic. Historical or current tech craft include the Space Shuttle (with its Manned Maneuvering Unit) and Apollo Command/Service Module and Lunar Module.

== Reception ==
PC Gamer gave the simulator a score of 84% in its September 1994 issue, praising its graphics and realistic approach to space travel, while criticizing the poor or non-existent sound and the interface. Others praised the lack of sound indicating how it added realism.
