= Laminar Research =

Columbia, South Carolina, software company

- Type: Private
- Industry: Video games
- Founder: Austin Meyer
- Headquarters: South Burlington, Vermont, U.S.
- Products: X-Plane

Laminar Research is a small software company based in Columbia, South Carolina, and dedicated to providing software that accurately reflects the laws of physics. Laminar's flagship product is the flight simulator X-Plane. The simulator works with Macintosh, Microsoft Windows, and Linux. They also have mobile versions for iPhone, iPad, and Android.

In 2004, Laminar Research released the software Space Combat.

Laminar also produced a Mecha simulator titled Young's Modulus.

In October 2012, Laminar Research announced that they were being sued by Uniloc over an alleged patent infringement. Austin Meyer produced a documentary film called The Patent Scam, about his experiences being sued by Uniloc.

In May 2017, X-Plane 11 was released, a major iteration in their flight simulator. X-Plane 11 is available in both a consumer version, as well as a Federal Aviation Administration certifiable professional version. The software itself is not certified, as the certifiction is on both the software and the hardware.

In January 2022, Laminar Research announced the release of their upcoming next-generation simulator, X-Plane 12. It is slated to feature an overhaul of its weather engine, in addition to new aircraft.

In September 2022, Laminar Research published the "early access" demo of X-Plane 12 and started selling it in their website. In December 2022, X-Plane 12 was released.
