= Microsoft Flight Simulator (1986 video game) =

1986 video game

- Developer: Sublogic
- Publisher: Microsoft
- Series: Microsoft Flight Simulator
- Platform: Classic Mac OS
- Release: May 1986
- Genre: Flight simulation
- Mode: Single-player

Microsoft Flight Simulator is a 1986 video game developed by Sublogic and published by Microsoft for the Macintosh.

== Development ==
In 1984 Amiga Corporation asked Bruce Artwick to port Flight Simulator for its forthcoming computer, but Commodore's purchase of Amiga temporarily ended the relationship. Sublogic instead finished a Macintosh version, released by Microsoft, then resumed work on the Amiga and Atari ST versions.

The game included features such as a windowing system which allowed multiple 3D views simultaneously - this made exterior views possible for the aircraft itself.

== Reception ==
Frank Boosman reviewed the game for Computer Gaming World, and stated, "As a game, FS is exciting. Flying beneath the Golden Gate Bridge was a big thrill, and really had me sweating. FS wins as a simulation as well; the flight characteristics of the Cessna and Lear Jet seem realistic, and the instrumentation is complete."
