= Microsoft Flight Simulator 2.0 =

1984 video game

- Developer: Sublogic
- Publisher: Microsoft
- Designer: Bruce Artwick
- Series: Microsoft Flight Simulator
- Platforms: IBM PC, IBM PCjr, PC AT, IBM PC Convertible, MS-DOS, IBM PS/2
- Release: May 1984
- Genre: Flight simulation
- Mode: Single-player

Microsoft Flight Simulator, commonly known as Microsoft Flight Simulator 2.0 or FS2, is a flight simulator video game released in 1984 for the IBM PC as a self-booting disk.

== Publication history ==
FS 2.0 – Scenery coverage includes the entire United States.

In May 1984, Microsoft released their version 2 (v2.10) for IBM PCs. This version made small improvements to the original version, including the graphics and a more precise simulation in general. It added joystick and mouse input, as well as support for RGB (4-color CGA graphics) and composite monitors and IBM PCjr.

The new simulator expanded the scenery coverage to include a model of the entire United States, although the airports were limited to the same areas featured in the original Microsoft Flight Simulator.

Version 2.10a, released in August 1984, added PC AT support and minor bug corrections.

Later versions (2.11, unreleased and v2.12, released in April 1985) fixed a no color problem on PCjr graphics, adding Hercules graphics and EGA support.

Version 2.13, released in August 1986, added support for IBM PC Convertible, enhanced keyboard, 3.5" inch floppy drives, MS-DOS 3.2 and laptop LCD displays.

Version 2.14, released in June 1987 brought IBM PS/2 support.

Over the next year or two, compatibility with Sublogic Scenery Disks was provided, gradually covering the whole U.S. (including Hawaii), Japan, and part of Europe.

== Reception ==
David Florance for Compute! said "shortcomings are easily outweighed by the sheer delight this program brings."

Jason Durbin for PC World said of v. 2.13 "for the timid types who wouldn't be caught living or dead at 10,000 feet, Microsoft Flight Simulator is an excellent way to enjoy the thrill of flight vicariously."

Dick Aarons for PC Magazine said "I've found that the peaceful world of flying in the Microsoft Flight Simulator can provide hours of realistic flying fun."

Microsoft Flight Simulator, Version 2.0 was reviewed in 1989 in Dragon #142 by Hartley, Patricia, and Kirk Lesser in "The Role of Computers" column. The reviewers gave the game 5 out of 5 stars.
