= Flight Assignment: A.T.P. =

1990 video game

- Developer: Sublogic
- Platform: MS-DOS
- Release: 1990
- Genre: Amateur flight simulator

Flight Assignment: A.T.P. (Airline Transport Pilot) is an amateur flight simulator released in 1990 by the Sublogic for MS-DOS. It models the Boeing 737, 747, 767, Airbus A320 and Shorts 360, includes most major aviation beacons in the United States, and 30 major airports. It also includes a multi-voiced air traffic control simulator.

== Release ==
The game's July 1990 release was snarled by a lawsuit from Microsoft, which claimed ownership of some of Sublogic's source code rights, and it was settled with a number of concessions on the part of Sublogic, most notably dropping the phrase "flight simulator" from all of its products. This allowed the release of ATP in December 1990. Releases and updates continued through 1993, and the software remained on the market until December 13, 1995.

In late 1994, Italian company LAGO and Austrian company Nomissoft released a plugin for ATP entitled 3D Advanced Graphics System. The companies went on to purchase rights to portions of the ATP code from Sierra, which had acquired Sublogic in 1995. Although Sierra's own plans for a re-release of ATP on the Windows platform never came to fruition, LAGO and Nomissoft gave new life to the ATP code with the release of their own product, Airline Simulator in September 1996.

== Legacy ==
In April 1997, LAGO and Nomissoft showed a successor. Airline Simulator 2 Pro was demonstrated at a conference in Europe, but by that December development was halted, as the two companies parted due to fundamental disagreements about the way forward. In March 1998, Nomissoft announced that it had secured the necessary rights to Airline Simulator 2 code, and by August 4, 1999, the grandchild of Sublogic ATP hit retail.

Development of another followup, Airline Simulator 3, had long been teased by Nomissoft founder Simon Hradecky in parallel with Airline Simulator 2's development, but within weeks of AS2's release, AS3's development had been taken over by Aerosoft, a German company. Again, development stagnated, and finally in January 2013, the company confirmed that development had been ceased and the project written off.
