= Flight Simulator II (1983 video game) =

1983 video game

- Developer: Sublogic
- Publishers: Sublogic; Atari Corporation
- Designer: Bruce Artwick
- Platforms: Apple II, Atari 8-bit, Commodore 64, PC-98, Amiga, Atari ST, Tandy Color Computer 3
- Release: Apple II; NA: 1983; Atari 8-bit, C64; NA: 1984; PC-98; JP: 1986; Amiga, Atari ST, TCC 3; NA: 1987
- Genre: Amateur flight simulation
- Mode: Single-player

Flight Simulator II is a video game developed by Bruce Artwick and published by Sublogic as the sequel to FS1 Flight Simulator. It was released in December 1983 for the Apple II, in 1984 for Atari 8-bit computers and Commodore 64, in 1986 for the Amiga and Atari ST, the Atari XEGS as a pack-in title in 1987, and in August 1988 for the Tandy Color Computer 3.

== Development ==
Flying over the southern end of Meigs Field in Chicago (Apple II)

After the release of Flight Simulator for the IBM PC, Sublogic backported its improvements to other computers as Flight Simulator II. This version, like the Microsoft release, does away with wireframe graphics for solid colors, and uses real-world scenery (although limited to a few areas in the United States).

It includes the ability to load additional scenery from floppy disks. Twelve Scenery Disks covering the entire continental United States were released by Sublogic. A typical Scenery Disk covers three aeronautical sectionals, offering radio-navigation and visual scenery aids in the sectional areas covered. Four other Scenery Discs cover Western Europe, Japan, Hawaii and San Francisco.

== Reception ==
InfoWorld in 1984 praised Flight Simulator II for the Apple as "a complicated but exhilarating game ... Bruce Artwick has really done it all", and stated that it was superior to Microsoft's version. InfoWorld's Essential Guide to Atari Computers recommended the game as the best flight simulator for the Atari 8-bit, stating that "If you become a pro", players are "well on your way to understanding how powered flight actually feels".

Roy Wagner reviewed and compared Solo Flight and Flight Simulator II for Computer Gaming World, and stated that "This program is outstanding and certainly one of the best examples of excellent programming, documentation, and a full use of the capabilities of a microcomputer."

II Computing listed it ninth on the magazine's list of top Apple II games as of late 1985, based on sales and market-share data, and it was Sublogic's best-selling Commodore game as of late 1987.

In 1996, Computer Gaming World declared Flight Simulator II the 79th-best computer game ever released.
