= Microsoft Flight Simulator 2024 =

2024 simulation video game

- Developer: Asobo Studio
- Publisher: Xbox Game Studios
- Director: David Dedeine
- Designer: Damien Cuzacq
- Programmers: Lionel Fuentes; Philippe Rivaillon; Olivier Goguel
- Artist: Patrice Bourroncle
- Writers: Aurelie Belzanne; Eve Pioche
- Composer: Finishing Move Inc.
- Series: Microsoft Flight Simulator
- Platforms: Windows; Xbox Series X/S; PlayStation 5
- Release: November 19, 2024: Windows, Xbox Series X/S; November 19, 2024; PlayStation 5; December 8, 2025
- Genre: Flight simulation
- Modes: Single-player, multiplayer

Microsoft Flight Simulator 2024 is a flight simulation video game developed by Asobo Studio and published by Xbox Game Studios. The successor to Microsoft Flight Simulator (2020), the game was released on November 19, 2024, for Windows and the Xbox Series X/S, and on December 8, 2025, for PlayStation 5.

The game was announced at the 2023 Xbox Games Showcase on June 11, 2023. Compared with the 2020 entry, Microsoft Flight Simulator 2024 places greater emphasis on structured aviation activities through a career mode, expanded mission types, a denser simulated world, and revised aircraft and systems simulation. As of July 2026, the game had received multiple numbered Sim Updates, smaller hotfixes, and free World and City scenery updates distributed through the in-sim Marketplace.

== Gameplay ==
Microsoft Flight Simulator 2024 retains the globe-scale free flight, live weather, online traffic, and satellite-derived scenery systems of the 2020 game, while adding a more explicit activity structure around aviation jobs and skill progression. Its career mode allows players to begin at an airport of their choosing, gain experience and reputation, earn certifications, and unlock aviation specializations ranging from medevac and remote cargo operations to aerial firefighting, search and rescue, and airline passenger transport.

Mission types include aerial firefighting, air search and rescue, helicopter cargo hook transport, air ambulance, cropdusting, mountain rescue, skydiving, commercial aviation, aerial crane construction, outsize cargo transport with the Airbus Beluga, arctic cargo transport with the Airbus A400M, VIP air charter and executive transport, air racing, weather reconnaissance, experimental aircraft testing, and nap-of-the-earth flight with the A-10 Warthog. New aircraft categories include gliders, airships, hot air balloons, and electric vertical take-off and landing aircraft. The game also includes non-career activities such as landing challenges, rally races, low-altitude challenges, World Photographer objectives, and free flight.

The virtual world was substantially revised from the 2020 game. Microsoft described the environmental detail as increasing by a factor of 4,000, with ground surfaces no longer represented only as a heightfield: stones, rocks, gravel, and grass are modeled in 3D and can affect wheels during takeoff, landing, and taxiing. New environmental features include wildfires, snow, tornadoes, auroras, animal migration and herds, live marine and flight tracking, four seasons, and improved ground traffic reporting.

The simulator includes an EFB (electronic flight bag) for planning, charts, aircraft information, weight and balance, and flight-plan management. Microsoft and Asobo also described improvements to aircraft physics, avionics, and electrical, pneumatic, fuel, and hydraulic systems, along with greater multithreading support to improve performance. The redesigned preflight flow allows players to walk around aircraft and interact with covers, doors, and service items before flying.

== Differences from Microsoft Flight Simulator (2020) ==
The most visible design change from Microsoft Flight Simulator (2020) is the addition of a built-in career structure. While the 2020 game centered on free flight, discovery flights, bush trips, landing challenges, and add-on content, 2024 adds progression through certifications, reputation, specializations, and generated missions. The career system gives the simulator a more goal-oriented structure without replacing free flight.

Microsoft Flight Simulator 2024 is a standalone release, but Microsoft stated before launch that "virtually all" add-ons purchased through the 2020 game's in-sim Marketplace would work with the new version. Post-launch updates added more granular library controls: update 1.2.7.0 allowed users to enable or disable ported Microsoft Flight Simulator (2020) Marketplace content item by item, with non-Microsoft ported content disabled by default until the user chose to activate it.

The 2024 release also shifts more of the world and content pipeline toward streaming and the in-sim Marketplace. Free scenery updates continued after release, but the new version placed greater emphasis on streamed packages, compatibility flags, and library management for legacy and native 2024 content.

== Development ==
Asobo Studio served as the game's lead developer. A team of more than 200 at Asobo mainly worked to update the game's client to accommodate its new features, while Xbox worked with more than 30 external partners on various aspects of the simulator.

The game was released on November 19, 2024, on Xbox Series X/S and Windows. During State of Play on September 24, 2025, Microsoft announced that the game would be released on PlayStation 5 on December 8, 2025, making it the first entry in the series to be released on a Sony console. PlayStation VR2 support was later added as part of Sim Update 5 in April 2026.

== Post-release updates ==
Microsoft has supported Microsoft Flight Simulator 2024 with smaller patches, numbered Sim Updates, and free Marketplace scenery releases. Early updates addressed launch stability, loading, Marketplace compatibility, and add-on library management. Later updates expanded VR support, aircraft systems, career-mode logic, world streaming, EFB behavior, and performance.

Date	Update	Version	Main changes
November 21, 2024	Launch patch	1.1.9.0	Addressed early post-launch bugs and stability issues after the game's server-constrained release.
November 27, 2024	Launch patch	1.1.10.0	Continued early stability, aircraft, career, and library fixes.
December 4, 2024	Patch	1.2.7.0	Added per-item enable and disable controls for ported 2020 Marketplace content, with non-Microsoft ported content disabled by default.
December 20, 2024	Patch	1.2.8.0	Fixed crashes, airport performance problems, aircraft animation and lighting issues, and several mission and online-service bugs.
January 9, 2025	Hotfix	1.2.11.0	Fixed a regression from update 1.2.8.0 that prevented avionics from working correctly in some aircraft.
March 6, 2025	Sim Update 1	1.3.23.0	Opened the in-sim Marketplace to all users and delivered broad stability, loading-time, VR, aircraft, and career fixes.
May 15, 2025	Sim Update 2	1.4.20.0	Updated aircraft, core systems, career mode, online services, world streaming, marketplace filters, controls, and developer tools; added native foveated rendering support for VR.
August 20, 2025	Sim Update 3	1.5.27.0	Added control-menu filters and UI refinements, optimized boot and loading times, reduced VRAM use, improved airport performance, and refined EFB flight-plan handling.
December 8, 2025	Sim Update 4	1.6.32.0	Added World Photographer collection refinements, console graphics options, helicopter vortex-ring-state assistance, and extensive stability and performance improvements.
April 30, 2026	Sim Update 5	1.7.27.0	Added PS VR2 support, unlocked heavy aircraft and VTOL career specializations, improved performance and stuttering, and refined career dispatching and VR interface behavior.
June 29, 2026	Sim Update 5.1	1.7.35.0	Improved texture mip streaming and terrain behavior under low-memory conditions, fixed crashes and avionics power-state bugs, and adjusted career mission scheduling around runway lighting.
July 2026	Sim Update 6 beta	1.8.5.0	Entered public beta testing with additional graphics, lighting, VR, free-flight, career, and bug-fix changes; it had not replaced Sim Update 5.1 as the stable release as of July 11, 2026.

Free scenery updates continued alongside the simulator patches. World Update 19, released in March 2025, focused on Brazil, Guyana, Suriname, and French Guiana. World Update 20 revisited Japan in September 2025, World Update 21 focused on Australia in May 2026, and World Update 22 added United States National Parks in July 2026. City Updates also continued, including updates for California, the Netherlands and Belgium, and the United States Midwest. In October 2026, World Update 23 was released, and it included Poland and the Baltics (Estonia, Latvia, Lithuania).

== Reception ==
Microsoft Flight Simulator 2024

Aggregate score
Aggregator	Score
Metacritic	78/100

Review scores
Publication	Score
Eurogamer	4/5
IGN	9/10
PC Gamer (US)	90/100

Microsoft Flight Simulator 2024 received "generally positive" reviews according to review aggregator Metacritic, with several publications praising the game for its new features, enhanced visuals, and landscape streaming features. Criticism was directed at long loading times and missing content during launch, caused by high demand and server-side problems. Players encountered long virtual queues and, in some cases, could not reliably access the simulator.

Flight Simulator head Jorg Neumann apologized in a developer video on launch day, while Asobo Studio CEO Sebastian Wloch said that a database cache had been overwhelmed, causing loading failures and missing content. The issues led to an "Overwhelmingly Negative" user-review rating on Steam shortly after release, with media outlets including GameSpot reporting that the game had been review bombed. Microsoft later stated that additional server capacity had been added while the team continued working on launch issues.

In 2025, Microsoft Flight Simulator 2024 won Best Technological Innovation at the Pegases Awards. It was also nominated for Visual Excellence.
