= Microsoft Flight Simulator =

Series of flight simulator software

- Logo introduced at E3 2019 for Microsoft Flight Simulator (2020)
- Genre: Flight simulation
- Developers: Sublogic; Bruce Artwick Organization; Aces Game Studio; Dovetail Games; Asobo Studio
- Publishers: Microsoft; Xbox Game Studios; Dovetail Games
- Creator: Bruce Artwick
- Platforms: MS-DOS, Classic Mac OS, PC-98, PlayStation 5, Windows, Xbox Series X/S, Xbox Cloud Gaming
- First release: Microsoft Flight Simulator; November 1982; 44 years ago
- Latest release: Microsoft Flight Simulator 2024; November 19, 2024; 23 months ago

Microsoft Flight Simulator is a series of flight simulation video games for MS-DOS, Classic Mac OS, and Microsoft Windows operating systems. It was an early product in the Microsoft application portfolio and differed significantly from Microsoft's other software, which was largely business-oriented. Microsoft Flight Simulator is Microsoft's longest-running software product line, predating Windows by three years, and is one of the longest-running video game series of all time.

Bruce Artwick began the development of Flight Simulator in 1977. His company, Sublogic, initially distributed it for various personal computers. In 1981, Artwick was approached by Microsoft's Alan M. Boyd who was interested in creating a "definitive game" that would graphically demonstrate the difference between older 8-bit computers, such as the Apple II, and the new 16-bit computers, such as the IBM PC, still in development. In 1982, Artwick's company licensed a version of Flight Simulator for the IBM PC to Microsoft, which marketed it as Microsoft Flight Simulator.

In 2009, Microsoft closed down Aces Game Studio, which was the department responsible for creating and maintaining the Flight Simulator series. In 2014, Dovetail Games were granted the rights by Microsoft to port the Gold Edition of Microsoft's Flight Simulator X to Steam and publish Flight Simulator X: Steam Edition.

Microsoft announced a new installment at E3 in 2019, simply titled Microsoft Flight Simulator, to be released initially on PC and ported over to the Xbox Series consoles at a later date. On July 12, 2020, Microsoft opened up preorders and announced that Microsoft Flight Simulator for PC would be available on August 18, 2020. The company announced three different versions of the title – standard, deluxe, and premium deluxe, each providing an incremental set of gameplay features, including airports, and airplanes to choose from. The Xbox edition was released on July 27, 2021.

The latest entry, Microsoft Flight Simulator 2024, was released on November 19, 2024.

== History ==
Release timeline Microsoft omitted from the titles
1982	Flight Simulator
1983
1984	Flight Simulator 2.0
1985
1986	Flight Simulator (for Macintosh)
1987
1988	Flight Simulator 3.0
1989	Flight Simulator 4.0
1990
1991
1992
1993	Flight Simulator 5.0
1994
1995	Flight Simulator 5.1
1996	Flight Simulator for Windows 95
1997	Flight Simulator 98
1998
1999	Flight Simulator 2000
2000
2001	Flight Simulator 2002
2002
2003	Flight Simulator 2004: A Century of Flight
2004
2005
2006	Flight Simulator X
2007
2008
2009
2010
2011
2012
2013
2014	Flight Simulator X: Steam Edition
2015
2016
2017
2018
2019
2020	Flight Simulator
2021
2022
2023
2024	Flight Simulator 2024

Microsoft Flight Simulator began as a set of articles written by Bruce Artwick in 1976 about a 3D computer graphics program. When the magazine editor said that subscribers wanted to buy the program, Artwick set to work to create it and incorporated a company called Sublogic Corporation in 1977. The company began selling flight simulators for several computer platforms, including the 8080, Altair 8800, and IMSAI 8080. In 1979 Sublogic released FS1 Flight Simulator for the Apple II. In 1980, Sublogic released a version for the TRS-80, and in 1982 they licensed an IBM PC version with CGA graphics to Microsoft, which was released as simply Microsoft Flight Simulator on a self-booting disk. In the early days of less-than-100% IBM PC compatible systems, Flight Simulator and Lotus 1-2-3 were used as unofficial compatibility test software for new PC clone models.

Sublogic continued to develop for other platforms and ported Flight Simulator II to the Apple II in 1983; Commodore 64, MSX, and Atari 8-bit computers in 1984; and Amiga and Atari ST in 1986. Meanwhile, Bruce Artwick left Sublogic and founded The Bruce Artwick Organization to continue his work on subsequent Microsoft releases, beginning with Microsoft Flight Simulator 3.0 in 1988. Microsoft Flight Simulator reached commercial maturity with version 3.1, and went on to encompass the use of 3D graphics and graphic hardware acceleration.

=== September 11 attacks and controversy ===
Following the September 11, 2001 terrorist attacks in the United States, Microsoft Flight Simulator became part of public discussion due to speculation that the software may have been used by the hijackers to practice flying. Although investigators did not confirm that the game played any role in the attacks, the association generated media attention and public concern.

In response to the attacks, Microsoft announced that future versions of the simulator would remove visual representations of the World Trade Center from the in-game New York City environment. The company stated that the decision was made out of consideration for those affected by the tragedy and to avoid causing additional distress. Microsoft also reviewed certain introductory content in the game that referenced near-collisions with major landmarks, acknowledging that such material could now be perceived as insensitive given the circumstances.

The controversy also affected retailers. Several major UK stores temporarily withdrew copies of Microsoft Flight Simulator from sale as a gesture of respect. Some retailers removed multiple versions of the title from shelves while reviewing their policies on stocking the game during the immediate aftermath of the attacks. Microsoft, however, maintained that claims linking the simulator to the events were speculative and emphasized that the product had been sold globally for many years without issue.

The incident marked a rare moment in which a civilian flight simulation game became entangled in broader geopolitical and ethical debates about digital media, realism, and responsibility. It also contributed to wider discussions about the relationship between video games and real world events.

Microsoft continued to produce newer versions of the flight simulation software, adding features, such as new aircraft types and augmented scenery. The 2000 and 2002 versions were available in "Standard" and "Professional" editions, where the latter included more aircraft, tools and scenery options. The 2004 release (version 9) marked the celebration of one hundred years of powered flight and had only one edition. Flight Simulator X, released in 2006, returned to dual versions with a "Standard" and a "Deluxe" edition.

The flying area encompasses planet Earth with varying degrees of detail and includes over 24,000 airports. There is an ever-growing list of scenery representing major landmarks and popular cities. Landscape details become sparse as gameplay moves away from population centers within the flight simulator, particularly outside the United States, although a variety of websites offer scenery add-ons to remedy this.

The three latest versions incorporate sophisticated weather simulation, along with the ability to download real-world weather data (first available with Flight Simulator 2000). Additional features in these newer versions include air traffic environments with interactive air traffic control functions, new aircraft models from the historical Douglas DC-3 to the modern Boeing 777, interactive lessons, challenges, and aircraft checklists. The two latest versions of Microsoft Flight Simulator have a "kiosk mode", which allows the application to be run in electronic kiosks located in public places like shopping malls. Microsoft Flight Simulator has a wide selection of upgrades and add-ons, both free and commercial, official and fan-made.

=== Microsoft Flight Simulator X ===
Microsoft Flight Simulator X is the third most recent major release of Microsoft Flight Simulator, and the last one developed by Aces Game Studio. It includes a graphics engine upgrade and compatibility with preview DirectX 10 and Windows Vista. It was released on October 17, 2006, in North America. There are two versions of the game, both on two DVDs. The "Deluxe" edition contains the new Garmin G1000 integrated flight instrument system in three cockpits, additional aircraft, and missions; Tower Control capability in multiplayer mode; higher detail scenery for cities and airports; and a Software Development Kit (SDK) for development. The main improvements are graphical.

Microsoft has also released a Flight Simulator X demo, which contains three aircraft, two airports, and two missions. It is compatible with Windows XP SP2 and Windows Vista.

=== Closure of the Aces Game Studio ===
On January 22, 2009, it was reported that the development team was heavily affected by Microsoft's program of job cuts, with indications that the entire Microsoft Flight Simulator team had been laid off. Microsoft confirmed the closure of the Aces Game Studio on January 26, 2009, in a post on the official FSInsider Web site. stating "This difficult decision was made to align Microsoft's resources with our strategic priorities. Microsoft Flight Simulator X will remain available at retail stores and Web retailers, the Flight Sim community will continue to learn from and encourage one another, and we remain committed to the Flight Simulator franchise for the long term."

According to former Aces employee Phil Taylor, the shutdown was not due to sales performance of FSX, but due to management problems and delays in project delivery, combined with increased demand for staff. Speculation in the mainstream and gaming media was that future versions could be released as an Internet-based version, or on Microsoft's Xbox platform.

In October 2009, two (out of over fifty) former members of the Aces Game Studio formed a new game studio called the Cascade Game Foundry for the development of simulation games.

=== Third-party developer agreements ===
==== Lockheed Martin Prepar3D ====
In late 2007, Aces Game Studio announced Microsoft ESP (Enterprise Simulation Platform), a development platform for companies that want to create products that use the technology in Flight Simulator. Following the closure of the Aces Game Studio in January 2009, Lockheed Martin announced in late 2009 that they had negotiated with Microsoft a licensing agreement to purchase the intellectual property (including source code) for the Microsoft ESP product. It is the commercial-use version of Flight Simulator X SP2. On May 17, 2010, Lockheed announced that the new product based upon the ESP source code would be called Prepar3D (P3D). Lockheed hired members of the original Aces Game Studio team to continue development of the product.

In November 2010, Lockheed Martin debuted Prepar3D version 1. Version 1.1 was released in April 2011, with a retail license cost of US$499. A developer license is also available for a monthly fee of US$9.95. In March 2012, along with the release of version 1.3, the pricing strategy was revised. The Professional edition is now available for US$199, with an Academic License available for US$59.95.

Often touted as 'FSX on steroids', P3D has so far had 5 versions, with the latest launched on April 14, 2020. Version 5 features 41 aircraft and over 23000 airports. Before that, version 2, 3 and 4 saw releases in 2013, 2015, and 2017 respectively.

Due to the changes in elevation between version 4 and version 5, many developers charged for upgrades to make their airport sceneries compatible with the new elevation. This elevation issue, in turn, created new developers to pop up to create "compatibility files" for older version 4 airports to work on version 5. Companies such as iniBuilds and Scandinavian Mountains lead the development of compatibility files.

==== Dovetail Games and Microsoft Flight Simulator X: Steam Edition ====
On July 9, 2014, Dovetail Games announced that Microsoft had granted them rights to develop the next Flight Simulator in the series. Dovetail Games also announced the release of Flight Simulator X: Gold Edition on Steam for late 2014, titled Microsoft Flight Simulator X: Steam Edition. It was released on December 18, 2014. It is a re-release and includes content that was provided with the original FSX: Gold Edition which includes FSX: Deluxe Edition, the Acceleration expansion pack, and both official Service Packs and repackages them in one bundle and a single installation. The Steam Edition includes "all standard Steam functionality", including an overhaul of the multiplayer support to go through Steam rather than the now-defunct GameSpy, improved stability on Windows 7 and 8, and features minor performance tweaks including a complete recompile using VS2013.

Additionally, Dovetail Games has worked with existing developers and publishers to distribute their content on Steam as DLC. Currently, there are over 100 add-ons for FSX: Steam Edition from over 35 developers available on the Steam store including Aerosoft, Captain Sim, Orbx Simulation Systems, Real Environment Xtreme (REX), Carenado, Virtavia, and others.

===== Flight Sim World =====
In May 2017, Dovetail Games announced Flight Sim World, based on the codebase of Flight Simulator X, and released later that month. Only a year later, on April 23, 2018, Dovetail announced end of development of Flight Sim World and the end of sales effective May 15, 2018.

=== Microsoft Flight ===
Microsoft released a new flight simulator titled Microsoft Flight in February 2012. Developed by The Coalition (as Microsoft Game Studios Vancouver), it was not part of the Microsoft Flight Simulator series, but instead was designed to replace it and aimed at drawing new users into flight gaming. While claiming to be simpler to use for inexperienced users, it is incompatible with Flight Simulator and does not allow the use of existing Flight Simulator add-ons (including aircraft, objects, and photographic scenery).

The game was "pay to play", as only the single island of Hawai'i and one aircraft was available without buying downloadable content. On July 26, 2012, Microsoft cancelled further development of Flight.

=== Microsoft Flight Simulator (2020) ===
On June 9, 2019, as part of their E3 conference announcements Microsoft revealed that they would be bringing back the Flight Simulator series with an updated release, simply titled Microsoft Flight Simulator. On the same day, Microsoft launched a new website for the title and posted a teaser video on their Xbox YouTube channel. The new version features tight integration of ground satellite data and Microsoft's own Azure AI into the simulator's engine to generate near-photorealistic graphics. Asobo Studio is the lead developer.

The game is Microsoft's first simulator since Microsoft Flight in 2012. In addition to the PC release it was also released for the Xbox Series X and Series S, making it the first entry in the Microsoft Flight Simulator series to be released for a gaming console. The Windows PC version of the simulator was released on August 18, 2020. Microsoft Flight Simulator launched for Xbox Series X and Series S on July 27, 2021 and can be played on the Xbox One with Cloud Gaming from Xbox Game Pass.

=== Microsoft Flight Simulator 2024 ===
On June 11, 2023, during the Xbox Games Showcase Microsoft revealed a trailer for Microsoft Flight Simulator 2024, which was captioned "the next generation of the legendary franchise." It was released in November 2024.

== Add-ons, customization, and community involvement ==
The long history and consistent sales of Flight Simulator has encouraged a very large body of add-on packages to be developed as both commercial and volunteer ventures. A formal software development kit and other tools for the simulator exist to further facilitate third-party efforts, and some third parties have also learned to 'tweak' the simulator in various ways by trial and error. As for number of add-ons, tweaks, and modifications Flight Simulator can accommodate solely depends on the user's hardware setup. The number is not limited by the simulator, and when multiple computers are linked together with multiple monitors and third-party software and controls, Flight Simulator enthusiasts can build their own realistic home cockpits.

=== Aircraft ===
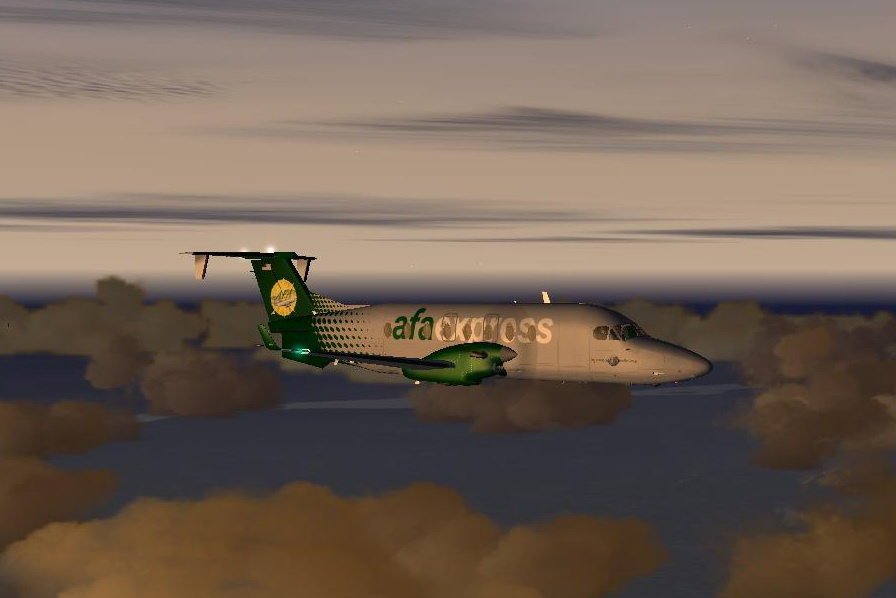
A PMDG Beech 1900D of "American Flight Airways", in AFA Express colors

Individual attributes of Flight Simulator aircraft that can be customized include; cockpit layout, cockpit image, aircraft model, aircraft model textures, aircraft flight characteristics, scenery models, scenery layouts, and scenery textures, often with simple-to-use programs, or only a text editor such as 'Notepad'. Dedicated 'flight simmers have taken advantage of Flight Simulator's vast add-on capabilities, having successfully linked Flight Simulator to homebuilt hardware, some of which approaches the complexity of commercial full-motion flight simulators.

The simulator's aircraft are made up of five parts:

- The model, which is a 3D CAD-style model of the aircraft's exterior and virtual cockpit, if applicable. Models consist of two distinct sections - the main chassis or "core", and accessories or dynamic parts, such as the landing gear or ailerons.
- The textures, bitmap images which the game layers onto the model. These can be easily edited (known as repainting), so that a model can adopt any paint scheme imaginable, real or fictional.
- The sounds, literally what the aircraft sounds like. This is determined by defining which WAV files the aircraft uses as its sound-set.
- The panel, a representation of the aircraft's cockpit. This includes one or more bitmap images of the panel, instrument gauge files, and sometimes its own sounds.
- The FDE, or Flight Dynamics Engine. This consists of the air-file (a *.air file), which contains hundreds of parameters that define the aircraft's flight characteristics, and the aircraft.cfg file, which contains more and easier-to-edit parameters.

Most versions of Microsoft Flight Simulator include some of the world's most popular aircraft from different categories, such as the Mooney Bravo and Beechcraft Baron 58, which fall into the general aviation category; the Airbus A321 and Boeing 737, which fall into the civil jets category; the Robinson R22, which falls into the helicopter category; the Air Scheffel 738, which falls into the general aviation category again; and many other planes commonly used around the world.

Not being limited to using the default aircraft, add-on planes can be downloaded from many sources for free or purchased, which can then be installed into Microsoft Flight Simulator. The Beechcraft 1900D, pictured above, is an add-on aircraft. Similarly, add-on repaints can be added to default aircraft; these repaints are usually downloaded for free.

==== AI traffic ====
A growing add-on category for the series is AI (artificial intelligence) traffic. AI traffic is the simulation of other vehicles in the FS landscape. This traffic plays an important role in the simulator, as it is possible to crash into traffic (this can be disabled), thus ending the player's session, and to interact with the traffic via the radio and ATC. This feature is active even with third-party traffic. Microsoft introduced AI traffic in MSFS 2002 with several airliners and private aircraft. This has since been supplemented with many files created by third-party developers. Typically, third-party aircraft models have multiple levels of detail, which allow the AI traffic to be better on frame rates, while still being detailed during close looks. There are several prominent freeware developers. Some third-party AI traffic can also be configured for "real-time" departures.

=== Scenery ===
FS2004 in the UK Lake District with VFR (visual flight rules) photo scenery and terrain additional components

Scenery add-ons usually involve replacements for existing airports, with enhanced and more accurate detail, or large expanses of highly detailed ground scenery for specific regions of the world. Some types of scenery add-on replace or add structures to the simulator. Both freeware and payware scenery add-ons are very widely available. Airport enhancements, for example, range from simple add-ons that update runways or taxiways to very elaborate packages that reproduce every lamp, pavement marking, and structure at an airport with near-total accuracy, including animated effects such as baggage cars or marshalling agents. Wide-area scenery enhancements may use detailed satellite photos and 3-D structures to closely reproduce real-world regions, particularly those including large cities, landmarks, or spectacular natural wonders.

=== Flight networks ===
Virtual flight networks such as IVAO, VATSIM, and Pilot Edge as well as Virtual Skies, and Mindstar Aviation's AirspaceVR use special, small add-on modules for Flight Simulator to enable connection to their proprietary networks in multiplayer mode, and to allow for voice and text communication with other virtual pilots and controllers over the network. These networks allow players to enjoy and enhance realism in their game. These networks are for ATC (air traffic control).

=== Miscellaneous ===
Some utilities, such as FSUIPC, merely provide useful tweaks for the simulator to overcome design limitations or bugs, or to allow more extensive interfacing with other third-party add-ons. Sometimes certain add-ons require other utility add-ons in order to work correctly with the simulator.

Other add-ons provide navigation tools, simulation of passengers, and cameras that can view aircraft or scenery from any angle, more realistic instrument panels and gauges, and so on.

Some software add-ons provide operability with specific hardware, such as game controllers and optical motion sensors.

FSDeveloper.com is one website that host a forum style knowledge base aimed at the development of add-on items, tools, and software.

Excel Unusual hosts two versions of flight simulator downloads and tutorials, built from scratch with only VBA and cell formulas, in both 2D and 3D.

=== Availability ===
A number of websites are dedicated to providing users with add-on files (such as airplanes from actual airlines, airport utility cars, actual buildings located in specific cities, textures, and city files). The wide availability over the internet of freeware add-on files for the simulation package has encouraged the development of a large and diverse virtual community, linked up by design group and enthusiast message boards, online multiplayer flying, and 'virtual airlines'. The internet has also facilitated the distribution of 'payware' add-ons for the simulator, with the option of downloading the files, which reduces distribution costs.

== Reception ==
Flight Simulator has been praised for its realism. PC Magazine in January 1983 called Flight Simulator "extraordinarily realistic ... a classic program, unique in the market". It praised the graphics and detailed scenery, and concluded "I think it's going to sell its share of IBM PCs, and will certainly sell some color/graphics adapters". BYTE in December 1983 wrote that "this amazing package does an incredible job of making you think you're actually flying a small plane". While it noted the inability to use a RGB monitor or a joystick, the magazine concluded that "for $49.95 you can't have everything". A pilot wrote in the magazine in March 1984 that he found the simulated Cessna 182 to be "surprisingly realistic". While criticizing the requirement of using the keyboard to fly, he concluded "Microsoft Flight Simulator is a tour de force of the programmer's art ... It can be an excellent introduction to how an aircraft actually operates for a budding or student pilot and can even help instrument pilots or those going for an instrument rating sharpen their skills".

Another pilot similarly praised Flight Simulator 2.0 in PC Magazine that year, giving it 18 out of 18 points. He reported that its realism compared well to two $3 million hardware flight simulators he had recently flown, and that he could use real approach plates to land at and navigate airports Flight Simulator's manual did not document. Compute! warned "if you don't know much about flying, this program may overwhelm you. It's not a simple simulation. It's a challenging program even for experienced pilots". The magazine concluded that Flight Simulator "is interesting, challenging, graphically superb, diverse, rewarding, and just plain fun ... sheer delight". Flight Simulator 2.0 was reviewed in 1989 in Dragon #142 by Hartley, Patricia, and Kirk Lesser in "The Role of Computers" column. The reviewers gave the game 5 out of 5 stars.

Computer Gaming World stated in 1994 that Flight Simulator 5 "is closer to simulating real flight than ever before".

Microsoft Flight Simulator X was reviewed in 2006 by GameSpot. The reviewer gave the game an 8.4 out of 10 and commented on how it was realistic enough to be used for real-life flight training.

== Awards ==
By June 1999, the series had sold 21 million units worldwide, for which it was awarded the Guinness World Record for best-selling flight simulator series.

The success of the Microsoft Flight Simulator series has led to Guinness World Records awarding the series seven world records in the Guinness World Records: Gamer's Edition 2008. These records include "Longest Running Flight Sim Series", "Most Successful Flight Simulator Series", and "Most Expensive Home Flight Simulator Cockpit", which was built by Australian trucking tycoon Matthew Sheil, and cost around $200,000 to build.

== See also ==
- Airfight
- FlightGear
- FlightSim.com and Avsim.com – Flight simulator resource and review communities
- International Virtual Aviation Organisation
- Microsoft Train Simulator, Microsoft Space Simulator, and Microsoft Combat Flight Simulator
- Training simulation
- Virtual Air Traffic Simulation Network
- X-Plane (simulator)
