= Microsoft Flight Simulator (1982 video game) =

Flight simulation video game

- Developer: Sublogic
- Publisher: Microsoft
- Designer: Bruce Artwick
- Series: Microsoft Flight Simulator
- Platform: IBM PC
- Release: November 1982
- Genre: Flight simulation
- Mode: Single-player

Microsoft Flight Simulator is a 1982 flight simulation video game, released in November 1982 for the IBM PC by Microsoft, developed by Bruce Artwick of Sublogic. It is the first installment in the Microsoft Flight Simulator series, and was developed from Artwick's earlier FS1 Flight Simulator.

The game allows the player to fly a Cessna 182 Skylane across four US regions, and features a World War I aerial combat mode set in Europe. Early versions were widely used as a benchmark test for PC compatibility.

Upon release, the game received positive reviews from the gaming press, with critics praising its realism and technical achievement. It sold approximately 800,000 copies in its first five years. In 2021, Microsoft Flight Simulator was inducted into The Strong National Museum of Play's World Video Game Hall of Fame.

== Gameplay ==
This image is of Microsoft Flight Simulator displaying color on a composite monitor. The game does have support for RGB monitors, but in monochrome only.

In Microsoft Flight Simulator, the player flies a Cessna 182 Skylane in one of four US regions: Chicago, Los Angeles, New York City, or Seattle. The starting airport is Meigs Field in Chicago, with a view of the city skyline to the left and Lake Michigan to the right. It would remain the default airport in future versions of Microsoft Flight Simulator, until the real airport was closed in 2003.

There is also a "Europe 1917" mode which is similar to the "British Ace" mode of FS1 Flight Simulator. This mode has the player flying a Sopwith Camel in a grid-divided area with mountains on two sides. They can declare war and fire at enemy aircraft.

== Development ==
In 1981, Microsoft contacted Bruce Artwick of Sublogic, the creator of FS1 Flight Simulator, to develop a new flight simulator for IBM compatible PCs. This version was released in November 1982 as ''Microsoft Flight Simulator''. It featured an improved graphics engine, variable weather and time of day, and a new coordinate system (used by all subsequent versions up to version 5). It was later updated and ported to other home computers as Flight Simulator II, published by Sublogic.

Advertisements claimed "If flying your IBM PC got any more realistic, you'd need a license", and promised "a full-color, out-the-window flight display". Early versions of Microsoft Flight Simulator were used as a test for PC compatibility. If a computer could run Microsoft Flight Simulator and Lotus 1-2-3, it was 100% IBM PC-compatible. (Note: Attributed to multiple references:)

== Reception ==
Microsoft Flight Simulator was positively received by the gaming press upon its release. Will Fastie, writing for Creative Computing, praised Microsoft for choosing to publish the title, calling it a classic program unlike anything else on the market. Jay Marrone of SoftSide described it as an entertaining program for anyone with an interest in aviation. Hartley G. Lesser of Electronic Fun with Computers & Games praised its realism, writing that the simulator felt as though it genuinely replicated the experience of flying a Cessna. Stan Miastkowski, reviewing the game for Byte, called it a remarkable technical accomplishment by its programmer.

The game sold about 800,000 copies in its first five years. In 2021, The Strong National Museum of Play inducted Microsoft Flight Simulator into its World Video Game Hall of Fame.
