= Flight Simulator (1980 video game) =

1980 video game

- TRS-80 version cover art
- Developer: Sublogic
- Publisher: Sublogic
- Designers: Bruce Artwick; Stu Moment
- Programmer: Bruce Artwick
- Platforms: Apple II, TRS-80
- Release: Apple II: NA: January 1980; TRS-80; 1980
- Genre: Amateur flight simulator
- Mode: Single-player

Flight Simulator is a 1980 flight simulator video game published by Sublogic for the Apple II (internally cataloged as A2-FS1 Flight Simulator). A TRS-80 version (T80-FS1) followed later that year. It is the first in a line of simulations from Sublogic which were also sold by Microsoft as the long-running Microsoft Flight Simulator series, beginning in 1982.

Sublogic later released updated versions for both the Apple II and TRS-80 on 5 1/4 inch diskettes. The updates include enhanced terrain, help menus, and a bomb sight.

== Gameplay ==
Apple II screenshot

Flight Simulator is a flight simulator in which the player pilots a somewhat modernized Sopwith Camel.

== Development ==
Computer-graphics specialist Bruce Artwick and pilot and marketing student Stu Moment were roommates at the University of Illinois. Released for the Apple II computer as A2-FS1 Flight Simulator with British Ace - 3D Aerial Battle, it was their first product after forming Sublogic, has black and white wireframe graphics, with very limited scenery consisting of 36 tiles (in a 6 by 6 pattern, which roughly equals a few hundred square kilometers), and provides a very basic simulation of one aircraft.

Sublogic advertised that the $25 FS1 "is a visual flight simulator that gives you realistically stable aircraft control", with a graphics engine "capable of drawing 150 lines per second".

== Ports ==
The simulator was later ported to the TRS-80 Model I under the name T80-FS1, which has only rudimentary graphics capability. Because of the TRS-80's limited memory and display, the instrument panel was dropped and the resolution of the cockpit window display reduced.

== Reception ==
J. Mishcon reviewed FS1 Flight Simulator in The Space Gamer No. 31. Mishcon commented that "all things considered, this is single most impressive computer game I have seen. It creates a whole new standard. I most strongly urge you to buy it and see for yourself".

Bob Proctor reviewed the game for Computer Gaming World, and said that "although there are other flight simulators, the Sublogic program remains unique for the built-in dogfight game. While raving about the simulation, reviewers have called the game 'difficult', 'challenging', and 'next to impossible'".

Flight Simulator sold 30,000 copies by June 1982, tied for third on Computer Gaming World's list of top sellers.
