= Sublogic =

American software development company

- Company type: Corporation
- Industry: Video game industry
- Founded: October 1977; 48 years ago
- Founders: Bruce Artwick; Stu Moment
- Headquarters: Urbana-Champaign, Illinois
- Products: FS1 Flight Simulator; Flight Simulator II; Microsoft Flight Simulator; Night Mission Pinball; Jet
- Website: www.sublogiccorp.com

Sublogic Corporation (stylized as subLOGIC) is an American software development company. It was formed in 1977 by Bruce Artwick, and incorporated in 1978 by Artwick's partner Stu Moment as Sublogic Communications Corporation. Sublogic is best known as the creator of the Flight Simulator series, later known as Microsoft Flight Simulator, but it also created other video games such as Night Mission Pinball, Football, and Adventure on a Boat; educational software; and an Apple II graphics library.

== History ==
Sublogic released the flight simulation program FS1 Flight Simulator for the Apple II and the TRS-80 in 1979, followed by the more popular and widely ported Flight Simulator II in 1983, and Jet in 1985.

In 1982, Flight Simulator was licensed to Microsoft, and through 2006 Microsoft released major updates to Microsoft Flight Simulator approximately every three years. A reboot of the series was announced in 2019, simply titled Microsoft Flight Simulator, released in 2020.

Sublogic also produced software other than flight simulators, including children's educational software, 3D graphics software for CP/M, the A2-3D1 animation library for the Apple II, the X-1 video card and 3D graphics software for IBM PC compatibles, and Night Mission Pinball (1982) which was originally for the Apple II and ported to the Atari 8-bit computers, Commodore 64, and MS-DOS.

=== Denouement ===
Bruce Artwick left Sublogic in 1988 to form BAO Ltd. (Bruce Artwick Organization), retaining the copyright to Flight Simulator, which they continued to develop. BAO and the copyright to Flight Simulator were acquired by Microsoft in December 1995.

After Artwick's departure, Sublogic continued under the ownership of Stu Moment, who produced Flight Assignment: A.T.P. in 1990. It specializes in simulating passenger airliners, using a scoring method to determine the performance of the user.

Sublogic began a new flight simulator, but in late 1995 was acquired by Sierra, which completed the program and released it as Pro Pilot in 1997.

Moment continues to run the present Sublogic Corporation as a generic simulation company, in addition to being an airshow display pilot with his Classic Airshow company.

== Games developed ==
Year	Title	Platform
1979	FS1 Flight Simulator	Apple II, TRS-80
1981	Saturn Navigator	Apple II
1981	Escape!	Apple II
1982	Zendar	Apple II
1982	Space Vikings	Apple II
1982	Microsoft Flight Simulator 1.0	IBM PC
1982	Night Mission Pinball	Apple II, Atari 8-bit, IBM PC, C64
1983	Flight Simulator II	Apple II, Atari 8-bit, C64, PC-98, Amiga, Atari ST, Tandy CoCo 3
1984	Microsoft Flight Simulator 2.0	IBM PC
1985	Jet	MS-DOS, Apple II, Amiga, Atari ST, Commodore 64, Mac OS, PC-98
1985	Scenery Disks: 1-6, Western U.S. Scenery Set	Atari 8-bit, C64, Apple II, MS-DOS
1986	Pure-Stat Baseball	Apple II, C64, MS-DOS
1986	Football	C64, MS-DOS
1986	Microsoft Flight Simulator	Mac OS
1986–1988	Scenery Disks: 7-12, Japan, Western European Tour	Apple II, Atari 8-bit, C64, MS-DOS, Amiga, Atari ST
1987	Jet: Version 2.0	MS-DOS
1988	Stealth Mission	C64
1988	Flight Simulator with Torpedo Attack	MSX, PC-88
1988	Microsoft Flight Simulator 3.0	MS-DOS
1989	Thunderchopper	MS-DOS
1989	Hawaiian Odyssey: Scenery Adventure	Amiga, Atari ST, C64, MS-DOS
1989	UFO	MS-DOS
1990	Flight Assignment: Airline Transport Pilot	MS-DOS
1991	New Facilities Locator	MS-DOS
1993	Flight Light	MS-DOS
1993	USA East, USA West	MS-DOS
1996	Flight Light Plus	MS-DOS

== See also ==
- History of Microsoft Flight Simulator
