= Bruce Artwick =

American software engineer

- Born: Bruce Arthur Artwick; January 1, 1953 (age 73); Norridge, Illinois, United States
- Education: University of Illinois
- Known for: Microsoft Flight Simulator

Bruce Arthur Artwick (born January 1, 1953) is an American software engineer. He is the creator of the first consumer flight simulator software. He founded Sublogic after graduating from the University of Illinois at Urbana–Champaign in 1977, and released the first version of Flight Simulator for the Apple II in 1979. His Apple II software was purchased by Microsoft in 1982 and became Microsoft Flight Simulator.

After Sublogic, Bruce founded the Bruce Artwick Organization, which continued development of flight simulator products and was eventually bought out by Microsoft.

== Early life and education ==
Artwick was born and raised in Norridge, Illinois, and attended Triton Junior College before transferring to University of Illinois at Urbana–Champaign to study computer engineering in 1973. When he arrived, Artwick first switched his focus to electrical engineering because he believed that the degree would be more acceptable to the public eye.

As a student at the University of Illinois, Artwick expressed his enthusiasm for aviation by doing research at the Aviation Research Lab. Artwick held a technician position in the DCL (Digital Computer Lab). Between 1975 and 1976, Artwick and his graphic group at the University designed graphic terminals for the DCL. During this time, Artwick found the time to become a pilot. The number of hours spent doing graphics led to a rich understanding of the topic. Artwick noted, "I learned more working in the basement of the DCL than in classes."

Artwick graduated with a bachelor's degree in electrical engineering in 1975 from the University of Illinois and obtained a master's degree in electrical engineering in the following year.

== Flight Simulator ==
In his thesis of May 1976, called “A versatile computer generated dynamic flight display”, he displayed a model of the flight of an aircraft on a computer screen. With this, Artwick proved that it was possible to use the 6800 microprocessor, which powered some of the first available microcomputers, to handle the graphics and calculations of the specifications needed to produce real-time flight simulation.

After establishing Sublogic in 1977, Artwick took his thesis one step further by developing the first flight simulator program for the Apple II, which was based on the 6502 microprocessor. He followed up the simulator with a Radio Shack TRS-80 version. By the year 1981, Flight Simulator became so popular that it was reportedly the best-selling title for Apple.

Shortly after, Microsoft decided to enter the fray to obtain a license for Flight Simulator. Microsoft obtained a joint license and by November 1982, Microsoft's version of Flight Simulator hit the stores as a PC entertainment program. As years passed, computer graphics continued to improve and Flight Simulator software also changed along with it.

== Sublogic ==
Bruce Artwick established Sublogic in October 1977. It was incorporated in April 1978 by Bruce's partner, Stu Moment. The business strategy of Sublogic was to sell software through the mail. The company found itself growing a substantial amount in just two years’ time and Artwick decided to move part of his operation back to Champaign-Urbana. Sublogic continued to grow and developed various versions of the flight simulator program as well as other entertainment programs. At the beginning of the year 1982, Flight Simulator became a top selling product for Apple who purchased the Flight Simulator product.

Microsoft recognized his expertise in the field of flight simulation and asked Artwick to partake in a project that would change the simulator industry. Instead of flight purposes, Microsoft wanted to showcase the machine's graphics capabilities. By the late 1980s, the Sublogic business started to decline because the 8-bit market shifted to a 16-bit market so Artwick decided to pursue other things and left Sublogic.

The name Sublogic came from logic circuits Artwick built for the PDP-11 in the University of Illinois' Digital Computer Laboratory (DCL).

== BAO Ltd. ==
In 1988, he left Sublogic and found BAO Ltd. (Bruce Artwick Organization), retaining the copyright to Flight Simulator, which he continued to develop. BAO started off with six employees and grew to over 30 by 1995. BAO continued to grow and oversaw development of many aviation products in many different versions on various systems. The market by this time expanded to include flight simulator products for the Federal Aviation Administration. It was there that BAO produced aviation-related software that would be implemented into things like tower control simulation to train air traffic controllers.

In 1994, BAO released Microsoft Space Simulator. In 1995, it released Tower, an air traffic control simulator.

In January 1995, BAO and the copyright to Flight Simulator were acquired by Microsoft. Artwick remained with the company as a consultant.

== See also ==
- Airfight flight simulator
