= Virtual airline (hobby) =

Hobby organization using flight simulation to model the operations of an airline

A virtual airline (VA) is a dedicated hobby organization that uses flight simulation to model the operations of an airline. Virtual airlines generally have a presence on the Internet, similar to a real airline. Many hundreds of virtual airlines of significance are currently active, with tens of thousands of participants involved at any one time.

== Purpose ==
Virtual airlines were started to give a sense of purpose to activities conducted within a flight simulator program, the first being SubLogic's Flight Assignment: A.T.P., released in 1990. As time has passed, the most common flight simulator used is Microsoft's Flight Simulator. This basic premise has evolved over time, along with available technology, to provide increasing levels of immersion but always with the same core purpose. When combined with increasingly powerful personal computers, advancing flight simulation software, and communications networks, virtual airlines are often able to provide compelling, realistic, experiences similar to operations inside a real airline. Virtual airlines also provide an avenue for members to gain access to additional content, such as aircraft and scenery, for use with their simulator. The appeal varies; for younger members, virtual airlines provide a sandbox realistic environment where they can experience the corporate environment of traditional commercial business in the airline industry, without the risk of financial loss. These organizations also provide an outlet for those who are interested in aviation but unable to fly themselves in real life due to financial, health, or other reasons. As of 2014, an estimated 80 percent of virtual pilots hold no real world pilot's license.

Academics have stated that members of these groups can often show significant attachment and immersion in their activity, building strong relationships with those who they share their created "space" with. Participants can become unusually dedicated and committed to their group through the forging of their strong bonds and sense of identity, despite the construct being entirely (or nearly entirely) fictional. Some of the groups are run similar to real-world airlines, and members can get a taste for being a professional pilot by joining one of the organizations. Commentators have described virtual aviation as giving Flight Simulators an interest and depth that they would otherwise not have.

=== Scientific and academic study ===
Virtual airlines have been used, both directly and indirectly, as part of research projects at universities in both aviation, modelling, and statistical theory development. It has been reported that interest in this area is increasing as of 2011, due mainly to advances in technology and the maturity of flight simulation as an industry. Enthusiasts are often of a technical background and welcome the opportunity to work with researchers, enhancing the suitability of the medium to support research initiatives.

== History ==
Virtual airlines are early examples of online gaming communities, many of the first virtual airlines can be traced back to the early 1990s in flight simulator forums of services such as Prodigy, CompuServe or America Online While at least the early history of virtual airlines is predominantly on IBM PC compatibles, Mac users also took part in the mid 1990s, with some of these still in operation today. Since they were first formed, these organizations are often characterized by their highly organized and structured nature when compared with other virtual groups in the gaming community. Such organizations represent some of the earliest examples of organized gaming groups similar to the clans and guilds seen in modern video gaming. It has been proposed that virtual airlines have existed since the creation of the first flight simulators, therefore predating the Internet.

Rapid growth in popularity of virtual airlines was experienced just prior to and through the new millennium. During this time, they were considered to be an immensely popular hobby often noted for how seriously it was taken by its participants. Since the rapid development of the massively multiplayer online game (MMOG) genre, virtual airlines and online flight simulation in general have seen much greater competition for participation and membership.

Given their origins through the early Internet, these organizations have often been early adopters of technology to enhance the online experience. This technology includes online databasing and multiplayer networks such as the Virtual Air Traffic Simulation Network (VATSIM), International Virtual Aviation Organization (IVAO), SkySimFlight or FSLive. Developments have tended towards more integration between Internet websites, the simulation software such as those in the Microsoft Flight Simulator series, multiplayer networks, and flight recording systems. It is believed that increased integration across these mediums provides a more immersive experience that enhances gameplay, being the primary reason for people to join the virtual groups. Commentators have described virtual aviation as giving Flight Simulators an interest and depth that they would otherwise not have. While virtual airlines are not real, since the flights only happen inside of a computer, they are considered a serious hobby that has appeal among a very wide age range of participants, with the average age of participants increasing.

== Platforms ==
A flight simulator (usually running on a personal computer) is required for the actual conduct of operations by organization members. There are several platforms that are typically used to conduct virtual airline operations, although by definition almost any flight simulator can be utilized by such an organization. Common simulators include: (Italicized links represent free or open-source simulators)

- X-Plane
- Lockheed Martin Prepar3D
- FlightGear
- Flight Simulator 2004: A Century of Flight
- Flight Simulator X
- Microsoft Flight Simulator
- Infinite Flight (Mobile)
- YSFlight
- Microsoft Flight Simulator 2020
- Roblox (nicknamed Ro-Av)

== Types ==
=== Fictionally based ===
Virtual airlines may be organizations that are created with no ties to any real world entity. These organizations are fictional constructs of the participants, who use the roleplaying environment of the group to add a sense of immersion to the gaming activity. These types of virtual airlines are indeed the most commonly seen. Without basis on a real world entity, fictional virtual airlines are varied in their scope of both route and aircraft fleet.

=== Real-world ===
Other virtual airlines are based on real airlines, from major carriers to small operators. These virtual airlines tend to closely follow their real world counterparts in terms of aircraft fleet and routes offered. While there are examples of controversy over copyright issues, the real airline companies tend to allow similarly named virtual airlines to participate within player communities.

=== Military ===
Virtual military and paramilitary organizations often operate in a similar way to virtual airlines, but using military aircraft and ranking systems. Organizations such as VATSIM have strict regulations around the operation of such organizations within the network. Virtual militaries often specialize in one area, such as naval aviation, although there are some organizations that extend across multiple areas of military aviation and sometimes into other areas such as land and maritime operations. Virtual flying clubs are less structured and generally smaller than other forms of virtual airlines, operating in much the same was as real world Flying Clubs operate. It has been proposed that such clubs have a smaller scale than others and place a heavy emphasis on social interaction.

== Operation ==
Technology has improved since the introduction of BBS-operated virtual airlines, allowing a wider variety of tools and resources available to virtual pilots, enhancing realism of flight simulation. Pilots can now fly online using networks such as VATSIM, IVAO or Virtual Skies. While connected to the network, pilots can see other aircraft, hear and respond to air traffic control and see weather conditions that parallel the real-world weather at their plane's location. Using these services, most virtual airlines regularly host online events where virtual pilots can participate in group flights with hundreds of other pilots.

Some even simulate real-world airlines to the point where flight dispatching and fictional salary are part of the virtual airline's basic operations, as well as calculating operating costs and the full range of financial data used to manage airlines in the real world. It is common for the virtual airline to offer its members set flight routes to operate, with the offer of receiving awards and promotions as a result.

=== Website and forum ===
There are several elements that are common across many virtual airlines but none more so than a website as the focal point of the community, typically including an Internet forum where discussion and social interaction can occur. Sometimes the community is solely based on an internet forum that is part of a flight simulation forum in general, such as Flightsim.com. From the early 21st century it became more common for virtual airlines to feature an Online database for recording and reporting flights and membership statistics. This functionality has steadily expanded in line with that of other virtual communities such as gaming clans. Flight simulation, and virtual airlines in particular, have been reported as an early adopter of new web technologies.

=== Flight assignment ===
It is common for virtual airlines to provide a list of flights that can be completed by members. Each flight is considered a route as part of the virtual airline's scheduled flights. This functions in much the same way as a real airline functions, whereby they publish a list of the flights that customers can book flights on. In some virtual airlines the members can fly whichever flights they want, others the management has to assign them those flights, and in others it is possible to bid for routes they want to fly. International flights are, by virtue of the distance traveled, much longer than domestic routes and typically only available to senior members.

=== Award and ranking systems ===
Most virtual airlines have a specific ranking system for their pilots, that tend to involve restricting which airplanes the member is allowed to fly. Pilots complete flights for their airline, using their simulator, either online (using a network such as VATSIM) or offline, and then file a pilot report. A key aspect of these pilot reports is logging the number of hours flown, which directly affects the members promotion to other ranks. Ranking systems used typically use terminology associated with commercial aviation, such as designating senior pilots as captain. Commercial aircraft have flight crew consisting of several people, whereas in flight simulation it is rare for individual aircraft to have more than one person piloting it, therefore rank distinctions are focused on the members efforts within the organization rather than their seniority on board an individual aircraft.

Members may be motivated to complete flights in order to qualify for awards or certificates, either from completing specific routes (commonly referred to as tours in this context), or from a total number of hours completed either overall or on a specific type of aircraft. In such circumstances, profiles are provided for pilots where others can see their accomplishments and an overall roster displays an individual's performance among others in the group.

=== Airline hubs ===
When a virtual airline grows to a point where managing their operations becomes difficult, the airline might subdivide into smaller groups, called a hub. The concept is similar to pilot bases in real-world airlines where pilots are grouped together at a major airport to start and end a series of flights, under the direction of a hub manager. Virtual airlines based on airlines that really exist commonly provide hubs associated with what would be expected in the real world, and follow their schedules as closely as possible.

=== Livery ===
It is common for pilots to be given custom aircraft files and repaints with customized livery of the airline, usually made internally by virtual airline members. In real-world airlines such a livery serves as an advertisement, establishes a sense of pride, and functions as a method for recognizing aircraft. Using Microsoft Flight Simulator the custom livery can only be seen online if other participants have installed it or use specially developed tools for model matching, such as FLAi by the Boston Virtual ARTCC, therefore the benefit is largely for the individual and their sense of realism. Liveries can be hosted on the website of the virtual airline, or more commonly provided publicly on a flight simulation site such as Flightsim.com or Avsim.com. This enables the livery to be downloaded by general flight simulation participants rather than just those involved in the airline.

=== Communication ===
Voice over Internet Protocol (such as TeamSpeak or Ventrillo) servers are commonly provided for members to communicate freely by voice. Participants may use Direct IP Connectivity to locate other players and communication, at least initially, is conducted by text chat. As with other online communities participants utilize chat software such as MSN Messenger, ICQ, Discord, and formerly Skype to connect with other members, who may be distributed anywhere in the world. As of 2011, Microsoft Flight Simulator X is the only platform with a communication system embedded within its software, beyond text chat.

=== Multiplayer events ===
Providing opportunities for members to participate in flights together is a key aspect of being a virtual airline member. Events are held on a game network such as VATSIM, Virtual-Skies or IVAO, through a peer-to-peer multiplayer game, or on a dedicated server run by the virtual airline.

=== Flight statistics and tracking ===
In the 1990s virtual airlines utilized manual processes for reporting flights and tracking statistics for members, progressing through to online databases in 2000, and since 2010 the trend has been towards automated flight statistics integrated into the flight simulation software. One of these automated systems is the ACARS system, first introduced by SATA Virtual in 1999. Pilots complete their flight, say in Microsoft Flight Simulator, while connected to the internet and the software tracks the flight as well as the pilots actions. At the completion of the flight the data is sent to the virtual airlines server and then processed into the online database. This has streamlined participation and opened up new avenues for statistics and tracking, enhancing realism for those involved.

== Controversies ==
=== Copyright issues ===
When a real-world airline is created in the image of a virtual airline, legal issues can arise out of copyright violations. In 2003, a real world airline, Qantas, announced a new low-cost carrier by the name of Jetstar Airways. However, a virtual airline named Jetstar International Airlines already existed, complete with a web site. As part of their startup promotion, Qantas sold 100,000 airline tickets at a discount price, and the virtual airline's web site was swamped with would-be customers, job-seekers, and prospective vendors. The virtual airline sued Qantas, claiming that Qantas stole the virtual airline's livery and trademark. The matter was settled out of court for an undisclosed sum.

=== Association with terrorism ===
Claims have been made of the use of both flight simulators and virtual airlines as training devices for terrorist activities, although to date no conclusive link has ever been provided to indicate a situation where a virtual airline has provided flight simulation training to anyone involved in a terrorist activity.

Jermaine Lindsay, one of the four terrorists involved in the 7 July 2005 London bombings, may have used flight simulators to practice flying an airliner, with an accusation that he was registered with a virtual airline. A person of the same name listed his nearest major airport as Heathrow and clocked up 30 hours in two months with SimAirline.net. The website later denied the member's linking with the bombing, and indicated it was working with the Metropolitan Police to establish whether its former member was the bomber. The website stated that it provides information about airlines and free add-on software for Microsoft Flight Simulator and does not provide flight instruction to its members.

The 9/11 Commission in the US concluded in 2004 that those responsible for flying the planes into World Trade Center and The Pentagon had used PC-based flight simulators for training. Despite the initial concerns of the involvement of virtual airlines in these terrorist activities, largely little has come from these claims to date and no changes have been noted as occurring in their operation as a result.
