= List of free flight simulators =

The following are flight simulator software applications that can be downloaded or played for free. Several items are outdated. Please notice 'free' is not the same as open source. Free games may have limited options or include advertisements.

== Examples ==
- 1942: The Pacific Air War
- Ace Combat
- Ace Combat Infinity (shut down in 2018; no longer available)
- Ace Combat: Assault Horizon (demo; no longer available)
- Air Warrior
- B-17 Flying Fortress (possibly not still available)
- Chuck Yeager's Advanced Flight Trainer
- CRRCSim
- DARWARS
- Digital Combat Simulator
- Dogfights: The Game
- Falcon 4.0 (see FreeFalcon)
- FlightGear
- GeoFS
- Gunship 2000
- Linux Air Combat
- Maestro
- MusicVR
- Microsoft Flight
- Pie in the sky (game engine)
- Red Baron
- Rise of Flight: The First Great Air War
- Second Life
- SGI Dogfight
- SimCopterssl
- Space Combat
- Top Gun (see: List of Top Gun video games)
- Tres Lunas
- Virtual Military
- War Thunder
- World of Warplanes
- World War II Online
- youbeQ
- YSFlight
- zeseay
- Turboprop Flight Simulator
- Wings of Steel
