= International Virtual Aviation Organisation =

Non-profit flight simulation network

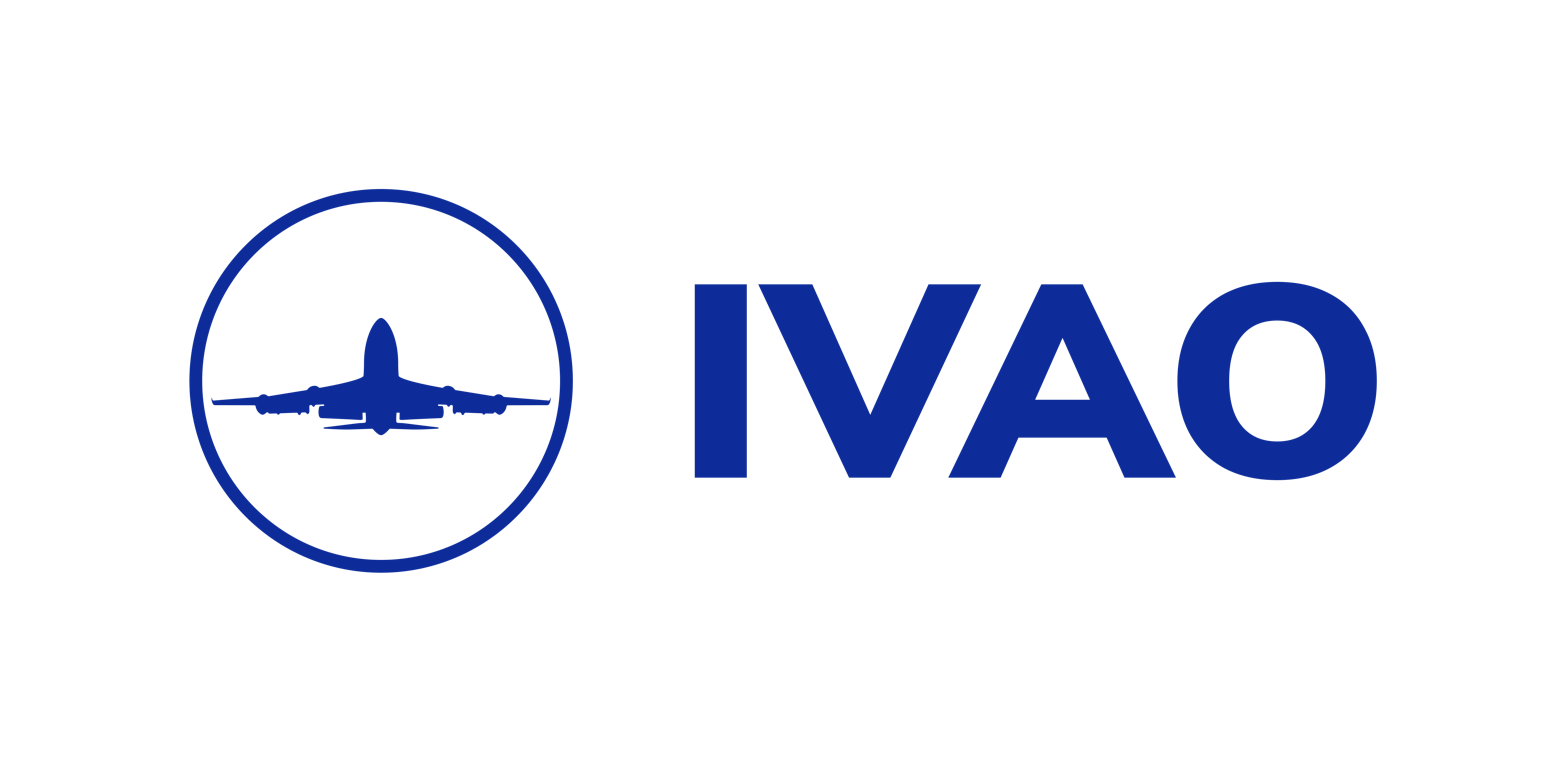
- Abbreviation: IVAO VzW
- Formation: December 16, 1998; 27 years ago
- Type: Nonprofit organisation
- Services: Free, open to the public
- Members: 250,000+
- President: Ralph Henschen
- Vice President: Tom Gilmore
- Board of Governors: Ralph Henschen (President & Treasurer & Senior Training Advisor 5); Tom Gilmore (Vice President & Treasurer & Senior Training Advisor 5); Tom Gilmore (Secretary & Public Relations Officer); Zoltan Gyenge (Data Protection Officer); Adrian Maximo (Assistant Secretary & Assistant Data Protection Officer); Jacques Mariens
- Main organ: General Assembly, Board of Governors, Executive Council
- Budget: €15,000
- Staff: 818
- Website: https://ivao.aero

International Virtual Aviation Organisation VZW (IVAO) is a non-profit association which operates a free-of-charge online flight-simulation network. Following free registration users can connect to the IVAO Network (IVAN) either as a virtual air traffic controller or as a virtual pilot and interact with each other in a large multiplayer environment utilising real-world aviation procedures, phraseology, and techniques.

== Overview ==
IVAO has over 250,000 registered members and is considered one of the largest online flight simulation networks. It allows users to act as either a virtual pilot or an air traffic controller.

IVAO relies solely on their own software. Air traffic controllers can connect to the IVAO network using IVAO's radar client Aurora, which emulates the interface of a modern, real-world air traffic control radar scope. Pilots can connect using their flight simulator and the pilot client, Altitude. Both pilots and controllers interact on a single world environment, aiming to simulate air traffic on an "as real as it gets" basis.

IVAO is split into regional divisions, which manage day-to-day operations in a specific section of the virtual world (usually a country or set of countries).

IVAO logs all flight and controlling hours and offers its members opportunities to obtain virtual pilot and ATC ranks by undergoing training and passing theoretical and practical exams based around real-world aviation regulations and procedures. IVAO's Virtual Airline (VA) system offers virtual airlines the ability to operate on the network with fictional airline call signs and liveries.

Events and gatherings are organised regularly by divisions or members. IVAO has approximately 3,500 connections per day and an average weekday peak between 700 and 1,500 simultaneous connections, and reached its current simultaneous connection record during a "Crowded Skies" event on 8 December 2024, with 6,000 members flying or controlling at the same time.

== Structure ==
IVAO is a registered not-for-profit organisation (NPO) under Belgian law and is governed by multiple separate structures. The network is free for all members and there are no fees associated with accessing it—they run solely off donations. The organisation's budget is over €15,000 per year.

=== General Assembly ===
The General Assembly is a group of IVAO users legally registered as members of the NPO. They have various roles, including appointing and removing members of the Board of Governors, approving of the annual budget, and managing the legal status of the organisation.

=== Board of Governors ===
The Board of Governors (BoG) are the legal governors for IVAO, appointed by the General Assembly on a two-year term, after which they can be re-elected. Their roles include appointing and removing members from the Executive Council, setting a high-level strategic goal for the organisation, representing the organisation in legal matters, and other management of the NPO.

It is currently headed by the President, Eric Olsen.

=== Executive Council ===
The Executive staff is responsible for the day-to-day operations of IVAO, and general oversight of the organisation. Their roles include:

- Implementing tasks set out by the BoG
- Managing IVAO supervisors—the moderators on the network
- Managing staff for specific departments
- Managing senior divisional staff (director and assistant director)
- Managing major divisional issues

They are appointed by the BoG.

=== Departments ===
Day-to-day management of IVAO is split into multiple departments, each with their own director and assistant director, and often advisors or other support staff. These departments include Training, Membership, Public Relations, ATC Operations, Flight Operations, Special Operations, Events, World Tours, and Development Operations.

=== Divisions ===
IVAO is organised into multiple divisions, each representing a specific region (usually a country or set of countries). Each IVAO member is required to select a division when joining the network, and each division has its own set of staff that manage internal issues. As of December 2025, IVAO has 55 registered divisions. Brazil is the largest with over 3,445 active members.

== Membership and training ==
As of August 2025, IVAO has over 250,000 registered members, though many of these are not active.

IVAO has various ratings for both pilots and air traffic controllers, indicating different levels of training. Most ratings require one or more examinations (either theoretical or practical) in order to upgrade. Ratings are sequential—a previous rating must have been earned in order to upgrade for the next one. All ratings are optional, though some provide extra access, such as controlling specific ATC positions. Rating requirements for positions is mostly left to the specific divisions, but the main organisation does provide some guidance, which it recommends that most divisions adopt.

The pilot ratings IVAO offers include:

- Basic Flight Student (FS1) — Automatically issued to all users when registering for IVAO.
- Flight Student (FS2) — Automatically issued to any user who completes 10 flying hours on IVAO.
- Advanced Flight Student (FS3) — Automatically issued after completing 25 flying hours on IVAO and a short theoretical exam on Altitude.
- Senior Private Pilot (SPP) — Issued after completing 100 flying hours on IVAO, a theoretical exam, and a practical exam with an examiner.
- Commercial Pilot (CP) — Issued after completing 200 flying hours on IVAO, a theoretical exam, and a practical exam with an examiner.
- Airline Transport Pilot (ATP) — Issued after completing 750 flying hours on IVAO, a theoretical exam, and a practical exam with an examiner.
- Senior Flight Instructor (SFI) — A special rating only given to experienced HQ instructors and examiners by the Training Director / Training Assistant Director.
- Chief Flight Instructor (CFI) — A special rating given to only the Training Director and Training Assistant Director. Kept after retirement.

Most IVAO divisions do not require air traffic controllers to undergo training before controlling aircraft on the network, although restrictions may be in place until training has been taken (such as only being able to access specific airports and positions).

The ATC ratings that IVAO offers include:

- ATC Applicant (AS1) — Automatically issued to all users when registering for IVAO. Typically allows access to control on small aerodromes on the Ground (GND) or Clearance Delivery (DEL) positions.
- ATC Trainee (AS2) — Automatically issued to any user who completes 10 controlling hours on IVAO. Typically allows access to control medium aerodromes as DEL, GND, or Tower (TWR).
- Advanced ATC Trainee (AS3) — Automatically issued after completing 25 controlling hours on IVAO and a short theoretical exam on Aurora. Typically allows access to control larger aerodromes as DEL, GND, or TWR, as well as some simpler Approach (APP) positions.
- Aerodrome Controller (ADC) — Issued after completing 50 controlling hours on IVAO, a theoretical exam, and a practical exam with an examiner. Typically allows access to control simple APP and Centre (CTR) positions.
- Approach Controller (APC) — Issued after completing 100 controlling hours on IVAO, a theoretical exam, and a practical exam with an examiner. Typically allows access to control complex APP and Terminal Manoeuvring Area (TMA) positions during peak traffic hours.
- Centre Controller (ACC) — Issued after completing 200 controlling hours on IVAO, a theoretical exam, and a practical exam with an examiner. Typically allows access to complex CTR positions and all other positions on the network.
- Senior Controller (SEC) — Issued after completing 1000 controlling hours on IVAO, a theoretical exam, and a practical exam with an examiner. The rating does not come with any extra privileges and few controllers hold this rating.
- Senior ATC Instructor (SAI) — A special rating only given to experienced HQ instructors and examiners by the Training Director / Training Assistant Director.
- Chief ATC Instructor (CAI) — A special rating given to only the Training Director and Training Assistant Director. Kept after retirement.

A member may hold an ATC and pilot rating at the same time. Air Traffic Controllers are only able to control positions within their own division, unless they earn a Guest Controller Approval (GCA) in another division (usually requires a validation session with an examiner).

== Software ==
IVAO currently operates and maintains four pieces of software to access and run IVAN.

=== Pilot Software ===
==== Altitude ====
The primary pilot client is Altitude. Altitude connects flight simulators to IVAO, allowing members to fly aircraft on the network. As of August 2025, Altitude supports MSFS 2024, MSFS 2020, FSX, FS9, X-Plane Versions 12-8, and Prepar3D.

Altitude was released on 22 December 2019, originally supporting only Windows. On 8 October 2022, Aurora for Mac and Linux entered into open beta.

==== IvAp ====
IVAO's previous pilot client was IvAp, released on 3 June 2005. Another version, X-IvAp existed to support X-Plane. On 10 January 2025, it was announced that support for IvAp connections to IVAN would be withdrawn on 31 January 2025, as Altitude already accounted for 98.1% of pilot connections.

=== Air Traffic Controller Software ===
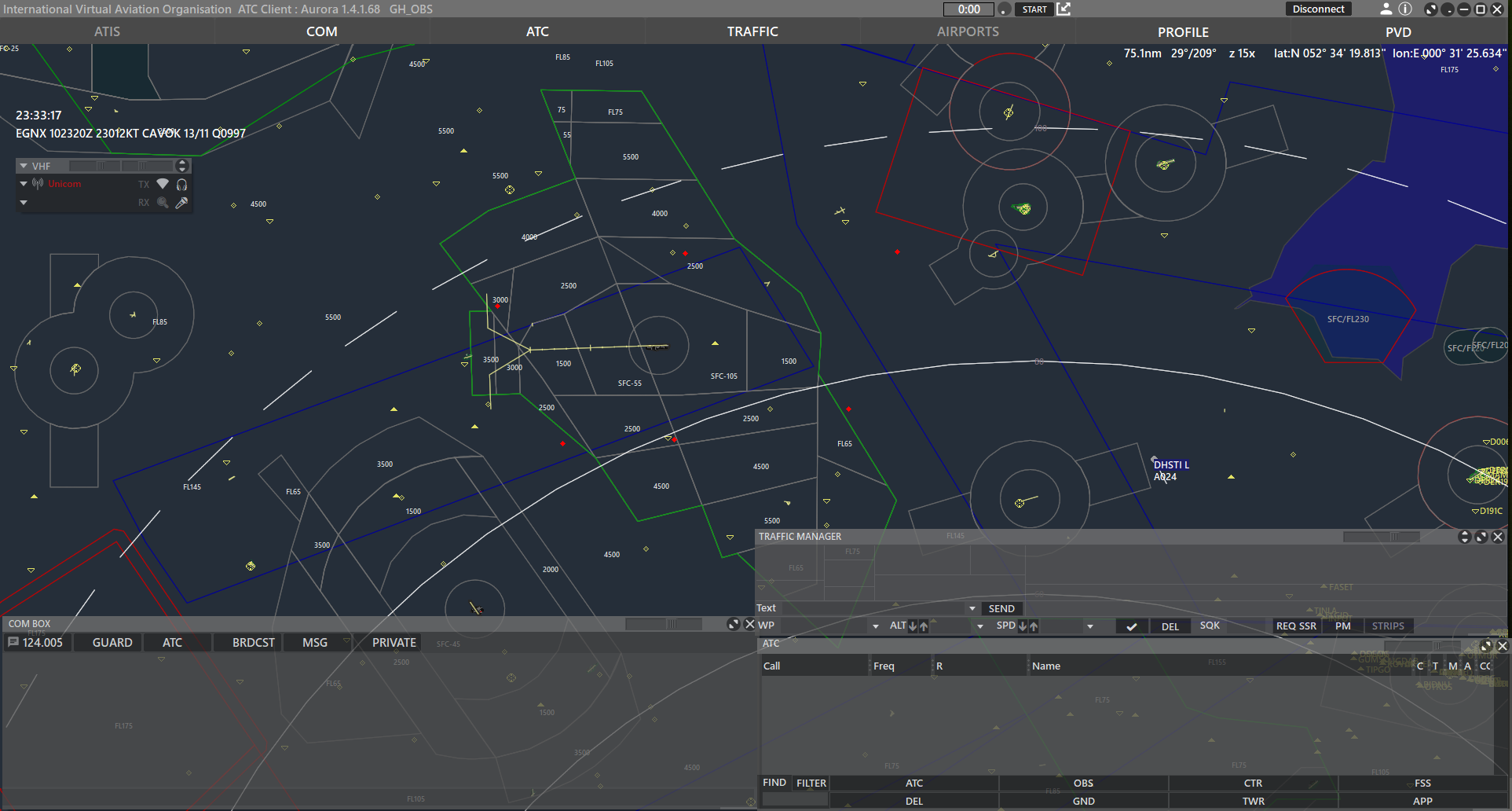
Screenshot of Aurora. The user is connected as an observer, viewing UK airspace.

==== Aurora ====
The primary air traffic control client is Aurora. Aurora provides a radar scope and voice functionality that allows members to control other pilots connected to IVAO. It currently supports Windows, Linux, and Mac (including Apple silicon).

Aurora was released on 21 December 2019 following an alpha-testing phase.

==== IvAc ====
IvAc was IVAO's previous air traffic controller client. On 10 January 2025, it was announced that support for IvAc (and IvAc 2) connections to IVAN would be withdrawn on 31 January 2025, as Aurora already accounted for 97.9% of controller connections.

=== Connector Software ===
==== Artifice ====
IVAO's Artifice allows members to string together multiple pieces of IVAO software (Aurora, Altitude, etc) into a single IVAN connection. This allows for use-cases such as controlling using Aurora while using Altitude and a flight simulator to provide a "tower view".

=== Server Software ===
==== FSD ====
FSD was a simple flight simulator multiplayer server which first innovated from one-to-one communication (one ATC and one aircraft) to a many-to-many environment. It was released in the mid-1990s. It was operated before IVAO formed, under SATCO.

==== SHARD ====
SHARD was a modified FSD server that IVAO, once formed, used up until 30 April 2022. The SHARD servers had displayed technical issues, crashed multiple times during large events, which eventually led to their replacement.

In March 2020, during a Global Online Day, an event designed to encourage online flying during the COVID-19 pandemic, the SHARD experienced issues handling the large (but expected) amount of connections, crashing various times.

During the "Crowded Skies" event in December 2021, IVAO's servers were unable to handle large numbers of connections, causing widespread disappointment from users.

==== World Server ====
World Server is the current server that IVAO operates. It's scalable and supports larger amounts of connections at generally higher reliability. World Server was initially announced on 31 March 2022, and a testing environment was opened on 1 April 2022. The servers were fully released and replaced the older SHARD servers on 30 April 2022.

== History ==
SATCO (now VATSIM) was the first large network to create an online air traffic simulation environment. It operated using SquawkBox and ProController in the mid-1990s, two programs that connected to the FSD server. On 16 December 1998, IVAO was founded when a group of members left SATCO to form a new network after managerial conflicts developed.

In late 2005, another managerial conflict, this time within the IVAO organisation itself, led to a further split. The incumbent president of IVAO left with IVAO.org, while other members of management continued the organisation under IVAO.aero. IVAO.org collapsed shortly afterwards.

In 2007, IVAO was officially registered as a non-profit organisation under Belgian law.

IVAO ran an online magazine called Virtual Sky from 2008 until 2016.

IVAO has taken part in FlightSimCon 2013, 2014, 2015 and 2016. In 2021, the North American Division of IVAO represented the network at FlightSimExpo.

On 1 September 2015, IVAO was formally classified as an advertising bureau and became subject to VAT from the 1st October 2015.

On 21 December 2019, IVAO launched Aurora, their new controller client. The following day, they released Altitude, their pilot client, and Artifice, their connector.

On 1 August 2022, Voice ATIS was released to IVAO users after the final round of internal testing. As opposed to text-only ATIS, Voice ATIS provides a more life-like simulation experience.

On 5 September 2022, IVAO announced that it was compatible with the imminent release of X-Plane 12.

On 11 November 2022, Voice UNICOM was released for Altitude, providing a common frequency (122.8) for pilots to announce their intentions to others when not under control of ATC.

On 16 December 2022, IVAO announced the release of their new Creator Partnership Programme which aims to provide content creators additional tools and exposure.

In 2023, IVAO marked its 25th anniversary.

On 28 August 2023, IVAO updated their theoretical examinations software to reflect their new controller and pilot clients—Aurora and Altitude.

On 13 November 2024, IVAO announced that it was compatible with the imminent release of Microsoft Flight Simulator 2024.

== Security breaches ==
In February 2021, a global password reset was issued to all users due to an "unauthorised use of privileged access to IVAO web systems" which led to a security breach that affected its staff members. IVAO claims that this incident did not impact normal users.

On 3 April 2022, IVAO's main website and other server services provided by IVAO became unavailable to the public. Three days later, IVAO revealed that they were targeted by a ransomware attack which was able to access its database due to an outdated piece of code in its main website. This led to a security breach and the data stored on its servers were encrypted. The attackers requested a ramsom, which IVAO refused to pay, instead recovering from a backup. IVAO claimed that no user data was gathered by its attackers. As soon as IVAO published its statement regarding the ransomware attack, a DDoS attack was launched against the websites that had been recovered.
