= Virtual airline =

Virtual airline may refer to:

- Virtual airline (economics), an airline that has outsourced as many possible operational and business functions as it can
- Virtual airline (hobby), a dedicated hobby organization that uses flight simulation to model the operations of an airline
