= Microsoft Flight Simulator X: Acceleration =

Flight simulation computer game

Microsoft Flight Simulator X
- Developer: Aces Game Studio
- Publisher: Microsoft Game Studios
- Series: Microsoft Flight Simulator
- Platform: Microsoft Windows
- Release: EU: November 2, 2007; NA: October 23, 2007
- Genre: Flight simulation
- Modes: Single-player, multiplayer

Microsoft Flight Simulator X: Acceleration is a 2007 expansion pack for the 2006 flight simulation video game Microsoft Flight Simulator X, developed by Aces Game Studio and published by Microsoft Game Studios for Windows.

== Gameplay ==
Acceleration introduces new features to Flight Simulator X, including 30 new single-player and 19 multiplayer missions, three new aircraft: the F/A-18A Hornet, EH-101 helicopter and the P-51D Mustang, and new scenery enhancements for sites including Berlin, Istanbul, Cape Canaveral and the Edwards Air Force Base.

== Reception ==
Reception

Review scores
Publication	Score
Eurogamer	7/10
GameSpot	8.5
IGN	8.2
PC PowerPlay	8/10
PC Zone	76

Reception for Acceleration was positive, with praise singled out for the design of the new missions. Steve Butts of IGN praised the missions as "every bit as exciting and enjoyable as those in the original game", praising their challenge and variety. PC Zone similarly praised the "drastically different" missions, noting the novel use of catapults and winches.

Reviewers noted the visual improvements to the game. Steve Butts of IGN noted "the visuals are amazing" and "the few new assets definitely fit well with the game's existing assets". James Reid of PC Powerplay praised the minimal performance cost of the enhanced graphics, stating "some improvement in the quality of rendering of scenery, aircraft and other graphic features".

Some reviewers encountered bugs and performance issues. Oliver Clare of Eurogamer noted "small issues with 3rd-party content after install" and the number of "lock-up and crash reports on FSX forums since release".
