= Virtual Air Traffic Simulation Network =

Virtual flight-simulation network

- Abbreviation: VATSIM
- Formation: July 2001; 25 years ago
- Type: Nonprofit organization
- Purpose: Provide an online air traffic control and flying community for aviation enthusiasts
- Region served: Worldwide
- Members: >2,000,000 (190,000 active in the last 6 months)
- President: Don Desfosse
- Main organ: Board of Governors
- Staff: 300+
- Website: www.vatsim.net

Virtual Air Traffic Simulation Network (VATSIM) is a nonprofit organization that operates an online flight-simulation network noted for its active membership and realism. Users are able to connect to VATSIM and fly aircraft as a pilot, or direct traffic as an air traffic controller in what has been described as a close approximation of real-life aviation procedures.

== Overview ==
Communications between pilots and controllers are carried out using integrated VoIP or in-game text messages. Users are required to use custom software, designated as approved clients, in order to connect to the simulation.

The main organs of the network consist of the Board of Governors, three of whom are responsible for one of the three geographic regions - namely, the Europe, Middle East and Africa region, the Asia-Pacific region, and the Americas region, referred to as EMEA, APAC and AMAS. These regions are further subdivided into divisions, some of which further divide into virtual area control centers, and virtual air route traffic control centers. Operating procedures within each area reflect local standards.

The network also has a volunteer team of supervisors that help those who may need assistance in flying on the network and also help resolve reports of other fellow users breaking the VATSIM Code of Conduct. Upon registering for the VATSIM network, new users have to undertake an entry-level test about basic piloting skills and about the rules of the network. This was introduced on September 1, 2020, alongside a further restructuring of the pilot rating system to teach VATSIM users how to properly use the network and reduce the number of cases of pilots connecting without knowing what to do in busy airspace, causing disruption and frustration for some controllers. An update to this system was implemented in early 2025 as the "New Member Orientation Course", which replaced the older system of initial training for new members.

Because the simulation adheres as closely as possible to real-life aviation procedures and radio phraseology, VATSIM can function as a training aid for student pilots lacking experience and private and commercial pilots looking to enhance their skills in radio communications. Events in the simulation are not hard coded on the network but rather emerge through human interaction and error. Consequently, the network has been described as bringing immersion to what was historically a solitary exercise and credited with playing a key role in the commodification of flight-simulation software.

== History ==
=== Formation of VATSIM ===
Spearheaded by Harvey Stein, the founding of VATSIM was announced on July 12, 2001, following the dissolution of the Simulated Air Traffic Controllers Organization (SATCO). This occurred after the founding of another network, IVAO, which was more European-oriented, unlike SATCO, which was more American-oriented. The board drew up terms of agreement with Randy Whistler, the then President of SATCO, declaring VATSIM the official successor of SATCO.

In 2020, VATSIM announced it had achieved 100,000 active users for the first time, an increase of 20,000 users in two years.

=== SquawkBox and ProController ===
The advent of the Internet in the mid-1990s enabled users of modern flight simulators to fly together using multiplayer functionality. In 1997, SquawkBox was created by Jason Grooms as an add-on for Microsoft Flight Simulator 95, enhancing the built-in multiplayer features to allow large numbers of players to connect to the game. ProController, a radar-simulation program also developed by Jason Grooms, was created in the same year to connect virtual pilots with virtual controllers. The FSD Server was created by Marty Bochane to provide the signaling infrastructure and logic required to integrate ProController and Squawkbox, enabling users to fly in real-world weather conditions. ProController was retired as an approved ATC client on March 13, 2004.

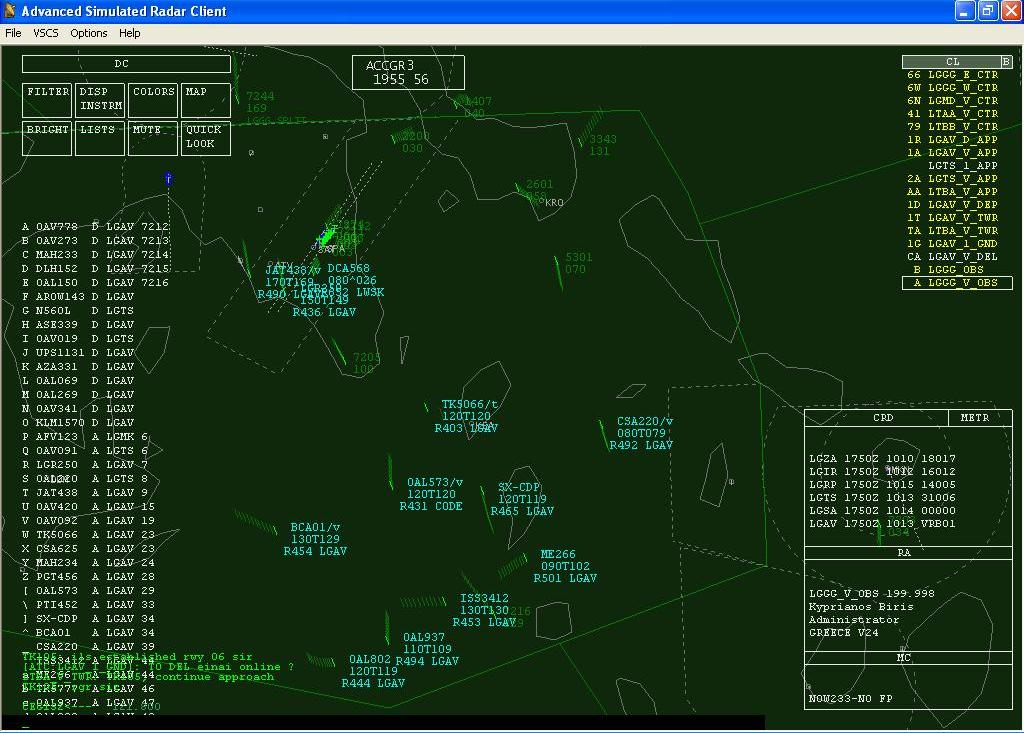
Screenshot of the ASRC (Advanced Simulated Radar Client) program that was used by ATC on VATSIM

=== ASRC and Roger Wilco ===
Sometime in 2002, ProController was slowly being phased out in favour of ASRC (Advanced Simulated Radar Client), created by Mike Evans and David Hendleman, and was released to the public in early 2003. Alongside that, Roger Wilco was used to facilitate voice communications between pilots and ATC, with ATC denoting that voice communications were available with them with the callsign format XXXX_V_TWR, alongside putting their voice server IP and voice room name in their ATIS. Later, however, Roger Wilco was phased out in favour of the Advanced Voice Client, which required VATSIM authentication to prevent any non-VATSIM users from logging into the voice servers.

The ASRC software was retired as an ATC client on April 1, 2021, due to its not being in active development, which will make it incompatible with fast position updates that will be brought with VATSIM Velocity.

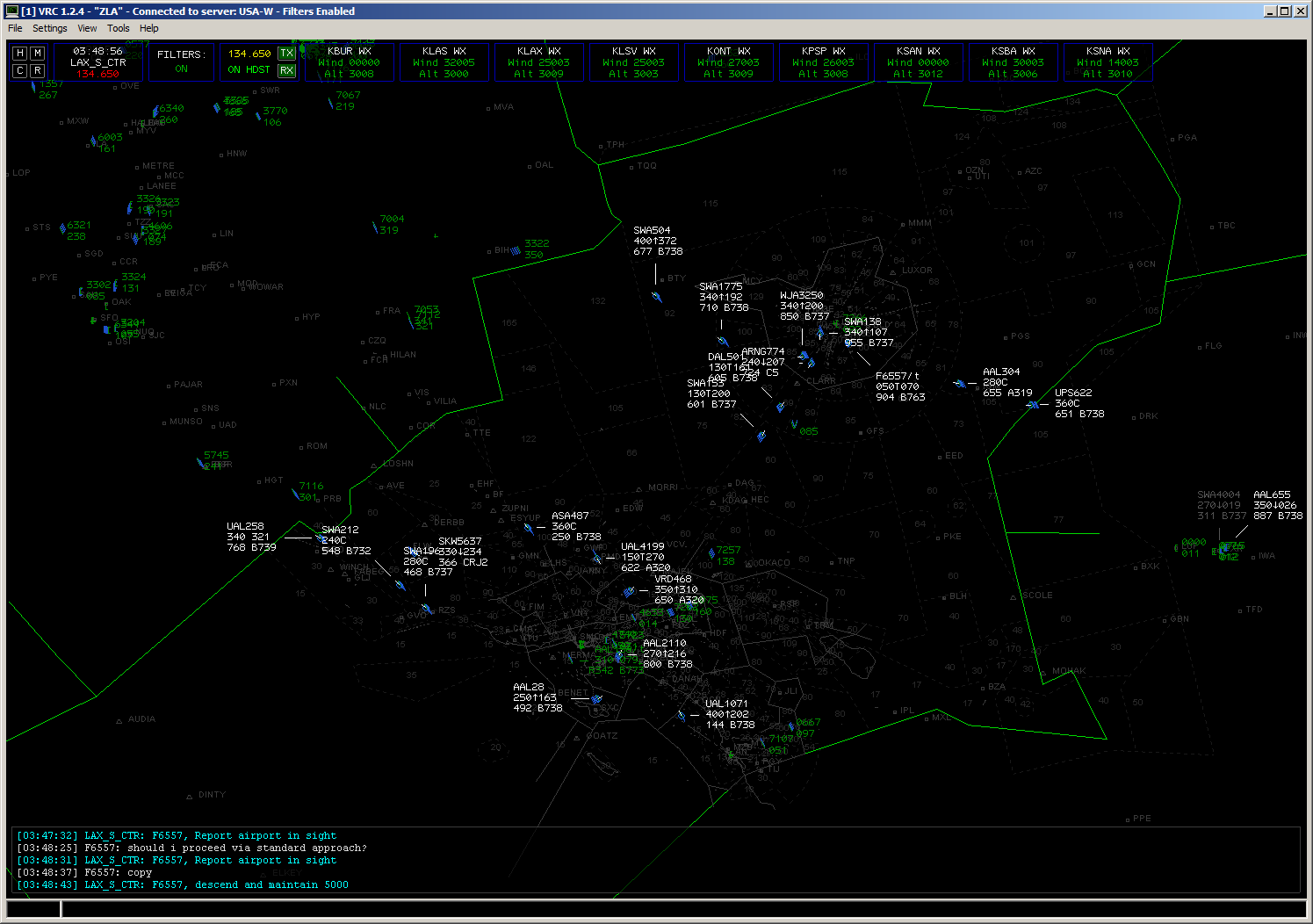
Screenshot of the Virtual Radar Client (VRC) software used by some air traffic controllers on VATSIM

On March 27, 2005, an alternative add-on to FS2002/FS2004 and FSX called FSInn was approved for use on the VATSIM network alongside SquawkBox.

=== Air traffic controller clients ===
On April 17, 2006, the Virtual Radar Client (VRC) was approved for use on the VATSIM network. Created by Ross Carlson, it was mainly used in the American and Oceanic regions, due to its easy setup, but comes with a lack of customizability. After being replaced by the Consolidated Radar Client (CRC) in October, 2023, VRC is no longer the primary controller client for VATUSA controllers. It is now mainly used by network supervisors and controllers in other divisions.

On September 15, 2007, the EuroScope ATC client was approved for use on the VATSIM network. Created by Gergely Csernák, the client is reported to be the most used ATC client on VATSIM, due to its custom plugin support, realistic radar screens, and automatic controller coordination. It is designed to integrate with other ATC clients like VRC, vSTARS, and vERAM, however. It is generally used mostly in the Europe, Asia and South American regions.

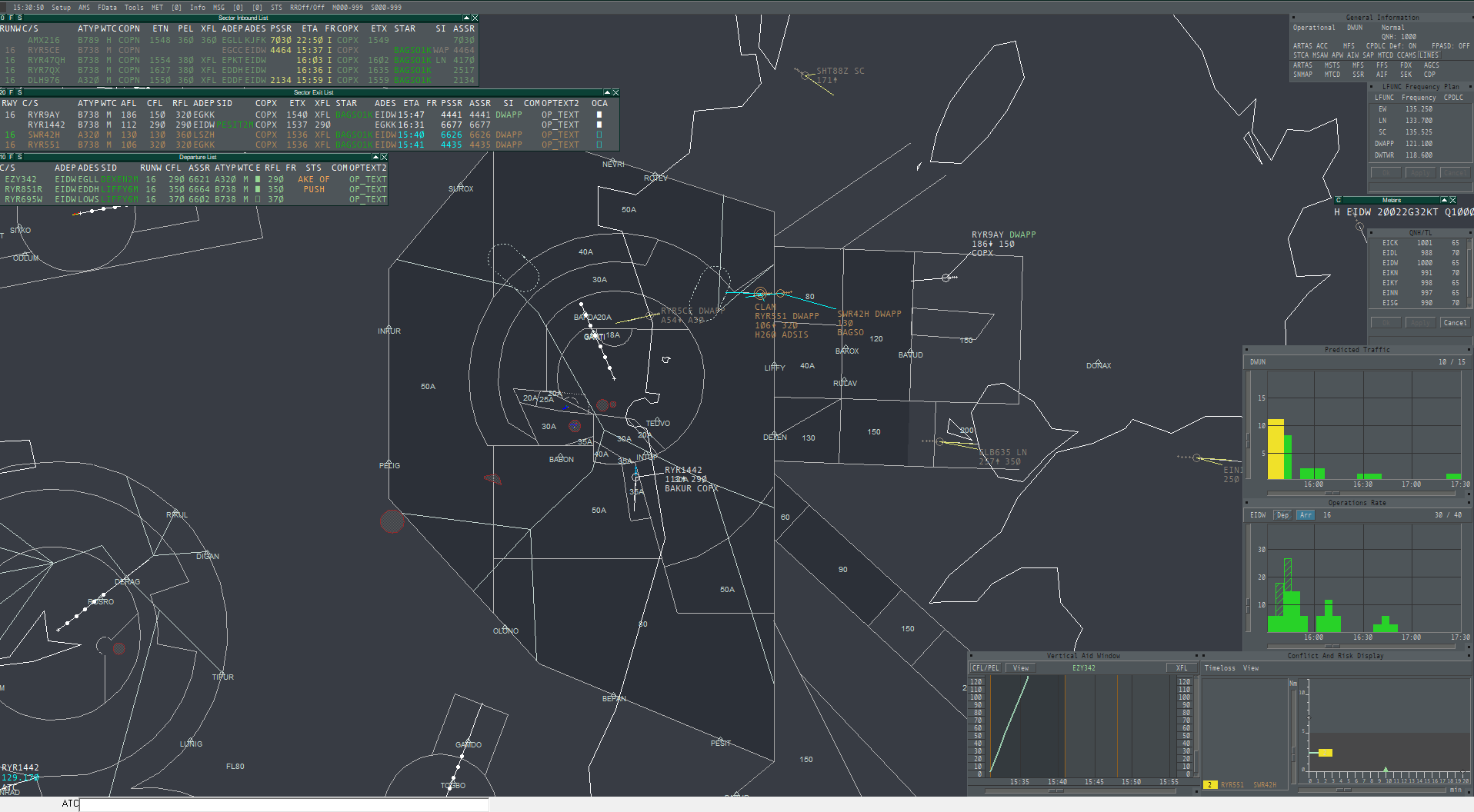
A screenshot of the EuroScope software utilizing the TopSky plugin used by most air traffic controllers on VATSIM (not vatSys)

On January 14, 2012, the vSTARS ATC client was approved for use on the VATSIM network. Also created by Ross Carlson, the client aims to replicate the real-world STARS system used in many US TRACON facilities.

On February 27, 2016, the vERAM ATC client was approved for use on the VATSIM network. Also created by Ross Carlson, the client aims to replicate the real-world ERAM system used in many US ARTCC facilities.

On July 18, 2020, the vatSys ATC client was approved for use on the VATSIM network. Created by Jake Saw, the client aimed to replicate the real-word TAAATS system used in Australia, but is now modelled off the Eurocat/TopSky systems. It features an advanced profiling system which "means that the look and feel of the client can be adjusted with a simple few clicks".

As of October 9, 2023, VRC, vSTARS, and vERAM are deprecated and replaced by the Virtual National Airspace System (vNAS) suite of products. This software is being actively developed and utilized by all ARTCCs in VATUSA. CRC includes has several display types (STARS, ERAM, ASDE-X and Tower Cab) included within a single client.

Pilot clients

VATSIM has 3 approved pilot clients as of February 2026.

Swift pilot client is a multi-platform (Windows, macOS, Linux) and multi-flight simulator (X-Plane 11, MSFS, MSFS2024, P3D, FSX, FS9, FlightGear), this pilot client is not as popular among pilots anymore due to its old GUI, nevertheless it is still being actively developed.

vPilot created by Ross Carlson is still being actively developed and used by majority of MSFS, MSFS2024, P3D and FSX users.

xPilot developed by Justin Shannon is a pilot client for X-Plane, as of August 2020 this project was moved to be an open-source to help with development

=== Audio for VATSIM ===
From its inception, VATSIM employed a system consisting of voice 'rooms', in which, by using custom-written TeamSpeak 2 servers as a backbone, each virtual 'frequency' functioned similarly to a VoIP conference call, and any pilot(s) can transmit on a frequency and talk to each other on any frequency, but it is prohibited to use the frequencies for any non-operational reasons.

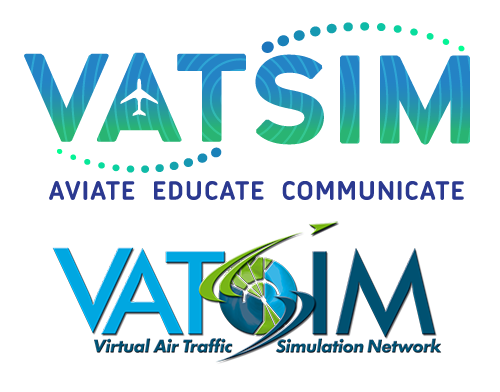
The new VATSIM logo as of July 23, 2020 (top) compared to the previous logo (bottom)

In October 2019, VATSIM had finished a complete overhaul of its voice system and called it Audio for VATSIM, a key feature of which is simulation of the entire VHF radio range, thus eliminating the need for voice rooms. The system realistically simulates signal degradation, audio quality, transceiver operation, frequency cross-coupling, and altitude effects.

On the 19th of June 2026, VATSIM AFV was further enhanced to including terrain-based simulation and real-world radio propagation calculations

=== Microsoft partnership ===
On July 23, 2020, VATSIM, alongside announcing a complete overhaul of their branding, announced that they had entered into a partnership with Microsoft, to ensure that the desktop PC version of Microsoft Flight Simulator would be compatible with VATSIM upon launch. However, due to technical limitations with Xbox, VATSIM does not currently support the Xbox version of Microsoft Flight Simulator. VATSIM did not have launch compatibility for Microsoft Flight Simulator 2024. vPilot was updated and released on 1 November 2024.

=== VATSIM Velocity ===
On March 13, 2021, VATSIM announced a closed-beta initiative to test low latency position updates on the network, named VATSIM Velocity. With this update, position updates increased from 0.2 Hz (5 seconds) to 5 Hz (0.2 seconds) within a 10-mile range.

The SquawkBox and FSInn pilot clients were retired for use on the network on April 1, 2021, due to them not being in active development, which made them incompatible with the fast position updates that were brought with VATSIM Velocity.

VATSIM announced that the long-awaited update would be released on January 31, 2022, at 22:00 UTC. Preparations for its launch included major updates to pilot clients, as well as the retirement of Squawkbox, which became incompatible with the network. However, Velocity had no effect on the functionality of controller clients.

=== VATSIM Inc. ===
On January 16, 2023, VATSIM announced the creation of a new 501(c)(3) non-profit organization, VATSIM Inc. and said it would start accepting donations. VATSIM also stated that it would be transferring ownership to a new board of directors.

== Reception ==
Considered the largest online flight simulation network in the world, VATSIM has attracted mainstream media attention. Commentators have praised VATSIM for its realism and quality, describing the network as giving flight simulation an interest and depth it would otherwise lack and lauding its friendly atmosphere.

Coverage, although mostly positive, has focused on what is perceived to be the peculiar nature of a hobby so complex that it can closely approximate work and cost thousands of dollars. The experience has been described as more strict, for both air traffic controllers and pilots, than some participants might like.

== Membership and training ==
VATSIM has over 191,316 active members as of Q1 2025. Of which 176,385 (92%) hold a pilot/observer rating, and 14,907 (8%) hold an ATC, supervisor or administrator rating. Joining is free, and there are no usage fees associated with connecting to the network. On 10 December 2025, VATSIM announced that the minimum age requirement for new members would increase from 13 to 16, effective 1 January 2026. The announcement included a grandfather clause allowing existing members aged 13–15 to remain unaffected.

Pilots must successfully complete a new member orientation course, including a simple exam that helps reinforce the knowledge of basic piloting skills and the rules of the network as of January 22, 2025. They may also undertake optional training to learn how to fly certain procedures on the network. Pilots may also transfer their real world license into a VATSIM rating as many real world pilots fly on the VATSIM network.

The current pilot ratings are:

- P0 - Basic VATSIM user (awarded after completion of the New User Orientation Program since September 1, 2020)
- P1 - Private pilot license (PPL)
- P2 - Instrument rating (IR)
- P3 - Commercial multi-engine licence (CMEL)
- P4 - Airline transport license (ATPL)

Pilots are able to file their own flight plans either through their flight plan dialog in their pilot client or "pre-filing" by using the myVATSIM ICAO flight planning form, also used by flight planning sites and flight tracking tools such as SimBrief, SimToolkitPro, and Volanta. Air traffic controllers are required to undertake mandatory training before they are permitted to direct traffic. Global Controller Administration Policy defines the requirements for each ATC rating, preceding local division restrictions. The ratings are as follows:

- S1 - Developing controller - validated to control delivery (DEL) and ground (GND) facilities.
- S2 - Aerodrome controller - validated to control Tower (TWR) facilities.
- S3 - Terminal controller - validated to control all facilities up to approach (APP/DEP) level.
- C1 - Enroute controller - validated to control all available facilities, including center (CTR)
- C3 - Senior controller - a special rating awarded to users at the discretion of their local region/division for seniority/recognition. Functionally identical to C1.
- I1 - Instructor - validated to train and instruct virtual air traffic controllers within their division/subdivision, they have the ability to control the same positions as an enroute controller
- I3 - Senior instructor - a special rating awarded to instructors at the discretion of their local region/division for seniority/recognition.

During the 2002 Operation OpenSky event, total online members reached 798 concurrent connections. The "dots" in the screenshot represent aircraft with their routes shown as lines.

== Events ==
The network creates and sponsors regular events to encourage interaction between pilots and controllers, during which traffic can approximate real-life levels.

=== Worldflight ===
Worldflight Australia is an annual virtual round-the-world charity event that has been run continuously since 2001, where 11 teams from different countries in their own fixed-base aircraft simulators fly to over 40 destinations around the world on VATSIM to raise money for the Australian Royal Flying Doctor Service. VATSIM air traffic controllers provide service throughout this event. In 2006, fifteen enthusiasts conducted a 130-hour flight in a full-sized Boeing 747-400 simulator, for which Qantas provided food.

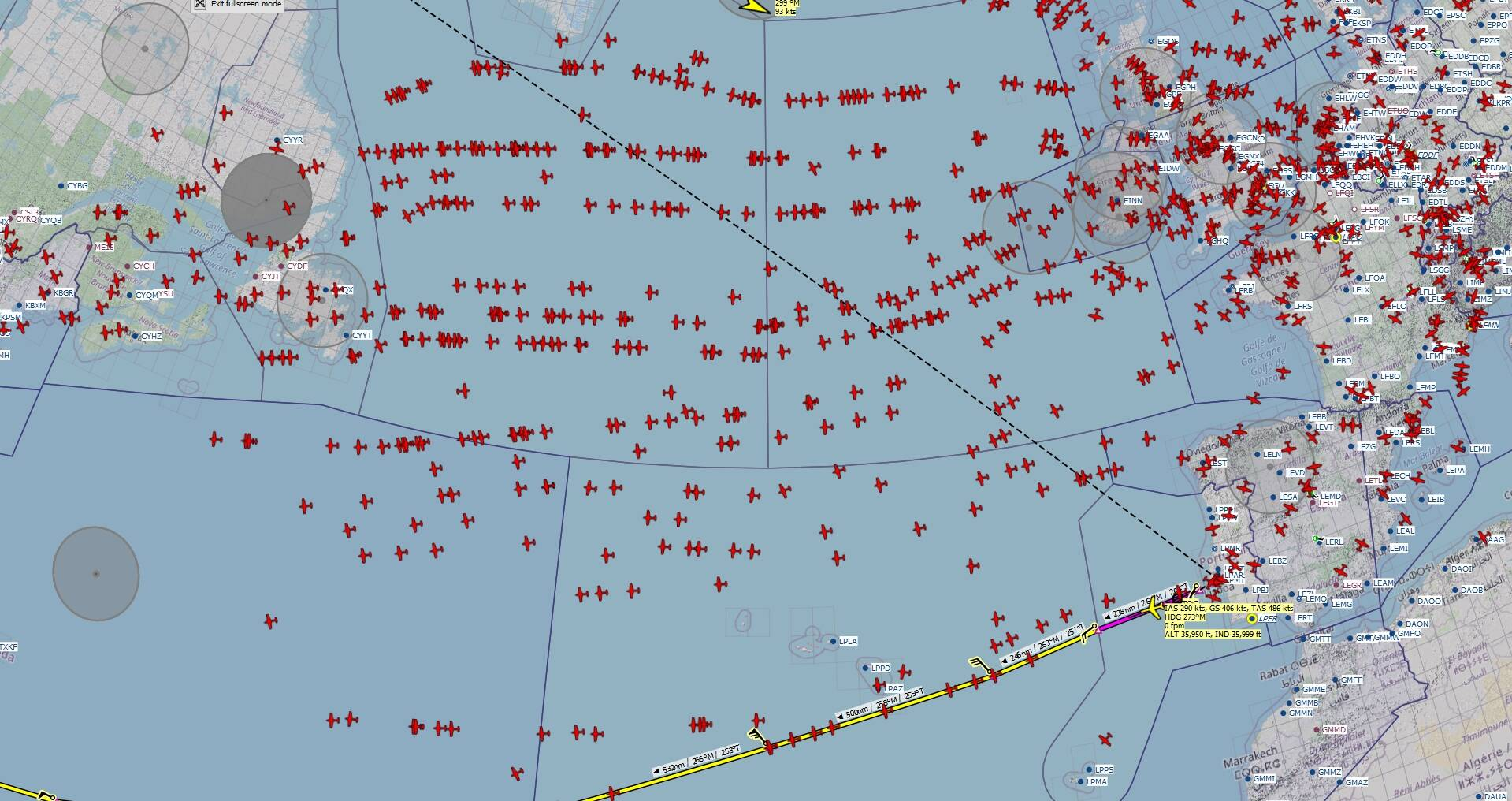
The 2024 Cross the Pond event, showing a map of traffic heading west.

=== Cross the Pond ===
Cross the Pond is a biannual event during which pilots complete transatlantic flights across "The Pond" between Europe and Northern America. The event alternates between westbound and eastbound every 6 months. Certain airports are selected a few months prior for which pilots can book slots to fly for, and VATSIM air traffic controllers provide full service for each of these airports throughout the event. The event is meticulously planned and coordinated by all major VATSIM staff members, to make sure that pilots enjoy their service. During the Autumn 2024 event, VATSIM surpassed its record of most unique connections to the network with 3,208, also making it the biggest online flight simulation network to date. The record was once again broken during the subsequent Spring 2025 event, with 3238 unique connections to the network.

=== VATSIM-organised events ===
VATSIM organises several recurring events that provide immersive and challenging experiences for pilots and air traffic controllers.

VATSIM First Wings is held once a month. To allow everyone to participate, regardless of their timezone, the location of the event rotates every month, passing through all corners of the world. The event is intended for new users to gain confidence and experience.

Similarly to First Wings, VATSIM Elite Wings is an event scheduled on a regular basis which features more complex scenarios for experienced users.

The 24 Hours of VATSIM is a large-scale global event held twice a year which features 24 hours of uninterrupted ATC coverage across several flight legs.

=== Regional events ===
In addition to the global/international events that VATSIM sponsors and advertises, regional events can be found daily throughout the network. These events can range from small in size, including only a few airports or facilities, to very large in size, spanning across multiple regions and facilities. Although they don't typically attract record-breaking traffic, these events have been known to draw enough pilots to simulate, (and often surpass) real-world operations at the selected facilities.

== See also ==
- Virtual airline
- Flight simulator
- Massively multiplayer online game
- Air traffic control
- International Virtual Aviation Organisation
- FlightSimCon
