= Avsim.com =

Flight simulator dedicated social media

AVSIM Online
- Website type: Aviation Website
- Owner: AVSIM Online
- Creator: Tom Allensworth
- Website: www.avsim.com
- Commercial: Yes
- Registration: Free
- Launched: 1996; 30 years ago
- Current status: Online

AVSIM is a nonprofit flight simulation social networking service that focuses on Microsoft Flight Simulator, Prepar3D, and X-Plane. It features a community forum, file library, and product reviews. The website is maintained by a group of volunteers. Bandwidth and equipment are paid for by donations and advertising. It is one of the world's largest flight simulation websites and provides users access to information and add-ons for the flight simulator series of games. On May 12, 2009, the website was attacked by a hacker which resulted in a catastrophic loss of data. AVSIM was able to fully recover from the hack with the help of IT support from around the world.

== History ==
The publisher of AVSIM, Tom Allensworth, operated a Bulletin Board System from 1983 until approximately the fall of 1995. Initially named CAPENET because it was located in Cape Cod (a peninsula of Massachusetts) during the early 1980s, it was renamed The Vine (The Virginia Information and Network Exchange) when moved to central Virginia in 1987. These early forays into BBS systems, combined with an early exposure to aviation through flight lessons in the early 1970s, as well as Bruce Artwick's Flight Simulator 1.0, brought about the concept of developing an aviation-themed website in the closing months of 1996.

The initial concept for AVSIM was the provision of articles and capture images of the flight simulation genre, collated into HTML format as a monthly magazine and packaged into a zip file. This was then made available for download among the major library servers on the Internet, including the file library system run and maintained at the Indiana University of Pennsylvania, which was becoming one of the first major file libraries for flight simulation. The first issue was uploaded to the university and elsewhere on 1 March 1997. With the growth of the flight simulation community, the magazine moved into a continuously updated website in April 1997. The site began listing news items from the flight simulation industry in 1999, and has been doing so ever since.

=== Reception ===
The website is popular within the video game genre of flight simulation. Commentators within the flight simulation and aviation community identify the site as a key website within the genre, along with the similar website Flightsim.com. The Alexa traffic website lists Avsim.com as the highest rating flight simulation website on its network, which Avsim.com claim makes them the most visited flight simulation website on the internet.

== Hacking case ==
On May 12, 2009, AVSIM was attacked by a hacker, resulting in a catastrophic loss of data from the website. Tom Allensworth, CEO and Publisher of AVSIM, explained that the site used two servers to back-up the site's data, but that the hacker deleted the content of both, destroying the ability to use one server to restore the data of the other. The site had not established an external backup system. After AVSIM went offline, Allensworth issued the following announcement:

“We regret to inform the flight simulation community that on Tuesday, May 12, AVSIM was hacked and effectively destroyed. The method of the hack makes recovery difficult, if not impossible, to recover from. Both servers, that was the library/email and website/forum servers were attacked. AVSIM is totally offline at this time and we expect to be so for some time to come. We are not able to predict when we will be back online, if we can come back at all. We will post more news as we are able to in the coming days and weeks….”

Nevertheless, the recovery process went quicker than most expected. Sections of the site began restoration on May 26, and as of May 28, most of the site had been recovered to its original form, but the file library and some links were still being repaired. The cost of the recovery of the site was about $25,000 (USD) to pay for new servers and experts to recover the files. Most of that cost had been funded through Avsim's donation system and advertisers. Limited service was restored after Memorial Day, 2009 and full service was tentatively scheduled for reactivation in the first week of June, 2009 following file investigation, debugging, and recompilation.

A gradual recovery of the site took place over several days. The servers were replaced, the email addresses and forums were recovered on May 26, and the front page and other elements of the site on May 28. On the 28th it was also announced on the front page that approximately 90% of the file library would be recoverable, and that all Flight Simulator X and Flight Simulator 9 files were intact. The library was brought back online, with more than 95% of the original content, as of July 26.

On September 7 AVSIM filed a civil suit in Britain against the person who hacked the organization in May. The AVSIM website issued the following statement:

“Today, September 7th, 2009, AVSIM filed a criminal complaint with the Police Constabulary of London. We will not name any names, but have incontrovertible evidence of the individual that performed the hack of AVSIM on May 12th this year. We have protected the forensic evidence and provided that evidence to the London police. We are committed to bringing justice to bear on this case...

[T]hough we tried to resolve this over the last three months out of court, giving this person two opportunities to settle with us, the individual did not avail himself of the opportunity - in fact, he has ignored our proffers. We are now doing as we promised this person we would do; ratcheting this up to the next, criminal, level. To the extent that prudence allow, we will keep you informed of future developments.”

As of July 2011 AVSIM had still not updated its users on the situation and it appeared that the matter had been brushed under the carpet given the last few words of the above quote; then, in a retrospective blog post in June 2012, Tom Allensworth, the founder of AVSIM, explained that legal action was ultimately dropped.

== AVSIM conference and exhibition ==
The website runs a regular conference and exhibition since 1999, most recently titled FANCON, focusing on aviation simulation to showcase flight simulation technology, software, and hardware. This conference has been supported by leading manufacturers and developers in the industry, including Microsoft. Previous conferences have been held each year at a different location from 2002 through to 2007, with the 2007 event held in Bellevue, Washington, from November 9 to 11. The event featured sponsorship from a number of major industry organizations, such as NaturalPoint. The website decided not to have a 2008 convention due to the decaying economy and an anticipated reluctance to travel but has announced a social meeting to take place instead.

In 2009, AVSIM planned to hold the convention in Dayton, Ohio, from September 4 until September 6, at the Wright-Patterson Air Force Base.

== Services ==
The main focus of the website is providing additional content that users can use within a Flight Simulator, such as aircraft in addition to default planes, scenery, modified airport files, additional AI (artificial intelligence) aircraft (Simulator-controlled air traffic), and programs which modify all of the above. Additionally, the website provides users with reviews of commercial content created for use with a flight simulator, such as Microsoft Flight Simulator, X-Plane, and Prepar3D. Full commercial reviews are covered as news items listed on the website's main page. The website's forums are used as a focal point for discussion of reviews, news within the industry, as well as general industry topics.

The website has been run completely by volunteers since its opening in 1996. Since the founder's passing, all affairs have been managed by a volunteer Board of Directors consisting of Jim Young, Chuck Jodry, and Chase Kreznor. The website is monitored and maintained by over 30 volunteers.

=== Downloadable content ===
Screenshot of Avsim.com homepage in November 2008

The website manages files of various content including:

- Aircraft
- Panels
- Gauges
- Scenery
- Repaints/Replacement Textures
- Missions
- Sounds
- Utilities
- Flight Manuals
- Flight simulator guides
