= Flightsim.com =

Video game website dedicated to flight simulators

FlightSim.Com
- Website type: Gaming
- Owner: FlightSim.Com Inc.
- Creator: Nelson Anderson
- Website: http://www.flightsim.com/
- Commercial: Yes
- Registration: Free, First Class
- Launched: 1996
- Current status: Under Reconstruction since 1st January 2026

FlightSim.Com is a flight simulation review and resource website that focuses heavily on Microsoft Flight Simulator. It is one of the main flight simulation websites along with Avsim.com and provides users access to information and addons for the flight simulator series of video games.

== History ==
The website sources its origins to Bulletin Board System discussion groups for flight simulation dating back as far as 1985 and was one of the earliest flight simulator sites on the internet. The existing library of files dates back prior to the website in its current format, with some existing files originating from when the website was run on the BBS provider Xevious BBS, which was established by the FlightSim.Com creator Nels Anderson in 1983 and still runs as part of the site today.

The website partnered with UGO Networks in 1999 with the aim of providing all content free of charge, and gaining its revenue through an advertising model. Throughout the early 1990s and into the new millennium, the website gained increasing popularity on the back of increasing interest and sales of the Microsoft Flight Simulator series of products. As of 2006 the website no longer appeared to be partnered with UGO Networks and gets revenue from its own sale of banner advertisement space in addition to membership subscriptions.

As of 1st January 2026, the site was closed "temporarily for reconstruction", however, as of October 2026, still has not reappeared, with no updates on if (or when) it will return.

== Popularity ==
The website is popular within the video game genre of flight simulation. Commentators within the flight simulation and aviation community consistently rate the website as a "must visit" among fans of the genre, along with the similar website Avsim.com. The website has also received coverage in a number of publications over the years when the media require comment on issues relating to flight simulation. While the website has continued to gain popularity the basic format and provision of services has changed little since it became commercially oriented in 1996. The website is commonly referenced in literature as a source for downloading aircraft files for use with Microsoft Flight Simulator further increasing the websites popularity among the community.

Screenshot of FlightSim.Com homepage in November 2008

== Services ==
The main focus of the website is providing additional content that users can use within a Flight Simulator. Additionally the website provides users with reviews of commercial content created for use with a flight simulator such as Microsoft Flight Simulator. Full commercial reviews are covered as special features listed on the websites main page. Guides on how to operate the simulator and other aspects of flight simulation are collected in articles, information, and how-to sections of the website aiming to provide resources to those interested in flight simulation.

=== Downloadable Content ===
The following additional content is commonly indexed by the website and available for download:

- Aircraft
- Scenery
- Utilities
- Sounds
- Missions

Much of this content is created by freeware developers and offered to the community without charge. Occasionally, payware commercial developers will release products free on the site to generate interest in their other products. A section of the website provides background and information on development of additional content for flight simulators, including a list of prominent developers and members of the community. The website also offers a developers award and excellence program aiming to highlight both commercial and non-commercial successes within the boutique industry of flight simulation content development.

=== Community ===
Along with community websites such as Avsim.com, the website has been identified as a key component in bringing community members together to discuss the topic of flight simulation, with real world meetings and events of website community members common. The website also provides a news service that covers both commercial releases and important announcements from developers and virtual airlines within the community. Community forums are provided for both the website community and the flight simulation community in general, with many of the early virtual airlines having forums and websites hosted by the site. Both X-Plane and Microsoft Flight Simulator forums are featured on the website. Another site, Train-sim.com, is also owned by Flightsim.com and similarly serves the train simulator community.

== Subscription ==
Users must subscribe to the website to access file downloads. While the base level subscription is free and provides access to all areas, there is some limitation on download speed. First-class memberships are offered that feature unrestricted downloading and higher speeds.

== See also ==
- Avsim.com
- Flight Simulation
- Lockheed Martin Prepar3D
- Microsoft Flight Simulator
- X-Plane
- Virtual airline (hobby)
