= Virtual military =

A Virtual Military Organization (VMO) is a dedicated hobby organization that uses simulation to model the operations of a military. Virtual Military Organizations (VMOs) generally have a presence on the internet, similar to real military organizations. Most VMOs simulate military operations to varying degrees. A newer variant of Virtual Military is the MilSim unit. MilSim units differ from Virtual Military by placing emphasis on the simulation of military tactics in their chosen gaming platform, whereas traditionally, VMOs have placed emphasis on simulating the bigger picture, including a full military career path, logistics systems, coordinated movement of equipment around the world, and prolonged military operations. Although VMOs may appear to be a type of gaming clan, a key difference is that a gaming clan's primary purpose is to be an "organized group of players that regularly play together." VMOs are essentially role-playing environments within which an individual can immerse themselves. Realism groups are semantically similar; however, their primary focus is usually on following real-life procedures as much as possible. Therefore, tactical realism and MilSim are almost synonymous in the gaming world. A Google search for 'Virtual Military' reveals quite a few VMOs that go to varying degrees of depth to pursue their goal.

Each VMO has their own mission. Some VMOs will simulate an individual military unit, others an entire branch of the military, and yet others attempt to simulate Joint Operations with multiple branches. Most VMOs offer a rank system that provides a career path within the organization. VMOs will often offer a variety of training, in order to allow new members to familiarize themselves with the organization's doctrine.

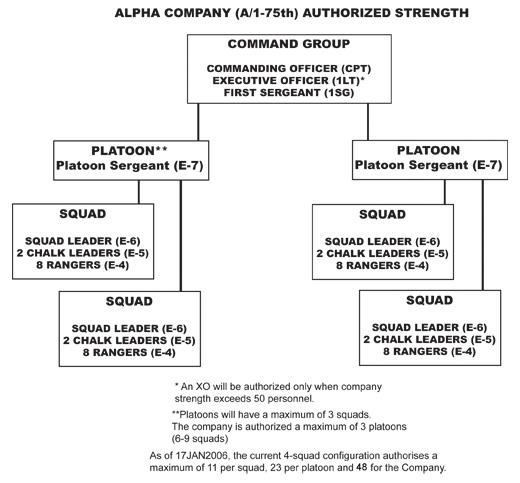
A standard organization of a MILSIM/VMO

== Realism vs immersion ==
Each VMO chooses to either follow an immersive style, a realistic style, or a combination of both. Immersion as it relates to this topic is the pursuit of a feeling of complete saturation in a military operation, whereas realism is the rigid following of real-world rules, tactics, and customs of a real-life counterpart. For some people, realism is in fact immersive, so there is an element of crossover between the two terms. While most VMOs will incorporate a rank structure, some extend that to incorporate features such as Military Logistics systems, economics models, awards and medals, and custom debriefing reports.

While each has its benefits and followers, a mix between the two seems to be the most popular option.

Some VMOs can be creative by making their own custom paint schemes, medals and award ribbons, rank insignia, weapons, vehicles, aircraft, and bases (Air bases mostly developed for Flight Simulator X).

Some groups form a historical, political, economic, or persistent battle image or reputation over time. They support various causes and styles of law and order, or internal hierarchy structures. Some groups might form specific government types, ranging from Communism to Fascism, Democracy to Monarchy, and so on. At times, there are even Anarchist rebel groups, or militias that form. Groups might grow to form into completely custom government entities or structures, and on into resembling small nations, with their own flags and codes of honor.

== Games ==
As of 2017, popular games used by the VMO community include Arma 3, Darkest Hour: Europe '44-'45, and Squad for land-based simulation, and Microsoft Flight Simulator, Falcon BMS, and Digital Combat Simulator for aviation simulation. A few units play games such as Call of Duty or Battlefield, but mostly those are casual clans, although some attempt to play tactically. On another note, notable instances of virtual militaries within games have made it as far as the popular children's platform ROBLOX, showing the extent of this genre.

== The Future of Virtual Military Simulation ==
It has been reported that Virtual Military groups which originated within the flight simulation genre are once thought to not be as active as previously.

As with all types of organizations, the VMO community has seen splits, merges, and closures over time. At the same time, fresh blood has been injected with new VMOs opening. This constant activity promotes knowledge transfer between groups, and subsequently most VMOs have now standardized their business model to the point there are very few differences between each of them. Very few have unique characteristics. New groups often appear to start out using the business model of the successful VMOs.

Some of the more unique characteristics of VMOs include:

- A Military Logistics model, where missions cannot be conducted without supplies being brought in first. Then during mission, supplies are finite.
- A geopolitical model, where the diplomatic and military situation are both simulated and affect one another.
- A Persistent world model, where the mission state is maintained using persistence.
- A Joint Warfare model, where multiple units within a group, or multiple groups working together use a combined arms doctrine to achieve full-spectrum dominance.
- An intelligence model, where the mission is planned using strategic and operational intelligence, and mission commanders are advised by tactical intelligence. This model may include internal and external intelligence gathering, whereby agents seek to infiltrate elements of their own or other groups.
- A peacekeeping model, whereby the group's missions are primarily based around creating conditions that favor lasting peace. This may include humanitarian assistance, disaster relief, as well as post or pre-conflict monitoring and observation.

Successful groups include more than one of the above characteristics into their missions. This creates a rich environment that deepens the immersion for players. According to BJ Fogg's behavior model, motivation is closely linked to actions and triggers. In order to successfully create a lasting future for VMOs, it is therefore paramount that groups include triggers and actions that enhance the player's motivation. Since a VMO is essentially an abstraction of a game, group leaders should also consider learning about gamification in order to create a lasting bond between the player and the group.

== See also ==
- Military simulation
- Virtual airline (hobby)
- Virtual battlefield
