= Clan (video games) =

Organized group of video game players

In video games, a clan, community, guild, or faction is an organized group of video game players that regularly play together in one or more multiplayer games. Some clans take part in gaming competitions, while many are small gaming squads consisting of friends.

Squads range from groups of a few friends to four-thousand plus person organizations, with a broad range of structures, goals and members. The lifespan of a clan also varies considerably, from a few weeks to over a decade. Numerous clans exist for nearly every online game available today, notably in first-person shooters (FPS), massively multiplayer games (MMO), role-playing video games (RPG), and strategy games. There are also meta-groups that span a wide variety of games. Some clans formed by groups of players have grown into multi-million dollar professional esports teams.

Many clans on Xbox One, PlayStation 4, and personal computers have official clan websites with forums to interact and discuss many topics with the rest of their clan. They offer in-clan awards and medals for clan achievements ranging from time in the clan to wins and contributions to the group like donations and prizes for giveaways. The terms alliance and team are also used for this purpose in, e.g., Illyriad or Freeciv.

== In first-person shooters ==
As the first-person shooter (FPS) genre became increasingly popular, the idea of a competitive clan became widely accepted. Clans became teams, or elite clan members form teams to represent the clan in online battle. FPS clans normally host servers with rules that they like. For instance if a group of gamers like to use pistols only they could join a clan that runs a pistols only server and the clan would enforce the rules.

== In role-playing games ==
Clans also exist in other genres, where they are often referred to by a different name and serve a purpose more suited to the game. Many massively multiplayer online (MMO) and role-playing video games (RPGs) tend to call them "guilds" or invent their own term. Examples of this include Star Wars Galaxies ("player associations") and EVE Online ("corporations"). EVE Online is also notable for having defined the system in more detail than is common in most MMOs, with "alliances" being structured collections of corporations such that a corporation may have a dedicated role within the alliance to which it belongs. The final form of community in EVE Online is known as a Coalition, which is a grouping of multiple alliances. This third-tier arrangement isn't supported by the game software as such; instead, coalitions are purely player driven creations. In the superhero-based game City of Heroes, they are called "supergroups", and are similar in structure to comic book hero organizations like the X-Men. In Final Fantasy XI, such clans are called "linkshells" and players of the game have the tendency and ability to be in more than one at once. Final Fantasy XIV also shares the same system for Linkshells as Final Fantasy XI but also with the addition of "Free Companies" which allow for the more traditional form of Clan and Guild system seen in most MMORPG games.

== In simulation games ==
Many simulation games, such as those in the Microsoft Flight Simulator series, have clans that follow similar patterns to other genres. Notable types of simulation clans include virtual airlines (VAs) and Virtual Military Organizations (VMOs). A virtual airline is a dedicated hobby organization that uses flight simulation to model the operations of an airline. VAs generally have a presence on the Internet, similar to a real airline. The Pilot Career Guide, published in 1999, estimated that there were over 100 Professional Pilot Career Guide VAs of significance, with tens of thousands of participants at any one time.

== History ==
Previously, a guild hosting or clan hosting service was used for video games. It is a specialized type of web hosting service designed to support online gaming communities, generally referred to as guilds or clans. Originally, most people who decided to create a website for their guild used bulletin board software such as vBulletin and phpBB on traditional web hosting services. However, as the complexity of online games increased, many guilds sought after more advanced management features and turned to specialized services to accommodate their needs.

One of the earliest such companies was GuildPortal, formed in 2001. In 2006, competition increased with the launch of 3 new services: GuildCafe (now GamerDNA), GuildLaunch (now Gamer Launch) and MMO Guildsites (now Shivtr). In 2008, two new providers joined the guild hosting scene, iClan Websites and Ejeet Networks. Ejeet Networks took a massive amount of stakes directly to the guild hosting world and made a press release to Tech2 Gaming which was then published in the Mumbai Times and placed in a top social media spotlight to this day they offer to the minute technology for guilds. With guilds increasingly playing more than one game, Enjin launched a new CMS in 2009 with the ability of creating multiple gaming divisions on one website. The number of guild hosting services continues to grow with the rising popularity of Massively Multiplayer Online Roleplaying Games.

Even though guilds initially may have been informal and unplanned, there has been a change where game developers made guilds part of game environments and incorporated mechanisms supporting guilds into their structures.
