= Microsoft Flight Simulator (2020 video game) =

Flight simulation video game

- Cover art, featuring an Airbus A320neo (top), Cessna Citation CJ4 (right), and Zlin Savage Cub Classic (left)
- Developer: Asobo Studio
- Publisher: Xbox Game Studios
- Directors: Jörg Neumann (Note: Under Xbox Game Studios); David Dedeine
- Designer: Damien Cuzacq
- Programmer: Alain Guyet
- Artist: Patrice Bourroncle
- Composer: Finishing Move Inc.
- Series: Microsoft Flight Simulator
- Platforms: Windows; Xbox Series X/S
- Release: Windows; August 18, 2020; Xbox Series X/S; July 27, 2021
- Genre: Flight simulation
- Modes: Single-player, multiplayer

Microsoft Flight Simulator is a 2020 flight simulation video game developed by Asobo Studio and published by Xbox Game Studios. It is a sequel to Microsoft Flight Simulator X (2006) and a reboot of the Microsoft Flight Simulator series, which began in 1982. The game's development began six years prior to its release. It was released on August 18, 2020 for Windows, with a virtual reality (VR) version released in December of the same year as part of a free update. Microsoft Flight Simulator is the first installment in the series to see a VR and console release, being released on the Xbox Series X and Series S on July 27, 2021.

Flight Simulator simulates the topography of the Earth using data from Bing Maps. Microsoft Azure's artificial intelligence (AI) generates the three-dimensional representations of Earth's features, using its cloud computing to render and enhance visuals, and real-world data to generate real-time weather and effects. Flight Simulator features a physics engine to provide realistic flight control surfaces, with over 1,000 simulated surfaces, as well as realistic wind modeled over hills and mountains. Some places are handcrafted, introduced in region-specific updates. To augment its realism, Azure incorporates real-time elements like natural weather and real-world air traffic.

Flight Simulator was released to critical acclaim, with universal praise for its visuals and realism, and it was cited by critics as the "safest way to travel" during the COVID-19 pandemic. Several reviewers placed it on their favorites' lists and called it the most aesthetically pleasing game of 2020, though there was some criticism of its slow loading times, inaccuracies in rendering certain buildings, and unrealistic aerodynamics models. It has been considered one of the greatest video games and it received several accolades, most notably winning "Best Sim/Strategy Game" at The Game Awards 2020, and "Strategy/Simulation Game of the Year" at the 24th Annual D.I.C.E. Awards. A sequel, Microsoft Flight Simulator 2024, was released in November 2024.

== Gameplay ==
An A320neo is cleared for takeoff at Budapest's runway 31L. The "Assistance" waypoints, in blue, are seen guiding the player, and the new subtitles feature is seen below. Above, an arrow can be seen; this signifies the centre, which is vital to implement a perfect take-off and landing. The cockpit ambience dominates the image.

As a flight simulation video game, Microsoft Flight Simulator has a tutorial segment divided into sequences that allow players who are new either to aviation or flight simulators, to learn the game's basic controls, flight instruments, and other topics deemed essential for them to know before flying; it concludes with a takeoff and landing test. Throughout the tutorial, fictional pilot Captain Jess Molina, voiced by Marie Westbrook, assists players. It offers landing challenges at some of the most famous and dangerous airports and the player is graded based on "how close to the center of the runway you land, how long it takes your plane to come to a full stop, and the touchdown's smoothness." Another gameplay mode features three sight-seeing bush trips set in Nevada, Patagonia and the Balkans.

Flight Simulator has an artificial intelligence (AI) air traffic controller (ATC) and a virtual co-pilot who can assist players when they are unable to perform actions like requesting landing clearance or going through checklists. It has several helper features: "Assistance" enables waypoint arrows at the taxiways, showing players where to go; "Route & Waypoints" enables markers to guide players in the sky; "Landing Path" guides players on landing; "Travel To" allows the pilot to jump to certain points of the flight (climb, cruise, descent, approach, finals – similar to time-lapse), condensing long-haul flights; an "Active Pause" pauses the flight, allowing players to explore the surrounding area or take a break. There are subtitles available for radio transmissions. These features are not available during challenges. The game also features a "legacy" option to enable a flight model from previous iterations of Flight Simulator.

Flight Simulator allows players to search for fauna, either by filtering for it on the world map or selecting "Fauna Markers" when in mid-air. The "Autorudder" feature keeps the plane on the centre line of taxiways and runways when the player cannot control it. Another feature allows the player to enter a geographic coordinate to find a location. The gameplay screen features a toolbar of buttons which allow the player to open the various windows for air traffic control, the camera views, modify checklists, view the navigation log, see objectives, view the visual flight rules (VFR) map, etc. The gaming interface also has the VHF omnidirectional range (VOR) compass, and the altimeter, throttle, engine, fuel, flaps, and trim tabs controls. Additional features like the head-up display (HUD) are accessible from the settings.

Flight Simulator features no animations or depictions of damage or collision when an aircraft crashes. Instead, it cuts to black and provides a one-line message explaining why the plane crashed. Damaging the plane without crashing can degrade the aircraft's flight characteristics and so cause the aircraft structure to fail, which will place a message saying the aircraft exceeded limits but not exactly which limits were exceeded.

Due to its complex amount of topographical, scenery and object data, Flight Simulator requires a certain speed of Internet connection for seamless gameplay. Windows Central states that a minimum of 5 Mbit/s is required, with at least 20 Mbit/s recommended and 50 Mbit/s being ideal. Flight Simulator has an offline mode, which uses the latest pre-cached data saved to the local hard drive. Two caches exist, a rolling cache (controlled automatically by the simulator) and a manual cache (which can be set by the user). The rolling cache is written to when the user goes to flight mode, caching the local objects and scenery, and updates as the pilot flies around the virtual world. The user sets the manual cache locations and amount of detail to be stored, and the user can determine the storage sizes used in both methods - as well as turn them off if required.

=== Features ===
The Standard edition of Flight Simulator includes over 20 flyable aircraft; the Deluxe has five more, and the Premium Deluxe edition has ten additional airplanes compared to the basic version. Most of the aircraft are of American, French, or German origin, with a few manufactured by Austrian, Czech, and Slovenian companies. Aircraft included in the Deluxe version include those manufactured by Diamond Aircraft, Cirrus Aircraft, and Textron Aviation Inc., while aircraft exclusive to the Premium Deluxe version includes the Boeing 787-10 Dreamliner and the Cessna Citation Longitude, and several general aviation aircraft. Flight Simulator includes around 37,000 manually edited airports from around the world based on real-world satellite images. The Standard, Deluxe, and Premium Deluxe edition include, respectively, 30, 35, or 40 hand-crafted airports that replicate their real-world counterparts. Airports in the Deluxe edition include those in the United States, Europe, and Africa, while those exclusively for the Premium Deluxe version include Heathrow and Dubai Airports, in addition to those from the US and Europe.

The addition of third-party aircraft and airports, including those from Flight Simulator X are supported within the simulator, as are additions of other services. Virtual Air Traffic Simulation Network (VATSIM) and the International Virtual Aviation Organisation (IVAO) are examples of online flight-simulation networks supported within Flight Simulator since release that allow pilots to talk to human air traffic controllers (instead of the AI ones) and to each other where there is no ATC coverage. These services add to the realism of flight simulators, and VATSIM was even used in 2008 to test proposed real-world changes to ATC before implementation. Many of the third-party add-ons are repaints or exclusive liveries. In addition, there are other add-ons (mods) for things such as recording flights, and a weather mod designed by Weather Preset Pro. The Microsoft team has said that they "welcome [all third party developers] onboard," and that they are "critically important". To simplify things, an in-game marketplace was created on the game's website featuring a variety of third-party content. This includes the stock world updates, and some third-party mods such as A32NX by FlyByWire Simulations for the Airbus A320neo control systems. The team is committed to introducing new paid downloadable content (DLC) every "two or three months".

== Technology ==
Microsoft Flight Simulator uses Microsoft Azure data, and simulates the Earth using textures and data from Bing Maps. In this gameplay screenshot, a Cirrus SR22 is flying over Hong Kong's Victoria Harbour.

Microsoft Flight Simulator uses its in-house graphics and physics engine while using Microsoft Azure to provide over two petabytes of world map data taken from the cloud on demand. Microsoft partnered with Blackshark.ai, who developed a solution that uses Microsoft Azure and AI to analyze map data and photogrammetry to generate photorealistic 3D models of buildings, trees, terrain, and so on. This allows the simulator to depict parts of the world in 3D photorealism, and others in high definition. Flight Simulator generates its terrain and scenery objects initially from satellite imagery or fly-by image scans. Due to distortion from the fly-bys, color correction and shadow removal were essential. An "offline procedural generation AI" uses those and the data from Bing Maps to generate the scenery and objects for the virtual world. This can be enhanced using human intervention to assemble photorealistic objects and scenery for even higher levels of realism.

Flight Simulator features multiple terabytes of texture and height map data. According to Alex Battaglia of Eurogamer, "Using a base mesh and textures, the game utilises your [I]nternet connection to stream even higher quality terrain data onto your PC as you play, via the Azure cloud". This means that as the pilot flies around the world, the game downloads area-specific high quality scenery and objects which he says "boost the game's fidelity and diversity that I've yet to see in any other release". Bing Maps updates every 28 days, allowing the simulator's base imagery to be periodically refreshed. Its real-time data sources include meteorological information and air traffic updates. In rare cases where certain areas are blurred or pixelated on Bing Maps it "uses procedural techniques to fill in the blanks and make sure there is something in the space". Some other places, however, were blurred on purpose using clouds, filled with generic instead of specific graphics.

Developer Asobo Studio scanned the interiors and exteriors of aircraft with a 3D scanner to create their realistic looks, polished with modeling and printing. Textron Aviation helped with the realism of the Cessna and Beechcraft aircraft. There are realistic physics and weather systems, and utilization of real-world weather data. For instance, if it is raining somewhere in real life, it can rain in-game. Individual clouds have their own behaviours and impact aircraft performance depending on its location within the system. Flight Simulator features a 600-kilometre (370 mi) draw distance and allows the player to see storms on the horizon, with lightning cracking inside the clouds. Flight Simulator is the first flight simulator to enable worldwide visual flight rules (VFR), a feature not seen in contemporary flight simulators used by airlines to train and test pilots.

Through cloud-based technology, Flight Simulator sends data to the computer or console in real time, with AI being utilized to extrapolate geometry from a blend of satellite and flyover imagery. Other sources of data include terrain data for landscaping, data for foliage density, real-time meteorological data, and air traffic updates. A separate atmospheric renderer simulates accurate humidity and pollution. Skyscrapers cast shadows over each other that darken as the player reaches street level and cities disperse light at night that radiates the sky. Cloud technology is used to calculate, among other things, the way air flows around natural structures such as mountains to cause pockets of turbulence, or stream in the world's real-time air traffic, and time of day and weather. The game's detailed physics were chained to the aircraft itself: for instance, certain aircraft speeds determine the speed of the water streaming through the aircraft's windows, and certain wind movements determine the shape of turbulence.

Volumetric lighting is used for various effects, including illuminating water droplets, which can cover the entire cockpit window, and with everything being simulated in real time. Light sources such as the sun, moon, or city lights scatter appropriately through the environment, pollution levels and humidity affect refraction and overall visibility, and the atmosphere is layered the same as it is in the real world. Clouds are volumetrically modelled, with 32 layers determining shape, density, and “fuzziness". At times, Flight Simulator's reflection system uses ray marching by retranslating voxels. Otherwise, the reflection system uses a mix of screen-space reflections and cube maps to show reflections on more distant bodies of water. In addition to a complex lighting system, Flight Simulator makes use of highly detailed shaders. The game uses screen-space reflections (an optional feature selected by players) extensively, and bokeh depth of field.

Flight Simulator populates the world with animals and roads with vehicles, grasses have individual blades, and water flows realistically based on wind direction, creating the illusion of a living world. The game world includes over 2 million cities and towns, 1.5 billion buildings, 2 trillion trees, and 37,000 real-world airports. This approach allows Microsoft to flag artifacts and visual anomalies from a bird's-eye view, clearing up the input for a world-building algorithm. The result is fed into Microsoft's artificial intelligence, stringing the environment together in the cloud, and then streamed to the computer (PC) or console in real time. Flight Simulator features various animal species that can even be viewed at ground level, including birds, elephants, giraffes and bears. It allows the player to scout, chase and interact with real-world storms as they occur in real time.

== Development ==
Using data of Microsoft's home city of Seattle, which Bing Maps has rendered down to five-centimeter resolution [...], Asobo took a few weeks to put together a demo of a Cessna flying downtown. Neumann then showed it to Phil Spencer [...].

"He just looked at me and said, 'Why are you showing me a video of [...] a plane?'" Neumann says. "And then the plane turned, and we flew over the Microsoft campus where we were [... right now]. And he's like, 'Is this real time? Is this running?' And I'm like, 'Yes, it is!' And we knew then we had something special."

— Jörg Neumann on presenting an early build of Flight Simulator to Xbox head Phil Spencer

France's Asobo Studio developed Microsoft Flight Simulator published by Xbox Game Studios. The game was announced at E3 2019 on June 9, 2019. It is the first major entry in the Microsoft Flight Simulator series since 2006's Flight Simulator X (FSX), following a long period of uncertainty over the future of the series after the closure of Aces Game Studio in 2009. The game was mainly developed by 120 people.

Six years before its release, Microsoft began working with Asobo on a product called HoloTour for Microsoft's HoloLens mixed reality headset. They built a digital version of Machu Picchu's vast mountainside and vistas versus normal buildings at street level. Microsoft executives and Neumann consulted with the Bing Maps team to use their detailed photogrammetry data of Machu Picchu, which included the ruins, to create a HoloLens replica of it. Neumann later used Bing Maps photogrammetry data for Asobo to build a flight demo for the city of Seattle, The technology incorporates Microsoft's discontinued Photosynth project, which generates 3D models from 2D photos. Wanting to use the technology for a game, project leader Jörg Neumann realized that Microsoft possessed Flight Simulator. David Denhart of Aces Game Studio had archived its flight simulator work, which was given to Asobo.

The franchise's return after a 14-year time span is partially credited to the business model of Xbox Game Pass, allowing for a wider variety and diversity of games. Xbox chief Phil Spencer said that Flight Simulator is part of Microsoft's renewed commitment to PC gaming. According to Spencer, their head of global partnerships Sarah Bond worked on the Game Pass "with the indie montage" and all the games set to launch on Game Pass, then announced it for PC, as well as Xbox Game Pass Ultimate. "I didn't know if the PC community was going to be watching or not, but we went Flight Sim, we went Age, we went Wasteland—I wanted people to know that we want to make sure we're building games and supporting games that respect what the PC community loves", he elaborated. On bringing back Flight Simulator, he said: "We do have some pilots on the teams that are big fans of flight, and flight sims, and flying themselves, who are passionate about it, so we said, 'okay, let's see what we can do'." Reflecting on the legacy of the series to the aviation community, Spencer thought, "Can we do something new with Flight Sim? Can we actually move it forward in an interesting way?"

Neumann said there is a pilot shortage crisis, and he felt the simulation would "create a funnel" for future pilots. On CNN, he said:

When you meet pilots a lot of them that say 'you know what? -- my interest in this whole thing started with Microsoft Flight Sim many years ago'. Some people choose that as a career, and we do hope to inspire this new generation. Ever since we showed our trailer we've been called by almost every airplane manufacturer and they all tell us there's a pilot crisis, but for us it's about priority-setting. We're excited about making a sim, and if we can help with the pilot crisis in some shape or form - we'll try when the time is right."

Regarding the aircraft 3D scanning technology, Asobo recalled that, although scanning saves time and simplifies the work, scanning an aircraft can take a full day, depending on its size. Veteran pilots checked and ensured the accuracy of the aircraft models after scanning. Neumann met with Meteoblue, a Swiss company, to incorporate their realistic, real-time, and worldwide weather data into the product. To port realistic weather, the Earth is divided into 250 million boxes, and meteorological and climatological data are embedded in them. Further layers of data are placed higher up in the skies to the stratosphere. Using data of the forces on the weather at each location, Meteoblue's system created a set of mathematical equations incorporated in the game that forecast weather conditions.

A team of audio directors, designers, and recordists were in charge of the audio incorporated into Flight Simulator. The team worked with a pilot who provided the aircraft. They had a tight schedule of two and a half hours per day; they managed to record three planes per day. 30 aircraft types and five turbofans were recorded using Sennheiser and Audix microphones to record the audio. A Shure VP88 was used to record propeller sounds. To record cockpit sounds, a small portable rig was used that recorded in quadraphonic and ambisonic sound formats at the same time. Biome systems were used to create soundscapes for different environments and times on Earth. All of these recordings were recorded using Audiokinetic Wwise. The Azure Cognitive Services plays a role in improving the pilot and ATC automated dialogue: they built a universal text-to-speech model using 3,000 hours of data to achieve naturalness in dialogue, and used pre-built as well as volunteer-submitted audio in order to give different accents to ATCs of different regions.

Sometime after its unveiling at E3 2019, Microsoft organized a temporary Insider Program, where members could access the alpha and beta versions of the game, and provide the developers with immediate feedback, suggestions and criticism. Those willing to volunteer for the program underwent a selection session; if they were chosen, they had to sign a non-disclosure agreement (NDA) that they would not share their gameplay or their thoughts on the game's under-maintenance version. One volunteer broke their agreement and shared footage to YouTube; Microsoft used their copyrights to have the videos removed immediately. That individual lost the testing privileges. In November 2019, FSX had a beta "branch" which gained telemetry data that would help the development of Flight Simulator. It was available at no cost for all FSX and FSX Steam Version players.

=== Updates ===
Flight Simulator is constantly updated with "World Update[s]" and "Sim Update[s]". The former concerns geographically specific updates, while the latter concerns updates on the game in general. Updates in general are essential to retain the game's realistic stature, as photogrammetry may be outdated, or an early render may be inaccurate. The first was "World Update I: Japan", was released on September 29, 2020, after Tokyo Game Show 2020 Online. It features photogrammetry for Sendai, Takamatsu, Tokushima, Tokyo, Utsunomiya, and Yokohama, as well as handcrafting for Hachijojima, Kerama, Kushiro, Nagasaki, Shimojishima, and Suwanosejima airports. It adds landing challenges set in Japan. Most notable of all was during Thanksgiving 2020, when "World Update II: USA" was released. 50 structures in the United States were handcrafted, including the Las Vegas Strip, which lights up at night and four handcrafted airports: Atlanta Hartsfield–Jackson, Friday Harbor, Dallas/Fort Worth and New York Stewart.

Early into 2021, Microsoft released an update named "Let It Snow", which unveiled real-time snow and winter environments for winter locations. This is then succeeded with four World Updates concerning various places in Europe, as well as five Sim Updates including a special "Game of the Year" update, made as a tribute to fans of the game. At E3 2021, an expansion pack in response to the release of Top Gun: Maverick was announced to be released in late 2021, featuring the aircraft and carrier seen in its trailer; when the film is announced to be released much later on May 27, 2022, the expansion pack was also delayed to be released alongside the film. In 2022, three new updates were implemented concerning Australia, the Iberian Peninsula, and Italy, Malta and Vatican City, as well as one Sim Update and a second update for United States territories, which also added Halo Infinite’s Pelican as new aircraft. In August 2022, a 40th Anniversary Edition update was announced, which arrived in November 2022. As a tribute to the franchise's long-running trajectory, the update included several historical planes, helicopters and gliders, along with classic airports and missions from previous installations of the franchise. An expansion based on Dune and Dune: Part Two is set to be released on November 3, 2023.

Microsoft frequently receives feedback from users of Flight Simulator via their forums, including requests for helicopters, structure updates, inaccurate detail fixes, and the need for improved systems. Some fixes have been made, others are planned, are under investigation, or have begun. The Flight Simulator team constantly receives feedback from players and has said the game is updated when it is received.

== Release ==
The first people to play Flight Simulator — journalists, bloggers, influencers, and flight simmers — were invited by the developer team to Rainier Flight Service, a flight school in Renton, Washington. Attendees also flew post-gameplay in a real Cessna aircraft with Justin Fancher, Rainier's flight instructor. On July 13, 2020, Microsoft began accepting preorders, and on August 18, 2020, Flight Simulator became available for the PC. The company said the game was the largest release in its history, and announced three versions of the title—Standard, Deluxe, and Premium Deluxe—each providing an incremental set of airplanes to fly and additional airports with more detailed scenery and objects. In addition to digital licenses from Microsoft Store and Steam, the game is also available on the PC version of the Xbox Game Pass subscription service, allowing for the first one-month play of the Standard version of Flight Simulator for just US$1, as opposed to the normal purchase price of US$69, and at US$3.99 for subsequent months subscriptions.

At E3 2021, Microsoft announced that the game would be released for Xbox Series X and Series S on July 27, 2021, with undated announcements going back to December 11, 2020. Anticipating a wider range of players, Microsoft made several modifications in order to make gameplay more accessible, like adding four more tutorial sequences, diversifying the AI abilities, as well as adding the option of slander floats and skis in aircraft so that it can land anywhere. Indeed, the game was released on the platform on time as announced. Video game critics were provided a preview of it several days ahead of public release. A Microsoft spokesperson stated that plans for its release on Xbox One will be discussed sometime in 2021, although Microsoft stated that the Series X version of the game would be playable on Xbox One via Xbox Cloud Gaming in 2022. It was later released on Xbox One and Cloud Gaming on March 1, the latter allowing gameplay on smartphones, tablets, and PCs with lower-than-required specifications. Bluetooth and Xbox Wireless Controllers are also supported with the Cloud.

The game is available for purchase worldwide, except for China; although some aspiring Chinese players are finding ways to purchase it via Steam and the Microsoft Store. Microsoft did not explain why it is unavailable in China, but it has been suggested by the South China Morning Post that it could be an "approval issue", a lack of Internet capacity for the Azure data services to "keep it running smoothly", or because of the high quality of the mapping data used "that would potentially bring up a lot of issues with the content for Chinese regulators".

=== Other releases ===
Aerosoft's physical release of the Standard edition came on ten DVDs. Its physical nature allows for installing with slower Internet connections.

Aerosoft, a German developer and publisher of simulation software, announced in July 2020 that they partnered with Microsoft to release a physical version in Europe. Released corresponding with the PC, the physical version is more suitable to install from for those with slower Internet connections. It is available in two editions, Standard and Premium Deluxe and comes with 10 dual-layer DVDs, a printed manual, and a keyboard reference chart. The DVDs are each able to store a maximum of 8.5 gigabytes (GB), and so contain around 85 GB of data that consists of the installer and basic content, including aircraft and the standard-definition default world; however, an Internet connection allows the patches and updates to be downloaded during installation. An active Internet connection is needed for the simulator to update itself when needed. As with the digital versions, after installation the game does not require an active Internet connection and can be played offline; users also have the option to stream more details for the world, better ground imagery, real-world weather and ATC data from Microsoft's servers.

Project leader Jörg Neumann stated that a virtual reality (VR) version of Flight Simulator was the "very first feedback" they received after the unveiling at E3 2019, however aspirations of creating a VR version in the game series has been in his mind as far as 2016. They only started developing it in June 2019. In July at a developer livestream on Twitch, they announced a VR version of Flight Simulator. It was later released on December 22, 2020, designated as a free update. While it was previously announced to only be supported on Microsoft Mixed Reality devices, Asobo announced that it is supported on all OpenXR and SteamVR devices The first device that will be supporting the game is Hewlett-Packard's Reverb G2; it was the headset's launch title. Support for other devices will be launched after the Reverb launches. In the VR version, two new tutorials were released, including one using the Airbus A320neo. Corresponding with the VR update, "real-time snow and true-to-life ice coverage to the entire planet" was introduced by Microsoft. Microsoft announced "new performance optimizations" which reduces the complications of the "hefty" required specifications: an i5-8400/Ryzen 5 1500X, GTX 970, and 16 GB of RAM.

== Reception ==
=== Critical response ===
Reception

Aggregate scores
Aggregator	Score
Metacritic	PC: 91/100; XSX: 90/100
OpenCritic	98% recommend

Review scores
Publication	Score
Eurogamer	(PC) Essential (XSXS) Essential
GameRevolution	4.5/5
GameSpot	9/10
IGN	10/10
Jeuxvideo.com	18/20
PC Gamer (US)	89/100
PCGamesN	9/10
PCMag	4.5/5
Shacknews	9/10
The Guardian	5/5
VentureBeat	95/100
VG247	5/5
Common Sense Media	5/5

Awards
Publication	Award
The Game Awards 2020	Best Sim/Strategy Game
Steam Awards	Sit Back And Relax (Nominated)
17th British Academy Games Awards	Technical Achievement (Nominated)
24th Annual D.I.C.E. Awards	Strategy/Simulation Game of the Year; Outstanding Technical Achievement (Nominated)
SXSW Gaming Awards 2021	Excellence in Technical Achievement
The Game Awards 2021	Best Sim/Strategy Game (Nominated)

Microsoft Flight Simulator, within PC as well as Xbox Series X and Series S, received "universal acclaim" from video game critics, according to review aggregator website Metacritic. Within the site, the game is rated the third-best PC game of 2020, behind Half-Life: Alyx and Hades, as well as the tenth most discussed game. On OpenCritic, another aggregator, it was rated "Mighty" based on 86 critics, along with the summary: "Microsoft Flight Simulator is a technical marvel, with an insane amount of polish, incredible realism, and phenomenal controls." Many reviewers have placed it among the best games of the year and a gaming essential, with Kat Bailey of USGamer awarding it August 2020's Game of the Month.

Reviewers considered the graphics and realism of Flight Simulator as the reason it stands out, with Tokarev Kirill of 80 LEVEL and Chad Sapieha of Common Sense Media describing its authenticity as unprecedented, and other critics calling it an aesthetic feat within PC gaming. It has also been said to be a one-of-a-kind masterpiece that appears once a generation, and is predicted to see everlasting legacy. Despite some technical issues, Engadget's Devindra Hardawar found the VR version of the game realistic, to the extent that its visuals resonated with him. Shacknews and VG247 described the game as revolutionary within the series, as it is the first entry to be used widely by those outside the aviation community. Thus, many critics suggest that non-aviation lovers will also adore the game, especially due to its inherent futuristic sensation. Mark Hachman of PC World also opines that the game allows for a free exploration of Earth, without worrying about contributing to climate change. It has been labeled the best-looking video game of all time as well as the best-looking flight simulator, albeit being disclaimed as a still-imperfect "work in progress".

The Xbox Series X and Series S version was also raved among reviewers, with the accessibility additions being praised. Most reviews focused mainly on the graphical and visual side. Although the graphics are noted to be smaller, with the resolution of the affordable, US$299 version downgraded from 4K to 1080p, it did not ruin the experience, which was still similar to the original. The frame rate was also found to be better than the PC version. Contemporarily, it was considered the best releases for the platform, and was described as next-generation. According to Matt Brown of Windows Central, the memorable hint within the game's visual still retains. He recommended the Series X version over the Series S, though stated the Series S is also great. Poor accessory support was also stressed upon its release. Many reviewers were dismayed over the lack of gameplay difference from the PC, with the use of controls being described as irritating. Because of the game's routine updates prior to the Xbox release, Gianluca Musso of the Italian Eurogamer opined that Xbox players have more enjoyment than PC players, at least from that viewpoint; he also recommended it as a Series X and Series S starter.

The mainstream media also viewed Flight Simulator in a positive light. According to Paul Sillers, writing for CNN, Flight Simulator might be "the safest way to travel" during the COVID-19 pandemic, and because of the global economic conditions in the wake of COVID-19, is being used by furloughed pilots to keep their skills fresh. As "a comprehensive simulator that steadily guides players from square one to being able to fly, combined with kitchen-sink graphics", The Guardian concluded that Flight Simulator "captures the wonder of flight, and the spiritual and emotional rush of seeing the world in a different way". Writing for The New York Times, Farhad Manjoo describes the game as "more than a technical achievement or a marketing demo", writing the experience it offers is akin to an online life. "The game plunged me into sustained meditations on the permeability between the real [and online world]—[offering] me some hope of a more realistic kind of online life in the future."

=== Sales and player base ===
Within the first few weeks of release, more than one million unique users had played Microsoft Flight Simulator, making it the largest launch in Xbox Game Pass for PC history at the time. Microsoft said those players had completed more than 26 million flights and flown more than 1 billion miles by that time. By December 2022, Microsoft said that more than 10 million "pilots" had played across Windows, Xbox Cloud Gaming and Xbox consoles, logging 500 million flights and 40 billion miles. In September 2024, Microsoft said that 15 million people had used the simulator since launch; Neumann contrasted that figure with Microsoft Flight Simulator X, which he said had taken 16 years to reach 5 million users. Market intelligence firm Jon Peddie Research noted in August 2020 that simulator enthusiasts are among the most active gamers online, projecting that Flight Simulator fans would spend $2.6 billion over the next three years on the game. Peddie also predicted that there would be more than 2.27 million copies sold, and that Intel, Nvidia, and Advanced Micro Devices (AMD) might benefit from this, as the game is shown to have operational shortcomings, which may increase the demand for more advanced graphics processing units (GPUs) and central processing units (CPUs). Following its console debut, the Xbox version was the third best-selling game across Xbox platforms in the U.S. in July 2021. Microsoft Flight Simulator dropped to fifth-position in the Xbox charts the following month.

=== Audience response ===
Game developer Rami Ismail conducted a casual test of the accuracy of the game performing an in-game real-time flight from Montreal to Amsterdam while simultaneously travelling commercially on that same route and found the game's flight to be accurate within minutes of the real flight. He described the game "absolutely staggering" and "wild". Investigative journalist Giancarlo Fiorella used the game to detour around El Helicoide, currently a building used for detaining political prisoners in Venezuela and SEBIN offices in Bolivia, the northeastern area of Damascus, Battle of Aleppo sites, and the Uyghur camps in Xinjiang. He concluded the game is not a viable tool for geolocation and investigative works, but said that if it improves to absolute realism, it "might actually help us with geolocation when we’re trying to figure out where a video or picture was taken".

A Diamond DA62 in Lagoa Nova approaches a deep abyss, an error of the game's terrain system. Neumann acknowledged the discovery, and thought that "it was cool". It has since been fixed and no longer exists.

Initial criticism focused on the simulator's loading times. On Steam, the long in-game installation frustrated many users, forcing them to exceed two hours of gameplay and lose the right to a refund. This resulted in a review bomb, several users demanding refunds and the game's rating dropping. However, Doug Lombardi, Vice President of Steam's owner Valve, says they have addressed this issue. The download times had been either slow or stuck. Windows Central said such bugs are expected saying: "Just remember, it's launch day." There were also reports that features exclusive to the Deluxe and Premium Deluxe version could not be loaded. PCGamesN compared the problem to a delayed flight: although it may irritate passengers at first, the result will do otherwise.

Some users reported inaccuracies in rendering buildings like the Washington Monument in Washington, D.C., and Buckingham Palace in London, which were mistakenly rendered as a generic skyscraper and an office block, respectively. Because of a typographical error in the height of a Melbourne suburban building in OpenStreetMap, data which had been used by Bing Maps and then used by Asobo, the flight simulator initially rendered a two-storey building as 212 storeys—inserting an improbably thin and tall skyscraper into the suburb. Users also discovered the system is unable to render palm trees, making them into obelisks "jutting forth from the pavement like so many teeth". The TIAA Bank Field in Jacksonville, Florida had also been misrendered as an office building with grass roofs. Many users on the Flight Simulator support forums also reported instability and game crashes without an obvious cause. Despite this, Tom Warren of The Verge said "the glitches are more amusing than they are game breaking". Engadget's Jessica Conditt opined such bugs represent what the amateur flight simulation genre is all about: creating a planet sandbox where players can do whatever they want.

Further negatives were voiced by pilots, expressing disappointment with the game's unrealistic aerodynamics and the aircraft's "sluggish" response. At Gizmodo, a pilot commented on the overly sensitive control surfaces at slow airspeeds, noting that it could be fixed "if the physics model accounted more for reduced airflow over [them]".

=== Popular destinations ===
Large numbers of users have been attracted to several destinations. In August 2020, many players went to Little Saint James, an island in the US Virgin Islands, where the child sex offender Jeffrey Epstein reportedly molested underage girls. YouTubers and Redditors shared their experiences and shared the island's coordinates. The Independent opines that the conspiracy theories of which the Epstein case are the subject are a main driver of interest. It was quickly noted that the game failed to render the island in a detailed fashion; Vice noticed the game does not include the island's iconic dome and said the activity "is just another way for people to satisfy their fascination with one of the most horrible stories in recent memory, and not that different than sending drones to film the island and chartering private boats to explore its buildings". In addition, many players have travelled to their own homes via the game, with Asobo revealing in a November 2020 survey that 70% of players had immediately flown to their homes or hometown.

Flight Simulator's weather has been noted for incorporating real-time data of notable weather abnormalities. During the 2020 Western United States fires, players discovered that smoke from the wildfires had been incorporated into the game's weather model and was visible to players. Although details were not perfectly accurate, Polygon journalist Austen Goslin stated that it "does help to contextualize just how big the fires are, and how much of [California] is impacted by them". As Hurricane Laura was approaching Texas and Louisiana, players flew inside the Category 4 hurricane. The Washington Post added the inaccuracy of the wind speeds, and that the hurricane did not swirl. Mathias Müller, head of Meteoblue said: "Yesterday’s hurricane was very beautiful to look at and was accurately predicted by our models even days ahead. We are very happy that real-time weather is now part of Flight Simulator. It was a long journey as integrating these massive amounts of data required the solution of many problems." He said that Laura inspired them to improve Flight Simulator's weather quality.

The Suez Canal soon became popularized among players following the obstruction of the canal by the Ever Given ship, with the vessel later becoming a downloadable mod. Players using it shared their flights on social media.

== See also ==
- 2020 in video games
- List of video games considered the best
