= YSFlight =

Open-source flight simulator

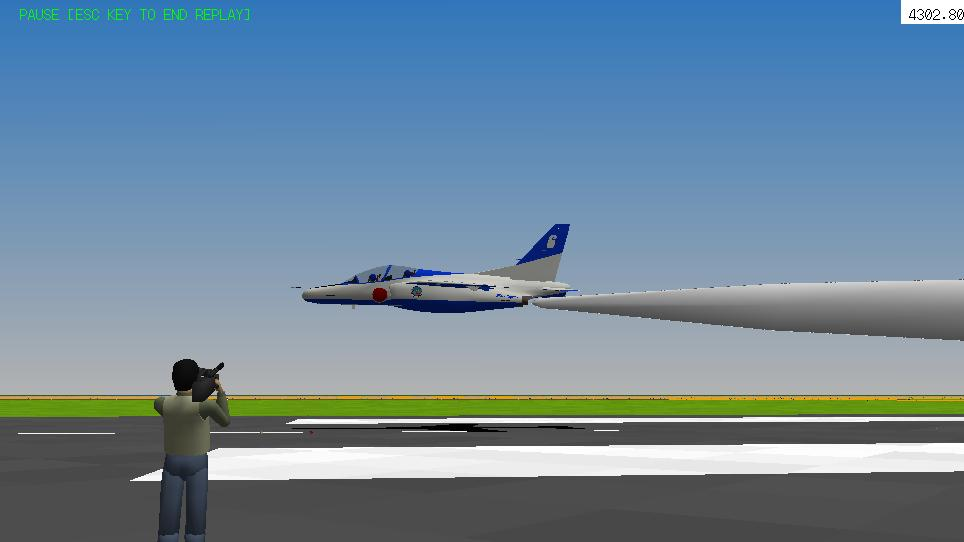
- A Kawasaki T-4 flies at low level in YSFlight
- Developer: Soji Yamakawa
- Release: April 15, 1999
- Stable release: 20181124 / November 24, 2018; 7 years ago
- Written in: C++
- Operating system: Windows, Linux, macOS
- Size: 20 MB
- Available in: English, Japanese
- Type: Flight simulator
- License: BSD-3-Clause
- Website: ysflight.org
- Repository: github.com/captainys/YSFLIGHT

YSFlight is a free, open-source multi-platform flight simulator, developed and published by Soji Yamakawa since 1999. Since its initial release, it received annual updates up to 2015, with the most recent stable version released in 2018.

== History ==
Development of YSFlight began in 1998 as a solo project by Soji Yamakawa. He first started working on the simulator as a school project; afterwards, it was further developed into a flight aid for others who need assistance in understanding aircraft flight instrumentation and flight physics. Initially designed to be run by lower-end computers, the flight simulator began to implement more updated graphical features with its 2015 release.

On August 19, 2022, Yamakawa published YSFlight's source code and assets to GitHub under the BSD-3-Clause license, while stating that he intends to continue the simulator's development.

== Features ==
YSFlight differs from other simulators, such as the Microsoft Flight Simulator series, in its intentionally low-detail graphical design. This allows the simulator to be run by lower-end computers, with system requirements being much less than most other flight simulators.

It allows for to YSFlight clients to join a multiplayer server.

The simulator comes with a selection of 73 aircraft models and 16 maps, which range from real life locations (including the default map, a depiction of Japan's Aomori Prefecture) to fictitious maps.

The simulator uses Direct3D 9 and OpenGL 2.0.

== See also ==
- FlightGear
- Microsoft Flight Simulator
- X-Plane (simulator)
