= Microsoft Flight Simulator X =

Flight simulation computer game

- Developers: Aces Game Studio; Dovetail Games (Steam)
- Publishers: Microsoft Game Studios; Dovetail Games (Steam)
- Designers: Brandon Seltz; John Feil; Cendol Justin Wood; Patrick Cook; Paul Lange
- Composer: Stan LePard
- Series: Microsoft Flight Simulator
- Platform: Windows
- Release: EU: October 13, 2006; NA: October 17, 2006; AU: October 26, 2006; WW: December 18, 2014 (Steam)
- Genre: Flight simulation
- Modes: Single-player, multiplayer

Microsoft Flight Simulator X (FSX) is a 2006 flight simulation video game originally developed by Aces Game Studio and published by Microsoft Game Studios for Microsoft Windows. It is the sequel to Microsoft Flight Simulator 2004: A Century of Flight and the tenth installment of the Microsoft Flight Simulator series, which was first released in 1982. It is built on an upgraded graphics rendering engine, showcasing DirectX 10 features in Windows Vista and was marketed by Microsoft as the most important technological milestone in the series at the time. FSX is the first version in the series to be released on DVD media.

In December 2012, over six years after its release, the FSX multiplayer matchmaking system over the GameSpy network was discontinued. On July 8, 2014, Dovetail Games, the developer of Train Simulator, announced that it had signed a licensing agreement with Microsoft to continue development on FSX and the production of new content. On December 18, 2014, the FSX: Steam Edition version of the simulator was made available through digital distribution via Steam. The updated release of FSX includes support for Windows 8.1 and later, along with updated hosting of FSX multiplayer features through Steam.

It is the last version of Microsoft Flight Simulator to support Windows XP, Vista, 7, 8, and 8.1.

== Overview ==
Flight Simulator X marks the tenth version of the popular line of flight simulators. It was officially released to the US market on October 17, 2006. According to Microsoft's Web site for the game, a standard edition features everything from navaids to GPS and airways. It also includes 18 planes, 28 detailed cities, and over 24,000 airports with a deluxe version featuring 24 aircraft, and 38 cities. The player can fly anything from a small glider or a light experimental aircraft to jumbo jets. The game features an immersive air traffic control system and dynamic real-world condition weather. The geography matches the part of the world that the player is flying in. Jetways and ground equipment are also included in the game.

Flight Simulator X was officially unveiled at the 2006 International Consumer Electronics Show (CES) as a gaming showcase for Microsoft Windows Vista and is now also compatible with Windows 7, and with Windows 8 or Windows 10 via Steam. Microsoft released screenshots as well as a list of frequently asked questions as a press release on Microsoft Flight Simulator Insider, and numerous flight simulator communities. This also included mission-based gameplay with mission specific aircraft as well as an upgraded rendering engine capable of increased detail. Following the Electronic Entertainment Expo (E3) in May 2006, Microsoft published new screenshots, videos and an official trailer. The graphical quality of the simulator has greatly increased.

On January 22, 2009, it was reported that development team behind the product was being heavily affected by Microsoft's ongoing job cuts, with indications that the entire Flight Simulator team would be laid off. The news was later confirmed by Microsoft officials stating they were committed to the Flight Simulator franchise, with expectations to continue product releases in the series, but had nothing specific to announce at that time. On August 17, 2010, Microsoft announced Microsoft Flight, a new simulation game that boasted a further-improved graphics engine and enhanced simulation features. In April 2012, Flight was released. In August 2012, further development of Flight was cancelled by Microsoft.

== Features ==
=== Deluxe Edition ===
Flight Simulator X was released in two editions: Standard and Deluxe. Compared to the Standard Edition, the Deluxe Edition incorporates additional features, including an on-disc software development kit (SDK), three airplanes with the Garmin G1000 Flightdeck, and the ability for the player to act as Air traffic control (ATC) for other online users with a radar screen.

The Deluxe Edition added pilotable – Grumman G-21A Goose, Maule Orion M-7-260-C Super Rocket, and G1000 furnished versions of the Beechcraft Baron 58, Cessna C172SP Skyhawk, and the Mooney M-20-M Bravo.

The Acceleration pack added further aircraft – Agusta Westland AW101, Boeing F/A-18 Hornet, and a racing version of the P-51D Mustang.

Microsoft Flight Simulator X: Gold Edition combines the Deluxe Edition and the Acceleration expansion pack into one box. However, if not installing Acceleration, which includes service packs 1 & 2, one should manually install those service packs separately. See below.

=== New features ===
New features included in Flight Simulator X include:

- Improved graphics
- Airports with animated jetways and improved ground services
- Ability for players to be an Air Traffic Controller
- Support for DirectX 10 (in preview mode)
- Proprietary SimConnect API allows FSUIPC-like access to Flight Simulator functions and variables
- Advanced Animations, including wing flex

=== Scenery and weather ===
Base scenery is automatically generated using data provided from Navteq while airport and real-world weather data were provided by Jeppesen. This provides the simulation with information to create a facsimile of the real world with accurate airport layouts, terrain information, and road networks. Major airports and landmarks, such as Stonehenge, Victoria Falls and Charles Lindbergh's grave are further improved through custom object modelling and photorealistic aerial imagery. Some animations such as fireworks are time triggered, that is, they only appear on certain dates or times.

=== Missions and rewards ===
The inclusion of "Missions" adds a new facet to the simulation, adding task-oriented goals and encouraging users to fly worldwide, rather than just from their home field. Although a similar concept was available in previous versions, the new implementation of multipath & event-oriented situations substantially extends the potential for user interaction. Pilots have the ability earn achievements through the "Rewards" functionality, for completing missions and reaching specific accomplishments throughout the "Free Flight" mode. Some missions have multiple and hidden rewards, receipt being dependent on actions during the mission.

=== Learning Center ===
The Learning Center has been carried over from FS2004, which introduces the user to the various features of FSX. Flying lessons are included (and improved from previous versions), voiced over by real-life pilot and instructor Rod Machado. The user can fly a checkride at the end of the learning process. Completion of these various check rides certify the user with simulated pilot ratings (e.g. Private Pilot, Commercial Pilot, Airline Transport Pilot, etc.).

=== Artificial intelligence ===
Artificial intelligence (AI) aircraft are non-playable aircraft built primarily for scenery and ambience. They sometimes also play a key role in missions. Three aircraft (the McDonnell Douglas MD-83, the Piper Cherokee, and the de Havilland Dash 8) are present in the simulation as AI aircraft only. In addition to aircraft, more basic road vehicle and shipping is present.

== Patches and expansions ==
=== Service Pack 1 ===
Microsoft released the first service pack (ServicePack1) for Flight Simulator X on May 15, 2007, to address:

- activation and installation issues
- Performance enhancements, including multithreading of texture synthesis and autogen to provide modest performance improvements on multi-core computers
- Third-party add-on issues
- Content issues

=== Service Pack 2 ===
Microsoft released another service pack for Flight Simulator X about the same time as its expansion pack. The update is primarily for Vista users that had DirectX 10 compatible graphics adapters. This version takes advantage of DX10's improved shader model and more pixel pipelines and increased performance for Vista, approaching overall FSX performance on XP. It also adds the capability for players who do not have the expansion pack to participate in multiplayer activities with users of the expansion pack, along with support for multi-core processors. FSX-SP2 also fixes some more bugs over the original release of Flight Simulator X. SP1 is not compatible with SP2 or Acceleration in Multiplayer. Players with SP1 cannot enter a session with players who have SP2 or Acceleration in Multiplayer. In order to install SP2, SP1 must be installed already, which includes at least one run of FSX SP1, causing registry updates, before SP2 will properly install.

=== Flight Simulator X: Acceleration ===
Microsoft released an expansion pack for Flight Simulator X, titled Flight Simulator X: Acceleration, on October 23, 2007, in North America.

=== Version Identification ===
There are two ways to identify the version of a particular FSX installation. Within the program, while in flight, the Help menu includes an About option, which lists the product version code. That code is also available by finding the file fsx.exe and clicking its properties Details tab.

The product version numbers translate as follows

- 10.0.60905 Base FSX (Deluxe or Standard Edition)
- 10.0.61355 Service Pack 1
- 10.0.61472 Service Pack 2
- 10.0.61637 Acceleration Expansion Pack (includes SP2)

=== DirectX 10 Update ===
A preview of the DirectX 10 rendering engine was available with later versions of FSX. This update brought improvements to the look and feel of the simulator, most notably in the scenery aspect. Water and terrain in particular, became much more vibrant, with accurate reflections and lighting. Users could easily switch back to DirectX 9 via a toggle in the settings menu.

== Music ==
The soundtrack used in the main menu for Flight Simulator X was composed, orchestrated and produced by the Seattle-based musician Stan LePard. The default audio track, named "Pilot for Hire" or "FSX01" in the game gained nostalgic prominence with users, and is featured in Microsoft Flight Simulator (2020) as a menu music option titled "Legacy".

== Re-releases and sequels ==
=== Lockheed Martin Prepar3D ===
In late 2007, Aces Games Studio announced the release of licenses to use Microsoft Enterprise Simulation Platform, the engine which Microsoft Flight Simulator X is based on, to companies who would like to use the technology to create products. Following the closure of Aces Game Studio in January 2009, American Aerospace company Lockheed Martin announced in late 2009 that they had negotiated with Microsoft a licensing agreement to purchase the intellectual property (including source code) for the Microsoft ESP, with the code-base of Flight Simulator X Service Pack 2. Lockheed Martin announced that the new product based upon the ESP source code would be called Prepar3D, a simulation tool intended for students, military and commercial operators to use primarily as an open world simulator. Lockheed Martin hired members of the original Aces Game Studio team to continue further development of the product.

The first release of Prepar3D was released in November 2010. As of April 2024, the latest version of Prepar3D is Prepar3D v6.1. The simulator offers a number of advantages over Flight Simulator X, including updated scenery, vehicles and weather, as well as engine updates and rewrites including the transition to DirectX 12 and 64 bit architecture.

While some add-ons developed for FSX are compatible with earlier versions of Prepar3D, due to significant changes in its codebase, may no longer work as intended.

=== Microsoft Flight Simulator X: Steam Edition ===
On December 18, 2014, Dovetail Games re-released Flight Simulator X on Steam, titled Microsoft Flight Simulator X: Steam Edition. It includes content provided with the original release of FSX: Gold Edition. This includes FSX: Deluxe Edition, the Acceleration expansion pack and both official Service Packs. The Steam Edition also includes an overhaul of the multiplayer functionality to use Steam rather than the then-defunct GameSpy, improved stability on Windows 7 and 8, and minor performance tweaks including a complete recompile using Visual Studio 2013.

Additionally, Dovetail Games worked with various addon developers and publishers to distribute their content on Steam as Downloadable Content. As of June 2021, there are 272 add-ons available on the Steam DLC store from a variety of third-party developers including Aerosoft, Carenado, and Virtavia.

Additionally, most add-ons developed for the original releases of FSX are compatible with FSX: Steam Edition.

=== Flight Sim World ===
In May 2017, Dovetail Games announced Flight Sim World, based on Flight Simulator X, and released later that month. Only a year later, on April 23, 2018, Dovetail announced end of development of Flight Sim World and the end of sales effective May 15, 2018.

=== Microsoft Flight ===
In February 2012, Microsoft released a new flight simulator titled Microsoft Flight. Developed by The Coalition (as Microsoft Game Studios Vancouver), it was not part of the Microsoft Flight Simulator series, but instead was designed to replace it and aimed at drawing new users into flight simulation. It does not allow the use of existing Flight Simulator X add-ons (including aircraft, objects, and scenery).

On July 26, 2012, Microsoft cancelled further development of Flight.

=== Microsoft Flight Simulator (2020) ===
On June 9, 2019, as part of their E3 conference announcements Microsoft revealed that they would be bringing back the Flight Simulator series with an updated release, simply titled Microsoft Flight Simulator. On the same day, Microsoft launched a new website for the title and posted a teaser video on their Xbox YouTube channel. It was released on August 18, 2020, for Windows 10.

== Reception ==
Reception

Aggregate scores
| Aggregator | Score |
|---|---|
| GameRankings | 80% |
| Metacritic | 80/100 |

Review scores
| Publication | Score |
|---|---|
| GameSpot | 8.4/10 |
| IGN | 7.0/10 |

In the United States alone, Microsoft Flight Simulator X had sold 1 million copies by late 2008. The game received generally favorable reviews. On Metacritic, the game holds 80/100 based on 28 critics, thus indicating "generally favorable reviews". On GameRankings, it holds 80%, based on 28 reviews.

IGN gave Microsoft Flight Simulator X a 7.0/10, criticizing its framerate and lack of graphical improvement over its predecessor Microsoft Flight Simulator 2004: A Century of Flight.

GameSpot gave the game an 8.4/10, praising the game's attention to detail, realism, graphical improvements, and approachable missions. However, the review also pointed out framerate issues on most computers back in 2006.

In August 2016, Microsoft Flight Simulator X placed 23rd on Time's The 50 Best Video Games of All Time list.

The editors of PC Gamer US presented Flight Simulator X with their 2006 "Best Simulation Game" award.

The Academy of Interactive Arts & Sciences awarded Microsoft Flight Simulator X with "Simulation Game of the Year" at the 10th Annual Interactive Achievement Awards.

== See also ==
- List of Games for Windows titles
- FlightGear
- X-Plane
