= IL-2 =

IL2 or IL-2 may refer to:

- Ilyushin Il-2 Shturmovik, a World War II era Soviet ground attack aircraft;
- IL-2 Sturmovik (series), a series of games named after the Ilyushin Il-2 aircraft:

- IL-2 Sturmovik (video game), a 2001 video game, the first in the series;
- IL-2 Sturmovik: Forgotten Battles, a 2003 sequel to the IL-2 Sturmovik video game;
- IL-2 Sturmovik: 1946, the 2006 final compilation of all precedent IL-2 Sturmovik video game add-ons;
- IL-2 Sturmovik: Birds of Prey, a 2009 sequel to the IL-2 Sturmovik video game, mainly destined to video game consoles;
- IL-2 Sturmovik: Cliffs of Dover, a 2011 sequel to the original IL-2 Sturmovik video game, using a new game engine and thus the second generation of video games in the IL-2 Sturmovik series;
- IL-2 Sturmovik: Great Battles, a 2013 sequel to the original IL-2 Sturmovik video game, the third generation in the IL-2 Sturmovik series, again, because of using a different game engine.

- Interleukin 2, a cytokine glycoprotein that stimulates the growth of T cell lymphocytes and provides other biochemical signaling to the immune system;

- IL-2 receptor, a protein that binds and responds to interleukin 2;

- Illinois's 2nd congressional district;
- Illinois Route 2, a north–south state road in northern Illinois;
- I-League 2nd Division, the second-highest division overall in the Indian system of football leagues.
