= Pilot wings =

Pilot wings may refer to:

- Pilotwings, a flight simulator game series
  - Pilotwings (video game), a flight simulator game for Super NES
  - Pilotwings 64, a sequel for Nintendo 64
  - Pilotwings Resort, a flight simulator game for Nintendo 3DS
- Aviator badge
- Aircrew Badge
- Aircrew brevet, a badge worn by qualified aircrew in several air forces and armies
