= IL-2 Sturmovik (series) =

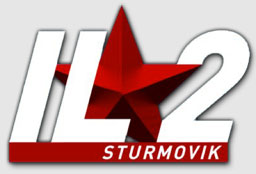
- The original IL-2 Sturmovik logo that 1C:Maddox Games designed back in 2001
- Genre: Combat flight simulator
- Developers: 1C:Maddox Games, Team Fusion Simulations and 1C Game Studios
- Publishers: 1C, Ubisoft
- Platform: Microsoft Windows
- First release: IL-2 Sturmovik; November 18, 2001
- Latest release: Korea. IL-2 Series; August 4, 2026

IL-2 Sturmovik (Russian: Ил-2 Штурмовик) is a series of World War II combat flight simulation video games originally created in 2001 by Russian video game developer Maddox Games under the brand name 1C:Maddox Games, following its association with 1C Company. Maddox Games left 1C Company in 2011. Since 2012, 1C's new developers are 1C Game Studios (who develops the Great Battles series of simulation games) and Team Fusion Simulations (who develops the Dover series of simulation games). Thus, 1C Company currently owns the IL-2 Sturmovik label and runs three different accumulated generations of IL-2 games (three generations of IL-2 games have been established as three different game engine stages have been developed since 2001).

The series covers a number of flyable aircraft of Soviet, German, American, British, Japanese, French, Italian, Romanian, Czechoslovak, Polish and other origins. Different games of the series cover different theaters of World War II, including the Eastern Front, the Western Front and the Pacific theater.

== History ==
IL-2 Sturmovik games spans three generations :

- The first game in the series, IL-2 Sturmovik, was first released on 18 November 2001. This started the original line of IL-2 Sturmovik games which in the present day is officially titled IL-2 Sturmovik: 1946 as this was the title of its "Complete Edition" back in 2006, the final compilation of add-ons in the first generation of IL-2 games.
- The development of a completely different game engine in the series, introduced in 2011 upon release of IL-2 Sturmovik: Cliffs of Dover, started the second generation of games in the series.

Almost immediately after Cliffs of Dover was released, Maddox Games left 1C Company. In 2012 a group of volunteers named "Team Fusion" took over Maddox Games and started working on Cliffs of Dover, fixing bugs and improving the game. This led in December 2017 to the release of a new version of the game (named Cliffs of Dover – Blitz) and in August 2020 to the first add-on in the second generation of IL-2 games: IL-2 Sturmovik: Desert Wings – Tobruk.

- As of December 2012, the other 1C's developer is 1C Game Studios, formed after association with video game developer 777 Studios, mostly known for developing and releasing the 2009 Rise of Flight simulator. The first game of this collaboration, and the latest title in the IL-2 Sturmovik series, started the third generation of games in the series, IL-2 Sturmovik: Great Battles, which was released in November 2013 under the title IL-2 Sturmovik: Battle of Stalingrad.

As of 2017 the entire third generation is titled IL-2 Sturmovik: Great Battles. In the Great Battles series each game is considered as a "module". All modules share the same game engine and install. Buying a module merely unlocks the relevant content. Content works across modules, so buying one module allows you to fly the planes from that module on the maps and as part of the career of the other modules. The career mode also allows progression across modules.

Modules have been released for World War 2, but there are also 4 modules for the Great War, called Flying Circus. These modules all share the same map. The planes in the Flying Circus are based on a predecessor game by the same studio, Rise of Flight.

== Games ==
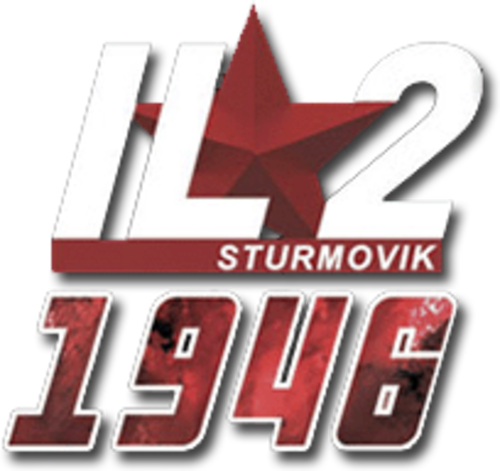
First generation

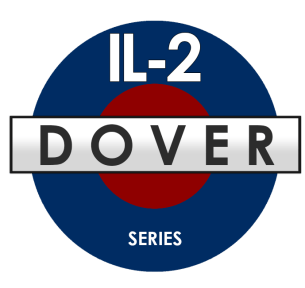
Second generation

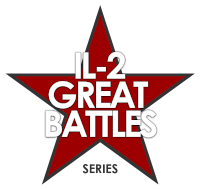
Third generation

=== First generation of games (IL-2 Sturmovik: 1946) ===
Title	Year	System	Publisher	Metacritic score (PC)	Comments
IL-2 Sturmovik	2001	Windows	Ubisoft	91/100	Standalone game
IL-2 Sturmovik: Forgotten Battles	2003	Windows	Ubisoft	86/100	Standalone game
IL-2 Sturmovik: Forgotten Battles - Ace Expansion Pack	2004	Windows	Ubisoft	85/100	Add-on
IL-2 Sturmovik: Forgotten Battles - Gold Pack	2004	Windows	Ubisoft		Standalone game
Pacific Fighters	2004	Windows	Ubisoft	76/100	Standalone game
Pe-2 Peshka	2006	Windows	Ubisoft		Add-on
Sturmoviks over Manchuria	2006	Windows	Ubisoft		Add-on
IL-2 Sturmovik: 1946	2006	Windows	Ubisoft	86/100	Add-on
IL-2 Sturmovik: 1946 - Complete Edition	2006	Windows	Ubisoft		Standalone game
IL-2 Sturmovik: Birds of Prey	2009	Windows, 360, PS3, PSP, NDS	1C Company	78/100	Standalone game
Wings of Prey	2009	Windows	1C Company	78/100	Standalone game

=== Second generation of games (Dover series) ===
The modules all run on Windows and are published by 1C Company.

Title	Year	System	Metacritic score	Comments
IL-2 Sturmovik: Cliffs of Dover	2011	Windows	60/100	Standalone game, has been replaced by Blitz
IL-2 Sturmovik: Cliffs of Dover – Blitz	2017	Windows	70/100	Standalone game, currently the official basic game
IL-2 Sturmovik: Desert Wings – Tobruk	2020	Windows	85/100	Add-on

=== Third generation of games (Great Battles series) ===
All modules share the same installation and game engine. On Steam, Battle of Stalingrad is listed as the base game, and all other modules are DLCs for that game. When buying through the developer's website, any module can be bought by itself and that will unlock the relevant content.

Each module generally comes with its own map and a collection of planes. The modules all run on Windows and are developed and published by 1C Game Studios (1CGS).

Battle of Stalingrad has a Metacritic rating of 74/100, although this reflects the state of the game on release and is very outdated given how much development there has been since to the game engine and how much additional content has been released.

==== World War 2 Flight sims ====
Title	Year	Comments
IL-2 Sturmovik: Battle of Stalingrad	2013	Base game on Steam
IL-2 Sturmovik: Battle of Moscow	2016	
IL-2 Sturmovik: Battle of Kuban	2018	
IL-2 Sturmovik: Battle of Bodenplatte	2019	
IL-2 Sturmovik: Battle of Normandy	2022	
IL-2 Sturmovik: Odessa and Leningrad - Siege and Liberation	2025	

==== World War 1 Flight sims ====
Title	Year	Comments
IL-2 Sturmovik: Flying Circus - Volume I	2019	Map shared between the FC modules
IL-2 Sturmovik: Flying Circus - Volume II	2023	Map shared between the FC modules
IL-2 Sturmovik: Flying Circus - Volume III	2023	Map shared between the FC modules
IL-2 Sturmovik: Flying Circus - Volume IV	2024	Map shared between the FC modules

==== Other ====
Title	Year	Comments
IL-2 Sturmovik: Tank Crew	2019	Map can also be used for flight

== Original IL-2 Sturmovik series ==
The original IL-2 Sturmovik series, from IL-2 Sturmovik (2001) to IL-2 Sturmovik: Birds of Prey (2009), features a number of games using the same engine, but featuring different battlefields and aircraft:

=== IL-2 Sturmovik ===
IL-2 Sturmovik came out in 2001, featuring 31 flyable aircraft and focusing on the Eastern Front.

=== IL-2 Sturmovik: Forgotten Battles ===
The first sequel Forgotten Battles was released in March 2003. In addition to the content from the original game, it added a number of simulated planes and battlefields and introduced the Continuation War theater..IL-2 Sturmovik: Forgotten Battles was a payable product that did not require the original 2001 game to be installed. A relevant new feature in Forgotten Battles was the campaign system that for the first time in the IL-2 Sturmovik games started the dynamic mode.

==== IL-2 Sturmovik: Forgotten Battles - Ace Expansion Pack ====
The Forgotten Battles Ace Expansion Pack was released in March 2004, adding 20 new modelled aircraft, 10 of them flyable by the player and with three new maps battlefields (Ardennes, Normandy, Pacific). Not a standalone game, the Ace Expansion Pack was a payable product which required that Forgotten Battles was previously installed.

==== IL-2 Sturmovik: Forgotten Battles - Gold Pack ====
The Gold Pack was simultaneously released with the Ace Expansion Pack. The Gold Pack reunited Forgotten Battles and Forgotten Battles - Ace Expansion Pack in one single standalone installation game. It was intended to purchasers who never before have bought any game in the IL-2 Sturmovik series.

=== Pacific Fighters ===
Released as a stand-alone expansion pack in October 2004, Pacific Fighters focuses on the Pacific theater, with theater-appropriate aircraft, as well as aircraft carriers and battleships.

=== Pe-2 Peshka ===
In May 2006, the Pe-2 Peshka (domestically known as Истории пикирующего бомбардировщика, "Stories of a dive bomber") add-on was released in Europe and North America. This added 95 campaigns, five single missions and five multi-player cooperative missions. Two new flyable aircraft, the Petlyakov Pe-2 (four variants) and the Petlyakov Pe-3 (two variants), as well as a large number of new ground vehicles and artillery were also included. When installed, Pe-2 Peshka is merged with previous games in the series. Pe-2 Peshka was a payable and downloadable patch, mainly intended to players who had accumulated all previous add-ons and patches of the series.

=== Sturmoviks over Manchuria ===
Sturmoviks over Manchuria was a downloadable add-on, mainly focusing on the Manchuria region and the border between the USSR, China and Japanese-occupied Korea. With this new add-on the player could fly aircraft related to the conflicts that broke out in this region at the end of the Second World War. Sturmoviks over Manchuria was a payable and downloadable patch, mainly intended to players who had accumulated all previous add-ons and patches of the series.

=== IL-2 Sturmovik: 1946 ===
Ubisoft released simultaneously both the IL-2 Sturmovik: 1946 add-on (DLC) and the IL-2 Sturmovik: 1946 compilation pack (in stores) in December 2006 in Europe and Australia; North American release was on 13 March 2007. The standalone compilation DVD takes its title from the add-on. In addition to all of the above games, the compilation includes the three new add-ons released in 2006: Pe-2 Peshka (released in May, see above) and the two add-ons newly included in the package: Sturmoviks over Manchuria and 1946. This raised the total number of aircraft to over 300 with 32 new flyable aircraft, such as Soviet and Japanese aircraft that served during the Soviet invasion of Manchuria in 1945. Referring to a purely hypothetical continuation of World War II in 1946, the 1946 add-on introduced a few aircraft which in real history never went beyond the design stage (the Heinkel Lerche and the Focke-Wulf Ta 183, for example). Among others, the IL-2 Sturmovik: 1946 compilation pack introduced the historically existing Yak-15, MiG-9, MiG-13, Ar-234, N1K-J, J2M, Ki-21, A-20C, Il-10 and many others. It also features nearly 200 new missions and new maps featuring the Kiev region, new parts of the USSR, Manchuria, China, Korea and Burma.

=== IL-2 Sturmovik: Birds of Prey ===
Birds of Prey is an IL-2 port created by Gaijin Entertainment. It was released in September 2009 for PlayStation Portable, Nintendo DS, as well as the PlayStation 3 and Xbox 360. In December 2009, the game was made available for Microsoft Windows under the title Wings of Prey.

== IL-2 Sturmovik: Cliffs of Dover ==
In March 2011, 1C released a sequel to the original IL-2 series (although running its own game engine) under the title IL-2 Sturmovik: Cliffs of Dover. In November 2017 an improved version of the game with the name of Cliffs of Dover – Blitz was developed by Team Fusion Simulations with permission by 1C Company. In August 2020 Team Fusion Simulations released the first Blitz add-on, Desert Wings – Tobruk, set in the skies of North Africa during the Western Desert campaign from 1940 to 1943.

== IL-2 Sturmovik: Great Battles ==
The original logo of IL-2 Sturmovik: Battle of Stalingrad as it was in 2013, before the IL-2 Sturmovik: Great Battles brand was coined in 2017

In December 2012, it was announced that 1C Company had combined with 777 Studios to form 1C Game Studios (1c-777 Limited). In November 2013 the team released another sequel in the series, titled IL-2 Sturmovik: Battle of Stalingrad, this time running the "Digital Nature" game engine (created in 2009 for Rise of Flight). After Battle of Stalingrad underwent a series of improvements between 2013 and 2016, its game engine saw its name changed from "Digital Nature" to "Digital Warfare" in November 2017. 1C Game Studios ended up releasing new theatres of operations, distinct from the Stalingrad area, the first being IL-2 Sturmovik: Battle of Moscow, released in 2016. In November 2017, when announcing the change of name of the game engine, 1C Game Studios also announced that all subsequent products would be a part of the newly named IL-2 Sturmovik: Great Battles brand, a series of simulations not only dealing with World War II aircraft as it also allows players to purchase a World War I aircraft simulator game (Flying Circus) or an add-on intended to operate World War II tanks (Tank Crew).

All of the IL-2 Sturmovik: Great Battles games are standalone games and it is not necessary to purchase and install any of the other games in the series.

=== IL-2 Sturmovik: Battle of Stalingrad ===
The first game in the new series, released in early access in 2013. The full-content version of IL-2 Sturmovik: Battle of Stalingrad was not released until 2014.

=== IL-2 Sturmovik: Battle of Moscow ===
IL-2 Sturmovik: Battle of Moscow was released in 2016

=== IL-2 Sturmovik: Battle of Kuban ===
In September 2016 development of IL-2 Sturmovik: Battle of Kuban was announced in the official forums. IL-2 Sturmovik: Battle of Kuban was released on 14 March 2018 through the official website and on 13 July 2018 through Steam.

=== IL-2 Sturmovik: Battle of Bodenplatte ===
IL-2 Sturmovik: Battle of Bodenplatte was released in October 2019. The pack includes aircraft that were operated by the USAAF, Royal Air Force and Luftwaffe during Operation Bodenplatte, the last and final large-scale offensive by the Luftwaffe in the closing stages of World War II.

=== IL-2 Sturmovik: Battle of Normandy ===
IL-2 Sturmovik: Battle of Normandy was announced in November 2019 and released on September 7, 2022. This installment focuses on the late war aerial engagements between the USAAF, Royal Air Force and the Luftwaffe in the skies over the Normandy and Calais regions of France before and after the Battle of Normandy.

=== IL-2 Sturmovik: Odessa and Leningrad - Siege and Liberation ===
The Odessa and Leningrad module is based on two maps that are created by volunteer teams. This is the only module that features two maps. 1CGS is assisting these teams with the map, as well as with planes for the module.

The module was released in early access in 2025 with only the Odessa map and two planes. The other map and more planes will be released later.

=== IL-2 Sturmovik: Flying Circus ===
A collection of 4 modules for the Great War that share the same map. Owning all modules allows for a career that spans much of the first World War. The first volume of IL-2 Sturmovik: Flying Circus was released in November 2019.

The planes in this collection are derived from those released for Rise of Flight.

=== IL-2 Sturmovik: Tank Crew ===
IL-2 Sturmovik: Tank Crew was fully released in December 2020. This is the first game in the entire IL-2 Sturmovik series that is not intended to fly aircraft: the pack allows players to seat inside WWII tanks and operate them in the very same simulated environment that is played by users who operate the usual WWII aircraft.
