= FlightSimCon =

Defunct aviation and flight simulation conference

- Status: Defunct
- Genre: Aviation, aviation safety, flight simulation, hobby
- Venue: Hyatt Regency Dallas, Dallas, TX
- Locations: Dallas, Texas (2018); Windsor Locks, Connecticut Bradley International Airport (2014-2017); Hartford, Connecticut (2013)
- Country: United States
- Inaugurated: March 2013
- Attendance: >1000 (2017)
- Website: http://www.flightsimcon.com/ (Defunct)

FlightSimCon was an annual aviation and flight simulation conference held on the grounds of Connecticut's Bradley International Airport. Until 2016, the event was held at the nearby New England Air Museum. The event grew in size every year since its inception, from about 40 attendees in 2013 to over 320 in 2015. FlightSimCon 2016 was the fourth annual FlightSimCon event, and was held June 11–12, 2016, at the New England Air Museum. FlightSimCon 2016 saw over 520 people attend the event.

In 2019, FlightSimCon held an online-only conference that claimed to focus specifically on "greed in flight simulation".

No conference was held in 2020. The event's website has been removed and Twitter account has been removed from public viewing, making the event effectively defunct.

== History ==
Vendors at FlightSimCon 2015

The first FlightSimCon was held in March 2013 in downtown Hartford. For FlightSimCon 2014, the event moved north of Hartford to the New England Air Museum in Windsor Locks, Connecticut, where the event was again held in June 2015.

The event had a strong focus on flight simulation, specifically Microsoft Flight Simulator X and X-Plane

Notable speakers have included PMDG's Robert Randazzo and X-Plane's Austin Meyer.

The conference has drawn the attention of aviation universities like Embry-Riddle Aeronautical University and Vaughn College of Aeronautics and Technology, both exhibiting at the 2017 event.
