= Microsoft Flight Simulator 2004: A Century of Flight =

2003 video game

- Developer: ACES
- Publisher: Microsoft Game Studios
- Series: Microsoft Flight Simulator
- Platform: Windows
- Release: NA: July 29, 2003; EU: August 1, 2003; AU: August 11, 2003
- Genre: Flight simulation
- Modes: Single-player, multiplayer

Microsoft Flight Simulator 2004: A Century of Flight is a flight simulation video game released in 2003, and is part of the Microsoft Flight Simulator video game series. It is the last version to support Windows 98/9x series of operating systems.

== Gameplay ==
Flight simulation cockpit view of an old style Boeing 707-320. For FS9 many free or inexpensive add-ons are available. Even more complex ones, this B707 includes five 2D operatable cockpit panels. This view is "Left seat" only.

Flight Simulator 2004 (9.0): A Century of Flight, also known as FS9 or FS2004, was shipped with several historical aircraft such as the Wright Flyer, Ford Tri-Motor, and the Douglas DC-3 to commemorate the 100th anniversary of the Wright Brothers' first flight. The game includes a total of 24 aircraft. The program included an improved weather engine, that provided true three-dimensional clouds and true localized weather conditions for the first time. The engine also allowed users to download weather information from actual weather stations, allowing the simulator to synchronize the weather with the real world. Other enhancements from the previous version included better ATC communications, GPS equipment, interactive virtual cockpits, and more variety in autogen such as barns, street lights, silos, etc.

A service update (9.1) was released on 10 June 2004, that included over 160 bridges missing or wrongly displayed in the original version, with several other corrections and performance improvements.

Precision Manuals Development Group has created several expansion aircraft for Flight Simulator 2004. A set of two third-party add-ons were released in 2004 and 2006, titled Wings of Power.

== Reception ==
=== Sales ===
According to The NPD Group, Flight Simulator 2004 was the 14th-best-selling computer game of 2003. It claimed 18th and 17th places on NPD's annual computer game sales charts for 2004 and 2005, respectively. Flight Simulator 2004 sold 670,000 copies and earned $26.8 million in the United States alone by August 2006. At the time, this led Edge to declare it the country's 19th-best-selling computer game, and best-selling Microsoft Flight Simulator title, released since January 2000. The game also received a "Silver" sales award from the Entertainment and Leisure Software Publishers Association (ELSPA), indicating sales of at least 100,000 copies in the United Kingdom.

All entries in the Microsoft Flight Simulator series released in the 2000s, including Flight Simulator 2004, reached combined sales of 3.1 million units in the United States by August 2006.

=== Critical reviews ===
The editors of Computer Gaming World presented Flight Simulator 2004 with their 2003 "Flight Simulation of the Year" award. They wrote, "All the details fall together in FS2004: A Century of Flight, the first release in this venerable series that convincingly re-creates the entire flying experience." It was also a nominee for PC Gamer US's 2003 "Best Simulation" award, although it lost to IL-2 Sturmovik: Forgotten Battles. The editors called Flight Simulator 2004 "the best-looking and highest-flying collection of vintage and modern aircraft in this storied series".

During the 7th Annual Interactive Achievement Awards, the Academy of Interactive Arts & Sciences nominated Microsoft Flight Simulator 2004 for Computer Simulation Game of the Year.
