= Flight simulation video game =

Video game genre

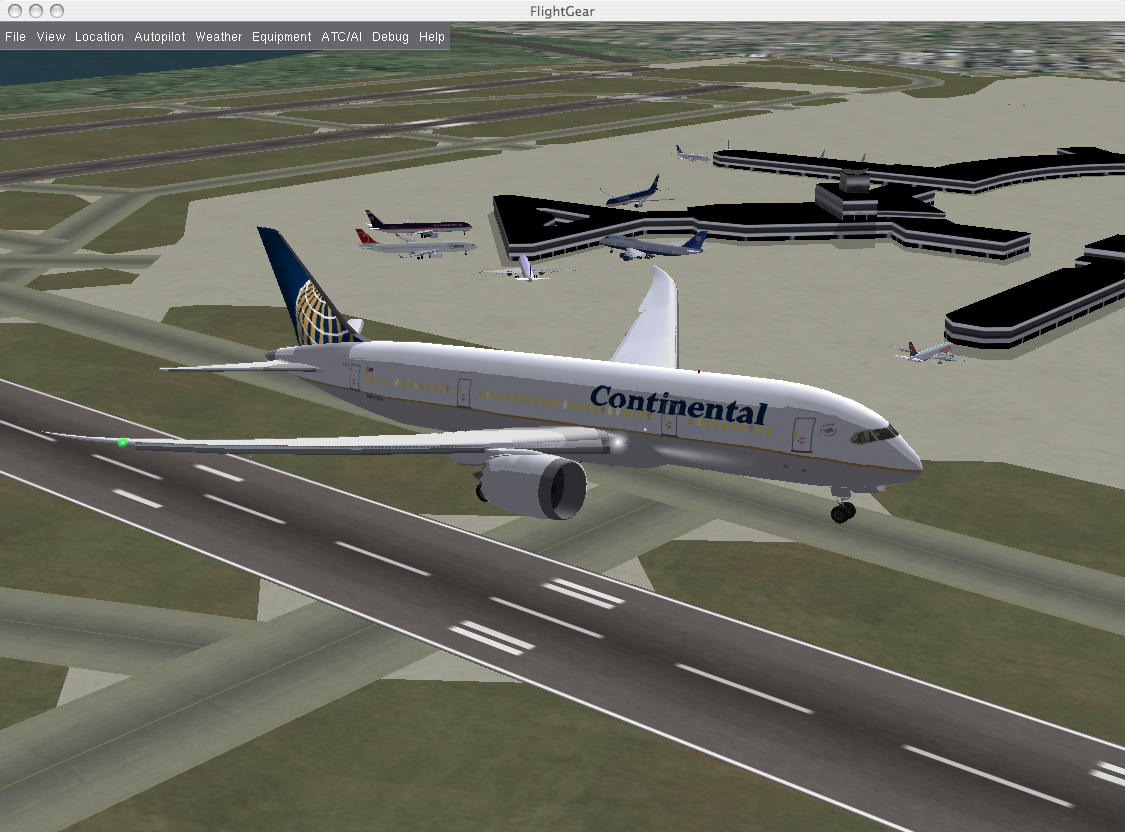
Screenshot from the FlightGear simulator

A flight simulation video game refers to the simulation of various aspects of flight or the flight environment for purposes other than flight training or aircraft development. A significant community of simulation enthusiasts is supported by several commercial software packages, as well as commercial and homebuilt hardware. Open-source software that is used by the aerospace industry like FlightGear, whose flight dynamics engine (JSBSim) is used in a 2015 NASA benchmark to judge new simulation code to space industry standards, is also available for private use. A popular type of flight simulators video games are combat flight simulators, which simulate combat air operations from the pilot and crew's point of view. Combat flight simulation titles are more numerous than civilian flight simulators due to variety of subject matter available and market demand.

== History and use ==
=== Arcades (1970s–1990s) ===
Prior to the rise of video games, Sega produced Jet Rocket (1970), a first-person arcade combat flight simulator electro-mechanical game (EM game) featuring cockpit controls that could move the player aircraft around a landscape displayed on a screen and shoot missiles onto targets that explode when hit. The game displayed three-dimensional terrain with buildings, produced using special belt technology along with fluorescent paint to simulate a night view. Upon its debut, the game was cloned by three arcade manufacturers. Sega's last EM flight simulator was Heli-Shooter (1977), which combines the use of a CPU processor with electro-mechanical components, screen projection and audio tape deck. The gameplay involves the player piloting a helicopter using a throttle joystick (to accelerate and decelerate) and pedals (to maneuver left and right) across a realistic three-dimensional landscape and shooting at military targets across the landscape.

Combat flight simulator video games began appearing in arcades from the late 1970s. In 1975, Taito released a simulator video game in arcades, Interceptor, which was a crude arcade first-person combat flight simulator that involved using an eight-way joystick to aim with a crosshair and shoot at enemy aircraft that move in formations of two and scale in size depending on their distance to the player.

In the late 1980s, it became a trend for arcade flight combat simulators to use hydraulic motion simulator arcade cabinets. The trend was sparked by Sega's "taikan" games, with "taikan" meaning "body sensation" in Japanese. Yu Suzuki's team at Sega (later known as Sega AM2) developed hydraulic motion simulator cockpit cabinets for flight combat games such as Space Harrier (1985), After Burner (1987) and the R360 games.

Arcade flight simulator games began adopting 3D polygon graphics in the late 1980s, with titles such as Taito's Top Landing (1988). Taito's Midnight Landing (1987) and Top Landing did not have air combat, but instead simulated a commercial airliner, while utilizing motion simulator cockpit cabinets. Arcade flight combat simulators later began adopting 3D polygons with Taito's Air Inferno (1990) and Steel Talons (1991) by Atari Games.

=== Personal computers (1980s–present) ===
Flight simulators were among the first types of programs to be developed for early personal computers and began adopting 3D polygon graphics in the early 1990s, with titles such as Stunt Island (1992), Star Wars: X-Wing (1993), and Strike Commander (1993). The game world in flight simulators is often based on the real world. However, they are often confined to one part of the game world by invisible boundaries. In some games, the aircraft simply halts in midair, while other games force the player to turn around. However, many games solve this boundary problem by wrapping the game world as a sphere.

Although these games strive for a great deal of realism, they often simplify or abstract certain elements to reach a wider audience. Many modern fighter aircraft have hundreds of controls, and flight simulator games usually simplify these controls drastically. Further, certain maneuvers can knock a pilot unconscious or rip their aircraft apart, but games do not always implement these concerns.

In the early 2000s, even home entertainment flight simulators had become so realistic that after the events of September 11, 2001, some journalists and experts speculated that the hijackers might have gained enough knowledge to steer a passenger airliner from packages such as Microsoft Flight Simulator. Microsoft, while rebutting such criticisms, delayed the release of the 2002 version of its hallmark simulator to remove the World Trade Center from its New York City scenery and even supplied a patch to delete the towers retroactively from earlier versions of the sim.

The advent of flight simulators as home video game entertainment has prompted many users to become "airplane designers" for these systems. As such, they may create both military or commercial airline airplanes, and they may even use names of real life airlines, as long as they do not make profits out of their designs. Many other home flight simulator users create fictional airlines, or virtual versions of real-world airlines, so called virtual airlines. These modifications to a simulation generally add to the simulation's realism and often grant a significantly expanded playing experience, with new situations and content. In some cases, a simulation is taken much further in regards to its features than was envisioned or intended by its original developers. Falcon 4.0 is an example of such modification; "modders" have created whole new warzones, along with the ability to fly hundreds of different aircraft, as opposed to the single original flyable airframe.

One way that users of flight simulation software engage is through the internet. Virtual pilots and virtual air traffic controllers take part in an online flying experience which attempts to simulate real-world aviation to a high degree. There are four networks where this sort of play is possible, the most popular ones being VATSIM and IVAO. The virtual airspace provided by both organizations provides users a low barrier of entry. This allows any member, regardless of skill, the ability to fly without worrying if something goes wrong. The provided airspace on both networks covers the entire globe, VATSIM is generally regarded to have better coverage of North America, Europe, and Australia, while at IVAO pilots and controllers generally fly and control in Africa and South America, in addition to Europe. Both networks receive 600 to 900 ATC and pilot connections daily.

=== Video game consoles (1990s–present) ===
Much rarer but still notable are flight simulators available for various game consoles. Successful examples of these are the Pilotwings series by Nintendo and the Ace Combat series by Namco. While generally not as complex as PC based simulators, console flight simulators can still be enjoyable to play, though their 'simulation' status is disputed by many in the flight simulation community. In 2020, Microsoft released Microsoft Flight Simulator 2020 to Xbox consoles, increasing the presence of flight simulators on console devices.

== Homebuilt cockpits ==
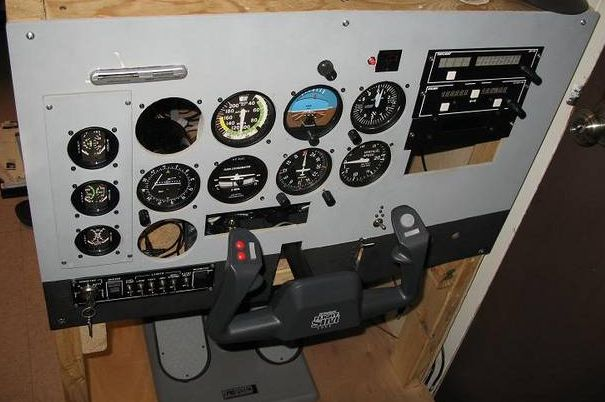
A homebuilt simulator

Often referred to as Simpits, home cockpit building is a common hobby among simulator pilots. Simpits range in complexity from a single computer, with some effort to create a permanent area for simulation, through to complete cockpit reconstruction projects utilizing multiple systems. The growth in home cockpit complexity and realism has been further fueled by the opening up of the simulation software packages with published SDKs (Software Development Kits) now common.

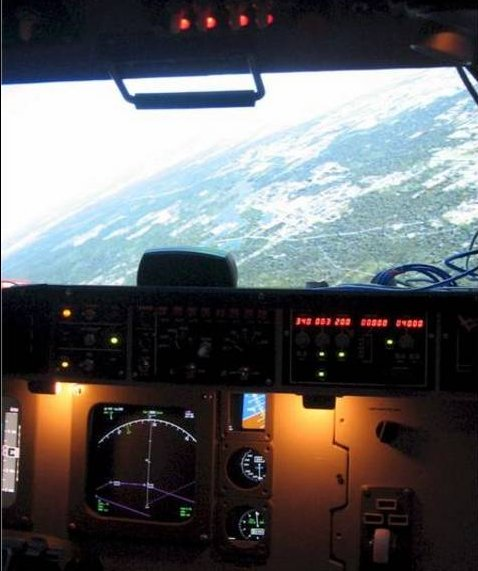
A homebuilt Boeing style simulator utilizing generic hardware

The push for higher realism in desktop simulation, often fueled by real pilots looking to practice cheaply at home, has led to a wide array of suppliers growing up to satisfy the demand. Hardware is available from a variety of commercial sources ranging from yokes, throttles and pedals, through to radios, lights and complete instruments. This home use hardware is rarely certified for flight training, so the hours spent practicing in the simpit will not count towards a pilot's hours. However it is widely utilized as an unofficial training aid, allowing realistic procedures practice, as well as the opportunity to complete visual or IMC approaches prior to a real world flight. This can help make a pilot's real-world flight time safer and more productive. Professional opinion is divided about how effective this home simulation can be against real world flight, and this has been a subject of debate in popular flying magazines such as 'Pilot' through 2007.

For those wishing more than a desktop simulator, replica panels are commercially available mimicking those found in a modern airliners such as a Boeing or Airbus. These panels will either fit into a real cockpit section, which some large scale home simulators are built into, or will be mounted in a home constructed cockpit frame, normally made from wood. With most modern airliners now using Glass Cockpit type displays it is relatively simple to replicate the displays in software, outputting them via multi head graphics cards or networked PCs to cheaply available LCD monitors mounted behind the panel. To the casual observer it can be hard to tell a homebuilt static simulator and a commercial one apart.

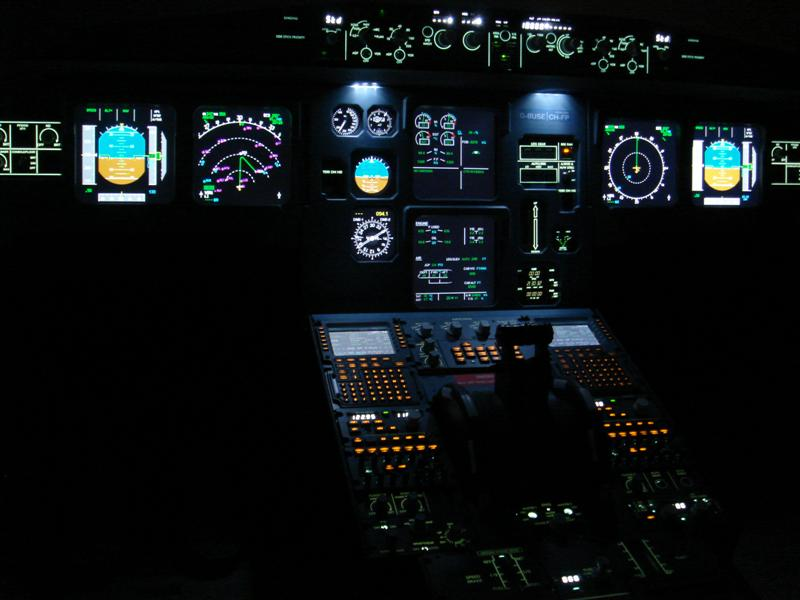
A homebuilt Airbus simulator cockpit

Where commercial panels or controls do not exist, simulator builders will often create their own out of wood or similar easily worked materials. Another common route for sourcing the specific hardware needed in a simulator, and one used by the commercial sector as well, is to obtain a real component from a scrapyard and convert it for PC input. Interface hardware for these home-made controls is directly available from commercial suppliers, or can be obtained by dismantling cheap joysticks or similar components and rewiring them. Some home builds will even incorporate motion platforms, although unlike commercial simulators these are normally more limited in motion, and often rely on electrical motors as opposed to hydraulics.

Beyond the hardware of home cockpits, most flight simulator software can simulate modern aircraft systems to a very high standard in addition to the basic flight dynamics, providing accurate recreations of, among others, the FMC (Flight Management Computer), autopilot and engine management systems. With additional hardware and add-in software this may be extended further, for example into a fully functional overhead panel requiring real-world check lists to be followed for engine start-up and flight with a full flight deck crew.

== Space flight simulators ==
Delta-Glider, a fictional vessel in Orbiter

As space is a natural extension of airspace, space flight simulators may be treated as an extension of flight simulators' genre. There is a considerable interdependence between those two kinds of simulators, as some flight simulators feature spacecraft as an extension and some space flight simulators may feature realistic atmospheric flight simulation engines. For instance, in 2013 a hobbyist space flight simulator project was realized under usage of Pioneer simulation software.

== Home software ==
Flight simulator software is largely on PC, however mobile flight simulators are also increasingly popular, with Infinite Flight, X-Plane Mobile competing with the PC simulators.

Some PC flight simulators can use mobile devices or additional PCs as additional interfaces for display and control, including the touch interfaces on smartphones. Existing mapping applications can be set to interface with PC flight simulators like X-Plane or FlightGear to create a moving map. FlightGear can recreate map interfaces, instrument panels or control interfaces on any mobile device that supports a browser or through a dedicated mobile application.

=== Flight and space flight simulators ===
- FlightGear is a free and open-source flight simulator that also simulates space flight in Earth's orbit, and is actively maintained by a large user community. FlightGear is used professionally in Aerospace engineering and research, with a flight dynamics engine (JSBSim) that is used in a 2015 NASA benchmark to judge new simulation code to the standards of the space industry, but is freely available. The FlightGear project receives development from people with scientific and engineering backgrounds, and is open to contributions from any source due to its nature. With regards to space flight, FlightGear can accurately handle speeds from transonic to high hypersonic or re-entry regimes with a flight dynamics engine that can incorporate windtunnel data or computational fluid dynamics, and uses a 3D model of gravity used for spaceflight based on spherical harmonics which can simulate the twisting force caused by gravity varying over a craft. Of particular note is FlightGear's Space Shuttle project, whose simulation is backed by NASA windtunnel data and is the most detailed and accurate simulation outside of NASA's internal ones. FlightGear also runs on Raspberry Pi from Pi 4 onwards through a special stripped-down version.
- Microsoft Flight Simulator series, Microsoft Flight Simulator X includes space as an area to be discovered, with a payware Space Shuttle add-on also being available. The series' latest installment, Microsoft Flight Simulator 2024, was released on November 19, 2024.
- X-Plane, a realistic simulator developed by Laminar Research since 1993 which also includes a Space Shuttle and in older versions, Mars flight simulators. Twelve iterations of the simulator has been released so far, with the most recent being X-Plane 12 in late 2022.
- Kerbal Space Program, spacecraft and aircraft construction and flight simulator; initially space-focused, but the addition of air-breathing engines and lift surfaces made atmospheric flight practical. The simulation is of a fictitious world and not based on the real world or solar system, and the idea is more to preserve some of the concepts of space flight while allowing entertaining gameplay.

=== Flight simulators ===
- War Thunder, a massively multiplayer online military game based around combined arms battles on air, land, and sea.
- Digital Combat Simulator (DCS), a highly realistic simulator focused on study-level simulations of payware military aircraft.
- ELITE: Electronic IFR Training Environment, a professional flight simulator with focus in IFR training
- Lockheed Martin Prepar3D (P3D), an offshoot of the Microsoft Flight Simulator series built on the engine used in FSX licensed to Lockheed Martin, however Lockheed Martin only obtained the license for professional and academic use, so use for personal or consumer entertainment is not allowed. Despite this, Lockheed Martin does not verify a customer's compliance with the EULA upon purchase of the product and Prepar3D is openly used and supported in official forums for home flight simulator use.
- IL-2 Sturmovik series, a World War II combat flight simulator
- Rise of Flight: The First Great Air War, a World War I combat flight simulator
- Take on Helicopters, a helicopter simulator developed in 2011 by Bohemia Interactive
- Hangsim, a flight simulator that simulates hang gliding or paragliding

=== Space flight simulators ===
- Orbiter, an opensource space flight simulator, also features many types of historical and fictional add-ons
- Microsoft Space Simulator
- Space Shuttle Mission 2007, includes several missions flown by space shuttle

=== Smartphone and Web browser flight simulators ===
- GeoFS, a browser and phone based multi-player free flight simulator that is built on CesiumJS
- Infinite Flight, a flight simulator for iOS, and Android.
- RFS - Real Flight Simulator, a flight simulator for iOS, and Android
- X-Plane Mobile, a port of the PC simulator of the same name
- Flight World Simulator, a flight simulator for iOS, and Android that is built on Unity
- Turboprop Flight Simulator, a flight simulator for iOS, and Android that is built on Unity

=== Arcade-style ===
==== Non-combat ====
- AeroWings (Dreamcast, PlayStation)
- Bravo Air Race (PlayStation)
- Pilotwings series (Super NES, Nintendo 64, Nintendo 3DS)
- SimCopter (Windows)
- Sky Odyssey (PlayStation 2)
- Wing Island (Wii)

==== Combat racing ====
- MySims SkyHeroes (Nintendo DS, PlayStation 3, Wii, Xbox 360)
- NGEN Racing (PlayStation)
- Plane Crazy (PlayStation, Windows)
- SkyDrift (PlayStation 3, Xbox 360, Xbox One, Windows)
- Slipstream 5000 (MS-DOS, Windows)

==== Combat ====
- Ace Combat (PlayStation, Xbox one)
- AeroWings 2: Airstrike (Dreamcast)
- Master of the Skies: The Red Ace (Windows)
- Red Ace Squadron (Windows)

== See also ==
- Combat flight simulation game
- International Virtual Aviation Organisation
