= Pacific Fighters =

2004 video game

- Developer: 1C:Maddox Games
- Publishers: 1C Company, Ubisoft
- Designer: Oleg Maddox
- Platform: Microsoft Windows
- Release: EU: October 21, 2004; NA: October 26, 2004
- Genre: Combat flight simulation game
- Modes: Single-player, Multiplayer

Pacific Fighters, known in Russia as Pearl Harbor (Перл-Харбор), is a World War II Combat flight simulation game for Microsoft Windows, developed in Russia by 1C:Maddox Games and distributed by Ubisoft in 2004. It is in fact a stand-alone expansion pack of IL-2 Sturmovik, released three years earlier in 2001, also developed by 1C:Maddox Games and distributed by Ubisoft. The latest version corresponds to the IL-2 Sturmovik: 1946 compilation, distributed by Ubisoft in 2006.

Pacific Fighters is played online by gamers (Online fighter squadron communities) using a standard IP address or a client server such as Hyperlobby regularly but can be flown offline as well. The game gives the player 74 flyable aircraft, including variants. It was created by Maddox Games, as a Pacific War expansion of IL-2 Sturmovik: Forgotten Battles, although it can also be installed as a stand-alone game. It has two types of missions that can be flown, "dogfights" or "cooperative campaign" modes. In either type, the player can play as either Allied or Axis forces, and the type of aircraft flown usually depends on the mission picked. The game also features a mission editor, allowing the player to make their own missions.

== Reception ==
Reception

Aggregate scores
Aggregator	Score
GameRankings	78.35%
Metacritic	76/100

Review scores
Publication	Score
1Up.com	B−
GamePro	3.5/5
GameSpot	7.3/10
GameSpy	3.5/5
GameZone	9/10
IGN	7.7/10
PC Format	83%
PC Gamer (UK)	86%
PC Gamer (US)	88%
PC Zone	74%
The Sydney Morning Herald	3.5/5

Pacific Fighters was met with positive reception upon release, as GameRankings gave it a score of 78.35%, while Metacritic gave it 76 out of 100.

During the 8th Annual Interactive Achievement Awards, the Academy of Interactive Arts & Sciences nominated Pacific Fighters for "Simulation Game of the Year", which was ultimately awarded to The Sims 2.
