= Pilotwings 64 =

1996 Nintendo 64 video game

- North American box art
- Developers: Nintendo EAD; Nintendo R&D3; Paradigm Simulation
- Publisher: Nintendo
- Director: Makoto Wada
- Producers: Genyo Takeda; Shigeru Miyamoto
- Designer: Makoto Wada
- Artists: Yoshiyuki Kato; Hiroaki Takenaka
- Composer: Dan Hess
- Series: Pilotwings
- Platform: Nintendo 64
- Release: JP: June 23, 1996; NA: September 29, 1996; PAL: March 1, 1997
- Genre: Flight simulation
- Mode: Single-player

Pilotwings 64 (Note: Japanese: パイロットウイングス64, Hepburn: Pairottouingusu Rokujūyon) is a 1996 flight simulation video game developed by Nintendo and Paradigm Simulation and published by Nintendo for the Nintendo 64. It was one of three launch titles for the Nintendo 64 in Japan as well as Europe and one of two launch titles in North America, along with Super Mario 64. Pilotwings 64 is a sequel to Pilotwings for the Super Nintendo Entertainment System, which was a North American launch game for its respective console in 1991. Also like that game, Pilotwings 64 received production input from Nintendo producer and EAD General Manager Shigeru Miyamoto.

Pilotwings 64 puts the player in control of one of six pilots as they try to earn pilot licenses through various forms of aviation. The events are flying an autogyro, using a jet pack, and hang gliding. Several bonus tasks are offered, such as skydiving and a human cannonball test. The game also puts focus on allowing the player to freely explore its detailed 3D environments, most notably a miniature representation of the United States.

The game received positive review scores and praise from gaming publications and news sources alike for its visual presentation and flying controls. Similar to its SNES predecessor, Pilotwings 64 serves to demonstrate the graphical capabilities of its gaming hardware. Although the flight simulator did not enjoy the same commercial success as its fellow launch game Super Mario 64, Pilotwings 64 nonetheless went on to sell over one million copies worldwide. The game received its first official re-release on the Nintendo Classics service on October 13, 2022.

== Gameplay ==
Piloting the hang glider, the player navigates a series of descending rings along a river.

Pilotwings 64 is a flight simulator in which the player must complete a variety of missions involving different airborne vehicles and air sports. Before each mission, the player must choose one of six character pilots, each with their own advantages and disadvantages based on factors such as weight. Tests before each event require the player to complete an objective in order to earn a license for the event. Depending on the mission, points are awarded or deducted based on time, damage, fuel usage, accuracy, softness of landing, and similar criteria. The player is awarded a bronze, silver, or gold license based on the number of points attained. More difficult tests become available as the player progresses.

There are three main events in Pilotwings 64 required to complete the game, each of which has its own objectives and unique flight controls using the Nintendo 64 controller's single analog stick. The first event, hang gliding, usually requires the player to fly through a series of floating marker rings or snap a photograph of a particular piece of scenery before landing on a target area. The player's movement is affected by wind currents, and altitude can be gained by flying through thermal columns. The second event is the "Rocket Belt", a jet pack that allows the player to move and gain height as well as hover, tilt, and rotate in the air using the belt's equipped thrusters. Goals entail flying through rings, landing on floating platforms or popping large balloons before landing. The third event, the gyrocopter, challenges the player to take off and land on a runway after completing objectives like navigating a path of rings or destroying targets with missiles.

Pilotwings 64 also features several bonus events that are unlocked if the player performs well in the main missions. The player can also earn medals in many of these events. They include skydiving, a human cannonball event, and the "Jumble Hopper", which grants the player special spring-loaded boots use in bouncing across the landscape to an end space. Lastly, Pilotwings 64 features a "Birdman" mode that puts the character in a bird suit and gives players the opportunity to freely explore the game's detailed, object-dense environments set among its four distinct islands. One of the islands is based on the United States, and has geographical replications of famous landmarks including the Statue of Liberty and Mount Rushmore (with Mario's face replacing George Washington's) and major cities such as Los Angeles, Chicago, and New York City. Representations of Nintendo characters and many other quirks can be found in the landscapes of the game.

== Development ==
Pilotwings 64 was co-developed by the Texas-based graphics company Paradigm Simulation and Nintendo's Entertainment Analysis & Development (EAD) and Research and Development No. 3 (R&D3) divisions. Due to Paradigm's experience with Silicon Graphics workstations, Nintendo contacted the American company in 1994 concerning it becoming one of the Nintendo 64's "Dream Team" of first developers. Paradigm worked directly with a team at Silicon Graphics and spent nine months developing a technology base for Pilotwings 64 and Paradigm's other Nintendo 64 releases. Development on Pilotwings 64 began in earnest during June 1995, with Nintendo working on the game design and Paradigm working on the technical production. Nintendo's Genyo Takeda and Makoto Wada acted as Paradigm's primary technical and design contacts individually. Wada, the game's director, was also involved in design aspects such as modeling and animation. Shigeru Miyamoto, the producer of Pilotwings for the SNES, reprised his role for Pilotwings 64 and oversaw the project from Japan. Miyamoto's involvement was more removed than with the SNES game due to his simultaneous work on the platform game Super Mario 64.

It's difficult to explain, but the feeling of the flight simulation is very realistic. You can glide down from the top of a mountain, then turn around and look back up at the peak and say, "Hey, I was just up there." It's that real.

— Shigeru Miyamoto, June 1996

According to Miyamoto, Pilotwings 64 was designed to allow gamers to experience free flight in realistic 3D environments on the Nintendo 64. Prior to the game's conception, Paradigm had worked on military vehicle and flight simulators, but not video games. Dave Gatchel of Paradigm disclosed that with regard to creating the game, they began with a "physics-based approach", but deviated from this in order to gain a balance between accuracy and fun for players. He indicated that there was never an issue as to whether Pilotwings 64 should be more of an arcade game or a simulation, as their goal was to "always have a more arcade feel". The technical team studied the original Pilotwings extensively during development.

Pilotwings on the SNES makes use of the power of the 16-bit console, principally its Mode 7 capability. Similarly, Pilotwings 64 prominently demonstrates the graphical features of its own console. Gatchel suggested that just as design elements present in the game generated its production requirements, these same elements were influenced by the Nintendo 64's technology during development. The large islands within the game were created using Paradigm's own 3D development tool Vega UltraVision. Navigation of these environments is relatively smooth thanks to Pilotwings 64 taking advantage of several key Nintendo 64 hardware features. Conventional level of detail and mipmapping were used to reduce the computational load of distant landscape objects and terrains when they were rendered. The processes respectively substitute simpler geometrical shapes for more complex ones and less detailed textures for more detailed ones, lowering the polygon count and 3D rendering time for a given frame and thus putting less demand on the geometric engine. Pilotwings 64 also applies z-buffering, which keeps track of an object's depth and tells the graphics processor which portions of the object to render and which to hide. This, along with texture filtering and anti-aliasing, makes the object appear solid and smooth along its edges rather than pixelated.

As Nintendo was in charge of its actual game design, they dictated the aircraft and characters that would be present in the game. The six playable pilots in Pilotwings 64 are all named after various birds. The character Lark is modeled after Nester, a mascot for the North American Nintendo Power magazine. The female character Robin is called "Hooter" in the Japanese version.

The soundtrack for Pilotwings 64 was composed by Dan Hess. While Akito Nakatsuka is credited for "sound arrangement", Hess has stated that Nakatsuka did not participate in arranging the game's music despite his credit. The tracks were produced to complement each level, such as a "soothing" jazz-inspired musical piece played during the exploratory Birdman mode. Hess found it challenging to communicate with EAD, due to cultural differences and language barriers. After writing numerous tracks that were rejected, he asked the team to provide reference songs. A CD soundtrack was released by Pony Canyon in Japan on December 16, 1996.

Pilotwings 64 was one of thirteen Nintendo 64 games shown at Shoshinkai show in Tokyo in November 1995 when the console was first demonstrated to the public as the "Ultra 64". The game was later displayed at the Electronic Entertainment Expo (E3) in Los Angeles during May 1996.

== Reception and legacy ==
Reception

Aggregate scores
Aggregator	Score
GameRankings	87.52%
Metacritic	80/100 (13 reviews)

Review scores
Publication	Score
Computer and Video Games	9/10
Edge	9/10
Electronic Gaming Monthly	8.4/10
Famitsu	5/10, 8/10, 9/10, 7/10; 29/40
Game Informer	9.25/10
GameFan	95/100
GameRevolution	D+
GameSpot	8.9/10
Hyper	93%
IGN	8.2/10
N64 Magazine	89%
Next Generation	5/5
Nintendo Power	3.825/5
Total!	97/100
Maximum	5/5

Pilotwings 64 was released in Japan on June 23, 1996, as one of three Nintendo 64 launch titles, the other two being Super Mario 64 and Saikyō Habu Shōgi. Pilotwings 64 managed to sell about one unit with about every tenth Nintendo 64 console, with regional sales totaling 136,986 copies by the end of the year. The game was one of two original releases for the system during its September 26, 1996 debut in North America, which was a few days earlier than the date set by Nintendo. While Super Mario 64 initially sold at a one-to-one ratio with each console in the United States, Pilotwings 64 sold an average of one copy with every fourth console. Despite selling out, some store locations for Electronics Boutique and KB Toys reported few or no units of the flight simulator being shipped to retailers. About 90,000 copies of Pilotwings 64 were sold in its first few days on sale in the country, putting the game at number four on the NPD Group sales charts for that September. It went on to become the sixth best-selling Nintendo 64 game of 1996 in the United States. Pilotwings 64 saw a release in European nations on March 1, 1997, when it was one of three launch games along with Super Mario 64 and Star Wars: Shadows of the Empire. In the United Kingdom, it was listed by Esquire magazine as the "cheapest game in Nintendo's frighteningly-priced opening range of titles". It was confirmed in early 1998 that the game had sold over one million units worldwide.

Pilotwings 64 was well received by most reviewers. The game's combination of 3D graphics, realistic settings, and flight simulation were applauded by many news sources and major gaming publications. In his release review of the Nintendo 64, The Seattle Times contributor Steven L. Kent found that the flight mechanics and vast areas featured in Pilotwings 64 make it one of the most impressive games ever made. Glenn Rubenstein of the website GameSpot summarized, "The graphics, sound, control, and all around excitement add up to make Pilotwings 64 one hell of a great ride." Staff reviewers of Electronic Gaming Monthly, GamePro, and IGN all voiced positive comments on the game's polygon rendering and frame rates, as well as its sense of control and flying. Alex Constantides of Computer and Video Games enjoyed the game's large environments, exclaiming, "You'll not believe just how huge the islands really are and, because certain elements are hidden at first, it'll take you months to see everything." IGN's Levi Buchanan described this low-pressure, "challenge without competition" aspect of the game as a design philosophy adopted by later Nintendo titles such as Nintendogs. Rich Leadbetter of Maximum said that not everyone is appealed by its gameplay's "sedate nature", but agreed that PilotWings 64 involved high "skill, dexterity and control", and that "it is a game that you must own and whilst not quite in the same league of 'must-have'itude as Super Mario 64, it remains an astounding achievement and another triumph for Nintendo." A Next Generation critic remarked that once beyond the introductory missions the game becomes satisfyingly challenging, and succeeds as both a flight simulation and an example of Nintendo's surrealistic gameplay: "It's a weird mix of total realism and self-conscious videogame elements, and the two don't grate."

Pilotwings 64 has been criticized for lacking innovative gameplay. The New York Times writer Ashley Dunn characterized the game's E3 demonstration as "brain-dead" in its gameplay and suggested that even young children would rather fly a dragon on the Sony PlayStation. Game Revolution issued Pilotwings 64 a particularly harsh review score, declaring the game to be nothing more than a graphical showcase for those with nothing better to do. The sound effects present in the game were impressive to several reviewers, but the soundtrack has been negatively compared to lounge music and porn groove, although the "Birdman" track was highly rated.

Electronic Gaming Monthly awarded Pilotwings 64 Flying Game of the Year, explaining that it shows the potential of the fun factor of flying and allows for more than one path from point A to point B, and says that "fun, variety and easy-paced action gave PW64 this award."

Pilotwings 64 was ranked number 38 in Nintendo Power's "100 Best Nintendo Games of All Time" in its landmark 100th issue in September 1997. In February 2006, it was rated the 117th best game made on a Nintendo system in the magazine's "Top 200 Games" list for its 200th issue. In July 2007, the United Kingdom video game magazine Edge included Pilotwings 64 at number 69 on its own "Top 100 Games" list. The UK's Official Nintendo Magazine listed it at number 40 on its "100 Best Nintendo Games" in February 2009.

Paradigm announced at E3 1997 that they were producing a Nintendo 64 sequel to Pilotwings 64. However, even though Nintendo expressed interest in Paradigm's early presentations, the game was cancelled because Nintendo did not have the resources to aid in its development at that time. There were rumors of a sequel on the GameCube and later the Wii, development courtesy of Factor 5, but no game was ever shown. After their briefing time at E3 2010, Nintendo announced a sequel titled Pilotwings Resort for the Nintendo 3DS, which was released as a launch title for the handheld console.
