= IL-2 Sturmovik (video game) =

2001 video game

- Developer: 1C:Maddox Games
- Publishers: CIS: 1C; EU/NA: Ubi Soft
- Platform: Microsoft Windows
- Release: NA: November 20, 2001; PAL: November 30, 2001
- Genre: Combat flight simulator
- Modes: Single-player, multiplayer

IL-2 Sturmovik (Russian: Ил-2 Штурмовик) is a 2001 World War II combat flight simulator video game and is the first installment in the IL-2 Sturmovik series. The release focused on the air battles of the Eastern Front. It was named after the Soviet Ilyushin Il-2 ground-attack fighter, which played a prominent role in this theatre and is the single most produced military aircraft design to date. Along with its sequels, IL-2 Sturmovik is considered one of the leading World War II flight simulators.

== Gameplay ==
The game features 31 flyable planes and additional 40 non-flyable planes (available as opponents). One can play as Australia, France, Finland, Germany, Hungary, Italy, Japan, the Netherlands, New Zealand, Poland, Romania, Slovakia, the United Kingdom, the United States, and the USSR.

The game includes a multi-player feature which supports up to 100 players online over the internet. Free internet services such as Xfire, Hyperlobby, and The All-Seeing Eye, are used for setting up online game sessions.

== History ==
The game was developed by 1C:Maddox Games and published by 1C in Russia and Ubi Soft in the rest of the world, for Windows on November 18, 2001.

== Sequels and subsequent development ==
The game saw the release of a number of add-ons and sequels since its initial release, with some of the sequels including the entirety of the original release's content.

The game is currently distributed as the IL-2 Sturmovik: 1946 pack. The latest edition that includes all sequels and patches is version 4.14.1, which brings the number of available flyable aircraft up to 85* and the number of maps to 41*. IL-2 Sturmovik is the flight simulator video game longest supported by its developer with the demo released in 2001 and the latest patch including new planes, maps and other features released in December 2022. Recently patches 4.13, 4.13.1, 4.13.2, 4.13.3, 4.13.4, 4.14, 4.14.1, 4.15, and 4.15.1 were released.

All the patches or versions, like Forgotten Battles (2003) or standalone games, like Pacific Fighters (2004), used and shared the same game engine from 2001 until the 1946 pack (2006) and even until the console adaptation (IL-2 Sturmovik: Birds of Prey, 2009). The first games in the series not using the original 2001 game engine were IL-2 Sturmovik: Cliffs of Dover (2011, which runs its own game engine) and IL-2 Sturmovik: Battle of Stalingrad (2013, which runs on a game engine derived from another game, the 2009 simulator Rise of Flight).

== Reception ==
Reception

Aggregate scores
Aggregator	Score
GameRankings	90.65%
Metacritic	91/100

Review scores
Publication	Score
GameSpot	9.2/10
GameSpy	94%
IGN	8.3/10
PC Gamer (UK)	89%
PC Gamer (US)	90%
PC Zone	90%
The Cincinnati Enquirer	4/5

IL-2 Sturmovik received a "Silver" sales award from the Entertainment and Leisure Software Publishers Association (ELSPA), indicating sales of at least 100,000 copies in the United Kingdom. As of 2014, the game's overall sales had surpassed 2 million copies.

On the review aggregator Metacritic, IL-2 Sturmovik holds a score of 91 out of 100, while on GameRankings, another review aggregator, it holds 90.65%.

=== Awards ===
IL-2 Sturmovik was named the best computer simulation of 2001 by Computer Games Magazine, Computer Gaming World, The Electric Playground, GameSpy and GameSpot, and was a runner-up for IGN's award in this category, losing to Independence War 2. Similarly, the Academy of Interactive Arts & Sciences nominated IL-2 Sturmovik for its "PC Simulation" award, but ultimately gave the prize to Microsoft Flight Simulator 2002. It also "narrowly" lost PC Gamer US's "Best Simulation" award to Flight Simulator 2002, according to that magazine's editors.

While awarding the game, the editors of Computer Games called IL-2 Sturmovik "the best World War II flight sim—the best flight sim of any kind, for that matter—to come along in years." Similarly, those of Computer Gaming World wrote, "IL-2 Sturmovik's election to Sim of the Year was one of the biggest shoo-in votes in the history of this magazine. [...] Know this: Sturmovik is not only the best simulation of 2001, it's the best WWII-themed sim ever, and one of the best flight sims of all time."

=== Cultural references ===
2012 documentary film Wirtualna wojna shows the players of IL-2 Sturmovik.

== See also ==
- Combat Flight Simulator 3: Battle for Europe
- Jane's Attack Squadron
