= Pilotwings (video game) =

1990 video game

- North American cover art
- Developer: Nintendo EAD
- Publisher: Nintendo
- Director: Tadashi Sugiyama
- Producer: Shigeru Miyamoto
- Programmers: Shuhei Kato; Hajime Yajima; Takumi Kawagoe
- Artist: Naoki Mori
- Composers: Soyo Oka; Koji Kondo
- Series: Pilotwings
- Platform: Super Nintendo Entertainment System
- Release: JP: December 21, 1990; NA: August 23, 1991; EU: 1992
- Genre: Flight simulation
- Mode: Single-player

Pilotwings (Note: Japanese: パイロットウイングス, Hepburn: Pairottouingusu) is a flight simulation video game developed and published by Nintendo for the Super Nintendo Entertainment System. The game was originally released in Japan in December 1990, shortly after the launch of the Super Famicom in the country. It was also released as a launch title for the SNES in August 1991 in North America, with a European release following in 1992.

In Pilotwings, the player attempts to earn pilot licenses through lessons in light plane flight, hang gliding, skydiving, and the use of a rocket belt. Bonus stages and levels involving an attack helicopter are also available. Each event offers unique controls and gameplay mechanics. To increase the realism of the game's flight simulation, the developers extensively utilized the SNES's Mode 7 capability, which mimics 3D graphics by rotating and scaling flat objects.

The game was well-received upon its release, largely thanks to its graphical presentation. The game has since been re-released for the Wii and Wii U Virtual Console and the Nintendo Classics service in PAL regions, North America, and Japan, as well as New Nintendo 3DS in North America. A sequel, Pilotwings 64, was released for the Nintendo 64 in 1996. After many years of announcements and cancellations, Nintendo released a second sequel, Pilotwings Resort, in 2011 for the Nintendo 3DS.

== Gameplay ==
Pilotwings takes place at a flight club which is divided into four distinct training areas. The player's objective is to pass each training area and earn licenses based on the difficulty of the courses. Each area features 2—4 events, which may be played in any order. In each event, the player controls one of four aerial vehicles and must complete a task (usually flying through floating markers) then land safely and accurately within a time limit. Upon completing an event, the player earns points and receives comments from the instructors. Points are awarded based on criteria such as the time taken to complete the event, the accuracy of the landing, and the completion of the stated objective. To pass a training area and move to the next one, the combined scores from the events must exceed a specific threshold. Each training area can be replayed if necessary, and passwords allow players to save their progress.

The screenshot shows a pink hang glider in flight above an airstrip compound at sea. A dotted ring and a rising air thermal are visible in the background. The player's radar, altitude, and time are visible at the top of the image.

The four events are:

- Light plane: The player pilots a biplane through a course of orbs or rings, then lands and stops it on the runway.
- Skydiving: The player jumps from a helicopter at a high altitude and maneuvers by leaning forward and back, and by rotating on a horizontal axis. The player must fall through rings of orbs in the sky before deploying the parachute, and must then attempt to land in a target area made up of concentric circles.
- Jet pack: The player takes control of a rocket belt, which can be controlled with left and right yaw rotation, leaning forward and back to control speed. High and low levels of thrust allow high speed and finer control, respectively. The player must take off and fly through a series of rings, bars, or other objects before landing in a target area.
- Hang gliding: The player guides the hang glider to a series of thermal currents to reach a specified altitude, and then land as close as possible to the center of a gray square target.

Some events have bonus stages that add to a player's score, even if it has already reached the maximum number. In the skydiving, rocket belt, and hang glider modes, landing on moving platforms rewards players with a perfect score, and a bonus stage for extra points may be earned by falling into the water of a target area. These stages include maneuvering a diving penguin into a pool, bouncing a winged man across a series of trampolines, and flying another winged man as far as possible.

After completing the certification courses for all four training zones, the player is informed that an agent has infiltrated an enemy base ("EVIL Syndicate") on the fictional Izanu Island and has freed the player's kidnapped instructors, who are waiting to be rescued. The player must fly an attack helicopter from an offshore aircraft carrier and retrieve the captives by landing on a helipad on the island. As the player flies over the island, they must successfully dodge anti-aircraft fire from ground-based turrets which are able to shoot down the helicopter and end the game with a single hit. The helicopter has forward, backward, left, and right pitch controls, rotor throttle controls for altitude, and left and right missile firing controls. After completing the mission, the player earns the "Pilot's Wings" certificate and replay the training areas with inclement weather conditions and higher score requirements, followed by another nighttime helicopter mission. Clearing the second helicopter mission awards the player with the golden "Pilot's Wings", and completion of the game.

== Development ==
Pilotwings was developed by Nintendo Entertainment Analysis and Development (EAD), a team consisting of members of the company's Research & Development divisions, under the leadership of producer Shigeru Miyamoto. Nintendo EAD completed Pilotwings and two other games (Super Mario World and F-Zero) within 15 months of the debut of the Super Nintendo Entertainment System. Pilotwings was released in Japan on December 21, 1990, one month after the system's launch, and was later released in North America in August 1991 as a launch title. The game's musical score was composed by Soyo Oka, while her superior Koji Kondo was responsible for the sound programming and the helicopter theme. Six tracks from the game, including a rearranged version of the skydiving theme, appeared on the Nintendo Super Famicom Game Music album, released in Japan on March 4, 1992. Six piano-arranged versions of songs from the game were included on the Nintendo Super Famicom Game Music: Fun Together with Beyer CD, which was released in Japan on November 30, 1993.

A flight simulator game resembling Pilotwings called Dragonfly was shown during the official unveiling of the SNES to the Japanese press on November 21, 1988. The game was used to demonstrate the system's Mode 7 graphics system, which allows rotation, scaling, and other effects to be used on flat images to create a 3D effect. Because the game does not use the coprocessor chip Super FX, the true Super NES 3D technology, the buildings, runway, trees, and so on are all "painted" flat on the ground plane, and they appear to stick out of the ground when the player's viewpoint is far above.

== Reception and legacy ==
Reception

Aggregate score
Aggregator	Score
GameRankings	82% (SNES)

Review scores
Publication	Score
Electronic Gaming Monthly	7.75/10 (SNES)
Famitsu	8/10, 7/10, 8/10, 6/10 (SNES) 7/10, 8/10, 8/10, 7/10
Game Informer	8.25/10 (SNES)
GamePro	5/5 (SNES)
IGN	7.5/10 (Wii)
Mean Machines	90% (SNES)
Nintendo Life	7/10 (SNES)
Nintendo Power	3.8/5 (SNES)
Official Nintendo Magazine	90% (Wii)
SNES Force	91%
Super Play	92% (SNES)
Total!	91% (SNES)
Entertainment Weekly	B+

Pilotwings was positively received during both its initial release and in retrospective reviews. The game drew praise for its presentation, with publications describing its use of Mode 7 graphics as "stunning" and "jaw-dropping". Pilotwings was generally seen as a showpiece title for the Super NES, demonstrating its Mode 7 features, built-in sprite scaling, and high-end sound chip in a conspicuous manner. Its level of challenge was also positively noted; Mean Machines found that practicing the flight tests and reaching the end of the game was very rewarding. Official Nintendo Magazine remarked in 2009, "This early SNES title is still enjoyable enough to be considered a true classic."

In February 2006, Pilotwings was listed as the 153rd best game on a Nintendo console by Nintendo Power. They also listed it as the 20th best game on the Super NES. IGN listed it in their list of the "Top 100 Games of All Time" at number 74 in 2003, and at number 91 in 2007. They later named it the 80th best Super NES game. It was named the 16th best game on the Super NES by GameDaily in 2008, while Game Informer listed it at number 131 in its list of the "Top 200 Games of All Time" in 2009. In 2009, Official Nintendo Magazine ranked the game number 61 on its list of the "100 Best Nintendo Games". In April 1996, Super Play named it the tenth greatest game for the Super NES. In 2018, Complex rated the game 77th on their list of "The Best Super Nintendo Games of All Time". In 1995, Total! placed the game at number 20 on their list of the "Top 100 SNES Games". In 1996, GamesMaster ranked Pilotwings 30th in its list of the "Top 100 Games of All Time".

Pilotwings sold over two million copies worldwide by 1995. A sequel, Pilotwings 64, was released for the Nintendo 64 in 1996 as a launch title for its respective system. A second sequel for the Nintendo 64, which showed off the console's capabilities, was cancelled due to lack of development resources within Nintendo. In 2003, it was announced that Factor 5 was working on a GameCube incarnation of the Pilotwings series. Development was moved to Nintendo's Wii console shortly thereafter. However, an anonymous blogger claimed in late 2009 that Factor 5 had indeed finished working on it, but that Nintendo was not confident in publishing it. Nintendo finally announced a new title in the series, the Nintendo 3DS title Pilotwings Resort, at E3 2010. The new title was released as a launch title for the 3DS in North America on March 27, 2011.

The game has been featured in the Game On historical exhibition organized by the Barbican Centre, including a display at the Science Museum in London in 2007. Nintendo re-released Pilotwings on the Wii Virtual Console service in PAL regions and North America in 2009 and in Japan in 2010, and then on the Wii U Virtual Console in 2013. On September 5, 2019, the game became available on the Nintendo Classics service for the Nintendo Switch.

In 2023, Roger Waters made reference to the game in a narrative dream sequence involving a battle of good versus evil in On The Run, the 3rd track of The Dark Side of the Moon Redux.

A stage based on Pilotwings makes an appearance in Super Smash Bros. for Wii U and Super Smash Bros. Ultimate. The stage combines elements from the original Super NES game and Pilotwings Resort.
