= Pilotwings Resort =

2011 video game

- Packaging artwork for all territories
- Developers: Monster Games; Nintendo SPD
- Publisher: Nintendo
- Director: Richard Garcia
- Producers: Shinya Takahashi; Kensuke Tanabe; Keisuke Terasaki
- Designer: John Schneider
- Composer: Asuka Ito
- Series: Pilotwings
- Platform: Nintendo 3DS
- Release: EU: March 25, 2011; NA: March 27, 2011; JP: April 14, 2011
- Genres: Arcade flight, Flight simulation video game
- Mode: Single-player

Pilotwings Resort (Note: Japanese: パイロットウイングス リゾート, Hepburn: Pairottouingusu Rizōto) is an arcade flight game for the Nintendo 3DS handheld game console, developed by Monster Games and published by Nintendo. It is a sequel to the 1990 SNES video game Pilotwings and the 1996 Nintendo 64 game Pilotwings 64. Similarly to its predecessors, it was confirmed as a launch title for the Nintendo 3DS in North America and Europe. It was released in Japan, Australia and New Zealand on April 14, 2011.

Nintendo later re-released the game, along with some of their earlier, published games for the Nintendo 3DS, as a downloadable title via Nintendo eShop. The downloadable version became available on November 1, 2012 in Japan, November 22, 2012 in the PAL region and December 20, 2012 in North America.

== Gameplay ==
Pilotwings Resort contains two modes of play. The first mode, "Free Flight Mode", allows the player to freely explore Wuhu Island using any type of aircraft they have unlocked. Various collectibles such as balloons and stunt rings can be picked up to unlock certain features in the game, like diorama statues and the player's very own castle on the archipelago's private island. In this mode, there is a time limit which is extended for the next playthrough when the player has collected a set number of balloons. The second mode, "Mission Mode", requires the player to complete a series of objectives within certain parameters. The player is graded between one and three stars on their performance in each mission. These increasingly difficult missions span Training, Bronze, Silver, Gold, Platinum and Diamond classes (the latter only being unlocked after achieving a three star rank on every mission). When players achieve higher star rankings, they grow closer to unlocking several in-game bonuses, including a "Meca Hawk" robot from Pilotwings 64 that walks around Wedge Island and alternate credits.

The basic aircraft are a plane, a rocket belt, and a hang glider. As players progress through Mission Mode, they unlock the "Super Vehicles," consisting of the turbo jet, the super rocket belt, and the pedal glider. Each holds its advantages, like the turbo jet being able to fly at high speeds, but each is more difficult to control. The Super Vehicles are all featured in their own finales in the Diamond Class missions. A flying squirrel suit is also available in the game, but it is not an unlockable vehicle and only appears in one mission.

== Development ==
Pilotwings Resort was announced by Nintendo at the E3 2010, where a playable demo was featured that revealed the return of plane and rocket belt missions. Later media unveiled the return of the hang gliding missions as well. Pilotwings Resort is the first Nintendo 3DS game to feature Mii characters, and is set on the fictional Wuhu Island, which was originally featured in the Wii Fit series and Wii Sports Resort. The latter had featured its own flight sporting event, which was adapted for this game.

== Reception ==
Reception

Aggregate score
Aggregator	Score
Metacritic	71/100 (64 reviews)

Review scores
Publication	Score
1Up.com	B
Edge	6/10
Eurogamer	8/10
Famitsu	31/40
IGN	7/10
Nintendo World Report	8/10
Official Nintendo Magazine	81%

The game's first review, from Eurogamer, was generally positive. It received an 8/10, stating "...Pilotwings ultimately hits an enjoyable sweet spot. It's intricate enough to encourage mastery, and roomy enough to tempt you back after the main event, while the skilfully simple presentation makes it perfect for demonstrating your latest gadget's 3D capabilities." Official Nintendo Magazine's review was also relatively positive. They gave it 81%, saying "Pilotwings Resort is a lovely game, with its beautiful 3D vistas and responsive, satisfying controls. We only wish there was more of it." Their verdict was, "While this looks and feels amazing, there just isn't quite enough." IGN gave the game a 7/10, criticizing the lack of multiplayer, but also noting that "there is a definitely benefit in using 3D."[sic] GameSpot scored it a 6.5/10. They praised the game for intuitive controls, enjoyable missions, and pleasing visuals, but the game was too short, did not have enough content, and no high score sharing.

Pilotwings Resort sold an initial 26,554 units in Japan during its debut week, making it the best-selling 3DS game and the sixth-best selling game overall for that week. However, sales quickly tapered off, with the game having sold just 57,846 copies in the region by its fifth week.

== See also ==
- Wii Sports Resort
