= Jacek Bławut =

Polish film director, screenwriter, and cinematographer (born 1950)

- Born: 3 November 1950 (age 75)
- Citizenship: Polish
- Occupations: film director, screenwriter, cinematographer

Jacek Bławut (born 3 November 1950) is a film director, screenwriter and cinematographer.

== Biography ==
In 1982 he graduated in cinematography from the Łódź Film School.

He was a lecturer at film schools in Berlin, Hanover, Toruń (Camerimage Film School), and Warsaw (Andrzej Wajda Master School of Directing). From 1992 to 1994, he was co-editor of Film na Świecie magazine. In 2003 he was elected a member of the European Film Academy. From 2008 to 2011 he was member of the Council of the Polish Film Institute. Since 2011, he was deputy member of the management board of the Polish Filmmakers Association. Since 2010, he has been lecturer at the Łódź Film School. In 2020 he obtained habilitation.

His son Jacek Piotr Bławut “Tumult” (born 1978) is a film director, screenwriter, cinematographer and musician and his daughter Weronika Pliszka is a film editor.

== Filmography ==
=== Cinematography ===
- Życie wewnętrzne (1986)
- Łuk Erosa (1987)
- Dekalog: Ten (1988)
- Porno (1989 film) (1989)
- Dzień świra (2002)

=== Writing, directing ===
- Jeszcze nie wieczór (2008)
- Wirtualna wojna (2012)
- Below The Surface (2022)

=== Actor ===
- Nad rzeką (1962) as boy

== Accolades ==
He received Stanisław Wyspiański Award, 2nd degree, for achievements in the field of cinematography in 1988, Award of the Chairman of the Cinematography Committee “Laterna Magica” for outstanding contributions to film culture in 1993, and Paszport Polityki in 1993.

In 2008, he won Silver Lion at the Polish Feature Film Festival in Gdynia for Before Twilight. In 2013, he won Polish Academy Award for Best Documentary for Wirtualna wojna. In 2019, he received Gold Gloria Artis Medal for Merit to Culture. In 2022, at the 47th Polish Feature Film Festival in Gdynia, he received award for directing the film Below The Surface.
