= Wirtualna wojna =

- Directed by: Jacek Bławut
- Screenplay by: Jacek Bławut
- Produced by: Jacek Bławut, Jerzy Dzięgielewski, Aleksander Kutela, Anna Skonieczna
- Cinematography: Jerzy Rudziński, Michał Marczak, Jacek Bławut, Jacek Piotr Bławut, Michał Ostatkiewicz
- Edited by: Jacek Bławut, Weronika Bławut
- Music by: Tomasz Stroynowski
- Release date: 2012

Wirtualna wojna is a 2012 documentary film directed by Jacek Bławut.

It is about men interested in World War II and realizing their historical interest using the Il-2 Sturmovik, a computer flight simulator.

In 2013 it won Polish Academy Award for Best Documentary and Gdańsk DocFilm Festival "Godność i Praca" Grand Prize "Great Gate of Freedom".
