= Infinite Flight =

2011 flight simulator computer program

- Developer: Infinite Flight LLC
- Publisher: Infinite Flight LLC
- Platforms: Android, iOS
- Release: April 25, 2011 for Windows Phone
- Genre: Flight simulation video game
- Modes: Single-player, multiplayer

Infinite Flight is a flight simulation video game developed by Infinite Flight Corporation (formerly Flying Development Studio and Infinite Flight LLC). The game was initially released in 2011 on Windows Phone before expanding to other platforms. It is now available for Android and iOS.

== Gameplay ==
The simulator includes single-player and multiplayer modes, including an option to play as air traffic control. As a mobile game, Infinite Flight relies on the device's accelerometer or a joystick for flight control.

== Reception ==
In a 2011 review, Windows Central wrote that the simulator got better with experience and would likely appeal to fans of the genre. In 2012, The Mac Observer gave the first release a score of 2.5/5 ("Disappointing"), comparing it negatively to other flight simulators. In 2014, Engadget considered Infinite Flight one of the best on the App Store and The New York Times called it the best on mobile devices. FlightSim.com later wrote approvingly of the just-released C-130 aircraft, saying that the game's newer models were much better than earlier ones.
