= IL-2 Sturmovik: Great Battles =

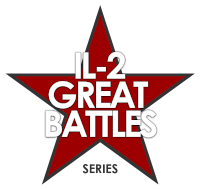
- Developer: 1C Game Studios
- Publisher: 1C Company
- Platform: Microsoft Windows
- Release: 19 November 2013
- Genre: Combat flight simulator
- Modes: Single-player, multiplayer

IL-2 Sturmovik: Great Battles is a set of standalone video games and the third generation game in the IL-2 Sturmovik series of combat flight simulators. The two first modules were released in 2013 (IL-2 Sturmovik: Battle of Stalingrad) and 2016 (IL-2 Sturmovik: Battle of Moscow) and it was not before November 2017 that the series officially received its current name. In 2019, the first World War I and tank modules in the entire IL-2 Sturmovik series were released (IL-2 Sturmovik: Flying Circus and IL-2 Sturmovik: Tank Crew, respectively).

All modules in the Great Battles series use the same game engine, so improvements to the game engine have retroactively been applied to modules that were released before. A campaign can also run through multiple modules, and airplanes can be used across modules.

1C Game Studios is working on a new game engine, which will be used for future modules, starting with IL-2 Korea.

== History ==
The original brand was created in 2001 with the first IL-2 Sturmovik air combat simulator. That latter is in the present day officially titled IL-2 Sturmovik: 1946 as this was the title of its "Complete Edition" back in 2006, the final compilation of add-ons in the first generation of IL-2 games.

The second generation was released in 2011 under the title IL-2 Sturmovik: Cliffs of Dover.

All three generations, IL-2 Sturmovik: 1946, IL-2 Sturmovik: Cliffs of Dover, and IL-2 Sturmovik: Great Battles, are still in use and supported by the current owner of the IL-2 Sturmovik label, Russian company 1C Company.

Before the IL-2 Sturmovik: Great Battles brand was coined in 2017, two "IL-2 Sturmovik: Battle of" modules were released: IL-2 Sturmovik: Battle of Stalingrad in 2013 and IL-2 Sturmovik: Battle of Moscow in 2016. The original Battle of Stalingrad module resulted in 2013 of a combined effort of 1C Company, the publisher of IL-2 Sturmovik: Cliffs of Dover, and 777 Studios, developers of Rise of Flight: The First Great Air War who reused the 2009 Rise of Flight "Digital Nature" game engine in order to develop the Battle of Stalingrad game. On 17 November 2017, accumulated improvements in the Digital Nature simulation engine led the development team to change its name to "Digital Warfare Engine".

== Theaters of operations and compatible simulations ==
At launch in 2013, the game was a combat flight simulation set during the Battle of Stalingrad (1942-1943), specifically the time period between Operation Uranus and the surrender of the 6th Army. From 2016 onwards, advanced improvements of the game started allowing users to fly aircraft in other World War II battles (Battle of Moscow, Battle of Kuban, Operation Bodenplatte, Battle of Normandy), fly World War I aircraft (Flying Circus series) or drive World War II tanks (Tank Crew: Clash at Prokhorovka).

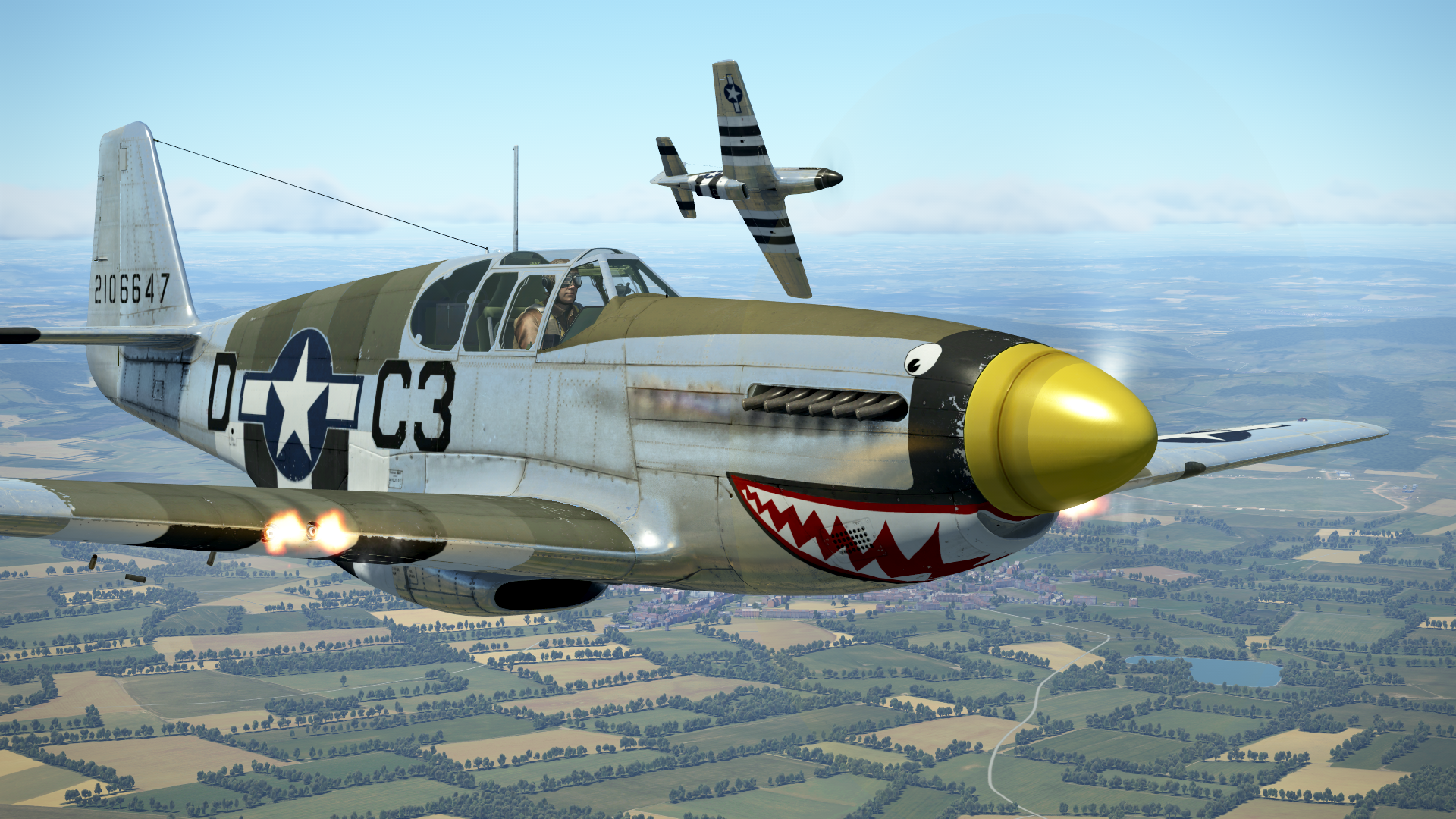
P51B in Battle of Normandy

== Development and release ==
in December 2012 1C Company officially announced they have halted development for IL-2 Sturmovik: Cliffs of Dover, replacing it with a partnership having been agreed with 777 Studios to form 1C Game Studios for the development of IL-2 Sturmovik: Battle of Stalingrad.

Access to an early alpha was made available for "Premium Edition" owners on November 19, 2013.

The release date was originally planned for the first quarter of 2014.

The full release date has been marked as October 20, 2014, on the Steam digital market.

In December 2016, DirectX 11 support was added.

In April 2017, virtual reality support was added.

== Released modules in the Great Battles series ==
IL-2 Sturmovik: Battle of Stalingrad is the 13th installment in the IL-2 Sturmovik series, but due to differences between game engines, it is considered to belong to the third generation of IL-2 Sturmovik simulators series. On 17 November 2017, the development team announced several new titles for that third IL-2 generation and that the generation would be called IL-2 Great Battles series. All modules are standalone games and do not require any other module in the series to be played. The exception being Steam, which requires the purchase of the Battle of Stalingrad before purchasing any of the other modules.

=== IL-2 Sturmovik: Battle of Stalingrad ===
IL-2 Sturmovik: Battle of Stalingrad: 2013 original logo.

The first simulator in the series, released on 19 November 2013. On 22 October 2014 the game was added to the Steam online gaming service.

=== IL-2 Sturmovik: Battle of Moscow ===
IL-2 Sturmovik: Battle of Moscow was released in 2016. This expands Battle of Stalingrad by focusing on the aerial operations during the defense of Moscow.

=== IL-2 Sturmovik: Battle of Kuban ===
IL-2 Sturmovik: Battle of Kuban was released in 2018. The third installment is dedicated to large scale aerial battles between the Red Air Force and the Luftwaffe in the skies over the Kuban front in 1943.

=== IL-2 Sturmovik: Battle of Bodenplatte ===
IL-2 Sturmovik: Battle of Bodenplatte was released in 2019. It is the first installment in the series to feature the western front by focusing on the skies over western Germany, Netherlands and Belgium during Operation Bodenplatte, the last and final large-scale offensive by the Luftwaffe in the closing stages of World War II. It includes aircraft that were operated by the USAAF, Royal Air Force and Luftwaffe, notably including a player-flyable Messerschmitt Me 262, the first jet aircraft of the Great Battles series.

=== IL-2 Sturmovik: Battle of Normandy ===
IL-2 Sturmovik: Battle of Normandy was announced in November 2019 and released on September 7, 2022. This installment focuses on the late war aerial engagements between the USAAF, Royal Air Force and the Luftwaffe in the skies over the Normandy and Calais regions of France before and after the Battle of Normandy.

=== IL-2 Sturmovik: Flying Circus ===
IL-2 Sturmovik: Flying Circus, directly taken from the nickname of Jagdgeschwader I, a famous German aviation combat unit during World War I, is the title of a series of simulators set in the Great War. It is the spiritual successor to Rise of Flight: The First Great Air War (2009) within the contemporary game engine of the IL-2 Sturmovik: Great Battles series. The first volume in the WWI series was announced on 17 November 2017 and subsequently released on 7 November 2019 under the title of IL-2 Sturmovik: Flying Circus – Volume 1. The second volume was announced on 14 December 2020 and released on 29 March 2023 in collaboration with Ugra Media and the third volume released on 19 December 2023.

=== IL-2 Sturmovik: Tank Crew ===
IL-2 Sturmovik: Tank Crew is the title of a series of tank simulation games, all of them set in World War II. Tank Crew is compatible with all other World War II combat flight simulation modules in the Great Battles series: while some users are playing an online game on the simulated tank crew seats, others can sit in simulated cockpits and fly on board simulated aircraft, as usual in the Great Battles series. The first module in the Tank Crew series, titled IL-2 Sturmovik: Tank Crew – Clash at Prokhorovka, was announced on 17 November 2017 and finally released in November 2019.

== Reception ==
SimHQ gave the game a score of 7/10, noting that the game was "a very clinically nice piece of software, but lacking the immersion and emotion of other titles of the period."

Reception

Aggregate score
Aggregator	Score
Metacritic	74

Review score
Publication	Score
SimHQ	7/10
