= Precision Manuals Development Group =

Flight simulation company

PMDG Simulations LLC Precision Manuals Development Group
- Type: Software Developer
- Industry: Flight Simulator Software
- Founded: 1997
- Headquarters: Las Vegas, Nevada, United States
- Key people: Robert S. Randazzo (founder)
- Number of employees: 51-200
- Website: https://pmdg.com/

Precision Manuals Development Group (PMDG), legally PMDG Simulations LLC, is a commercial add-on aircraft developer for the Microsoft Flight Simulator, Lockheed Martin Prepar3D, and X-Plane series, founded by Robert S. Randazzo. The company is based in Las Vegas, Nevada, however has several employees in countries such as Belgium, South Africa, and Canada. It has eight employees as of 2018, with a collection of beta testers.

== History ==
Precision Manuals Development Group was founded by Robert S. Randazzo, Senior Developer, in January 1998. Originally conceived as a small technical publishing company, PMDG's first product, the 747-400PS1 User's Guide was released in February 1998, to assist non-pilots with mastering the aircraft. The 747-400PS1 User's Guide was made unavailable in early 2000.

PMDG launched the FS98 Series Aircraft Operating Manual product line for use with Microsoft Flight Simulator 98.

PMDG's AOM product line for Flight Simulator 98 included an installable addon which aimed to improve the flight physics model within the game.

In August 1999, PMDG became the first software developer to formally announce support for FLY! by Terminal Reality.

PMDG released the FLY! Airliner Series Boeing 757-200ER on December 18, 1999.

PMDG's Boeing 767-200/300 for FLY! was the last to utilize the simulator's default autopilot system.

On April 6, 2012, PMDG announced plans to move their headquarters to Virginia, where the company was founded.

PMDG has regularly used AVSIM forums for announcements and user support until their own website was made available in 2018.

== Aircraft ==
PMDG has created nine aircraft for Flight Simulator 2004 and ten aircraft for Flight Simulator X, two of which are extensions of the 747-400X. The 777-200LR and accompanying 777-300ER expansion were the first PMDG products for Lockheed Martin's Prepar3D as well as Flight Simulator X.

On January 6, 2016, PMDG released the Douglas DC-6 simulation for the X-Plane flight simulator series. It's PMDG's first and only aircraft ever released for the X-Plane series.

On February 24, 2019, PMDG announced that they would cease creating new products for 32-bit platforms (not precluding updates to existing products) which included FSX, FSX Steam Edition, and P3Dv3.

On November 8, 2019, the PMDG NGXu was released. It's an improved version of their previous Boeing 737 product for the Prepar3D platform and offers the BCF, BDSF, BBJ1, and BBJ2 variants as expansions. PMDG had announced the previous day that all development for the X-Plane platform as well as all 32-bit platforms would be cancelled in favor of P3Dv4 and preparation for the release of MSFS2020. On October 20, 2020, PMDG announced the development of the 777X family of airliners was in an early stage. In mid-June 2021, all products for X-Plane and FSX were retired ahead of the release of their first product for the new Microsoft Flight Simulator.

In years past, PMDG required users to buy addons which were bundled with two or more variants of the aircraft family. For example: The Boeing 737-800 and -900 were included as one separate installer and acted as a "base pack", meaning if users wanted to fly the -600 or -700 variants, they would need to purchase the base pack (-800 and -900) and purchase the -600 and -700 pack (sold as an "expansion pack"). The same went for their 777 and 747 product lines. That changed with the advent of MSFS2020 which saw PMDG shift their business model to allow users to purchase specific variants they desired. Meaning that each variant could be purchased as its own separate pack without the need to purchase a base pack or expansion pack (i.e. users could buy the 737-800 only if they desired). Each variant included special configurations like the freighter and BBJ models. This would be the business model PMDG would use moving forward.

PMDG's first FS2020 product was the Douglas DC-6 which released on June 18, 2021. The next year saw the release of the Boeing 737-700 on May 9th, 2022, and the eventual release of the other variants in the 737NG series starting with the -600, -800, and then the -900. PMDG previously stated they were developing the 737 MAX however, the project was halted in favor of prioritizing development for the 747.

PMDG then shifted to their first widebody aircraft, the Boeing 777-300ER, which was released on June 25, 2024. This was followed by the release of the 777F a few months later on December 6th. The -200ER and LR are expected to follow respectively. The Boeing 747 has been in development with plans to include the classic variants alongside the (-400 and -8) exclusively for Microsoft Flight Simulator 2024.

Aircraft	Flight Simulator 2004	Flight Simulator X	Prepar3D v2/v3	Prepar3D v3/v4	Prepar3D v4/v5	X-Plane 10	Microsoft Flight Simulator	Notes
Boeing 737-600/700 NG	2003							Retired
Boeing 737-800/900 NG Expansion	2003							Retired
Beechcraft 1900D	2004							Retired
Beechcraft 1900C	2004							Retired
Boeing 747-400 Queen of the Skies (QOTS)	2005							Retired
Boeing 747-400F QOTS Expansion	2006							Retired
Boeing 747-400v2 Queen of the Skies (QOTS)		October 30, 2007						Retired
Boeing 747-8i/F QOTS Expansion		July 29, 2010						Retired, Visual model only
Boeing 747LCF QOTS Expansion		September 26, 2010						Retired, Visual model only
McDonnell Douglas MD-11	October 14, 2008	October 14, 2008						Retired
Jetstream 4100		September 9, 2009						Retired
Boeing 737-800/900 NGX		August 4, 2011	March 6, 2015					Retired
Boeing 737-600/700 NGX Expansion		October 29, 2011	March 6, 2015					Retired
Boeing 777-200LR/F		September 5, 2013		February 7, 2015	February 26, 2021			Retired
Boeing 777-300ER Expansion		July 18, 2014		February 7, 2015	February 26, 2021			Retired
Boeing 777-200ER Expansion					February 26, 2021			Retired
Douglas DC-6		July 20, 2017		July 20, 2017		June 1, 2016	June 18, 2021	Retired except MSFS
Boeing 747-400V3 QoTS II		January 31, 2017		January 31, 2017	May 8, 2020			Retired Includes 400, 400D, 400M, 400ER, 400F, 400ERF
Boeing 747-8i/F Expansion		September 22, 2018		September 22, 2018	May 8, 2020			Retired
Boeing 737-800/900 NGXu					November 8, 2019			Retired For a short time after release, users could purchase the aircraft and earn a discount when purchasing the 737 NG3 for MSFS when it eventually released
Boeing 737-600/700 NGXu Expansion					February 5, 2020			Retired
Boeing 737 NGXu Cargo Expansion					August 16, 2020			Retired Includes 737-700 BDSF, 737-800 BDSF and BCF
Boeing 737 NGXu BBJ Expansion					October 23, 2020			Retired Includes 737-700 BBJ and 737-800 BBJ
Boeing 737 NG3							737-700 - May 9, 2022 || 737-600 - July 29, 2022 || 737-800 - August 25, 2022 737-900 - February 7, 2023	737-700 includes BBJ1 and BDSF 737-800 includes BBJ2, BDSF and BCF 737-900 includes BBJ3 and ER version
Boeing 777-300ER							June 25th, 2024	
Boeing 777F							December 6th, 2024	
Boeing 777-200ER							May 1st, 2025	
Boeing 777-200LR							July 17th, 2025	
Boeing 777X							In Development	Early development stage, no platforms announced (likely MSFS2024)
Boeing 747 Family							In Development	(Likely to be released for MSFS2024), 747-100, 747SP, 747-200, 747-300, 747-300, 747-400, 747-8 (Including special versions such as VC-25 or RA-001)
