= IL-2 Sturmovik: Cliffs of Dover =

2011 video game

- Original 2011 cover art (DVD keep case)
- Developers: 1C:Maddox Games; Team Fusion Simulations
- Publishers: CIS: 1C Company; NA: Ubisoft
- Platform: Microsoft Windows
- Release: RU: March 25, 2011; EU: March 31, 2011; NA: April 26, 2011; JP: July 29, 2011
- Genre: Combat flight simulator
- Modes: Single-player, Multiplayer

IL-2 Sturmovik: Cliffs of Dover (Russian: Ил-2 Штурмовик: Битва за Британию) is a World War II combat flight simulator released in 2011. It was originally developed by the Russian software house 1C:Maddox Games but since 2012 it is under development by Team Fusion Simulations. In 2017 that latter released an improved version of the game under the name IL-2 Sturmovik: Cliffs of Dover - Blitz which started the so called Dover series. The basic Blitz game represents the Battle of Britain during the summer of 1940 while an add-on released in 2020 represents the air combats during the Western Desert campaign in North Africa in the period of 1940-1942. A second add-on is in the works to cover the leadup to and the Dieppe Raid with a release date of the second half of 2024.

The game inherits the name IL-2 Sturmovik from the IL-2 Sturmovik classical simulator (originally released in 2001) and is considered as the second generation in the IL-2 Sturmovik series because it runs its own game engine instead of sharing it with the two other generations.

Similar to the original game back in 2011, the 2017 Blitz rerelease requires the Steam service to run.

== Development and release ==
During development the game was originally called Storm of War: Battle of Britain and scheduled as a November 2006 release. In January 2011 Ubisoft revealed the current name for the game and release date of 25 March 2011.

When IL-2 Sturmovik: Cliffs of Dover was still under development, the aerobatic Sukhoi Su-26 (not a WWII era plane) had been promised as a bonus flyable aircraft for all players, but was not included in the game upon release. Nevertheless, the Su-26 was finally included as a free downloadable content with the adjunction of the Steam patch 1.11.20362 on 19 October 2012.

In October 2012, it was revealed on the 1C forums that development had fallen short of the original goals and that 1C:Maddox Games was unwilling to continue supporting the title. Cliffs of Dover was planned to be supplemented by a new theater, Moscow, but 1C chose not to continue development with the game engine, instead incorporating a similar, Russian, theatre into the next title in the series with a new game engine, IL-2 Sturmovik: Battle of Stalingrad. That latter, the third generation in the IL-2 series, is being developed by 1C Company and 777 Studios, which is the developer of the WWI flight simulator Rise of Flight: The First Great Air War. This makes IL-2 Sturmovik: Cliffs of Dover the second generation in the IL-2 Sturmovik series of air combat simulators.

== Distribution at release and collector's edition ==
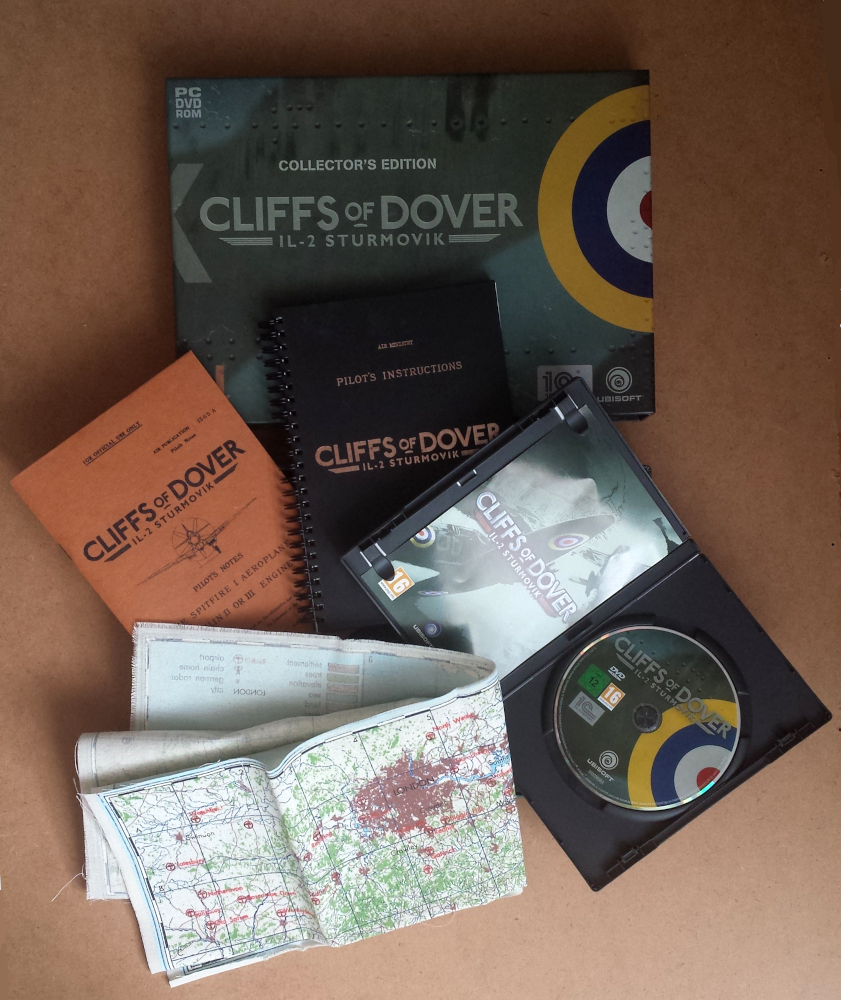
One unboxed copy of the collector's edition of the game

At release, on 25 March 2011, the game was distributed in a usual format at the time, an installation DVD that was contained in a standard keep case. It was distributed to specialised retail shops, chain stores, and online authorised sellers.

A special edition called Collector's Edition was also distributed and sold as of the same date. The collector's edition was a boxed set that contained the very same standard DVD for installation of the game, but presented too a few additional features:

- A spiral-bound booklet manual for the player.
- A facsimile copy of a British Spitfire aircraft manual of 1940.
- A map of the main theatre of operations in the game, the English Channel. That map, made out of fabric, was water-repellent and 50 cm x 50 cm in size.

== Team Fusion Simulations modding and official development ==
Shortly after the announcement of official development ceasing for Cliffs of Dover, a community modding team known as Team Fusion further stabilized and enhanced the game by community patches.

On 21 December 2016, it was announced that 1C Game Studios had come to an agreement with the re-named Team Fusion Simulations to cooperate on future releases of Cliffs of Dover, and grant them access to the game's source code. A patched and improved version, IL-2 Sturmovik: Cliffs of Dover - Blitz, was released in December 2017, and owners of the original game received free access to the new version.

On 6 August 2020, Team Fusion Simulations released the first official Blitz add-on, IL-2 Sturmovik: Desert Wings – Tobruk, which is set in the skies of North Africa during the Western Desert campaign from 1940 to 1942.

A third add-on, IL-2 Sturmovik: Fortresses and Focke - Wulfs-Dieppe is currently in development. It will cover the time period over the English Channel, English and French countryside from 1941 to 1942, and include Operation Cerberus and the Dieppe Raid. Future add-ons will cover the Battles of El Alamein and the Siege of Malta (World War II)

== Gameplay ==
The game features singleplayer mode, which can be played in campaigns, single missions, or user-created missions made with the in-game mission editor. Therefore the players can create their own scenarios. It also features a multiplayer mode that can support up to 128 players as well as AI-controlled aircraft. It is also possible to play in a co-op mode.

Cliffs of Dover is known for its complex and detailed damage modelling system, which models the aircraft's airframe, engine, cooling systems, control systems and more, and accurately applies damage to the correct part of the correct system when hit by a bullet. The cockpits in the game are fully modelled in 3D, and many of the switches can be operated with the mouse.

== Modelled aircraft in the game ==
Since its release the flyable planes in Cliffs of Dover include historical iconic aircraft such as the Supermarine Spitfire, the Hawker Hurricane, the Messerschmitt Bf 109, or the Messerschmitt Bf 110. Upon release, the original version of the game included over 30 aircraft, over 15 flyable and 15 AI-controlled. In subsequent years, as of 2012, Team Fusion brought to the game a few new player flyable aircraft like the Bf 109 E-1 or the Bf 109 E-4, among others. In 2017 IL-2 Sturmovik: Cliffs of Dover was rereleased as an improved version titled IL-2 Sturmovik: Cliffs of Dover - Blitz. For the occasion, Team Fusion Simulations had modelled new flyable airplanes which increased the number of planes up to a total of 48 player flyable aircraft with 16 additional planes which can be AI-controlled. In the summer of 2020, the Desert Wings - Tobruk add-on (which requires IL-2 Sturmovik: Cliffs of Dover - Blitz to be played) brought the Western Desert campaign theater of operations (from 1940 to 1942), and added 40 new flyable types and variants of planes, including Italian, French, and American, as well as nine new campaigns in which the player flies a variety of aircraft. The Fortresses and Focke-Wulfs - Dieppe add-on will add 18 new flyable planes and variants including the Focke-Wulf Fw 190, Hawker Typhoon, P-51A, and B-17.

== Reception ==
Reception

Aggregate scores
Aggregator	Score
GameRankings	51.40%
Metacritic	60/100

Review scores
Publication	Score
GameSpot	4/10
IGN	6/10
PC Gamer (UK)	72%
PC Gamer (US)	45%

The game was met with very mixed reception upon release, as GameRankings gave it a score of 51.40%, while Metacritic gave it 60 out of 100.

The preliminary critical Metacritic rating for the Blitz edition release is 70 out of 100.

PC Pilot Magazine rated the add-on IL-2 Sturmovik: Desert Wings – Tobruk with a score of 85 out of 100.
