= Pilotwings =

Video game series

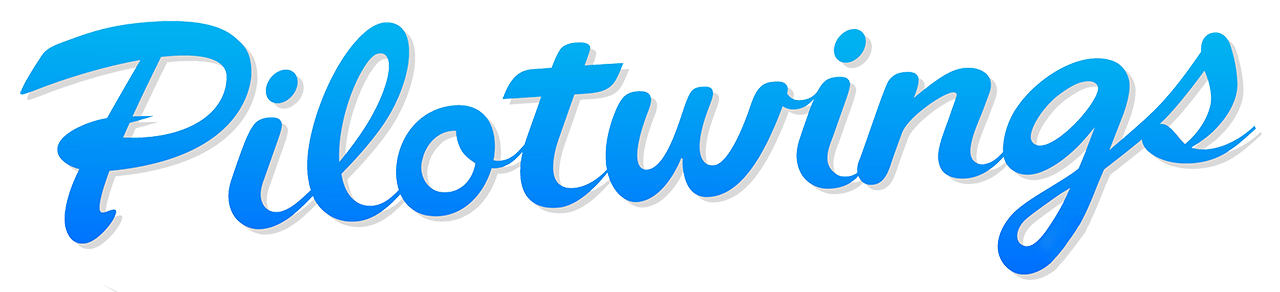
- Logo since 2011
- Genre: Amateur flight simulation
- Developers: Nintendo EAD (1990-1996); Nintendo R&D3 (1996); Paradigm Simulation (1996); Monster Games (2011)
- Publisher: Nintendo
- Creator: Shigeru Miyamoto
- Composer: Soyo Oka
- Platforms: Super NES, Nintendo 64, Nintendo 3DS
- First release: Pilotwings; December 21, 1990
- Latest release: Pilotwings Resort; March 25, 2011

Pilotwings is a series of flight simulation video games beginning with the 1990 video game Pilotwings and most recently Pilotwings Resort in 2011. One of Nintendo's franchises, the series was released on the Super Nintendo Entertainment System (SNES), Nintendo 64, and Nintendo 3DS.

Notable for its revolutionary 3D gameplay, Pilotwings was created by Shigeru Miyamoto, with the games being developed by Nintendo EAD (Pilotwings), Paradigm Simulation (Pilotwings 64, in collaboration with Nintendo EAD), and Monster Games (Pilotwings Resort). All three games were published by Nintendo.

== Gameplay ==
All three games in the series have gameplay elements in common, such as hang gliders and jet packs. They also have mission modes. Pilotwings Resort, unlike the previous two games in the series, is set on Wuhu Island and is in Autostereoscopy 3D.

== Games ==
Release timeline
1990	Pilotwings
1991
1992
1993
1994
1995
1996	Pilotwings 64
1997
1998
1999
2000
2001
2002
2003
2004
2005
2006
2007
2008
2009
2010
2011	Pilotwings Resort

=== Pilotwings ===
Pilotwings (Note: Japanese: パイロットウイングス, Hepburn: Pairottouingusu) is a video game for the Super NES. It was developed by Nintendo's Entertainment Analysis and Development (EAD) division, led by producer Shigeru Miyamoto. The game was originally released in Japan on December 21, 1990, shortly after the launch of the Super Famicom. It was released as a launch title for the Super NES console on August 23, 1991 in North America, with a European release following in 1992.

Pilotwings is an amateur flight simulator game in which the player attempts to earn pilot licenses through lessons in light plane flight, hang gliding, skydiving, and the use of a rocket belt. Bonus stages and levels involving an attack helicopter are also available. Each event offers unique controls and gameplay mechanics. To increase the realism of the game's flight simulation, the developers extensively utilized the Super NES's Mode 7 capability, which mimics 3D graphics by rotating and scaling flat objects.

The game was well received upon its release, largely thanks to its graphical presentation. The game has since been re-released on the Virtual Console service for both the Wii, Wii U and the New Nintendo 3DS consoles in PAL regions, North America, and Japan. A sequel, Pilotwings 64, was released for the Nintendo 64 in 1996. After many years of announcements and cancellations, Nintendo unveiled a second sequel, Pilotwings Resort, for the Nintendo 3DS handheld at the Electronic Entertainment Expo (E3) 2010 which released in 2011.

=== Pilotwings 64 ===
Pilotwings 64 (Note: Japanese: パイロットウイングス64, Hepburn: Pairottouingusu Rokujūyon) is a video game for the Nintendo 64, originally released in 1996 along with the debut of the console. The game was co-developed by Nintendo EAD (who developed the original game) and the American visual technology group Paradigm Simulation. It was one of three launch titles for the Nintendo 64 in Japan as well as Europe and one of two launch titles in North America. Pilotwings 64 is a follow-up to Pilotwings for the Super NES, which was a North American launch game for its respective console in 1991. Also like that game, Pilotwings 64 received production input from Nintendo producer and EAD General Manager Shigeru Miyamoto.

Pilotwings 64 is a 3D amateur flight simulator that puts the player in control of one of six pilots as they try to earn pilot licenses through various forms of aviation. The events are flying an autogyro, using a jet pack, and hang gliding. Several bonus tasks are offered, such as skydiving and a human cannonball test. The game also puts focus on allowing the player to freely explore its detailed 3D environments, most notably a miniature representation of the United States.

The game received positive review scores and praise from gaming publications and news sources alike for its visual presentation and flying controls. Similar to its Super NES predecessor, Pilotwings 64 serves to demonstrate the graphical capabilities of its gaming hardware. Although the flight simulator did not enjoy the same commercial success as its fellow launch game Super Mario 64, Pilotwings 64 nonetheless went on to sell over one million copies worldwide.

=== Pilotwings Resort ===
Pilotwings Resort (Note: Japanese: パイロットウイングス リゾート, Hepburn: Pairottouingusu Rizōto) is an amateur flight simulation video game for the Nintendo 3DS handheld game console, developed by Monster Games and published by Nintendo. It is a sequel to the 1990 Super NES game Pilotwings and the 1996 Nintendo 64 game Pilotwings 64, and takes inspiration from the 2009 Wii game Wii Sports Resort. It is the first game in the series to also be in the Wii series. Similarly to its predecessors, it was confirmed as a launch title in North America and Europe. In Japan, Australia, and New Zealand it was released on April 14, 2011.

Nintendo re-released the game, along with some of their earlier, published games for the Nintendo 3DS, as a downloadable title via Nintendo eShop. The downloadable version became available on November 1, 2012 in Japan, November 22, 2012 in the PAL region, and December 20, 2012 in North America.
