= Bravo Air Race =

1997 video game

- Bravo Air Race NTSC front cover (PS1)
- Developer: Xing Entertainment
- Publisher: THQ
- Platform: PlayStation
- Release: JP: July 31, 1997; NA: September 1997; EU: December 1997
- Genre: Racing
- Modes: Single-player, multiplayer

Bravo Air Race (known as Reciproheat 5000 in Japan and Air Race in Europe) is an aircraft racing video game for PlayStation developed by Xing Entertainment and published by THQ in 1997.

== Aircraft ==
Bravo Air Race features prominent aircraft from different time periods. Using exploits it's possible to unlock jet planes and alternate racing colors. Players can select the following aircraft:

- Gee Bee Racer
- Pitts Special
- P-51 Mustang
- P-47 Thunderbolt
- F4U Corsair
- P-38 Lightning
- Spitfire
- Mitsubishi A6M "Zero"
- JW7 Shinden
- Messerschmitt Bf 109
- F16 Falcon
- F117 Night Hawk

The intro of the game features aircraft that are seen in the footage from the 1997 Reno Air Races (such as the T-6 Texan and the T-28 Trojan) which don't appear in the game.

== Gameplay ==
Bravo Air Race is strictly a racing game, with no available weapons for players or AI opponents to destroy each other with. Aircraft, despite obvious differences in real life, are equally balanced.

There are four courses, one of which is selected by the player after selecting their aircraft. Most of the maps feature racing through narrow ravines and canyons, diving under bridges and rock structures accompanied by sharp turns and climbing maneuvers. Airplanes can't roll, and will stop climbing at a certain altitude, forcing players to mainly stick to the course direction. The game features a time run mode and a split screen multi-player mode.

To ease the game for newcomers, there are options to switch on autopilot or activate guide markers that highlight the easiest route through each course.

== Reception ==
Reception

Review scores
Publication	Score
GameSpot	5/10
IGN	4/10
Next Generation	3/5
The News Tribune	3/5

Bravo Air Race received mediocre reviews. The most common complaint was the prevalent pop up. IGN considered it so bad that it "[makes] it impossible to judge any upcoming turn." Glenn Rubenstein of GameSpot found the graphics unimpressive in general, commenting that "Bravo Air Race looks and sounds like a ... late-generation TurboGrafx CD title." Other criticisms were the invisible barriers around the tracks and the fact that each course can only be played individually. Next Generation stated that "As an airplane racing game, Bravo fails miserably. It competes much better on an arcade level. Keep in mind that the sky is an illusion, and Bravo Air Race is well worth a second look." GamePro similarly concluded it to be "fast-moving racing fun worth at least a full-fare rental." However, GameSpot and IGN both concluded that even considered as an arcade-style title, the game is too flawed to deliver substantial fun.

== Sequel ==
A sequel to this game, Air Race Championship, was only released in Japan.
