= Hangsim =

1999 video game

- Developer: Quality Simulations
- Publisher: Wilco Publishing
- Platform: Microsoft Windows
- Release: NA: November 5, 1999; EU: 1999
- Genre: Flight simulator
- Mode: Single-player

Hangsim is a flight simulator video game that simulates hang gliding or paragliding. It was developed by Quality Simulations and published by Wilco Publishing for Windows in 1999. It was set for release in September 1999, before getting delayed to an eventual release date of November 5, 1999.

== Reception ==
Reception

Aggregate score
Aggregator	Score
GameRankings	58%

Review scores
Publication	Score
AllGame	3.5/5
CNET Gamecenter	5/10
Computer Games Strategy Plus	2.5/5
GameSpot	5.5/10
GameSpy	71%
GameStar	50%
GameZone	6.4/10
IGN	7/10
PC Gamer (US)	57%

The game received mixed reviews according to the review aggregation website GameRankings.
