= NGEN Racing =

2000 video game

N.GEN Racing
- Developer: Curly Monsters
- Publisher: Infogrames
- Platform: PlayStation
- Release: EU: May 12, 2000; NA: June 20, 2000
- Genres: Racing video game, combat flight simulator
- Modes: Single-player, multiplayer

NGEN Racing is a 2000 aircraft combat/racing video game developed by British studio Curly Monsters and published by Infogrames for the PlayStation. The gameplay consists of the player competing in flight-based races.

The game has received mostly positive reviews, with praises for the game's graphics and customization options but criticisms for the level layout and controls, with mixed reactions for the gameplay.

== Gameplay ==
In this game, players compete in races and use the winnings to add upgrades to their planes.

== Development ==
The game was released late in the PlayStation's life cycle.

== Reception ==
Reception

Aggregate score
Aggregator	Score
GameRankings	74%

Review scores
Publication	Score
AllGame	4.5/5
CNET Gamecenter	8/10
Electronic Gaming Monthly	6.83/10
Eurogamer	5/10
Game Informer	7.25/10
GameFan	77%
GameRevolution	C+
GameSpot	7.9/10
IGN	7/10
Next Generation	3/5
Official U.S. PlayStation Magazine	2.5/5

The game received above-average reviews according to the review aggregation website GameRankings. Doug Trueman of NextGen said that the game was "Not bad, but not what it could have been. And forget about seeing other planes while you're airborne."

David Smith of IGN praised the game's originality as well as its depth & level of customizability. Smith further called the game's more difficult races 'intense', but criticized its 'uninspired' and "predictible" track designs. Miguel Lopez of GameSpot called the game "innovative" and 'a reinterpretation of the genre', further praising its fast-paced action racing gameplay. He praised its 'rich' career mode, calling it the "heart of the game", as well as its normal and 'pro' control schemes, but criticized the inability to remap the controls due to 'unintuitive' control placement.

Shawn Sanders of GameRevolution praised the game's graphics as "detailed" and 'impressive for the Playstation', stating that "NGEN has some of the best graphics and background textures that I have seen in a PS title all year", further praising its colors as "bright and vivid", as well as its "very well done" particle effects and lighting. Sanders also praised its "smooth and constant" frame rate, but despite its impressive graphics and selection of planes, he criticized the game as fundamentally being 'boring', further calling its combat "kind of lame". Keith Ellis of Eurogamer praised the game's ability to customize planes, as well as the ability to choose between normal and 'pro' control schemes; he also praised the "very nice" and "colourful" graphics, but noted that "irritatingly" the player's plane blends in with the background too well, causing the player to be "passed by another plane, and not to realise it until you see your position in the race has changed". Despite later levels becoming more difficult and "frantic", Ellis expressed that he got "very bored ... far too quickly" due to the game's "repetitive" music and gameplay.
