= IL-2 Sturmovik: Birds of Prey =

2009 video game

- Developers: Gaijin Entertainment; DiP Interactive (DS); Beatshapers (PSP)
- Publishers: NA/UK: 505 Games; CIS: 1C Company; WW: Gaijin Entertainment (PC) (Note: Retail versions for PC were published by 777 Studios in North America and Iceberg Interactive in the United Kingdom.)
- Composer: Jeremy Soule
- Series: IL-2 Sturmovik
- Platforms: PlayStation 3; Xbox 360; Nintendo DS; PlayStation Portable; Windows
- Release: September 4, 2009: PlayStation 3, Xbox 360; EU: September 4, 2009; NA: September 8, 2009; AU: September 9, 2009 Nintendo DS, PlayStation Portable; EU: September 4, 2009; AU: September 9, 2009 (DS); NA: September 15, 2009; AU: September 17, 2009 (PSP) Windows; WW: December 25, 2009 (Note: Retail versions were released in North America on March 16, 2010 and in the United Kingdom on April 30, 2010.)
- Genre: Combat flight simulator
- Modes: Single-player, multiplayer

IL-2 Sturmovik: Birds of Prey (Russian: Ил-2 Штурмовик: Крылатые хищники), or Wings of Prey on Windows, is a 2009 combat flight simulation video game. As in previous installments in the IL-2 Sturmovik series, it depicts combat aircraft from World War II, although with less focus on realistic simulation than other entries in the series. The game has a campaign mode in which players are able to fly the Allies against the Axis, and also a multiplayer mode in which they are able to select either faction.

Birds of Prey is based around the large-scale aerial combat and ground military operations of World War II. Players can participate in some of the war's most famous battles, piloting fighters, attack aircraft and heavy bombers across a range of missions. There are six theatres of war to engage in: Battle of Britain, Stalingrad, Berlin, Sicily, Korsun and the Battle of the Bulge, representing the main airborne battles of World War II in Europe.

Birds of Prey has a new damage effects engine. Players can see real-time damage to the aircraft such as holes in the wings and trail lines during dog fights. IL-2 Sturmovik: Birds of Prey features hundreds of aircraft taking part in air battles. The environmental engine also produces high-detail, realistic landscapes that allow players to easily see ground support actions.

The game was developed by Gaijin Entertainment, who subsequently developed Birds of Steel, also exclusively for consoles. Birds of Steel shares many traits with Birds of Prey (including HUD, aircraft models, controls, and menu design) but differentiates itself by concentrating primarily on US–Japanese aerial battles of the Pacific theater.

== Reception ==
Reception

Aggregate scores
Aggregator	Score
GameRankings	(X360) 80.71% (PS3) 79.82% (PC) 79.55% (PSP) 60% (DS) 42.25%
Metacritic	(PS3) 81/100 (X360) 80/100 (PC) 78/100 (PSP) 63/100 (DS) 41/100

Review scores
Publication	Score
Edge	8/10
Eurogamer	7/10
GameSpot	7.5/10
GameTrailers	8/10
GameZone	8.9/10
IGN	8.6/10 (X360, UK) 8.4/10 (PC) 8.3/10 (PSP) 6.8/10 (DS) 3.5/10
Nintendo Power	4/10
Official Xbox Magazine (US)	8/10
PC Gamer (UK)	78%
PlayStation: The Official Magazine	(PS3) 3.5/5 (PSP) 3/5

On the release, home console and Windows versions were met with positive reception, while versions for portable consoles received mixed to negative critical reception. GameRankings and Metacritic gave it 80.71% and 80 out of 100 for the Xbox 360 version; 79.82% and 81 out of 100 for the PlayStation 3 version; 79.55% and 78 out of 100 for the Windows version; 60% and 63 out of 100 for the PSP version; and 42.25% and 41 out of 100 for the DS version.
