= X-Plane (simulator) =

Flight simulator produced by Laminar Research

- Logo of the latest version
- Genre: Flight simulation
- Developers: Laminar Research; Austin Meyer
- Publishers: Laminar Research; Aerosoft
- Creator: Austin Meyer
- Platforms: Android iOS; Linux macOS; WebOS; Windows
- First release: X-Plane 1.00; 1995; 31 years ago
- Latest release: X-Plane 12.4.4 Release 1 September 10, 2026; 54 days ago

X-Plane is a flight simulator developed by Laminar Research. The desktop versions are available for macOS, Windows, and Linux. The simulator models the flight characteristics and operation of aircraft and includes features such as weather, navigation, scenery, and air traffic. It also supports user-created aircraft and custom scenery, as well as plug-ins and other add-ons. X-Plane can be used as part of FAA-approved flight-training systems when combined with appropriate hardware and controls.

== Professional and research use ==
X-Plane has been incorporated into aviation training devices. In 2025, the Aircraft Owners and Pilots Association reported on the use of X-Plane 12 flight simulation in an FAA-approved basic aviation training device, allowing students to log simulator hours at more than 14,000 airports.

X-Plane has also been used in aircraft design and research. In 2022, Beta Technologies used X-Plane to test their eVTOL designs, including the Alia eVTOL while its vertical-lift capability and transition to horizontal flight were being developed.

Academic research has used X-Plane in co-simulation with MATLAB/Simulink for virtual flight testing and the evaluation of flight-control systems. A 2022 study demonstrated successful virtual flight tests using X-Plane and Simulink, with simultaneous tracking of altitude and speed reference changes while maintaining roll stability under varying wind conditions.

== Technology ==
X-Plane uses a flight model based on blade element theory, in which an aircraft's wings, control surfaces, and propellers are divided into smaller elements and the aerodynamic forces acting on those elements are calculated to determine the aircraft's motion.

The flight model uses aircraft geometry and other physical parameters to calculate the aircraft's flight behavior rather than relying solely on predefined flight-performance tables. In a comparison of X-Plane 12 and Microsoft Flight Simulator (2020), Plane & Pilot described X-Plane's simulation of slow flight and minimum controllable airspeed as "extremely realistic and accurate" and praised its modeling of spins, spin recovery, and failures. Properly calibrated hardware including rudder pedals and separate throttle and trim controls that have soft response curves near the center are important for perceived realism. X-Plane's aircraft-development tools allow users to define aircraft geometry and aerodynamic characteristics and test the resulting aircraft within the simulator.

X-Plane also models environmental conditions including wind, turbulence, precipitation, clouds and other weather phenomena. It can download real-world weather information from the internet to reproduce weather conditions in the simulator.

The simulator supports third-party aircraft, scenery and plug-ins. Its developer documentation provides information on creating aircraft and scenery, developing weather-related functionality, and building plug-ins and other extensions.

== Flight Operations ==
X-Plane allows users to conduct simulated flights from initial aircraft preparation through departure, en-route navigation, and arrival. Flights can begin with engines running or in a cold and dark state, in which the aircraft is parked with its engines shut down and its electrical systems switched off. A cold-and-dark start may involve establishing electrical power, configuring fuel and other systems, programming the flight management computer (FMC) or global positioning system (GPS), starting the engines, and completing after-start checks. The procedures and available systems vary by aircraft model and add-on.

=== Flight planning ===
Flight plans can be created using external flight-planning tools and imported into X-Plane. SimBrief is a web-based flight-planning service for flight simulation that generates operational flight plans containing information such as routes, fuel requirements and weather. Its plans can be downloaded and imported into compatible FMCs or the default X-Plane GPS in many airplanes. Some aircraft also support direct integration with Simbrief. Other applications, including Little Navmap, can export flight plans for use with compatible aircraft.

=== Air traffic control ===
X-Plane 12 includes a built-in air traffic control (ATC) system that provides simulated communications with controllers for departure, en-route, and arrival phases of flight, with support for instrument flight rules (IFR) and visual flight rules (VFR) operations. A November 2024 update (12.1.3) added standard instrument departures, standard terminal arrival routes, VFR departures, flight following, and joystick-button push-to-talk support.

X-Plane supports online ATC networks, including VATSIM and IVAO, through compatible software. These networks allow users to communicate with virtual air traffic controllers and other pilots in a shared online environment. AI-based ATC add-ons are also available, which allow users to communicate with AI-generated air traffic controllers using voice interaction.

=== Virtual Airlines ===
X-Plane pilots can fly for virtual airlines that recreate airline operations. Participants can undertake simulated airline routes for real-world carriers, log flight hours, and progress through pilot ranks.

Some virtual airlines use flight-tracking software to record and validate flights, while others arrange group flights and events through online ATC networks such as VATSIM and IVAO. Membership requirements and operating procedures vary between organizations.

== Add-ons, customization, and community involvement ==
X-Plane supports a third-party ecosystem of commercial and freeware aircraft, scenery packages, plugins, and utilities. These additions allow users to modify the aircraft available in the simulator, expand or replace parts of its virtual environment, and integrate external software and hardware. The ecosystem includes products developed by commercial simulation companies as well as projects maintained by individual enthusiasts and volunteer development teams. Laminar Research provides software development tools and documentation for creating aircraft, scenery, and plugins, while community websites and specialist flight simulation publications facilitate the distribution, discussion, and evaluation of third-party products.

=== Aircraft ===
Aircraft add-ons range from modifications of existing aircraft to independently developed models of general aviation aircraft, airliners, helicopters, and other flying machines. Available aircraft include older designs with analog instruments as well as modern airliners equipped with glass cockpits and fly-by-wire controls. Depending on the package, an aircraft may include a three-dimensional exterior model, a virtual cockpit, custom textures and liveries, sounds, simulated instruments, and systems that reproduce the operation of the real aircraft. More complex products may simulate flight-management computers, navigation equipment, electrical and hydraulic systems, engine behaviour, failures, and other aircraft-specific functions.

Aircraft can be created or modified using Plane Maker, an aircraft-design application distributed with X-Plane. The program allows users to specify aircraft geometry and configure components and other characteristics within the simulator's aircraft-design framework. Additional development tools can be used to produce exterior models, cockpit artwork, sounds, and custom systems. User-created aircraft may be shared with other users or distributed commercially.

Freeware aircraft are also part of the simulator's add-on ecosystem. One example is the Zibo 737, a community-developed modification of the Boeing 737-800 supplied with the simulator. The project expands the aircraft's simulated systems and cockpit functionality. In a 2025 comparison of simulated Boeing 737s, Flying magazine identified the Zibo 737 as a leading study-level option for X-Plane, citing its flight-management computer, systems simulation, and sounds.

=== Scenery ===
The Airport Scenery Gateway is a community project through which users can create and submit airport scenery for potential inclusion in subsequent simulator releases. This allows community-created airport improvements to become part of the standard scenery installation rather than requiring users to download or pay for each airport as a separate add-on. The Gateway was introduced in 2014 and now contains over 38,000 airports.

Another freeware scenery project is simHeaven's X-WORLD, a collection of regional scenery packages for X-Plane 12. The packages cover Europe, the Americas, Africa, Asia, Australia and Oceania, and Antarctica. They use geographical data, including information from OpenStreetMap and building-footprint datasets, to place buildings and other environmental objects across large areas. The packages supplement the simulator's existing terrain and scenery rather than replace its underlying global terrain system.

Photographic scenery, often called orthophoto scenery, uses satellite imagery to represent the ground. Free tools for generating or incorporating photographic scenery include Ortho4XP, AutoOrtho, and Map Enhancement. The approach can require substantial storage and processing resources, and the resulting scenery depends on the available imagery and elevation data.

Scenery packages may also depend on shared libraries of buildings, vegetation, airport equipment, and other objects. Users may need to install additional scenery libraries or arrange scenery packages in a particular loading order. These dependencies, together with differences in geographical coverage and compatibility between simulator versions, are considerations when combining scenery developed by different authors.

=== Plugins and utilities ===
Plugins extend the simulator's functions beyond those provided by its default interface. Laminar Research provides a software development kit (SDK) through which developers can interact with simulator data and create additional functionality. Plugins can provide custom instruments and cockpit interfaces, communicate with external applications, supply flight-planning or navigation tools, and connect the simulator to specialized equipment.

Third-party utilities include additional cockpit displays and electronic flight bags, as well as tools for pushback, weather information, navigation data, aircraft configuration, and simulator-resource management. Some operate within X-Plane, while others communicate with separate applications or devices.

== Development and history ==
Release timeline Major desktop versions of X-Plane
1995	X-Plane 1.0
1996	X-Plane 2.0
1997	X-Plane 3.0
1998	X-Plane 4.0
1999	X-Plane 5.0
2000
2001	X-Plane 6.0
2002
2003	X-Plane 7.0
2004	X-Plane 8.0
2005
2006
2007
2008	X-Plane 9.0
2009
2010
2011
2012
2013
2014	X-Plane 10
2015
2016
2017	X-Plane 11
2018
2019
2020
2021
2022	X-Plane 12

X-Plane was developed by Austin Meyer and began in 1995 as a flight simulator called Archer-II IFR. Meyer initially developed the simulator to model the Piper Archer and later expanded it during his aerospace engineering studies to allow different aircraft to be simulated from their physical specifications. The program was subsequently renamed X-Plane.

The simulator has been developed through successive major versions, with Laminar Research continuing to revise its aircraft, scenery, flight model, weather, and other systems. X-Plane 10 was released for macOS, Windows, and Linux in 2011, while X-Plane 11 introduced a new user interface, updated aircraft, global scenery, lighting and weather effects, and changes to the rendering system.

Development of X-Plane 12 included alpha testing beginning in December 2021, followed by Early Access in September 2022. The full release followed in December 2022 and introduced changes to the flight model, weather, lighting, aircraft, air traffic control, avionics, and global scenery.

X-Plane 12.3, released in July 2025, introduced a new weather-radar system for supported aircraft. The system models radar returns from precipitation and includes features such as antenna tilt, multiple scanning modes, ground-clutter suppression, predictive windshear, and a developer API for custom aircraft implementations.

Subsequent X-Plane 12.4 updates continued development of weather and avionics systems. Version 12.4.1 added a weather-radar overlay to the X1000 multifunction display and further refined real-world weather simulation. Later 12.4 development continued to refine weather-radar functionality and presentation.

== Reception ==
Screenshot of X-Plane 12.00: Van's RV-10 at Appleton International Airport out of the box

In a review of version 5.11, Inside Mac Games praised the simulator's options but criticized its lack of polish. Reviewing the same version, Macworld stated that its features were close to those of FAA-approved simulators. PC Gamer called version 5.43 the "current standard-bearer for flight model realism in a commercial simulation", with physics incorporating blade element theory. Multiplayer.it noted that the professional version of version 12 is certified by the FAA, and that X-Plane is made for serious flight simulator enthusiasts.

== See also ==
- List of flight simulator video games
