= Bonus stage =

Video game concept

A bonus stage (also known as a bonus level, bonus round, or special stage) is a special video game level that awards the player a rapid windfall of benefits such as points, items, or money. The first bonus stage in video game history is in Rally-X, released by Namco in 1980. This became a signature feature of other arcade games like Galaga in 1981 and Joust in 1982.

Many bonus stages may need to be activated or discovered, or they may appear after a certain number of regular stages.

Bonus stages typically share several common characteristics: they are optional and not required to complete the main game; they often feature gameplay mechanics that differ from the main game; and they rarely punish players with death or loss of progress for failing. These stages eliminate the normal threat of enemies or hazards, in favor of reward. They generally reward players with collectibles, extra lives, or other benefits, and access is commonly gained through collecting specific items, reaching score thresholds, or finding hidden entrances. Examples include the Special Stages in Sonic the Hedgehog where players collect Chaos Emeralds, Street Fighter II's car-smashing bonus rounds, and the Bonus Barrels in Donkey Kong Country. In Crash Bandicoot, the bonus stages provide save points.

Bonus stages serve important game design functions. They provide pacing and variety by breaking up the rhythm of the main game, they allow players to practice specific skills in a low-risk environment, and they implement "risk vs. reward" design by placing valuable collectibles in potentially dangerous locations. Traditional bonus stages are popular in arcade and early console games of the 8-bit and 16-bit eras, but are less prevalent in modern games, which tend to focus more on complex cinematic stories rather than item collection and point accumulation.
