= IL-2 Sturmovik: Forgotten Battles =

2003 video game

- Developer: 1C: Maddox Games
- Publishers: 1C, Ubi Soft
- Platform: Microsoft Windows
- Release: NA: March 4, 2003; PAL: March 21, 2003
- Genre: Combat flight simulator
- Modes: Single-player, multiplayer

IL-2 Sturmovik: Forgotten Battles (Russian: Ил-2 Штурмовик: Забытые сражения), also known in Europe as Rebirth of Honor, is a combat flight simulator video game, and sequel to the 2001 combat flight simulation of the year IL-2 Sturmovik developed by the Russian software firm 1C. Unlike the first installment, Forgotten Battles focuses on the Soviet-Finnish Continuation War of 1941-1944.

== Career Mode ==
The Career mode allows the player to become a pilot of the Luftwaffe, Soviet Air Force, Finnish Air Force, or the Hungarian Air Force. Each campaign consists of approximately 30 missions, and a career includes 4-8 campaigns or 100 to 250 missions. As a new feature in the IL-2 Sturmovik series of flight simulation games, IL-2 Sturmovik: Forgotten Battles introduced the dynamic campaign mode which had been static until then.

== Aircraft ==
The game features 129 flyable aircraft, all of which are available as AI controlled elements in missions. 80 of these planes can be flown by the player. 30 of the flyable planes and 21 of the AI planes were new in the series. The flyable aircraft have a full 3D cockpit with working instruments. Planes with crew allow switching to most positions.

== Expansions ==
=== Ace Expansion Pack ===
Released on 2 March 2004, 1C: Maddox Games and Ubisoft released the official expansion pack entitled IL-2 Sturmovik: Forgotten Battles - Ace Expansion Pack. It offers players a more in depth simulation experience by allowing them to take control of 11 new aircraft, and fight against or beside 10 non-flyable aircraft. It also includes 2 new maps, one depicting the Finnish Front, and a Hungarian map which includes the Balaton Lake area. Both a Finnish and Hungarian campaign which uses these maps are also playable and allows the player to progress in rank and earn awards.

=== Gold Pack ===
IL-2 Sturmovik: Forgotten Battles - Gold Pack was simultaneously released with the Ace Expansion Pack. The Gold Pack consisted in a software reuniting all the content shared between Forgotten Battles and the Ace Expansion Pack. This allowed customers possessing no game in the series to purchase the latest version of IL-2 Sturmovik reunited in only one standalone game.

== Reception ==
=== Forgotten Battles ===
IL-2 Sturmovik: Forgotten Battles

Aggregate scores
Aggregator	Score
GameRankings	87.39%
Metacritic	86/100

Review scores
Publication	Score
GameSpot	8.6/10
GameSpy	4/5
IGN	8.5/10
PC Gamer (UK)	90%
PC Gamer (US)	92%
PC Zone	92%
X-Play	3/5

Forgotten Battles was met with positive reception; GameRankings gave it a score of 87.39%, while Metacritic gave it 86 out of 100.

Forgotten Battles won PC Gamer US's 2003 "Best Simulation" award. The magazine's Andy Mahood opined that "WWII flight sims don't get any better." The editors of Computer Gaming World nominated Forgotten Battles for their 2003 "Flight Simulation of the Year" award, which ultimately went to Flight Simulator 2004: A Century of Flight. It was a runner-up for GameSpot's 2004 "Best Expansion Pack" award, but lost to Rise of Nations: Thrones and Patriots. During the 7th Annual Interactive Achievement Awards, the Academy of Interactive Arts & Sciences nominated Forgotten Battles for Computer Simulation Game of the Year, but lost to The Sims: Superstar.

=== Forgotten Battles - Ace Expansion Pack ===
IL-2 Sturmovik: Forgotten Battles - Ace

Aggregate scores
Aggregator	Score
GameRankings	82.57%
Metacritic	85/100

Review scores
Publication	Score
GameSpot	8.5/10
GameZone	8/10
IGN	8.4/10
PC Gamer (UK)	81%
PC Gamer (US)	90%
PC Zone	68%

The Ace Expansion Pack was also met with positive reception; GameRankings gave it a score of 82.57%, while Metacritic gave it 85 out of 100.
