= Rise of Flight: The First Great Air War =

- Developers: Neoqb, 777 Studios
- Publishers: 777 Studios, Aerosoft, ND Games
- Engine: Digital Nature
- Platform: Microsoft Windows
- Release: RU: May 7, 2009; NA: June 29, 2009; EU: July 31, 2009
- Genres: Flight simulator, Combat flight simulator
- Modes: Single-player, multiplayer

Rise of Flight: The First Great Air War (Russian: Война в небе – 1917) is a World War I combat flight simulation video game by Russian developer 777 Studios and released on May 7, 2009.

== Development ==
Rise of Flight premiered at Games Convention 2008 in Leipzig, and at CIS Igromir 2008. Closed beta testing of the game began in April 2008. On May 7, 2009, Rise of Flight was officially released in Russia with Russian publisher ND Games. In the US, Rise of Flight: The First Great Air War was premiered at the 2009 E3 and was officially released on June 25, 2009 in the US by its publisher 777 Studios. Aerosoft gained publishing rights in Europe, with the game also being offered for download from Direct2Drive. In June 2010, 777 Studios acquired the rights to the Rise of Flight brand.

In 2017, IL-2 Sturmovik: Flying Circus, the spiritual successor of Rise of Flight, was announced by 1C Game Studios, a studio which emerged from a partnership with 777 Studios. The first volume was released in 2019. Two additional volumes have been released since and one more volume is currently under development.

== Reception ==
Reception

Review scores
Publication	Score
IGN	7.9
GameStar	77

=== Accolades ===
Rise of Flight: The First Great Air War won the award for "Judges' Choice" at Intel Level Up 2009.
