= IL-2 Sturmovik: 1946 =

2006 video game

- Cover of the double DVD box set compilation
- Developer: 1C:Maddox Games
- Publisher: Ubisoft
- Platform: Microsoft Windows
- Release: EU: 8 December 2006; NA: 13 March 2007
- Genre: Combat flight simulator

IL-2 Sturmovik: 1946 (Russian: Ил-2 Штурмовик: Платиновая коллекция), also called IL-2: 1946) is both the title of an add-on and a compilation release of the combat flight simulation game IL-2 Sturmovik. In that latter case, it is sometimes called IL-2 Sturmovik: Complete Edition. Created by the Russian games developer 1C:Maddox Games and published by Ubisoft, IL-2 Sturmovik: 1946 takes place during World War II. The add-on from which the compilation takes the name 1946 was released in December 2006 as downloadable content (DLC) only, same as Sturmoviks over Manchuria (DLC in December 2006) and Pe-2. That latter was an add-on already released at the time (as DLC too), it was on sale since the month of May. The compilation IL-2 Sturmovik: 1946 was published in December 2006 in double DVD format, one DVD for the software and a second DVD for bonuses.

== Add-on ==
The 1946 add-on was released in 2006 and assumed a fictional basis: World War II still rages in an alternate year of 1946 and aircraft like the He Lerche or the FW Ta 183 have become flyable operational aircraft.

== Compilation ==
The IL-2 Sturmovik: 1946 compilation DVD came with all of the updates and expansions of the base game before it, up to version 4.07. Ubisoft released the pack in stores in December 2006 in Europe and Australia; North American release was on 13 March 2007. In addition to all of the above games, it includes the three new add-ons released in 2006: Pe-2 (already released in May 2006 as online downloadable content) and the two add-ons newly included in the package: Sturmoviks over Manchuria and 46, adding new missions, planes, and maps to the game.

== Reception ==
Reception

Aggregate scores
Aggregator	Score
GameRankings	85.38%
Metacritic	86/100

Review scores
Publication	Score
1Up.com	A+
GamesRadar+	4.5/5
IGN	(UK) 8.6/10 (US) 8.1/10
PALGN	8/10
PC Format	83%
PC Gamer (UK)	91%
PC Gamer (US)	80%
PC Zone	78%

The game was met with positive reception upon release. Review aggregator Metacritic gave IL-2 Sturmovik: 1946 a score of 86 out of 100, while another review aggregator, GameRankings, gave it 85.38%.
