= Index of DOS games (M) =

This is an index of DOS games.

This list has been split into multiple pages. Please use the Table of Contents to browse it.

Title	Released	Developer(s)	Publisher(s)
M1 Tank Platoon	1989	Microprose	Microprose
Maabus	1995	Microforum International	Monolith Productions
Macadam Bumper	1987	ERE Informatique	ERE Informatique
Mach 3	1987	Loriciels	Loriciels
Machiavelli the Prince	1995	Holistic Design	MicroProse
Mad Dog McCree	1993	American Laser Games, IBM	IBM
Mad Dog II: The Lost Gold	1994	American Laser Games	American Laser Games
Mad TV	1991	Rainbow Arts Software	Rainbow Arts Software
Maelstrom	1994	Ambrosia Software	Ambrosia Software
Magic Boy	1993	Blue Turtle	Empire Interactive
Magic Candle, The	1989	Mindcraft Software	Mindcraft Software
Magic Candle II, The	1991	Mindcraft Software	Electronic Arts
Magic Candle III, The	1992	Mindcraft Software	Mindcraft Software
Magic Carpet	1994	Bullfrog Productions	Electronic Arts
Magic Carpet: Hidden Worlds	1995	Bullfrog Productions	Electronic Arts
Magic Carpet 2: The Netherworlds	1995	Bullfrog Productions	Electronic Arts
Magicland Dizzy	1991	Magicland Dizzy	Magicland Dizzy
Magic Pockets	1991	Bitmap Brothers	Renegade Software
Major League Manager	1986	Spinnaker Software Corporation	Spinnaker Software Corporation
Major Stryker	1993	Apogee Software	Apogee Software
Malice	1997	Ratloop	Quantum Axcess
Manchester United	1990	Krisalis Software	Krisalis Software
Manchester United Europe	1991	Krisalis Software	Krisalis Software
Manchester United Premier League Champions	1994	Krisalis Software	Krisalis Software
Manchester United: The Double	1995	Krisalis Software	Krisalis Software
Manhole, The	1989	Cyan Worlds	Broderbund, Activision
Manhole: New and Enhanced	1992	Cyan Worlds	Activision
Manhunter: New York	1988	Evryware	Sierra Entertainment
Manhunter 2: San Francisco	1989	Evryware	Sierra Entertainment
Maniac Mansion	1987	Lucasfilm Games	Lucasfilm Games
Manic Karts	1995	Manic Media Productions	Virgin Interactive Entertainment
Manic Miner	1997	Alchemist Research	Alchemist Research
Marble Madness	1986	W.Harvey, J.Nitchals	Electronic Arts
Mario is Missing!	1992	Software Toolworks	Software Toolworks
Mario's Early Years: Fun With Letters	1993	Software Toolworks	Software Toolworks
Mario's Early Years: Fun With Numbers	1993	Software Toolworks	Software Toolworks
Mario's Early Years: Preschool Fun	1993	Software Toolworks	Software Toolworks
Mario's Game Gallery	1995	Presage Software	Interplay Entertainment
Mario Teaches Typing	1991	Interplay Entertainment	Interplay Entertainment
Mars Saga	1988	Westwood Studios	Electronic Arts
Martian Memorandum	1991	Access Software	Access Software
Mass Destruction	1997	NMS Software	BMG Interactive
Masterblazer	1991	Rainbow Arts	LucasArts
Master Levels for Doom II	1995	id Software	GT Interactive
Master Miner	1983	Funtastic	Funtastic
Master of Magic	1994	Simtex	Microprose
Master of Orion	1993	Simtex	MicroProse
Master of Orion II: Battle at Antares	1996	Simtex	MicroProse
Masterblazer	1990	Rainbow Arts	LucasArts
Math Blaster	1986	Davidson & Associates	Davidson & Associates
Math Blaster Plus!	1987	Davidson & Associates	Davidson & Associates
Math Rabbit	1986	The Learning Company	The Learning Company
Math Rabbit Classic	1993	The Learning Company	The Learning Company
Math Rescue	1992	Redwood Games	Apogee Software
Maupiti Island	1990	Lankhor	Lankhor
M.A.X.: Mechanized Assault and Exploration	1996	Interplay Entertainment	Interplay Entertainment
M.C. Kids	1992	Arc Developments	Virgin Games
MDK	1997	Shiny Entertainment	Shiny Entertainment
Mean 18	1986	Microsmiths	Accolade
Mean Streets	1989	Access Software	Access Software
Mech Brigade	1987	Strategic Simulations	Strategic Simulations
MechWarrior	1989	Dynamix	Activision
MechWarrior 2: 31st Century Combat	1995	Activision	Activision
MechWarrior 2: Ghost Bear's Legacy	1995	Activision	Activision
MechWarrior 2: Mercenaries	1996	Activision	Activision
Medieval Warriors	1991	Merit Software	Merit Software
Megafortress	1991	Artech Digital Entertainment	Three-Sixth Pacific
Mega lo Mania	1991	Virgin Interactive	Sensible Software
Mega Man	1990		Hi-Tech Expressions
Mega Man 3: The Robots are Revolting	1992		Hi-Tech Expressions
Mega Man X	1995	Rozner Labs	Capcom
MegaRace	1994	Software Toolworks	Cryo Interactive
MegaRace 2	1996	Cryo Interactive	Mindscape
MegaTraveller 1: The Zhodani Conspiracy	1990	Paragon Software	Paragon Software
MegaTraveller 2: Quest for the Ancients	1991	Paragon Software	Paragon Software
Menace	1988	DMA Design	Psygnosis
Menzoberranzan	1994	DreamForge Intertainment	Strategic Simulations
Merchant Prince	1993	Quantum Quality Productions	Several Dudes Holistic Gaming
Metal Gear	1990	Banana Development Corporation	Ultra Software Corporation
Metal Mutant	1991	Silmarils	Silmarils
Metaltech: Battledrome	1995	Dynamix	Sierra On-Line
Metaltech: Earthsiege	1994	Dynamix	Sierra On-Line
Michael Jordan in Flight	1993	Electronic Arts	Dro Soft
Mickey's Space Adventure	1986	Al Lowe	Sierra Entertainment
Microcosm	1994	Creative Assembly,	Psygnosis
MicroLeague Baseball	1984	MicroLeague	MicroLeague
Micro Machines	1994	Codemasters	Codemasters
Micro Machines 2: Turbo Tournament	1995	Codemasters	Supersonic Software
Microsoft Adventure	1981	Microsoft	IBM
Microsoft Decathlon	1982	Microsoft	IBM
Microsoft Flight Simulator 1.0	1982	subLOGIC	Microsoft
Microsoft Flight Simulator 2.0	1984	subLOGIC	Microsoft
Microsoft Flight Simulator 3.0	1988	subLOGIC	Microsoft
Microsoft Flight Simulator 4.0	1989	Bruce Artwick Organization	Microsoft
Microsoft Flight Simulator Aircraft & Scenery Designer	1990	Bruce Artwick Organization	Microsoft
Microsoft Flight Simulator 5.0	1993	Microsoft	Microsoft
Microsoft Space Simulator	1994	Bruce Artwick Organization	Microsoft
Midnight Rescue!	1989	The Learning Company	The Learning Company
Midway Campaign	1983	Microcomputer Games	Avalon Hill
Midwinter	1990	Maelstrom Games	Rainbird Software
MiG-29: Deadly Adversary of Falcon 3.0	1993	Spectrum Holobyte	Spectrum Holobyte
MiG-29 Fulcrum	1990	Simis	Domark
Might and Magic Book One: The Secret of the Inner Sanctum	1987	New World Computing	New World Computing
Might and Magic II: Gates to Another World	1988	New World Computing	New World Computing
Might and Magic III: Isles of Terra	1991	New World Computing	New World Computing
Might and Magic IV: Clouds of Xeen	1992	New World Computing	New World Computing
Might and Magic V: Darkside of Xeen	1993	New World Computing	New World Computing
Might and Magic: World of Xeen	1994	New World Computing	New World Computing
Might and Magic Trilogy	1993	New World Computing	Softgold Computerspiele
Might and Magic Sixpack	1998	New World Computing	Ubisoft
Mighty Bombjack	1990	Elite Systems	Elite Systems
Millennia: Altered Destinies	1995	Take 2 Interactive	Take 2 Interactive
Millennium: Return to Earth	1989	Electric Dreams	Ian Bird
Mindfighter	1988	Abstract Concepts	Activision
Mindshadow	1984	Interplay Entertainment	Activision
Miner 2049er	1983	Big Five Software	Micro Fun
Miracle Piano Teaching System	1990	Software Toolworks	Software Toolworks
Mission Critical	1995	Legend Entertainment	Legend Entertainment
Mission: Impossible 2	1988	Novotrade	Epyx
Mixed-Up Fairy Tales	1991	Sierra On-Line	Sierra On-Line
Mixed-Up Mother Goose	1987	Sierra On-Line	Sierra On-Line
Mixed-Up Mother Goose (Enhanced CD-ROM Version)	1996	Sierra On-Line	Sierra On-Line
Modem Wars	1988	Ozark Softscape	Electronic Arts
Moebius: The Orb of Celestial Harmony	1985	Origin Systems	Broderbund
MoleZ	1997	FRACTiLE Games	FRACTiLE Games
Monkey Island 2: LeChuck's Revenge	1991	Lucasfilm Games	Lucasfilm Games
Monster Bash	1993	Apogee Software	Apogee Software
Montezuma's Revenge	1984	Utopia Software	Parker Brothers
Montezuma's Return	1997	Utopia Technologies	Software 2000, WizardWorks
Monuments of Mars	1991	Scenario Software	Apogee Software
Moonbugs	1983	Windmill Software	Windmill Software
Moonmist	1986	Infocom	Infocom
Moon Patrol	1983	Atari	Atarisoft
Moonstone: A Hard Days Knight	1991	Mindscape	Mindscape
Moonwalker	1989	Emerald Software	U.S. Gold
Moraff's Revenge	1988	Moraffware	Moraffware
Mortal Coil: Adrenalin Intelligence	1995	Crush Software	Virgin Interactive
Mortal Kombat	1993	Sumac	Acclaim Entertainment
Mortal Kombat II	1994	Probe Software	Acclaim Entertainment
Mortal Kombat 3	1995	Williams Entertainment	GT Interactive
Mortal Kombat Trilogy	1997	Point of View, Inc.	Midway Games & GT Interactive
Mortville Manor	1987	Lankhor	Lankhor
Mr. Boom	1999	Remdy Software	Remdy Software
Ms. Pac-Man	1983	Quality Software	Atarisoft
Muggins	1991	Scott Young	
Mundial de Fútbol	1990	Opera Soft	Opera Soft
Muppet Adventure: Chaos at the Carnival	1989	Micromosaics	Hi-Tech Expressions
Murder on the Zinderneuf	1984	Free Fall Associates	Electronic Arts
Museum Madness	1994	Novotrade	MECC
Muzzle Velocity	1996	Code Fusion	Digi4fun
Mystic Midway: Rest in Pieces	1994	Philips Interactive Media	Philips Interactive Media
Mystic Towers	1994	Animation F/X	Manaccom, Apogee Software
Myth	1989	Magnetic Scrolls	Rainbird
