= Hi Tech Expressions =

American video game publisher

- Formerly: Thoughtware Expressions (1986)
- Founded: 1986; 40 years ago in New York, USA
- Founder: Henry Kaplan
- Defunct: 1995
- Headquarters: 584 Broadway, New York City, New York, United States
- Products: Software

Hi Tech Expressions (formerly Thoughtware Expressions, later Hi Tech Entertainment) was an American video game publisher headquartered in Lower Manhattan, New York City. The company was founded in 1986 by Henry Kaplan. It was formed as a subsidiary of Thoughtware, Inc. and made licensed games from various properties including Sesame Street, Barbie, and Tom and Jerry.

Hi Tech Expressions was one of the largest American companies to publish games for the Nintendo Entertainment System. At peak, it was the second-largest American game publisher for home consoles behind Acclaim.

In 1994, the company was renamed to Hi Tech Entertainment before going out of business in 1995. The former executives would go on to form a successor company called NewKidCo.

== History ==
=== Software and early years ===
Hi-Tech Expression was originally opened in 1986 as a subsidiary of Thoughtware, Inc. under the leadership of Henry Kaplan. Before making games, the company made software for occasions on the computer and made printouts. Which were:

- PartyWare: Design for Card and Party Kit with Database of Friends and Events.
- CardWare: Design for Animated Birthday Greeting Disk and Card Maker.
- HeartWare: Design for Animated Friendship Greeting Disk and Love Note.
- JingleDisk: Design for Holiday Card and Animated Greeting Disk.

Additionally, there was a designer:

- WareWithAll: Designer for paper, envelopes, stickers, markers, disks, and disk labels.
- PrinterPaper: Designer for Greeting Cards, Banners, Letters, and Computer Creations. There is either an Assortment Pack or a Holiday Pack.

The address was originally in Coconut Grove, Florida, but later moved to Plantation, Florida in 1987, and then to New York City, New York.

It was initially formed in Florida as Thoughtware, then later launching a New York subsidiary Thoughtware Expressions as a subsidiary of Thoughtware, Inc., before becoming Hi Tech Expressions in October 1986. The company initially operated as an educational software publisher, before becoming a mainstream publisher. The company later expanded beyond software in 1987, by acquiring the game licensing rights of the Sesame Street franchise and the rights to its computer games from Children's Television Workshop.

=== Expansion ===
During its peak, the company became a Nintendo license in 1988, making console games with the Sesame Street license, eventually expanding beyond computers. Billy Pidgeon was hired to run the video game division, while Asif Chaudhri was hired to run the computer game division. Chaudhri later moved to the video game division after Pidgeon left.

Its expansion grew rapidly by acquiring big name licenses, like Chessmaster. The company later introduced the Print Kit program in the late 1980s. The company grew steadily with the Sesame Street Print Writer program, which was a word processing program for preschoolers. In 1990, the company expanded when the company produced a game Big Bird's Hide and Speak, a game that mainly featured extensive use of digitized speech for the NES.

In 1991, the company acquired the licensing rights to the Barbie dolls from Mattel. The company also acquired the rights to the Tom and Jerry franchise from Turner Entertainment Co. to make video games.

During its peak, the company became the second-largest American game publisher of console games behind Acclaim Entertainment but above the established giants Mindscape and THQ. In 1993, the company along with Riedel Software Productions continued their long-standing partnership, working on a Super NES version of Beethoven's 2nd. Also that year, the company signed deals with Acclaim Entertainment and Virgin Interactive to distribute a home computer release of Mortal Kombat.

=== Rename and defunct ===
In early 1994, the company acquired the video game licenses of Bobby's World and Baby's Day Out from 20th Century Fox. In mid-1994, the company was renamed Hi Tech Entertainment, as conducted by Henry Kaplan before it went defunct in 1995 and signed deals with Capcom and Acclaim Entertainment before the name change.

After the company shuttered, Kaplan briefly went to Philips Interactive Media. In 1997, several former Hi Tech Expressions executives, including Henry Kaplan, formed NewKidCo as a spiritual successor to the company.

== List of games ==
| Title | Platforms | Developers | Years | Notes |
|---|---|---|---|---|
| Sesame Street: Astro-Grover | Commodore 64, MS-DOS, Apple II, Atari 8-bit | Children's Computer Workshop | 1987 | Originally released in 1984 by CBS Software |
| Sesame Street: Grover's Animal Adventures | Commodore 64, MS-DOS | Children's Computer Workshop | 1987 | Originally released in 1985 by CBS Software |
| Sesame Street: Pals Around the Town | Commodore 64, MS-DOS | Children's Computer Workshop | 1987 | |
| Sesame Street: Big Bird's Special Delivery | Commodore 64, MS-DOS, Apple II | Children's Computer Workshop | 1987 | Originally released in 1984 by CBS Software |
| Sesame Street: Ernie's Magic Shapes | Commodore 64, MS-DOS, Apple II | Children's Computer Workshop | 1987 | Originally released in 1984 by CBS Software |
| Sesame Street: Letter-Go-Round | Commodore 64, MS-DOS, Apple II | Children's Computer Workshop | 1988 | Originally released in 1984 by CBS Software |
| Bagasaurus | Commodore 64, MS-DOS, Apple II | Children's Computer Workshop | 1988 | |
| Matterhorn Screamer! | Commodore 64, MS-DOS, Apple II | Walt Disney Computer Software | 1988 | |
| The Chase on Tom Sawyer's Island | Commodore 64, MS-DOS, Apple II | Walt Disney Computer Software | 1988 | |
| Win, Lose or Draw | Commodore 64, MS-DOS, Apple II, NES | Softie (C64, MS-DOS, Apple II); Riedel Software Productions (NES) | 1988 (C64, MS-DOS, Apple II); 1990 (NES) | |
| Sesame Street: 1-2-3 | NES | Rare/Zippo Games | 1989 | |
| Sesame Street: A-B-C | NES | Rare/Zippo Games | 1989 | |
| Fun House | Commodore 64, MS-DOS, Apple II | MicroMosaics Productions | 1989 | |
| Win, Lose or Draw: Second Edition | Commodore 64, MS-DOS, Apple II | Softie | 1989 | |
| Win, Lose or Draw: Junior | Commodore 64, MS-DOS, Apple II | Softie | 1989 | |
| Muppet Adventure: Chaos at the Carnival | Commodore 64, MS-DOS, Apple II, NES | MicroMosaics Productions (C64, MS-DOS, Apple II); Mind's Eye Technology (NES) | 1989 (C64, MS-DOS, Apple II); 1990 (NES) | |
| Remote Control | Commodore 64, MS-DOS, Apple II, NES | Softie (C64, MS-DOS, Apple II); Riedel Software Productions (NES) | 1989 (C64, MS-DOS, Apple II); 1990 (NES) | |
| The Chessmaster | NES, Game Boy | The Software Toolworks | 1990 (NES); 1991 (GB) | |
| Orb-3D | NES | The Software Toolworks | 1990 | |
| Sesame Street: Big Bird's Hide and Speak | NES | Riedel Software Productions | 1990 | |
| The Bugs Bunny Hare-Brained Adventure | MS-DOS | Riedel Software Productions | 1990 | |
| Chip 'n Dale Rescue Rangers: The Adventures in Nimnul's Castle | MS-DOS | Riedel Software Productions | 1990 | |
| The Flintstones: Dino: Lost in Bedrock | MS-DOS | Softie | 1990 | |
| The Jetsons: By George, in Trouble Again | MS-DOS | Softie | 1990 | |
| Tom and Jerry: Yankee Doodle's CAT-astrophe | MS-DOS | Softie | 1990 | |
| The Second Kids' World Almanac Adventure | MS-DOS | Hi Tech Expressions | 1990 | |
| Roller Coaster Rumbler | MS-DOS | Subway Software | 1990 | Licensed from Tynesoft |
| Mega Man | MS-DOS | Rozner Labs | 1990 | while officially licensed by Capcom, this game is not related to its NES counterpart |
| The Bugs Bunny Cartoon Workshop | MS-DOS | Novotrade Software | 1990 | |
| Altered Space: A 3-D Alien Adventure | Game Boy | Software Creations | 1991 | European release |
| Arcade Blockbusters | MS-DOS | Pacific Dataworks International; Riggs International | 1991 | Compilation re-release of Ghosts 'n Goblins, Sarge and Pocket Rockets |
| Arcade Hits | MS-DOS | Pacific Dataworks International; Micro Talent; Interactive Designs | 1991 | Compilation re-release of Hyper Dyne Side Arms, Street Fighter and Cabal |
| Daffy Duck, P.I.: The Case of the Missing Letters | MS-DOS | Riedel Software Productions | 1991 | |
| Gremlins 2: The New Batch | MS-DOS | Riedel Software Productions | 1991 | |
| Adventures of Beetlejuice: Skeletons in the Closet | MS-DOS | Riedel Software Productions | 1991 | |
| Sesame Street Storybook #1: Me Look for Cookie | MS-DOS | Hi Tech Expressions | 1991 | |
| Ninja Gaiden | MS-DOS | Rozner Labs | 1991 | |
| Sesame Street: A-B-C/1-2-3 | NES | Rare/Zippo Games | 1991 | |
| Fun House | NES | Realtime Associates | 1991 | |
| Barbie | NES, MS-DOS | Imagineering (NES); Albino Frog Software (MS-DOS) | 1991 (NES); 1992 (MS-DOS) | |
| Tom and Jerry (and Tuffy) | NES, MS-DOS | Software Creations (NES); Albino Frog Software (MS-DOS) | 1991 (NES); 1993 (MS-DOS) | |
| The Hunt for Red October | NES, Game Boy, Super NES | Beam Software (NES, Game Boy); Riedel Software Productions (SNES) | 1991 (NES, Game Boy); 1993 (SNES) | |
| Sesame Street: Countdown | NES | Riedel Software Productions | 1992 | |
| Spooky Kooky Monster Maker | MS-DOS | Pelican Software | 1992 | |
| Mega Man 3 | MS-DOS | Rozner Labs | 1992 | while officially licensed by Capcom, this game is not related to its NES counterpart |
| Barbie Game Girl | Game Boy | Imagineering | 1992 | |
| Tom and Jerry | Game Boy | Beam Software | 1992 | |
| Mickey's Safari in Letterland | NES | Beam Software | 1993 | |
| Rollerblade Racer | NES, MS-DOS | Radiance Software (NES); Designer Software (NES); Tahoe Software Productions (MS-DOS) | 1993 | |
| Tom and Jerry | Super NES | Riedel Software Productions | 1993 | |
| Harley's Humongous Adventure | Super NES | Visual Concepts | 1993 | |
| We're Back! A Dinosaur's Story | Super NES | Visual Concepts | 1993 | |
| Where in the World is Carmen Sandiego? | Super NES | Electronic Arts Canada | 1993 | |
| Where in Time is Carmen Sandiego? | Super NES | Electronic Arts Canada | 1993 | |
| Beethoven: The Ultimate Canine Caper | Super NES, MS-DOS | Riedel Software Productions (SNES); Rozner Labs Software Group (MS-DOS) | 1993 | |
| Barbie: Super Model | Super NES, Sega Genesis, MS-DOS | Tahoe Software Productions | 1993 | |
| Street Fighter II | MS-DOS | Creative Materials | 1993 | |
| Tom and Jerry: Frantic Antics | Game Boy, Sega Genesis | Beam Software | 1993 | |
| We're Back! A Dinosaur's Story | Game Boy | Beam Software | 1993 | |
| The New Chessmaster | Game Boy | The Software Toolworks | 1993 | |
| Mickey's Adventures in Numberland | NES | Beam Software | 1994 | |
| Beethoven: The Ultimate Canine Caper | Game Boy | Unexpected Development | 1994 | European release; cancelled in North America |
| A Dinosaur's Tale | Sega Genesis | Funcom | 1994 | |
| Mickey's Ultimate Challenge | Super NES, Game Boy, Sega Genesis, Game Gear, Master System | Designer Software | 1994 | Master System version published by Tec Toy in Brazil |
| Barbie and Her Magical House | Windows, Mac | The Cute Company | 1994 | |

=== Cancelled ===
| Title | Platform | Developer | Notes |
|---|---|---|---|
| Twin Peaks | NES | N/A | |
| Baby's Day Out | Super NES, Sega Genesis, Game Boy | Designer Software | |
| Bobby's World | Super NES, Sega Genesis | Riedel Software Productions | |
| Bobby's World | Game Boy | Unexpected Development | Based on Home Alone 2: Kevin's Dream |
| Barbie: Vacation Adventure | Super NES, Sega Genesis | Software Creations | |
| Mickey's Playtown Adventure: A Day of Discovery | Super NES | Visual Concepts | |
| Tom vs. Jerry: The Chase is On! | Super NES | Software Creations | |
| NBA Jam | MS-DOS | Designer Software | |

== List of Software ==
| Title | Platform | Year | Notes |
|---|---|---|---|
| PartyWare | Commodore 64, MS-DOS, Apple II, Atari 8-bit | 1986 | originally published under Thoughtware and Thoughtware Expressions |
| CardWare | Commodore 64, MS-DOS, Apple II, Atari 8-bit | 1986 | originally published under Thoughtware and Thoughtware Expressions |
| HeartWare | Commodore 64, MS-DOS, Apple II, Atari 8-bit | 1986 | originally published under Thoughtware and Thoughtware Expressions |
| JingleDisk | Commodore 64, MS-DOS, Apple II, Atari 8-bit | 1986 | originally published under Thoughtware and Thoughtware Expressions |
| AwardWare | Commodore 64, MS-DOS, Apple II, Atari 8-bit | 1986 | originally published under Thoughtware and Thoughtware Expressions |
| PrintPower | Commodore 64, MS-DOS, Apple II, Atari 8-bit | 1987 | |
| Basic Skills | Commodore 64, MS-DOS, Apple II, Atari 8-bit | 1987 | |
| SwimWare | MS-DOS, Apple II | 1988 | |
| Sesame Street Print Kit | Commodore 64, MS-DOS, Apple II, Atari 8-bit | 1988 | |
| Muppets Print Kit | Commodore 64, MS-DOS, Apple II, Atari 8-bit | 1989 | |
| Looney Tunes Print Kit | Commodore 64, MS-DOS, Apple II, Atari 8-bit | 1989 | |
| Sesame Street First Writer | MS-DOS, Apple II | 1989 | |
| PrintPower Pro | MS-DOS | 1990 | |
| NFL Print Pro | MS-DOS | 1991 | |
| Barbie Design Studio | MS-DOS | 1991 | |
| Fairy Tale Factory | MS-DOS | 1992 | |
