= Mindbender =

Mindbender(s) or The Mindbender(s) may refer to:

== Film and television ==
- The Mind Benders (1963 film), a British thriller film
- The Mind-Benders (1967 film), an American antidrug documentary film
- Mindbender (film), a 1995 film about Uri Geller by Ken Russell
- Mindbenders (film), a 2004 American science fiction film
- "Mindbender" (UFO), a 1971 television episode
- "Mindbender" (X-Men: Evolution), a 2002 television episode
- MindBender, a prize contest on the TV series Daily Planet

== Literature ==
- The Mind Benders (novel), a 1963 novel by James Kennaway
- The Mind Benders (Vosper book), a 1971 book by Cyril Vosper
- Mindbenders: Stories to Warp Your Brain, a 2000 story collection by Neal Shusterman

== Music ==
- The Mindbenders, a 1960s English beat group
- "Mind Bender", a song by Stillwater, 1977
- "Mind Bender", a song by Trouble from Simple Mind Condition, 2007
- "Mindbender (Confusion's Prince)", a song by the Grateful Dead from The Golden Road (1965–1973), 2001

== Roller coasters ==
- Mindbender (Galaxyland), a roller coaster in Edmonton, Alberta, Canada
- Mind Bender (Six Flags Over Georgia), a roller coaster near Atlanta, Georgia, U.S.

== Other uses ==
- Doctor Mindbender, a fictional character from the G.I. Joe universe
- Mindbender (video game), a 1989 MS-DOS computer game
