= Tarnoff =

Tarnoff is a surname. Notable people with the surname include:

- John Tarnoff (born 1952), American literary agent, film producer, and career coach
- Peter Tarnoff (1937–2023), American diplomat
