= Ian Bird =

Ian Bird may refer to:

- Ian Bird (field hockey) (born 1970), Canadian Olympic field hockey player
- Ian Bird (software developer), British game programmer and game designer
