= Deuteros =

1991 video game

- Developer: Activision
- Publisher: Activision
- Designer: Ian Bird
- Composer: Matt Bates
- Platforms: Amiga, Atari ST
- Release: 1991
- Genre: Strategy
- Mode: Single player

Deuteros: The Next Millennium is the sequel to the sci-fi strategy video game Millennium 2.2, published by Activision for the Amiga and Atari ST. Ian Bird designed and wrote the game, with graphics by Jai Redman and music by Matt Bates.

== Overview ==
While the game shares themes of space exploration and resource gathering - plus some elements of its interface - with its predecessor, the two are different in gameplay.

The object of Deuteros is to mine and manage resources, explore the Solar System and beyond. For this, 3 categories of civilians are trained: Producers, Researchers and Marines, out of a pool of 6000 population. The longer these teams are used, they are advanced in three levels, required for some later action (some inventions can be manufactured only by a producer who is at "Expert" level while Pilots with the rank of "Admiral" will be more effective in battles).

New bases built on other planets must be staffed with new teams of Producers in order to construct the shuttles and derricks needed for supply. Some of these events are "milestones" which will trigger new technology to be researched by the scientists.

The player has to take care mostly of the transaction between the planets and the factories and distribute their supply with shuttles and long-range spacecraft. New technology (such as automation computers or teleport) will replace some of the player's involvement, as the player must later concentrate on war.

== Scenario ==
The game is set some 800 years after Millennium, in a time when mankind has won the struggle to make the Earth habitable again but lost its spacefaring capabilities, when the Martians, moments before they were defeated in Mars, hid a small robotic fleet just when Earth was re-settled, and destroying the Moon Base moments before humans returned to Earth as a final deed of vengeance. Eight centuries later, the humans attempt to reach space travel again and rediscover old secrets.

Initially the player has Earth resources with which they can build ships and orbital factories. The first factory will give the player the technology to make IOSs (interplanetary operations spacecraft) which they can build orbital factories over selected planets and moons of the Solar System. First the player can use the IOS to extract material from asteroids not found on Earth (such as silver, platinum etc.), and later build bases on the selected planets with the orbital factories so that exotic material is steadily produced.

In the process the player will meet the Methanoids, colonists from the first game who declared independence when Earth was re-settled. Now they dominate Trans-Neptunian space and act secretively, only allowing the player to swap mined goods for materials they need.

=== War ===
Once the player builds a sixth orbital factory (or gets the Methanoid laser from trading a lot with the Methanoids), the Methanoids will declare war, and in the process the player will have to research and manufacture battle drones and also copy the self-destruct mechanism of the enemies. A teleport system (for inanimate objects) will be discovered that will eliminate the need for supply IOSs.

Once the player conquers all of the solar system, they will discover some alien messages and a blueprint for faster-than-light travel. New technology will allow the player to construct SCGs (star-class galleons) and travel to Proxima Centauri, the first of the seven star systems that have to be conquered. In the process the technology "Hyperspace travel" will be acquired.

Winning requires conquering 8 systems and collecting of 8 parts of a mysterious machine scattered by Methanoids.

Upon winning, the game ends with a mini video clip that shows three picture-slots with icons and pictures of in-game objects changing every 3 seconds accompanied by the main music of the game.

== Critical reception ==
Deuteros was critically well received. Amiga Format awarded 95%, Amiga Power gave 89%, CU Amiga gave 70% and Zero awarded 92%.

== Remakes ==
A PC remake exists in the beta stage of development.
