= Fuzion Frenzy 2 =

2007 video game

- PAL region box art
- Developer: Hudson Soft
- Publisher: Microsoft Game Studios
- Platform: Xbox 360
- Release: NA: 30 January 2007; JP: 8 February 2007; EU: 16 February 2007
- Genre: Party
- Modes: Single-player, multiplayer

Fuzion Frenzy 2 is a 2007 party video game developed by Hudson Soft and published by Microsoft Game Studios for the Xbox 360. It is the sequel to Blitz Games' Fuzion Frenzy.

== Gameplay ==
Like its predecessor, Fuzion Frenzy 2 is a multiplayer game in which players choose colorful characters and compete to win a tournament made up of various mini-games. All six of the original characters - Dub, Geena, Jet, Naomi, Samson, and Zak - make their return, although in most cases with new and different character designs. Up to four players can play, with any positions not filled by humans occupied by computer-controlled opponents of configurable difficulty levels.

While the original title had players playing in various zones on a single planet, Fuzion Frenzy 2 sets the action across seven different planets. The effect on gameplay is similar, as each planet has a certain set of mini-games specific to that planet's environment. There are roughly forty different mini-games, although many of these must be unlocked through play (at a rate of one per successful victory).

Discarding the orbs of Fuzion Frenzy, the new game instead directly awards players points after each mini-game based on their performance. Additionally, players who finish first in mini-games are given a special item which increases their attack, defense, or health during the final stage on that particular planet. At the conclusion of this final stage, the player with the highest cumulative point total wins the planet. Afterwards, all point totals are reset and play continues on a different planet. Tournaments end when a pre-determined number of planets (chosen during game setup) have been won by a single player, thus there is no way to end the game in a tie.

=== Cards ===
The single largest change in Fuzion Frenzy 2 as compared to the original is the inclusion of playable cards. Players start with two such cards, and can hold up to three at a time. Additional cards can be won during certain mini-games, or between mini-games when players scramble to grab one of a handful of cards tossed out onto the stage. Cards are consumed after a single use.

Before each mini-game starts, players have the option of playing one card by pressing a button on their controller. Their choice (i.e. which card to play, if any) is not revealed to other players, lending an element of strategy to the process. Cards that have been played are revealed only after the mini-game ends, possibly altering the way points are awarded, depending on which have been played.

Cards effects can combine in unexpected ways. Hence, if one player plays a multiplier, and two players play an inverse card, the multiplier will be left untouched (due to the effect cancelling itself out after being applied twice). Similarly, a multiplier played by one player can be stolen by a second, which can then be inverted by a third, much to the regret of the second player. Since cards are selected (in secret) ahead of time, it is usually difficult or impossible to predict the exact outcome if several players have a choice of such cards.

When cards change the points which are awarded, the winner of an individual mini-game can also change. That is, if the player who comes in second has played a multiplier card, his or her point total may now exceed that of the player who actually came in first, causing him or her to instead receive the bonus item for first place.

== Development ==
Originally, Fuzion Frenzy 2 was rumored to be in development for a June 2004 release by the original game's developer, Blitz Games. An E3 showing was also rumored, but it never surfaced. Two years passed, and then, on 27 July 2006, Microsoft Game Studios released a press release stating that Fuzion Frenzy 2 was being developed by Hudson Soft. While the original press release advertised a holiday 2006 launch date, the game was finally released on 30 January 2007.

Prior to release, a demo was released on the Xbox Live Marketplace on 22 September 2006, containing three of the mini-games (Conveyor Belt Chaos, Sumo Paint, and Ice Treasure Hunt). The demo supports up to four players.

== Reception ==
Reception

Aggregate score
Aggregator	Score
Metacritic	49/100

Review scores
Publication	Score
Electronic Gaming Monthly	3.83/10
Eurogamer	3/10
Famitsu	19/40
Game Informer	2/10
GamePro	2.5/5
GameSpot	7/10
GameSpy	2.5/5
GameTrailers	6.4/10
GameZone	7/10
IGN	6/10
Official Xbox Magazine (US)	4/10

Fuzion Frenzy 2 received "generally unfavorable" reviews according to review aggregator platform Metacritic. In Japan, Famitsu gave it a score of one four and three fives, for a total of 19 out of 40.
