= Acme Animation Factory =

1994 video game

- North American box art
- Developer: Probe Software
- Publisher: Sunsoft
- Series: Looney Tunes
- Platform: Super Nintendo Entertainment System
- Release: NA: November 1994; PAL: March 1995
- Genre: Educational
- Mode: Single-player

Acme Animation Factory is an educational art and graphics video game released by Sunsoft in November 1994 for the Super Nintendo Entertainment System.

== Gameplay ==
Gameplay screenshot

The game is compatible with the Super NES Mouse in addition to the gamepad. The player is given a series of tools to create their own animated cartoons, using the Looney Tunes characters. The player can alter the graphics, music, and animation. When the cartoon has been created, it can be saved and replayed. Aside from that, card games such as Solitaire and Mix 'n' Match (a variation of the game Concentration) are playable.

== Reception ==
Reception

Review scores
Publication	Score
GamePro	16/20
Mega Fun	57%
Nintendo Power	3.3/5.0
Total!	4+
Video Games (DE)	69%
Play Time	55%

GamePro gave the game a positive review, saying that the variety of activities offered by the cart keeps the player engaged for long stretches. They also praised the graphics and the efficiency of the controls.

== See also ==
- The Bugs Bunny Cartoon Workshop
- Tiny Toon Adventures Cartoon Workshop
