= Invincible Tiger: The Legend of Han Tao =

2009 video game

- Developer: Blitz Arcade
- Publisher: Namco Bandai Games
- Directors: Oliver Clarke; John Jarvis
- Producers: Robert Johnson; Jim Ngui
- Designers: Oliver Clarke; Aron Tomlin; Patrick Santiago
- Programmer: Florian Raoult
- Artists: Simon Bennett Hayes; Nicholas Miles; Dave Price
- Composers: Matt Black; Todd Baker; Edward Hargrave; Peter Ward
- Engine: BlitzTech
- Platforms: PlayStation 3 (PlayStation Network), Xbox 360 (Xbox Live Arcade)
- Release: Xbox Live Arcade; August 26, 2009; PlayStation Network: NA: August 27, 2009; PAL: November 19, 2009
- Genre: Beat 'em-up
- Modes: Single-player, multiplayer

Invincible Tiger: The Legend of Han Tao is a hand-to-hand action video game developed by Blitz Arcade and published by Namco Bandai Games for the PlayStation 3 and Xbox 360. The game tells the story of Han Tao, the General of a Thousand Victories, who attempts to rescue the Star of Destiny from the foul clutches of the Evil Overlord. As Han Tao, players must fight their way through the Evil Overlord's throngs, using a number of hyperbolic hand-to-hand combat techniques, ancient weapons, and Zen-powered attacks. It was released in 2009. The game was removed from all digital stores in 2013.

== Gameplay ==
Invincible Tiger: The Legend of Han Tao features basic beat 'em up and hand-to-hand action elements with a basic interface and easy to learn, pick-up-and-play controls. The game features a number of different modes for single- and multiplayer action. Gamers can play through the game's storyline in co-op mode, which is available both locally and online. The game also includes an Endurance Mode, in which players are tasked with surviving an unending onslaught of foes for a specified amount of time.

The game provides both an anaglyph mode and several stereoscopic modes for 3D viewing while playing the game. While the anaglyph mode will work on any TV, use of the stereoscopic modes requires the player to have a 3D ready TV.

== Reception ==
Reception

Aggregate score
| Aggregator | Score | |
| Aggregator | PS3 | Xbox 360 |
|---|---|---|
| Metacritic | 57/100 | 61/100 |

Review scores
| Publication | Score | |
| Publication | PS3 | Xbox 360 |
|---|---|---|
| GamePro | 2.5/5 | 2.5/5 |
| GameSpot | 6/10 | 6/10 |
| GamesRadar+ | 2/5 | 2/5 |
| IGN | 6.6/10 | 6.6/10 |
| Jeuxvideo.com | 13/20 | 13/20 |
| PlayStation Official Magazine – UK | 6/10 | N/A |
| Official Xbox Magazine (US) | N/A | 6/10 |
| Play | 70% | N/A |
| Retro Gamer | N/A | 72% |
| TeamXbox | N/A | 7.4/10 |
| Teletext GameCentral | N/A | 4/10 |

The game received "mixed" reviews on both platforms according to the review aggregation website Metacritic.

Since its release, the Xbox 360 version sold 9,140 units worldwide by January 2011. Sales moved up to 9,959 units by the end of 2011.

== See also ==
- List of stereoscopic video games
