= Fuzion Frenzy =

2001 video game

- North American box art
- Developer: Blitz Games
- Publisher: Microsoft Game Studios
- Director: Darren Wood
- Programmers: Steve Bond; Neil Campbell; Tom Drummond
- Artists: Rehaan Akhtar; Mark Capewell; Jonathan Evans
- Composer: Rob Lord
- Engine: BlitzTech
- Platform: Xbox
- Release: NA: 15 November 2001; EU: 14 March 2002
- Genre: Party
- Modes: Single-player, multiplayer

Fuzion Frenzy is a 2001 party video game developed by Blitz Games and published by Microsoft Game Studios for the Xbox. The game is a four-player party game featuring 45 different minigames. Developed as a launch title for the Xbox in the United States, Fuzion Frenzy was the first game mastered for the console and developed to fill the niche for a party game in its launch strategy. The game was released to mixed reviews, with critics praising the game's accessibility and visual presentation as an early showcase of the capabilities of the Xbox, whilst faulting the game's repetition and limited variety of minigames. Fuzion Frenzy was a moderate commercial success, although slow initial sales led Microsoft Game Studios to discontinue work by Blitz Games on a sequel for the Xbox. A sequel developed by Hudson Soft for the Xbox 360, Fuzion Frenzy 2, was later released in 2007. The game was one of the first four included in the Xbox Backwards Compatibility for PC program on 22 July 2026; it subsequently became available across all tiers of Xbox Game Pass. It was Bill Gates' favorite Xbox game.

== Gameplay ==
A screenshot of gameplay in Fuzion Frenzy

Fuzion Frenzy is an action-based party game in which up to four players can compete in one of two game modes, 'Tournament', in which players complete a series of minigames across several stages, and 'Mini-Game Frenzy' modes, in which players can play specific minigames. In the core Tournament game mode, players select a character and compete to earn the most points by participating in three minigames across two, four or six stages. In contrast to other party games, Fuzion Frenzy does not contain a persistent game board, with players participating in a succession of minigames. Each stage is assigned a randomly-selected Zone, which determines the type of minigame to be played. Minigames pit players against each other or in teams, and allocate orbs to players based on the outcome.

Each stage ends with a Fuzion Frenzy Round, in which players grab orbs of their color and rush them to a goal to score the most points in a time limit. Players are able to use the orbs accumulated throughout a stage to either convert to points at the end of a stage or wager in a Fuzion Frenzy round, providing them with more opportunities to score points in the round. During a Fuzion Frenzy Round, players can steal orbs from other players by attacking when they are carried. At the end of the Fuzion Frenzy Round, the player with the most points from banked orbs or orbs collected during the round wins the stage, with the player that wins the most stages or earns the most points winning the game.

== Development ==
Fuzion Frenzy was developed by British studio Blitz Games, founded by twin brother developers Andrew and Philip Oliver. In 2000, Microsoft invited the studio to pitch a game for the upcoming Xbox, seeking to fill a niche for a party title aimed at a more mature audience in the American market. Blitz Games completed work on the game, originally titled Blitz Party, with a team of 35 staff in ten months to coincide with the release of the Xbox. The studio took an open-ended and collaborative approach to the game's design, splitting the development into small teams to prototype minigames and working with Microsoft to identify the best concepts. To create a coherent visual style, the studio's art department took inspiration from films such as Blade Runner and The Running Man and skateboarding culture to create a "strong futuristic sport arena look" for the game. Producing a title for an upcoming console presented difficulties, with Philip Oliver reflecting that Microsoft micromanaged the production's finances and arranged confidentialities and private meetings. Fuzion Frenzy was the first game to be finalized as a master release for the Xbox, with the game meeting the planned release date of the console's launch in November 2001.

== Reception ==
Reception

Aggregate score
Aggregator	Score
Metacritic	70/100

Review scores
Publication	Score
AllGame	3/5
Edge	3/10
Electronic Gaming Monthly	3.67/10
Game Informer	6/10
GamePro	3.5/5
GameRevolution	C+
GameSpot	6.7/10
GameSpy	68%
GameZone	8/10
IGN	8.3/10
Next Generation	3/5
Official Xbox Magazine (US)	7.8/10

Fuzion Frenzy received "mixed or average reviews" according to the review aggregation website Metacritic, with an average score of 70%. Positive reviews praised the game's accessible and unique approach to the party game formula. IGN praised the game's pacing, stating "Fuzion Frenzy (gets) you to the games as quickly as humanly possible, always keeping you moving and playing, not watching and waiting." Official Xbox Magazine praised the game's accessibility, writing "the instructions and gameplay concepts are so simple that absolutely anyone can play". GameZone described Fusion Frenzy as the "ultimate party game...intended to be played by everyone", whilst noting the game "defies the traditional party game style". However, several critics noted that the game had fewer merits as a single-player title, with GameSpy remarking that the mode "isn't very compelling...without other players around".

Reviewers were mostly positive about the visual presentation of the game as an early showcase of the potential of the Xbox. IGN described the game as a "perfect example of what the Xbox can do with its power", citing "fast framerates, crisp textures, tons of realtime lighting and particle effects". GameZone described the characters and backgrounds as "stunning", highlighting the special effects used for lighting and water rendering. GameSpot noted the game's use of "vibrant" colored lighting and particle effects to "create a distinct look for the game", and wrote "the arenas have a good level of detail, and the high-resolution textures look nice and sharp", although remarked that the game was "unable to maintain a constant frame rate".

Critics were mixed on the quality of the minigames, with negative reviews critiquing their limited variety. Describing the game as lacking "imagination, innovation, impact or fun", Edge noted most minigames "fit into several oft-visited categories" and critiqued the "appalling dash and collect rounds", finding the game had "nothing to surprise". Similarly, Electronic Gaming Monthly critiqued the repetition and lack of differences between minigames, observing "most are too similar" and possess "similar themes". AllGame noted that "the overwhelming majority of contests involve quickly collecting icons or tokens to score points", faulting the game's lack of "team-specific activities" and "directly confrontational mini-games", making the game "best played in small increments". GamePro similarly wrote "most of the games aren't deep enough to survive repetitive play."

=== Sales ===
Fuzion Frenzy received moderate commercial success upon release. Next Generation estimated the game sold 680,000 copies and earned $16 million in the United States by July 2006, making it the 93rd highest-selling console title since 2000 at that time. Andrew Oliver remarked that the game had a slow sales performance, estimating the game sold "around half a million" units in its first quarter, but "over a million" in total, reflecting that sales were constrained by a "small install base" and the "cost of additional controllers limited its potential".

== Legacy ==
Following release, plans to expand the Fuzion Frenzy brand were discontinued by Microsoft due to weak initial sales performance, including a 'premium pack' bundle of the game with multiple controllers, and cancellation of work by Blitz Games on a sequel compatible with Xbox Live. The sequel, tentatively planned for release on 1 June 2004, would have featured 50 revamped and new minigames and Xbox Live support. As sales of Fuzion Frenzy increased in later years, Microsoft put the concept of a sequel to tender, awarding the project to another company, Hudson Soft. The sequel, Fuzion Frenzy 2, was released for the Xbox 360 in 2007.
