= Gremlins 2: The New Batch (video game) =

1990 video game

- North American NES box art
- Developers: Sunsoft; Riedel Software Productions; Motivetime; Topo Soft
- Publishers: Sunsoft; Hi Tech Expressions; Elite Systems; Topo Soft
- Designer: Yoshiaki Iwata
- Programmers: Keiichi Suzuki; Hideyuki Udagawa
- Composer: Naoki Kodaka
- Platforms: NES, Game Boy, Amiga, Atari ST, Commodore 64, MS-DOS, MSX, Amstrad CPC, ZX Spectrum
- Release: NES: NA: October 1990; JP: December 14, 1990; EU: February 21, 1991; Game Boy: JP: December 21, 1990; NA: January 1991; EU: April 23, 1992; Amiga, C64, CPC, MS-DOS, MSX, Spectrum, ST; 1990
- Genre: Platform
- Mode: Single-player

Gremlins 2: The New Batch is a platform game developed and published by Sunsoft for the Nintendo Entertainment System and Game Boy in 1990. The game was released in conjunction with the film from Warner Bros. and Amblin Entertainment.

== Gameplay ==
In the NES version, the player controls Gizmo through various levels in the Clamp Center skyscraper, armed with weapons ranging from the genetically modified super tomato in the Splice O' Life laboratory to the new matchstick-firing bow in the later sections. The goal of the game is to reach the Gremlin Control Center to wipe out all gremlins inside. The Game Boy version was a side-scroller also featuring Gizmo.

== Other versions ==
The Spanish company Topo Soft and Motivetime developed a sidescrolling Gremlins 2: The New Batch video game for Amiga, Atari ST, Commodore 64, MS-DOS, MSX, Amstrad CPC, and the ZX Spectrum, distributed by Erbe Software and Topo Soft in Spain and by Elite abroad, being the first time a Spanish videogame company got an exclusive license from a Hollywood film to make a video game. The game features Billy Peltzer using a wide variety of weapons (flashlights, tomatoes, Frisbees and the like) to dispatch of gremlin adversaries. The goal in each of the five levels is to locate a specific item required to see the game's good ending.

Hi Tech Expressions also released a version for multiple computers in 1990.

== Reception ==
Reception

Review scores
Publication	Score
Electronic Gaming Monthly	6/10, 7/10, 7/10, 7/10 (GB)
Famitsu	6/10, 6/10, 7/10, 4/10 (GB)
Hippon Super!	5/10 (FC)

Reviewing the Family Computer version of the game, Ichiro Tezuka wrote in Hippon Super! that the game's graphics and music were high quality, but the gameplay was ordinary with nothing new or exciting.
