= Your Doodles Are Bugged! =

2010 video game

- Developer: Spyn Doctor Games
- Publishers: Spyn Doctor Games (X360); Blitz 1UP (PC)
- Platforms: Xbox 360 (Xbox Live Arcade), Microsoft Windows
- Release: Xbox Live Arcade; February 1, 2010; Windows; April 25, 2011
- Genre: Puzzle
- Mode: Single-player

Your Doodles Are Bugged! is a puzzle video game developed by Spyn Doctor Games for Xbox 360 in 2010, and for Microsoft Windows through the Steam platform in 2011.

== Reception ==
Reception

Aggregate score
Aggregator	Score
Metacritic	(PC) 69/100

Review scores
Publication	Score
4Players	(X360) 64%
Eurogamer	(PC) 6/10
GameSpot	(PC) 7/10
Gamezebo	(PC) 3/5
IGN	(PC) 7.5/10

The PC version received "average" reviews according to the review aggregation website Metacritic.
