= Mickey's Ultimate Challenge =

1994 video game

- Box art
- Developer: Designer Software
- Publishers: Hi Tech Expressions; Tec Toy (Master System)
- Platforms: Sega Genesis, SNES, Game Boy, Game Gear, Master System
- Release: 1994; Master System: BR: 1998
- Genres: Platform, puzzle
- Modes: Single-player, multiplayer

Mickey's Ultimate Challenge is a puzzle video game developed by Designer Software and published by Hi Tech Expressions for the Super NES, Game Boy, Sega Genesis, Master System, and Game Gear under license from Walt Disney Computer Software. The Master System version, released in Brazil by Tec Toy in 1998, was the last game released for that console. All other versions were released in 1994. Players move Mickey through the game by making him walk, jump, and go through doors. There are five major challenges, a segue, and a final challenge. It was met with mixed reviews from gaming magazines.

== Plot ==
Mickey is lying in bed reading a book of fairy tales. He thinks to himself how wonderful it would be to live on a far-away land in a magical castle. Mickey falls asleep and dreams that he learns of trouble in Beanswick. There is a strange rumbling over the castle and no one can explain it. Mickey (or Minnie) volunteers to investigate. He must go through a series of challenges in various rooms of the castle in order to collect magic beans and items.

== Gameplay ==
Mickey's Ultimate Challenge is a puzzle game where players must complete challenges to beat the game. Players must go through a series of challenges in various rooms of the castle in order to collect magic beans and items.

Players must sort books in a medieval library as a part of their challenge. The screenshot from the Sega Master System version is being shown.

In Sorting Books, books are floating up and down in the library of the Beanswick castle and Mickey must sort them in alphabetical order by jumping on them. Depending on the difficulty, there are various numbers of books to be sorted and different patterns for the books to float in. Only a portion of the alphabet must be sorted. Once the books have been sorted, players receive an item from Horace Horsecollar.

In Moving Potions, Mickey is shrunk to a tiny size and placed on a chess-like game board. Potion bottles are on this board, as well as block obstacles that must be maneuvered around. The potion bottles are to be pushed into a magic mirror on the board. In more difficult games, there are more boards to play in increasing difficulty. Once all potions have been collected, the player returns to normal size and receives their item from Donald Duck (dressed as a wizard).

Picture Matching is a timed, memory challenge. Mickey must dust off portraits hanging on the castle walls in matching pairs. Basically, it's the matching card game. He must complete this task before the lights in the castle dim to darkness. Depending on the difficulty, there are more or fewer pictures. For challenges with more pictures, more time is given. He is armed with a feather duster and a sliding ladder. Players must match up all the pictures before time and light runs out to receive an item from Daisy Duck as a princess.

Playing the Pipes is another memory game. Several pipes light up and make different noises in a pattern that builds every turn. Mickey must listen, remember, and repeat what he heard. He can do this by jumping on the top of the pipes and playing the notes back in the proper order. The pipes only play one melody, adding one note after every time Mickey successfully completes the previous one. The difficulty of gameplay determines the length of the melody. Players must play all the right pipes to receive the item from Huey, Dewey, and Louie.

In Guess the Tools, Goofy wants Mickey to guess what tools are in his toolbox. Mickey has seven attempts to successfully guess the tools and their order inside Goofy's toolbox. After each guess, a clue appears telling players how many and which tools they guessed in the correct order. In easier games, the hints will turn red or green to denote correctness. In more difficult games, a small quartered square of red and green pieces tells Mickey which ones are right. Players must correctly guess what is in Goofy's toolbox to earn an item from him.

Exchanging Items is the segue of the game. The items Mickey collected were of no importance to their previous owners but would serve useful to others in Beanswick. Mickey must go back to all the others in each challenge and give them the item that suits them. In return for each correctly placed item, Mickey receives a magic bean. Only after retrieving all five beans can Mickey use them. After returning the items to their respective owners, Mickey visits the well. The annoying rumbling occurs again and Mickey throws his beans near the well. Suddenly, a giant beanstalk grows straight up into the clouds. A curious Mickey climbs the beanstalk into the clouds and encounters a giant. The giant is sound asleep and snoring. This massive snoring is the cause of all the trouble for Beanswick. There is a scrambled picture of an alarm clock standing next to the giant. Mickey must unscramble the picture by sliding the pieces and wake up the giant. After Mickey wakes up and talks to the giant, the troubles in Beanswick are solved.

== Reception ==
Reception

Review scores
| Publication | Score |
|---|---|
| Consoles + | 81% |
| Electronic Gaming Monthly | 6.25/10 (SMD); 6.75/10 (GB) |
| Game Players | 71% (SNES) |
| Hyper | 23/100 (SNES) |
| Joypad | 80% (SNES) |
| Mean Machines Sega | 72/100 (SMD) |
| Nintendo Power | 12.5/20 (GB) |
| Super Game Power | 3.3/5 (SNES) |
| Super Play | 54% (SNES) |
| VideoGames & Computer Entertainment | 8/10 (SNES) |
| Electronic Games | B (GB); B+ (SGG) |

Mickey's Ultimate Challenge has received generally mixed reviews from gaming magazines. Electronic Gaming Monthly gave the Genesis version a 6.25 out of 10. They remarked that the game is much too easy for puzzle veterans but would be good fun for younger players. They gave the Game Boy version a 6.75 out of 10, again commenting that the puzzles are easy but fun, particularly for younger gamers. In issue #59 of Nintendo Power magazine reviewed the SNES version and stated that the game proved "to be fun for its intended audience".

== See also ==
- List of Disney video games
