= Ian Bird (software developer) =

British computer programmer

Ian Bird is a game programmer and game designer. Along with other game credits, Bird wrote the computer games Millennium 2.2 and Deuteros.

== Games ==
- Theatre Europe (1985)
- Millennium 2.2 (1989)
- Deuteros: The Next Millennium (1991)
- Campaign II (1993)
- Millennia: Altered Destinies (1995)
- WarGames (1998)
- Chicken Run (2000)
- The Mummy Returns (2001)
- Pac-Man World 3 (2003)
