= Zapper: One Wicked Cricket =

2002 video game

- PS2 cover art (PAL region)
- Developers: Blitz Games; Atomic Planet (GBA)
- Publisher: Infogrames
- Director: Darren Wood
- Producer: Team Antics
- Designers: Paul Jennings; Russ Earwaker; Jon Eckersley
- Programmers: Steve Bond; Richard Hackett; Matthew Hampton
- Artists: Dean Atkin; James Childs; Sandro Da Cruz
- Composers: John Guscott; Matt Black; Gerard Gourley; Andrew Morris
- Engine: BlitzTech
- Platforms: Windows, PlayStation 2, Xbox, Game Boy Advance, GameCube
- Release: NA: October 17, 2002 (PC); NA: November 5, 2002; PAL: March 14, 2003
- Genre: Platform
- Mode: Single-player

Zapper: One Wicked Cricket! is a platform game for the Xbox, GameCube, PlayStation 2, Game Boy Advance, and Microsoft Windows. For most platforms, it was developed by Blitz Games and published by Infogrames; Atomic Planet Entertainment developed the Game Boy Advance version. Zapper was released in North America in 2002 and 2003 in Europe. On November 17, 2008, Zapper became available on Xbox Live as part of the Xbox Originals range. On February 15, 2024, Zapper was re-released for Microsoft Windows on GOG.com and Steam platforms.

== Plot ==
During a squabble over television, the cricket Zapper tries to use his younger brother Zipper (a nymph) as a substitute TV antenna. Zipper is snatched away by an infamous thieving magpie, Maggie, who leaves an egg at the scene of the crime. Unfortunately, much to his dismay, Zapper sets off and determines to rescue his brother and turn Maggie into a jailbird. At the end of the game, Zapper gets Zipper back after defeating Maggie, and finally sets him up as a substitute TV antenna, just in time to watch TV by himself.

== Gameplay ==
The player's aim is to traverse over eighteen levels as Zapper the cricket. Along the way the player must collect six eggs in each level. The player can jump or zap through the levels. If Zapper touches an enemy or falls into an environmental hazard, Zapper will lose his life and will respawn at the last collected egg checkpoint. Zapper has turn-based enemy movements, but the gameplay is similar to Frogger 2: Swampy's Revenge, which instead has vehicles moving independently. It is described in the GameSpot review as "basically just Frogger without the license".

== Reception ==
Reception

Aggregate score
Aggregator	Score				
Aggregator	GBA	GameCube	PC	PS2	Xbox
Metacritic	58/100	55/100	58/100	56/100	55/100

Review scores
Publication	Score				
Publication	GBA	GameCube	PC	PS2	Xbox
Computer Games Magazine	N/A	N/A	3.5/5	N/A	N/A
Game Informer	N/A	8.75/10	N/A	N/A	N/A
GameSpot	N/A	N/A	N/A	6.6/10	6.6/10
GameZone	7.3/10	7.1/10	6.5/10	N/A	5.4/10
IGN	5.8/10	4.5/10	5.5/10	5.5/10	4.1/10
Nintendo Power	N/A	2.9/5	N/A	N/A	N/A
Nintendo World Report	4/10	5/10	N/A	N/A	N/A
Official U.S. PlayStation Magazine	N/A	N/A	N/A	2.5/5	N/A
Official Xbox Magazine (US)	N/A	N/A	N/A	N/A	6/10
PC Gamer (US)	N/A	N/A	60%	N/A	N/A

The game received "mixed" reviews on all platforms according to the review aggregation website Metacritic. IGN gave the Xbox version an unfavorable review over a month before its U.S. release.
