= Cubix Robots for Everyone: Showdown =

2003 video game

- GameCube cover art
- Developer: Blitz Games
- Publisher: The 3DO Company
- Director: David Manuel
- Designers: Matt Armstrong; Scott Davidson; Dave Flynn; Lauren Grindrod; Simon Reed
- Writers: Chris Bateman; Richard Boon
- Composers: John Guscott; Matt Black; Gerard Gourley; Andrew Morris
- Platforms: GameCube, PlayStation 2
- Release: NA: June 2, 2003
- Genres: Action-adventure, role-playing
- Modes: Single-player, multiplayer

Cubix Robots for Everyone: Showdown is a 2003 action-adventure role-playing video game developed by Blitz Games and published by The 3DO Company for the GameCube and PlayStation 2. The game is based on the Cubix: Robots for Everyone television series. A version for the Xbox was also announced, but was never released.

== Gameplay ==
In Cubix: Robots for Everyone, the player enters Bubble Town, where robots have gone rogue. As part of the Cubix gang, the mission is to track down these malfunctioning machines and restore order. The player controls Connor or Abby and must collect 25 Cubix robots from the television series to use in turn-based combat. Each victory lets the player collect the defeated robot and add it to their roster for future fights. The game consists of Story, Battle, Challenges, Tournament, and Mini-Game modes. Cubix can transform into various vehicles. The game is rounded out with both single-player and multiplayer options.

== Development ==
The game was originally intended to be released in September 2002, but was delayed to June 2, 2003, shortly after 3DO went defunct.

== Reception ==
Reception

Aggregate score
Aggregator	Score
GameRankings	57.33%

Review scores
Publication	Score
Electronic Gaming Monthly	60%
Nintendo Power	62%

Cubix Robots for Everyone: Showdown received mixed reviews from critics. It holds a 57.33% rating on GameRankings based on 3 reviews. GMR gave the game a mediocre review, comparing it unfavorably to "Pokemon with bad wiring".
