= Buccaneer: The Pursuit of Infamy =

2008 video game

- Developer(s): Stickman Studios
- Publisher(s): Blitz Arcade
- Platform(s): Microsoft Windows
- Release: WW: December 6, 2008
- Genre(s): Shooter game
- Mode(s): Single-player, Multiplayer

Buccaneer: The Pursuit of Infamy is a pirate video game developed by Stickman Studios and published by Blitz Arcade. It was released on December 6, 2008 for Microsoft Windows.

== Gameplay ==
In Buccaneer: The Pursuit of Infamy, the player takes the role of captain of one of the pirate ships. The single-player mode consists of up to 50 missions that follow a captain rookie, who joins a group of pirates named the Golden Buccaneers.

== Reception ==
Reception

Aggregate score
Aggregator	Score
Metacritic	66/100

Review scores
Publication	Score
4Players	52%
GameZone	7/10
Jeuxvideo.com	14/20
Gameplanet	7.5/10

On its release, Buccaneer: The Pursuit of Infamy was met with "mixed or average" reviews from critics, with an aggregate score of 68/100 on Metacritic.
