= PowerUp Forever =

2008 video game

- Developer: Blitz Arcade
- Publisher: Namco Bandai Games
- Platforms: Xbox 360 (XBLA), PlayStation 3 (PSN)
- Release: XBLA; December 10, 2008; PSN; December 11, 2008
- Genre: Multidirectional shooter
- Mode: Single-player

PowerUp Forever is a downloadable multidirectional shooter developed by Blitz Arcade and published by Namco Bandai Games for the Xbox 360 via Xbox Live Arcade, and the PlayStation 3 via PlayStation Network. It was released on Xbox Live Arcade on December 10, 2008 and the PlayStation Network on December 11, 2008.

== Gameplay ==
Gameplay screenshot

The player controls a ship, with dual analog controls similar to Robotron 2084 and Geometry Wars; the left thumbstick controls the ship's movement, while the right thumbstick aims the weapon. The player flies in a fluidic space, trying to kill parasites to attract the level boss. Killing the boss awards the player a new ability, such as lasers, plasma arcs, shields and upgraded weaponry.

Killing the boss causes the player's ship to grow, causing former enemies to shrink and introducing new enemies from the background to the fore, similar to Spore's Cellular phase.

== Reception ==
IGN awarded PowerUp Forever a 6.5 of 10, praising its unique look, calling it "part Schizoid, part Geometry Wars, and part Flow", but criticized the relative lack of variety in gameplay.
