= Tiny Toon Adventures: Cartoon Workshop =

1992 video game

Tiny Toon Adventures Cartoon Workshop
- Cover art
- Developer: Novotrade International
- Publisher: Konami
- Designers: Adonyi Gábor; Kováts Borbála; Orbán Nándor
- Programmers: Mikolics Attila; Szöllősi György; Szenttornyai László
- Composer: Magyari András
- Platform: NES
- Release: 1992
- Genre: Edutainment
- Mode: Single-player

Tiny Toon Adventures: Cartoon Workshop is an educational entertainment video game for the Nintendo Entertainment System based on Tiny Toon Adventures. It was developed by Novotrade and released by Konami on August 17, 1992.

== Gameplay ==
The game allows the player to make a cartoon by writing the scenario, selecting music and sound, designing the set, and directing the actions taken by the in-game characters.

Up to two characters can be featured on screen at once, with Buster, Babs, Plucky, Furrball, Calamity, and Little Beeper available for selection. The characters can be set in many different poses and situations, and the cartoons have a myriad of settings and backgrounds for the show to take place. There are also options for musical inserts, sound effects, captions, and editing features using an easy-to-use graphic user interface that resembles a watered-down version of most Windows 3.1 applications.

Saving the cartoon is not possible, however, unless one uses a VCR or other screen capture method. Cartoons created on this video game can only last up to five minutes, as opposed to the typical 28 minutes of an episode of the TV show Tiny Toon Adventures.

== Reception ==
Reception

Review scores
Publication	Score
Entertainment Weekly	B+
Power Unlimited	8/10

== See also ==
- Acme Animation Factory
