= WarGames: Defcon 1 =

1998 video game

- European cover box
- Developer: Interactive Studios
- Publisher: MGM Interactive: EU: Electronic Arts
- Directors: John Whigham; Richard Hackett
- Producers: Robb Alvey; Jim Banting; Robert Rader; Sean Wilson
- Designers: Leigh Griffiths; Satty Mann
- Programmers: Ian Bird; Andrew Oliver; John Whigham; Richard Hackett
- Artist: Stephen Thomson
- Writers: John Badham; John Tarnoff
- Composers: Tommy Tallarico; Fabian Del Priore
- Platforms: PlayStation, Windows
- Release: EU: June 1998 (PS); NA: 29 July 1998; EU: 21 August 1998 (PC)
- Genres: Tactical shooter, Real-time strategy
- Modes: Single-player, multiplayer

WarGames: Defcon 1 (known simply as WarGames on PC) is a video game for the PlayStation and Microsoft Windows developed by Interactive Studios and co-published by MGM Interactive and Electronic Arts (in North America, MGM Interactive solely published the game). Although both versions possess the same missions and content, the PlayStation version is a tactical vehicle-shooting game while the PC version is a real-time strategy game (similar to Jeff Wayne's The War of the Worlds). The game is loosely based on the movie WarGames; the story was scripted by John Badham, director of the original film.

== PlayStation version ==
The player plays as NORAD or WOPR. The game takes place 20 years after the film: WOPR attempts to exterminate humanity and NORAD tries to stop it. During a mission the player takes control of a vehicle and can change the controls of any vehicle the team has—for example, while NORAD has heavily armored and armed tanks and aircraft, WOPR possesses exotically futuristic mechs and hovercraft. Vehicles can recharge ammunition by obtaining powers. The player can command their team to send resupply on ammunition, repair damage units, attack, or follow the player's main vehicle.

=== Multiplayer ===
WarGames: Defcon 1 features 2-player split screen VS. or Co-op. The Co-op allows the players to play all single player levels with a partner. Unlike most multiplayer games, the screen is split diagonally.

== PC version ==
Unlike the PlayStation version, the PC version is a real-time strategy game, in which the player can control different units at once. The missions are identical to the PlayStation version.

The electronic registration program included on the game CD contained the Marburg computer virus; playing the game would not cause the player's computer to be infected with the virus, but registering it electronically would.

== Development ==
WarGames: Defcon 1 was one of the few strategy games of its time to not use a tile system, instead allowing troops to be place and moved freely across the landscape. Team leader John Whigham commented, "While this is of great benefit to the player and to the game in general, the programming nightmares it raises have given us more than one sleepless night over the last few months." The game was showcased at E3 1997

MGM Interactive launched a $1.3 million TV ad campaign for WarGames. The 30-second spots targeted 18-to-24-year-old males via national cable network programs in the top 25 U.S. markets.

== Reception ==
Reception

Aggregate score
Aggregator	Score	
Aggregator	PC	PS
GameRankings	66%	78%

Review scores
Publication	Score	
Publication	PC	PS
CNET Gamecenter	7/10	N/A
Computer Games Strategy Plus	4/5	N/A
Computer Gaming World	1.5/5	N/A
Edge	8/10	7/10
Electronic Gaming Monthly	N/A	7.125/10
Game Informer	N/A	7.25/10
GamePro	2.5/5 (Note: GamePro gave the PC version two 4/5 scores for graphics and sound, 2/5 for control, and 2.5/5 for overall fun factor.)	4.5/5 (Note: GamePro gave the PlayStation version three 4.5 scores for graphics, sound, and control, and 4.5/5 for overall fun factor.)
GameRevolution	C+	N/A
GameSpot	7.1/10	7.6/10
IGN	7/10	N/A
Next Generation	3/5	3/5
Official U.S. PlayStation Magazine	N/A	4/5
PC Accelerator	7/10	N/A
PC Gamer (US)	81%	N/A

The PlayStation version received favourable reviews, while the PC version received average reviews, according to the review aggregation website GameRankings. Next Generation called the former version "a fun romp that is, unfortunately, a bit on the short side. A two-player combat option alleviates this problem somewhat. The bottom line? If you have a second player handy, get it. If not, rent it – it makes for a good three-day weekend of fun"; and called the latter "a fairly competent and well-crafted game. It just doesn't take the genre in any new direction and feels like little more than a me-too effort." Mark Kanarick of AllGame gave Defcon 1 two-and-a-half stars out of five, saying, "I like what MGM Interactive is trying to do in WarGames Defcon 1, but the game just seems to far out there for someone who is not a strategy/wargame enthusiast to grasp. I think it is enjoyable for those looking for a 'different' game, but there is nothing substantial here to warrant anything more than a rental."
