= Fantastic Pets =

2011 video game

- Developer(s): Blitz Games Studios
- Publisher(s): THQ Inc.
- Platform(s): Xbox 360
- Release: NA: April 12, 2011; AU: April 14, 2011; EU: April 15, 2011
- Genre(s): Virtual pet
- Mode(s): Single-player, multiplayer

Fantastic Pets is a virtual-pet life simulation video game developed by Blitz Games Studios and published by THQ Inc. The game was released on April 12, 2011, in North America, April 14, 2011, in Australia, and on April 15, 2011, in Europe.

== Gameplay ==
The game uses augmented reality to allow players to interact with their pets in their living room via Microsoft's Kinect.

Players start the game by choosing a pet from a variety of animals, including dogs, cats, lizards, and ponies. Players can then engage with their pets through mini-games and activities, such as washing and brushing them, playing fetch, chasing bubbles, and teaching them voice- and gesture-based commands.

As players progress through the game, they can earn gems that can be used to unlock new ways to customize their pet's appearance. For example, players can change their pet's skin or fur color and markings, or add wings and horns. Players can also adopt more pets for a total of four.

== Reception ==
Reception

Aggregate score
Aggregator	Score
Metacritic	66/100

Review scores
Publication	Score
Gamekult	40/100
IGN	7.5/10
Official Xbox Magazine (UK)	8/10
Official Xbox Magazine (US)	6.5/10

Fantastic Pets received "mixed or average" reviews according to review aggregator Metacritic.

Kristine Steimer on IGN rated the game 7.5/10. Also stated that "Loads of customization options paired with the leveling up system means you or your little one will spend plenty of hours toying around with the cuties."

Wired stated that "Still, despite some issues with the technology itself, Fantastic Pets is a genuinely fun title, particularly for the parents of young children. It takes the chore out of pet ownership and encourages experimentation and creativity. It may not always work, but when it does the charm certainly shines through."
