= Paper Titans =

2013 video game

- App Store icon featuring The Collector titan
- Developer: Blitz Games Studios
- Publisher: Blitz Games Studios
- Platform: iOS
- Release: May 2, 2013
- Genre: Puzzle
- Mode: Single-player

Paper Titans is a puzzle video game developed and published by Blitz Games Studios for iOS in 2013.

== Reception ==
Reception

Aggregate score
Aggregator	Score
Metacritic	64/100

Review scores
Publication	Score
Gamezebo	2/5
IGN	8.2/10
Jeuxvideo.com	15/20
Pocket Gamer	3/5
TouchArcade	3/5

The game received "mixed" reviews according to the review aggregation website Metacritic.
