= Droplitz =

2009 video game

- Developer: Blitz Arcade
- Publisher: Atlus USA
- Director: Steve Stopps
- Designers: James A. Parker (original concept); Kory Vandenberg
- Programmer: Lee Winder
- Artists: Richard Jones; Nina Truman
- Composers: Matt Black; Todd Baker; Simon Barford; Richard Blackley; Edward Hargrave; Peter Ward
- Engine: BlitzTech
- Platforms: Xbox 360, PlayStation 3, Microsoft Windows, iOS
- Release: Xbox Live Arcade; 24 June 2009; PSN; 25 June 2009; Windows; 26 June 2009 iOS; 27 June 2009
- Genre: Puzzle
- Mode: Single-player

Droplitz is a puzzle video game developed by Blitz Arcade and published by Atlus USA. It was released for Xbox Live Arcade, PlayStation Network, Microsoft Windows and iOS in June 2009. A sequel called Droplitz Delight was released for Windows Phone in May 2012.

== Reception ==
Reception

Aggregate scores
Aggregator	Score
GameRankings	(PC) 82% (PS3, X360) 74% (iOS) 70%
Metacritic	(PC) 78/100 (PS3) 76/100 (X360) 74/100

Review scores
Publication	Score
The A.V. Club	(X360) B
Destructoid	(X360) 9.5/10
Edge	(X360) 5/10
GameDaily	(X360) 8/10
GamePro	2.5/5
GamesRadar+	4/5
GameZone	(X360) 6.7/10
IGN	7.5/10
PlayStation Official Magazine – UK	(PS3) 6/10
Official Xbox Magazine (US)	(X360) 7/10
Retro Gamer	(X360) 96%

The PC and PlayStation 3 versions received "generally favorable reviews", while the Xbox 360 version received "mixed or average reviews", according to the review aggregation website Metacritic.

Since its release, the Xbox 360 version sold 6,740 units worldwide by January 2011. Sales moved up to 10,341 units by the end of 2011.

== Dispute ==
There is an ongoing dispute as to who originally came up with the original game concept for Droplitz as an individual provided evidence that they came up with a similar game concept over one year before the release of Droplitz and attempted to pitch it to the same game studio, Blitz Games Studios, which would then go on to produce the Droplitz game.
