= Fun House (video game) =

1991 video game

- NES cover art
- Developer: Realtime Associates
- Publisher: Hi Tech Expressions
- Designer: Ironwind Software
- Composer: George Sanger
- Platforms: Nintendo Entertainment System, MS-DOS
- Release: NES: NA: January 1991; MS-DOS: NA: 1991
- Genre: Action/Shooter
- Modes: NES: Single-player; MS-DOS: Single-player or Multiplayer

Fun House is a 1991 action video game based on the US version of the television show Fun House. It was released in North America for the Nintendo Entertainment System and MS-DOS with significant differences between the two.

== Gameplay ==
=== NES version ===
Instead of killing people with weapons, kids have to hit targets in the game with an infinite supply of tomatoes.

The general gameplay concept is that each level is like a child's version of The Running Man with a basic top-down view. Players must throw tomatoes skillfully at a series of easy-to-hit targets. Some elements of the game are indirectly taken from the classic arcade game Pole Position (except that the player does not have the option to play as a Formula One vehicle).

In order to make it to the next level, the player must make it from the starting line to the finish within the time limit with a young child on inline skates. Otherwise, the player loses a chance and must start the stage over again. The host of the televised game show, J. D. Roth, congratulates players for winning a stage while taunting the player with late 1980s/early 1990s sarcasm when he loses a "chance." Icy floors and slime colored ramps offer an additional challenge to the player. There are 72 rooms in the entire Fun House; with targets that are either numbered or given a generic target graphic. Each room has a name that usually gives a clue about how the room's design is implemented; either as clues that describe themselves or as a pun-laden name.

Although the player is given three chances to successfully navigate the entire Fun House, collecting 25 silver coins acts as a 1-up. Warp zones will allow players to access the more difficult levels of the Fun House at an earlier time; thus allowing gamers who are pressed for time a chance to beat the game with a higher level of risk.

Realtime Associates released a similar game lacking the Fun House branding for the Game Boy under the name of Out of Gas.

=== MS-DOS version ===
In the MS-DOS version of Fun House, the players have to play in three mini-games before a trivia round; they are either a shooting game or a different kind of arcade game. After answering three kid-oriented trivia questions (usually about ice cream or elementary school knowledge), they had to run through the Fun House Maze for some more points. Each player had to go into the Fun House three times to pick up prizes. Most of the prizes were good (adds points to the score) while some of them were actually obstacles (deducts points from the score).
