= Blitz Games Studios =

British video game developer

Blitz Games Studios Limited
- Formerly: Dizzy Enterprises Limited (1990–1994); Interactive Studios Limited (1994–2000); Blitz Games Limited (2000–2008)
- Type: Private
- Industry: Video games
- Founded: 1990; 36 years ago
- Founders: Andrew and Philip Oliver
- Defunct: 12 September 2013
- Fate: Dissolved
- Successor: Radiant Worlds
- Headquarters: Leamington Spa, England
- Key people: Philip Oliver (CEO); Andrew Oliver (CTO); Richard Smithies (COO)
- Number of employees: 230+ (2009)
- Divisions: Blitz Games; Blitz Arcade; Volatile Games; TruSim; Blitz Academy; BlitzTech
- Website: www.blitzgames.com

Blitz Games Studios Limited was a British video game developer based in Leamington Spa. Founded in 1990 by the Oliver Twins, who ran the company until its closure in 2013, it is best known for producing licensed games for properties such as The Fairly OddParents, Bratz, SpongeBob SquarePants, and The Biggest Loser, as well as entries in the Karaoke Revolution series. The company was initially named Dizzy Enterprises, then Interactive Studios, until it was finally changed to Blitz Games in 2000, as the company believed the Interactive Studios name was too generic.

== Divisions ==
=== Blitz Games ===
Blitz Games (originally Interactive Studios until 2000) created the games that the company first became well known for: family titles, often licensed on popular characters and existing intellectual property.

=== Blitz Arcade ===
Blitz Arcade was founded in 2006 with a team of 35 people. It was focused on developing downloadable titles of a small scope. Its first release was an advergame series created for the US Burger King chain. After that, Blitz Arcade turned its focus to downloadable titles and had success with its first game of this type: SpongeBob SquarePants: Underpants Slam. They also developed shooter PowerUp Forever, puzzler Droplitz and the 3DTV-compatible beat 'em up Invincible Tiger: The Legend of Han Tao.

=== Volatile Games ===
Volatile Games was responsible for the company's mature games. The division dates from 2005. The company and the division ended in 2013.

Video games created by this division include Reservoir Dogs, runner-up in the 2006 BAFTA awards for Best Soundtrack. Despite allowing the player to complete the game without firing a single shot, the game was considered so realistic in its depictions of violence that it was banned in Australia. They released Dead to Rights: Retribution on 27 April 2010. A proposed game, Possession, was put on hold in 2007.

=== TruSim ===
TruSim was the serious games division. The idea was to bring commitment to training through video games. It is best known for its work on medical-related training programs including the award-winning Interactive Trauma Trainer.

=== BlitzTech ===
BlitzTech created and licensed the game development engine and toolchain.

=== Earlier divisions ===
==== Virtual Experience Company ====
Past projects include the Tintern Abbey virtual tour. The company was acquired by Blitz Games at the end of 2006 but was sold back to former owner Mike Gogan in May 2009.

==== Blitz 1UP ====
In 2008 Blitz Games Studios launched the Blitz1UP programme to help independent developers bring their games to market. The programme provided free help and advice on all aspects of game production as well as crowd sourced QA. The programme was closed in 2011 and was replaced by IndieCity, an online indie game marketplace.

== Games ==
Games created or published by Interactive Studios/Blitz Games Studios include:

Title	Year	Platform(s)	Publisher(s)
As Interactive Studios
Firo & Klawd	1996	PlayStation, Windows, MS-DOS	BMG Interactive
WarGames: Defcon 1	1998	PlayStation, Windows	MGM Interactive, Electronic Arts
Glover	1998	Nintendo 64, PlayStation, Windows	Hasbro Interactive
Action Man: Mission Xtreme	1999	PlayStation	Hasbro Interactive
As Blitz Games
The Little Mermaid II: Return to the Sea	2000	PlayStation	THQ, Sony Computer Entertainment
Frogger 2: Swampy's Revenge	2000	PlayStation, Dreamcast, Windows	Hasbro Interactive
Chicken Run	2000	PlayStation, Dreamcast, Windows, Game Boy Color	Eidos Interactive
Action Man: Destruction X	2000	PlayStation	The 3DO Company
Action Man: Destruction X	2001	Windows	Infogrames
The Mummy Returns	2001	PlayStation 2	Universal Interactive Studios
Cubix - Robots for Everyone: Race 'N Robots	2001	PlayStation, Game Boy Color	The 3DO Company
Fuzion Frenzy	2001	Xbox	Microsoft Game Studios
Cubix - Robots for Everyone: Clash 'N Bash	2002	Game Boy Advance	The 3DO Company
Lilo & Stitch: Trouble in Paradise	2002	PlayStation, Windows	Sony Computer Entertainment, Disney Interactive
Taz: Wanted	2002	PlayStation 2, Xbox, GameCube, Windows	Infogrames
Zapper: One Wicked Cricket	2002	PlayStation 2, Xbox, GameCube, Windows	Infogrames
Cubix Robots for Everyone: Showdown	2003	PlayStation 2, GameCube	The 3DO Company
The Fairly OddParents: Breakin' Da Rules	2003	PlayStation 2, Xbox, GameCube	THQ
Barbie Horse Adventures: Wild Horse Rescue	2003	PlayStation 2, Xbox	Vivendi Universal Games
Bad Boys: Miami Takedown	2004	PlayStation 2, Xbox, GameCube, Windows	Empire Interactive, Crave Entertainment
The Fairly OddParents: Shadow Showdown	2004	PlayStation 2, GameCube	THQ
Bratz: Rock Angelz	2005	PlayStation 2, GameCube	THQ
Pac-Man World 3	2005	PlayStation 2, Xbox, GameCube, Windows, PlayStation Portable	Namco Hometek, Electronic Arts
Reservoir Dogs	2006	PlayStation 2, Xbox, Windows	Eidos Interactive
Bratz: Forever Diamondz	2006	PlayStation 2, GameCube	THQ
SpongeBob SquarePants: Creature from the Krusty Krab	2006	PlayStation 2, Wii, GameCube	THQ
Sneak King	2006	Xbox, Xbox 360	King Games
PocketBike Racer	2006	Xbox, Xbox 360	King Games
Big Bumpin'	2006	Xbox, Xbox 360	King Games
Karaoke Revolution Presents: American Idol	2007	PlayStation 2	Konami
Bratz: The Movie	2007	PlayStation 2, Wii	THQ
SpongeBob's Atlantis SquarePantis	2007	PlayStation 2, Wii	THQ
SpongeBob SquarePants: Underpants Slam	2007	Xbox 360	THQ
Karaoke Revolution Presents: American Idol Encore	2008	PlayStation 2, PlayStation 3, Xbox 360, Wii	Konami
Project Aftermath	2008	Windows	Blitz 1UP
Tak and the Guardians of Gross	2008	PlayStation 2, Wii	THQ
Bratz: Girlz Really Rock	2008	PlayStation 2, Wii	THQ
Are You Smarter Than a 5th Grader? Make the Grade	2008	Xbox 360	THQ
Karaoke Revolution Presents: American Idol Encore 2	2008	PlayStation 3, Xbox 360, Wii	Konami
Buccaneer: The Pursuit of Infamy	2008	Windows	Blitz Arcade
PowerUp Forever	2008	PlayStation 3, Xbox 360	Namco Bandai Games
Droplitz	2009	PlayStation 3, Xbox 360, Windows, iOS	Atlus USA
Invincible Tiger: The Legend of Han Tao	2009	PlayStation 3, Xbox 360	Namco Bandai Games
KrissX	2009	Windows, Mac	Blitz Arcade
iCarly	2009	Wii	Activision
Are You Smarter Than a 5th Grader? Game Time	2009	Xbox 360	THQ
Karaoke Revolution	2009	PlayStation 3, Xbox 360, Wii	Konami
The Biggest Loser	2009	Wii	THQ
Fluttabyes	2010	Windows	Blitz 1UP
Clover: A Curious Tale	2010	Xbox 360, Windows	Blitz Arcade
Mole Control	2010	Windows	Blitz 1UP
All Star Karate	2010	Wii	THQ
Dead to Rights: Retribution	2010	PlayStation 3, Xbox 360	Namco Bandai Games
The Biggest Loser Challenge	2010	Wii	THQ
The Biggest Loser: Ultimate Workout	2010	Xbox 360	THQ
SFG Soccer: Football Fever	2010	Windows	Blitz 1UP
Droplitz Delight	2010	iOS, Android	GameHouse
Your Doodles Are Bugged!	2011	Windows	Blitz 1UP
Yoostar 2	2011	PlayStation 3, Xbox 360, Windows, Mac	Yoostar Entertainment Group
Fantastic Pets	2011	Xbox 360	THQ
SpongeBob's Surf & Skate Roadtrip	2011	Xbox 360	THQ
Michael Phelps: Push the Limit	2011	Xbox 360	505 Games
Puss in Boots	2011	PlayStation 3, Xbox 360, Wii	THQ
Kumo Lumo	2012	iOS	Chillingo
Epic Mickey 2: The Power of Two	2012	PlayStation 3, Xbox 360, Wii, Windows, PlayStation Vita	Disney Interactive Studios
Paper Titans	2013	iOS	Blitz Games
Shrek Alarm	2013	iOS	Blitz Games

== Awards ==
2007

- Nickelodeon Kids' Choice Awards 2007 - Favourite Videogame – SpongeBob SquarePants: Creature from the Krusty Krab
- Edge award for Training and Development of young people
- ICT Excellence in Skills
- Blitz Games wins Develop Industry Excellence Award for Business Development
- Cannes Titanium Grand Prix Award for the Burger King games
- Golden Clio Award for Burger King games

2006

- Blitz Games CEO Philip Oliver named Best Industry Player by TIGA
- Warwickshire Employer of Choice Awards 2006 for creating an exceptional working environment .

== Closure ==
On 12 September 2013, the company announced that it was closing after 23 years of business. The closure came as a result of the company struggling to raise money to support future development projects, with the demise of THQ, a major client, said by Philip Oliver to have hit the company particularly hard. The company is reported to have owed £2.2 million to staff and creditors.

The Oliver brothers along with the former company's COO Richard Smithies almost immediately formed a new company, Radiant Worlds, in the same town, and were reported to have recruited up to 50 former Blitz staff.
