= Pro Manager =

1984 video game

- Developer: The Avalon Hill Game Company
- Publishers: The Avalon Hill Game Company; Spinnaker Software
- Platform: MS-DOS
- Release: 1984

Pro Manager is a baseball management video game published in 1984 for MS-DOS by The Avalon Hill Game Company. It was later published as Major League Manager by Spinnaker Software.

== Gameplay ==
Pro Manager is a game in which the baseball team manager can get a statistical profile for any player showing their previous performances, compile the full statistics of league leaders, compute the league standings from team records, and compile a printout for all league statistics.

== Reception ==
Johnny Wilson reviewed the game for Computer Gaming World, and stated that "Major League Manager probably plays the quickest of the products reviewed in this article, but I can't help feeling that this is because you can't make as many decisions in order to affect the outcome as you can in the other games."
