= The Bugs Bunny Cartoon Workshop =

1990 animation software

- DOS Cover art
- Developer: Novotrade
- Publisher: Hi Tech Expressions
- Platform: MS-DOS
- Release: 1990
- Genre: Home
- Mode: Single-player

The Bugs Bunny Cartoon Workshop is a 1990 video game published by Hi Tech Expressions. Amiga and Macintosh versions were planned but were never released.

== Gameplay ==
The Bugs Bunny Cartoon Workshop is a computer animation software package for teaching how to create animated videos. The user assembles animated cartoons by choosing a stage, adding static or moving backgrounds, placing props, and selecting characters such as Bugs Bunny, Daffy Duck, or the Road Runner, each of whom comes with preset actions that can be positioned, edited, or directed across scenes; the user defines how long actions run and how fast their frames play, adds transitions like fades, incorporates sound effects, music, and customizable text bubbles, and then arranges, duplicates, or inserts scenes to build a complete presentation that can be saved, shared, or shown as a standalone cartoon.

== Reception ==
Roy Wagner reviewed the program for Computer Gaming World, and said that "for quick and easy animations, The Bugs Bunny Cartoon Workshop is highly recommended (especially for children and beginners). It is possible to actually create some very funny cartoons and just playing with the program's options is very satisfying". Previously, Computer Gaming World called The Bugs Bunny Cartoon Workshop a “poor man's version” of The Disney Animation Studio". Compute! found that The Bugs Bunny Cartoon Workshop offers good value for your money.
