= Mystic Towers =

1994 video game

- Developer(s): Animation F/X
- Publisher(s): AU: Manaccom; WW: Apogee Software
- Designer(s): Lindsay Whipp
- Platform(s): MS-DOS, Windows, Mac OS
- Release: July 15, 1994
- Genre(s): Role-playing, platform
- Mode(s): Single-player

Mystic Towers is an isometric platform game developed by Animation F/X, and published in 1994 by Manaccom domestically and Apogee Software internationally. Originally exclusive to MS-DOS compatible operating systems, it was re-released on Steam in 2015 with Microsoft Windows and Mac OS support. It stars Baron Baldric, an old wizard with a magic staff and an array of amusing mannerisms, who must quest through twelve towers and rid them of monsters. Mystic Towers is a sequel to Baron Baldric: A Grave Adventure, a platform game in which Baron Baldric battled an evil sorcerer ancestor.

== Gameplay ==
Each tower consists of 45 rooms (5 floors with 9 rooms each), 15 monsters, and 1 monster generator. In each tower, Baldric must defeat all the monsters, destroy the monster generator, and obtain the Large Red Tower Key that opens the tower entrance.

Baron Baldric has a health bar showing his hit points, which decrease as Baldric takes damage from monsters, is poisoned, or steps on traps. When his health meter runs out, Baldric loses a life. He begins with nine lives in reserve (one life in Practice Mode), and gains more with every 10,000 points he earns. Points are earned by collecting treasure.

Baldric must consume enough food and drink to avoid starvation and thirst. If his food or drink bars reach zero, Baron Baldric slowly loses life until the bar is replenished. Otherwise, Baldric's health slowly recharges over time. Food can be found in a variety of places, and some monsters can be eaten after they are killed. Drinks come in bottles and flasks, as well as water fountains. Some bottles contain wine, which makes Baron Baldric intoxicated (characterised by spinning and hiccuping) for a short while.

Baron Baldric can become poisoned by stepping on a poison tile, drinking slime, or getting hit by a venom cloud. Baron Baldric slowly loses health when poisoned. To cure poison, the player can use a heal spell, drink slime from outlets, or eat a mushroom. If Baron Baldric eats a mushroom when he is not poisoned, he dies instantly.

There are 6 towers in the game. Each tower has an "Apprentice" version, which Baldric visits on the first half of his quest, and a "Wizard" version, which he visits on the second. In Wizard towers, Baldric does not start with maps of each floor, the monsters are significantly stronger and faster, teleporters do not link in a ring but direct, the Red Tower Key is not in the starting room, and there are new classes of obstacles to overcome.

Baldric starts each tower afresh, with his food, drink, and health bars all refilled, and his inventory of spells and coins lost. Only his extra lives and score are carried over.

The game's "Practice Mode" is the opposite of what its name suggests, an extra difficult mode suited only to those who have already mastered the game's mechanics. In this mode, players select a single tower to play through, with both apprentice and wizard versions of all the towers available. All the same dangers are present as in the story mode, but the player has only one extra life and cannot save their game.

=== Spells ===
There are a total of ten spells in the game. The first five are damage spells (Ice, Sulphur, Venom Cloud, Fireball and Lightning) for killing monsters and differ from each other only in the specific amount of damage they do and the fact that Ice has unlimited ammunition. The other five spells (Reveal, Heal, Teleport, Levitate, and Bomb) are utility spells. The Reveal spell lights up dark rooms, and reveals hidden doors, treasure, and poison tiles. The Heal Spell restores Baldric's health and cures poison. Teleport can only be used on a teleport pad, which transports him to the floor indicated by the number on the pad. Levitate makes Baldric float one level higher, and can be stacked. Baron Baldric can return to the ground by jumping. Finally, the Bomb can be cast only on a monster generator, as part of the criteria of completing the level.

Coins can be collected to purchase spells. The higher the floor of the tower in which a spell is purchased, the more powerful the spell generally is. Although all the spells except Ice are collectable, only the damage spells are purchasable.

Several monsters can cast spells, with seemingly no limits. Venom Cloud has the ability to poison Baron Baldric, and Lightning can kill in two hits.

=== Power-ups ===
There are three types of power-ups, all of which last a limited amount of time:

- Meta-power greatly boosts the power of Baron Baldric's currently equipped spell.
- Invisibility makes Baron Baldric invisible. Monsters will not attack Baron Baldric unless they run into him, and auto-fire rooms (rooms that sense the presence of Baldric and fire) will not activate.
- Shields make Baldric invulnerable. Monsters will not attack, and Baldric is immune to poison tiles, traps and fire. He can still be poisoned from drinking slime and killed from eating a poisonous mushroom when not poisoned.
