= Midway Campaign =

1980 video game

- Developer: Avalon Hill
- Publisher: Microcomputer Games
- Platforms: Apple II, Atari 8-bit, Commodore 64, Commodore PET, TRS-80, VIC-20, MS-DOS
- Release: 1980
- Genre: Computer wargame
- Mode: Single-player

Midway Campaign is a computer wargame released by Avalon Hill in 1980. It is a text-based game written in BASIC.

== Gameplay ==
The game reenacts the events between June 4 and June 7, 1942, during the Battle of Midway, which was the turning point for Allied Forces in the Pacific Theater.

Gameplay is turn-based with each turn representing one hour of the battle. Players control Task Force 16, comprising the Enterprise and Hornet aircraft carriers, and Task Force 17 comprising Yorktown, and Midway Island.

Each task force may be moved on a map in any direction by providing a direction in degrees. During each turn Consolidated PBY Catalinas scout out the location of the enemy task force comprising Akagi, Kaga, Soryu, and Hiryu.

Once a Task Force has been identified and are within range a strike group may be launched from neighboring ships. Planes are generally in three conditions throughout the game. They can be below deck (protected from enemy strikes), on deck arming for a strike, or in the air moving towards or away from a target. Fighters (F4F Wildcats or A6M Zero 'Zekes') can also be established in a combat air patrol (CAP) to protect their carrier.

The game ends when either sides carriers are all lost, or if one of the task forces leave the map.

== Reception ==
Glenn Mai reviewed Midway Campaign in The Space Gamer No. 45. Mai commented that "Overall this is a very good game, and I highly recommend it for anyone who likes matching wits with the computer."
