= The Mind-Benders (1967 film) =

The Mind-Benders: LSD and the Hallucinogens
- Directed by: Lee R. Bobker
- Narrated by: Michael Tolan
- Edited by: Morton Fuchs
- Music by: Michael Shapiro
- Production company: Vision Associates
- Distributed by: FDA Bureau of Drug Abuse Control
- Release date: 1967
- Running time: 26-1/2 minutes
- Country: United States
- Language: English

The Mind-Benders is an educational antidrug documentary film concerning hallucinogens produced for the United States Food and Drug Administration in 1967. It "explores the potential therapeutic uses and the known hazards of LSD and other hallucinogens, as well as some of the motivations of abusers". The color 16 mm film was made available from Bureau of Drug Abuse Control field offices and from the FDA National Medical Audiovisual Center. The government's description states that it contains "graphics that suggest a hallucinogenic experience, snippets of interviews with users (who explain their reasons for taking the drug) and doctors, and taped sessions of research with volunteers, the film delves into the destructive as well as possible positive uses of the drug".

According to some academics, the policies pursued by the government including this and other anti-drug films, "structured social experience [of users]...in such a way as to generate experiences defined as bad trips".

The film was recommended for school curricula by government and non-government authorities, and was used in some U.S. schools.

== See also ==
- List of drug films
- Marijuana (1968 film), a 1968 anti-drug documentary from the same time period
