= Exotic material =

Unusual material in terms of materials science

Exotic materials are minerals and metals that have uncommon characteristics, such as high strength, hardness, density, durability or radioactivity. It does not mean any material that is rare per se, but rather one that is exceptional in its physical or mechanical characteristics. Exotic materials are used for high performance tasks such as aerospace engineering, armour, cutting tools and nuclear technology, where ordinary materials may fail under stress, heat, wear, corrosion or impact.

== Exotic metals and minerals ==
Examples of metals and minerals that can be exotic:

- Cobalt
- Coltan
- Diamonds
- Platinum
- Titanium
- Tungsten or Wolframite
- Uranium

Materials with high alloy content, known as super alloys or exotic alloys, offer enhanced performance properties including excellent strength and durability, and resistance to oxidation, corrosion and deforming at high temperatures or under extreme pressure. Because of these properties, super alloys make the best spring materials for demanding working conditions, which can be encountered across various industry sectors, including the automotive, marine and aerospace sectors as well as oil and gas extraction, thermal processing, petrochemical processing and power generation.

== See also ==
- Exotic matter
