= Chicken Run (video game) =

2000 video game

- European cover art of PlayStation version
- Developer: Blitz Games
- Publishers: Eidos Interactive; THQ (Note: Game Boy Color version only)
- Producer: Patrick Cowan
- Programmer: R. Fred Williams
- Composer: Rob Lord
- Platforms: Game Boy Color, Dreamcast, PlayStation, Microsoft Windows
- Release: Game Boy Color, Dreamcast, PlayStation: NA: 2 November 2000 (GBC); NA: 13 November 2000; EU: 24 November 2000; Windows: EU: 15 December 2000; NA: 14 January 2001
- Genres: Platform, stealth
- Mode: Single-player

Chicken Run is a 3D platform-stealth (and in Game Boy Color 2D isometric puzzle-solving) video game based on the 2000 film. Developed by Blitz Games and published by Eidos Interactive and THQ, the game was released prior to the movie's home media release, for the PlayStation, Microsoft Windows, Dreamcast, and Game Boy Color. The game (as well as the movie) is a loose parody of the 1963 film The Great Escape. The game's plot centers about a band of chickens escaping from an egg farm from their evil owners and fighting for freedom.

While the characters, mainly Ginger and Rocky, are voiced by professional voice artists, Benjamin Whitrow and Lynn Ferguson reprise their respective roles as Fowler and Mac.

== Gameplay ==
The console and PC versions of Chicken Run are 3D stealth-platform game, featuring similar elements to games like Metal Gear Solid. Gameplay generally consists of the player taking control of either Ginger, Rocky, or Nick and Fetcher, and searching the Tweedys' farm for objects to be used in an escape attempt by the chickens. As the player will have to avoid guard dogs and the Tweedys themselves, in addition to searchlights, sources of light in general and noisy surfaces, since these will alert the security to the player's presence.

Should the player get caught, they are sent back to the entry point of the current area, and lose either their most recently obtained item or their currently equipped item which goes back to where it was found. In addition, the player occasionally have to push objects about, or use the environment to get to a hard-to-reach item.

The game is divided into 3 acts; each act ends with a boss level. In Act 1, the chickens have to control a mannequin of Mrs Tweedy. The Act 2 boss is a linear platforming level where Rocky has to avoid hazards to get to Ginger in the pie machine. The same act contain minigames representing an escape attempt, which in Act 2 involves launching chickens over the fence with a seesaw, catapult or fireworks. In the Act 3 boss the chickens fly the 'Old Crate' and have to stop Mrs. Tweedy from reaching the top of the rope hanging from it. The minigames involve assembling a part of the 'Old Crate' and getting its engine running. Act 3 contains a minigame in which the player has to get the hens in Hut 2 to lay eggs to pay Nick and Fetcher though this can also be played in the first two acts but without the player getting to keep the eggs.

Success is generally measured by how many chickens the player can save, or how fast the player can finish the task and the player is awarded with bronze, silver or gold medals by Fowler for good performance.

=== Game Boy Color version ===
In the Game Boy Color version, the player controls Ginger, who has to lure the chickens to the exit of each level using corn while avoiding the dogs and searchlights in the chicken coop and the magic eyes and laser beams in the pie machine within the time limits. Upon completing a level, the player is awarded medals by Fowler which act as the password to access the next level should the player turn off the console before reaching it. New items are made available as the player progresses through the game.

== Plot ==
In keeping with the film's story, the game takes place on an English chicken farm and follows a group of chickens as they try to break out of confinement.

Players must help Ginger and her flock make a break for freedom, while avoiding the evil Mrs. Tweedy and her oafish husband Mr. Tweedy, who wants to turn them into chicken pies.

== Reception ==
Reception

Aggregate scores
Aggregator	Score			
Aggregator	Dreamcast	GBC	PC	PS
GameRankings	63%	53%	60%	69%
Metacritic	68/100	N/A	59/100	75/100

Review scores
Publication	Score			
Publication	Dreamcast	GBC	PC	PS
AllGame	3.5/5	1.5/5	N/A	3/5
CNET Gamecenter	4/10	N/A	N/A	N/A
Computer Games Strategy Plus	N/A	N/A	2.5/5	N/A
Computer Gaming World	N/A	N/A	3/5	N/A
Electronic Gaming Monthly	N/A	5.5/10	N/A	4/10
EP Daily	N/A	N/A	N/A	7.5/10
Eurogamer	N/A	N/A	N/A	6/10
Game Informer	6/10	4/10	N/A	N/A
GameSpot	5.2/10	N/A	5.1/10	5.3/10
IGN	7.2/10	6/10	7.1/10	7/10
Next Generation	3/5	N/A	N/A	N/A
Nintendo Power	N/A	6.4/10	N/A	N/A
Official U.S. PlayStation Magazine	N/A	N/A	N/A	3/5
PC Zone	N/A	N/A	59%	N/A

The PlayStation version received "generally favourable reviews", while the Dreamcast and PC versions received "mixed or average reviews", according to the review aggregation website Metacritic.

Kevin Rice of NextGen said of the Dreamcast version: "This is a surprisingly good conversion of a movie into a game. It's graphically brilliant in its similarities to the movie, and the gameplay is smart." Four-Eyed Dragon of GamePro said that the same console version "plays as perfectly as the hilarious movie of the same name, but with its frustrating controls, you, too, may feel trapped in a pen." (Note: GamePro gave the Dreamcast version 4.5/5 for graphics, 4/5 for sound, and two 3/5 scores for control and fun factor.)
