= Medieval Warriors =

1991 strategy video game

- Developer: Merit Software
- Publisher: Merit Software
- Designer: Scott Lamb
- Platforms: Amiga, MS-DOS
- Release: NA: 1991
- Genre: Turn-based strategy
- Mode: Single-player

Medieval Warriors is a video game released by Merit Software in 1991 for Amiga and MS-DOS. It is a turn-based strategy game with an isometric view.

== Gameplay ==
Each map has 4 scenarios where the 2 teams are set up in different starting arrangements. The match starts with 12 warriors on each side and each turn you can move each unit once and attack with each unit once. Each unit has at least one of 4 weapons: a throwing knife, a throwing axe, an arrow and a sword. The sword is the only melee weapon— the rest are ranged. The damage and range of each weapon is different for each fighter.

The game is won by killing all enemy units.
