= Mortal Coil: Adrenalin Intelligence =

1995 first-person shooter video game

- Developer(s): Crush Software
- Publisher(s): Virgin Interactive Entertainment
- Platform(s): MS-DOS
- Release: 1995
- Genre(s): First-person shooter
- Mode(s): Single player

Mortal Coil: Adrenalin Intelligence is a first-person shooter developed by Crush and released in 1995 by Virgin Interactive Entertainment. The game featured a tactical element where the player would control four different characters and plan their movement either by moving them in real-time, or through a planning perspective similar to Rainbow Six.

== Reception ==
Reception

Review scores
Publication	Score
Joystick	82%
PC Zone	50%
PC Player (DE)	61%
Power Play	19%

Mortal Coil received mixed reviews upon release. Chris Anderson of PC Zone highlighted the multiple character concept and "massive" levels, but faulted the game's "awful" and "unimaginative" graphical presentation, "sluggish" movement and voiceovers. Joystick wrote that "with a more efficient 3D engine, Mortal Coil could have been a very good game". The German edition of PC Player commended the game for "offering something new", but found the game to be "outdated and lacking in detail" in its graphics and encountered several bugs. Power Play described the game as "disappointing" due to its "below-average presentation", lack of strategy and poor translations.
