= Manic Karts =

1995 racing video game

- Developer: Manic Media Productions
- Publisher: Virgin Interactive
- Platform: MS-DOS
- Release: EU: 1995; US: 1996
- Genre: Kart racing

Manic Karts is a kart racing game developed by British studio Manic Media Productions and published by Virgin Interactive for MS-DOS in 1995.

== Gameplay ==
Manic Karts is a game in which players use their earnings from winning league races to improve their carts.

== Reception ==
Next Generation reviewed the PC version of the game, rating it one star out of five, and stated that "it's strange to come across a racing title that so obviously can't compare [...] a real clunker. Avoid it at all costs."
