= Rollerblade Racer =

1993 video game

- NES cover art
- Developer(s): Designer Software; Radiance Software (NES); Tahoe Software Productions (DOS)
- Publisher(s): Hi Tech Expressions
- Composer(s): Bill Bogenreif
- Platform(s): NES; MS-DOS
- Release: NES: NA: February 1993
- Genre(s): Alternative sports (inline skating)
- Mode(s): Single-player

Rollerblade Racer is a video game where the player's goal is to win the "super rollerblade challenge". The game was released for both the Nintendo Entertainment System and MS-DOS.

== Gameplay ==
Players will first need to qualify by earning 5,000 points and completing several obstacle courses. These points are earned by performing stunts on suburbs, city streets, beaches, and parks. Additional points are earned by completing the course under the time limit. The main character is Kirk, who brags about purchasing a new pair of rollerskates.
