= Muzzle Velocity (video game) =

1997 video game

- Developer: Code Fusion
- Publisher: Digi4fun
- Platform: MS-DOS
- Release: 1997
- Genre: Strategy
- Mode: Single-player

Muzzle Velocity is a computer wargame released by Digi4fun in 1997. The program is a hybrid of standard two-dimension map-based tactical gaming, and first-person action. It is set in World War II. The game was developed by Code Fusion and Digi4Fun.

== Development ==
The game was in development for two years.

== Reception ==
Reception

Review scores
Publication	Score
GameSpot	5.2/10
Computer Games Magazine	3/5
Computer Gaming World	3/5

Computer Gaming World gave the game a score of 3 out of 5 stating "Gamers suffer from wanting to be both officers and grunts simultaneously: Most strategy games that attempt to address both aspects fail to properly balance the two points of view. Yet, the latest entry in this genre, MUZZLE VELOCITY, is so enthusiastic that it largely succeeds despite some flaws"

Richard Moore from The Age stated "Muzzle Velocity is a very good buy. But remember, if the strategic side of the game gets too much, hit enter and indulge in a bit of shooting 'em up"
