= John Tarnoff =

American film producer

John Tarnoff (born 1952) is a coach who provides career counseling for late career professionals.

A 40-year veteran of the Los Angeles entertainment industry, Tarnoff's career hit a wall at age 50. The tech startup he had co-founded was wiped out by the bursting of the dot-com "bubble," and like many late career, baby boomer professionals in similar circumstances, felt uncertain and adrift in his career. He decided to go back to school and earned a master's degree in spiritual psychology. Tarnoff then became head of show development at DreamWorks Animation. from 2006 – 2009.

In 2010, he joined the Carnegie Mellon University Heinz College Masters of Entertainment Industry Management program, as a professor and head of industry relations. He has also consulted for the Academy of Motion Picture Arts & Sciences, the Australian Film, TV & Radio School, the ACME Network, a digital distance learning company, and The Boeing Company.

In 2012, he launched his Boomer Reinvention career coaching program to support late career baby boomers looking to start sustainable second act or encore careers beyond traditional retirement. He is the author of the book: "Boomer Reinvention: How to Create Your Dream Career after 50" (Reinvention Press, Los Angeles 2017).

Tarnoff began his career in the mid-1970s working as a literary agent, and then as a film studio production executive and film producer. In these capacities, he was responsible for films including Diner, The Year of Living Dangerously, Pink Floyd The Wall, Bill & Ted's Excellent Adventure and The Power of One. A co-founder of Village Roadshow Pictures in 1988, he pioneered U.S./Australian co-productions in the late 1980s and early 1990s executive producing a handful of films including The Delinquents and Prisoners of the Sun.

Branching into multimedia development in 1994, he licensed the interactive rights to Orwell's Nineteen Eighty-Four and produced the video game Big Brother based on the book. He and director John Badham co-wrote the PC/PlayStation game WarGames, based on Badham's movie.

From 1995 to 2003, with writer and artist Robit Hairman, he co-founded Talkie, Inc., a technology company that created online conversational animated characters for marketing, brand building, lead generation, customer service and training. Talkie created "Claire," Sprint PCS' automated customer service rep.

Tarnoff holds a B.A. from Amherst College, and a M.A. in Spiritual Psychology from the University of Santa Monica. He grew up in New York and Paris, and lives in Los Angeles.
