= Mega Man (1990 video game) =

DOS action-platform game

- Developer: Rozner Labs
- Publishers: Hi Tech Expressions; Capcom
- Designer: Stephen Rozner
- Series: Mega Man
- Platform: DOS
- Release: 1990
- Genres: Action, platform
- Mode: Single-player

Mega Man is an action-platform video game that was developed by Stephen Rozner, an ex-employee of Capcom U.S.A, and published in 1990 by Hi Tech Expressions for DOS systems. It is the first game in the Mega Man franchise to be released for home computers.

The game had a negative critical response; many reviewers called it one of the worst PC games ever. Despite this, a sequel titled Mega Man 3: The Robots Are Revolting was released in 1992.

== Gameplay ==
Gameplay of Mega Man

In Mega Man, "Masters" Dyna Man, Sonic Man, and Volt Man can be selected. In each level, the player-character Mega Man fights enemies and obstacles before facing the level's "Robot Master" boss at the level's end.

== Development ==
Stephen Rozner developed Mega Man under his company Rozner Labs. Rozner had previous experience working with a Capcom intellectual property, having ported Street Fighter to the Commodore 64. Capcom U.S.A., Inc. purchased Riggs International, a small video-game development company consisting of Rozner as artist and CEO, which it intended to use as an internal development studio but the plan failed and Rozner was tasked with managing external developers. During this time, Rozner began work on Mega Man.

During development, Rozner left Capcom U.S.A., which allowed Rozner to release the game when it was finished. Rozner was unable to access Capcom's asset files and assembly code, so he decided to start from nothing and make "whatever he wanted" because he was a fan of the original NES Mega Man games. Mega Man was released for DOS in 1990.

== Reception ==
Video-game critics gave Mega Man a negative reception; many called it one of the worst PC games of all time. PC Gamer listed the game on its list of the worst PC ports ever, calling it a "monstrous conversion" and a "terrible port". The game also appeared on USGamer's list of the worst games on the Internet Archive, calling the level designs "uninspired" and the lack of music "the worst part". 1UP.com's Nadia Oxford listed it as one of the worst games in the Mega Man franchise. Jeremy Parish of Polygon ranked it as the worst game in the main series, calling it "a half-baked, unbalanced, hideous-looking game". Christian Nutt and Justin Speer for GameSpot called the game's controls and graphics "abysmal".

Neil Foster of Hardcore Gaming 101 gave the game a negative review; while he found the addition of Enhanced Graphics Adapter visuals to be a plus, he found the graphics overall to be lacking in imagination when compared to the NES Mega Man games. He also panned the gameplay, which he called "dull" and "cheap", and said the level design makes it "drag", and that "everything hits too hard and there's little mercy invincibility in-between", leading to quick deaths. Foster added the game's enemies are too short to shoot and that narrow passages with low ceilings make jumping difficult. Foster also panned the controls, saying they make the game more difficult than it needs to be and noted some of the game's art assets were stolen and used in Duke Nukem. In his book "The Untold History of Japanese Game Developers", John Szczepaniak was less negative towards the game, considering it to be not as bad as fans of the series say it is.

== Sequel ==
Stephen Rozner and his brother William Rozer developed a sequel titled Mega Man 3: The Robots Are Revolting, (Note: As referred to in-game, the box art just titles it Mega Man 3.) which was released in 1992 on DOS. The game began as an unrelated game called Eco Man and featured a character wearing a hazmat suit exploring polluted land. Hi-Tech Expressions, however, said it would only be published if it was reskinned into a Mega Man game to appeal to more buyers, leaving the game with its environmental theme. The sequel was titled Mega Man 3 rather than Mega Man 2 because one of the game's Robot Masters resembles Spark Man on the box art.
