= Millennia: Altered Destinies =

1995 video game

- Box art
- Developer: Take-Two Interactive
- Publisher: Take-Two Interactive
- Platform: MS-DOS
- Release: September 1995
- Genre: Strategy
- Mode: Single-player

Millennia: Altered Destinies is a PC game created by Take 2 Interactive in 1995. It casts the player as a human freighter captain who finds himself transported to an alien ship. There, an alien calling himself a Hood gives the player a mission to save the Echelon galaxy which is about to be taken over by a malevolent race called the Microids. Apparently, the Milky Way is next should the player fail.

The only way to stop the Microids is to travel back 10,000 years in a specially designed ship called XTM. It is equipped with everything the player will need to complete the mission. The player must then populate the Echelon galaxy with four indigenous races and ensure their development into powerful spacefaring civilizations.

The Hoods also state that this is not the first time they have tried to interfere with the timeline. To succeed, the player will have to fight off the previous attempts by the Hoods to alter the course of history.

== Gameplay ==
The Microids are too powerful for the player to deal with directly. The only way is to pick four planets in the galaxy and colonise them with the four races the player is given. The player is given four "seeds" – morphs genetically engineered by the Hoods to guide the races and communicate with the player. Without a seed, the player cannot affect the target civilization. Each race (Reptoids, Slothoids, Entomons, and Piscines) get one seed. Their lifespan is at least 10,000 years old. The seeds will generally cooperate with the player, but are loyal to their respective races and aware that the player is not a god, so will not always. The player must guide the four races through various crises that would either destroy them or cause them to stagnate, so that they will eventually develop space travel and weapons able to defeat the Microids.

XTM is a completely self-sufficient craft equipped with an extensive historical database spanning 10,000 years which the player must use to "look ahead" on the consequences of temporal changes. The time periods are split up into centuries. Every time a "temporal storm" occurs (i.e. an event has been changed), the database is updated. XTM is not defenseless, it is equipped with a powerful energy cannon capable of fighting off entire fleets, and can be upgraded with technology provided by the four races once the player has shepherded them to a high enough technology level. While the player can lose in space combat, the ship's computer ANGUS will emergency jump to the safe haven of the planet Axis if XTM sustains too much damage, so the player will never be destroyed. ANGUS is also capable of translating the four races' languages into English and vice versa. Travelling through space and time and space combat require enormous amounts of energy, and the player must frequently refuel by sling shotting around gas giants.

=== Affecting History ===
There are 4 basic ways to alter history in Millennia:

- Communication – using XTM's communication array to contact the seed on a race's homeworld will allow the player to make suggestions and/or give orders to the seed which will usually affect the race's development. Most of the time, this is only possible during a crisis.
- Teleportation – XTM is equipped with a teleporter, allowing objects to be transported to the ship from the temple on the planet. Every time a new technology is discovered, it is brought to the temple to check with their deity (the player) if they are worthy of it. If the player takes the technology, it disappears from that race's history. The technology can then be reintroduced to the race by teleporting it back to the temple (not necessarily in the same time period; moving technological breakthroughs a few centuries earlier is a key method of accelerating a race's development). A planetary shield does not block teleportation. Once a race becomes advanced enough (IQ of 300), a blueprint of an XTM component can be teleported to the planet so that the race can build it. The 4 devices can then be used to return to our galaxy.
- Ground attack – the ship possesses a lander which is usually used to attack a structure on a planet's surface with lasers. This is a drastic step because it can accidentally (or intentionally) lead to the seed being destroyed. However, in some cases, it is necessary (e.g. to destroy the temple of a priest who will lead a religious war devastating the planet). A race will eventually develop technology to protect its homeworld from Microid invasion, and this technology will also prevent the player from landing on the planet as well.
- Space combat – sometimes a race is threatened by an attack from space, such as a Microid invasion before it develops the technology to repel them, or an attack by other time travellers. The player can directly drive the invasion fleet off in his XTM.

One of the benefits of having a time machine is that if the player fails to change history, or makes it worse, he can usually return to the same time period and try again.

=== Goals ===
While these goals are not specified in the game, they are important stepping stones on the way to victory.

- Apparently, none of the races are capable of surviving on their own. Every time the player manages to fix something, there is another crisis several centuries later that, if unresolved, will destroy the society. The races must be guided to ensure they survive the 10,000 years of history. Often, the crises will involve politics, in which case the player will have to choose sides. If there are multiple nations on the planet, the player must ensure that the nation with the seed must not be destroyed. Usually, these problems are settled by communicating with the seed and suggesting the proper course of action. Politics can also involve the player choosing a leader from two or three candidates, each having different ideas on how to run the government. The player must gauge each race's best form of government and attempt to implement it. The Piscines, for example, are fine with both a monarchy and a democracy, while the hive-minded Entomon must have a queen to survive.
- To successfully defend themselves against the Microids, the races must develop a technology to allow them to fight off invaders from space. This can range from "standard" sci-fi devices like planetary shields and starfighter lasers to underwater chimneys lobbing explosive bricks into orbit. Sometimes, the technology is close to being invented, but the Microids invade just before it's completed. In this case, the player must travel to that century and destroy the invasion fleet, buying the race another 100 years.
- In order to ensure the Microid defeat, the races must develop space travel and begin to colonize other worlds in the Echelon galaxy. Each race's engine technology is different, but a race that develops it first will lead the fight against the Microids and also threaten the other races with invasion. In this case, the player must actually fight the invasion fleet of one race in order to save another. Interstellar wars between two powers are also possible.

=== Victory ===
There are two requirements to achieve victory in Millennia.

- Each race must achieve an IQ of 300 and produce for you the four parts required to make the trip back to Earth.
- Make sure each of the four races occupies about a quarter of the Echelon galaxy.

== Characters ==
=== Enemies ===
- The Microids, of course, will eventually try to destroy and/or conquer the four races. You can either try to fight them off yourself, buying one of the races 100 years with every victory, but the only long-term solution is to guide the race to develop technology to fight off the invaders (e.g. planet shield, underwater-to-orbit cannons, spaceship lasers).
- In some cases, you may have to fight the four races, if they attempt to conquer the others.
- The Hoods will usually show up several centuries after a race has been "seeded" to destroy it in their previous attempt to alter history. The only way to get rid of them is to destroy their ships. Once destroyed, they do not bother that race again.
- An alternate version of the player acting on behalf of the Microids in an identical XTM to ensure their domination of the Echelon galaxy. This is the most dangerous opponent as he can appear at any point in the races' histories and cause their destruction, undoing all the player's hard work. The alternate will usually escape after taking a certain amount of damage, but after several encounters he can be destroyed.

== Reception ==
The game received a positive review from Computer Game Review. Ted Chapman of the magazine called it "a game you won't want to miss."
