= Muppet Adventure: Chaos at the Carnival =

1990 The Muppets video game

- NES box art
- Developer(s): Mind's Eye
- Publisher(s): Hi Tech Expressions
- Composer(s): Dennis Intravia
- Series: The Muppets
- Platform(s): Apple II, Commodore 64, MS-DOS, NES
- Release: NA: 1989; NA: November 1990 (NES)
- Genre(s): Action
- Mode(s): Single-player, multiplayer

Muppet Adventure: Chaos at the Carnival is a video game released for the Apple II, Commodore 64, and MS-DOS in 1989 by Hi Tech Expressions. A port to the Nintendo Entertainment System was published in 1990. The game features Muppets created by Jim Henson in a series of carnival-inspired mini games searching for enough keys to rescue Miss Piggy from Dr. Grump. These mini games include: Bumper Cars, Funhouse, Tunnel of Love, Duck Hunt and Space Ride. The game was initially released for the Apple IIc with a bug which caused it to be unwinnable. Upon achieving the win condition versus Dr. Grump, the game would enter an endless cycle of taking the player back to a previous level, instead of having Dr. Grump be defeated.

== NES port ==
The NES version of the game is unique from its computer counterparts in that it has on-screen hearts designating hit detection, but eliminates the two-player mode. The player is required to complete each level with a specific character. The initial levels, which you can complete in any order, are as follows:

- Kermit the Frog rides an inner tube down a river
- Fozzie Bear must escape a Fun House of desserts
- Gonzo flies a spaceship
- Animal drives a bumper car

After completing these initial levels, the player then controls Kermit the Frog, armed with a feather, in Dr. Grump's castle.
