= List of Looking Glass Studios video games =

Video games by developer/publisher

Looking Glass Studios was an American video game developer founded in 1990 as Blue Sky Productions by Paul Neurath in Salem, New Hampshire. The company's first game was Ultima Underworld: The Stygian Abyss in 1992, which received widespread critical acclaim and sold nearly 500,000 units. Looking Glass proceeded to develop titles in multiple genres, including role-playing, sports, flight simulation, and stealth video games. These titles were primarily published by Origin Systems, Electronic Arts and Eidos Interactive, with three titles self-published by Looking Glass Studios.

Looking Glass' products were praised for innovations in video game technology and design. Several of their successes, such as Flight Unlimited and Thief: The Dark Project, sold over half a million copies each. Poor sales of their final two self-published games—Terra Nova: Strike Force Centauri (1996) and British Open Championship Golf (1997)—left the company in financial turmoil, however. This, combined with multiple failed business deals, including a temporary merger with Intermetrics from 1997 to 1999, led the company to close on May 24, 2000, and cancel several projects in development. Its final project, Jane's Attack Squadron, was completed by Mad Doc Software and released by Xicat Interactive in 2002. In total, Looking Glass Studios released 12 original games in its 10 years of activity, alongside several ports and other spin-offs.

== Games ==
Game	Details
Ultima Underworld: The Stygian Abyss Original release dates: NA: March 1992; PAL: 1992; JP: 1993; (FM Towns version)	Release years by system: 1992 – DOS; 1993 – FM Towns; 1997 – PlayStation; 2002 – Windows Mobile
Ultima Underworld: The Stygian Abyss Original release dates: NA: March 1992; PAL: 1992; JP: 1993; (FM Towns version)	Notes: First-person computer role-playing game, set in the fantasy world of the Ultima series; Developed by Blue Sky Productions and published by Origin Systems; Ported in Japan to FM Towns by Origin; Ported to Windows Mobile by ZIO Interactive
John Madden Football '93 Original release dates: NA: December 1992; PAL: December 1992	Release years by system: 1992 – Sega Genesis
John Madden Football '93 Original release dates: NA: December 1992; PAL: December 1992	Notes: Genesis version of John Madden Football '93; Developed by Looking Glass Technologies and published by Electronic Arts
Ultima Underworld II: Labyrinth of Worlds Original release dates: NA: January 1993	Release years by system: 1993 – DOS
Ultima Underworld II: Labyrinth of Worlds Original release dates: NA: January 1993	Notes: Sequel to Ultima Underworld: The Stygian Abyss that continues the first-person computer role-playing game style, in the fantasy world of the Ultima series.; Developed by Looking Glass Technologies and published by Origin Systems
System Shock Original release dates: NA: September 23, 1994; PAL: 1994	Release years by system: 1994 – DOS; 1994 – Macintosh
System Shock Original release dates: NA: September 23, 1994; PAL: 1994	Notes: First-person science fiction game inspired by Ultima Underworld; Originally released on floppy discs; re-released months later on CD-ROM with voice acting; Developed by Looking Glass Technologies and published by Origin Systems
Flight Unlimited Original release dates: NA: June 7, 1995; PAL: June 7, 1995	Release years by system: 1995 – DOS; 1995 – Windows; 1997 – Macintosh
Flight Unlimited Original release dates: NA: June 7, 1995; PAL: June 7, 1995	Notes: Aerobatic flight simulator that uses real-time computational fluid dynamics; The first game self-published by Looking Glass Technologies; A commercial success, with 780,000 units in sales
Terra Nova: Strike Force Centauri Original release dates: NA: March 5, 1996; PAL: 1996	Release years by system: 1996 – DOS
Terra Nova: Strike Force Centauri Original release dates: NA: March 5, 1996; PAL: 1996	Notes: Tactical shooter with squad mechanics and outdoor environments; Looking Glass Technologies' second self-published game; A commercial failure, with 100,000 units in sales
British Open Championship Golf Original release date: NA: April 30, 1997	Release years by system: 1997 – Windows
British Open Championship Golf Original release date: NA: April 30, 1997	Notes: Golf game based on The Open Championship; Third and final self-published game by Looking Glass Technologies; A commercial failure
Flight Unlimited II Original release dates: NA: November 30, 1997; PAL: 1997	Release years by system: 1997 – Windows
Flight Unlimited II Original release dates: NA: November 30, 1997; PAL: 1997	Notes: Sequel to Flight Unlimited, focused on general aviation; Developed by Looking Glass Studios and published by Eidos Interactive
Thief: The Dark Project Original release dates: NA: December 1, 1998; PAL: 1998	Release years by system: 1998 – Windows
Thief: The Dark Project Original release dates: NA: December 1, 1998; PAL: 1998	Notes: A first-person stealth game; Developed by Looking Glass Studios and published by Eidos Interactive; A commercial success, with over 500,000 units in sales
Command & Conquer Original release dates: NA: May 31, 1999; PAL: July 30, 1999	Release years by system: 1999 – Nintendo 64
Command & Conquer Original release dates: NA: May 31, 1999; PAL: July 30, 1999	Notes: Nintendo 64 version of Command & Conquer; Developed by Looking Glass Studios and published by Nintendo
System Shock 2 Original release dates: NA: July 31, 1999; PAL: 1999; AU: 1999	Release years by system: 1999 – Windows
System Shock 2 Original release dates: NA: July 31, 1999; PAL: 1999; AU: 1999	Notes: Sequel to System Shock; Developed by Looking Glass Studios and Irrational Games and published by Electronic Arts; Sega Dreamcast port was planned but cancelled
Flight Unlimited III Original release dates: NA: September 30, 1999; PAL: September 30, 1999	Release years by system: 1999 – Windows
Flight Unlimited III Original release dates: NA: September 30, 1999; PAL: September 30, 1999	Notes: A general aviation flight simulator and the third Flight Unlimited game; Developed by Looking Glass Studios and published by Electronic Arts
Destruction Derby 64 Original release dates: NA: September 30, 1999; PAL: October 12, 1999	Release years by system: 1999 – Nintendo 64
Destruction Derby 64 Original release dates: NA: September 30, 1999; PAL: October 12, 1999	Notes: A port of Destruction Derby to the Nintendo 64; Developed by Looking Glass Studios and published by THQ
Thief Gold Original release dates: NA: October 29, 1999; PAL: 1999	Release years by system: 1999 – Windows
Thief Gold Original release dates: NA: October 29, 1999; PAL: 1999	Notes: Expanded re-release of Thief: The Dark Project that features three additional missions; Developed by Looking Glass Studios and published by Eidos Interactive
Thief II: The Metal Age Original release dates: NA: March 23, 2000; PAL: March 31, 2000	Release years by system: 2000 – Windows
Thief II: The Metal Age Original release dates: NA: March 23, 2000; PAL: March 31, 2000	Notes: Stealth game sequel to Thief: The Dark Project; Developed by Looking Glass Studios and published by Eidos Interactive
Jane's Attack Squadron Original release dates: NA: March 22, 2002; PAL: April 5, 2002	Release years by system: 2002 – Windows
Jane's Attack Squadron Original release dates: NA: March 22, 2002; PAL: April 5, 2002	Notes: Combat flight simulator video game; Initially developed by Looking Glass Studios to be published by Electronic Arts, later finished by Mad Doc Software and released by Xicat Interactive

=== Cancelled ===
Game	Details
Voyager Cancellation date: Spring 1997	Proposed system release: 1997 – Windows
Voyager Cancellation date: Spring 1997	Notes: A tie-in to Star Trek: Voyager; Developed by Looking Glass Technologies and published by Viacom New Media; Developed for 18 months before cancellation
Junction Point Cancellation date: 1997	Proposed system release: 1998
Junction Point Cancellation date: 1997	Notes: Initially a massively multiplayer online role-playing game, later redesigned to be a single-player science fiction title; Developed by Looking Glass Technologies and published by Eidos Interactive; A Warren Spector project built with the Dark Engine
Deep Cover Cancellation date: 2000	Proposed system release: Unannounced
Deep Cover Cancellation date: 2000	Notes: Stealth game set in modern day; Developed by Looking Glass Studios and Irrational Games and published by Microsoft
Thief II Gold Cancellation date: 2000	Proposed system release: Unannounced
Thief II Gold Cancellation date: 2000	Notes: Re-release of Thief II: The Metal Age
Thief III Cancellation date: 2000	Proposed system release: Unannounced
Thief III Cancellation date: 2000	Notes: Sequel to Thief II: The Metal Age; Cancelled due to the closure of Looking Glass Studio; Eidos Interactive purchased the project and it was released in 2004 as Thief: Deadly Shadows
Mini Racers Cancellation date: 2000	Proposed system release: Nintendo 64
Mini Racers Cancellation date: 2000	Notes: Model car racing game for the Nintendo 64; Developed by Looking Glass Studios and published by Nintendo; Completed but then cancelled due to the closure of Looking Glass Studios
Wildwaters Cancellation date: 2000	Proposed system release: Nintendo 64
Wildwaters Cancellation date: 2000	Notes: Also known as "Extreme Kayak" and "X-Stream"; Kayak racing game for the Nintendo 64; Developed by Looking Glass Studios and published by Ubisoft
