= Voyager (video game) =

Cancelled video game

- Developer: Looking Glass Technologies
- Publisher: Viacom New Media
- Series: Star Trek: Voyager
- Platform: Windows 95
- Release: Cancelled
- Genre: Graphic adventure
- Mode: Single-player

Voyager was a graphic adventure computer game developed by Looking Glass Technologies from 1995 until its cancellation in 1997. It was published by Viacom New Media. Based on the Star Trek: Voyager license, the game followed Kathryn Janeway and the crew of the USS Voyager in their attempts to rescue members of their team from the Kazon. Voyager was the first game in a multi-title agreement between Viacom and Looking Glass, and Viacom took a minority equity investment in the company as part of the deal. However, Viacom decided to leave the video game industry in 1997, and Voyager was cancelled in spring of that year. In response to Voyager's cancellation, team members Ken Levine, Jonathan Chey and Rob Fermier left Looking Glass to found Irrational Games.

== Overview ==
Voyager was an adventure game based on the Star Trek: Voyager license. The player guided Kathryn Janeway and other characters aboard the USS Voyager through three "episodes". The game began as the USS Voyager resupplied at an agricultural planet, only to have certain members of its crew kidnapped by the Kazon. As Janeway and the surviving team tracked the Kazon, they encountered such things as other alien races and "an abandoned planet occupied only by a single computer system". Unlike in other Star Trek video games of the time, the player manipulated the crew at a high and general level. The player selected the crew's course of action from a list of options during "decision point" scenes, after which the crew would carry out their orders automatically. Certain decisions continued the plot, while others led to dead ends or to a game over. Producer Alan Dickens said, "We want to make it a lot like you're watching the TV and yelling at the characters. You're giving them, as a team, guidance and direction on where they should go and how they should address the various problems that come before them."

Between decision points, the player used and combined items, solved puzzles and engaged in combat. The game's item system involved scanning objects with tricorders and storing them in a "virtual inventory". This was an attempt to avoid hammerspace and the protagonists "stealing everything they find", two issues that Dickens said were common in the adventure game genre. "Tech sim" puzzles in the style of The Incredible Machine—a video game series in which players create Rube Goldberg machines—were a main feature in Voyager: the player would receive collections of mechanical parts, which would have to be combined into complex mechanisms. Combat took place on the ground and in space, and like other scenes was controlled at a general level. The player could order the crew to provide suppressive fire, to maneuver or to beam out, for example, and would then watch the scene play out.

== Development and aftermath ==
Looking Glass Technologies scanned the heads of Star Trek: Voyager's cast to create more accurate 3D models for the game.

Voyager began development in 1995, and it was announced in August of that year as the first game in a multi-title deal between Viacom New Media and Looking Glass Technologies. According to Next Generation, the announcement was "greeted with joy" by gamers and fans of Star Trek. Viacom was interested in Looking Glass's engine technology, and took a minority equity investment in the company. Voyager was conceptualized by Dickens and by Viacom producer Rachel Leventhal. It was initially planned for release in 1996, but a later report gave it an expected release date of early 1997. The team at Looking Glass visited and researched the set of Star Trek: Voyager in order to reproduce it accurately, and they created 3D laser scans of the cast's heads. Voice over from the cast was also recorded. The game's characters and pre-rendered backgrounds were created with 3D Studio and Alias, and the characters were animated with the skeletal animation system that had been developed for Terra Nova: Strike Force Centauri. Designer Jonathan Chey worked on the game's physics and artificial intelligence code, which he later said were "really weird" features for an adventure game and evidence of unfocused development. During the game's showing at the 1996 Electronic Entertainment Expo (E3) in June, a writer for Computer Games Strategy Plus called it "one of the most highly anticipated projects currently floating around the game world."

Voyager was cancelled in the spring of 1997, after 18 months in production. According to Looking Glass's Paul Neurath, the cancellation was due to Viacom's wider decision to abandon the video game industry. He believed that the Viacom deal and Voyager were ultimately a "giant distraction" and a "boondoggle" that hurt the company. These events started a financial downward spiral at Looking Glass, which, compounded by a string of troubled and commercially unsuccessful projects such as Terra Nova and British Open Championship Golf, culminated in the company's closure in May 2000. Three members of the Voyager team—Chey, writer Ken Levine and designer Rob Fermier—became close friends during the game's development. The game's cancellation inspired them to start the spin-off developer Irrational Games in April 1997, which went on to develop System Shock 2 in collaboration with Looking Glass. Levine later recalled that, while writing Voyager's opening cutscene, he learned that technological limitations made it difficult for characters to express emotion; and this experience influenced his future writing for games such as BioShock Infinite.
