= Jane's Attack Squadron =

2002 video game

- Developers: Looking Glass Studios; Mad Doc Software
- Publisher: Xicat Interactive
- Series: Jane's Combat Simulations
- Platform: Microsoft Windows
- Release: NA: March 2002
- Genre: Air combat simulation
- Modes: Single player, Multiplayer

Jane's Attack Squadron is a 2002 combat flight simulator developed by Looking Glass Studios and Mad Doc Software and published by Xicat Interactive. Based on World War II, the game allows players to pilot fifteen reproductions of that era's military aircraft and to carry out missions for the Axis or Allies. Although it contains dogfights, the game focuses largely on air-to-ground combat, hence the title.

Jane's Attack Squadron was first conceived by Looking Glass employee Seamus Blackley as Flight Combat, a combat-based sequel to Flight Unlimited. The company continued designing the game after Blackley was fired in 1995, and it entered production under Electronic Arts in 1998. The team experienced problems with deadlines and funding during development, with the game eventually being heavily redesigned and renamed Jane's Attack Squadron at the request of the publisher. These issues contributed to Looking Glass's bankruptcy and closure in 2000. In 2001 and 2002, the game was acquired and finished by Mad Doc Software, a company in part composed of former Looking Glass employees.

The game received mixed to poor reviews. Critics found its physics modeling unrealistic, and many believed that the game's graphics and gameplay were outdated, particularly in light of contemporary simulators like IL-2 Sturmovik. The limited number of missions and large number of glitches were widely panned. Certain critics enjoyed Jane's Attack Squadron's air-to-ground combat and several hoped that fans would improve the game with the included physics and mission editors.

== Gameplay ==
The player flies with friendly planes.

As a combat flight simulator, Jane's Attack Squadron allows players to pilot military aircraft in a three-dimensional (3D) graphical environment. The game is set in Western Europe during World War II; and players may control fifteen German and Allied planes from the era, including the Focke-Wulf Fw 190, Supermarine Spitfire, Junkers Ju 88, Avro Lancaster and Consolidated B-24 Liberator. Although dogfights are possible, the game places a heavy focus on air-to-ground combat. Objectives range from bombing and torpedo runs to defense and escort missions. The player may engage in tutorials, "quick missions", "single missions" and a campaign. Quick missions allow the player to select variables such as the objective and the number of friendly and enemy aircraft, while single missions, of which there are five, are scripted, "pre-made" levels. Two campaigns are available: one each for the Allies and Germans. Both campaigns feature ten missions that branch depending on the outcome achieved by the player. An online multiplayer component allows players to engage in dogfights.

Each plane in Jane's Attack Squadron is composed of forty-five parts that may be removed or otherwise damaged in combat. Damage to these parts affects performance; for example, a broken fuel line will leak, quickly decreasing the fuel gauge. Various adjustments may be made to the game's realism, including an "arcade physics" option that drastically reduces flight difficulty. The game is packaged with the mission and physics editors that were used to develop it.

== Development ==
=== At Looking Glass ===
In September 1994, Looking Glass Technologies employee Seamus Blackley told Computer Gaming World that he wanted to create a combat-based sequel to Flight Unlimited, whose development he was directing at the time. The magazine's Johnny L. Wilson wrote: "If Flight Unlimited can pass the civilian tests, the military version should be right behind it". In March of the next year, Blackley told PC Gamer US that the sequel "should feel so real that pilots will be afraid. They'll feel the gun hits". He dismissed the flight dynamics in other flight simulators, such as Falcon 3.0, in favor of the real-time computational fluid dynamics (CFDs) model he created for Flight Unlimited. When PC Gamer's Bernie Yee asked why the team had waited to make a combat flight simulator, Blackley responded that they wanted to "retrain" players first. In September, Computer Gaming World reported that Blackley was designing a combat-based sequel to Flight Unlimited under the working title Flight Combat. Blackley told them that it would "make you into a fighter pilot", and the magazine commented that it would teach the same material as the Air Force. The team planned to allow players to practice an element and then execute it on a mission, and Blackley said that the game would feature competitive online play. However, a new manager at Looking Glass Technologies, instated by venture capital investors, demanded that Blackley work on Flight Unlimited II instead of Flight Combat. Blackley refused and was fired, leaving the company in late 1995.

In March 1996, PC Gamer US reported that Flight Combat was "still taxiing across the design board", and that the team planned to focus "on how the aerial manoeuvres are performed as you fight". Looking Glass designer Constantine Hantzopoulos told the magazine that a modified version of the Flight Unlimited engine was being used to develop Flight Combat and Flight Unlimited II. Hantzopoulos commented that Flight Combat was "the project everybody at Looking Glass wants to work on". The team expected to be finished with the game in roughly one year. By June 1997, GameSpot reported that Flight Unlimited II was running on the new ZOAR engine, coded from scratch by programmer James Fleming. In addition, the real-time CFDs model from Flight Unlimited had been discarded, as its programming was "all black box spaghetti code from Seamus". GameSpot's T. Liam MacDonald noted that the Flight Unlimited II team expected soon to use the same engine for a combat flight simulator set in World War II. Computer Gaming World similarly reported that the company was "definitely hot" to develop Flight Combat, and that it might be created after Flight Unlimited II. Following that game's completion, the team could not decide between developing Flight Unlimited III or Flight Combat. As a result, they decided to develop them simultaneously, and Flight Combat began production in early 1998. Unlike all of the studio's other games, development of Flight Combat was funded through an insured bond, in an attempt to guarantee that the game would be finished. The company's Tim Stellmach later said that this setup was "a real pain for [the team] in some ways".

Looking Glass signed a multi-game publishing deal with Electronic Arts in May 1998, and that company became the publisher of Flight Combat. The team "undersold" the game to Electronic Arts, and James Sterrett of the fansite Through the Looking Glass believed that the team "gambled that it could get the game out the door faster than the budget actually called for". In March 1999, the game was announced as the World War II-themed Flight Combat: Thunder Over Europe, directed by Hantzopoulos and scheduled for release in fall of that year. That May, the game was shown at the Electronic Arts booth at E3. Computer Games Magazine's Steve Udell wrote that the game would feature a new iteration of the Flight Unlimited terrain renderer, and IGN reported that one million square miles of terrain based on European landscapes would be available. Weather conditions such as snow and rain were planned. Udell wrote that Flight Combat's flight physics were an updated version of those from recent Flight Unlimited games, with new material taken from operations manuals and flight tests. Plane models and textures were based on photographs, and many of the moving parts and flight control surfaces were modeled individually. Players were given the option to customize planes. Udell described a physics-based damage system that, according to the company, made it impossible to "see the exact same kind of damage twice". Two campaigns—the Battle of Britain and the Defence of the Reich—were announced, with missions based on dogfights, air-to-ground combat and bombing runs. Looking Glass claimed that the game features "moving tanks and ships duk[ing] it out on a dynamic battlefield" as the player carried out missions. Aesthetically, IGN's Tal Blevins noted that the game had "a very distinct 40s charm", which was present "from the briefings to the options screens".

=== Bankruptcy and cancellation ===
Electronic Arts rebranded Flight Combat as Jane's Attack Squadron, to fit with the Jane's Information Group license that the publisher had used for its Jane's Combat Simulations line. According to Stellmach, the publisher demanded that the game be heavily redesigned "partway through" development, which exacerbated the team's existing problems with meeting deadlines. Sterrett believed that the game's schedule and funding did not receive the necessary adjustments to allow for this redesign. Together with Flight Unlimited III's commercial failure, the expenses of Jane's Attack Squadron's long development used up revenue from Thief: The Dark Project, which had helped the company recover from the failure of Terra Nova: Strike Force Centauri and British Open Championship Golf. Compounding these problems, business deals with Microsoft, Irrational Games and Eidos Interactive were unsuccessful. As a result, Looking Glass Studios went bankrupt in May 2000. At the time, Jane's Attack Squadron was roughly three months from completion. Thief II Gold and Thief III were canceled as a result of the company's closure, but Jane's Attack Squadron, because it was near completion and funded through an insured bond, had a chance of being finished.

According to Gordon Berg of Computer Gaming World, the legal and logistical problems of keeping "a portion of Looking Glass [...] intact" to finish the game had been "hurdled". Further, because of the game's type of funding, the continued development of Jane's Attack Squadron would have been at little cost to Electronic Arts. Fans petitioned the publisher to let development continue, and Looking Glass employee Rich Carlson said that Hantzopoulos and others from the Flight series, roughly twenty in all, were prepared to work on the game again. The petition reached 2,000 signatures by May 30 and 5,000 by June 1, but Electronic Arts dropped the game. The publisher's Jeff Brown said that the decision "was based on our deep uncertainty that the project could meet any schedule given the changes in senior management and a history of missing deadlines". Brown told the website Combatsim that Electronic Arts had "worked diligently" with Looking Glass for more than two years, and that, although the game had missed its planned October 1999 release, they had been willing to delay the project into 2000. He blamed the developer's closure for the decision to cancel the game. Rumors circulated that the decision was part of the publisher's larger plan to abandon the flight simulator genre, and Computer Gaming World's Denny Atkin later summarized that the company "ran screaming from the simulation market" after Looking Glass's bankruptcy. Electronic Arts soon dropped the Jane's Information Group license.

=== At Mad Doc Software ===
After the closure of Looking Glass, certain employees of that company moved to developer Mad Doc Software, and they hoped to complete Jane's Attack Squadron. The game's original lead designer and lead programmer were among those hired by Mad Doc Software. Dotted Line Entertainment, Mad Doc Software's agent company, secured the rights to the game's code for the team in 2001. Development commenced shortly afterward. In August of that year, it was reported that the Jane's Information Group license had been obtained by Xicat Interactive, and that the company planned to publish Mad Doc Software's revival of Jane's Attack Squadron. The full details of the agreement were announced at that year's European Computer Trade Show, where it was revealed that Jane's Attack Squadron would focus heavily on air-to-ground combat. According to Mad Doc Software's Tim Farrar: "Our goal wasn't to create a completely new game, it was to complete the game that was started at LG". Farrar noted that, although the company "trimmed some of the more ambitious features", Jane's Attack Squadron was effectively "the same game" created by Looking Glass. As with Flight Combat, the game features one million square miles of terrain, planes with individually modeled moving parts and a physics-based damage system.

In October 2001, the game was officially announced in a press release by Mad Doc Software. Steve Nadeau, the lead designer of the game at both development studios, said that he looked forward to polishing Jane's Attack Squadron and "giv[ing] it a new life". He believed that the team was "very excited" to finish the game, a sentiment later echoed by the game's producer, David Halpern. According to Nadeau, the presence of members of the Looking Glass team ensured that it would "closely reflect our original vision of the game: an action-packed World War II air combat simulation accessible to users of all skill levels". Farrar announced that the team's mission and physics editors would be released alongside the game, which he hoped would generate interest among players. Farrar later commented that, because of the game's physics-based damage system and individually modeled components, wings could be shot off and fuel tanks detonated. He also explained that coolant tanks could be hit, giving the pilot a limited amount of time before the plane engine overheated. He wrote that losing a wing tip meant "a bumpy ride", but the loss of the tail caused the plane to "spin into the ground". Jane's Attack Squadron went gold in March 2002, and was released that month.

== Reception ==
Reception

Review scores
Publication	Score
Computer Gaming World	3/5
GameSpy	68/100
IGN	4.5/10
PC Gamer (US)	71%
The Adrenaline Vault	2.5/5

Denny Atkin of Computer Gaming World wrote that Jane's Attack Squadron "had the potential to be sim of the year in 2000", but that it had been rendered largely irrelevant by delays and "unrealized design goals". He believed that its graphics would have been "state of the art in 2000", but he found them middling in 2002 and he noted the presence of numerous glitches. He considered the game's most serious flaw to be its low number of missions. Although Atkin found the air-to-air combat "generally fun", citing "good pilot AI" and "decent" flight physics, he believed that the game's bombing runs were its most outstanding element. He hoped that fans would use the mission and physics editors to improve the game, and he concluded: "It's buggy, but when it works it's worth flying". Andy Mahood of PC Gamer US wrote that Jane's Attack Squadron is "unquestionably an entertaining and unique WWII prop sim", but he believed that it was clearly inferior to games such as IL-2 Sturmovik. He found the game's graphics to be outdated and its design to be "simplistic", and he wrote that its "somewhat basic flight model" prevents advanced maneuvers. He praised the game's sound effects and music, as well as its "intricate damage modeling", as its best features. He finished by saying that, because the genre was "starving for fresh titles", Jane's Attack Squadron could be recommended despite its flaws.

IGN's Tom Chick found it "unrealistic, erratic, and limited", writing that it "looks bad, plays poorly, and is unstable". He disliked its "canned and rigidly scripted missions", although he found its bombing runs "interesting" and its air-to-air combat features acceptable. However, he believed that ease of shooting down aircraft made the damage system's "powerful amount of flexibility" worthless. Chick believed that the multiplayer component was one of the game's worst features, and he derided the game's "suspiciously canned physics", which offered "a grab bag of fidelity mixed in with heaps of silliness". He summarized Jane's Attack Squadron as "awful". Josh Horowitz of The Adrenaline Vault noted the complex damage system, and he believed that the game "looks as good as most of today's flight simulators", although he experienced performance issues. He noted that the gameplay was hurt by "corner cutting or general incompletion", such as the limited in-game tutorials. Horowitz found the game "repetitive" because of its lack of missions and "low sense of involvement", and, like Chick, he disliked its multiplayer and "linear" missions. Although he offered significant praise for its sound, Horowitz concluded that the game was "a buggy, incomplete offering", and that those "looking for the next great Jane's title will likely be disappointed".

GameSpy's Bernard Dy wrote that the game failed to live up to the Jane's Combat Simulations pedigree, and he believed that those who enjoyed "the realism of Il-2 Sturmovik will be disappointed". He disliked its "relaxed flight models" and lack of features, and he cited a large number of glitches. In turn, Dy found its damage system "robust" and he believed that the game was "not a total loss". Like Atkin, he hoped that fans would improve the game with its detailed editors, although he believed that this was somewhat unlikely.
