= Flight Unlimited =

1995 flight simulation video game

- North American box art
- Developer: LookingGlass Technologies
- Publisher: LookingGlass Technologies
- Designer: Seamus Blackley
- Platforms: MS-DOS, Windows 95, Mac
- Release: June 7, 1995
- Genre: Flight simulation
- Mode: Single-player

Flight Unlimited is a 1995 aerobatic flight simulation video game developed and published by LookingGlass Technologies. It allows players to pilot reproductions of real-world aircraft and to perform aerobatic maneuvers. They may fly freely, race through floating rings against a timer or take lessons from a virtual flight instructor. The instructor teaches basic and advanced techniques, ranging from rudder turns to maneuvers such as the tailslide, Lomcovák and Immelmann turn.

Flight Unlimited was the first self-published game released by Looking Glass Technologies. It was intended to establish the company as a video game publisher and to compete with flight simulator franchises such as Microsoft Flight Simulator. Project leader Seamus Blackley, a particle physicist and amateur pilot, conceived the game in 1992. He felt that other flight simulators failed to convey the experience of real flight, and he reacted by coding a simulated atmosphere for Flight Unlimited based on real-time computational fluid dynamics. Aerobatic pilot Michael Goulian endorsed the game and assisted the team in making it more true to life.

Flight Unlimited received positive reviews from critics and was a commercial success; its sales exceeded 780,000 copies by 2002. Reviewers lauded its realism, flight instruction, graphics and sense of flight, but some criticized its high system requirements. The game was followed by two sequels: Flight Unlimited II (1997) and Flight Unlimited III (1999). A combat-oriented successor, Flight Combat, was released in 2002 as Jane's Attack Squadron after a series of setbacks. Soon after Flight Unlimited's completion, Blackley was fired from Looking Glass. He went on to design Jurassic Park: Trespasser at DreamWorks Interactive and later spearhead the Xbox project at Microsoft.

== Gameplay ==
Piloting the Extra 300S in the 3-D Cockpit view mode, the player follows a "ghost plane" through a Hoops course above Sugarloaf, Maine. The flight instruments, which show real-time information about the plane, are displayed on the bottom half of the screen.

Flight Unlimited is a three-dimensional (3D) flight simulator video game: its gameplay is a simulation of piloting real-world airplanes. Players may control the Bellanca Decathlon, Extra 300S, Pitts Special S-2B, Sukhoi Su-31 and Grob G103a Twin II sailplane. The game begins at the fixed-base operator (FBO) interface—a traversable 3D room whose contents represent menu options. For example, the player interacts with a row of scale airplane models to select an aircraft, and with a world globe to change airfield locations. Six settings are available, including Sedona, Arizona and Springfield, Vermont.

The player may choose to begin flight on a runway or taxiway, or in the air. Aircraft are controlled via keyboard, joystick, head-mounted display or specialized input devices such as pedals. During flight, several third- and first-person camera angles may be selected. For example, the third-person Flyby View places the camera in front of the plane as it flies past, while the first-person Three-Way View displays more information about the plane's position and speed than other angles. Certain camera angles, including the Three-Way View and 3-D Cockpit view, provide the player with simulated flight instruments such as an altimeter, airspeed indicator, accelerometer, variometer and tachometer. The game is designed to allow players to perform aerobatic maneuvers such as the Immelmann turn, tailslide, Lomcevak and Cuban Eight. Performances may be recorded and played back, with controls that allow the player to pause, rewind and fast forward. At any time, the player may stop a recording and resume flight from that point.

The game contains lessons that cover basic and advanced flight techniques, ranging from rudder turns to challenging aerobatic maneuvers. A simulated flight instructor offers real-time advice based on the player's performance. Certificates are earned by performing well during lessons. In Hoops courses, the player undertakes a time trial through rings that float in the sky, with the option to enable a "ghost plane" of the highest score. Four types of Hoops courses are available: Basic, Challenge, Distance and Trick. The last is intended as a highly demanding test of the player's aerobatic ability. The game's sole non-powered aircraft, the Grob G103a Twin II sailplane, features its own game mode focused on energy management. The player attempts to use the direction of the wind, thermals—which realistically occur above areas that absorb more heat, such as plains and parking lots—and the orographic lift caused by slopes to stay airborne for as long as possible.

== Development ==
=== Origin ===
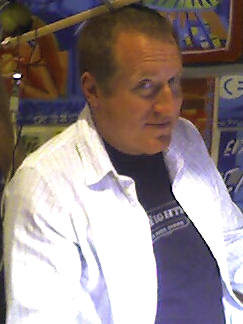
Seamus Blackley was instrumental in the development of Flight Unlimited.

The concept of Flight Unlimited originated from Looking Glass Technologies' discontent with contemporary flight simulators. Company co-founders Paul Neurath and Ned Lerner wanted to develop an exceptional game in the genre, and Neurath considered the idea during the production of Ultima Underworld: The Stygian Abyss and Ultima Underworld II: Labyrinth of Worlds. In 1992, Seamus Blackley, who had been undertaking graduate studies in particle physics at the Fermilab research facility, was hired through a want advertisement that Lerner had placed on a bulletin board. At the company, Blackley programmed the physics modeling system for a racing game and designed a large number of standalone physics demonstrations. He became fascinated by physics programming. An amateur pilot and flight devotee, Blackley asked Lerner extensive questions about his earlier game Chuck Yeager's Advanced Flight Trainer, which Blackley held in high regard. In reaction to Blackley's enthusiasm, Neurath suggested that the company develop a "traditional Cessna sim".

However, Blackley instead proposed an aerobatics training simulation, which he had conceived while reading an aerobatics magazine on a Lexington, Massachusetts bus. Collaborating with Ultima Underworld II programmer Greg Travis, he created a thirty page concept document that outlined the game. His core idea was to recreate the "yummy, visceral, fluid feeling that you get when flying a real airplane". He wanted the project to bear more resemblance to a playground than to a video game, and he sought to give it simple controls and realistic terrain to decrease the learning curve for beginners. Blackley assumed the role of project leader and then engaged the team in "flaming sessions" to generate ideas. According to programmer Doug Church, Blackley's concept of the game was not fully developed, but he clearly expressed his thoughts and motivated the team. The first months of the project produced disparate prototypes that demonstrated prospective features. The company committed to full development of the game in early 1993, and production commenced in March.

=== Production ===
Blackley's first objective was to code the game's simulated physics. He began by deciding on a programming method—in particular, he sought one that would allow aircraft to perform the "knife-edge spin" maneuver that he had witnessed at air shows. In 1995, he said that he had never played a flight simulator with an accurate sense of flight. He later described his belief that the genre had stagnated, and that flight games were evaluated "by [their] implementation of the standard feature set", rather than by their enjoyability. Blackley researched physics programming in contemporary flight simulators, and he discovered that many used large databases of wind tunnel and plane sensory equipment information to dictate how aircraft would operate in prerecorded scenarios. Higher-end simulators used a "Newtonian" system, in which algebra-based measurements of force vectors determine a plane's position in real-time. However, Blackley believed that neither system correctly simulated the experience of flight.

In reaction, he used his knowledge of particle physics to create a real-time computational fluid dynamics (CFDs) model for Flight Unlimited. The result is a simulated atmosphere: air acts as a fluid that automatically reacts to the shape of any object placed within it. Blackley gave the example that a lawn chair, if placed within the game's real-time CFDs model, would fall merely because of its shape. The game's planes fly because the interaction of their architecture with the atmosphere creates lift, as with real-world aircraft. Changes in the plane's direction are caused by the interaction of their flight control surfaces (ailerons, elevators and rudders) with the simulated atmosphere. Because it simulates the dynamics of flight in real-time, the system allows for aerobatic maneuvers that were impossible in previous flight simulators. In 1994, Blackley said that it was possibly the first flight code designed for aerobatics. In constructing the CFDs model, Blackley and the team built from the Navier–Stokes equations of fluid motion, which Blackley described as "horrible, complicated partial differential equations". According to Computer Gaming World, Blackley did not seek to represent the equations with perfect accuracy, and he was satisfied when the results were consistent and the sensation that they generated was correct.

After programming a basic version of the CFDs model, Blackley used several programs to examine the simulated currents of air that flowed across a model of a flat plate. He adjusted the code until the plate fell realistically, and then constructed test models for a plane wing and fuselage. He eventually built a complete but dysfunctional plane by using data from "pinhead books". By reading aircraft design manuals, he discovered that the problems were caused by his plane's incorrect tail and center of gravity. Following this, he created an exact three-dimensional model of the Extra 300S over roughly three days. As he had not yet simulated the physical attributes of its propeller, Blackley programmed the plane to be propelled from the rear. However, the accurate model performed properly in the simulated atmosphere.

Artists Mike Marsicano and Kurt Bickenbach played critical roles in the creation of the game's aircraft models, which were built in 3D Studio. As reference material, the team photographed real planes at several airfields, and they received blueprints and datasheets from aircraft manufacturers. The game's Grob G103a Twin II sailplane was based directly on the one that Blackley owned at the time. The sophistication of the real-time CFDs complicated the 3D modeling process, as the planes required accurate geometry to fly properly. While attempting to meet this goal, however, Bickenbach said that the models he created were overly detailed, which caused the team to struggle with performance issues related to the high number of polygons. Reducing the number altered the plane's shape, which in turn reduced its flight realism; this necessitated a balance between performance and accuracy. To obtain audio for the planes, Greg LoPiccolo and Tom Streit—former bassist and road manager, respectively, of the band Tribe—visited a Florida importer of Russian aerobatic aircraft. The two placed microphones inside the cockpits and next to the engines, and they flew each plane at multiple speeds while recording with a digital audio tape machine. Combining this material with digital recordings of wind sounds, the team fashioned a physics-based sound system: sounds of the wind and engine are altered in real-time based on wind speed in the game.

The flight instructor was designed to respond to the player's performance. If a mistake is made during a maneuver—such as the Immelmann turn demonstrated above—guidance is provided in real-time.

The flight instructor was created by programmer Andrew Grant and voiced by Tom Streit. It monitors the player's controller input during "each frame of animation". If a maneuver is attempted, the instructor "interpolates the initial control movements" and predicts which maneuver is being performed. The instructor then gives advice on how to complete the maneuver and offers guidance if a mistake is made. Grant believed that the code is sometimes "too picky", and he stated that it expects players to perform maneuvers more precisely than is humanly possible. The team initially planned to include an online multiplayer component, which would have allowed 64 planes to fly in the same area—thereby giving players the ability to compete with one another. However, the feature was not implemented into the final game. The staff members also sought to include aerobatic competitions in which the player could participate, but the idea was dropped because of difficulties with realism. Problems with artificially intelligent judges were also a factor in the feature's removal.

Flight Unlimited's terrain graphics were created with stereophotogrammetry. The team gathered aerial photographs from locations in France and the United States. They combined two to three images of each area to create digital reproductions roughly 11 square miles (28 km^{2}) in size. Each location in the game was based on two stereoscopic sets of photographs, which were processed for more than 72 hours by a "dedicated Pentium tucked away in a dark corner". From the contrasting images, the computer generated a terrain "data blanket" with 3D height variations. While the team had considered using satellite or surveillance aircraft images to create the game's terrain graphics, they found that the resolution was inadequate. Material from geographic information systems was also studied, but associate producer Paul Schaffer said that it would have been "astronomically expensive" to obtain data with the necessary resolution.

After assembling a playable demo of Flight Unlimited, the team requested assistance from then-US Aerobatic Team member Michael Goulian, who worked as a flight instructor at the nearby Hanscom Field. Because of the game's flight code, Goulian was able to execute aerobatic maneuvers within less than three minutes of playing the game; and he later performed his "entire basic aerobatic routine". Blackley told PC Gamer US that, while Goulian disliked flight simulators, "When he flew Flight Unlimited, he just said 'pretty cool.' I was so psyched". Goulian assisted the team during the next year of development: he co-designed the game's flight lessons and advised the team on adjustments to the plane models. Aerobatic pilot Patty Wagstaff was also consulted. At one point, the team encountered problems while testing a maneuver in the game's Sukhoi Su-31, and Blackley was concerned that he would need to rework the game's physics code. However, Goulian phoned a colleague—a Russian pilot—who told them to compensate for the plane's abnormally large ailerons. Using his advice on flying the real-world plane, the team found that the maneuver worked correctly. Goulian endorsed Flight Unlimited and wrote the foreword to its official strategy guide.

The graphics and physics code increased the game's system requirements, and the team worked to optimize performance during development. They struggled to improve the game's memory usage: the process consumed nearly as much time as the creation of the physics model, according to Church. Programmer Eric Twietmeyer ran weekly tests of the game's performance by disabling certain parts of the code—such as the physics calculations—to isolate which parts used the most memory. By 1994, Blackley's physics code took up only 1% of CPU time, with the rest allocated to the terrain renderer. Blackley optimized his code by converting the mathematical calculations of air from the 3D game world into a "math-friendly space", during which time the Navier-Stokes equations are applied. Afterwards, the data is returned to 3D space. According to Computer Gaming World, this method increased speed by "a factor of 100, with almost no loss in precision." The team had trouble with complex memory-related glitches during development. Church called them "crazy", and programmer Greg Travis noted that debugging the terrain cache system was a "nightmare".

While leading the team, Blackley adopted a loose style of supervision. According to Opening the Xbox author Dean Takahashi, "Blackley [was not] ultra-organized. His idea of good management was to invite someone over for a gourmet dinner and have a casual conversation about work". However, Takahashi wrote that "Blackley worked hard to inspire his team", and he described artist James Dollar's belief that, "in contrast to other Looking Glass managers, he didn't take over tasks and make others feel stupid". During the first two years of production, the team was divided into small groups that worked on the game's elements separately. For example, Blackley programmed the game's physics, while Eric Twietmeyer and Tim Day created the terrain renderer. However, Doug Church later said that, while "the team [did] a bunch of very cool stuff, the FBO, the flight model, the instructor, the renderer, so on", the result "was almost like four separate programs, with no connection". Following the completion of the concurrently-developed System Shock, a significant part of that game's team—including Church, Marc LeBlanc and Rob Fermier—moved to Flight Unlimited to add connective material. At the time, Church said that it was difficult to meld the game's elements, but he later stated that they largely coalesced by the end.

=== Publication ===
Flight Unlimited was self-published by Looking Glass Technologies. Their previous games had been developed for other video game publishers, and had generated $90 million total earnings for those companies. However, Ronald Rosenberg of The Boston Globe reported that Looking Glass was "no longer satisfied as a backroom player surviving on royalties". Doug Church later explained that the company wanted to self-publish in order to escape the "treadmill of waiting for advances", which would allow them to make long-term plans without needing to satisfy the immediate demands of a publisher. In late 1994, Looking Glass announced that venture capital investors, including Matrix Partners and Institutional Venture Partners, had provided the company with $3.8 million. The sum was intended to fund the development and self-publication of Flight Unlimited. According to Michael Humphreys of Matrix Partners and Ruthann Quindlen of Institutional Venture Partners, the decision was partly influenced by the past success of the company's co-founders, Paul Neurath and Ned Lerner.

Looking Glass intended Flight Unlimited as a gateway into the video game publishing industry. According to Lerner, the idea of self-publishing had been considered when the company was founded. In 1995, Looking Glass projected that sales of Flight Unlimited would increase royalty revenues to $10 million that year, up from $1.5 million in 1994. Jeffrey A. Kalowski, the company's vice president of finance and administration, expected that the game would recoup its development costs and make a return before the end of the year. He predicted that, over the following 12 to 18 months, the company's number of employees would increase from 52 to 82. The company's executive vice president and general manager, Jerry Wolosenko, told The Boston Globe that the company hoped to publish six games each year. According to Doug Church, the pressure for Flight Unlimited to succeed meant that the concurrently-developed System Shock, which was not self-published, received little attention from the company's management.

Flight Unlimited was placed in direct competition with several major flight simulator franchises. Before the game's release, Shelby Bateman of Next Generation Magazine wrote, "1995 is going to be a real dogfight in the flight-sim and aerial-combat categories, and LookingGlass [sic] is betting its bankroll ... that it can capture significant market share from the likes of Microsoft Flight Simulator and the debut of Spectrum HoloByte's Falcon 4.0, among others." Describing the situation, Johnny L. Wilson of Computer Gaming World wrote, "The games that sell big are the ones that allow you to blow stuff up, so, if anything, that could be a problem for Flight Unlimited." Doug Church explained that, because the game did not feature combat and bore little resemblance to Microsoft Flight Simulator, the team spent "many late nights" on marketing strategies. However, he noted that the game had a wide appeal among those who tested it during development, which he called "a really good sign". Talking to Bernie Yee of PC Gamer US, Paul Neurath said that he thought the game would sell well. Yee noted that Neurath "fully [expected] it to prove more popular than Microsoft Flight Simulator".

In January 1995, Looking Glass showed Flight Unlimited alongside Terra Nova: Strike Force Centauri at the Winter Consumer Electronics Show, under their "Immersive Reality" marketing label. In March 1995, the Boston Globe reported that the team was performing "11th hour checks" of the game to prepare it for shipment to a midwestern United States Compact Disc manufacturer. According to the newspaper, Looking Glass planned to begin by shipping 100,000 units to retailers in Canada and the United States. Another 100,000 copies were to be sent to France, Germany and the United Kingdom at a later date. However, upon the game's June 7, 1995 release for MS-DOS, 200,000 units were distributed simultaneously in the United States and Europe. The game's European releases were localized with German, French and English text and voice acting, which was made possible by "close coordination with international partners". Versions for Macintosh and Windows 95 were later released; the former was shown at the Macworld Expo in April 1996.

== Reception ==
Flight Unlimited was a commercial success. It debuted in twelfth place on a June 1995 sales chart compiled by NPD Group, while Microsoft Flight Simulator 5.1 took first place. The game went on to sell more than 300,000 copies by 1997, and more than 780,000 by 2002. According to Constantine von Hoffman of the Boston Herald, Flight Unlimited successfully competed with Microsoft Flight Simulator. PC Gamer's Lee Buchanan wrote that it "soars above the pack of flight simulations", and he considered it to be "the most fun [he had] had in a computerized cockpit". Frank Vizard of Popular Mechanics hailed it as "the new top gun of flight simulators", and Doug Bailey of The Boston Globe considered it to be the "first real serious challenge to Microsoft's dominance of the genre". The Record's David Noack believed that the game's physics and stereoscopic terrain set "a new standard in flight simulation". Writing for Computer Gaming World, Bob and John Nolan stated, "If anything, you should at least take a look at this product, because you'll be looking at the future of simulations."

The game was a finalist in the 12th Annual Awards for Technical Excellence held by PC Magazine, whose staff called it "the simulator by which all others will be judged." It was named the best simulation of 1995 by Computer Games Strategy Plus (tied with Apache), and the best of 1996 by Macworld, whose editor Steven Levy wrote that it "puts you in touch with what makes flying special." Inside Mac Games and PC Gamer both nominated Flight Unlimited as the simulation of the year, although it lost these awards to A-10 Cuba! and Apache, respectively.

=== Design ===
Vizard stated that Flight Unlimited's "very advanced computational fluid dynamics make [each] plane react according to spec". Buchanan lauded the fluid model for creating a "sensation of actual flight [that] is nothing short of magnificent", while PC Magazine's staff commented that it makes "planes behave more like real aircraft than any simulator we have seen". Bob and John Nolan called the game's physics programming "groundbreaking", and Chris Ware of the Lexington Herald-Leader found the game to be the most accurate simulation of flight beyond "those multimillion-dollar flight simulators [used by] fighter pilots and astronauts". Noack agreed: he wrote that the game "is about as close to flying within going to the airport". In 1996, Computer Gaming World presented Flight Unlimited with a Special Artistic Achievement Award For Physical Model. The magazine's staff praised Blackley's programming for pushing the genre "higher into the realm of simulation", and listed the game's sophisticated physics model as #5 on its list of "the 15 best ways to die in computer gaming".

Ware found Flight Unlimited approachable and noted its "simplicity of use and depth of instruction". Buchanan hailed the lesson mode as "a dream come true for any budding pilot". A writer for The Washington Post called the game "[the] world's first truly easy-to-use flight simulator" and "a good entry product", in which "rank amateurs can just launch the program and start cruising immediately". The Washington Post's John Gaudiosi wrote that, while many games in the genre are overly complex, Flight Unlimited lets "those who aren't rocket scientists ... experience the thrills of stunt flying." He found its control scheme simple to understand. By contrast, Bailey found the game difficult and initially "frustrating": he complained that he had to play the lesson mode before even taking off. Denny Atkin of Computer Gaming World characterized the game's learning curve as steep, thanks to the accuracy of the physics programming, but he noted the scalable difficulty options. Bailey later recommended the game in a holiday shopping guide. He wrote that "it can be difficult to master. But once you're up, it's worth the trouble."

A writer for The Washington Post commented that "serious flight freaks will like the racing and advanced maneuvers". According to Gaudiosi, dedicated players will learn "all about aerodynamics and stunt flying"; he considered the latter to be "hard stuff, even with green hoops guiding you". Similarly, Buchanan characterized the Hoops courses as "incredibly demanding", and Atkin cited that mode's Trick difficulty level as "amazingly tough". Bob and John Nolan wrote that people who "love to loop around the skies of Flight Simulator 5 will go bananas for" the aerobatics; but the pair commented that combat flight simulator players "might get a little edgy once the wow-power wears off." However, Atkin believed that only those "never happy without something to shoot at" could be disappointed by the lack of combat: other players will "be too busy choreographing aerial ballets, pulling off death-defying aerobatic stunts, or just enjoying a quiet soar down the ridge line to miss that stuff". Likewise, Ware called the non-violent gameplay "refreshing", and Buchanan wrote, "If [you are] a battle-weary veteran of air combat sims, Flight Unlimited might be just the sort of [rest and relaxation] you need."

=== Presentation ===
Atkin found the cockpit and terrain graphics to look "almost real". He commented, "Every few years a sim comes along that lets reviewers use the 'sets new standards for graphics' cliché, and Flight Unlimited is the 1995 entry in this club." Bob and John Nolan called Flight Unlimited "the ultimate show off piece for your new Pentium", thanks to "unbelievable" graphics superior to those of any other computer game. Gaudiosi concurred: he characterized the visuals as "photo-sharp" and "better than any I have seen". PC Magazine's staff found the graphics "impressive" and "even more stunning than those in Microsoft Flight Simulator". Ware noted the "stunning 3-D photo-realistic scenery", while Bailey stated that the "graphics are brilliantly rendered and whiz by smoothly". Buchanan called Flight Unlimited's terrain "just superb" and Vizard described it as "amazingly real". Buchanan believed that "what you hear in Flight Unlimited is every bit as good as what you see", thanks to "utterly convincing" sound effects. Atkin praised the instructor as "one of the best uses of voice ever in a multimedia title".

Bailey wrote that the game needs "a real beefy machine" to run properly; Atkin stated that the "massive horsepower requirement will restrict many gamers to lower resolutions and detail levels". Bob and John Nolan similarly found that the game "hogs computing power". Buchanan wrote that the system requirements listed on the back of the game's box "must be a joke", and that a high-performance computer is necessary to run the game. In 1996, PC Gamer US presented the game with a "Special Achievement in Graphics" award. The editors wrote, "While it requires the most sophisticated computer hardware on the market to be enjoyed, Flight Unlimited rewards gamers with some of the most stunning scenery ever seen in a flight sim."

== Aftermath ==
Flight Unlimited was the first of three self-published titles released by Looking Glass Technologies. However, the next two products, Terra Nova: Strike Force Centauri (1996) and British Open Championship Golf (1997), were commercial failures. As a result, the company ceased self-publishing and was left in dire financial circumstances. Doug Church later explained that Looking Glass' attempt to publish came at a difficult time for the video game industry: "the other mid-sized publishers were mostly going out of business or getting bought". He believed that the company had been "overreaching itself" with the venture, and that it was "being a little overambitious and a little cocky".

=== Sequels ===
Flight Unlimited was intended to be followed by a combat-oriented sequel, which was developed under the working title Flight Combat. In 1995, Seamus Blackley told PC Gamer US that he wanted the game to "feel so real that pilots will be afraid. They'll feel the gun hits." Talking to Computer Gaming World, he stated that the game would teach players the "same curriculum [as] the Air Force", and that it would feature competitive online play. However, a company manager, newly instated by venture capital investors who disliked Looking Glass' management style, instead demanded that Blackley create a direct sequel to Flight Unlimited. The two argued regularly, and Blackley later accused the manager of "ripp[ing] the guts out of Looking Glass". In response to Blackley's refusal to create Flight Unlimited II, the manager fired him. Blackley left the company in late 1995 with designer Austin Grossman, and both were hired by DreamWorks Interactive to create Jurassic Park: Trespasser. He later spearheaded development of the Xbox at Microsoft.

Constantine Hantzopoulos directed Flight Unlimited II, which was published by Eidos Interactive in 1997. The team could not continue using the real-time computational fluid dynamics of Flight Unlimited because, according to Hantzopoulos, it was "all black box spaghetti code from Seamus". The aerobatics focus of its predecessor was dropped in favor of general civilian aviation. The development of Flight Combat was hinted at during the production of Flight Unlimited II. A third game, Flight Unlimited III, was published by Electronic Arts in 1999; and it continued the focus on general aviation. That year, Flight Combat was officially announced as the World War II-themed, Electronic Arts-published Flight Combat: Thunder Over Europe, but its name was eventually changed to Jane's Attack Squadron. The game was canceled as a consequence of Looking Glass Studios' closure in 2000. However, it was later finished by developer Mad Doc Software and released in 2002 by publisher Xicat Interactive.
