= Microsoft Flight Simulator 98 =

1997 video game

- German cover
- Developer: Microsoft
- Publisher: Microsoft
- Series: Microsoft Flight Simulator
- Platform: Windows
- Release: NA: September 17, 1997; UK: September 25, 1997
- Genre: Flight simulation
- Mode: Single-player

Microsoft Flight Simulator 98, abbreviated commonly as FS98, is a flight simulator video game released in September 1997 for Microsoft Windows.

== Gameplay ==
Flight Simulator 98 (version 6.1) is generally regarded as a "service release", offering minor improvements, with a few notable exceptions: The simulator now also featured a helicopter (the Bell 206B III JetRanger), as well as a generally improved interface for adding additional aircraft, sceneries, and sounds.

Other new "out of the box" aircraft included a revised Cessna 182 with a photorealistic instrument panel and updated flight model. The primary rationale for updating the 182 was Cessna's return to manufacturing that model in the late 1990s. The Learjet Model 45 business jet was also included, replacing the aging Learjet 35 from earlier versions. The Dynamic Scenery models were also vastly improved. One of the most noticeable improvements in this version was the ability to have independent panels and sounds for every aircraft.

A major expansion of the in-box scenery was also included in this release, including approximately 45 detailed cities (many located outside the United States, some of which had been included in separate scenery enhancement packs), as well as an increase in the modeled airports to over 3000 worldwide, compared with the approximately 300 in earlier versions. This major increase in scenery production was attributable partially to inclusion of the content from previous standalone scenery packs, as well as new contributions by MicroScene, a company in San Ramon, California who had developed several scenery expansions released by Microsoft. The scenery files for FS95 are forwards compatible with FS98.

This release also included support for the Microsoft Sidewinder Pro Force Feedback joystick, which allowed the player to receive some sensory input from simulated trim forces on the aircraft controls.

This was the first version to take advantage of 3D-graphic cards, through Microsoft's DirectX technology. With such combination of hardware and software, FS98 not only achieved better performance, but also implemented better haze/visibility effects, "virtual cockpit" views, texture filtering, and sunrise/sunset effects.

== Reception ==
Reception

Review scores
Publication	Score
Computer Gaming World	3.5/5
GameSpot	7.9/10
PC Zone	94/100
GameStar	76%
Gamezilla	89/100
PC Joker	77%

By November 1997, Flight Simulator 98 had shipped one million units, following its September launch. It received a "Gold" award from the Verband der Unterhaltungssoftware Deutschland (VUD) in August 1998, for sales of at least 100,000 units across Germany, Austria, and Switzerland. The VUD raised it to "Platinum" status, indicating 200,000 sales, by November.

Pete Deemer for GameSpot said "Microsoft Flight Simulator 98 is an impressive feat. With a few exceptions, gone are the glaring flaws of the previous version; coupled with its technological innovations, the sum of the parts is a unique flight experience of unprecedented realism."

Denny Atkin for Computer Gaming World summarized: "Overall, though, this is a worthwhile update for FLIGHT SIMULATOR fans who have fast 3D cards."

Dave Mathieson for PC Zone summarized: "[...] Flight Sim 98 is the most realistic sim around of any type, and the sheer size of this version, combined with lovely graphics, make it a bit of a must for anyone even remotely interested in flying planes."

During the AIAS' inaugural Interactive Achievement Awards, Microsoft Flight Simulator 98 won "PC Simulation Game of the Year", along with nominations for "Computer Entertainment Title of the Year" and "Outstanding Achievement in Software Engineering".

== See also ==
- Flight Unlimited II
- Sierra Pro Pilot 98: The Complete Flight Simulator
