= Microsoft Flight Simulator for Windows 95 =

1996 video game

- Developer: Microsoft
- Publisher: Microsoft
- Series: Microsoft Flight Simulator
- Platform: Windows
- Release: UK: October 24, 1996; NA: November 7, 1996
- Genre: Flight simulation
- Mode: Single-player

Microsoft Flight Simulator for Windows 95, abbreviated commonly as FS95 or FSW95, is a flight simulator video game released in late 1996 for Windows.

With the release of Windows 95, a new version (6.0) was developed for that platform. Although this was essentially just a port from the DOS version (FS5.1), it did feature a vastly improved frame-rate, better haze, and additional aircraft, including the Extra 300 aerobatic aircraft.

This was the first version released after the purchase of Bruce Artwick Organization (BAO) by Microsoft, and after having physically relocated BAO development staff to Microsoft's primary campus in Redmond, Washington. The BAO team was integrated with other non-BAO Microsoft staff, such as project management, testing, and artwork.

Additional scenery included major airports outside Europe and the US for the first time. The scenery packs for 5.0 are backwards compatible with this release.

More scenery and aircraft. Notice the texture mapped runway, aircraft, and sky, and high density of 3-D buildings.

== Reception ==
Reception

Review scores
Publication	Score
Computer Gaming World	3.5/5
PC Gamer (UK)	89%
PC Games (DE)	77%
CD-Action	6/10

John Nolan for Computer Gaming World gave the game 3½ stars out of 5 and said "Flight Simulator provides the best all-aspect civilian flying experience presently available. If you don't own an earlier version and you're interested in this type of aviation, the choice is a complete no-brainer – at least until Sierra's PRO PILOT arrives to provide some stiff competition later this year. If you already have a recent version of the program, the choice is more difficult. The improvements are incremental, and you'll have to decide if the new interface, aircraft and videos are worth the price of admission."
