= Flight Unlimited II =

1997 video game

- Box art
- Developer: Looking Glass Studios
- Publisher: Eidos Interactive
- Director: Constantine Hantzopoulos
- Producer: Joseph Gilby
- Designers: Constantine Hantzopoulos; Edward F. Tatro
- Programmer: James Wiley Fleming
- Artist: Bhavin Patel
- Composers: Tom Streit; Kemal Amarasingham
- Platform: Windows 95
- Release: November 24, 1997
- Genre: Amateur flight simulator
- Mode: Single player

Flight Unlimited II is a 1997 flight simulator video game developed by Looking Glass Studios and published by Eidos Interactive. The player controls one of five planes in the airspace of the San Francisco Bay Area, which is shared with up to 600 artificially intelligent aircraft directed by real-time air traffic control. The game eschews the aerobatics focus of its predecessor, Flight Unlimited, in favor of general civilian aviation. As such, new physics code and an engine were developed, the former because the programmer of Flight Unlimited's computational fluid dynamics system, Seamus Blackley, had left the company.

The team sought to create an immersive world for the player and to compete with the Microsoft Flight Simulator series. Commercially, Flight Unlimited II performed well enough to recoup its development costs. Critics lauded the game's graphics and simulated airspace, and several praised its physics. However, some considered the game to be inferior to Microsoft Flight Simulator 98. Following the completion of Flight Unlimited II, its team split up to develop Flight Unlimited III (1999) and Flight Combat (later Jane's Attack Squadron) simultaneously. Both projects were troubled, and they contributed to the closure of Looking Glass in May 2000.

== Gameplay ==
The player flies a Cessna 172 in IFR mode in the rain.

Flight Unlimited II is a flight simulator video game: its gameplay is a simulation of piloting real-world planes. Players may control the Piper PA-28R-200, de Havilland Canada DHC-2 Beaver, Beechcraft Baron 58, North American P-51D Mustang or Cessna 172. The interactive cockpit of each plane is based on its real-world counterpart, and it contains simulated flight instruments such as an airspeed indicator, a heading indicator and a VOR indicator, among others. The player begins by engaging in a Quick Flight or by using the fixed-base operator (FBO) interface. In a Quick Flight, the player selects a plane and the flying conditions before taking off; the FBO interface features additional options, such as lessons, flight plans and adventures. The game's six lessons detail such maneuvers as takeoffs and taxiing. Adventures are pre-built missions, with objectives such as landing on an aircraft carrier, helping a prisoner to escape from Alcatraz Island or dropping turkeys into Candlestick Park. There are 25 adventures in total.

The game is set in a reproduction of 11,000 square miles of the San Francisco Bay Area. The player may land at or takeoff from the area's 46 airports. Weather conditions such as rain, wind and fog are simulated. Players share the game's airspace with up to 600 artificially intelligent (AI) planes, which fly and respond to the player in real-time. Real-time air traffic control (ATC) directs the player and the AI planes to prevent collisions. The player interacts with the ATC and with other planes by constructing radio messages with a menu. Three cockpit views are available: IFR (instrument flight rules), which allows the player to monitor and interact with all flight instruments; VFR (visual flight rules), which features a larger windshield area but fewer flight instruments; and Virtual Cockpit View, which allows free look but features no interactive flight instruments. External camera angles are also available, and the player may ride as a passenger in any AI plane.

== Development ==
Following the completion of Flight Unlimited in 1995, project leader Seamus Blackley planned to use that game's computational fluid dynamics (CFDs) code to create a combat flight simulator called Flight Combat. However, a new manager at Looking Glass Studios demanded that Blackley instead design a direct sequel to Flight Unlimited. Blackley refused and was fired, leaving the company in late 1995. Constantine Hantzopoulos became the lead designer and project leader of the fourteen-member Flight Unlimited II team. The team eschewed the aerobatics focus of their previous game in favor of general civilian aviation, in order to compete with the Microsoft Flight Simulator series. Looking Glass announced the game on December 18, 1996. It was slated to include 6 planes, 45 airports and 8,500 square miles of terrain from the San Francisco Bay Area. The Bay Area was chosen because of its varied landscape and numerous airports. In January 1997, Eidos Interactive partnered with Looking Glass to provide the game's marketing and distribution.

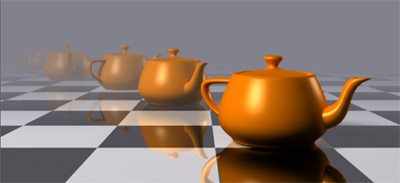
A distance fog algorithm (like the one demonstrated above) had been used to improve the frame rate of Flight Unlimited, but the ZOAR renderer developed for Flight Unlimited II made this unnecessary.

The team opted not to reuse the technology of Flight Unlimited. Hantzopoulos learned from Blackley that it was necessary to recreate the "visceral feel" of real flight, but Blackley's CFDs system was "all black box spaghetti code" that the team could not understand. Programmer Jim Berry, who had previously worked on simulators such as Falcon 4.0, wrote new physics code based on force vector calculations to replace the CFDs system. To gather data for the new physics, Hantzopoulos and Berry flew in real-world planes with designer Ed Tatro and aerobatic pilot Michael Goulian. James Fleming coded Flight Unlimited II's new terrain renderer, ZOAR. Flight Unlimited uses distance fog to limit visible terrain, but this causes pop-in issues that the team sought to avoid in the sequel. Instead of removing textures that exceed the draw distance, the new engine uses mipmapping to lower the polygon count of distant terrain. This increases the viewable area and allowed the team to use fog as an atmospheric effect, rather than as a "crutch".

The team's goal was to create the "best, most realistic civilian flight simulator", which would provide an immersive world for the player. Radio communications between ATCs, AI planes and the player occur in real-time: a "sophisticated audio splicing system" gathers pre-recorded voice fragments into contextually appropriate sentences. The team recorded the engine noise of each of the game's planes, and they designed cockpits more interactive than those in Flight Unlimited. Roughly 300 times more terrain area was included in Flight Unlimited II than in its predecessor. To generate the terrain, the team combined digital elevation maps with satellite imagery rendered at four square meters per pixel. The images were taken at 9:30 am, because the long shadows provided an illusion of depth. 3D models were used for all buildings taller than nine stories. Because of the terrain detail, the game was the first to allow players to follow VFR. Initially, the team planned to include only VFR flight, but they later enabled IFR to "ease navigation". The team hoped to add more terrain and planes and a multiplayer feature after the game's release.

The game was shown at the Electronic Entertainment Expo in June 1997, alongside Thief: The Dark Project. At the show, the team detailed early plans to include missions. The game was well received, and Combatsim praised it as "the next level in civilian flight sims". Denny Atkin of Computer Gaming World liked the game, but he questioned Looking Glass's decision to compete in the civilian rather than the combat flight simulators market. That August, Looking Glass merged with Intermetrics, a technology company that hoped to branch into the video game industry. The merger came amid financial difficulties; a large portion of the Looking Glass staff was laid off during the middle of 1997. Looking Glass's Tim Stellmach and Paul Neurath described the merger as amicable, and the former noted that "through the whole deal everyone was really psyched about both The Dark Project and Flight Unlimited II". In September, Eidos took over publishing duties on Flight Unlimited II, as a result of Looking Glass's new business model with Intermetrics. The game was released on November 24, 1997.

== Reception ==
Reception

Review scores
Publication	Score
Computer Gaming World	4.5/5
Edge	9/10
PC Gamer (UK)	91%
PC Gamer (US)	92%
PC Zone	8.4 out of 10
Computer Games Magazine	3.5/5

Award
Publication	Award
Computer Gaming World	Simulation Game of the Year 1997 (runner-up)

Flight Unlimited II was placed in direct competition with the Microsoft Flight Simulator series and Sierra Entertainment's Pro Pilot, and it performed well enough to recoup its development costs. PC Gamer US's Stephen Poole commented that the limited environments of Flight Unlimited did not create a believable flight experience, but that the "exquisite terrain, impressive flight-physics models, and meticulous attention to the details and procedures of civilian aviation" in Flight Unlimited II created "the closest experience to actual flight" available. He praised the game's ATC system, which he considered to be "so real that it's almost scary". Poole summarized, "Flight Unlimited II is so impressive that to even whine about little details shows a shortsightedness that's all too common amongst us gamers."

Denny Atkin of Computer Gaming World believed the game to be the first simulator to recreate "the real feeling of civilian flying", particularly because of its graphics and ATC system. He considered its flight physics to be "much better than Pro Pilot, although not up to the level of Flight Simulator 98". He finished by calling Flight Unlimited II "a must-have for any general-aviation enthusiast." John Nolan of Computer Games Magazine found that the new flight physics were "more than adequate for the task at hand", despite certain "questionable areas". He praised the graphics and ATC, but noted AI glitches with the latter. He summarized, "Overall, this simulation is somewhat above average". Dean Evans of PC Gamer UK called it "the best civilian flight sim we've ever seen", which makes "Flight Simulator look like a sack of old spam". He found the game to be "immensely realistic" and praised its terrain and simulated airspace. Similarly, Edge praised the believable and highly detailed environment, noting that Looking Glass Studios managed to cleverly soften the contrast between photo-captured textures and polygon objects "using haze as a real effect rather than a distance-clipping cheat". The magazine concluded that dismissing the game simply because of its lack of weapons "would be a mistake", and explained that the interaction with the world "is everything—it's reward enough simply to explore rather than to destroy."

PC Zone's Paul Presley believed the game to be inferior to combat flight simulators and stated that it "isn't nearly as deep or varied as Microsoft's Flight Simulator '98". He found the graphics to be lackluster and the terrain to be "a bit empty", which he believed damaged the game's atmosphere. However, he noted that Flight Unlimited II's "underlying playability" made it "worthwhile" and "addictive". Presley summarized, "[A]s a time-waster, a novelty item or an office toy, it does the job and it does it well." Jonathan Gordon of The Independent wrote, "The original Flight Unlimited promised much but delivered relatively little, and it's a similar story with this sequel." He noted that the graphics, while good from a distance, became "disappointingly bland" up close; and he found the game to be limited compared to Microsoft Flight Simulator '98.

Flight Unlimited II was a runner-up for Computer Gaming World's 1997 "Simulation Game of the Year" award, which ultimately went to Longbow 2. The editors called Flight Unlimited II "the first aviation sim to truly capture the environment of real civilian flying". In December 1998, Arcade named it the best flight simulation game.

== Aftermath ==
In April 1998, Looking Glass released a patch for Flight Unlimited II that included six new adventures, a new plane (the Fokker Dr.I) and an "Adventure Builder Kit", which allowed players to construct their own adventures and to share them online. The patch also added moving objects on the ground. After completing Flight Unlimited II, certain members of the game's team wanted to develop Flight Unlimited III, while others wanted to create Flight Combat. Looking Glass split the team in two and expanded both with new hires, so that the games could be developed simultaneously. Flight Unlimited III lead designer Peter James later wrote that his project's development was troubled, in part because of a lack of interest from company management. It became one of Looking Glass's biggest commercial failures. Flight Combat (renamed Jane's Attack Squadron) struggled through a long and costly development cycle. Both projects contributed to Looking Glass's closure in May 2000. Mad Doc Software later completed Jane's Attack Squadron, and it was published by Xicat Interactive in March 2002.
