= Flight Unlimited III =

1999 video game

- Developer: Looking Glass Studios
- Publisher: Electronic Arts
- Director: Tom Sperry
- Producer: Sandra B. Smith
- Designers: Peter James; Tom Sperry
- Programmer: Pat McElhatton
- Artist: Duncan Hsu
- Composers: Kemal Amarasingham; David Bax; Eric Brosius; Ramin Djawadi
- Platform: Microsoft Windows
- Release: September 17, 1999
- Genre: Amateur flight simulator
- Mode: Single-player

Flight Unlimited III is a 1999 flight simulator video game developed by Looking Glass Studios and published by Electronic Arts. It allows players to pilot simulations of real-world commercial and civilian aircraft in and around Seattle, Washington, United States. Players can fly freely or engage in "Challenge" missions, such as thwarting a theft or locating Bigfoot. The development team built on the general aviation gameplay of Flight Unlimited II, with more detailed physics and terrain, more planes, and a real-time weather system. Roughly half of Flight Unlimited II's team returned to work on the sequel, supported by new hires.

Lead designer Peter James described Flight Unlimited III's development as a struggle, thanks to a lack of interest from Electronic Arts and from Looking Glass's management. Placed in direct competition with Microsoft Flight Simulator 2000 and Fly!, the game failed to capture sufficient market share. It became one of Looking Glass's biggest commercial flops, with roughly 20,000 units sold in the United States during 1999. This contributed to the company's closure in 2000. The game was well received by critics, who praised its terrain rendering and dynamic weather. Its simulated physics were lauded by several reviewers, but others felt that the physics were imprecise and that the game's system requirements were extremely high.

== Gameplay ==
The player flies over Mount Rainier in the Beechcraft Baron 58, using visual navigation

Flight Unlimited III is a three-dimensional (3D) flight simulator video game, in which the player pilots virtual reproductions of real-world planes. Players may control ten aircraft: the Lake Turbo Renegade, Stemme S10, Mooney Bravo, Fokker Dr.I, Beechjet 400A, and five planes first included in Flight Unlimited II. Plane cockpits feature simulated flight instruments such as variometers and primary flight displays, and allow for both visual and instrument navigation. The main airspace is 10,000 square miles of Seattle terrain; eight other Western American states are modeled as well, albeit in less detail. The California scenery from Flight Unlimited II may be imported to expand the airspace. The player shares the game's skies with artificially intelligent (AI) planes. Real-time, interactive air traffic control monitors the player's actions and tries to prevent mid-air collisions. Before a flight, the player may select which types of weather to encounter. Weather conditions such as cold fronts and thunderstorms develop in real-time.

In addition to the default "Quick Flight" mode, the player may play tutorial and "Challenge" missions. The game's tutorial mode features 26 lessons, which demonstrate basic and advanced flying techniques and then allow the player to perform them. Challenge missions test the player's flying ability with objectives such as locating Bigfoot, rescuing a stranded hiker, stopping a theft, or flying through hoops. Eleven Challenges are available, but the player may create more or download them from the Internet. Flight Unlimited III includes the level editor ("FLED") used to develop the game, which allows players to use the game's assets to create airports, AI flight paths, and edited landscapes. Players may share their creations online.

== Development ==
Following the release of Flight Unlimited II in 1997, certain members of that game's team wanted to move on to Flight Unlimited III, while others wanted to create the combat flight simulation game Flight Combat. Looking Glass Studios chose to develop the games simultaneously: the team was split into two, both supplemented with new hires. The company then surveyed customers to determine where Flight Unlimited III should take place, among other things. In May 1998, Electronic Arts was announced as the game's publisher, as part of a multi-title marketing and distribution deal that also included System Shock 2. Looking Glass's goal was to build on the foundation of Flight Unlimited II and to provide what project leader Tom Sperry called "the true joy and sensation of flight in the most realistic environment available". The company first displayed Flight Unlimited III at the MicroWINGS Conference in August 1998. At the show, the game was revealed to take place in and around Seattle—a choice based on fan requests and on the varied landscape and weather of Puget Sound. Looking Glass also discussed new planes, moving objects on the ground, and a real-time, physics-based weather system.

Former flight instructor Peter James, who had worked on Flight Unlimited II, assumed the role of lead designer. He was largely responsible for Flight Unlimited III's lessons, planes, and simulated flight instruments. James believed that other flight simulators had holes with regard to realism, and he hoped to create a more accurate experience. Photographs were captured of each plane's real-world counterpart, and construction of the 3D plane models was led by artist Duncan Hsu, a former car modeler at Papyrus Design Group. The flight physics were coded by Kevin Wasserman and involve real-time calculations of force vectors, such as those acting against a plane's yaw, pitch, and roll. This system was more advanced than that of Flight Unlimited II, which was also based on force calculations. The physics code was informed by "real aircraft data" and the personal experience of pilots, and each of the planes was flown as research for the game. Because the plane cockpits of previous Flight Unlimited games had been criticized by pilots, the team tried to make Flight Unlimited III's cockpits extremely authentic. Kemal Amarasingham recorded the planes' sound effects, which he said involved "risking his life" by standing near jet engines and underwings.

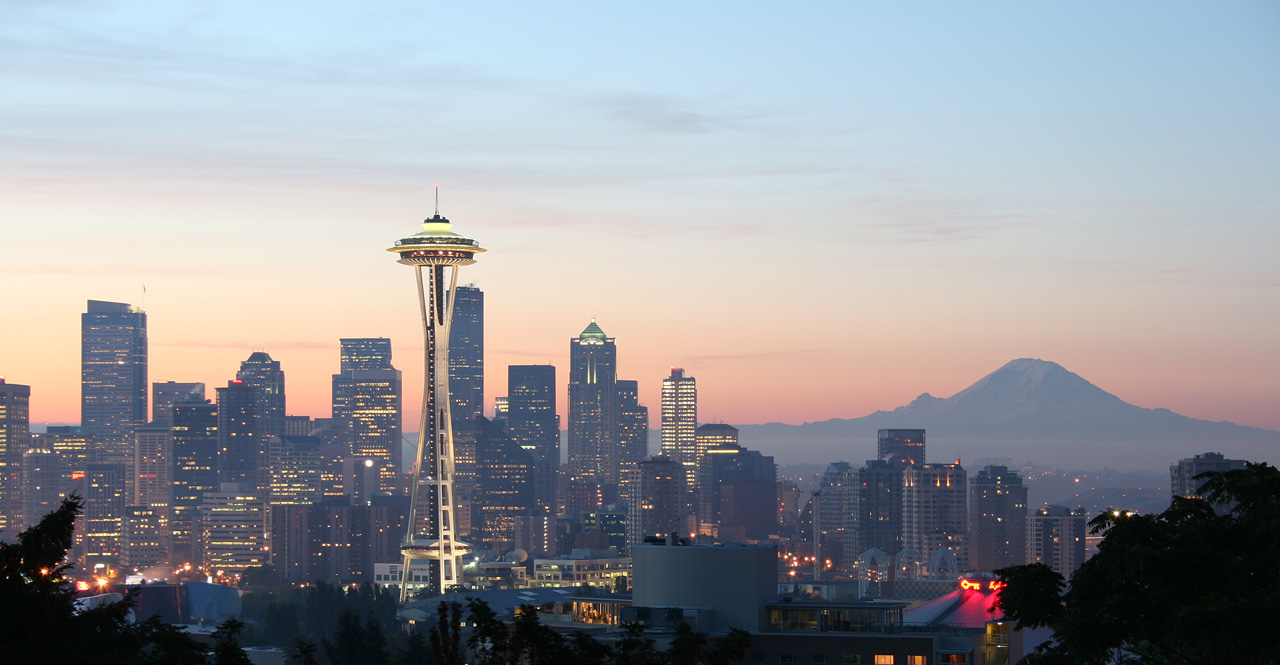
Seattle was selected as the main setting of Flight Unlimited III partly because of its varied weather and landscape

The game's terrain texture maps were made with satellite images rendered at four square meters per pixel, the highest resolution used in a flight simulator at that time. Artist Karen Wolff designed the terrain by combining large topographic maps into a "mosaic", which recreated the elevations and depressions of the Seattle area. The satellite imagery was layered over the resultant polygonal mesh. Real elevation data was also used for the eight lower-resolution Western American states outside of the Seattle area. Budget concerns and the storage limitations of the CD-ROM format prevented the team from rendering the entire United States, despite fan demand. The 3D objects that move across the terrain were created by Yoosun Cho, who used numerous photography books for inspiration. Flight Unlimited III's object editor let her set these objects to "move once along the path, back and forth or cycle". The weather system, co-designed by James, generates, moves, and disperses weather fronts based on real-time calculations of atmospheric conditions such as humidity and orographic lift.

=== Management and final months ===
While visiting Looking Glass to cover Flight Unlimited III's development, journalist Dan Linton was impressed by the team management of Tom Sperry, producer Sandra Smith, and vice president of marketing Michael Malizola. He wrote that they employed "suggestion and encouragement" instead of "demands", and he believed that their work was in large part responsible for the game "setting a new standard in the industry". Peter James later accused the wider company's management of being lukewarm toward Flight Unlimited III during development, since their biggest sellers were action-oriented games like Thief: The Dark Project. He claimed that their lack of interest turned the optimistic team into a "grumbling group of depressed and sometimes angry [people]". Although he, Smith, and Perry petitioned the company's managers to plan future add-ons and third-party development for the game, James felt that they were ignored. James developed concepts for a sequel in his spare time, but his ideas were shelved to wait for Flight Unlimited III's sales figures, which had to surpass those of Microsoft Flight Simulator 2000 for Flight Unlimited IV to be greenlit. James believed that this was "foolish", particularly because he felt that Electronic Arts undermarketed the game. He wrote that Flight Unlimited III's marketing manager had "great plans" but that his "hands seem[ed] tied".

Flight Unlimited III's official site was opened in March 1999, and the game was shown alongside Flight Combat: Thunder Over Europe at the Electronic Entertainment Expo in May. Tal Blevins of IGN wrote that the game had "come a long way" since he had seen it earlier in the year, and that it was almost complete, with development of the real-time weather system in its final stages. Full Throttle noted the game's "impressive clouds" and "slick looking" HUD. Flight Unlimited III was shown again at EAA AirVenture Oshkosh in July, at which point beta testing was nearly complete and the game was "90% done", according to James. He stated that the public reaction was "great", which energized the team for a short time. The game went gold that August, nine months behind schedule. James wrote that the team celebrated with a small dinner party, and that "the next few days were spent finding out how many people [were] quitting." He left after the game's completion to join Flightsim.com, a news and review website dedicated to flight simulators. The game was released on September 17, 1999.

== Reception ==
Reception

Review scores
Publication	Score
Computer Gaming World	4.5/5
GameSpot	9.1 out of 10
IGN	9 out of 10
PC Gamer (UK)	92%
PC Zone	9 out of 10
Computer Games Magazine	4.5/5

Awards
Publication	Award
Computer Gaming World	Simulation of the Year 1999 (runner-up)
PC Gamer US	Best Simulation 1999 (runner-up)
GameSpot	Simulation of the Year (runner-up)

Flight Unlimited III was placed in direct competition with flight simulators such as Fly! and Microsoft Flight Simulator 2000. The game failed to capture sufficient market share and became one of Looking Glass's biggest commercial flops. It sold roughly 20,000 copies in the United States during 1999. The game later earned a "Silver" sales award from the Entertainment and Leisure Software Publishers Association (ELSPA), indicating sales of at least 100,000 copies in the United Kingdom. Together with the costly development of Flight Combat, the game's low sales used up Looking Glass's earnings from Thief: The Dark Project and System Shock 2, which had helped them recover from the failures of British Open Championship Golf and Terra Nova: Strike Force Centauri. These events contributed to the company's bankruptcy and closure in May 2000. The game was, however, positively received by critics, with an aggregate review score of 88% on GameRankings.

Josh Nolan of Computer Gaming World wrote, "FU3 is experience-oriented: it's user-friendly, graphically glamorous, and lots of fun." While he praised its visuals and air traffic control, he considered the game to be simpler than Flight Simulator 2000 because of its less detailed lessons, interfaces, and flight physics. The magazine later nominated Flight Unlimited III as the 1999 "Simulation of the Year". Writing for Computer Games Magazine, Denny Atkin stated that the use of turbulence "really sets FU3 apart from the competition", and that the game's simulation of air traffic is "like no other sim". He praised its graphics and dynamic weather, and he found the flight physics solid in general but "overly gentle" for aerobatic maneuvers. He concluded, "It's not only an excellent simulus of general aviation flying, ... it's even a good game." PC Gamer UK's Dean Evans wrote that the game has "a poetic grandeur", as well as an "astonishing attention to detail" greater than that of its predecessors. He praised its flight lessons and weather, and he considered the graphics to be "unbelievably delicious". Evans summarized the game as "the most breathtaking flying experience you can get for a PC."

Simon Bradley of PC Zone wrote, "FUIII has atmosphere in a way that MS Combat Flight Sim can't even dream of." He praised its graphics, flight physics, and detailed flight environment. He also complained of "unflyably slow frame rates" and warned that the game could not be played on older computers. Tony Lopez of GameSpot called the game's environmental modeling "simply breathtaking" and noted that elevations were rendered more smoothly than in Fly! or Microsoft Flight Simulator. He wrote that the game's flight physics and weather simulation were superior to those of any other flight simulator and that the "powerful, easy-to-use" FLED editing tool could popularize the game. IGN writer Marc Saltzman commented that the game features "absolutely stunning terrain at all altitudes, realistic weather and lighting effects, and highly-detailed planes". Saltzman praised the accuracy of Flight Unlimited III's physics but remarked that the game's frame rate was "noticeably slower" than that of its rivals.
