= Fly! =

Flight simulator software

- Developer: Terminal Reality
- Publisher: Gathering of Developers
- Producers: Brett Combs; Richard Harvey
- Programmer: Richard Harvey
- Artist: Terry Simmons
- Platforms: Windows, Macintosh
- Release: Windows: NA: July 28, 1999; EU: August 6, 1999; Macintosh: NA: September 20, 1999
- Genre: Flight simulation
- Mode: Single-player

Fly! is a flight simulator video game for Windows and Macintosh developed by Terminal Reality and published by Gathering of Developers.

== Gameplay ==
Hawker 800 in flight over Oahu, Hawaii

It includes simulation of air traffic control features as well as aircraft's on-board systems, and was acclaimed for its highly detailed fully working interactive cockpits. Featured aircraft are fixed-wing light to medium aircraft. An enhanced version, Fly! 2K, and add-on, Wilco's 737 for Fly!, were released in 2000. Fly! 2K added user-created add-ons, enhanced graphics, real world and real-time weather generation via the ability to import METAR reports from NOAA, and support for Roger Wilco. The improvements were made available for owners of the original Fly! via a free patch. Another version titled Fly! 2K: German Edition was released in early 2001. It added Ruhr area to the game. It is intended to replace the Fly! 2 main program (exe) and remain fully compatible with previous versions, scenery, aircraft, etc. The first publicly available version was released in 2010.

== Development ==
The game was in development for more than three years. It was developed by a team of 20 people.

== Reception ==
Fly!

Aggregate score
Aggregator	Score
GameRankings	66% 67% (2K)

Review scores
Publication	Score
4Players	65/100 (2K: German Edition)
AllGame	2.5/5
Computer Games Strategy Plus	3/5
Computer Gaming World	3.5/5
Gamekult	8/10 (2K)
GamePro	3.5/5
GameSpot	7.9/10
GameSpy	86/100 (2K)
GameStar	68% (2K); 70% (2K: German Edition)
IGN	4.8/10 (PC); 6/10 (Mac)
Jeuxvideo.com	18/20
MacLife	"F.A."
Macworld	3.5/5
PC Games (DE)	69% (2K: German Edition)
PC Zone	70%
PC Player (Germany)	55/100 (2K); 60/100 (2K: German Edition)

Fly! and Fly! 2K received mixed or average reviews according to the review aggregation website GameRankings. It sold 93,000 units by October 2001.

== Sequel ==
Fly! II is a sequel to Fly! released on April 26, 2001 for Windows and Macintosh. Macintosh version was distributed by MacSoft. Said sequel and Fly! 2K sold combined 47,000 units by October 2001.

=== Reception ===
Fly! II

Aggregate score
Aggregator	Score
GameRankings	56%

Review scores
Publication	Score
Computer Gaming World	2/5
Gamekult	6/10
GameSpot	6.0/10
GameStar	52% 53% (German Edition)
Jeuxvideo.com	13/20
Inside Mac Games	6.75/10
MacAddict	4/5

Danny Atkin for Computer Gaming World said "Fly! II is this year's poster child for programs shoved out the door before completion–publisher Gathering of Developers not only shipped FLY! II with bugs and missing features, it even left out most of the manual. The shame of it all is that the finished parts are quite good, and developer Terminal Reality has been very quick to post patches and missing terrain data."

== See also ==
- Flight Unlimited III
- Microsoft Flight Simulator 2000
- Microsoft Flight Simulator 2002
- X-Plane
