= Pro Pilot 99 =

- Developer: Dynamix
- Publisher: Sierra On Line
- Designer: Mark Pechnick
- Platform: Windows
- Release: November 1998
- Genre: Simulation

Pro Pilot 99 is a 1998 video game developed by Dynamix and published by Sierra On Line.

== Gameplay ==
The player pilots one of six aircraft and can fly to thousands of destinations worldwide, following general aviation guidelines, using real‑world geography, and relying on navigational systems such as GPS, ILS, NDB, and VOR to complete flights across more than 4,300 airports and numerous metropolitan and scenic regions. The simulation provides 3D‑accelerated visuals, detailed flight‑planning tools, and a pop‑up operator's handbook containing extensive procedural information, while tutorials and manuals cover training topics ranging from basic flight skills to instrument procedures and cross‑country navigation.

== Development ==
Pro Pilot 99 was announced in July 1998. It was released in November 1998.

== Reception ==
Reception

Review scores
Publication	Score
Computer Gaming World	3.5/5
Computer Games Magazine	3/5
Daily Record	9/10
GameSpot	7.5/10
IGN	5.8/10
Jeuxvideo	9/20
Power Play	89%
PC Player	69%

Games Domain called Pro Pilot 99 a good game despite its faults. GameSpot liked the improved features over Sierra Pro Pilot.
