= Car and Driver (video game) =

1992 video game

- Developer: Lerner Research
- Publisher: Electronic Arts
- Programmers: Michael Kulas; Matthew Toschlog
- Platform: MS-DOS
- Release: 1992
- Genre: Racing
- Modes: Single-player, multiplayer

Car and Driver is a racing video game for MS-DOS developed by Lerner Research and published by Electronic Arts in 1992.

== Gameplay ==
The game's title screen and menus are designed to imitate the appearance of pages in a Car and Driver magazine issue. Selecting a car directs the player to a full-length review or retrospective of the vehicle by a Car and Driver editor alongside detailed technical statistics. The game features 10 controllable cars: The Porsche 959, Toyota MR2, Ferrari F40, Lotus Esprit, Ferrari 250 Testarossa, Shelby Cobra, Lamborghini Countach, Eagle Talon, Corvette ZR-1, and Mercedes-Benz C11. The game showcases 10 "tracks", although small sections of famous driving roads such as California Route 1 and even a parking lot are included as playable areas. Of particular note is the strange Dobbs Raceway, which takes its name from the Church of the Subgenius parody religion's figurehead J.R. "Bob" Dobbs and appears to have been an inside joke by the developers. The side of the track is adorned with gigantic images of Dobbs, Subgenius propaganda, and low-flying aircraft.

== Reception ==
Reception

Review score
Publication	Score
Power Unlimited	90%

Computer Gaming World praised the game's realism and controls, stating that it "offers more interesting cars than any competing driving software". Power Unlimited gave the game a score of 90% commenting: "Car & Driver was one of the best racing games of its time. Cars and backgrounds looked fantastic and a very high speed could be achieved. The perfect pastime for a car thief in jail."
