= Sierra Pro Pilot =

1997 video game

- Developer: Dynamix
- Publisher: Sierra On Line
- Platform: Windows
- Release: December 5, 1997
- Genre: Flight simulation
- Mode: Single-player

Sierra Pro Pilot: The Complete Flight Simulator (also known as simply Pro Pilot or Pro Pilot '98) is a 1997 video game developed by Dynamix and published by Sierra On Line. Two other games in the Pro Pilot series were released in 1998: Pro Pilot USA and Pro Pilot 99.

== Gameplay ==
Pro Pilot delivers a general aviation simulation, spotlighting cockpit fidelity and procedural authenticity. Players can pilot five aircraft—including classics like the Cessna 172 and the CitationJet 525—while navigating with realistic instrumentation such as dual COMM/NAV radios and a pioneering built-in GPS. The experience leans heavily into IFR training, featuring VOR and NDB beacons and the ability to tune into air traffic control. The sim also offers over 3,000 airports across the U.S. and parts of Canada. Graphically, Pro Pilot uses a low-res 640x480 setting. Features like engine vibration add immersion.

== Reception ==
Reception

Review scores
Publication	Score
Computer Games Magazine	3/5
Computer Gaming World	2.5/5
GameSpot	6.1/10
PC Joker	58%
PC Gamer	53%

GameSpot gave Sierra Pro Pilot a score of 6.1 out of 10 stating "With the glaring omissions fixed and a graphics overhaul, Pro Pilot could be contender. As it stands now, it's primarily of interest to potential student pilots looking for a good instrument flying simulator." Games Domain recommended Sierra Pro Pilot to fans of Flight Simulator.

Sierra Pro Pilot sold more than 275,000 units.

Sierra Pro Pilot ranked 17th on PC Data's list of Top-Selling Games Software for February 1998.

== See also ==
- Microsoft Flight Simulator 98
- Flight Unlimited II
