= Mini Racers =

- Developer: Looking Glass Studios
- Publisher: Nintendo
- Platform: Nintendo 64
- Release: Cancelled
- Genre: Racing
- Modes: Single-player, multiplayer

Mini Racers is a cancelled racing video game for the Nintendo 64. The game, reminiscent of R.C. Pro-Am and Micro Machines, was in development by Looking Glass Studios between 1998 and 2000. Despite development reportedly being close to finished, its release was complicated by the closure of its developer, and Nintendo chose not to publish the game, leading to its cancellation. Despite never being commercially released, the game would unofficially leak onto the internet in subsequent years.

== Gameplay ==
Gameplay screenshot from a leaked beta build.

The game involves the player driving a toy car from a top-down perspective, similar to the R.C. Pro-Am and Micro Machines series of video games. The gameplay primarily entailed driving the car around a given track in efforts to complete a set number of laps - usually 8 - faster than opponents. In addition to gas and brakes, it had a "nitro boost" that allowed for greater distance in going off ramps. Other modes were also present in the game, such as ones that encourage crashing into other players. Multiplayer with up to four players was featured in the game. In addition to being able to race pre-made races courses created by the developers, the game featured two modes for new course creation as well - one being a random course generator, and the other being one where the player could design their own course.

== Development and release ==
Mini Racers was first officially announced at E3 1999. Rumors about the game were reported on by publications for over a year prior to its announcement, partially due to Nintendo's securing the rights to a website of the same name. Its name, coupled with concurrent rumors that Rare was working on a secret unannounced title, lead to speculation that Rare was developing a follow up to the R.C. Pro-Am series. While Rare had been working on an unannounced sequel — Pro-Am 64 — that game was a separate project eventually retooled into Diddy Kong Racing (1997); Mini Racers was an unrelated game in development by Looking Glass Studios. The development of the game progressed into the following year, with GameSpot reporting that the game was 90% complete as of April 2000, and scheduled for an October 2000 release in Japan. However, its release was cast into doubt the following month, when Looking Glass Studios closed down. While IGN described the game's status as "all but cancelled now", weeks later they published a follow-up report that the game could still potentially see release, as Looking Glass Studios had submitted a near-finished copy of the game just prior to their closure. Ultimately, the game was cancelled and never commercially release, though in 2006, an anonymous Craigslist user posted that he possessed a finished copy of the game, and was requesting help preserving the game, eventually leading to its unofficial release on the internet.

== Reception ==
Pre-release reception for the game was generally positive, with some concerns present. IGN felt its original concept and "addictive multiplayer" lead them to be that "it's certainly got the potential to be a hit when it debuts later this year, even in the saturated genre of 'racers', and we use this term loosely here. It's because Mini Racers isn't so much a racer as it is an arcade lap-driver that it just might succeed." They did mention that the gameplay speed felt a little too slow in the multiplayer modes. N64 Magazine was more negative on the preview builds, citing concerns with the camera system, which they felt made it to hard to see surroundings when driving. GameSpot praised its graphics, referring to them as "very impressive, with varied and interesting environments."
