= Looking Glass Studios =

American former video game developer

Looking Glass Studios, Inc.
- Formerly: Blue Sky Productions (1990–1992); LookingGlass Technologies, Inc. (1992–1997)
- Type: Private
- Industry: Video games
- Founded: 1990; 36 years ago in Salem, New Hampshire, U.S.
- Founders: Paul Neurath; Ned Lerner
- Defunct: May 24, 2000; 26 years ago
- Fate: Dissolved
- Headquarters: Cambridge, Massachusetts, U.S.
- Key people: Paul Neurath (president; 1990–2000)
- Number of employees: 120 (1999)
- Parent: AverStar (1997–1999)
- Website: www.lglass.com at the Wayback Machine (archived February 9, 1998)

Looking Glass Studios, Inc. (formerly Blue Sky Productions and LookingGlass Technologies, Inc.) was an American video game developer based in Cambridge, Massachusetts. The company was founded by Paul Neurath with Ned Lerner as Blue Sky Productions in 1990, and merged with Lerner's Lerner Research in 1992 to become LookingGlass Technologies. Between 1997 and 1999, the company was part of Intermetrics and was renamed Looking Glass Studios. Due to lasting financial issues, the studio shut down in May 2000.

Notable productions by Looking Glass include the Ultima Underworld, System Shock, and Thief series.

== History ==
=== Blue Sky Productions, Lerner Research, and Ultima Underworld (1990–1992) ===
Co-founders of Looking Glass, Paul Neurath and Ned Lerner, met at Wesleyan University where Lerner was a physics major and Neurath studied environmental science. The two worked together on the game Deep Space: Operation Copernicus (1987) before Lerner moved to the West Coast where he worked creating games for Electronic Arts. Neurath found work at Origin Systems, who had moved its business to New Hampshire in 1984. Neurath worked on a number of projects including Ogre (1986) and Omega (1989). His largest project was leading the design of Space Rogue (1989), which he collaborated with Lerner on many of the technical aspects. Space Rogue was in turn a major inspiration for Wing Commander (1990) due to its melding of storytelling and space combat elements.

Before the completion of Space Rogue, Origin Systems moved back to Texas along with the majority of the staff. Neurath, not wanting to move, decided to use the former Origin office to start his own studio, Blue Sky Productions, at 59 Stiles Road in Salem, New Hampshire in 1990. Lerner, who had his own company called Lerner Research, supplied funds to help get the operation off the ground.

With a concept to create a first-person dungeon crawler in the vein of Dungeon Master (1987), Neurath began recruiting from the local region. One of his early hires was Doug Church, programmer and graduate of the Massachusetts Institute of Technology. Church working together with Chris Green of Lerner Research developed a basic three-dimensional, texture mapped demonstration of the game with animation by former Origin artist Douglas Wike. The demo was showcased at the 1990 Summer Consumer Electronics Show to attract publisher interest. Richard Garriott and Warren Spector of Origin Systems saw the demo and decided to finance its first game.

The demo, initially named Underworld, was rebranded under the Ultima series. The initial funding for the game was purportedly $30,000, allowing Neurath to hire his initial staff into Blue Sky Productions. The final cost of production was around $400,000 and would be released in March 1992 as Ultima Underworld (1992). By the end of production on Ultima Underworld, the company had moved to a new office in Lexington, Massachusetts.

=== LookingGlass Technologies (1992-1996) ===
Blue Sky Productions began work on the sequel to Ultima Underworld while Neurath and Lerner spoke about merging their two companies. Lerner Research was fresh off the completion of Car & Driver (1992) and had been granted a license to develop EA's next Madden title for the Sega Genesis for which it needed more development support. The two decided on a name change in order to differentiate themselves from the game company Blue Sky Software. Initially it used the name "Flying Fish Designs" but eventually settled on Looking Glass. The name was chosen both as a reference to the book Through the Looking Glass by Lewis Carroll and to the idea that their game worlds transported people to new worlds. They initially considered "Looking Glass Studios" but decided that their specialty was more in technology.

LookingGlass Technologies Inc. was incorporated on June 29, 1992, with Neurath as president and Ned Lerner as vice president and treasurer. John Madden Football '93 (1992) was the first game released by the new studio, with Ultima Underworld II: Labyrinth of Worlds (1993) following. Origin became a subsidiary of Electronic Arts in September 1992; EA handled all future publishing arrangements with the studio.

The experienced development team led by Doug Church developed System Shock (1994), a pioneering combination of first-person shooter mechanics and immersive systems. The game was decently successful, but initially released on floppy disk which cut out the voiced dialog in its data entry logs, a novel narrative technique for which the game became known. The CD-ROM version utilized voice acting developed by an internal sound team, made up of members from the local band Tribe: Greg LoPiccolo, Eric Brosius, and Terri Brosius – also voice of System Shock's villain SHODAN – who later moved into a game design role.

LookingGlass moved to a new facility in Cambridge, Massachusetts in Fall 1994. They received $3.8 million of investment from venture capital firms in November of that year. In 1995, the company started publishing its own games under its own label starting with Flight Unlimited (1995). Designed by Seamus Blackley, the game was noted for its realistic physics simulation and was very successful for Looking Glass, selling 300,000 copies by mid-1997. The series was followed up by several sequels.

Terra Nova: Strike Force Centauri (1996) was a large multimedia production by the studio. The full-motion cutscenes were shot inside of the Looking Glass offices on a greenscreen, with staff members doubling as actors and producers of the film. The game featured other technological achievements like procedural animation, but the massive production took its toll on Looking Glass, not recouping its production costs.

=== Looking Glass Studios (1997-2000) ===
Due in part to the failure of Terra Nova and British Open Championship Golf (1997), Neurath sought outside investment to keep the company afloat. Intermetrics, a Massachusetts-based software company, acquired LookingGlass in 1997. The official name of the company was changed to Intermetrics Entertainment Software, LLC, operating under the trade name of Looking Glass Studios.

The Intermetrics buyout preceded a number of departures at the studio. Co-founder Ned Lerner left to form Multitude with Looking Glass programmer Art Min. Most famously, designer Ken Levine, artist Rob Fermier, and programmer Jonathan Chey who had worked together on a Star Trek: Voyager game canceled in production formed Irrational Games. Irrational formed a studio initially based in the Looking Glass offices, where it co-developed System Shock 2 (1999) and the canceled Deep Cover before becoming fully independent.

During the production of Thief: The Dark Project (1998), Looking Glass hired Warren Spector away from Origin Systems to staff a development arm of the company in Austin, Texas first opened in 1995. Though Spector left soon afterwards to join Ion Storm, the Texas office remained open to create console games for various publishers. They created a port of Command & Conquer for the Nintendo 64, Destruction Derby 64 (1999), along with canceled projects Tamiya Racing and Mini Racers.

The lack of success for Looking Glass' projects continued to exert pressure on the studio, in addition to its difficulties finding publishers. Eidos Interactive published Flight Unlimited II (1997) and both Thief games, Electronic Arts published System Shock 2 and Flight Unlimited III (1999). In 1999, Intermetrics divested its ownership of Looking Glass, leaving it without any financial support. The following year, several publishing deals with Eidos, Sony, and Microsoft fell apart.

On May 24, 2000, Neurath called a meeting attended by all employees. He announced that the studio was closing down and the staff left the building that day, with public announcements following. Irrational Games continued work on Deep Cover until its subsequent cancellation; many former Looking Glass staff like Terri Brosius joined them. Development on Thief III was handed to a team led by Thief II project lead Steve Pearsall until it was canceled. A Flight Unlimited spin-off, Flight Combat, which was an estimated three months from completion, was handed to Mad Doc Software to be completed as Jane's Attack Squadron (2002) as the final game with credits by Looking Glass Studios.

=== Financial difficulties ===
During the late 1990s, financial strain increased for Looking Glass Studios due to costly development projects and funding loss. Countless projects were in need of resources but did not generate sufficient revenue. Looking Glass studio heavily depended on outside sources and external publishers for funding. After the release of Thief II: The Metal Age, funding was withdrawn, leaving the company without reliable financial support. The shut down of the studio resulted from a multiple elements, not one single flop. This included failed business negotiations, the cancellation of future planned projects, and difficulty securing new investments.

May 24, 2000, Looking Glass studios ceased operations and laid off its remaining staff, around 60 employees. After a decade of developmental activities and famous releases, the company was brought to an end. The video game industry is characterized by high developmental costs creating financial instability for individual studios as the market expands.This volatility has contributed to the closure of numerous studios following unsuccessful projects or due to the loss of publishing support.

=== Legacy ===
Looking Glass Studios has been called one of the most important development studios in the history of video games. Their game catalog including the Ultima Underworld, System Shock, and Thief series are seen as the foundation for the immersive sim genre of action games. Games like The Elder Scrolls: Arena, Deus Ex, and Dishonored are explicitly modeled after Looking Glass' catalog. The latter two feature designers who were formerly members of Looking Glass.

Ultima Underworld was an influence on id Software's move to create visually impressive first person shooters. John Romero, who had worked on Space Rogue, conversed with Paul Neurath about the texture mapping technology used in the early Underworld demo. He spoke about this to John Carmack, who implemented the technique into Catacomb 3-D (1991). This technology was crucial to the creation of Wolfenstein 3D (1992) and Doom (1993).

Many other of Looking Glass' developers went on to work on important AAA games. Ned Lerner joined Sony Worldwide Studios as Director of Engineering where he worked on games through the PlayStation 3 and PlayStation 4. Seamus Blackley and other Looking Glass cohorts left to join DreamWorks Interactive, working on the innovative Trespasser (1998). AI programmer on Thief: The Dark Project Tom Leonard joined Valve Corporation where he developed the AI for Source projects including Half-Life 2. Doug Church went on to work for Ion Storm, Electronic Arts, and eventually Valve. Greg LoPiccolo and Eric Brosius joined Harmonix where they played a major role in the development of the Guitar Hero and Rock Band franchises.

Following the closure of Looking Glass, Paul Neurath founded Floodgate Entertainment in Boston, Massachusetts. They ported Ultima Underworld to mobile platforms as well as worked on titles like Dark Messiah of Might and Magic. Floodgate was later acquired by Zynga and merged into the Zynga Boston studio; Neurath became the creative director. After the closure of Zynga Boston in October 2012, Neurath established Otherside Entertainment in 2013. He reassembled many Looking Glass employees to work on a spiritual successor of Ultima Underworld, Underworld Ascendant (2018), initially funded through Kickstarter.

The rights to Looking Glass' catalog were initially split between various rights holders, which made re-releases of its catalog difficult. Eidos retained the rights to the Thief franchise. Thief: Deadly Shadows (2004) was created by Ion Storm and the reboot Thief (2014) was created by Eidos-Montréal. Stephen Kick of Nightdive Studios secured the rights to re-release the System Shock games and eventually acquired the IP rights to create a remake, System Shock (2023), and a future sequel.

== Games developed ==
=== By Lerner Research ===
Year	Title	Publisher
1987	Chuck Yeager's Advanced Flight Trainer	Electronic Arts
1991	F-22 Interceptor	Electronic Arts
1992	Car and Driver	Electronic Arts

=== By Blue Sky Productions ===
Year	Title	Publisher
1992	Ultima Underworld: The Stygian Abyss	Origin Systems

=== As LookingGlass Technologies (post-merger) ===
Year	Title	Publisher	Notes
1992	John Madden Football '93	EA Sports	Sega Genesis version
1993	Ultima Underworld II: Labyrinth of Worlds	Origin Systems/Electronic Arts	
1994	System Shock	Origin Systems	
1995	Flight Unlimited	LookingGlass Technologies	
1996	Terra Nova: Strike Force Centauri	LookingGlass Technologies	
1997	British Open Championship Golf	LookingGlass Technologies	

=== As Looking Glass Studios (rename) ===
Year	Title	Publisher	Notes
1997	Flight Unlimited II	Eidos Interactive	
1998	Thief: The Dark Project	Eidos Interactive	
1999	Command & Conquer	Nintendo	Nintendo 64 port
1999	System Shock 2	Electronic Arts	Co-developed with Irrational Games
1999	Flight Unlimited III	Electronic Arts	
1999	Destruction Derby 64	THQ	
2000	Thief II	Eidos Interactive	
2002	Jane's Attack Squadron	Xicat Interactive	Originally cancelled, finished by Mad Doc Software
