= Trespasser (video game) =

1998 action-adventure video game

- Developer: DreamWorks Interactive
- Publisher: Electronic Arts
- Producer: Seamus Blackley
- Designer: Austin Grossman
- Programmers: Andrew Grant; Mark Langerak
- Artists: Terry Izumi; Kyle McKisic; Philip Salas
- Composer: Bill Brown
- Series: Jurassic Park
- Platform: Windows
- Release: NA: October 27, 1998
- Genres: Action-adventure, first-person shooter
- Mode: Single-player

Trespasser is a 1998 action-adventure video game developed by DreamWorks Interactive and published by Electronic Arts for Microsoft Windows. The game serves as a sequel to the 1997 film The Lost World: Jurassic Park, taking place a year after the film's events. Players control Anne, the sole survivor of a plane crash that leaves her stranded on a remote island with genetically engineered dinosaurs. It features the voices of Minnie Driver as Anne and Richard Attenborough as John Hammond, reprising his role from the film series.

The game engine of Trespasser was advanced for its time and required a fast and powerful computer to adequately display the game's detailed graphics without pixelation artifacts. Upon release, the game received mixed to negative reviews and disappointed many critics, with GameSpot declaring it "the worst game of 1998". The mixed reception is believed to have been caused by rushing the development to reach the 1998 release date and the game's overly ambitious and advanced nature.

== Plot ==
John Hammond, a rich industrialist, used his wealth to assemble a scientific team that cloned dinosaurs. An amusement park showcasing his biological attractions fails when the dinosaurs escape. While Jurassic Park was built on Isla Nublar, off the coast of Costa Rica, the animals were raised at an alternate location, Isla Sorna, also named Site B. Trespasser takes place a year after the events of The Lost World: Jurassic Park, where the general public learned about the existence of Jurassic Park.

The player controls Anne, whose plane has crashed on the way to Costa Rica. Anne awakens on the shores of an island, apparently the sole survivor of the crash, and proceeds to explore. Anne learns she is on Site B. Pursued by dinosaurs, Anne makes use of weapons left behind to defend herself. She follows a monorail track into the island interior. After recovering security cards from an InGen town and rebooting a computer to activate a mountain-top radio tower, Anne proceeds to the large mountain and ascends. At the summit, Anne contacts the United States Navy on an emergency channel. After defeating the Alpha Velociraptor and its tribe that lives atop the mountain, she is rescued by helicopter. Anne returns to her apartment and listens to her messages, including one from her friend asking where Anne has been and saying she had better have "a real good excuse"; Anne reacts by tossing a velociraptor claw onto the table.

== Gameplay ==
The entire game is played through the eyes of Anne (voiced by Driver). There are only three cutscenes: one that begins the game and one that concludes the game, and an introductory video. There is occasional orchestral music, scored by Bill Brown. As she traverses the island, Anne will often talk to herself or remember clips of John Hammond's memoirs (voiced by Richard Attenborough) describing the creation (and downfall) of Jurassic Park. There are no time limits or difficulty settings to adjust and only the first level has text prompts to aid players that are new to the game.

Screenshot showing a Triceratops

This game features no HUD. Anne's health is represented by a heart-shaped tattoo on her breast that the player can look down to. The ink of the tattoo is filled in depending on the amount of damage she has taken; when it is filled completely and a chain appears around it, Anne dies. Anne's health regenerates quickly over time as long as she does not take further damage. To track weapon ammunition without a HUD, players must rely on Anne verbally describing weapons she picks up, and she weighs the weapon in her hand and says phrases like "About eight shots", "Feels full" and "Hasn't been used", along with verbally counting down ammunition as she fires a weapon.

By pressing a key, Anne will extend her arm out into the game world, allowing the player to pick up, swing, push and throw objects. This allows the player to create improvised weaponry, for instance: picking up a large rock off the ground and hitting an enemy with it. Anne can move her arm in any direction, allowing the player to get a different feel of use for each weapon. Anne can only carry two items at once and when bumping into things will often drop items.

In addition to picking objects off the ground to use as weapons, Anne can find and use various other armaments including key cards and diskettes. In situations requiring button input (such as keypads), Anne will extend one of her fingers. In keeping with the "hyper realistic" vision of the game, firearms have no cross-hairs. The player aligns the gun by adjusting Anne's wrist and then manually moving her arm to aim. Anne can carry up to two weapons at a time. Weapons have been made to incorporate realistic recoil, as if being held with two hands. Once each firearm is empty, it can be used as a club when swung. Empty weapons cannot be reloaded. All weapons must be discarded at the end of each level. Hints and keypad codes appear in unexpected places on walls, often in a level or two before they are needed.

== Development ==
The game was initiated by two former employees of Looking Glass Technologies, Seamus Blackley and Austin Grossman. With the film The Lost World: Jurassic Park expected to be a success and after securing the movie license, the pair approached several movie animation groups before signing with DreamWorks Interactive. Adobe Photoshop 5 and 3D Studio Max were used to produce the game. A 3D model of the island was built and digitally scanned to construct the game environment. John Williams was contracted to compose music exclusively for the game.

Trespasser went severely over-budget several times throughout its development. Originally, the game was to be released in the fall of 1997. However, due to a number of problems and how advanced the game was becoming, the project was delayed by a year. The rush to release the game caused many features to either be cut, or left unfinished and unpolished. Anne's left arm was removed from the game due to difficulties coding the behaviour of both arms together. A late shift in development effectively changed the game's genre from survival horror to action shooter, resulting in many complaints upon release. Additional problems were caused by the lack of experienced management and the use of artists who were unfamiliar with basic game development processes and 3D modeling. Art director Terry Izumi, for example, previously worked as a designer for Tomorrowland, and George Edwards was a veteran animator of Disney films.

After developing for over two years, DreamWorks Interactive informed the development team in April 1998 that as part of a deal with AMD, Trespasser would need to release in October of that year even though Blackley estimated Trespasser needed at least another year of development to be release-ready. The team rushed the remainder of development, and Trespasser released as an unfinished game set in a very large and open outdoor environment. These issues were also caused by the game development starting before the 3dfx Voodoo 1 moved towards 3D hardware. As a result, some techniques, including bump mapping and image caching, were incompatible with graphics processing units. Near the end of development the programmers developed a renderer that drew bump mapped objects in software and the terrain in hardware, but most objects were bump mapped so the speed advantages of hardware acceleration were negated. Trespasser used many textures for its mip levels and image cache, more than the most highly lauded gaming card of the time, the Voodoo2, could handle, and the game used the lower resolution textures in hardware mode instead of the high resolution ones available in software mode. This resulted in the game running faster and in some ways looking better in software mode, while running in hardware mode meant the game ran slower and had more blurry looking textures.

The Trespasser engine contained several features not normally seen in game engines at the time. In 1998, it was one of the first engines to successfully portray outdoor environments full of hundreds of trees. It accomplished this by rendering terrain to an offscreen cache and then only redrawing objects when the player character moves significantly. Computers in 1998 could not render the complex environments it generated. The terrain modeler was created by Mark Langerak, formerly head of development at Sega Europe. In addition, the Trespasser engine featured the first game world to be completely influenced by classical mechanics and was also the first game to use ragdoll physics. One of the most advanced features of the rendering engine was the ability to render objects like trees and rocks as 2D sprites, which, when close enough to Anne, would be replaced by their 3D counterpart. Elements using this technique are known as "impostors". This often led to an ugly "popping" where a low-resolution object suddenly "pops" into 3D.

Trespasser features a robust physics system, but instead of accurate, per-polygon collisions, Trespasser uses a "Box System" where every object in the game acts as if it is encased in an invisible box. Additionally, Trespasser's physics are based on the Penalty Force Method, in which, when two objects collide, rather than stopping movement the two objects push away from one another until they are no longer colliding. In the final release the dinosaurs were disallowed from making jump attacks and entering buildings to avoid interpenetration, a glitch where two objects will collide and then become stuck inside one another.

Andrew Grant was Trespasser's chief artificial intelligence programmer. Every animation in Trespasser is done using inverse kinematics. No animation in the game is pre-animated; every movement of every dinosaur is generated automatically through their artificial intelligence. Due to the rushed nature of development, this feature resulted in awkward movement as the dinosaurs performed unnaturally. Trespasser was designed to have a complex artificial intelligence routine, giving each creature on the island its own set of emotions and the possibility of dinosaurs fighting each other. Dinosaurs would react to the player differently depending on what mood they were in. However, system bugs in the artificial intelligence routines made it so that dinosaurs would switch between mood-based actions so quickly that they would stop moving and acting. A quick fix was hard-coded into the game that maximized the anger and hunger emotions of carnivorous dinosaurs and left all other emotions at zero.

== Reception ==
Reception

Aggregate score
Aggregator	Score
GameRankings	57%

Review scores
Publication	Score
AllGame	4/5
Computer and Video Games	1/5 (magazine); 1/10 (website)
Edge	2/10
Game Informer	6.5/10
GamePro	4/5
GameRevolution	B−
GameSpot	3.9/10
IGN	4.7/10
Next Generation	2/5
PC Accelerator	5/10
PC Gamer (US)	62%
PC Zone	70%
The Cincinnati Enquirer	3/4

Before the release of the game, it was announced that Trespasser would revolutionize PC gaming. However, reviews after release were mostly negative. Trespasser was a critical and commercial failure, selling about 50,000 copies. Many reviewers disliked the poor graphics performance on even the fastest graphically accelerated PCs available upon the game's release, but some praised the title's originality and scale. Despite the anticipation over the many "first attempts at" within the game's original development scope, the reality did not match the hype.

Next Generation rated it two stars out of five, and stated that "the dinosaurs are amazing looking and have great AI. There are even times when you can see how, with a fast enough processor, this could have been fun. In the end, though, it's clear that Trespasser had a reach that exceeded its grasp."

Alex Huhtala of Computer and Video Games gave the game a score of 1 out of 5, criticising the "technically impressive" in-game physics for making simple actions frustrating to perform, and concluding "Trespasser is possibly the worst game I've ever played." A review by Kim Randell published on the Computer and Video Games website in 2001 called the game "a dog's dinner" and gave it a score of 1 out of 10. It described elements of the physics engine, such as Anne's difficulty holding onto items without dropping them, as wholly unrealistic. A GameSpot review by Elliot Chin described it as the most frustrating game he had ever played with "boring gameplay and annoying bugs". He lambasted the needlessly complicated physics engine, levels being over-filled with box-stacking puzzles, and a clumsy arm interface. One reviewer said it had the worst clipping he had ever seen with another reviewer finding the game experienced slowdown and frame rate drops. Other complaints included exploration being tiresome due to slow movement speed, landscapes being barren with few dinosaurs, graphical glitches, and poor voice acting.

An IGN review was more favourable, describing the plot as "super-intriguing" with high praise for the realism of the game's physics engine. While deriding the blocky and heavily pixelated environment that offered limited interaction, and the erratic and impossible arm movements, the reviewer said the dinosaurs were convincing and "looked and moved really well" and concluded the game was badly implemented but still ground-breaking. Game Revolution described the game's graphical engine as gorgeous with impressive real-time shadows and good water and particle physics. On the downside, it said the gameplay is very basic with the usual "key-finding, enemy-killing, button-pushing" of the FPS genre, and that when there was more than one dinosaur on-screen the game slowed considerably. An AllGame reviewer didn't like the bugs and graphical glitches or the slow frame rate but concluded the game was a "ground breaking title that offers some great thrills, challenges, puzzles, and rewarding gameplay". PC Gamer UK thought the game got the atmospherics right. PC Zone felt the game could be quite frightening but that there were too many guns scattered around the island. An Adrenaline Vault review liked the game's originality and some tense moments, but disliked the slow treks, the lack of a real inventory system, the frustrating interface and there being too many guns lying around. He found the arm manipulation cumbersome and frustrating during the heat of battle, as it requires up to five buttons to be pressed.

Computer Gaming World awarded the game "Coaster of the Year". GameSpot included Trespasser as one of nominees for the title of the Most Disappointing Game of the Year ("losing" to Star Wars Rebellion) and awarded it the Worst Game of the Year (PC), commenting: "Of all the games released this year, none was as ill-received and terrible as Trespasser. No game was implemented as poorly, and no game squandered its potential as much. No game played as awfully. (...) There's one thing we won't forget: Trespasser was undoubtedly the worst game of 1998."

== Fan community ==
Although Trespasser was a critical and commercial failure, substantial amateur interest in the game persisted for years, coalescing into online fan communities such as the Trespasser Hacking Society and Trespasser Secrets, both now defunct, and TresCom, which remains active as of 2025. Members of these communities developed fan-made software to examine, preview, and eventually edit Trespasser, such as the TresEd level editor. The fan community was also able to acquire the original source code to create modifications and unofficial patches. For example, Trespasser CE allows players to play the original Trespasser game at higher resolutions and frame rates without experiencing crashes. In 2014, based on this available source code, a code review was done by Fabien Sanglard which revealed several design aspects of the game.

== Legacy ==
Despite lackluster reviews, Trespasser went on to influence game developers who were interested in the game's ideas and flawed but innovative mechanics. The game's unique control scheme inspired at least two indie titles, Surgeon Simulator 2013 and the original Octodad, whose developers have referred to Trespasser as a source of inspiration. Trespasser's outdoor level design also partly inspired the use of outdoor environments in level design for FPS games such as Halo: Combat Evolved and the Far Cry series. Id Software cofounder John Carmack also cited Trespasser's use of voiceover narration for storytelling as one inspiration for Doom 3 eschewing cutscenes in favor of audio logs for its storytelling.

Despite its failures, Trespasser is generally recognized as the first game to incorporate a full physics engine. Gabe Newell cited Trespasser as influential to Half-Life 2's physics, though its failure caused him and the rest of Valve to worry about the potential for negative comparisons between the two. In September 2019, Trespasser was spotlighted in the 172nd episode of the webseries Angry Video Game Nerd, with Seamus Blackley making a guest appearance to discuss the game's development.

Around 2012, as Steven Spielberg was preparing to revive the Jurassic Park franchise, he contacted Blackley about making a new Trespasser game. Blackley developed a concept titled Jurassic World, in which the dinosaurs from Isla Sorna escaped and forced humans to reevaluate their place in the world. The game would focus on Billy Brennan, a character in the 2001 film Jurassic Park III. Having been hired to prevent further escapes, Brennan would travel to the island and eventually become allies with a pack of raptors. Due to a management change at Universal Pictures, the project was cancelled and Blackley turned the assets over to Frank Marshall, who produced the 2015 film Jurassic World.

== See also ==
- Jurassic Park video games
