= Seamus Blackley =

American video game designer

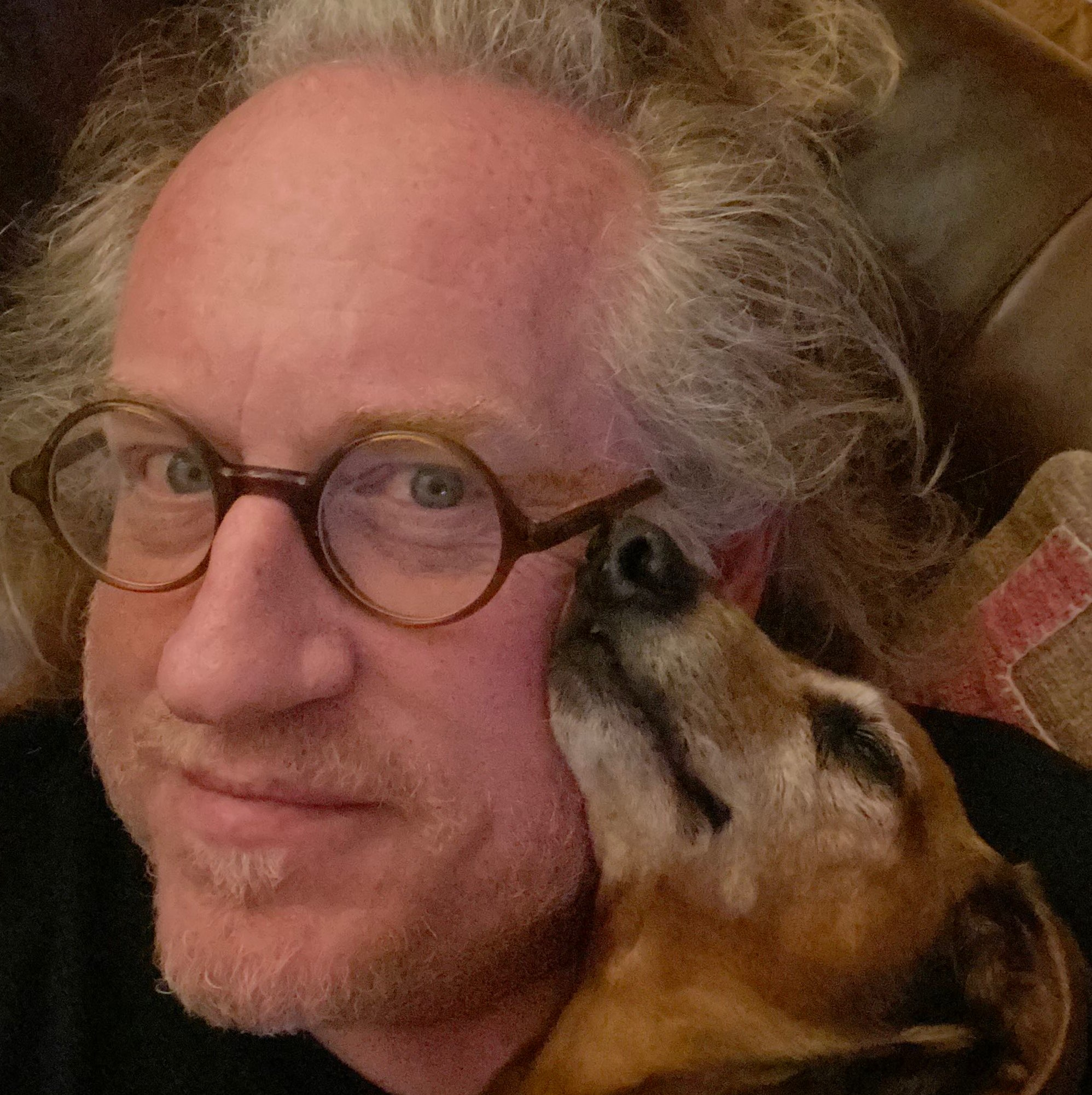
- Blackley and (pet) Charles in 2021
- Born: Jonathan Blackley; 1968 (age 57–58)
- Education: Tufts University
- Occupations: Video game designer, agent
- Years active: 1990–present
- Known for: Flight Unlimited, Trespasser, Xbox
- Spouse: Caroline Quinn

Jonathan "Seamus" Blackley (born 1968) is an American video game designer and former agent with Creative Artists Agency representing video game creators. He is best known for creating and designing the original Xbox in 2001.

== Career ==
After entering Tufts University to study electrical engineering, Blackley switched to study physics and graduated in 1990, Summa cum Honore en Tesis. As an undergraduate, he published his first paper in the Journal of Magnetic Resonance. After college, he studied high energy physics at the Fermi National Accelerator Laboratory, until the Superconducting Supercollider project was cancelled in 1993.

Blackley then went to work at Blue Sky Productions, later called Looking Glass Studios. In addition to his work on Ultima Underworld and System Shock, Blackley helped to create the sophisticated physics system in Flight Unlimited. He is mentioned in the Flight Unlimited manual as follows:

As far back as 1992, we started looking for new ways to fly on the PC. Seamus Blackley, a physics expert and experienced pilot, had just been hired on at Looking Glass Technologies, and he was well placed to see where the current simulators fell short of what they could be.

Following the completion of Flight Unlimited in 1995, Blackley planned to use that game's computational fluid dynamics (CFDs) code to create a combat flight simulator called Flight Combat. However, a new manager at Looking Glass Studios demanded that Blackley instead design a direct sequel to Flight Unlimited as to directly compete with Microsoft Flight Simulator. Blackley refused and was fired, leaving the company in late 1995.

After Looking Glass, Blackley worked at DreamWorks Interactive as executive producer of Jurassic Park: Trespasser, a video game sequel to the film The Lost World: Jurassic Park. Trespasser was designed to use a physics-rich game engine for much of the animation for the game. The game was to have been shipped by late 1997 as part of a deal that Dreamworks had made with a computer chip manufacturer, but the game was only partially completed; the chip deal fell through, and the budget for the game was significantly cut. Though the title was eventually published in 1998, its failure became renowned, and Blackley took full responsibility for its faults.

During press events for Trespasser, Blackley had met Bill Gates, then the CEO of Microsoft. Gates had been impressed with the technical achievements of Trespasser, and he helped Blackley to secure a job at Microsoft in February 1999 as program manager for Entertainment Graphics, initially working on DirectX. During 1999, Sony introduced the PlayStation 2, which they marketed as a platform for the living room that would outdo Microsoft Windows and Linux. Blackley said that this announcement raised concerns within Microsoft of how they could challenge Sony. Blackley had already recognized that part of Microsoft's problems for gaming support was the vast number of possible configurations they had to deal with, and their attempts with technologies like DirectX to standardize these. While on a flight from Boston back to Seattle after visiting his girlfriend, Blackley came up with the idea of having Microsoft design its own console, with standardized hardware, and able to tap into a larger pool of hardware resources due to the company's influence as to beat Sony at its own game. This led to the initial Xbox proposal, which Gates eventually approved, and helped assemble the team that designed and built the device. He then promoted the Xbox to game developers around the world.

Blackley left Microsoft in 2002 to co-found Capital Entertainment Group with former Microsoft co-worker Kevin Bachus after his time developing the Xbox. CEG aimed to reform the financing models available in the game industry, following the Hollywood studio model, to provide more flexibility and creative control to game makers, and loosen the grip publishers had on control of the game industry. CEG was unable to complete a game before folding in 2003. In 2007, Blackley received the P.T. Barnum Award from Tufts University for his exceptional work in the field of media and entertainment.

From 2003 through May 2011, Blackley represented video game developers at the Creative Artists Agency, evolving the position of video games within the entertainment industry. In February 2012, Blackley cofounded Innovative Leisure in order to recruit game programmers from the Golden age of arcade video games to write mobile games. In 2017 Blackley took a post running the research and development team for the augmented reality startup Daqri to explore methods of producing more powerful holograms and in 2018 became the CEO of tech startup Pacific Light and Hologram.

In 2019, Blackley appeared as himself on the 172nd episode of the webseries Angry Video Game Nerd, answering questions regarding development of the video game Trespasser.

During the COVID-19 pandemic, Blackley gained attention for instructional Twitter threads on baking sourdough bread using ancient yeast and historical baking methods.
