= British Open Championship Golf =

1997 video game

- Developer: LookingGlass Technologies
- Publisher: LookingGlass Technologies
- Director: Rex E. Bradford
- Designers: Rex E. Bradford; Ben Hansford; Steven W. Nadeau
- Programmer: Tony Tomc
- Artist: Gayle Robertson
- Composer: Eric Brosius
- Platform: Windows 95
- Release: NA: April 21, 1997
- Genre: Golf sports game
- Mode: Single-player

British Open Championship Golf is a 1997 sports video game developed and published by LookingGlass Technologies. A simulation of The Open Championship, it allows the player to engage in multiple forms of golf, including stroke play and fourball. The player competes at reproductions of the Royal Troon Golf Club and the Old Course at St. Andrews as and against famous golfers of the time. Announcer commentary is provided by actor Michael Bradshaw and Wide World of Sports host Jim McKay.

British Open Championship Golf was the third self-published game released by Looking Glass Technologies. It was directed by Rex Bradford, designer of the early golf title Mean 18. The team sought to create an accurate simulation of tournament golf play, which they felt was missing in the genre. To achieve this goal, they focused on recreating the atmosphere of a tournament, and included reactive crowds and announcers. The game was placed in competition with popular golf series such as Links and PGA Tour.

The game was a major commercial failure, and Looking Glass ceased its self-publishing operations after its release. Despite this, it was generally well reviewed by critics, who praised Jim McKay's commentary and the game's graphics and atmosphere. Criticism was leveled against its lack of multiplayer or course creation functionality, and some reviewers found fault with its brevity.

== Gameplay ==
The player, as Sandy Lyle, prepares to shoot for the first hole on the Old Course at St. Andrews. The semi-circular "swing meter" curves around the golfer.

British Open Championship Golf is a three-dimensional (3D) video game that simulates golf, a sport in which players attempt to hit a ball into a hole with as few strokes as possible. In particular, the game is based on The Open Championship, the oldest tournament in golf. The player may compete as a pre- or self-created amateur golfer or as one of eight celebrity athletes, including Sandy Lyle, Vijay Singh and Ian Baker-Finch. Three modes of play—Practice, Match and Tournament—are available. Practice and Match are non-binding preparatory modes: the former allows the player to practice each hole of a course, and the latter engages the player in a pre-tournament match of stroke play, match play or fourball. In the Tournament mode, the player competes in The Open Championship, which consists of four 18-hole matches.

Before making a shot, the player may select a club and adjust the general direction of the swing. As with other golf games, a "swing meter" is used to simulate the act of swinging the club. The player clicks three times: first to initiate the backswing, which causes a timing indicator to move along the meter; second to begin the downswing; and third to "snap" the shot, which determines accuracy. Changes in the timing of these clicks alter the shot. A red section on the far end of the swing meter represents overswinging, which negatively affects shots. The crowd reacts to the player's shots, and Tournament mode features announcer commentary that analyzes the match overall; it can frame the player's current performance in the light of past shots.

The player may choose one of two courses: the Royal Troon Golf Club and the Old Course at St. Andrews. The player's caddie provides information about the pitfalls and idiosyncrasies of each course. The game simulates the strong wind and weather typical of the courses' real-world counterparts, which lie near the seaside. The player may adjust environmental aspects such as weather, wind speed and the wetness of the soil. During a match, the player uses information on the heads-up display to determine such factors as wind speed and direction, the ball's distance from the flag and the height difference between the ball and the hole.

== Development ==
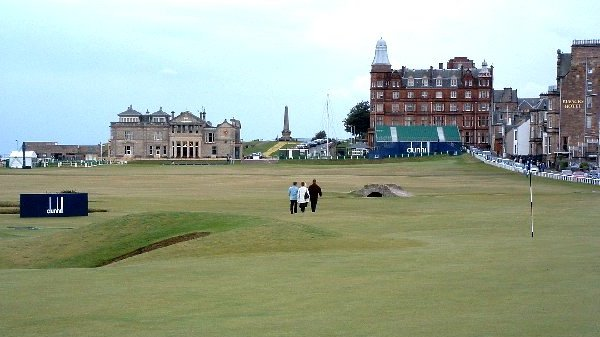
The Old Course at St. Andrews—the oldest golf course in the world—had never before been authorized for reproduction in a video game.

Looking Glass Technologies began developing British Open Championship Golf in 1995. The project was led by Rex Bradford, designer of the influential 1986 golf title Mean 18. He had also worked on earlier Looking Glass games, such as Terra Nova: Strike Force Centauri. Bradford decided to revisit the golf genre because he felt that other games did not recreate the structure or capture the atmosphere of golf tournaments; he complained that golf titles took place on "The Lonely Planet of Golf". The team sought to fill this perceived void by more accurately simulating the tournament experience, with a particular focus on crowds, commentary, atmosphere and the caddie. Bradford believed that these elements recreated "the television-style ambiance of being in that moment." Graphically, a focus was placed on buildings and animated objects, in order to make up for the less spectacular nature of links courses. The game's environments were generated with the same stereophotogrammetry techniques used to create the landscapes in the company's earlier Flight Unlimited. The team's reproduction of the Old Course at St. Andrews was the first ever authorized for a video game.

Looking Glass officially announced British Open Championship Golf on July 18, 1996. Coinciding with this news, the company launched a website to cover The Open Championship of 1996; it detailed both current events and the history of the tournament and its courses. According to Bradford, the company was "hoping to make a splash" with the game, which was placed in competition with popular series such as Links and PGA Tour. He noted the quality of these titles, and stated that, had the team not been trying to innovate, they would not have attempted to compete in the genre. Looking Glass revealed in November 1996 that Jim McKay, host of the Wide World of Sports, would provide color commentary for the game. Actor Michael Bradshaw was hired as the play-by-play announcer. The pair recorded more than 5,000 lines of dialogue in total. In January 1997, Looking Glass and Eidos Interactive announced a four-year partnership. As a result, British Open Championship Golf was distributed and marketed in North America and published in Europe by Eidos. However, like Flight Unlimited and Terra Nova, the game was self-published in North America by Looking Glass. In March 1997, near the end of the game's development, part of the team moved to Thief: The Dark Project; this included Mark Lizotte, who became that game's lead artist. British Open Championship Golf was released on April 30, 1997. That May, Looking Glass collaborated with golf website GolfWeb to host a "Virtual British Open" tournament. Players competed in the game to win a trip to The Open Championship in Scotland, complete with "air fare, hotel accommodations and spending money."

== Reception ==
Reception

Review scores
Publication	Score
Computer Gaming World	3.5/5
PC Gamer (US)	88%
Computer Games Magazine	3/5
PC Magazine	3/5

British Open Championship Golf was a commercial failure. Following its release, Looking Glass ceased self-publishing operations and closed a division of the company, laying off a group of employees that included Warren Spector. Writing for Maximum PC, T. Liam McDonald called the game "a costly bomb that bled the company." Looking Glass employee Tim Stellmach later characterized it as "a disaster". However, it was generally well received by critics. A reviewer for Next Generation Magazine hailed it as "one of the best golf games in years", praising the atmosphere and calling the graphics "among the best ... around." The writer cited the game's lack of a course editor as its main downside, and summarized, "If you are looking for a golf simulation, this one delivers." PC Magazine's Shane Mooney highlighted its "outstanding graphics" and detailed course reproductions, and noted that it "[immerses] players in a realistic tournament atmosphere." The writer considered the inclusion of only two courses to be the game's "one major drawback".

Jeff Guinn of the Fort Worth Star-Telegram called its graphics "exceptional", and considered the game to be "far from the traditional aim/swing links pseudo-challenge." However, he found the game extremely difficult, thanks to its faithful reproductions of the challenging Old Course and Royal Troon. As a result, he considered the game to be ultimately "too much of a good thing." A writer for the Telegraph-Herald praised its courses, and stated that its gameplay was a "state-of-the-art simulation". The reviewer believed that the tournament atmosphere had been "re-created faithfully." Gary Whitta of PC Gamer US praised the game's graphics and atmosphere. While he liked its gameplay, he noted that it lacked the genre refinements seen in Links LS, a decision he believed would appeal to genre novices but not to veterans. He disliked Michael Bradshaw's commentary, but praised Jim McKay's for "adding much to the overall feel." Ending his review, Whitta summarized it as "one of the most user-friendly, accessible, atmospheric and attractive golf games out there".

Peter Smith of Computer Games Magazine found the game's swinging mechanics challenging, and noted that "making a dead-on accurate shot much more difficult than in any of the other golf games out there." He found the mechanics of the putting green to be badly designed, which he cited as "an incredibly serious flaw that takes British Open Championship Golf out of contention for the gold cup." Ultimately, he recommended Links LS and Jack Nicklaus 4 over the game, but suggested that future installments or patches might fix the issues. Computer Gaming World's Scott A. May wrote that "the game is solid, but ... somewhat unspectacular" compared to Jack Nicklaus 4 and Links LS. He stated that the links courses gave the game "a somewhat desolate look and feel", and that, "Historic or not, the scenery is downright dull". The reviewer considered Jim McKay's commentary and the simulated physics to be the game's high points, and he believed that, "More so than any other golf sim, the reactive crowd and interactive caddie are ... totally integrated into play." He summarized the game as "a very good simulation" that was somewhat deflated by its lack of multiplayer, course editing and match replays.
