= Terra Nova: Strike Force Centauri =

1996 video game

- Developer: LookingGlass Technologies
- Publisher: LookingGlass Technologies
- Director: Dan Schmidt
- Designer: Dorian Hart
- Programmer: Art Min
- Artist: Rich Sullivan
- Writers: David Albert; Bill Doyle
- Composers: Eric Brosius; Terri Brosius
- Platform: MS-DOS
- Release: March 5, 1996
- Genre: Tactical first-person shooter
- Mode: Single-player

Terra Nova: Strike Force Centauri is a tactical first-person shooter developed and published by LookingGlass Technologies. It was released in 1996 for MS-DOS Set in a depiction of the 24th century, the game follows a faction of humans who colonize the Alpha Centauri star system to escape from the Hegemony, a totalitarian Earth government. The player assumes the role of Nikola ap Io, the leader of an Alpha Centauri military unit, and undertakes missions against pirates and the Hegemony.

Terra Nova has been cited as one of the first squad-oriented games with three-dimensional (3D) graphics; the player is often assisted by artificially intelligent teammates who may be given tactical commands. Conceived by Looking Glass after the completion of their first game, Ultima Underworld: The Stygian Abyss, Terra Nova had a long and difficult development process, caused in part by the production of its full-motion video cutscenes. The game's TED engine can render 3D outdoor environments and simulate physics and supports procedural animation.

Terra Nova's critical reception was highly positive. Reviewers praised its tactical elements, and several compared it to the 1995 video game MechWarrior 2: 31st Century Combat. Reception of its graphics was mixed, and many noted the game's steep system requirements. Despite critical acclaim and sales in excess of 100,000 units, the game did not recoup its development costs. It was intended to be the first in a series, but the company cancelled plans for a sequel.

== Gameplay ==
The player and two squadmates engage two enemies near a lake. The left "Multi-Function Display" shows squad-related information, while the middle contains a map, and the right depicts weapons, suit status and Auxiliary Suit Functions.

As a tactical first-person shooter, Terra Nova focuses on combat and takes place from a character's eye view in a three-dimensional (3D) graphical environment. The protagonist wears powered battle armor (PBA) that features lock-on targeting, jumpjets for limited flight, infrared and zoomed vision, and a rechargeable energy shield that protects against attacks. The player uses a freely movable mouse cursor to aim weapons and manipulate the heads-up display (HUD) interface. As with Looking Glass Technologies' earlier game System Shock, the HUD contains three "Multi-Function Displays" (MFDs). These screens may be configured to display tactical information, such as squad command menus, maps and weapon statistics.

The player is usually accompanied by up to three artificially intelligent squadmates, who may be given tactical orders such as holding a position, taking cover or rushing enemies. Squadmates may be commanded as a group or individually; for example, one half of a squad may be used to distract enemies while the other half attacks an objective. Each squad member specializes in weapons, reconnaissance, repairs, demolitions or electronics. Those in the latter four categories may be given special commands, such as repairing a teammate's armor or setting explosive charges. During missions, squad members radio in enemy sightings and status assessments.

The game takes place in 37 missions. Each begins with a briefing that describes such details as objectives, squad size and enemies. Objectives range from rescues and assaults to reconnaissance photography. Additional missions—whose contents may be selected by the player—are available through the game's "Random Scenario Builder". Before undertaking missions, the player outfits the squad and protagonist with PBA suits and equipment. The three types of PBA—Scout, Standard and Heavy—vary in ability; for example, the Scout armor is fast and light, while the Heavy armor is slow and powerful. Each may be fitted with weapons and an "Auxiliary Suit Function" (ASF); the latter ranges from increased jumpjet power to deployable automatic turrets. Only a small amount of equipment is available at the outset, but more becomes accessible as the game progresses. Between missions, the player may read e-mails, news and military files, and a "library" that details the game's setting.

== Plot ==
=== Setting and characters ===
Terra Nova is set in a science fictional depiction of the year 2327 and takes place in the Alpha Centauri star system. The setting's early inspirations were the novels Starship Troopers and The Forever War, and PC Gamer UK compared it to that of the 1986 action film Aliens. Over two hundred years before the beginning of the game, Earth is subsumed by a world government called the Hegemony, whose "Publicanism" philosophy PC Zone summarized as "communism without the economic restrictions". The Hegemony annexes colonies throughout the Solar System, but the inhabitants of Jupiter's moons reach an agreement that allows them to relocate to Alpha Centauri, where they settle on the Earth-like NewHope and the frozen Thatcher planets. The settlers divide into twelve "Clans"—each with a military "Strike Force" to defend against bandits—and create the Centauri Council to govern the system. Trade is established with the Hegemony. As the game begins, an elite Strike Force called Strike Force Centauri is formed in response to increasing pirate activity.

The protagonist of Terra Nova is Nikola ap Io, the squad leader of Strike Force Centauri. His older brother, Brandt ap Io, is one of his subordinates, and the two share a mutual animosity. Other members of the squad include Sarah Walker, the daughter of a Centauri Council member; Ernest Schuyler, who is known for his sense of humor; and the frank and abrasive Simon Ashford. Each member was given a personality so that the player would form connections with the squad. Commander Arlen MacPherson assumes overall charge of the squad, and he has regular dealings with Hegemony ambassador Creon Pentheus. Live-action full-motion video cutscenes depicting character interaction occasionally play between missions.

=== Story ===
As the game begins, pirates steal a shipment of highly destructive "Petrovsk grenades". A reconnaissance mission by Nikola identifies the grenades at a heavily defended pirate base, and they are recovered en route to a transport ship. Without the grenades, the base is assaulted by Strike Force Centauri, and Hegemony equipment is found there. When MacPherson confronts Pentheus about the incident, he denies involvement. Proof of the Hegemony's intentions is later found at a Thatcher smuggling base, and Pentheus declares war on the Centauri colonies. Now knowing the pirates are funded by the Hegemony, MacPherson suspects that a previous information leak was in fact the work of a Hegemony spy; Nikola questions Brandt, who responds with indignance. After a series of missions against the Hegemony, Nikola's aircraft is ambushed and shot down, and he is captured by Pentheus. During this time, Pentheus tells him that a traitor within Strike Force Centauri is responsible for the ambush. The squad rescues Nikola, but Schuyler is killed in the assault. At his funeral, Ashford accuses Nikola as the traitor.

It soon becomes clear that MacPherson is being poisoned. Nikola believes that Brandt is responsible, because of his recent disappearances, but is proven wrong. After MacPherson dies, Sarah Walker takes his place as commander of Strike Force Centauri. Walker sends Nikola, disguised as a pirate, on an espionage mission to discover the traitor's identity. Nikola finds information that incriminates Ashford, who, when confronted, boasts of his actions and leaps to his death from a docking bay. The squad continues the war, and the Hegemony is eventually forced to gather its remaining forces at a base on Thatcher. The squad destroys the facility by detonating a highly explosive fuel tank inside it. Following its defeat, the Hegemony denies involvement in the war, declares Pentheus a rogue agent and appoints a new ambassador to the system. While angered by the announcement, Strike Force Centauri celebrates its victory as the game ends.

== Development ==
Terra Nova was conceived in 1992, around the time that Looking Glass Technologies' first game, Ultima Underworld: The Stygian Abyss, was completed. Company co-founder Paul Neurath wrote a design document for a tactical, squad-based game with a science fiction setting, and he helped the team initiate its development. Artist Robb Waters created concept art. It was originally titled Freefall, because of the way the soldiers enter combat by dropping from aircraft. Development was initially led by a newly hired programmer who envisioned the game as an exact simulation, in which every element was as realistic as possible. Programmer Dan Schmidt created the game's artificial intelligence, and he attempted to make squadmates intelligently follow orders and provide assistance, instead of merely "staying out of your way". Schmidt hired Eric Brosius and Terri Brosius, then-members of the band Tribe, to compose the game's music, which was called "orchestrally flavored" by the Boston Herald. As with their 1995 video game Flight Unlimited, Looking Glass Technologies self-published Terra Nova.

The game began production alongside the company's second project, Ultima Underworld II: Labyrinth of Worlds, and remained in development after that game's 1993 release. It then continued through the creation of their titles System Shock (released in 1994) and Flight Unlimited. The game was subject to numerous delays, which Schmidt later attributed to its lack of a set deadline. He stated that the team was "trying to go with the same philosophy" as the company's earlier games, in that they would "develop the systems and the game would come out of it". However, the team's development priorities regularly changed, and the programmer who led the project left several years into production. According to Schmidt, his departure meant that "there was no-one left who was psyched about making this really [realistic] simulation". Despite this fact, the team continued using the idea, even though serious difficulties were involved in achieving it. Schmidt said that the game's development status was uncertain after the programmer left, and that he inherited the role of lead programmer around that time merely because the position had to be filled. He later assumed the role of project leader. In January 1995, Looking Glass showed Terra Nova alongside Flight Unlimited at the Winter Consumer Electronics Show, under their "Immersive Reality" marketing label.

In the team's original plan, Terra Nova consisted of missions that were bookended by simplistic cutscenes, akin to those of the 1990 Origin Systems video game Wing Commander. However, in 1994, Origin released Wing Commander III: Heart of the Tiger, which features live-action full-motion video (FMV) cutscenes. This pressured Looking Glass into incorporating FMV into Terra Nova. Schmidt later said, "Lots of A-list games were including more and more FMV, and it was felt by management that if Terra Nova didn't have any, it would look second-rate." The decision to include it came when the game was already overdue, and a large portion of the game's funding was redirected toward cutscene production. A scriptwriter from outside the company was hired to write the cutscenes; because of the interplay between the cutscenes and missions, the script underwent numerous rewrites. The game's delays and large budget resulted in the removal of a planned online multiplayer component, and the FMV cutscenes, which were expensive to produce, increased the number of sales needed to recoup development costs. A patch was planned to release post-launch in September 1996 and add the online multiplayer functionality, but it did not materialize. Schmidt called the cutscenes a "giant distraction" for the team and himself as project leader: he later described them as "cheesier than most" of those from the period and noted that "I wince a lot looking back on [them]". Schmidt believed that they were likely an error from a business standpoint, as they further increased the game's budget and production length, but ultimately did not increase sales.

Roughly a year before its release, the team concluded that Terra Nova's realistic, simulation-style gameplay was not enjoyable. However, Schmidt said that the game's already lengthy development meant that it had to be released; otherwise, he believed that it would be canceled, or that its high cost would bankrupt the company. As a result, the game was completely redesigned to be "much more arcadey" only a few months before release. Schmidt said that, in the new game, "you were going around blowing people up" and "your enemies have brackets on them showing their health and it's very bright and glowy and green". He believed that these elements drastically increased the game's enjoyability. He summarized, "Six months before it shipped the game wasn't fun at all and we actually ended up shipping something that was at least somewhat enjoyable to play". After previously being slated to launch in the second quarter of 1995, the game was released on March 5, 1996; by this time, its graphical technology had been surpassed by other video games, according to Schmidt. Lead programmer Art Min later expressed dissatisfaction with the game: he believed that, while the team coalesced at the end of development, they shipped the game too soon because of "an overexcited VP of Product Development".

=== Technology ===
Unlike Looking Glass' previous first-person games—Ultima Underworld, Ultima Underworld II and System Shock—Terra Nova takes place in outdoor environments. The game's engine, named TED, supports weather conditions, day and night environments, real-time water reflections and moving clouds, among other effects. Most of the work on the outdoor renderer was done by programmer Eric Twietmeyer; however, contemporary computers were not powerful enough to display fully three-dimensional (3D) outdoor environments. The problem was solved by programmer James Fleming: the game's engine renders and applies textures to foreground objects in full 3D graphics, but—according to PC Gamer US—it displays a "bitmapped background in the distance" to provide the "illusion of detail". As with Flight Unlimited and the CD-ROM release of System Shock, Terra Nova was designed to support head-mounted displays. The game features QSound technology. Describing QSound's effect before the game's release, Suzanne Kantra Kirschner of Popular Science wrote that "you'll hear the rustle of leaves from the right speaker a split second before you hear it in the left[,] signaling you that the enemy is approaching from the right".

The game's characters are procedurally animated via simulated physics models and inverse kinematics (IK)—a system designed by programmer Seamus Blackley. Basic physics are used to move character models through the environment, and the models are animated by the IK system in accordance with this movement. Designer Richard Wyckoff later compared the character physics to those of a marble, and Schmidt described the technique as akin to putting each character in a hamster ball. The system's imperfect nature can result in animation glitches. A more realistic simulation of bipedal movement was originally planned, but it was simplified before release because of coding difficulties. Schmidt later said that the original method "almost always worked", but that "every thirty minutes someone would put their foot down slightly wrong ... and then go flying off across the map". A physics model is also used to simulate weapon recoil, the arc of projectiles and the gravity of each planet; for example, projectiles travel farther in low gravity environments.

== Reception ==
Reception

Review scores
Publication	Score
Computer Gaming World	4/5
Edge	9/10
Next Generation	4/5
PC Gamer (UK)	91%
PC Zone	9.0
Computer Games Strategy Plus	4/5
PC Magazine	4/4
Maximum	4/5
PC Games	B+

Awards
Publication	Award
PC Gamer UK	Game of the Month
Computer Games Strategy Plus	Best Science-fiction Simulation
PC Games	Game of the Month

Although Terra Nova sold more than 100,000 units, it was a commercial failure because it did not recoup its development costs. Designer Tim Stellmach later characterized its performance as "a disaster". Despite this, the game was acclaimed by critics, and several publications drew comparisons to the 1995 video game MechWarrior 2: 31st Century Combat.

Edge compared the game favorably to System Shock due to its balanced combination of action and strategy, stating that in just two years Looking Glass "has metamorphosed from one of the industry's secret technology powerhouses to a hugely respected developer in its own right." John Payne of The Washington Post wrote, "Depending on your point of view, Terra Nova is either a stripped-down Mechwarrior or a souped-up Doom." However, he stated that it was enjoyable regardless of which perspective was taken. While he described the game's animation as "fluid", he found its graphics in general to be "fairly blocky, even at a distance". He finished his review by stating that the game "requires more practice than action fans are used to" but provides "a nice payoff". Next Generation Magazine wrote, "Looking Glass has always been known for breaking the barriers of conventional gameplay, and it has done it again with Terra Nova". The magazine considered the game to be "an all around stunning effort".

The Sunday Star-Times' Peter Eley found the game to be extremely complex, and he noted the originality of its "real-time, full motion and 3D combat simulation". He called its sound and music "stunning" but found that its graphics "aren't as crisp as some other games", and he described performance issues. Lee Perkins of The Age also found the game's performance and graphics lacking, but he said, "In spite of its visual shortcomings, Terra Nova has the same level of inherent player appeal as System Shock". He concluded that the game's "tactical demands ... are probably its strongest point", and that it "isn't quite up in the Mechwarrior 2 league, [but] it's making some very loud noises with avid mech-combat fans". Computer Games Strategy Plus' Tim Royal offered similar praise for its strategic elements; however, like the other two, he noted the game's performance issues, and he called its graphics "above average, but not mind-boggling". He finished, "I ... won't say it beats System Shock. It doesn't. ... But Terra Nova offers a wonderful variety of terrain, mission types, and scenarios".

William Wong of Computer Shopper called it "a great game that is backed by good graphics and sound, and will keep you going for hours"; he also praised its cutscenes. He concluded, "If the [upcoming] multiplayer pack is as good as the standalone version, Terra Nova could be a strike force to be reckoned with." PC Gamer UK's James Flynn praised the game's graphics, sense of realism, and free-form missions; about the latter, he wrote, "There's no right or wrong way to complete any of the missions in Terra Nova, and this is one of its strongest assets." He noted that it was "virtually impossible to recommend" the game to those with lower-end computers, but he believed that it was also "impossible to condemn Looking Glass for programming the game this way, because it feels so real, and its authenticity is what makes it so much fun". Daniel Jevons of Maximum approved of the graphics but disliked the focus on long-range combat and the use of the mouse to move a crosshair rather than the entire viewpoint. However, he concluded that the game "has a degree of depth that most robot combat games lack, the plot is strangely involving and despite the initial control difficulties, with perseverance most competent gamers will soon be stomping around the battlefields". Michael E. Ryan of PC Magazine praised the game's artificial intelligence and called its graphical quality "spectacular", but found its movement controls to be "awkward". He concluded, "Terra Nova is an exceptional game that combines frenetic, fast-paced action with real-time squad-level tactics. It doesn't get much better than this".

Terra Nova was named the 15th best computer game ever by PC Gamer UK in 1997. The editors called it "exactly the kind of dynamic, risk-taking, intelligent game we've been asking for". In 2000, Computer Games Strategy Plus named it one of the "10 Best Sci-Fi Simulations" of all time.

=== Legacy ===
The New York Times has cited Terra Nova as one of the first 3D games with squad-oriented gameplay. GameSpy's Bill Hiles said that the game "preceded the 'tactical squad-based, first-person shooter' action genre by a full two years", and that "In 1996, ...Terra Nova didn't feel like any other game out there". Hiles called Tribes 2 "a spiritual descendent of Terra Nova if there ever was one". Project leader Dan Schmidt later said that he had "a bit of a negative experience overall because the thing dragged on forever", but he noted that "there are people who regard it highly so it can't have been that terrible". The 1998 video game Jurassic Park: Trespasser features a procedural animation system very similar to the one used in Terra Nova.

While Schmidt said before the game's release that the team wanted to develop "a whole series of games that take place in the Terra Nova world", the game's poor sales made the creation of a sequel "impractical", according to Paul Neurath. As the game's publisher, Looking Glass took on the full burden of its commercial underperformance, which contributed to the company's bankruptcy and closure in May 2000. Neurath later said, "If we could do Terra Nova over, I would have dumped the cinematics and done online team play instead. Who knows, maybe then the Tribes II and Halo teams would be talking about the influence of Terra Nova on their games".
