= System Shock (series) =

Video game series

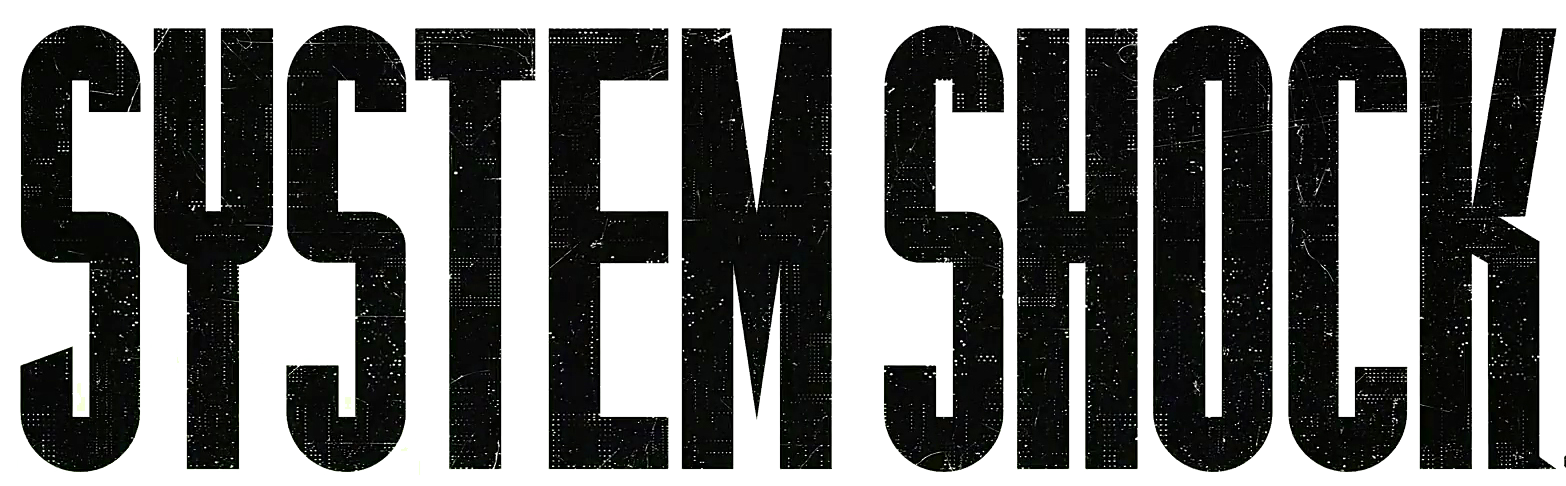
- Logo as of 2023
- Genre: First-person shooter
- Developers: Looking Glass Studios (1994–1999); Irrational Games (1999); Nightdive Studios (2012–present); OtherSide Entertainment (2015–2019)
- Publishers: Origin Systems (1994); Electronic Arts (1999); Nightdive Studios (2012–present); Prime Matter (2023)
- Composers: Greg LoPiccolo; Tim Ries; Josh Randall; Ramin Djawadi; Eric Brosius; Jonathan Peros
- Platforms: MS-DOS; Mac OS; PC-98; Windows; OS X; Linux; PlayStation 4; PlayStation 5; Xbox One; Xbox Series X/S
- First release: System Shock; September 23, 1994
- Latest release: System Shock 2: 25th Anniversary Remaster; June 26, 2025

System Shock is a science fiction video game series created by Looking Glass Technologies. It consists of System Shock, System Shock 2, and the 2023 System Shock remake. A third main entry, System Shock 3, has been announced.

The games undersold sales expectations but have become cult classics, and have inspired numerous games such as BioShock, Deus Ex, and Prey.

The series remained dormant until Nightdive Studios, a game developer dedicated to re-releasing classic video games, acquired the rights to re-release both games in 2012.

== Games ==
Release timeline
1994	System Shock
1995
1996
1997
1998
1999	System Shock 2
2000
2001
2002
2003
2004
2005
2006
2007
2008
2009
2010
2011
2012
2013
2014
2015	System Shock: Enhanced Edition
2016
2017
2018
2019
2020
2021
2022
2023	System Shock (remake)
2024
2025	System Shock 2: 25th Anniversary Remaster
TBA	System Shock 3

=== System Shock (1994) ===
System Shock was developed by Looking Glass Studios and published by Origin Systems for MS-DOS, Mac OS, and PC-98. In it, the player controls a hacker who is caught attempting to steal files from the TriOptimum Corporation and is taken to Citadel Station. The player cooperates with Edward Diego, an executive from the aforementioned company, to remove the ethical constraints of the station's AI, SHODAN, in exchange for a military-grade neural implant. The implant requires the hacker to be placed into a six-month coma, and he awakens from his slumber to discover that SHODAN has gained control of the ship.

=== System Shock 2 (1999) ===
System Shock 2 was co-developed by Looking Glass Studios and the newly founded Irrational Games for Windows, and later OS X and Linux. The game takes place in the starship of the Von Braun, where a hivemind known as the Many begins infecting the crew.

The game was critically acclaimed for its atmosphere, gameplay, and story. However, the game underperformed, and the series went on a hiatus.

=== System Shock: Enhanced Edition (2015) ===
Nightdive Studios acquired the rights to the series in 2012, and three years later, released an updated version of System Shock titled System Shock: Enhanced Edition. It includes features such as an updated mouselook and resolution. The engine was later updated to the KEX Engine.

=== System Shock (2023) ===
Shortly after the release of System Shock: Enhanced Edition, Nightdive opened a Kickstarter campaign to fund a remake of the first game. The campaign's funding goal was $900,000; in the month-long campaign, they raised over $1.35 million, surpassing the original goal by over $450,000. The remake faced numerous development issues and switched the engine from Unity to Unreal Engine 4. It was released for Windows in May 2023, for PS4, PS5, XOne and XSXS in May 2024, for Nintendo Switch and Switch 2 in December 2025.

=== System Shock 2: 25th Anniversary Remaster (2025) ===
On a stream during the 20th anniversary of System Shock 2 on August 11, 2019, Nightdive Studios announced an Enhanced Edition of the game was in development. Nightdive had been able to disassemble the original game's source code, allowing them to improve upon the original and port the game to their KEX Engine, the same engine they used for the System Shock: Enhanced Edition.

It was originally also planned that a virtual reality version of the game would release alongside the Enhanced Edition; however, it was internally scrapped midway through development, for unknown reasons. The VR version would have used gameplay features that were introduced with Half-Life: Alyx, and would have also been capable of cross-platform play with players on other platforms than VR.

In 2025, the port was renamed "System Shock 2: 25th Anniversary Remaster" and released on June 26, 2025, for Windows. A console port was also developed for the PlayStation 4, Xbox One, PlayStation 5, Xbox Series X/S and Nintendo Switch and is due to be released on July 20.

=== System Shock 3 (TBA) ===
System Shock 3 was announced in 2015. Multiple attempts at a sequel to System Shock 2 have failed. However, OtherSide Entertainment has received the rights to create a new game. The game takes place in a TriOptimum Blacksite during 2089.

The game's status is unknown, as Warren Spector, the founder of OtherSide has stated that they haven't worked on the game since 2019, and since they approached Tencent for financing, it is up to them about what happens to System Shock 3.

== Television adaptation ==
A live-action science fiction horror drama series was announced in 2021. The show will be available for Binge, a streaming service centered on video game-based projects. Allan Ungar, with Nightdive's Larry Kuperman and Stephen Kick producing. By 2022 Greg Russo was attached to direct the series in his directorial debut.

== See also ==
- System Shock Infinite, a System Shock 2 mod released in 2015.
