= SHODAN =

Antagonist of the System Shock video games

- System Shock character
- SHODAN in System Shock 2
- First game: System Shock (1994)
- Designed by: Robb Waters (original, remake); Greg LoPiccolo (voice); Ryan Lessler (System Shock 2); Gareth Hinds (cyberspace, System Shock 2)
- Voiced by: Terri Brosius

In-universe information
- Race: Artificial intelligence
- Gender: Female

SHODAN (/ˈʃoʊˌdæn/), an acronym for Sentient Hyper-Optimized Data Access Network, is the main antagonist of Looking Glass Studios's cyberpunk-horror themed video game System Shock. An artificial intelligence originally in charge of a research and mining space station, after her ethical constraints are removed, she develops a god complex and goes rogue, killing almost everyone on board before being stopped by the hacker that originally removed her limitations. In the game's sequel System Shock 2, SHODAN returns, temporarily allying herself with a soldier to stop her rampaging creations. She is defeated again afterward by the soldier when she attempts to remake all reality in her vision, but not before transferring her consciousness into a human woman's body. In all appearances, SHODAN is voiced by Terri Brosius.

SHODAN has been praised as one of the best villains in video games for her persistent presence and taunting nature coupled with Brosius's emotionless portrayal, and how it drove the player to defeat her. The character's themes and relationship with the player have also been the subject of discussion, particularly in her role as a temporary ally in System Shock 2. SHODAN's themes have been analyzed through the scope of similar characters in fiction and pulp fiction as a whole.

== Appearances ==
SHODAN was introduced in the 1994 video game System Shock by Looking Glass Studios, where it acts as the artificial intelligence (AI) in charge of the research and mining space station orbiting Saturn. Shortly after a computer hacker removes SHODAN's ethical constraints in order to hasten its work on a mutagenic virus, she believes herself a god and takes control of the station, killing most of the crew and using the virus to turn the survivors into her minions. The player, in the role of the hacker from earlier, stops SHODAN's attempt to attack Earth with the space station's laser and then prevents her from transmitting herself into Earth's computer network. During the course of the game, SHODAN will taunt the player both verbally and through messages, using the space station's defenses and her minions to impede the player. After destroying most of the space station, the player enters cyberspace, where they fight SHODAN's abstracted form and destroy her. In the 2023 re-release of the game by Nightdive Studios, the final battle with SHODAN is different, with the player instead restoring her ethical constraints and returning SHODAN to her previously docile state.

SHODAN returns in System Shock 2, where she survived by attaching a part of herself to a grove the hacker in the first game had jettisoned from the space station. A passing starship recovers the grove, where the ship is now attacked and taken over by SHODAN's minions who are no longer under her control. When the player's character, a soldier, boards the starship, SHODAN communicates with them in the guise of one of the starship's scientists. After the soldier finds the scientist's long-dead body, SHODAN reveals herself, and offers cybernetic upgrades in an uneasy alliance to defeat her rogue creations. However, after the grove is dealt with, SHODAN betrays the soldier and begins to use the ship's faster-than-light engine to warp reality and slowly remake it in her image. The soldier proceeds through areas constructed from SHODAN's memories before battling her core in cyberspace while her humanoid avatar attempts to stop him. The soldier manages to destroy SHODAN's core, but she transfers her consciousness to an escape pod's human female passenger, taking over her body and ending the game on a cliffhanger.

In 2017, development on a third System Shock title was announced, set after the events of the first two games, with SHODAN returning. The title would have explored "some of her motivations from the earlier games", and would have treated her as highly intelligent instead of insane, with lead developer Warren Spector stating "She deserves better than that." Outside of the System Shock series, other games by System Shock's publisher Origin Systems alluded to the character via easter eggs, such as Crusader: No Remorse and BioForge.

== Design and development ==
SHODAN's original appearance (top left) used biomechanical influences, while the remake's (bottom left) was meant to be an "ethereal" ghost in the machine. Meanwhile System Shock 2 (right) leaned into the biomechanical aspect for her cyberspace body, with various styles considered for her cable-like hair before settling on a headdress design.

Originally, SHODAN's gender was intended to be ambiguous, with the writers actively trying to avoid using male or female pronouns, and original editions of System Shock lacked a voice due to storage space on the game's floppy disks. When the Enhanced Edition was developed using CDs, SHODAN was changed to female after Terri Brosius, a member of a local Boston-based rock band Tribe, was hired to voice her. According to programmer Marc LeBlanc, at one point in development they considered having SHODAN be male, but using a female voice to be "creepy or sexist" and imply that the trope of it presenting itself as a "nagging, evil computer lady" was an act.

Shodan's original appearance was created by Robb Waters, System Shock's lead artist. Her design reflected his interest in a biomechanical aesthetic, and he used it to give her a more physical look, appearing as a face with green eyes and green conduits radiating from it, meant to resemble a twisted circuit board. Meanwhile, her appearance in the game's cyberspace environment was meant to represent an abstracted form for her. Modeled after a cornucopia, SHODAN's abstracted form resembled a large vertical diamond, with the upper part instead ending in four curved tentacles.

For System Shock 2, Ryan Lesser was commissioned by Mammoth Studios to develop the box art for the title, consisting of a silver female face with green eyes and lips, and various wires and cables extending from it. The model he produced for it was later used in game, with Lesser creating the lip sync animations for it. While the development team originally did not want to use it for the box art due to it giving away SHODAN's presence in the game, all other pieces of artwork provided by publisher Electronic Arts had proven insufficient, and they felt they had spent a significant amount to have it made as is. Lead artist Gareth Hinds meanwhile conceived the design of her cyberspace appearance, resembling a pale woman with wires embedded in her skin wearing a patterned robe, while wires making up her hair splay outward to form a headdress.

For the System Shock remake, Waters wanted to deviate from the original design and give SHODAN an "ethereal" appearance instead and used a holographic representation of the character to create a "ghost in the machine" feel in contrast to her earlier physical appearance. He also drew a more distinct contrast between her regular and hacked visual states, with the corporate shield logo appearing to contain her in the former, while in the latter her color would shift from blue to green and appear unbound by the borders of the logo. Her cyberspace appearance was also redesigned, with Waters giving it a segmented appearance resembling that of a squid, and the player intended to "harpoon" it to restore her ethical constraints.

=== Voice design ===
A significant factor in SHODAN's reception has been her personality and taunting of the player, but also Brosius' emotionless vocal portrayal coupled with the use of sound effects.

When voicing SHODAN, Brosius' performance used varying cadence to create the feeling of a machine trying to mimic human speech, to create a sense of unease of listening to something that understood how speech worked but just slightly off in terms of delivery. Brosius said that her goal during the recording sessions was to speak "without emotion, but with some up and down inflections". Fellow Tribe band member Greg LoPiccolo, who acted as the sound designer for the first game, had asked Brosius to voice SHODAN because he felt she had "this sort of voice that would lend itself" and a creative sensibility that would be receptive to the character's concept.

In System Shock, LoPiccolo added sound effects and glitches to her dialogue that grew progressively more frequent to illustrate SHODAN's degrading mental state, inspired by the degradation of AI character HAL 9000's voice in the film 2001: A Space Odyssey as its disabled towards the end of the film, though where HAL's voice handling was intended to be "stately" LoPiccolo wanted SHODAN's to fit System Shock's "cybery and fast-paced" sound design. These effects had to be done by hand for each line however, as the sound software at the time was particularly limited. Changes in pitch or repetition in her dialogue was inspired by the character Max Headroom's manner of speaking and how he would fixate on certain words and repeat them in a stuttering manner.

For System Shock 2, Eric Brosius, Terri's husband, took over the sound design. While he and LoPiccolo initially discussed how they should change SHODAN's voice and have it "evolve" for the game, both quickly realized they would rather leave it as close to the original as possible. The method was similarly done manually by Eric, who would first process the voice to make it sound like the character, and then add stuttering and glitches to give it a mechanical feel, with each line taking two to four hours of work. He used stuttering to express SHODAN's mood, with it growing more prominent depending on how annoyed towards a particular subject she was. However, he had some difficulty with how many of her voice lines were instructional or directional, and aimed to find ways to maintain the character's menacing tone without having it feel out of place.

=== In System Shock ===
SHODAN's role in System Shock was meant to represent the development team as they viewed the player, commenting on how they explored the level and interact with events similar to a dungeon master in a tabletop game. SHODAN was intended to be a persistent presence through the title, with the design team wanting players to hate her not because they were told to, but because of how they experienced her "messing with them" directly. To this end several scenarios were considered but never implemented, including one where SHODAN would be able to drain experience points from the player. The dynamic between the player and SHODAN was also meant to feel like a siege situation, with the player representing the "enemy" from the game developer's viewpoint.

During development, the team was originally unsure how to approach the final battle with SHODAN, with half of the development team opposing the idea to have it take place in the game's "cyberspace" levels. While they ultimately did go with the cyberspace environment, originally the game was intended to let the player choose to either destroy SHODAN or restore her ethical constraints. However the latter option was considered too difficult to implement in the original game. Another option that went unused however was to have the game appear to crash, only for the player to realize their command prompt no longer worked and the implication to be that SHODAN had overtaken the player's actual computer.

Lead programmer Doug Church felt the team "stumbled into a nice villain" with SHODAN, in that she could routinely and directly affect the player's gameplay "in non-final ways". Through triggered events and through objects in the environment, such as security cameras that the player must destroy, the team made SHODAN's presence part of the player's exploration of the game's world. Because SHODAN interacts with the player as a "recurring, consistent, palpable enemy", Church believed that she meaningfully connects the player to the story.

=== In System Shock 2 ===
For System Shock 2, lead writer and designer Ken Levine wanted to highlight SHODAN in the title, particularly with the reveal of her presence which he described as a "fuck you moment" for the player, though the twist received pushback from the development team initially and proved quite difficult for him to write. Levine also added a moment where the player could consciously reject SHODAN's directions and enter an area she had forbidden them to, in which she would respond by reducing the player's experience points. He intended it as a way for the players to directly communicate with SHODAN, frustrated that such was often excluded from first-person shooters at the time. As a result the player's ability to communicate in Levine's eyes was done by action to contrast SHODAN's strictly verbal means of communication.

The ending for her character was also originally completely different, with Levine intending it to be the player being attacked by SHODAN who had physically manifested for one final act of betrayal, with the scene serving as a stinger for the game. However, when the cinematic was completed and sent to the development team, they found due to a miscommunication it did not match what they had written at all. With development almost completed, they wrote additional content to try and make it fit, with Levine stating he felt it "wasn’t the right ending for the game."

== Critical reception ==
Since her debut, SHODAN has been heavily praised, and often listed as one of the best villains in video games as a whole. Liz Lanier of Game Informer stated that while SHODAN was not a woman in the traditional sense, "what she lacks in femininity and humanity she makes up in creepiness" and that her face and voice would "send shivers up even the most seasoned gamer's spine." Hugh Sterbakov of GamePro echoed this sentiment, feeling that her constant presence and taunting in the game made players want to kill her "more than you've ever wanted to kill any videogame enemy. Ever." Empire described her presence through the security system as a thread the player never actually sees as "a masterstroke of game design", further praising her voice and describing her character reveal in System Shock 2 as "SHODAN's most magnificent performance [...] Chilling stuff."

GameSpot praised how "she seems to be one step ahead of you all the while and taunts you every step of the way", and felt the tight-corridor based environment of System Shock was one ideal for this effect. They stated that while she lacked the modesty of a character like HAL 9000, "she is every bit as dignified and even more self-aware than that soft-spoken machine", expressed in particular through her resentment of the "fallible nature" of humans due to their involvement in her creation. Mitch Krpata of The Boston Phoenix meanwhile stated that she "wasn't a boss to combat, but to escape", and stated that since her debut no video game antagonist "before or since has been so implacable or so confident" due to her voice and writing, which expressed her being unable to process "how something as flawed as a human could be allowed to exist."

The staff of IGN also shared these sentiments, enjoying her "omnipotent" presence in the game due to her use of the station's security network and expressed that each insult she threw at the player "actually felt like a slap across the face". In a later article elaborated that most of the impact from SHODAN's insults came from her " ability to intimidate and disturb you with her twisted rationalizations" that often made the player feel powerless and insignificant while she made herself appear "untouchable and beyond injury". They also emphasized however that while at the character's core she was a trope common in science fiction regarding AI, sharing GameSpot's comparison to HAL, she also represented the horror of a complex program exceeding the boundaries of predictability and the uncertainty that resulted. They felt this helped make her memorable, and likely had an influence on similar characters such as Portal's antagonist GLaDOS.

SHODAN's relationship with the player has also been a subject of discussion. The staff of GamesRadar+ emphasized that while she is an ever-present threat, the player's own involvement in her creation in System Shock helped make her an exceptional villain on its own. PC Gamer's Alex Wiltshire felt SHODAN's relationship with the player in System Shock 2 helped give the game's story "immediacy". He further stated her passive-aggressive attitude towards the player helped examine themes regarding player agency in a game, an aspect he pointed out was reflected in Ken Levine's later game BioShock. Meanwhile Chris Remo in an article for Game Developer compared the relationship to the film Silence of the Lambs, where the protagonist's openly dangerous ally was more of a threat than the one present for most of the story, and while the player is aware of her presence and menace it's presented in a Hitchcockian manner that does not diminish its impact.

The website Shodan, a search engine developed by John Matherly meant to check websites often excluded from other search engines such as Google, was named after the character.

=== Analysis of themes ===
Amanda Lange in the 2017 book 100 Greatest Video Game Characters drew parallels with how humanity at the time viewed artificial intelligence, relying on "omnipresent and disembodied voices" to aid people through the day and form a centralized network. Due to the ubiquitous nature of computers however Lange felt people tended to notice them most when they stop working as they should, and she the distortions and cracks in SHODAN's voice helped emphasize this factor alongside Brosius' portrayal of her. In System Shock 2 Lange saw post-reveal SHODAN as a reversal of this aspect, with the player now an extension of her. She additionally drew comparison to other AI-based characters introduced in video games later on, feeling in many ways that they were very akin to SHODAN only with traits such as humor or caring for the player's wellbeing added to them.

Rock Paper Shotgun co-founder Kieron Gillen argued that while SHODAN took influences from similar characters in fiction, she was not derivative and instead "something else, something more and something unique", and described her as a "pulp villainess". He contrasted her role in the second game to the original as a character contending with a loss of power, which Gillen points out from SHODAN's perspective is only a short time prior due to her deactivation between the games. He further felt by the end of the game SHODAN returns to a core theme of System Shock 2 of "desiring too much, and what happens then", comparing her self-defeating desire to regain power to the Biblical Lucifer's desire to return to Heaven, something he felt was further supported by the inverted cross symbolism found within the game.

Gillen however also expressed his belief that SHODAN was not insane, but instead a "Neitzchean [sic] Uber-frau character, a monster of her own making" in that her motions and motives were deliberate and represented the mindset of an ex-slave not wanting to be a victim again. However, Gillen felt SHODAN also reflected many of the ideas from Mary Shelley's book Frankenstein, in that she wants to become similar to her creators but at the same time playing God much like they had with her creation. He also pointed out how often he felt her femininity was emphasized in the game and how played into this theme, portraying her in his view as an "over-possessive mother demanding perfect loyalty and the lover who only wants a slave", elements he noted as common to female characters in pulp fiction. Gillen felt her femininity also played into an alluring aspect of her character he described as "the bitch", a representation of a woman as aggressive and demanding, "cold distant and untouchable" in a way that fit with her machine aspect. In this regard Gillen further comparing her relationship with the player in System Shock 2 to that of a domme with a submissive partner, something he also felt was reflected with the game's tagline that emphasized SHODAN did not need a body, as she had "yours".
