= Terri Brosius =

American actress

- Born: United States
- Occupations: Musician, voice actress, game designer
- Years active: 1985–present
- Known for: Voice of SHODAN in the System Shock series

Terri Brosius (née Barous) is an American musician, voice actress, and game designer, best known in gaming circles as the voice of SHODAN in the System Shock series.

== Biography ==
Terri was a member of the Boston band Tribe as a keyboardist and occasional vocalist. On Tribe's albums Here at the Home and Abort, she sang the song "Rescue Me". On Tribe's album Sleeper, she sang the song "Mr. Lieber". Following the band's separation in 1994, she and Tribe guitarist Eric Brosius married. Terri is currently a keyboardist and backup vocalist for the Boston-based band The Vivs.

Brosius and her husband, along with Tribe bass player Greg LoPiccolo, joined video game developer Looking Glass Studios, where they worked on various game projects until its closure in 2000. She and her husband continue to work on various projects with Harmonix.

Brosius performed the voice of the character SHODAN in the CD enhanced version of System Shock and later remaster of the game by Nightdive Studios, and also in the Irrational Games co-developed sequel, System Shock 2, in addition to several other characters. Brosius voiced the character Viktoria in Thief: The Dark Project and Thief II: The Metal Age, and did some level and cutscene design for Thief: Gold and Thief II, and co-wrote Thief: Deadly Shadows' story with Randy Smith. She also voiced Ava Johnson in Deus Ex: Invisible War. She is set to reprise her role as SHODAN in System Shock 3. Brosius was announced to be voicing a character in the upcoming game Gloomwood in a trailer for the 2022 PC Gaming Show.

=== Voice acting roles ===
Year	Title	Developer	Notes
1994	System Shock (CD enhanced version)	LookingGlass Technologies	Also writer
1996	Terra Nova: Strike Force Centauri	LookingGlass Technologies	
1998	Thief: The Dark Project	LookingGlass Technologies	Also writer
1999	Thief: Gold	LookingGlass Technologies	Also writer, level designer
1999	System Shock 2	Irrational Games; Looking Glass Studios	
2000	Thief II: The Metal Age	Looking Glass Studios	Also writer, level designer
2003	Deus Ex: Invisible War	Ion Storm	
2004	Thief: Deadly Shadows	Ion Storm	Also writer
2012	Dishonored	Arkane Studios	Also writer
2013	Interstellar Marines	Zero Point Software	
2015	Spider: Rite of the Shrouded Moon	Tiger Style	Also writer
2016	Dishonored 2	Arkane Studios	Also writer
2022	Gloomwood	Dillon Rogers; David Szymanski	
2023	System Shock (Remake)	Nightdive Studios	
2026	Blood West: Scavengers	Hyperstrange	
TBA	System Shock 3	OtherSide Entertainment	
