= Abort (album) =

Studio album by Tribe
- Released: September 1991
- Recorded: 1987–1991
- Genre: Alternative rock, art rock
- Length: 44:21
- Label: Slash/Warner Bros.
- Producer: Gil Norton, Chris Sheldon

Tribe chronology
Here at the Home (1990)	Abort (1991)	Sleeper (1993)

Abort is the second studio album by the Boston alternative rock band Tribe, released in 1991. Released by Slash Records/Warner Bros. Records, it was the band's major label debut.

Eight of the ten tracks from Here at the Home were re-recorded for Abort. Four tracks were brand new: "Easter Dinner", "Joyride (I Saw the Film)", "Payphone", and "Serenade".

The track "Pinwheels" was also re-recorded for Abort but in the end was not put on the album. It was released as a b-side in the Easter Dinner E.P.

Three singles were released from the album as EPs: "Easter Dinner", "Payphone", and "Joyride (I Saw the Film)". The band shot a video for "Joyride".

== Production ==
The album was produced by Gil Norton and Chris Sheldon. It was recorded and mixed at Blue Jay Recording Studio, in Carlisle, Massachusetts, from January to February 1991. "Here at the Home" is about agoraphobia.

== Critical reception ==
Professional ratings
Review scores
Source	Rating
AllMusic	4/5 stars

The Boston Herald wrote that "the broad new arrangements are engaging improvements on the band's home-grown tapes, though 'Tied' has lost its eerie appeal."

== Track listing ==
No.	Title	Writer(s)	Length
1.	"Here at the Home"	Brosius, LoPiccolo	3:06
2.	"Easter Dinner"	LoPiccolo	2:58
3.	"Abort"	Tribe	3:22
4.	"Rescue Me"	Barous, Brosius, LaValley	3:10
5.	"Joyride (I Saw the Film)"	LoPiccolo	4:06
6.	"Payphone"	Barous, Brosius	4:00
7.	"Daddy's Home"	Barous	3:11
8.	"Jakpot"	LoPiccolo	4:01
9.	"Serenade"	Barous	4:05
10.	"Tied"	Barous	3:55
11.	"Outside"	LoPiccolo	4:24
12.	"Vigil"	Barous, LaValley	3:57

== Personnel ==
- Janet LaValley: vocals, rhythm guitar
- Terri Barous: keyboard, backing vocals
- Eric Brosius: lead guitar, backing vocals
- Greg LoPiccolo: bass, backing vocals
- David Penzo: drums, percussion
