= Bobby Newmark =

Fictional character by author William Gibson

Bobby Newmark is one of the main characters in the William Gibson novel Count Zero. His handle in the Matrix is "Count Zero", from which the novel derives its name. Newmark is one of several Gibson characters who live through information.

== Fictional character biography ==
At the beginning of Count Zero, Bobby Newmark lives in his mother's condominium in Barrytown, New Jersey. Bobby is a hotdogger, a neophyte hacker with aspirations of becoming a big-time cowboy in the worldwide cyberspace construct, the Matrix. He acquires an ICE breaker, software designed to defeat security systems, from a friend, unaware that it is actually a stolen experimental corporate model and that he is its unwitting test dummy. His test run ends in disaster, nearly costing him his life ("pulling a wilson", in hotdogger slang). At the last moment Bobby is rescued by the apparition of a girl, which releases him from the grasp of the ICE destroying his nervous system. This episode leads Bobby to leave home. Seeking the friend who lent him the software, Bobby becomes acquainted with Beauvoir and Lucas, two Matrix cowboys who learned of his salvation at the hands of the mysterious girl, whom they refer to as the Virgin. Lucas takes Bobby to the Sprawl, where he becomes entangled in a dispute between his new chaperons and the massive zaibatsu, Hosaka. With Bobby's help, the situation is eventually defused, and he is introduced to Angela Mitchell, the girl being sought after by Hosaka, and the mysterious Virgin who saved Bobby's life. Until this point, Angela has been in the care of the mercenary Turner, the protagonist of one of the book's other concurrent storylines. The two eventually become lovers.

In the third Sprawl novel, Mona Lisa Overdrive, Bobby, now eight years older, plays a less central role: he is comatose and jacked into a large gray box called an aleph, which is actually an unfathomably massive data storage device which contains a virtual reality approximation of the entire world. It is here that Bobby now makes his home. Throughout the book, it is shown that Bobby and Angela have been separated for an extended period because Bobby had mysteriously disappeared. At the end of the book, they are reunited, and Angela joins Bobby inside the aleph.

== Literary analysis ==
Bobby Newmark has been described as one of the "most fully developed of Gibson's characters".
