= Intrusion Countermeasures Electronics =

Phrase used in cyberpunk literature

Intrusion Countermeasures Electronics (ICE) is a term used in the cyberpunk subgenre to refer to security programs which protect computerized data from being accessed by hackers.

== Origin of term ==
The term was popularized by William Gibson in his short story "Burning Chrome", which also introduced the term cyberspace, and in his subsequent novel Neuromancer. According to the Jargon File, as well as Gibson's own acknowledgements, the term ICE was originally coined by Tom Maddox.

== Description of ICE ==
When viewed in a cyberspace virtual reality environment, these constructs are often represented by actual walls of ice, stone, or metal. Black ICE refers to ICE that are capable of killing the intruder if deemed necessary or appropriate; some forms of black ICE may be artificially intelligent.

== Real-world usage ==
Though real-life firewalls, anti-virus software and similar programs fall under this classification, the term has little real world significance and remains primarily a science fiction concept. This can be attributed to the fact that using the term "electronics" to describe software products (such as firewalls) is something of a misnomer. On the other hand, there is a strong connection between real-world cybercrime and cyberpunk literature. "The Gibsonian concept of cyberspace [...] fed back into both computer and information systems design and theory," wrote Roger Burrows.

The term ICE has occasionally been used for real-world software:

- BlackICE, an intrusion detection system built by a California company named Network ICE in 1999, acquired by IBM Internet Security Systems, then discontinued in 2007.
- The ICE cipher, an encryption algorithm, may be inspired by Gibson's ICE, but it is explained as meaning "Information Concealment Engine".
- The Java bytecode verifier in the Apache ByteCode Engineering Library (BCEL) is called JustIce (see the 'docs' folder for documentation).

On April 28, 2009, the Information and Communications Enhancement Act, or ICE Act for short, was introduced to the United States Senate by Senator Tom Carper to make changes to the handling of information security by the federal government, including the establishment of the National Office for Cyberspace.

== Usage in fiction ==
The term ICE is widely used in cyberpunk fiction.

=== Anime ===
- Cyberpunk: Edgerunners
- Cyber City Oedo 808
- Ghost in the Shell, where ICE is referred to directly by name or else as an 'Attack Barrier'.

=== Cartoons ===
- Phantom 2040, though in it "ICE" stands for "Integrated Cyber Environment", referring to cyberspace, rather than Intrusion Countermeasures Electronics

=== Card games ===
- Netrunner, based on Cyberpunk 2020 setting, where the corporate player uses ICE and the runner player uses icebreakers; while corps in Netrunner understand ICE to be an acronym for "Intrusion Countermeasures Electronics", the runner viewpoint is that the acronym should be for "Insidious Cortical Electrocution"
- Android: Netrunner, an adaptation of the original Netrunner for the Android setting
- Hacker and Hacker II - The Dark Side, where the players attempt to gain illicit access systems represented by playing cards arranged in a network while avoiding getting zapped by ICE and Black ICE.

=== Literature ===
- Neuromancer, original popularizer of the term
- Count Zero the second novel of William Gibson's "Sprawl trilogy"
- Hyperion, wherein black ICE is used to defend the TechnoCore
- Trouble and Her Friends by Melissa Scott, wherein IC(E) refers to Intrusion Countermeasures (Electronic), solving the problem of implying that the measures are hardware-based

=== Roleplaying games ===
- Cyberpunk 2020, upon which the Netrunner card game is based
- GURPS Cyberpunk
- Shadowrun, called IC (The setting drops the "electronics" misnomer) but is colloquially named "Ice" by hackers in the setting
- Shadow of the Beanstalk, a roleplaying game based on Android universe

=== Movies ===
- Johnny Mnemonic, mentioned in the opening crawl.
- Track Down, wherein a friend of Kevin Mitnick says in a club that he is the hacker known as "IceBreaker"

=== Television ===
- Babylon 5, in the episode "Born to the Purple"
- Max Headroom, in the episode "Security Systems", April 21, 1987

=== Video games ===
- Anarchy Online features an item called "Hacker ICE-Breaker Source", which can be further upgraded to "Intrusion Countermeasure Electronics Upgrade".
- AI: The Somnium Files
- Baldr Sky uses the term to describe the technology protecting the characters' "brain chips" and virtual structures.
- BloodNet uses the term to describe the technology the player must overcome when hacking a computer system.
- Cyberpunk 2077 uses the term to refer to defensive countermeasures that prevent netrunners and cyberware from hacking a target.
- Deus Ex, where the player's hacking program is referred to as an "ICE Breaker"
- Dystopia, wherein there are security programs called "ICE walls"
- Fallout 4 uses "Black Ice" as a construction material during a cyberspace hacking minigame in the Far Harbor DLC.
- Into The Grid uses the term to refer to the enemies the player will face during the card combat phase of the game.
- Mr. Robot, where "ICE" in its RPG part refers to shields or armor that can be attacked by various "ICE breaker"s
- Midnight Protocol, where "ICE" is an umbrella term for security measures that shield nodes from being accessed
- Neuromancer, where ICE, BlackICE, and ICE Breaking are highly featured.
- Perfect Dark Zero, where players use ICE technology to bypass security.
- Project Snowblind, features an ICE pick, to hack enemy cameras, turrets, and robots and use them against enemy forces.
- Ripper has the player break into various cyberspace systems, which involves fighting the "ICE" security programs in the form of a rail shooter.
- Star Wars: Knights of the Old Republic, an item called "ICE Breaker" can be obtained and used as a hacking tool during a sequence on the Leviathan, in which the player chooses one character to remain behind and attempt to rescue the other captured party members.
- StarCrawlers features an ability called Black Ice, which the Hacker character may use.
- System Shock, where ICE is represented in cyberspace as both autonomous security programs and ICE protection attached to data or software objects appearing as blue crystal formations.
- System Shock 2, where an item that auto-hacks electronics is known as an "ICE-Pick"
- The Ascent, where items are protected by various levels of ICE that the player must overcome to access.
- Invisible, Inc., wherein "ICE" is used intermittently with "firewalls" to reference mainframe defenses which the player-controlled AI program Incognita breaks through to take control of enemy electronics.
- Hackers, an in-game node called Black ICE helps recapture a node if it is hacked.

=== Web comics ===
- Schlock Mercenary, icewalls are a standard security measure.
