= Here at the Home =

Studio album by Tribe
- Released: March 16, 1990
- Recorded: 1987–1990
- Genre: Alternative rock, art rock
- Length: 39:47
- Label: Rutabaga Records
- Producer: Tribe

Tribe chronology
Tribe (EP) (1987)	Here at the Home (1990)	Abort (1991)

Professional ratings
Review scores
Source	Rating
AllMusic	2.5/5 stars

Here at the Home is the debut studio album by alternative rock band Tribe. The album was released on March 16, 1990, and was produced by the band themselves.

A single for "Jakpot" was released, containing a dance mix of the song.

The cassette tape version of the album included only the first six tracks. The last four tracks ("Abort", "Pinwheels", "Vigil", "Lemmings") were previously released in 1987 on their self-titled debut E.P., Tribe.

"Outside" is included in the music video game Rock Band as a playable track.

== Track listing ==
No.	Title	Writer(s)	Length
1.	"Daddy's Home"	Barous, LaValley	3:01
2.	"Rescue Me"	Barous, Brosius, LaValley	3:01
3.	"Jakpot"	LaValley, Barous	3:56
4.	"Here at the Home"	LoPiccolo	3:37
5.	"Tied"	Barous	4:17
6.	"Outside"	LoPiccolo	4:55
7.	"Pinwheels"	Barous, LoPiccolo	4:59
8.	"Vigil"	Barous, LaValley	4:21
9.	"Lemmings"	LoPiccolo	3:53
10.	"Abort"	Tribe	3:43

== Personnel ==
- Janet LaValley: vocals, rhythm guitar
- Terri Barous: keyboard, backing vocals
- Eric Brosius: lead guitar, backing vocals
- Greg LoPiccolo: bass, backing vocals
- David Penzo: drums, percussion
