= Sleeper (Tribe album) =

Studio album by Tribe
- Released: 1993
- Genre: Alternative rock
- Length: 43:12
- Label: Slash/Warner Bros.
- Producer: John Porter

Tribe chronology
Abort (1991)	Sleeper (1993)

Sleeper is the third and final studio album by the Boston alternative band Tribe, released in 1993.

The album was recorded and mixed at Blue Jay Recording Studio in Carlisle, Massachusetts, from December 1992 to January 1993.

The album yielded two singles, "Supercollider" and "Red Rover," the latter of which also yielded the band's second (and last) music video.

The band performed "Supercollider" on Late Night with Conan O'Brien in January 1994, marking the band's only ever national television appearance.

== Critical reception ==
Professional ratings
Review scores
Source	Rating
AllMusic	3/5 stars

The Boston Globe deemed the album "an uneven effort, hampered by an often poor sound mix in which Janet LaValley's ... vocals are mixed too low, muting her power and rendering many lyrics inaudible."

== Track listing ==
No.	Title	Writer(s)	Length
1.	"Miracle of Sound"	Barous, Brosius	3:17
2.	"Red Rover"	Barous, Brosius	3:44
3.	"Crawl"	Barous, Brosius	2:44
4.	"Supercollider"	LoPiccolo	4:06
5.	"Dogflower"	Barous, Brosius	3:01
6.	"Smile"	LoPiccolo	3:45
7.	"Making a Plan"	Barous, Brosius	3:27
8.	"Romeo Poe"	Barous, Brosius, LaValley	3:04
9.	"Nevermind"	Barous, Brosius	3:51
10.	"Mr. Lieber"	Barous, Brosius	3:26
11.	"Sleeper"	Barous, Brosius	3:42
12.	"Sing to Neptune"	Barous, LoPiccolo	4:58

== Personnel ==
- Janet LaValley: vocals, rhythm guitar
- Terri Brosius: keyboard, backing vocals (lead vocals on "Mr. Lieber")
- Eric Brosius: lead guitar, backing vocals
- Greg LoPiccolo: bass, backing vocals
- David Penzo: drums, percussion
