= Android (board game) =

2008 board game

- Players: 3 to 5
- Setup time: 30-60 minutes
- Playing time: 120-240 minutes
- Chance: Hard
- Age range: 13 and up

Android is an adventure board game designed by Kevin Wilson and Dan Clark, published in 2008 by Fantasy Flight Games. Set in a dystopian future, where the Moon is colonized and androids and clones are real, players take on the roles of murder investigators, investigating a murder within the fictional cities of New Angeles (a fictional future version of Los Angeles, but placed on the equator to accommodate a space elevator) and Heinlein, a colony on the Moon. Players attempt to gain Victory Points by solving the murder, solving the conspiracy, and/or resolving the investigators' personal issues. The player with the most Victory Points wins the game.

== Overview ==
There is a murder. The players' goal is to prove their murder suspect is the guilty party. The Gameboard is made up of locations in the city of New Angeles and Heinlein separated into districts. One of these districts is the space elevator also known as The Beanstalk. In addition, the top right of the Gameboard contains the conspiracy puzzle that players also attempt to solve. Players travel about the gameboard trying to obtain the playing-pieces representing leads (clues to the murder). Traveling is done with a vehicle template unique for each vehicle (travel is limited on The Beanstalk). Leads allow characters to place evidence on suspects or investigate the conspiracy. Each player has one of five unique investigators, each with their own starting items and personal plots. The game is won by the player with the most Victory Points at the end. Victory Points are determined by correctly determining guilty and innocent suspects based in players suspect cards, uncovering the conspiracy and resolving players' personal plots, or all of the above, giving each game a unique strategy to win.

== Gameplay ==
Each player chooses one of 5 unique characters: Louis Blaine, a crooked cop; Rachael Beckman, an in-debt bounty hunter; Floyd 2X3A7C, a Bioroid (a kind of android/cyborg) who is balancing his programming with his interest in humanity and his own attempts at "being human"; Caprice Nisei, a psychic clone who is trying to maintain her sanity and her knowledge of being a clone; and Ray Flint, a private investigator battling his inner demons of being a war veteran and addiction issues. Each player has a unique card or set of cards that each character has for the game (Example: Floyd has three Directive cards he must follow when playing, which represent his programming. In the course of play, he may be able to "humanize" himself and shed a Directive or two.)

Players then choose a murder (either randomly or by vote). Each murder has up to 6 suspects (one more than the number of players). Players are then dealt hunch cards: one hunch card for a guilty suspect and one of an innocent suspect. No player has the same guilty or innocent suspect as another player, though a player can have the same suspect as both his guilty and innocent hunch—making the investigator "obsessed" with that suspect—and the potential to win bonus Victory Points if the suspect is determined to be far more likely to be guilty than the others. Players then start at locations determined by their character.

=== Rounds ===
Play is divided into days. There are 12 total days to investigate the murder; at the end of 12 days, the murder is solved. Each day is split up into investigator actions called Time. Each investigator character can have up to 13 Time to perform actions, but most investigators start with 6 Time. In a single Time investigators could do one of several things. Players can move their investigators from place to place, and the maximum distance they can move in 1 Time is determined by the vehicle they have (there are unique movement rulers resembling callipers of somewhat different sizes for each vehicle). The exception is The Beanstalk, in which an investigator must navigate through 5 areas (representing the Beanstalk and space shuttle trips), using 1 Time for each area to move between the Earth and the Moon. Investigators can investigate the murder or conspiracy for 1 Time (by Following Up a lead). Players can play Light Cards to give their investigator various bonuses, if they spend 1 Time. They can Draw or Discard Twilight Cards for 1 Time. They can move their investigator to the murder scene and make that investigator the first player in the next round (Getting a Jump on the Case). Or they can use a location's ability or event-based actions for varying Time depending on the event/action.

=== Board areas ===
Areas are labeled with both colors and symbols, colors determining the type of area it is, and a symbol determining whether it is ritzy (diamond), normal (circle), or seedy (triangle). Entering a ritzy location allows a player to draw one of their Light Cards; entering a seedy location allows them to draw one of the other players' Dark Cards. There are also major locations that can help players acquire certain game items (Alibis, Hits, Dropship Passes, etc.). There are also major locations that have special abilities that players can use. Players move about the board by use of the vehicle rulers which are unique to each investigator giving them a movement value; by dropship passes which allow players to move anywhere on the board for 1 Time; or by traveling the 5-location Beanstalk which costs 1 Time per location.

=== Following up leads ===
A player moving into an area containing a lead can choose to investigate that lead (which takes one Time unit). Investigating leads give players two options. The first is placing evidence on suspects. Evidence consists of tile; one side of the tile is a standard blank back, the other side is a number ranging from -4 to +5. A player draws a face-down tile then places this evidence upon one of the suspects face-down. The higher the number, the more guilty a suspect becomes; the lower the number, the more innocent. Additionally, there are evidence tiles that contain Surprise Witnesses (blue faces) which are equal to -5 and Perjury tiles (red faces) that eliminate the benefit of a Surprise Witness or Alibi and add +5. At the end of the game, the score on each suspect is added up via the evidence on their suspect sheet; the evidence tiles total determines guilt or innocence.

Instead of placing evidence when following up a lead, a player can investigate the Conspiracy surrounding the murder. By doing this, a player can draw a piece of the "Conspiracy Puzzle" and place this puzzle tile within the Conspiracy area of the game board. Linking the puzzle tiles together via linkage lines on the tile links the Conspiracy to groups around the puzzle. Each link from one of the four sides of the central Conspiracy piece to a group gives Victory Point bonuses to all players who hold one of the four kinds of Favor pieces, successful Guilt or Innocence outcomes, or Happy or Sad endings to their plot lines.

There are 3 different piles of Conspiracy tiles, giving the character placing them Shifts (on their Twilight Track, see below), Favors, or Baggage (more on Baggage below), and other items. Players can forego drawing a Conspiracy tile in order "Dig Deeper," allowing their character to draw conspiracy tiles in the pile of the next higher value the next time they follow a Lead. Higher-value Conspiracy tiles therefore cost a greater number of followed Leads and will not be readily available to players early in the game. A player may choose not to play a tile (and in some cases a tile might not be able to legally fit anywhere in the puzzle), in which case the tile is discarded but the player still earns all items and bonuses shown on both sides.

Once evidence is followed up, the player to the right of the investigating player moves that evidence to a new location. This can constantly change a player's ability to win the game. The new location must not be in this player's current "district", must not already have an evidence piece, and must be of the same color-coded building type as where it was first found (civic, religious, residential, business, or nightlife).

=== Twilight Cards ===
Each investigator has two unique decks of Twilight Cards: Light Cards and Dark Cards. Players are not allowed to draw their own investigator's Dark Cards. Players play their investigator's Light Cards for one Time during their turn, and their opponents can play the investigator's Dark Cards while that investigator is taking their turn. Light Cards are generally good events that can happen to the investigator, while Dark Cards are bad events. The other Investigators do not actually instigate bad events on a rival Investigator; the bad events are mainly caused by impersonal forces or non-player characters. Each player has a Twilight Track on their investigator card which has 5 positions. As Light and Dark Cards are played, characters shift from light to dark and move a Twilight Marker back and forth on the Twilight Track. Dark Cards move the Twilight Marker toward the lighter side of the chart, Light Cards move it toward the dark side. There is a constant balancing act to playing Light and Dark Cards.

If a player does not have enough spaces on the Twilight Track to move in order to pay for the point cost of a card, they may also discard any Light or Dark cards to decrease the cost of the card by one point per card discarded. If a player plays a card which matches the color of the Plot Card currently on the investigator, they may decrease OR increase the cost of the card by one point. The motivation to increase the cost of playing one's card by 1 Shift has to do with easing the cost of an opposite type of card played in the future, by allowing greater room to Shift in the opposite direction.

=== Getting a jump on the case ===
A game round begins with the chosen First Player, and then goes clockwise among the remaining players. There are distinct advantages to being the First Player, who remains the First Player from round to round unless another player makes a deliberate change. By visiting the scene of the murder and spending one Time, a player makes themselves the First Player for the next round (the remaining players following clockwise.)

=== Plot cards ===
Each player also has a Plot for each week randomly chosen (with some exceptions for certain Investigators) from a pile of Plot Cards unique to each character. Players try to accumulate Good Baggage on their Plots, while opponents look for opportunities to place Bad Baggage on the player's Plots with Dark Cards or other abilities. At the end of three game days, Plots are determined to have ended well or badly (if the total number of Baggage is negative or zero, the Plot ends badly; if the total number of Baggage is positive, the Plot ends well). They then move on to the second half of the Plot (selecting the new Plot Card as directed). At the end of the 6th day of that week, Plots are resolved, and a player can earn Victory Points (or negative Victory Points) depending upon how the Plots resolve ("Happy Endings" or "Sad Endings"). For example, one of Louis's Plots deals with his failing marriage, and it could resolve in a number of ways, from him and his wife reconciling, his wife getting pregnant, or even a divorce or his wife getting killed.

=== End of the day ===
After each player takes his turn, the round ends. Either plots resolve (on Day 3, 6, 9, 12) or a General Event Card is drawn. On the beginning of Day 7 a Murder-Specific Event card is drawn. These events do a number of things, from changing a game mechanic, to putting an extra goal into play, to placing one of the character's acquaintances (a non-player character) on the board to accomplish a special function, or changing the murder situation entirely.

=== Victory conditions ===
At the end of the game, a murderer is determined by the suspect who has the highest point total of evidence. This earns the investigator with the correct Guilty hunch 15 Victory Points. Innocent hunches gain 5 Victory points. Various Victory Points are earned throughout the Conspiracy Puzzle and Plots so you do not necessarily have to get your Guilty hunch right to win the game. The player with the most Victory Points wins.

== Game mechanics and winning ==
Unlike many games of this genre, there are no dice involved in the game. The game is determined by card play, and your ability to accumulate Victory Points in various ways. Some of the characters in the game are "better" at uncovering the Conspiracy, and gain more points and better game benefits by doing so. Some are better at solving the murder, and some are better at solving their particular Plot lines. This leaves a lot of different strategies to win the game, and solving the murder is not a guarantee you will win the game. Players attempting to balance both solving the murder, and solving the Conspiracy while trying to find out their opponents' hunches, throwing them off, and forcing them into bad Plot Endings generally win. Because of this the game is very replayable, and very open to future expansions. No character has an optimal way to win a game, because of the element of plots, which can change how to play a character, and the element of players playing Dark Cards against you. Players can also place hits on suspects to kill them, place Alibis on suspects, and some Twilight cards allow players to move around the leads on suspects, messing up an opponent's strategy. In addition, leads are constantly being moved around the board, forcing players to travel between Earth and the Moon and adjusting priorities and strategies.

Because there are three separate mechanisms to gain Victory Points: resolving the murder, Plot Cards, and the Conspiracy Puzzle, it may be difficult for players to assess their relative standing at any point during the game.

The game presents certain limitations which may frustrate new players. The murder is abstract; the "true" murderer is not definitely determined such as in a game of Clue. Investigators are seeking to prove their hunches and may even actively frame an innocent suspect. The connection between the murderer and the leads are not developed. This may possibly be justified by the cynical cyberpunk game-setting; by the fact that Investigators are credited in their employment for results, not necessarily truthful results; or the fact that the murder case is not the only focus of actions (similar to many police television shows where the personal lives of characters are dealt with as well). In a similar way, the Conspiracy aspect is abstract and presents no clear plot line as to why the influential groups wanted the murder victim killed. Possibly the full motivations are unknowable or covered up by outside pressures by these groups on the police force, again in the cyberpunk tradition.

== Spin-offs ==
Fantasy Flight Games has also released other games in the Android universe: Android: Infiltration, Android: Mainframe, New Angeles, and the reissue of the 2-player collectible card game Netrunner (originally by Wizards of the Coast, 1996, and set in the Cyberpunk 2020 universe), called Android: Netrunner.
