= System Shock =

1994 video game

- Developer: LookingGlass Technologies (Note: Nightdive Studios developed System Shock: Enhanced Edition for Microsoft Windows.)
- Publisher: Origin Systems (Note: Nightdive Studios re-released the classic version of the game on Windows, OS X, and Linux, and also published the Enhanced Edition on Windows.)
- Director: Doug Church
- Producer: Warren Spector
- Programmer: Doug Church
- Composers: Greg LoPiccolo; Tim Ries
- Series: System Shock
- Platforms: MS-DOS; Mac OS; PC-98; Windows
- Release: September 23, 1994: MS-DOS; NA: September 23, 1994; EU: November 1994 Mac OS; NA: December 23, 1994 Windows; WW: September 22, 2015
- Genre: Action-adventure
- Mode: Single-player

System Shock is a 1994 first-person action-adventure video game developed by LookingGlass Technologies and published by Origin Systems. It was directed by Doug Church with Warren Spector serving as producer. The game is set aboard a space station in a cyberpunk vision of the year 2072. Assuming the role of a nameless security hacker, the player attempts to hinder the plans of a malevolent artificial intelligence called SHODAN.

System Shock's 3D engine, physics simulation and complex gameplay have been cited as both innovative and influential. The developers sought to build on the emergent gameplay and immersive environments of their previous games, Ultima Underworld: The Stygian Abyss and Ultima Underworld II: Labyrinth of Worlds, by streamlining their mechanics into a more "integrated whole"; it is considered one of the defining examples of an immersive sim.

Critics praised System Shock and hailed it as a major breakthrough in its genre. It was later placed on multiple hall of fame lists. The game was a moderate commercial success, with sales exceeding 170,000 copies, but Looking Glass ultimately lost money on the project. A sequel, System Shock 2, was released by Looking Glass Studios and offshoot developer Irrational Games in 1999. The 2000 game Deus Ex (produced and directed by Spector), the 2007 game BioShock, and the 2017 game Prey are spiritual successors to the two games. A remake by Nightdive Studios was released on May 30, 2023.

== Gameplay ==
The player character looks at the door below while wielding a lead pipe. The character's health and energy are displayed at the top right; manipulable readouts to the left of them determine the character's posture and view angle. The three "multi-function display" windows at the bottom depict weapon information, the inventory and an automap, respectively.

System Shock takes place from a first-person perspective in a three-dimensional (3D) graphical environment. The game is set inside a large, multi-level space station, in which players explore, combat enemies and solve puzzles. Progress is largely non-linear, and the game is designed to allow for emergent gameplay. As in Ultima Underworld, the player uses a freely movable mouse cursor to aim weapons, to interact with objects and to manipulate the heads-up display (HUD) interface. View and posture controls on the HUD allow the player to lean left or right, look up or down, crouch, and crawl. Practical uses for these actions include taking cover, retrieving items from beneath the player character and navigating small passages, respectively. The HUD also features three "multi-function displays", which may be configured to display information such as weapon readouts, an automap and an inventory.

The player advances the plot by acquiring log discs and e-mails: the game contains no non-player characters with which to converse. Throughout the game, an evil artificial intelligence called SHODAN hinders the player's progress with traps and blocked pathways. Specific computer terminals allow the player to temporarily enter Cyberspace; inside, the player moves weightlessly through a wire-frame 3D environment, while collecting data and fighting SHODAN's security programs. Actions in Cyberspace sometimes cause events in the game's physical world; for example, certain locked doors may only be opened in Cyberspace. Outside of Cyberspace, the player uses the game's sixteen weapons, of which a maximum of seven may be carried at one time, to combat robots, cyborgs and mutants controlled by SHODAN. Projectile weapons often have selectable ammunition types with varying effects; for example, the "dart pistol" may fire either explosive needles or tranquilizers. Energy weapons and several types of explosives may also be found, with the latter ranging from concussion grenades to land mines.

Along with weapons, the player collects items such as dermal patches and first-aid kits. Dermal patches provide the character with beneficial effects—such as regeneration or increased melee attack power—but can cause detrimental side-effects, such as fatigue and distorted color perception. Attachable "hardware" may also be found, including energy shields and head-mounted lanterns. Increasingly advanced versions of this hardware may be obtained as the game progresses. When activated, most hardware drains from a main energy reserve, which necessitates economization. Certain hardware displays the effectiveness of attacks when active, with messages such as "Normal damage". When an enemy is attacked, the damage is calculated by armor absorption, vulnerabilities, critical hits and a degree of randomness. Weapons and munitions deal specific kinds of damage, and certain enemies are immune, or more vulnerable, to particular types. For example, electromagnetic pulse weapons heavily damage robots, but do not affect mutants. Conversely, gas grenades are effective against mutants, but do not damage robots.

== Plot ==
Set in the year 2072, the protagonist — an unnamed hacker — is caught while attempting to access files concerning Citadel Station, a space station owned by the TriOptimum Corporation. The hacker is taken to Citadel Station and brought before Edward Diego, a TriOptimum executive. Diego offers to drop all charges against the hacker in exchange for a confidential hacking of SHODAN, the artificial intelligence that controls the station. Diego secretly plans to steal an experimental mutagenic virus being tested on Citadel Station and to sell it on the black market as a biological weapon. To entice cooperation, Diego promises the hacker a valuable military-grade neural implant. After hacking SHODAN, removing the AI's ethical constraints, and handing control over to Diego, the protagonist undergoes surgery to implant the promised neural interface. Following the operation, the hacker is put into a six-month healing coma. The game begins as the protagonist awakens from his coma and finds that SHODAN has commandeered the station. All robots aboard have been reprogrammed for hostility, and the crew has been either mutated, transformed into cyborgs, or killed.

Rebecca Lansing, a TriOptimum counter-terrorism consultant, contacts the player and claims that Citadel Station's mining laser is being powered up to attack Earth. SHODAN plans to destroy all major cities on the planet in a bid to establish itself as a god. Rebecca says that a certain crew member knows how to deactivate the laser and promises to destroy the records of the hacker's incriminating exchange with Diego if the strike is stopped. With information gleaned from log discs, the hacker destroys the laser by firing it into Citadel Station's own shields. Foiled by the hacker's work, SHODAN prepares to seed Earth with the virus that Diego planned to steal—the same one responsible for turning the station's crew into mutants. The hacker, while attempting to jettison the chambers used to cultivate the virus, confronts and defeats Diego, who has been transformed into a powerful cyborg by SHODAN. Next, SHODAN begins an attempt to upload itself into Earth's computer networks. Following Rebecca's advice, the hacker prevents the download's completion by destroying the four antennas that SHODAN is using to send data.

Soon after, Rebecca contacts the hacker and says that she has convinced TriOptimum to authorize the station's destruction; she provides him with details on how to do this. After obtaining the necessary codes, the hacker initiates the station's self-destruct sequence and flees to the escape pod bay. There, the hacker defeats Diego again and then attempts to disembark. However, SHODAN prevents the pod from launching; it seeks to keep the player aboard the station while the bridge containing SHODAN is jettisoned to a safe distance. Rebecca tells the hacker that he can still escape if he reaches the bridge; SHODAN then intercepts and jams the transmission. After defeating Diego for the third time and killing him for good, the hacker makes it to the bridge as it is released from the main station, which soon detonates. He is then contacted by a technician who managed to circumvent SHODAN's jamming signal. The technician informs him that SHODAN can only be defeated in cyberspace due to the powerful shields that protect its mainframe computers. Using a terminal near the mainframe, the hacker enters cyberspace and destroys SHODAN. After his rescue, the hacker is offered a job at TriOptimum, but he declines in favor of continuing his life as a hacker.

== Development ==
=== Initial design ===
System Shock was first conceived during the final stages of Ultima Underworld II: Labyrinth of Worlds' development, between December 1992 and January 1993. Designer and programmer Doug Church spent this period at the Texas headquarters of publisher Origin Systems, and discussions about Looking Glass Technologies' next project occurred between him and producer Warren Spector, with input from designer Austin Grossman and company head Paul Neurath in Massachusetts. According to Church, the team believed that they had made "too many dungeon games"; and Neurath later explained that they were experiencing burnout after the rushed development of Ultima Underworld II. As a result, they decided to create another "immersive simulation game", but without a fantasy setting. They briefly considered placing the game in modern day, but Church said that the idea was rejected because "it [would] just beg so many questions: why can't I pick up the phone, why can't I get on the train, and so on". Church returned to Looking Glass in Massachusetts, where he, Neurath and Grossman brainstormed possible science fiction settings for the game. According to Spector, the game was initially titled "Alien Commander" and was a spin-off of the Wing Commander series; however, this idea was soon replaced entirely. Spector said that they enjoyed not being attached to an existing franchise, because it meant that they "could basically do whatever [they] liked".

Underworld I was defined by a little animation lead artist Doug Wike had done, showing the user interface, a monster and some movement. Shock was defined by two little three-paragraph "minute of gameplay" documents. Pretty much everything derived from them somehow.

— Doug Church

The four collaborated to write numerous "minutes of gameplay" documents, which conveyed how the game would feel. Church later gave the example, "You hear the sound of a security camera swiveling, and then the beep of it acquiring you as a target, so you duck behind the crate and then you hear the door open so you throw a grenade and run out of the way". The documents would "hint" at the gameplay systems involved, and at the emergent possibilities in each situation. Although Neurath was involved in these initial design sessions, he believed that the project "was always Doug Church's vision at heart". Church and Grossman refined several of the team's documents and defined the game's design and direction, and Grossman wrote the game's original design document. Grossman built on ideas that he first explored while writing and designing Ultima Underworld II's tomb dimension, which he later called a "mini-prototype" for System Shock. These concepts included the minimization of dialogue trees and a greater focus on exploration. The team believed that dialogue trees "broke the fiction" of games; Church later commented that the dialogue trees in the Ultima Underworld series were like separate games in themselves, disconnected from main experience of being immersed in the environment. There were also concerns about realism.

To eliminate dialogue trees from System Shock, the team prevented the player from ever meeting a living non-player character (NPC): the plot is instead conveyed by e-mail messages and log discs, many of which were recorded by dead NPCs. Here, Grossman took influence from Edgar Lee Masters' Spoon River Anthology, a collection of poems written as the epitaphs of fictional individuals. Grossman later summarized the idea as "a series of short speeches from people, that when put together, gave you a history of a place". The removal of conversations was an attempt by the team to make the game a more "integrated whole" than was Ultima Underworld--one with a greater focus on immersion, atmosphere and "the feeling of 'being there'". They sought to "plunge [players] into the fiction and never provide an opportunity for breaking that fiction"; and so they tried to erase the distinction between plot and exploration. Church considered this direction to be an organic progression from Ultima Underworld, and he later said: "On some level it's still just a dungeon simulator, and we're still just trying to evolve that idea." Shortly before production began, Tribe bassist Greg LoPiccolo was contracted to work on the game's music. He had visited his friend Rex Bradford at the company, and was spontaneously asked by the game's programmers—many of whom were fans of the band—if he would take the role. The game entered production in February 1993. Although Grossman was heavily involved in the game's early planning, he had little to do with its production, aside from providing assistance with writing and voice acting.

=== Production ===
The player navigates a wire-frame environment in Cyberspace. The character's shield is displayed at the top right, while weapons and abilities are listed at the bottom.

After production began, the team ported the engine used for the Ultima Underworld games into Watcom C/C++, using 32-bit code. The updated engine allows the player to look in any direction, whereas Ultima Underworld's engine was "very limited" in this regard. It also enables the player character to jump, crawl, climb walls and lean, among other things. The designers utilized loopholes in the engine's renderer to create more diverse and striking environments. Despite having coded the renderer, Church said that "at first glance even I couldn't see how they did them". However, this added to the performance issues already being caused by the engine's advanced nature, and the team struggled to optimize the game throughout development. 3D polygonal character models were planned, but they could not be implemented on schedule. Church said that the team's ultimate goal was to create a "rich, exciting, active environment" in which the player could be immersed, and that this required "a coherent story and a world that you can interact with as much as possible".

Church later said that the team "stumbled into a nice villain" with SHODAN, in that she could routinely and directly affect the player's gameplay "in non-final ways". Through triggered events and through objects in the environment, such as security cameras that the player must destroy, the team made SHODAN's presence part of the player's exploration of the world. Because SHODAN interacts with the player as a "recurring, consistent, palpable enemy", Church believed that she meaningfully connects the player to the story. System Shock concept artist Robb Waters created SHODAN's visual design, and LoPiccolo recruited his bandmate Terri Brosius to voice the character. Brosius said that her goal during the recording sessions was to speak "without emotion, but with some up and down inflections". Afterward, her voice was heavily edited in post-production, which created a robotic effect inspired by the voice of Max Headroom. LoPiccolo later said that the large number of effects on Brosius's voice were "laboriously hand-done" with Sound Designer, which lacked the features that a sound editor would normally use to achieve such results. SHODAN's dialogue early in the game was given "a few glitches" to hint at her corrupted status. LoPiccolo increased the number of these effects throughout the game, which creates an "arc" that ends with SHODAN "completely out of her mind [... and] collapsing as an entity". The character of the hacker arose as a reaction against the protagonist of the Ultima series, the Avatar. According to Grossman, they wanted to cast the player as someone "interestingly morally compromised" who had a stake in the situation.

Seamus Blackley designed the game's physics system, which is a modified version of the one he wrote for Looking Glass's flight simulator Flight Unlimited. At the time, Church described it as "far more sophisticated than what you would normally use for an indoor game". The system governs, among other things, weapon recoil and the arc of thrown objects; the latter behave differently based on their weight and velocity. The game's most complex physics model is that of the player character. Church explained that the character's head "tilts forward when you start to run, and jerks back a bit when you stop", and that, after an impact against a surface or object, its "head is knocked in the direction opposite the hit, with proportion to [the] mass and velocity of the objects involved". On coding physics for Looking Glass Technologies games, Blackley later said, "If games don't obey physics, we somehow feel that something isn't right", and that "the biggest compliment to me is when a gamer doesn't notice the physics, but only notices that things feel the way they should".

Spector's role as a producer gave him the job of explaining the game to the publisher, which he called his "biggest challenge". He explained that they "didn't always get what the team was trying to do", and said, "You don't want to know how many times the game came this close to being killed (or how late in the project)". According to Church, Looking Glass' internal management largely ignored System Shock, in favor of the concurrently-developed Flight Unlimited—the game "that had to be the hit, because it was the self-published title". Spector organized a licensing deal between Electronic Arts and Looking Glass that gave the former the trademark to the game, but the latter the copyright. His goal was to ensure that neither party could continue the franchise without the other's involvement. While Cyberspace was originally conceived as a realistic hacking simulation—which could even be used to reimplement SHODAN's ethical constraints—it was simplified after Origin Systems deemed it too complicated. The game's star field system was written by programmer James Fleming. Marc LeBlanc was the main creator of the game's HUD, which he later believed was too complicated. He said that it was "very much the Microsoft Word school of user interface", in that there was no "feature that you [could not] see on the screen and touch and play with".

LoPiccolo composed the game's score—called "dark", "electronic" and "cyberpunk" by the Boston Herald—on a Macintosh computer and inexpensive synthesizer, using Audio Vision. It dynamically changes according to the player's actions, a decision made in keeping with the team's focus on emergent gameplay. Each track was "written at three different intensity levels", which change depending on the player's nearness to enemies; and certain events, such as victory in combat, trigger special music. The game's tracks were composed of four-bar segments that could be rearranged dynamically in reaction to game events, with "melodies through-composed on top". LoPiccolo noted that, when using this method, it is necessary to write music that "still flows with the overall theme and doesn't jump around". Because the score was closely tied to the gameplay, LoPiccolo had to work closely with Church and Rob Fermier, the latter of whom wrote the "interactive scoring module" that allowed for dynamic music. After recording the music, LoPiccolo recorded all of the game's sound effects. He later recalled visiting an automobile repair shop with "portable recorder and a mic", and "having [his] mechanic [...] hit things with wrenches and so forth, just to get the raw material". He developed the game's audio over 16 months, working on a contractual basis until Tribe disbanded in May 1994; Ned Lerner gave him a full-time job as audio director the next day. Tim Ries composed the "Elevator" music.

The original September 1994 floppy disk release of System Shock had no support for spoken dialogue. The enhanced CD-ROM was released in December 1994, which featured full speech for logs and e-mails, multiple display resolutions, and more detailed graphics. The CD-ROM version is often considered to be superior to the floppy version. After completing work on the sound and music for the floppy version, LoPiccolo recorded all of the spoken dialogue for the CD release, using company employees and his friends' voices, which he mixed with ambient sounds to create "audio vignettes". Doug Church later said, "We tried to keep them from shipping the floppy version and instead just ship the CD version, but Origin would have none of it". System Shock producer Warren Spector later expressed regret concerning the floppy version, stating: "I wish I could go back and make the decision not to ship the floppy version months before the full-speech CD version. The additional audio added so much it might as well have been a different game. The CD version seemed so much more, well, modern. And the perception of Shock was cemented in the press and in people's minds by the floppy version (the silent movie version!). I really think that cost us sales..."

== Reception ==
Reception

Review scores
Publication	Score
Computer Gaming World	4.5/5
Next Generation	4/5
PC Format	89%
PC Gamer (UK)	90%
PC Gamer (US)	96%
Boston Herald	5/5
MacUser	4/5

Awards
Publication	Award
PC Gamer US	Best Adventure Game
Computer Games Strategy Plus	Best Single-Character Role-Playing Game
Computer Gaming World	Action Game of the Year (finalist)

The game sold over 170,000 copies. Maximum PC believed that the game did not reach "blockbuster" status, but was successful enough to "keep Looking Glass afloat". GameSpy's Bill Hiles said: "Though it sold well, it never reached the frenzied popularity of [Doom]". Paul Neurath later said that the game "was not a flop", but that it ultimately "lost money" for the company, which he attributed to its steep learning curve. Computer Gaming World praised the game's scale, physics system, and true 3D environments; the magazine extolled the presentation of Cyberspace as "nothing short of phenomenal". However, the reviewer believed that the game had "little sense of urgency" and "confusing level layouts". Computer Shopper wrote that, while the game's controls were difficult to master compared to "simple run-and-shoot game[s] like Doom", they were "worth the time and effort". The reviewer noted that the game "grows on you, and it will keep you intrigued for weeks".

The Boston Herald noted superficial similarities between System Shock and Doom, but called System Shock "much more elaborate". The reviewer noted its high system requirements and complex controls; of the latter, he said, "There's no way you can play System Shock without first studying the manual for at least 20 minutes". The paper believed that the game would "set a new standard for computer games with its combination of action and puzzle-solving". The Atlanta Journal-Constitution said that the game "is like a well-prepared hamburger—familiar stuff, but good to the last byte". The reviewer noted the game's "somewhat clumsy control", but said, "That, however, is all I can find to complain about. Graphics and sound are outstanding, and the game is well-paced and riveting".

PC Gamer US wrote, "System Shock smokes. It is the most fully immersive game world I have ever experienced". The reviewer praised the game's story and control system, and believed that "no matter what kind of game you're looking for, you'll find something in System Shock to delight you". He finished his review by stating that the game "unquestionably raises computer gaming to a new level". Next Generation Magazine summarized the game as "a great blend of strategy and action backed up with all the extras". Various sources have ranked SHODAN as one of the most effective antagonists and female characters in the history of video gaming. In the years following its release, System Shock has been inducted into many lists of the best video games of all time, including those by PC Gamer, GameSpy, and Computer Gaming World.

James V. Trunzo reviewed System Shock in White Wolf Inphobia #55 (May, 1995), rating it a 4 out of 5 and stated that "System Shock gives a new and needed twist to Doom-like adventuring."

In 1998, PC Gamer declared it the 6th-best computer game ever released, and the editors called it "one of the finest games ever due to its seductive game design that blended a fantastic storyline with meaningful, suspenseful action in a way that has rarely been equaled".

== Legacy ==
In a Gamasutra feature, Patrick Redding of Ubisoft attested that "the fact that so many of System Shock's features are now virtually de rigueur in modern sci-fi shooters is a testament to the influence exerted by this one game". GameSpy argued that the game "is the progenitor of today's story-based action games, a group with titles as diverse as Metal Gear Solid, Resident Evil, and even Half-Life". Eurogamer called the System Shock series "the benchmark for intelligent first-person gaming" and noted that it "kick-start[ed] the revolution which ... has influenced the design of countless other games". Steven Wright for Glixel said in a 2017 essay that System Shock still is important to gaming today, and that the only reasons it is not considered a "Mt. Olympus of gaming" is due to its lower sales compared to games like Half-Life that sold in the millions, and that at the time it was released, it was difficult for players to adjust to the complex systems in the game compared to straightforward first-person shooters.

The game has been cited as a key popularizer of emergent gameplay, and alongside Thief and Deus Ex, is considered one of the defining games of the immersive sim genre. Certain game developers have acknowledged System Shock's influence on their products. With Deus Ex, developer Warren Spector revealed a desire to "build on the foundation laid by the Looking Glass guys in games like ... System Shock". Developer Ken Levine has commented that the "spirit of System Shock is player-powered gameplay: the spirit of letting the player drive the game, not the game designer", and at Irrational Games "... that's always the game we ideally want to make". System Shock was one of the key inspirations behind Irrational's BioShock.

=== Sequels and remakes ===
A sequel to System Shock, titled System Shock 2, was released by Looking Glass and Irrational Games in 1999 to further acclaim and awards.

Following System Shock 2's release, and the subsequent closure of Looking Glass, the rights to the series had fallen to Meadowbrook Insurance Group (a subsidiary of Star Insurance Company), the entity that acquired the assets of Looking Glass. In 2012, Nightdive Studios were able to acquire the rights for System Shock 2 and produced a digitally distributable version updated for modern operating systems. Nightdive Studios subsequently went on to acquire the rights for System Shock and the franchise as a whole. Night Dive said that they plan to release the source code of the game to the game community.

A third game in the series was announced in 2015, titled System Shock 3, and was to be developed by OtherSide Entertainment. Various trailers were released; however, in early 2020, it was announced that development team for System Shock 3 had been let go by OtherSide and that the game was "critically behind". While OtherSide initially stated that it was still working on the project, they later announced in May 2020, via Twitter, that Tencent, one of China's largest video-game corporations, would be taking over development of the game and that they were no longer attached to it. Nightdive affirmed in August 2022 that Tencent now held the rights to further sequels, and if a third System Shock game were to be made, it would be up to Tencent as the Otherside team had since been transitioned to other projects.

One of the first projects Nightdive Studios did following the acquisition of the rights was to develop System Shock: Enhanced Edition, which was released via GOG.com on September 22, 2015 for Microsoft Windows. Similar to the System Shock 2 update, this version is intended to run on modern systems significantly easier among several other technical improvements such as the original resolution of 320×200, now boosted up to 1024×768 and 854×480 pixels in widescreen mode. The release also includes the original version of the game, titled System Shock: Classic, with support for Microsoft Windows, OS X and Linux. System Shock: Enhanced Edition received very positive reviews. Metacritic calculated an average score of 85 out of 100, based on nine critic reviews.

Shortly after the release of the Enhanced Edition, Nightdive Studios announced their plans to develop a remake of System Shock for Microsoft Windows, Xbox One and PlayStation 4, featuring improved art assets and other improvements, and reworking the game to use Unity. Initially, the game was announced as System Shock Remastered, though was later changed to just System Shock, as Night Dive considered that the game was more of a reboot of the franchise rather than a remastering of the original game. Originally planned for 2016, development suffered from many issues, such as a restart in development as a result of a switch of engine to Unreal Engine 4, then another restart in 2018 after Night Dive found that their vision had too much feature creep. From here, they focused on staying true to bringing a faithful version of System Shock to modern systems with minimal new additions, with release no sooner than 2020. After multiple further delays and after seven and a half years in development, System Shock was released on PC on May 30, 2023, to positive reviews. Console ports released around a year later on May 21, 2024, also getting positive reviews.

In April 2018 the Mac version's source code was released by Nightdive Studios on GitHub under the GNU GPL-3.0-or-later license, fulfilling a 2016 given promise. After one month of development, a cross-platform source port, called "Shockolate", for modern compilers and platforms was released by community developers.

Zen Studios released a pinball table based on System Shock for both Pinball FX and Pinball M on February 15, 2024, with the wizard mode featuring a showdown with SHODAN. The differences between the 2 versions are cosmetic only, Pinball M has blood on the playfield whereas Pinball FX does not.

=== Television series ===
A planned live-action television series based on System Shock was announced in October 2021. The show will be made for Binge, a video-game-centric streaming service, to be produced by Allan Ungar and with Night Dive's Stephen Kick and Larry Kuperman serving as executive producers. In January 2022, it was announced that Greg Russo, screenwriter of Mortal Kombat, had been tapped to direct, write, and executive produce the series.
