= System Shock 2 =

1999 video game

- Developers: Irrational Games; Looking Glass Studios (Note: Nightdive Studios developed the 25th Anniversary Remaster.)
- Publisher: Electronic Arts (Note: Nightdive Studios published the 25th Anniversary Remaster.)
- Producer: Josh Randall
- Designer: Ken Levine
- Programmer: Rob Fermier
- Artist: Gareth Hinds
- Writer: Ken Levine
- Composers: Eric Brosius; Ramin Djawadi; Josh Randall
- Series: System Shock
- Engine: Dark Engine (Note: The 25th Anniversary Remaster uses the KEX Engine.)
- Platforms: Windows; OS X; Linux; Nintendo Switch; PlayStation 4; PlayStation 5; Xbox One; Xbox Series X/S; Nintendo Switch 2
- Release: August 11, 1999: Windows; NA: August 11, 1999; UK: September 18, 1999 OS X; WW: June 18, 2013 Linux; WW: April 1, 2014; 25th Anniversary Remaster; Windows; WW: June 26, 2025 NS, PS4, PS5, XBO, XSX/S; WW: July 10, 2025 Switch 2; WW: June 3, 2026
- Genres: Action role-playing, first-person shooter, survival horror
- Modes: Single-player, multiplayer

System Shock 2 is a 1999 action role-playing and survival horror video game designed by Ken Levine and co-developed by Irrational Games and Looking Glass Studios. Originally intended to be a standalone title, its story was changed during production into a sequel to the 1994 game System Shock. The alterations were made when Electronic Arts—who owned the System Shock franchise rights—signed on as publisher.

The game takes place on board a starship in a cyberpunk depiction of 2114. The player assumes the role of a soldier trying to stem the outbreak of a genetic infection that has devastated the ship. Like System Shock, gameplay consists of first-person combat and exploration. It incorporates role-playing elements, in which the player can develop skills and traits, such as hacking and psionic abilities.

System Shock 2 was originally released in August 1999 for Microsoft Windows. The game received critical acclaim but failed to meet commercial sales expectations. Many critics later determined that the game was highly influential in subsequent game design, particularly on first-person shooters, and considered it far ahead of its time. It has been included in several greatest games of all time lists. In 2007, Irrational Games released a spiritual successor to the System Shock series, titled BioShock, to critical acclaim and strong sales.

System Shock 2 had been in intellectual property limbo following the closure of Looking Glass Studios. Nightdive Studios were able to secure the rights to the game and the System Shock franchise in 2013 to release an updated version of System Shock 2 for modern operating systems, including for OS X and Linux, and released a 25th anniversary remaster of the game in 2025. OtherSide Entertainment announced in 2015 that they had acquired the rights from Nightdive Studios to produce a sequel, System Shock 3, but as of 2020 the rights have since been transferred to Tencent.

== Gameplay ==
The player, armed with a pistol, faces a protocol droid while in the interface mode. The inventory is at the top; health, psionic points, nanites, and cyber modules are at the bottom left; and the cyber interface and weapon information are at the bottom right.

As in its predecessor, System Shock, gameplay in System Shock 2 is an amalgamation of the action role-playing game and survival horror genres. The developers achieved this gameplay design by rendering the experience as a standard first-person shooter and adding a character customization and development system, which are considered signature role-playing elements. The player uses melee and projectile weapons to defeat enemies, while the role-playing system allows the development of useful abilities. Navigation is presented from a first-person view and complemented with a heads-up display that shows character and weapon information, a map, and a drag and drop inventory.

The backstory is explained progressively through the player's acquisition of audio logs and encounters with ghostly apparitions. At the beginning of the game, the player chooses a career in a branch of the Unified National Nominate, a fictional military organization. Each branch of service gives the player a set of starting bonuses composed of certain skills, though may thereafter freely develop as the player chooses. The Marine begins with bonuses to weaponry, the Navy officer is skilled in repairing and hacking, and the OSA agent gets a starting set of psionic powers.

The player can upgrade their skills by using "cyber-modules" given as rewards for completing objectives such as searching the ship and spend them at devices called "cyber-upgrade units" to obtain enhanced skills. Operating system (O/S) units allow one-time character upgrades to be made (e.g. permanent health enhancement). An in-game currency called "nanites" may be spent on items at vending machines, including ammunition supplies and health packs. "Quantum Bio-Reconstruction Machines" can be activated and reconstitute the player for 10 nanites if they die inside the area in which the machine resides. Otherwise, the game ends and progress must be resumed from a save point. The player can hack devices, such as keypads to open alternate areas and vending machines to reduce prices. When a hack is attempted, a minigame begins that features a grid of green nodes; the player must connect three in a straight row to succeed. Optionally, electronic lock picks, called "ICE-picks", can be found that will automatically hack a machine, regardless of its difficulty.

Throughout the game, the player can procure various weapons, including melee weapons, pistols, shotguns, and alien weapons. Non-melee weapons degrade with use and will break if they are not regularly repaired with maintenance tools. There are a variety of ammunition types, each of which is most damaging to a specific enemy. For example, organic enemies are vulnerable to anti-personnel rounds, while mechanical foes are weak against armour-piercing rounds. Similarly, energy weapons cause the most damage against robots and cyborgs, and the annelid-made exotic weaponry is particularly harmful to organic targets. Because ammunition is scarce, to be effective the player must use it sparingly and carefully search rooms for supplies.

The game includes a research function. When new objects are encountered in the game, especially enemies, their organs can be collected; when combined with chemicals found in storage rooms, the player can research the enemies and thus improve their damage against them. Similarly, some exotic weapons and items can only be used after being researched. OSA agents effectively have a separate weapons tree available to them. Psionic powers, such as invisibility, fireballs, and teleportation, can be learned.

== Plot ==
=== Backstory ===
In 2072, after the Citadel Station's demise in System Shock, TriOptimum's attempts to cover up the incident were exposed to the media, and the corporation was brought up on charges from multiple individuals and companies for the ensuing scandal. The virus developed there killed the station's population; the ruthless malevolent AI supercomputer named SHODAN controlled the Citadel Station in hopes of enslaving and destroying humanity. After a large number of trials, the company went bankrupt, and its operations were shut down. The United Nations Nominate (UNN), a successor to the UN, was established to combat the hostility and corruption of power-hungry corporations, including TriOptimum. Artificial intelligence was reduced to the most rudimentary of tasks to prevent the creation of another SHODAN-like malevolent AI.

In 2100, 28 years later, the company's failed stocks and assets were bought by a Russian oligarch named Anatoly Korenchkin, a former black market operator who sought to make money legitimately. He re-licensed and restored the company to its former status in the following decade. Along with producing healthcare and consumer products, Korenchkin signed weapons contracts with various military organizations, private and political-owned. The new UNN was virtually powerless, with Korenchkin exercising control over them.

In January 2114, 42 years after the Citadel events and 14 years into rebuilding TriOptimum, the company created an experimental FTL starship, the Von Braun, which is on its maiden voyage. The ship is followed by a UNN space vessel, the Rickenbacker, controlled by Captain William Bedford Diego, son of the Citadel Station's infamous commander, Edward Diego, and public hero of the Battle of the Boston Harbor during the Eastern States Police Action. Because the Rickenbacker does not have an FTL system, the two ships are attached for the trip. However, Korenchkin was egotistical enough to make himself the captain of the Von Braun despite being inexperienced.

Five months into the journey, the ships respond to a distress signal from the planet Tau Ceti V, outside the Solar System. A rescue team is sent to the planet's surface, where they discover strange eggs; these eggs, found in an old ejection pod, infect the rescue team and integrate them into an alien communion known as "the Many" - a psychic hive mind generated by parasitic worms which can infect and mutate a human host. The parasites eventually spread to both ships and take over or kill most of their crews.

=== Story ===
Owing to a computer malfunction, the remaining soldier awakens with amnesia in a cryo-tube on the medical deck of the Von Braun, being implanted with an illegal cyber-neural interface. Another survivor, Dr. Janice Polito, contacts and guides him to safety before the cabin depressurizes. She demands that he meets her on deck 4 of the Von Braun. Along the way, the soldier battles the infected crew members. The Many telepathically communicate with him, attempting to convince him to join them. After restarting the ship's engine core, the soldier reaches deck 4 and discovers that Polito is dead and is soon confronted by SHODAN. It is revealed she has been posing as Polito to gain the soldier's trust.

SHODAN mentions that she is responsible for creating the Many through her bioengineering experiments on Citadel Station. The Hacker, who freed her from her ethical restraints, ejected the grove that contained her experiments to prevent them from contaminating Earth, an act that allowed part of SHODAN to survive in the grove. The grove crash-landed on Tau Ceti V. While SHODAN went into forced hibernation, the Many evolved beyond her control. SHODAN tells the soldier that his only chance for survival lies in helping destroy her creations. Efforts to regain control of XERXES, the main computer on the Von Braun, fail. SHODAN informs the soldier that destroying the ship is their only option, but he must transmit her program to the Rickenbacker first. While en route, the soldier briefly encounters two survivors, Thomas "Tommy" Suarez and Rebecca Siddons, (Note: Not to be confused with Rebecca Lansing from the original System Shock) who flee the ship aboard an escape pod.

With the transfer complete, the soldier travels to the Rickenbacker and learns both ships have been enveloped by the infection's source, a gigantic mass of bio-organic tissue that has wrapped itself over the two ships. The soldier enters the biomass and destroys its core, stopping the infection. SHODAN congratulates him and tells of her intentions to merge real space and cyberspace through the Von Braun's faster-than-light drive. The soldier confronts SHODAN in cyberspace and defeats her. The final scene shows Tommy and Rebecca receiving a message from the Von Braun. Tommy responds, saying they will return and noting that Rebecca is acting strange. Rebecca speaks in a SHODAN-like voice, asking Tommy if he "likes her new look" as the screen fades to black.

== History ==
=== Development ===
Horror is a key focus of System Shock 2. This concept art depicts the protagonist encountering an infected crewmember in the Recreation deck of the Von Braun.

Development of System Shock 2 began in 1997 when Looking Glass Studios approached Irrational Games with an idea to co-develop a game. The development team were fans of System Shock and sought to create a similar game. Early story ideas were similar to the novella Heart of Darkness. In an early draft, the player was tasked with assassinating an insane commander on a starship. The original title, according to its pitch document, was Junction Point. The philosophy of the design was to continue to develop the concept of a dungeon crawler, like Ultima Underworld: The Stygian Abyss, in a science fiction setting, the basis for System Shock. However, the press mistook System Shock to be closer to a Doom clone which was cited for its poor financial success. With Junction Point, the goal was to add in significant role-playing elements and a persistent storyline as to distance the game from Doom.

The title took 18 months to create with a budget of $1.7 million. It was pitched to several publishers until Electronic Arts—who owned the rights to the System Shock franchise—responded by suggesting the game become a sequel to System Shock. The development team agreed; Electronic Arts became the publisher and story changes were made to incorporate the franchise. The project was allotted one year to be completed and to compensate for the short time frame, the staff began working with Looking Glass Studio's unfinished Dark Engine, the same engine used to create Thief: The Dark Project.

The designers included role-playing elements. Similar to Ultima Underworld, another Looking Glass Studios project, the environment in System Shock 2 is persistent and constantly changes without the player's presence. Paper-and-pencil role-playing games were influential; the character customization system was based on Traveller's methodology and was implemented in the fictional military branches which, by allowing multiple character paths, the player could receive a more open-ended gameplay experience. Horror was a key focus and four major points were identified to successfully incorporate it. Isolation was deemed primary, which resulted in the player having little physical contact with other sentient beings. Secondly, a vulnerability was created by focusing on a fragile character. Last were the inclusion of moody sound effects and "the intelligent placement of lighting and shadows". The game's lead designer, Ken Levine, oversaw the return of System Shock villain SHODAN. Part of Levine's design was to ally the player with her. Levine sought to challenge the player by having SHODAN betray the player: "Sometimes characters are betrayed, but the player never is. I wanted to violate that trust and make the player feel that they, and not [only] the character, were led on and deceived". This design choice was controversial with the development team.

Several problems were encountered during the project. Because the team comprised two software companies, tension emerged regarding job assignments and some developers left the project. Additionally, many employees were largely inexperienced, but in retrospect project manager Jonathan Chey felt this was advantageous, stating "inexperience also bred enthusiasm and commitment that might not have been present with a more jaded set of developers." The Dark Engine posed problems of its own. It was unfinished, forcing the programmers to fix software bugs when encountered. In contrast, working closely with the engine code allowed them to write additional features. Not all setbacks were localized; a demonstration build at E3 was hindered when it was requested all guns be removed from the presentation due to then-recent Columbine High School massacre.

=== Release ===
A demo for the game, featuring a tutorial and a third of the first mission, was released on August 2, 1999. Nine days later, System Shock 2 was shipped to retailers in North America. The game was made available in the United Kingdom one month later on September 18. An enhancement patch was released a month later and added significant features, such as co-operative multiplayer and control over weapon degradation and enemy respawn rates. A port was planned for the Dreamcast but was canceled.

=== End-of-support ===
Around 2000, with the end-of-support for the game by the developer and publisher, remaining bugs and compatibility with newer operating systems and hardware became a growing problem. To compensate the missing support, some fans of the game became active in the modding community to update the game. For instance, the "Rebirth" graphical enhancement mod replaced many low-polygonal models with higher quality ones, a "Shock Texture Upgrade Project" increased the resolution of textures, and an updated level editor was released by the user community.

=== Intellectual property debacle and re-release ===
The intellectual property (IP) rights of System Shock 2 were caught for years in complications between Electronic Arts and Meadowbrook Insurance Group (the parent company of Star Insurance Company), the entity that acquired the assets of Looking Glass Studios on their closure; however, according to a lawyer for Star Insurance, they have since acquired the lingering intellectual property rights from EA.

In the player community, attempts had been made to update and patch System Shock 2 for known issues on newer operating systems and limitations that had been hard-coded into the game. In 2009, a complete copy of System Shock 2's Dark Engine source code was discovered in the possession of an ex-Looking Glass Studios employee who was at the time continuing his work for Eidos Interactive. In late April 2010, a user on the Dreamcast Talk forum disassembled the contents of a Dreamcast development kit he had purchased, and among the content he received was some of the source code for Looking Glass games, including System Shock. An unknown user, going only as "Le Corbeau" (The Raven), issued a patch for System Shock 2 and Thief 2 in 2012 that resolved several of the known issue with the Dark engine and other features. It is believed that the patches were enabled by the Dreamcast kit, using a combination of the available source code and by disassembling libraries off the development kit. The patch became known informally as the "NewDark" patch to distinguish it from other efforts to improve the game.

At about the same time, Stephen Kick of Nightdive Studios had been seeking to rerelease System Shock 2 on Windows, and Star Insurance provided him with the rights to do so. Shortly after getting this approval, the NewDark patch had been released, and Kick attempted to contact "Le Corbeau" to discuss the use of their patch, but the user was impossible to contact. Kick decided to approach GOG.com for a timed-exclusive release on their digital distribution website in February 2013, where the game was the most requested to be added to the catalog. This version, considered by GOG.com to be a "collector's edition", included the "Le Corbeau" NewDark patch. In addition, the updates allow user-made modifications to be applied more seamlessly. The release also contains additional material such as the game's soundtrack, maps of the Von Braun, and the original pitch document for the game. The update rights also allowed a Mac OS X version of System Shock 2 to be subsequently released on June 18, 2013, through GOG.com. The title became available on Steam on May 10, 2013. In April 2014, a Linux version was also released. Both the OS X and Linux versions run through Wine. "Le Corbeau" has continued to update the game since 2012, with their patches being incorporated into the versions that Nightdive distributes through GOG.com and Steam.

Since then, Nightdive has acquired the rights to System Shock, releasing an enhanced version in September 2015. Kick has reported they have acquired full rights to the series since then.

== Reception ==
Reception

Aggregate score
Aggregator	Score
Metacritic	92/100

Review scores
Publication	Score
AllGame	4/5
Computer and Video Games	9.5/10
Edge	8/10
GameFan	93/100
GamePro	5/5
GameRevolution	A
GameSpot	8.5/10
IGN	9.0/10
Next Generation	4/5
PC Gamer (US)	95%
PC Zone	96%
Computer Games Magazine	5/5

System Shock 2 received critical acclaim. It received over a dozen awards, including seven "Game of the Year" awards. Reviews were very positive and lauded the title for its hybrid gameplay, moody sound design, and engaging story. System Shock 2 is regarded by critics as highly influential, particularly on first-person shooters and the horror genre. In a retrospective article, GameSpot declared the title "well ahead of its time" and stated that it "upped the ante in dramatic and mechanical terms" by creating a horrific gameplay experience. Despite critical acclaim and being the tenth best selling PC game in the US the month of its release, the title did not perform well commercially; only 58,671 copies were sold by April 2000.

Several publications praised the title for its open-ended gameplay. With regard to character customization, Trent Ward of IGN stated the best element of the role-playing system was allowing gamers to "play the game as completely different characters", and felt this made each play-through unique. Erik Reckase writing for Just Adventure agreed, saying "There are very few games that allow you [to] play the way you want". Alec Norands of Allgame believed that the different character classes made the game "diverse enough to demand instant replayability". Robert Mayer from Computer Games Magazine called System Shock 2 "a game that truly defies classification in a single genre", and ensured that "the action is occasionally fast-paced, it's more often tactical, placing a premium on thought rather than on reflexes".

Buck DeFore reviewed the PC version of the game for Next Generation, rating it four stars out of five, and stated that "Bluntly put, System Shock 2 is a welcome visit to the lost arts of the good old days, and an immersive experience as long as you don't mind some of the cobwebs that come along with it."

A number of critics described the game as frightening. Computer and Video Games described the atmosphere as "gripping" and guaranteed readers they would "jump out of [their] skin" numerous times. Allgame found the sound design particularly effective, calling it "absolutely, teeth-clenchingly disturbing", while PC Gamer's William Harms named System Shock 2 as the most frightening game he had ever played. Some critics found the weapon degradation system to be irritating, and members of the development team have also expressed misgivings about the system. The role-playing system was another point of contention; GameSpot described the job system as "badly unbalanced" because the player can develop skills outside their career choice. Allgame felt similarly about the system, saying it "leaned towards a hacker character".

Along with Deus Ex, Sid Shuman of GamePro called System Shock 2 "[one of the] twin barrels of modern [first-person shooter] innovation", owing to its complex role-playing gameplay. IGN writer Cam Shea referred to the game as "another reinvention of the FPS genre", citing the story, characters, and RPG system. PC Zone lauded the game as a "fabulous example of a modern-day computer game" and named it "a sci-fi horror masterpiece". The title has been inducted into a number of features listing the greatest games ever made, including ones by GameSpy, Edge, Empire, IGN, GameSpot and PC Gamer. IGN also ranked System Shock 2 as the 35th greatest first-person shooter of all time. X-Play called it the second scariest game of all time, behind Silent Hill 2. SHODAN has proven to be a popular character among most critics, including IGN, GameSpot and The Phoenix.

System Shock 2 won PC Gamer US's 1999 "Best Roleplaying Game" and "Special Achievement in Sound" awards, and was a runner-up in the magazine's overall "Game of the Year" category. The editors of Computer Gaming World nominated it for their "Role-Playing Game of the Year" prize, which ultimately went to Planescape: Torment.

== Legacy ==
=== 25th Anniversary Remaster ===
On a stream during the 20th anniversary of System Shock 2 on August 11, 2019, Nightdive Studios announced an enhanced edition of the game was in development. Nightdive had been able to disassemble the original game's source code, allowing them to improve upon the original. They planned to port the game to their KEX Engine, the same engine they used for the System Shock: Enhanced Edition and work to make sure that the co-operative play features are better implemented.

It was originally also planned that a virtual reality version of the game would release alongside the Enhanced Edition; however, it was internally scrapped midway through development, for unknown reasons. The VR version would have used gameplay features that were introduced with Half-Life: Alyx, and would have also been capable of cross-platform play with players on other platforms than VR.

In 2025, the port was renamed System Shock 2: 25th Anniversary Remaster. It was originally planned to be released on June 26, 2025 for Nintendo Switch, PlayStation 4, PlayStation 5, Windows, Xbox One and Xbox Series X/S simultaneously but Nightdive ran into unforeseen issues with the version for consoles and delayed the consoles release date for July 10. No further issues occurred, and the console versions launched successfully on that date. On June 3, 2026, a Nintendo Switch 2 edition of the remaster was released as a free upgrade from the Switch version, which included higher resolution models, cross-platform play support, and bonus materials.

=== Sequel projects ===
System Shock 2 has amassed a cult following, with fans asking for a sequel. On January 9, 2006, GameSpot reported that Electronic Arts had renewed its trademark protection on the System Shock name, leading to speculation that System Shock 3 might be under development. Three days later, Computer and Video Games reported a reliable source had come forward and confirmed the title's production. Electronic Arts UK made no comment when confronted with the information. PC Gamer UK stated the team behind The Godfather (EA Redwood Shores, later Visceral, defunct 2017) was charged with its creation. Ken Levine, when asked whether he would helm the third installment, replied: "that question is completely out of my hands". He expressed optimism at the prospect of System Shock 3, but revealed that EA had not shown interest in his own proposal for a sequel, and was not optimistic with regards to their abilities. Electronic Arts did not confirm a new title in the series and allowed the System Shock trademark registration to lapse. Redwood Shores' next release was 2008's Dead Space, a game with noted similarities in theme and presentation to the System Shock series. According to Dead Space designers Ben Wanat and Wright Bagwell, their project was originally intended to be System Shock 3, before the release of Resident Evil 4 inspired them to go back to the drawing board and develop it into something more along those lines, eventually becoming Dead Space.

In March 2015, a fan sequel mod for the game, System Shock Infinite, was released, incorporating elements from spiritual successor BioShock Infinite.

In November 2015, Nightdive Studios, after acquiring the rights to the System Shock franchise, stated they were considering developing a third title in the series. In December 2015, OtherSide Entertainment, a studio founded by former Looking Glass Studios designer Paul Neurath, announced they were developing System Shock 3 with rights granted to them by Nightdive. OtherSide had acquired rights to make sequels to System Shock some years before this point but did not have the rights to the series name, which Nightdive was able to provide. The sequel will feature Terri Brosius reprising her voice for SHODAN, and will include work from original System Shock concept artist Robb Waters. Warren Spector, the producer of the first System Shock, announced in February 2016 that he has joined OtherSide Entertainment and will be working on System Shock 3. According to Spector, the narrative will pick up immediately from the end of System Shock 2, with SHODAN having taken over Rebecca's body. System Shock 3 will use the Unity game engine, with a teaser shown during Unity's press event at the 2019 Game Developers Conference.

Starbreeze Studios was originally planning to provide a $12 million "publishing-only" investment in System Shock 3, allowing OtherSide to retain all rights while seeking a 120% return on investment followed by equal shares of revenue splitting. Starbreeze's investment would allow the game to be developed for consoles in addition to the planned personal computer versions. However, in the wake of several financial problems in late 2018, Starbreeze has given back the publishing rights to System Shock 3 to OtherSide, and separated itself from the project. OtherSide stated they had the capability to self-publish System Shock 3 should they be unable to find a publishing partner but would prefer to have a publishing partner. At least twelve OtherSide employees working on System Shock 3, including several in lead roles, left the studio between late 2019 and early 2020. One former employee stated that the game's development team was "no longer employed"; however, in April 2020, OtherSide's vice president of marketing and development, Walter Somol, stated that the team was "still here" and progress on the project was "coming along nicely", but they were working remotely, due to the COVID-19 pandemic. After several journalists noted that the System Shock 3 websites had been transferred to ownership under Tencent in May 2020, Otherside confirmed that they had been unable to continue the series as a smaller studio and transferred the licensed rights to Tencent to continue its development, though Spector affirmed that OtherSide was still involved in its development alongside Tencent.

Warren Spector has since stated that OtherSide stopped working on System Shock 3 in 2019, and that they are now working on an immersive simulation based on a new intellectual property developed by OtherSide.

In 2022, during Gamescon, Stephen Kick, Nightdive's CEO, stated in an interview after he finished the System Shock remake, that he intended to begin development on a System Shock 2 remake.

=== Spiritual successors ===
In 2007, Irrational Games—briefly known as 2K Boston/2K Australia—released a spiritual successor to the System Shock series, entitled BioShock. The game takes place in an abandoned underwater utopian community destroyed by the genetic modification of its populace and shares many gameplay elements with System Shock 2: reconstitution stations can be activated, allowing the player to be resurrected when they die; hacking, ammo conservation, and exploration are integral parts of gameplay; and unique powers may be acquired via plasmids, special abilities that function similarly to psionics in System Shock 2. The two titles share plot similarities and employ audio logs and encounters with ghostly apparitions to reveal backstory. In BioShock Infinite, Irrational Games included a gameplay feature called "1999 Mode", specifically in reference to System Shock 2's release year, designed to provide a similar game experience with a higher difficulty and long-lasting effects of choices made that would remind players of System Shock's unforgiving nature.

In 2017, Arkane Studios published Prey, which takes place on a space station named Talos I, similar to System Shock. It, too, features psionic abilities, in the form of "Neuromods", as a fundamental gameplay feature, and uses a mixture of audio logs and pieces of text to advance the game's backstory. Prey features elements like hacking, crafting, and features a heavy emphasis on side-quest exploration and careful conservation of ammunition and "Psi Points", player stat that controls how many psi abilities can be used. The game features crew members who have become infected, though, not as the result of an AI, but instead as the result of a failure of containment around a mysterious alien species known as the Typhon. Within the game, references are made to System Shock's developers, such as the "Looking Glass" technology that plays a significant role in the story's plot.
