= PO'ed =

1995 video game

- Developer: Any Channel
- Publishers: 3DO: NA: Any Channel; EU: The 3DO Company; PlayStation: NA: Accolade; JP: Coconuts Japan Entertainment; EU: Warner Interactive Europe; Definitive Edition: WW: Nightdive Studios
- Producer: Brian Yen
- Designer: Russ Pflughaupt
- Programmers: Irene Pan; Nate Huang
- Artist: Jane Sommerhauser
- Writer: Phil Lam
- Composer: Jim Savitt
- Platforms: 3DO; PlayStation; Definitive Edition: Nintendo Switch; PlayStation 4; PlayStation 5; Windows; Xbox One; Xbox Series X/S
- Release: 3DO: NA: November 20, 1995; EU: 1995; PlayStation: NA: May 8, 1996; JP: August 23, 1996; EU: November 1996; Definitive Edition: WW: May 16, 2024
- Genre: First-person shooter
- Mode: Single-player

PO'ed is a 1995 first-person shooter video game developed and published by Any Channel for the 3DO Interactive Multiplayer. It follows a chef attempting to escape a hostile, alien world. A PlayStation port was published in May 1996 by Accolade. A remastered version of the game developed by Nightdive Studios, titled PO'ed: Definitive Edition, was released on May 16, 2024, for Microsoft Windows, Nintendo Switch, PlayStation 4, PlayStation 5, Xbox One and Xbox Series X/S.

== Gameplay ==
Ingame screenshot of the 3DO version

PO'ed is a first-person shooter using primitive weapons such as a frying pan and a drill, as well as futuristic alien weapons. The player must advance through 26 levels filled with alien monsters. A jet pack can also be acquired to facilitate the player's exploration of levels. When the jet pack is selected, the jump button instead causes the player character to accelerate skyward, and releasing the button causes the player character to fall, accelerating downwards. The physics-based jet pack thus does not allow the player character to naturally hover, though they can maintain a relatively steady altitude by rhythmically tapping the jet pack button.

== Plot ==
A chef's spacecraft has crash-landed on an alien world, and he must escape.

== Development ==
The developers of PO'ed, Any Channel, was founded in July 1993 by former employees of Sun Microsystems. PO'ed began development in October 1993, initially as a spare-time project. Russel Pflughaupt of Any Channel recalled, "We looked at games like Doom, Marathon, and Dark Forces, and took what we felt were their best elements. But we wanted to get away from the tunnel-based feel of those games, so we made the environments in PO'ed very open, and not formulaic at all."

The team originally wanted to include a motorcycle and a tank for the player character to ride in addition to the jet pack, but couldn't find a way to incorporate their use into the level designs.

On May 23, 1995, The 3DO Company entered an "Affiliated Label" agreement with Any Channel, which granted The 3DO Company the rights to distribute Any Channel's games in North America and both publish and distribute them everywhere else in the world for the next three years, starting with PO'ed.

== Reception ==
Reception

Review scores
Publication	Score
Electronic Gaming Monthly	6.125/10 (PS1)
Next Generation	4/5 (3DO, PS1)
Maximum	1/5 (3DO)
Power Unlimited	79% (3DO)

PO'ed met with polarized opinions among critics. Reviewing the 3DO version, Scary Larry of GamePro commented that the game has serious control problems, with the character often careening off edges or failing to turn at crucial moments. He nonetheless concluded that the game sufficiently fills the role of first-person shooter for the 3DO, citing the unique assortment of weapons, aggressive enemy AI, sense of humor, and relatively strong graphics. Maximum summarized the game as the "worst 3D action title ever seen on any format, with the exception of PlayStation Crime Crackers and some early PC public domain games (indeed, the graphics and gameplay are very reminiscent of such past atrocities)." They elaborated that the 3D environments constantly glitch, the floors are untextured, the attempts at humor are feeble, enemies show heavy pixelation even at medium distances, and the controls are extremely poor.

A reviewer for Next Generation noted that PO'ed began as an independent project by a small group of programmers, and said that its "labor of love" nature "is both a blessing and a curse." He elaborated that the game plays smoothly, doesn't limit the player to just walking to get around, and generally stands out from other first person shooters, but that "the meticulously over designed level layouts" and intricate textures often make the game confusing to the point of frustration. He concluded, "It's well done, very well done, but too tricky for its own good."

Reviewing the PlayStation version, most of the four reviewers of Electronic Gaming Monthly felt that PO'ed was a dull first-person shooter with nothing to set it apart from other games in the genre save for its sense of humor, which quickly wears thin. Mark Lefebvre also criticized the lack of improvement over the 3DO version. Mike Desmond, in a dissenting opinion, called PO'ed "an all-around good title that ranks highly among titles such as Doom and Duke Nukem 3D." He praised the detailed graphics, variety of "topsy turvy" level designs, and large selection of weapons. In GamePro, Slo Mo said that the game lacks the terror and atmosphere of games like Doom and Alien Trilogy, but "does a nice job of tip-toeing between fierce and funny." He particularly commented on the aggressive enemy AI and unique weapons. Next Generation said that the PlayStation version retains the bizarre style and overall experience of the 3DO original while making it easier to play, due to better controls and graphics while more clearly delineate the extremely intricate levels.
