= Count Zero =

1986 book by William Gibson

- Cover of first edition (hardcover)
- Author: William Gibson
- Language: English
- Series: Sprawl trilogy
- Genre: Science fiction, dystopian fiction, cyberpunk
- Publisher: Victor Gollancz Ltd
- Publication date: 1986
- Publication place: United States
- Media type: Print (hardback and paperback)
- Pages: 256
- ISBN: 0-575-03696-6 (first edition)
- Preceded by: Neuromancer
- Followed by: Mona Lisa Overdrive

Count Zero is a science fiction novel by American-Canadian writer William Gibson, originally published in 1986. It presents a near future whose technologies include a network of supercomputers that created a "matrix" in "cyberspace", an accessible, virtual, three-dimensionally active "inner space", which, for Gibson, was seen as being dominated by violent competition between small numbers of very rich individuals and multinational corporations. The novel is composed of a trio of plot lines that ultimately converge.

Count Zero is the second volume of the Sprawl trilogy, which began with Neuromancer and concludes with Mona Lisa Overdrive. It was serialized in the January through March 1986 monthly issues of Isaac Asimov's Science Fiction Magazine; the January cover was devoted to the story, with art by Hisaki Yasuda.

While Gibson did not introduce the concept or coin the term "cyberpunk", a subgenre of science fiction (nor particularly associated himself with it), he is considered to have first envisioned and described the concept of "cyberspace". The novel, Count Zero, is nonetheless regarded as an early example of the cyberpunk subgenre.

== Publication history ==
Volume 2 of the Sprawl trilogy, Count Zero follows Neuromancer (1984), with the series being concluded by Mona Lisa Overdrive (1988). It appeared in serial form in Isaac Asimov's Science Fiction Magazine, in the January, February, and March 1986 issues (the January being the 100th of that magazine), where each part was accompanied by black and white art produced by J. K. Potter. The January cover of the magazine was devoted to the story, with art by Hisaki Yasuda. According to a published letter from Gibson, the magazine version was edited with his permission to contain less swearing and sexual content, in part to allow access to youth audiences in the United States.

It was first published in novel form in 1986.

== Title ==
The title of the book is a pseudonym of the main character Bobby Newmark. The front leaf of the book suggests that it is a programming practice on the Zilog Z80 processor, quoting a guide by Rodnay Zaks: "On receiving an interrupt, decrement the counter to zero." While Zaks's guide is real, the quotation is fictitious. In the context of Z80 programming, "zero count" is a signal that the Z8430 timer circuit generates to interrupt the processor when it completes a countdown (the reverse of Gibson's description).

== Plot ==
=== Introduction ===
In Count Zero Gibson presents "a high-tech near-future of linked super-computers... [a matrix that] has given rise to "cyberspace," an "inner" space something like a three-dimensional video display... [in a] world is dominated by multinational corporations... a few fabulously rich individuals, and the cutthroat competition between them." Seven years after the events of Neuromancer, strange things begin to happen in the Matrix, leading to the proliferation of what appear to be voodoo gods (hinted to be the fractured remains of the joined AIs that were Neuromancer and Wintermute). Two powerful multinational corporations, Maas Biolabs and Hosaka, are engaged in a battle for control over a powerful new technology, a biochip, using hackers and the Matrix as well as espionage and violence.

As with later Gibson works, Count Zero has multiple plot-lines which ultimately converge at its climax:

=== Plot line one: The mercenary Turner and his protectee Angie Mitchell ===
In the southwestern US, Turner, a corporate mercenary soldier, has been hired by former partner Conroy to help Christopher Mitchell, a brilliant researcher and bio-hacker, make an illegal career move from Maas' corporate fortress built into a mesa in the Arizona desert to Hosaka, a rival corporation. The attempt is a disaster, and Turner ends up escaping with Angie Mitchell, the scientist's young daughter, instead. Implanted in her brain by her father, she carries the secret plans of the construction of the valuable "biosoft" that has made Maas so influential and powerful. This "biosoft" is what multibillionaire Josef Virek (see thread three) ruthlessly pursues so that he can make an evolutionary jump to something resembling omniscience and immortality. During their flight from both Maas and Hosaka agents, Turner and Angie stay with Rudy, the former's estranged brother, and Sally, his partner and caretaker. Rudy identifies a device implanted in Angie's skull: her father had apparently altered her nervous system to allow her to access the Cyberspace Matrix directly, without a "deck" (a computer with an interface directly into the user's brain), but she is not aware of this. During their stay, Turner has a one-night stand with Sally and then leaves with Angie. In the Sprawl he meets with Bobby's group in a shopping mall besieged by agents of Maas and Conroy.

=== Plot line two: The hacker, Bobby Newmark and his AI protectress ===
In Barrytown, New Jersey a young amateur computer hacker, Bobby Newmark, self-named "Count Zero", is given a piece of black market software by some criminal associates "to test". When he plugs himself into the matrix and runs the program, it almost kills him. The only thing that saves his life is a sudden image of a girl made of light who interferes and unhooks him from the software just before he flatlines. After fleeing his house (which is immediately thereafter destroyed) he meets Lucas, Beauvoir, and Jackie, a group fascinated by and dedicated to the recent appearance of voodoo deities in Cyberspace, who take him into their protection as they are collectively targeted by various corporate agents. It is eventually revealed that Bobby's mysterious savior is Angie (see Thread One); the two only meet physically at the very end of the book.

=== Plot line three: the artist Marly Krushkova and her employer Josef Virek ===
Thread Three: Marly Krushkova, the former owner of a Paris art gallery whose reputation was destroyed when she was tricked into trying to sell a forgery, is recruited by ultra-rich, reclusive art patron Josef Virek to find the unknown creator of a series of futuristic collage boxes styled after the work of Joseph Cornell. Unbeknownst to her, the reason behind Virek's interest in these boxes is related to indications of biosoft construction in the design of one, which he suspects may be contained in the others.

=== Plot-line four: the multiple AIs and their plans ===
The first book of Gibson's Sprawl series, Neuromancer, introduced two AIs, Wintermute and the eponymous Neuromancer. These two AIs were designed by the head of a multi-generational techno-oligarchical family, the Tessier-Ashpools, and after meeting in Neuromancer they joined and fissioned into multiple new AIs. These new AIs are the fragmented, compartmentalized remains of Wintermute and Neuromancer and have taken on the personalities of different Haitian voodoo gods, because they have found these personalities to be the best representations of themselves for communicating with humanity. Hackers worldwide are becoming aware that there is something weird loose in the cyberspace matrix, but most are reluctant to talk about (or deal with) "voodoo spooks" supposedly haunting cyberspace.

=== Climax ===
These plotlines come together at the end of the story.

Virek - the hunter of immortality and unlimited power - is a threat to the AI voodoo gods. They gave Christopher Mitchell the information to develop the biosoft, instructing him to insert a biosoft modification in his daughter Angie's brain, and then sent the Cornell boxes into the world to attract the malicious Virek. When Virek was drawn out into the open he is killed by one of the AI voodoo gods, using Bobby Newmark as a conduit.

=== Epilogue ===
Epilogue chapters resolve the fates of the protagonists, at least until the next novel Mona Lisa Overdrive.

- Turner has returned to his childhood home (the same one occupied by Rudy and Sally earlier in the book) to raise the child conceived during his affair with Sally;
- Angie has attained celebrity status as a simstim star, and has entered a relationship with Bobby who is employed as her 'bodyguard';
- Marly has returned to Paris and now curates one of the largest art galleries in the city;
- Rudy was killed by Conroy's agents when they were trailing Turner and Angie.
- The sentient AI who present as voodoo gods now inhabit the Cyberspace Matrix, a synergistically linked computer network of databases that encompasses all information on Earth. But for now most of humanity remains unaware.

== Characters ==
Cover of the April 1987 Ace paperback edition with cover art by Richard Berry.

Bobby Newmark. At the beginning of the novel, Bobby is a small-time "cowboy" (hacker) who wants to be a big name in cyberspace. He is given what he naïvely trusts is an "ICE breaker" (hacking software), unaware that he is in fact being used to test some unknown software to see what it does. He is directed to use the software to infiltrate a black ICE database which nearly ends up killing him. The acronym ICE is shorthand for "Intrusion Countermeasures Electronics". The most formidable of these data defense networks are powerful enough to trace back and kill any hacker making an attempt to defeat them. This is legally sanctioned or is, at least, not illegal. But at the last moment Bobby is rescued, while in Cyberspace and dying, by an image of a girl, Angela Mitchell, who is somehow able to enter cyberspace without using a "deck" (computer).

Bobby realizes his target must now know where he lives, so he flees. Shortly after leaving his apartment, he is brutally mugged for his deck and left for dead, only to be rescued and given medical attention by the owners of the software Bobby tried out, a small group who are very interested in what happened to him in Cyberspace. Bobby and Angela (who are roughly the same age) meet at the end of the book. Bobby makes a minor appearance in the third Sprawl novel, Mona Lisa Overdrive.

Turner. Turner (the only name by which he is known in the novel) is a mercenary who is employed by various corporations to help vital employees of competing corporations "defect" to Turner's employers. The novel begins with an account of a job in New Delhi in which Turner was nearly killed by a Slamhound, a type of mobile bomb. After three months of reconstructive surgery in Singapore, Turner takes a vacation in Mexico, where he meets and becomes sexually involved with a woman named Allison. While on the beach with Allison, Turner sees a familiar yacht close to shore and a powerboat from the yacht approaching the beach, bearing the logo of the Hosaka Corporation. Turner tells Allison to leave while he waits for the raft's passenger to come ashore. He already knows that the passenger is Conroy, another mercenary with whom Turner has worked in the past. Conroy recruits Turner for another "extraction" job; this time, Conroy and Turner are to help a man named Christopher Mitchell leave Maas Biolabs for Hosaka. Mitchell carries with him the expertise to design and manufacture "biochips", a technology superior to the nearly ubiquitous silicon microprocessors of the era. Maas Biolabs holds the patents and secrets to biochip technology and will use every means it can to prevent Mitchell's escape. Conroy also reveals that Allison is a "field psychologist" working for Hosaka to monitor Turner and help his recovery.

Turner is a disciplined professional, but is troubled by memories of past jobs that ended tragically as well as his relationship with his gifted brother Rudy (who is a reclusive alcoholic and drug addict). Turner comes to realize that the unsuccessful attempt to "bring over" Christopher Mitchell from Maas to Hosaka resulted from a betrayal and suspects that Conroy is behind it. He also recognizes that Angie Mitchell was sent out from the Maas facility by her father, and that she is in grave danger. He resolves to protect her while finding out who is pursuing her and why.

Marly Krushkhova. Marly, prior to the beginning of the story, operated a small art gallery in Paris. She became notorious as a result of the disgrace from attempting to sell a forged box assemblage that was supposedly a lost piece by the American sculptor Joseph Cornell. She was unaware that the piece was a fake, having been duped by her then-lover Alain, the gallery's co-owner, who had embezzled money from the gallery to finance the forgery. Unemployed and living with her friend Andrea, Marly receives a job offer from the immensely wealthy businessman Josef Virek. During her interview, conducted via a very advanced simstim link, Virek informs Marly that he has collected several remarkable box assemblages similar to those created by Cornell. Virek then hires Marly to find out who is producing the pieces, offering her unlimited financial support during the course of her search.

Although Marly welcomes the opportunity to get out of her current situation, she does not fully trust the mysterious and secretive Virek. This mistrust only deepens when it becomes clear that she is being followed and monitored by Virek's agents, in particular Virek's right-hand man, Paco. Marly tries to stay a step ahead of Virek and Paco while discovering the identity of the boxes' creator.

== Impact and reception ==
In this and his earlier Neuromancer work, Gibson—while not creating, naming, or (per Jack Womack) much wishing to be associated with the term—nevertheless became associated with the cyberpunk moniker subgenre of science fiction; more importantly, he is considered to have first envisioned and described the concept of "cyberspace".

Dave Langford reviewed Count Zero for White Dwarf #76, and stated that "This may not have the impact of Neuromancer's first window on Gibson's future, but it's a far better novel." Count Zero was nominated for the Nebula and British Science Fiction Awards in 1986, as well as the Hugo and Locus awards in 1987.

== See also ==
- Simulated reality
