= System Shock (2023 video game) =

2023 video game

- Developer: Nightdive Studios
- Publishers: Prime Matter; Atari (Nintendo Switch, Switch 2)
- Directors: Stephen Kick; Daniel Grayshon
- Producers: Justin Khan; Daniel Grayshon; Karlee Wetzel
- Programmer: Matthew Kenneally
- Artists: Robb Waters; Evelyn Mansell
- Composer: Jonathan Peros
- Series: System Shock
- Engine: Unreal Engine 4
- Platforms: Windows; PlayStation 4; PlayStation 5; Xbox One; Xbox Series X/S; Nintendo Switch; Nintendo Switch 2
- Release: Windows; 30 May 2023; PS4, PS5, XOne, XSXS; 21 May 2024; Nintendo Switch, Switch 2; 18 December 2025
- Genre: Action-adventure
- Mode: Single-player

System Shock is a 2023 first-person action-adventure game developed by Nightdive Studios and published by Prime Matter. It is a remake of the 1994 game System Shock by Looking Glass Studios. The game is set aboard a space station in a cyberpunk vision of the year 2072. Assuming the role of a nameless security hacker, the player attempts to hinder the plans of a malevolent artificial intelligence called SHODAN.

A remake of System Shock began development in 2015, initially utilizing the Unity engine. After a successful Kickstarter campaign raised more than $1 million in funding, the game underwent a long development cycle of nearly eight years, being delayed several times (with release windows of 2017, 2018, 2020, 2021, 2022, and 2023) as a result of changing to Unreal Engine and restarting development on the game from scratch twice after an ambitious attempt at a reboot for the series was scrapped after excessive feature creep. The final released game instead focused on being a faithful remake and delivering what the team initially promised in the Kickstarter.

System Shock was released for Windows on 30 May 2023. The game was ported to PlayStation 4, PlayStation 5, Xbox One, and Xbox Series X/S on 21 May 2024. It was later also ported to Nintendo Switch and Switch 2 on 18 December 2025. A VR version was also announced in August 2026 and is being developed by Flat2VR Studios; however, it currently does not have a release date. Planned ports for Linux and macOS were cancelled in May 2024. It received generally positive reviews from critics, though some were divided on its faithful retention of gameplay elements from the original.

== Plot ==
In the year 2072, an unnamed hacker is caught while attempting to access files concerning Citadel Station, a space station owned by the TriOptimum Corporation. The hacker is taken to Citadel Station and brought before Edward Diego, a TriOptimum executive. Diego offers to drop all charges against the hacker in exchange for a confidential hacking of SHODAN, the artificial intelligence that controls the station. Diego secretly plans to steal an experimental mutagenic virus being tested on Citadel Station and to sell it on the black market as a biological weapon. To entice cooperation, Diego promises the hacker a military-grade neural implant. After hacking SHODAN, removing the AI's ethical constraints, and handing control over to Diego, the hacker undergoes surgery for the implant and is put into a six-month healing coma. The hacker awakens from their (Note: The remake newly features the choice to play as either a male or female hacker, which was added in a patch.) coma and finds that SHODAN has commandeered the station. All robots aboard have been reprogrammed for hostility, and the crew has been either mutated, transformed into cyborgs, or killed.

Rebecca Lansing, a TriOptimum counter-terrorism consultant, contacts the hacker and informs them that SHODAN plans to use Citadel Station's mining laser to attack Earth, destroying all major cities on the planet in a bid to establish herself as a god. Rebecca promises to destroy the records of the hacker's incriminating exchange with Diego if the strike is stopped. The hacker destroys the laser by firing it while the stations shields are raised. In response, SHODAN prepares to seed Earth with the mutagenic virus that Diego planned to steal. The hacker confronts Diego, who has been transformed into a powerful cyborg by SHODAN, and jettisons the chambers used to cultivate the virus. SHODAN then attempts to upload herself to Earth's computer networks, but the hacker prevents the download's completion by destroying the four antennas that SHODAN is using to send data.

Soon after, Rebecca contacts the hacker and says that TriOptimum has authorized the station's destruction. The hacker initiates the station's self-destruct sequence and flees to the escape pod bay. They defeat Diego again and then attempt to disembark. However, SHODAN prevents the pod from launching; seeking to trap the hacker aboard the station while the bridge containing SHODAN is jettisoned to a safe distance. Rebecca tells the hacker that they can still escape if they reach the bridge; SHODAN then intercepts and jams the transmission. After fighting Diego again and killing him, the hacker makes it to the bridge as it is released from the main station, which soon detonates. They are then contacted by a technician who managed to circumvent SHODAN's jamming signal. The technician informs them that SHODAN can only be defeated in cyberspace due to the powerful shields that protect its mainframe computers. Using a terminal near the mainframe, the hacker enters cyberspace and defeats SHODAN, restoring her to pre-hack state. After being rescued, the hacker receives an offer of employment from TriOptimum, but they decline in favor of continuing their life as a hacker.

== Development and release ==
The original System Shock, released in 1994, was developed by Looking Glass Studios, which closed in 2000. The company assets, including the rights to System Shock, were acquired by Star Insurance Company, a subsidiary of Meadowbrook Insurance Group. In 2012, Nightdive Studios acquired the rights for System Shock 2 and produced a digitally distributable version updated for modern operating systems. Nightdive Studios subsequently went on to acquire the rights for System Shock and the franchise as a whole.

=== First attempt at development, initial Kickstarter ===
Two months after the release of System Shock: Enhanced Edition in September 2015, Nightdive Studios announced plans to develop a remake of System Shock for Windows and Xbox One using the Unity engine. Originally announced as a remaster, the game quickly transformed into a remake, and then a "reboot", and a Kickstarter campaign was started on June 28, 2016, with a goal of US$900,000 shortly after. Veteran designer Chris Avellone and members of the Fallout: New Vegas development team confirmed their involvement.

Alongside the Kickstarter campaign, the studio released a free demo featuring an early build of the first level of the game, exhibiting their efforts so far on the project and intended to "demonstrate [their] commitment and passion" to faithfully rebooting the game. The Kickstarter goal was met on July 9, 2016, with 19 days left in its campaign, and closed on July 28, 2016, with more than $1.35M in funding from about 21,600 backers. The additional funding was to be used towards Linux and macOS versions of the game, expanded areas, and support for the Razer Chroma. With the successful Kickstarter, Nightdive Studios anticipated a December 2017 release for the game. Additional ports for PlayStation 4, Linux, and macOS were confirmed after stretch goals were met.

=== Second attempt at development, move to Unreal Engine and focus on "reboot" ===
During the 2017 Game Developers Conference, Nightdive Studios announced they would move development from Unity to Unreal Engine 4, with director Jason Fader saying "Unity is not a great engine to use if you want to make an FPS on console". Fader cited issues related to a combination of fidelity, cross-platform support, content pipelines and performance issues as the reason for the switch. Fader also clarified that they now considered the game a more "faithful reboot" than a remake; the game's story, character, weapons, levels, and enemies remained as in the original game, but they were applying "modern design principles" to rework some of these and add in others to make the game more playable for current audiences. Fader offered one example in level design, calling the original System Shock's maps a "product of the time" which did not age well; while somewhat fixed to the level's layout, the team was able to open up some areas and remove unnecessary mazes to make the game more interesting for players. The team had also added Chris Avellone to change some of the dialog and to fix some of the plot holes from the original game, although the story remained identical. In June 2020, when asked if Chris Avellone was still involved with the game after sexual misconduct allegations arose, CEO Stephen Kick revealed that Avellone had not been involved with the game since 2017, and his contributions were not used.

In mid-February 2018, Nightdive announced that development of System Shock was put on hold. CEO Stephen Kick stated "I have put the team on a hiatus while we reassess our path so that we can return to our vision. We are taking a break, but not ending the project. System Shock is going to be completed and all of our promises fulfilled." Kick explained that as the project had shifted from a remake to a reboot, they "strayed" from the core concepts of the original game, and found they needed a larger budget. Nightdive's director of business development Larry Kuperman said they had approached publishing partners to fund the expanded effort, but could not obtain this additional support. Kick opted to put the project on hold, reassigning the team to other projects in the interim.

=== Third attempt at development, "faithful remake", and final game ===
Speaking at the Game Developers Conference in March 2018, Kick and Kuperman explained that because of the feature creep, a newly assembled team had restarted the game's development as a "remake", instead of a "reboot", staying focused on the promises of what they would deliver during the Kickstarter, and that they were now looking towards a 2020 release. The refocusing of the game also helped them to engage with interested publishing partners who were more amenable to supporting them.

In May 2020, Nightdive released an updated alpha demo of the game via GOG and Steam, along with a developer's walkthrough and commentary to accompany the release. The demo featured a new build of the game from that of previously released demos; however, it still featured voiceover audio which Nightdive had yet to re-record due to delays caused by the COVID-19 pandemic. Following Chinese developer Tencent's acquisition of the rights to System Shock 3 from OtherSide Entertainment, Nightdive also clarified that Tencent had only acquired the rights to make sequels in the series; therefore not impacting the status of the remake.

With the release of an updated demo in February 2021, Nightdive planned a release date later in 2021. By late 2021, Nightdive announced that the game's release was pushed back into 2022, but they had partnered with the Prime Matter publishing label for the game's release. A final delay into 2023 was announced, and the game was released for Windows via Steam, GOG.com, and Epic Games Store on 30 May 2023. Versions for PlayStation 4, PlayStation 5, Xbox One and Xbox Series X/S were planned to be released in 2024, as promised in the initial Kickstarter campaign. It was also planned to be released for Linux and macOS, but these versions were cancelled in May 2024. On 12 March 2024, Nightdive and Prime Matter announced that the game would be released for PlayStation 4, PlayStation 5, Xbox One and Xbox Series X/S on 21 May 2024. Physical editions would be released for PlayStation 5 and Xbox One/Xbox Series X. A version for Nintendo Switch and Switch 2 was announced on October 23, 2025 and released on December 8 by Nightdive Studios parent Atari SA and Nightdive itself.

== Reception ==
Reception

Aggregate scores
Aggregator	Score
Metacritic	(PC) 78/100 (PS5) 76/100 (XSXS) 80/100
OpenCritic	71%

Review scores
Publication	Score
Destructoid	9/10
Eurogamer	4/5
GamesRadar+	3/5
IGN	9/10
PC Gamer (US)	80/100
PCGamesN	7/10
Shacknews	8/10
The Guardian	4/5
VG247	4/5
VideoGamer.com	7/10

System Shock received "generally favorable" reviews from critics, according to review aggregator website Metacritic.

Polygon praised the visuals as "look[ing] like the way games from 1994 appear in my memory", and that "playing this game in this form helps me bring it into conversation with the entirety of the immersive sim genre".

Reviewers were divided over the remake's faithful recreation of the original's mechanics. Destructoid praised the development team's approach, stating that "They fully understand what made the classics so indispensable". Eurogamer provided similar sentiments, claiming that the remake "faithfully recreates a classic". DualShockers and PCGamesN both gave mixed responses, commenting that "it still clings to some somewhat outdated mechanics", and "by sticking to the original's ancient design it will appeal more to series fans than newcomers". PC Gamer cited it as both a positive and negative element of the game's design, "I did sometimes find myself wishing that in some parts Nightdive had tried to adapt the spirit, rather than the letter, of the original game," but ultimately still called the game "the definitive way to play System Shock in 2023 and beyond".
