= Netrunner =

Collectible card game designed by Richard Garfield

NetRunner
- Card back to the NetRunner CCG
- Designers: Richard Garfield
- Publishers: Wizards of the Coast
- Years active: April 1996 to 1999
- Players: 2
- Setup time: 15 minutes
- Playing time: ≈45 minutes
- Chance: Some
- Age range: 9+
- Skills: Card playing Arithmetic; Asymmetrical gameplay Bluffing; Deduction

Netrunner is an out-of-print collectible card game (CCG) designed by Richard Garfield, the creator of Magic: The Gathering. It was published by Wizards of the Coast and introduced in April 1996. It was produced until 1999. The game took place in the setting for the Cyberpunk 2020 role-playing game (RPG), but it also drew from the broader cyberpunk genre.

In 2012, Fantasy Flight Games released Android: Netrunner, a new card game based on Netrunner, under license from Wizards of the Coast. Since 2019, the game has been run by the nonprofit games publisher Null Signal Games.

== Gameplay ==
Netrunner depicts cyberspace combat between a global mega-corporation (the Corp) and a hacker (the Runner). The Corp aims to complete its secret agendas before the Runner can hack in and steal data. It isn't easy, though, as the Corp has strong defensive data forts protected by malevolent computer programs known as ICE (short for Intrusion Countermeasures Electronics). Runners must use special programs of their own, called icebreakers, to break through and steal the hidden plans. All this is paid for in the game by bits (representing currency), which are earned and spent during the course of play.

An interesting feature of Netrunner is its asymmetry: each side has different abilities and uses completely different cards distinguished by alternate card backs. This contrasts with most other CCGs, which usually depict a "battle between peers" where each opponent draws upon the same card pool. While a player does not have to play both sides except in tournament play, many players believe that a firm understanding of both leads to better overall player ability.

The Cyberpunk 2020 supplement Rache Bartmoss' Brainware Blowout featured rules on using Netrunner cards instead of the RPG's existing system to simulate netrunning during game sessions. It also gave conversions to the RPG of some of the cards in the base set (the rest having been mentioned in one book or another).

== Expansion sets ==
- Netrunner base set (aka Limited, v1.0) - 374 cards - Release Date: April 26, 1996. The set was sold in 60-card starter decks and 15-card booster packs.
- Proteus (v2.1) - 154 cards - Release Date: September 1996 The set was sold in 15-card booster packs, and included game mechanics considered too advanced for the base set.
- Silent Impact - Never released, development halted by WotC. However, a series of six cards labelled 'v2.0' were issued as promotional cards for a planned, but never released, Netrunner 2.0 core set. Even though originally appearing in Netrunner 1.0, these six cards have been revised for 2.0 and feature new artwork as well as revised game text. The six cards in question are Forged Activation Orders, misc.for-sale, The Shell Traders, Pacifica Regional AI, Bizarre Encryption Scheme, and New Galveston City Grid. These cards are extremely rare.
- Classic (v2.2) - 52 cards from the Silent Impact set. Release Date: November 1999

Many fan-made expansions have been created for Netrunner and released online. Some of them have been sanctioned for tournament play.

== Webrunner ==
Netrunner launched with a proto-alternate reality game called Webrunner: The Hidden Agenda, which cast players as hackers against the evil Futukora corporation. Players broke through seven puzzle-themed "gates" to get the secret data ("agenda"). The popular game was the first online game tied into a product release, making the front page of The New York Times technology section.

A sequel, Webrunner II: The Forbidden Code, followed on release of the Proteus expansion. In this, players were cast as security chiefs beset by hackers.

== Online gameplay ==
Netrunner was playable online through CCG Workshop in the past, but it was shut down by Wizards of the Coast. It is now possible to play Netrunner online using Magic Workstation on Runners' Net, a site which also holds IRC chats and forums to discuss the game. Players may also use other CCG engines such as LackeyCCG or Gccg, which allows players to build and share plugins for different card games and play the games online. This game can now be played on the OCTGN online game system.

== Product ownership ==
Zvi Mowshowitz, a well-known Magic: The Gathering Pro Tour player, attempted to purchase the license for Netrunner from Wizards of the Coast after the company stopped producing the game. Negotiations, however, fell apart without any revival of the game or transfer of ownership.

In 2012, Fantasy Flight Games announced that they were releasing a modified version of Netrunner, under license from Wizards of the Coast, called Android: Netrunner.

In 2018, Fantasy Flight Games announced that their partnership with Wizards of the Coast to license development of the game was concluding. Starting October 22, 2018, Fantasy Flight no longer sells Netrunner products.

Since 2019, Null Signal Games has continued to release new expansion sets for Netrunner, compatible with previous Android: Netrunner products, and run in-person and online organised tournaments.

In August and September 2021, Wizards of the Coast renewed trademarks for both physical and digital Netrunner goods and content. However, as of February 23, 2022, Wizards of the Coast filed a Notice of Abandonment for the trademark application.

== Reception ==
Andy Butcher reviewed Netrunner for Arcane magazine in 1996, rating it a 9 out of 10 overall. Butcher comments that "Netrunner is almost without fault. It's certainly the best new card game in the last year, and arguably the best since Magic started it all. Richard Garfield has done it again."

Netrunner was lauded by critics, such as InQuest magazine, for its balanced gameplay and impressive artwork. In 1999 Pyramid magazine named Netrunner as one of "The Millennium's Most Underrated Games". According to editor Scott Haring, "among the connoisseurs of the card game design art, Netrunner is considered to be one of the best-designed games ever."

Andy Butcher reviewed Proteus for Arcane magazine, rating it a 9 out of 10 overall, and stated that "Proteus is a great example of what a CCG expansion set should be. It builds on the strengths of the basic game, offering new strategies for both players, as well as maintaining the balance of Netrunner. None of the new cards or rules are too powerful, and neither do they add too much complexity. They do give both sides more to think about, introducing more uncertainty, but that's a good thing. So, a superb expansion set for a superb game."

== Reviews ==
- Australian Realms #29
- Casus Belli #95
- Scrye #58
- Świat Gier Komputerowych #57
