= Tribe (band) =

American alternative rock band

- Picture of the band from the back cover of the Sleeper album

Background information
- Origin: Boston, Massachusetts, United States
- Genres: Alternative rock
- Years active: 1985–1994
- Labels: Rutabaga Records; Slash/Warner Bros. Records
- Spinoffs: Janet LaValley, The Vivs, Din
- Past members: Terri Barous; Eric Brosius; Janet LaValley; Greg LoPiccolo; David Penzo; Mike Levesque

Tribe was an American alternative rock band from Boston, Massachusetts, United States, which was active in the late 1980s and early 1990s. They released three albums including two on Slash Records/Warner Bros. Records. They were finalists in the 1988 WBCN Rock 'n' Roll Rumble.

However, their popularity in Boston did not translate their local appeal into national fame and they disbanded in 1994.

Greg LoPiccolo later stated that "When Warner Bros didn’t pick up our option for the third album; that was kind of a momentum-killer."

Terri Barous, now Brosius, and Eric Brosius and Greg LoPiccolo later joined video game developer Looking Glass Studios and did sound/voice/music work on various games. They would later become critical members of Guitar Hero developer Harmonix.

"Outside", a song from Here at the Home, was featured in the 2007 music video game Rock Band.

== Current status ==
Terri Brosius helped form Boston band The Vivs, where she is the keyboard player and backing vocalist. They released their debut album, "Mouth to Mouth", in 2009.

Eric Brosius is a member of the Boston bands Eddie Japan and Dark Wheels, which both feature Greg LoPiccolo's brother Bart on guitar.

Janet LaValley is co-founder and lead singer for the dark wave/indie band, Murdoch. Murdoch released their first album, "Gone", in 2021. LaValley had a song called "Jube" on the soundtrack for the movie That's What She Said.

== Members ==
- Janet LaValley: vocals, rhythm guitar (1985–1994)
- Terri Barous: keyboards, backing vocals (1985–1994)
- Eric Brosius: lead guitar, backing vocals (1985–1994)
- Greg LoPiccolo: bass, backing vocals (1985–1994)
- David Penzo: drums, percussion (1985–1994)
- Mike Levesque: drums, percussion (live shows only) (1994)

== Discography ==
=== Albums ===
- Tribe (EP) (1987)
- Here at the Home (1990)
- Abort (1991)
- Sleeper (1993)

=== Singles ===
- "Jakpot" (1990)
- "Easter Dinner" (1991)
- "Payphone"(1991)
- "Joyride (I Saw the Film)" (1991)
- "Supercollider" (1993)
- "Red Rover" (1993)

The "Payphone" single featured a cover of "Goldfinger" by Shirley Bassey on its B-Side.

=== Music Videos ===
A music video for "Joyride (I Saw the Film)" was filmed in 1991 and premiered on MTV's 120 Minutes.

A second music video, released in 1993 for "Supercollider," incorporated lyrics referencing the Superconducting Super Collider (SSC), a particle accelerator project that was underway during the song's composition but ultimately cancelled before completion.
