= Nightdive Studios =

American video game developer

Night Dive Studios, Inc.
- Trade name: Nightdive Studios
- Formerly: Night Dive Studios, LLC (2012–2019)
- Type: Subsidiary
- Industry: Video games
- Founded: November 7, 2012; 14 years ago in Portland, Oregon, US
- Founders: Stephen Kick; Alix Kick
- Headquarters: Vancouver, Washington, US
- Key people: Stephen Kick (CEO); Alix Kick (COO); Larry Kuperman (director of business development)
- Number of employees: 40 (2022)
- Parent: Atari SA (2023–present)
- Website: nightdivestudios.com

Night Dive Studios, Inc. (trade name: Nightdive Studios) is an American video game developer based in Vancouver, Washington and a subsidiary of Atari SA. The company is known for obtaining rights to abandonware video games, updating them for compatibility with modern platforms, and re-releasing them via digital distribution services, supporting preservation of older games. Many of the company's releases use the internally developed KEX Engine.

Nightdive Studios was founded in November 2012 by Stephen and Alix Kick, former video game artists for Sony Online Entertainment, after Stephen Kick was unable to purchase a copy of the 1999 game System Shock 2. He negotiated with the rightsholder Star Insurance Company, which had acquired System Shock and other assets from the defunct developer Looking Glass Studios, and Nightdive Studios re-released the game via GOG.com in February 2013. The company was acquired by Atari SA in May 2023.

== History ==
=== Founding and System Shock 2 (2012–2013) ===
Nightdive Studios was founded by Stephen Kick and his wife, Alix Kick (née Banegas), both former character artists at Sony Online Entertainment (SOE). Kick was with Sony for three years, working on Free Realms and PlanetSide 2. While Banegas had left the company earlier to establish a plushie business, Kick remained in his position until 2012. After also quitting his job, he and Banegas, then his fiancée, commenced a nine-month-long road trip from San Diego through Mexico and Central America. To pass the time during this trip, Kick brought a netbook and several classic video games to play. While staying in a hostel in Guatemala, he wished to play the 1999 game System Shock 2 but found that the CD-ROM version he had brought no longer worked on his netbook. Kick looked for fan-made patches for the game and tried purchasing an updated version via GOG.com to no avail, and he discovered that there no longer was a legal way to obtain the game. The rights to the System Shock franchise had been acquired from its defunct developer, Looking Glass Studios, by Star Insurance Company (a subsidiary of Meadowbrook Insurance Group), while the trademark was retained by the game's publisher, Electronic Arts.

Starting in October 2012, Kick sent various emails to Star Insurance Company to inquire about the status of the series' intellectual property (IP). To his surprise, the company's legal counsel responded within a few days, asking Kick what he was planning to do with the IP. Star Insurance Company had recently acquired the System Shock trademark from Electronic Arts but was wary of producing a new entry in the series given the high cost associated with such a production. Kick pitched the idea of updating System Shock 2 for modern platforms and re-releasing it via digital distribution services, including GOG.com and Steam. He argued that the game was highly sought after, as over 34,000 people had placed it onto their GOG.com wishlists, and that a re-release would be profitable. The insurer was fond of this idea, so Kick and Banegas, who had then almost reached the Panama Canal, returned to the United States. Arriving in New Mexico, Kick began phoning with Star Insurance Company's legal counsel and eventually reached a deal. He raised money from his friends and family to pay the license fee for System Shock 2 and establish a company. Subsequently, Kick and Banegas founded Night Dive Studios on November 7, 2012. Kick assumed the role of chief executive officer (CEO), while Banegas became the chief financial officer. The company name was inspired by their shared passion for diving, especially night diving, and Kick specifically recalled one night dive he had experienced in the Great Barrier Reef. Night Dive Studios was initially located in Portland, Oregon, later moving to nearby Vancouver, Washington.

Around the time of the company's foundation, a French developer known as Le Corbeau released a patch for System Shock 2 that allowed it to run on modern computers. Kick was unsuccessful in contacting the developer but still used the patch as the new version's groundwork, asserting that it was the IP holder's legal right to use it. Night Dive Studios worked with Kick's former SOE colleagues and GOG.com on updates and further bugs fixes. The updated version was released onto GOG.com in February 2013. According to Banegas, the game's returns in its first month painted Night Dive Studios as a viable business. Kick decided to continue Night Dive Studios in similar efforts to bring back older games to modern systems. The company's first hire was Daniel Grayshon, a writer of System Shock modding guides based in the United Kingdom. Night Dive Studios brought System Shock 2 to Steam in May 2013. Later that year, it released updated versions of I Have No Mouth, and I Must Scream, Harlan Ellison's 1995 game based on his eponymous short story; Wizardry VI, VII, and 8; and the Trilobyte games The 7th Guest and The 11th Hour.

=== Subsequent projects (2013–present) ===
In 2014, Night Dive Studios re-released 28 edutainment games from Humongous Entertainment, as well as the adventure game Bad Mojo. The company also generated speculation that it might be planning to re-release The Operative: No One Lives Forever, as news sources took notice of a Night Dive Studios trademark filing that included material referencing the No One Lives Forever franchise. Kick responded to these rumors by saying that the company could not comment on future releases for the time being. Kick later revealed that they had indeed been working on trying to acquire the publishing rights for both No One Lives Forever and its sequel, to the point where they had the original source code to construct a remake of the title, but could not get the three companies with stake in the games' IP, Activision, 20th Century Fox, and Warner Bros., to negotiate the rights.

In December 2014, Night Dive Studios coordinated the re-release of the 1996 first-person shooter role playing hybrid game Strife as Strife: Veteran Edition, after acquiring rights to the game. Because the game's source code had been lost, a derivative of the Chocolate Doom subproject Chocolate Strife was used as the game's engine, with its original programmers being contracted to do additional coding for the re-release. The source code of Strife: Veteran Edition was made available under a GPLv3 license on GitHub on December 12, 2014. While this was the first source code opened for a Night Dive Studios release, Kick announced his commitment in recovering, preserving and also opening of more source code in a Reddit AMA in 2016. In February 2015, Kick announced that the studio was working on re-releasing PowerSlave for digital distribution services with the bonus of porting the Sega Saturn version into the package. Kick also announced that he was working with the original developers of Noctropolis and the original source code and the updated package will feature remastered music, widescreen support and bug fixes.

Using the funds generated by past releases, Night Dive Studios acquired the System Shock IP from Star Insurance Company in August 2015, intending to create a remake of the first System Shock. The company released an enhanced version of the original game, which adds support for more resolutions and mouselook, in September that year. Night Dive Studios has since announced it has acquired full rights to the System Shock series, and are considering developing a third title in the series, as well as remakes for both previous titles, working with original concept artist Robert Waters for some of the design. In August 2015, Night Dive announced it was working on remasters for Turok: Dinosaur Hunter and Turok 2: Seeds of Evil. The first game was released in 2015, followed by the sequel in 2017. In December 2015, the company had licensed the System Shock IP to OtherSide Entertainment, headed by former Looking Glass Studios creative director Paul Neurath, for the development of System Shock 3. In May 2016, Night Dive Studios rebranded as Nightdive Studios.

Nightdive had considered a remaster of the Nintendo 64 title Goldeneye 007, and had secured the rights for the James Bond properties from Metro-Goldwyn-Mayer and Eon Productions, but failed to secure Nintendo's own permission. Nintendo independently re-released GoldenEye in 2023 via Nintendo Classics.

=== Acquisition by Atari (2023–present) ===
In March 2023, Atari SA announced that it had agreed to acquire Nightdive Studios for US$10 million. The price is to be paid half in cash and half in newly issued ordinary shares, with a possible earnout of $10 million in cash over three years. Wade Rosen, Atari's CEO and chairman, had previously bought 13% of Nightdive Studios under his company Wade J. Rosen Revocable Trust. Atari expected the acquisition to be completed in April 2023. It was finalized on May 15.

Nightdive released a remaster of Turok 3: Shadow of Oblivion in November 2023. The game's original source code had been lost, so the developers had to reverse engineer the N64 version and update the textures. Initially due to be released on November 14, Turok 3 was delayed to November 30 shortly before the intended release. Despite the announced delay, the game went live in Europe and Australia on the 14th by mistake, leading to the game launching with major bugs.

id Software worked with Nightdive to create remasters of Doom and Doom II, both which were surprise-released ahead of the 2024 QuakeCon event in August. Both games were updated for modern computers and consoles, with support for cross-platform multiplayer and local split-screen and co-op modes, and mod support. id and Nightdive did the same surprise release of remasters of Heretic and Hexen: Beyond Heretic for the 2025 QuakeCon event.

== Operations ==
Nightdive Studios is headquartered out of the Kicks' house in eastern Vancouver, Washington. As of February 2022, the company employs 40 people, including Larry Kuperman as the director of business development. Most staff work remotely, with locations including San Francisco and New Zealand. According to Kick, this distribution allows the studio to operate "on pretty much a 24/7 basis", while employees collaborate via GitHub, Jira, and Slack. However, he noted that this setup also caused a lack of in-office socializing and camaraderie.

Because of their reputation, the studio is often approached for remastering projects from other studios, but the studio itself still selects which titles they want to work on, with only about three titles in the 14-month long development process at any time. Kick used the studio's remasters of niche 3DO titles PO'ed and Killing Time as examples of projects that they took on because of interest from their own staff, as well as aiming to support video game preservation.

== Technology ==
While researching for the development of an updated version of Turok: Dinosaur Hunter, Nightdive Studios became aware of a reverse engineering project of the game's Nintendo 64 version by Sam "Kaiser" Villarreal. The company hired him and developed his custom game engine into the KEX Engine, allowing the developers to add modern features to older games and port the game to multiple platforms including consoles and mobile devices. The KEX Engine remains the studio's primary tool for their releases as of 2025, with Villarreal and other staff continued to refine the engine.

== Games ==
=== Original releases ===
Year	Title	Developer(s)	Publisher(s)
2015	Spirits of Xanadu	Good Morning, Commander	Nightdive Studios
2016	Womb Room	Bearded Eye	Nightdive Studios
2023	System Shock	Nightdive Studios	Prime Matter, Atari, Nightdive Studios
2024	Doom II: Legacy of Rust	id Software, Nightdive Studios, MachineGames	Bethesda Softworks
2025	Heretic: Faith Renewed	id Software, Nightdive Studios	Bethesda Softworks
2025	Hexen: Vestiges of Grandeur	id Software, Nightdive Studios	Bethesda Softworks

=== Remasters and enhanced ports ===
Year	Title	Original developer(s)	Publisher(s)
2014	Strife: Veteran Edition	Rogue Entertainment	Nightdive Studios
2015	Noctropolis	Flashpoint Productions	Nightdive Studios
2015	System Shock: Enhanced Edition	LookingGlass Technologies	Nightdive Studios
2015	Turok: Dinosaur Hunter	Iguana Entertainment	Nightdive Studios
2017	Turok 2: Seeds of Evil	Iguana Entertainment	Nightdive Studios
2018	Forsaken Remastered	Probe Entertainment	Nightdive Studios
2019	Blood: Fresh Supply	Monolith Productions	Nightdive Studios, Atari
2020	Doom 64	Midway Studios San Diego	Bethesda Softworks
2021	Shadow Man Remastered	Acclaim Studios Teesside	Nightdive Studios
2021	Quake	id Software	Bethesda Softworks
2022	PowerSlave Exhumed	Lobotomy Software	Nightdive Studios, Throwback Entertainment
2022	Blade Runner: Enhanced Edition	Westwood Studios	Nightdive Studios
2023	Rise of the Triad: Ludicrous Edition	Apogee Software	New Blood Interactive, Apogee Entertainment, Nightdive Studios
2023	Quake II	id Software	Bethesda Softworks
2023	Turok 3: Shadow of Oblivion Remastered	Acclaim Studios Austin	Nightdive Studios
2024	Star Wars: Dark Forces Remaster	LucasArts	Nightdive Studios
2024	PO'ed: Definitive Edition	Any Channel	Nightdive Studios
2024	Doom + Doom II	id Software	Bethesda Softworks
2024	Killing Time: Resurrected	The 3DO Company	Nightdive Studios, Ziggurat Interactive
2024	The Thing: Remastered	Computer Artworks	Nightdive Studios
2025	I Have No Mouth, and I Must Scream	Cyberdreams	Nightdive Studios
2025	System Shock 2: 25th Anniversary Remaster	Irrational Games, Looking Glass Studios	Nightdive Studios
2025	Heretic + Hexen	id Software, Raven Software	Bethesda Softworks
2025	Outlaws + Handful of Missions: Remaster	LucasArts	Nightdive Studios, Atari, Lucasfilm Games
2025	Blood: Refreshed Supply	Monolith Productions	Nightdive Studios, Atari, Warner Bros. Games
2026	SiN Reloaded	Ritual Entertainment	Nightdive Studios, Atari
2026	Thief: The Dark Project Remastered	Looking Glass Studios	Nightdive Studios, Atari
