= Eric Brosius =

American actor

- Education: Berklee College of Music (BM)
- Occupations: Musician; video game developer
- Member of: Eddie Japan; Dark Wheels
- Formerly of: Tribe
- Spouse: Terri Brosius

Eric Brosius is a musician and video game developer, and a former employee of Looking Glass Studios. He is a former member of the band Tribe and is married to Terri Brosius. He is currently a member of the bands Eddie Japan and Dark Wheels.

Brosius is best known within the video game industry for his sound design and music work in several Looking Glass Studios, Irrational Games, and Ion Storm games, particularly the Thief series. He was the audio lead for games made by Harmonix.

He has contributed music and sound design for games including Terra Nova: Strike Force Centauri, System Shock 2, and the Thief series, along with Guitar Hero, SWAT 4, and Freedom Force vs. the 3rd Reich.

Brosius completed a bachelor of music degree at Berklee College of Music in 1983.
