= Immersive sim =

Video game genre

An immersive sim (simulation) is a video game genre that emphasizes player choice. Its core defining trait is the use of simulated systems that respond to a variety of player actions, which combined with a comparatively broad array of player abilities allow the game to support varied and creative solutions to problems as well as emergent gameplay beyond what has been explicitly designed by the developer. This definition is not to be confused with game systems which allow player choice in a confined sense or systems which allow players to easily escape consequences of their choices.

Immersive sims by definition allow for multiple approaches and typically incorporate elements of multiple genres including role-playing games, stealth, first-person shooters, platform games, survival horror and adventure games. Although they typically have smaller worlds than open world games, they also generally allow for open-ended gameplay, allowing the player to progress in any order and pursue side missions alongside any main story missions. Immersive sims are generally compared to games developed by Looking Glass Studios. The first such game generally considered an immersive sim is Ultima Underworld: The Stygian Abyss, and other early examples include Thief: The Dark Project and Thief II: The Metal Age, System Shock and System Shock 2, as well as the first Deus Ex.

The term "immersive sim" emerged in the 2000s and began to be used regularly in the second half of the 2010s, often applied retroactively to the earlier entries in the genre. It may also be used to describe the set of game design principles behind the immersive sim genre, which uses interacting, reactive and consistent game systems to create emergent gameplay and a sense of player agency.

== Concept ==
Immersive sims typically task the player to make their way through levels and complete missions, but do not enforce the means by which the player does this. A common example would be where the player-character must get past a guard. The choice of how to do this would be up to the player: they may attempt to sneak around; use parkour or other similar abilities, aided with some equipment, to slip around them; find small passageways that allow them to get around the guard; create a distraction that draws the guard away from their post; convince or bribe the guard to ignore them; or simply attack and kill or disable the guard directly. The choices may be limited by the player-character's abilities and current inventory, and there may be consequences of the player's choice. For example, killing or disabling the guard could leave the guard's body to be found later, raising the alert level of other guards. However, this element of consequence can be seen as a negative to players if taken throughout the game. For example, Dishonored introduced a "chaos" system that adjusted how enemy guards would behave based on how much violence and disturbance a player had used earlier in the game so as to encourage players to try different tactics to avoid making future encounters harder. This system was removed for Dishonored: Death of the Outsider, as well as the addition of optional quests to encourage alternate approaches to missions.

Warren Spector, part of Looking Glass Studios, said that immersive sims create the feeling that "you are there, nothing stands between you and belief that you're in an alternate world". Many of the key developers of immersive sims compare them to tabletop Dungeons & Dragons games hosted by a good gamemaster, or to live action role-playing games, in that there are a set of rule systems to keep it a game, but the game will react to the players' actions rather than force the player to conform to a specific action. Spector is credited with the term "immersive sim" in a post-mortem he wrote on the development of Deus Ex in 2000, although Spector himself attributes it to his Looking Glass colleague Doug Church instead.

Mark Brown of the YouTube series Game Maker's Toolkit identified that a key differentiating feature of immersive sims is that they do not readily use scripted or fixed events. Instead, they use a consistent series of rules and systems throughout the game. These consistent systems then can be exploited by the player to complete objectives in unique and unpredictable ways, with the game reacting to the player's decisions. Brown uses the example of being able to fire rope arrows (to climb on) at any wooden surface in the original Thief: The Dark Project (1998), while the 2014 Thief game limited what locations these could be used, removing the immersive sim elements. Rick Lane of PC Gamer noted that while earlier games in The Elder Scrolls series were not immersive sims, The Elder Scrolls IV: Oblivion (2006) transitioned the series to an immersive sim.

== History ==
Warren Spector considered Ultima VI: The False Prophet (1990) the first game to have an immersive sim mentality as while played from a top-down view, it relied less on events and planned-out puzzles, and instead provided the rulesets and systems through its living world to allow players to craft their own solutions to situations. Spector described one playtesting example from Ultima VI that he considered the genesis of the immersive sim genre, in which a playtester lacked a magical spell needed by his party to pass by a closed gate, and instead used a pet mouse character to sneak through small spaces and access the necessary controls to open the gate, something none of the developers had anticipated.

Ultima Underworld: The Stygian Abyss (1992) is considered the first game to demonstrate the necessary elements of an immersive sim according to Spector and others. It built upon Ultima VI's gameplay and added in the first-person perspective, predating Wolfenstein 3D, the game that first popularized first-person shooters, by a few months. The first-person view helped to cement the impression that the player was part of the game's world that they had full control of, and completing the impression of immersion. Spector recalled that he had thought to himself "Do you not realize that the entire world just changed?" on seeing the initial demo for Ultima Underworld. Other early examples include System Shock (1994) and its sequel System Shock 2 (1999), Thief: The Dark Project (1998) and its sequel Thief II: The Metal Age (2000), Deus Ex (2000), and Arx Fatalis (2002). However, at the same time, more action-oriented games with strong narrative elements that followed from Wolfenstein 3D, like Doom (1993) and Half-Life (1998), drew larger commercial sales, making it difficult to gain publisher interest.

In the late 2000s, several games emerged that revitalized interest in the immersive sim, including The Elder Scrolls IV: Oblivion (2006), BioShock (2007), S.T.A.L.K.E.R.: Shadow of Chernobyl (2007) and Fallout 3 (2008). Spurred from these successful titles, there have been new titles in the Deus Ex series (Deus Ex: Human Revolution (2011), Deus Ex: Mankind Divided (2016)), the Underworld series (Underworld Ascendant (2018)). The genre's popularity continued with major releases from Arkane Studios (Dishonored (2012), Prey (2017) and Deathloop (2021)). White Paper Games' The Occupation (2019) and WolfEye Studios' Weird West (2022), were developed acknowledging the design principles of immersive sims. Other titles in this period, such as the Hitman series, and The Legend of Zelda: Breath of the Wild (2017) and its sequel Tears of the Kingdom (2023), while not necessarily considered immersive sims, have been said to possess elements of the genre, given their "sufficiently advanced physics engine/systems that interact with both player verbs and mechanics and level design" and emphasis on player freedom and emergent gameplay.

=== Performance in the industry ===
While the immersive sim genre is well-received critically, its performance within the video game industry tends to be poor and sales of immersive sim games have been varying. The original Deus Ex sold more than 500,000 units (at the time, a respectable number) but its immediate sequel, Deus Ex: Invisible War was considered a commercial failure. More recently, while Deus Ex: Human Revolution sold more than 2.1 million copies within a month of its release, its sequel Deus Ex: Mankind Divided had not yet cleared one million in sales a year after its release. Dishonored 2 also did not see a sales uptake similar to the one the original Dishonored had. System Shock 2 only sold about 58,000 units eight months after release, in contrast to System Shock's 170,000 units. As a result of poor sales of System Shock 2 and Thief from its multimillion dollar budgets, Looking Glass suffered mounting debts and closed down in May 2000. Irrational Games still wanted to make System Shock 3, but Electronic Arts, which held the publishing rights to the franchise, felt sales of the second were not sufficient to justify a sequel, leading Irrational to make a spiritual successor that shared the same concepts but avoided the intellectual property rights issues in BioShock.

Jody Macgregor of PC Gamer noted that there are other factors contributing towards lower sales – including other competing games and changes in a sequel's marketing and approach. He also states that immersive sims require more commitment from the player to invest and learn the game's complex interacting systems in contrast to other types of games built around simpler mechanics thus making immersive sims harder to sell. Jordan Thomas, a developer on Thief and the BioShock games also said in 2017 that immersive sims are very difficult to be built by groups other than large teams due to the complexity of such games – making contributions from indie games unlikely. Polygon's Cass Marshall identified that some indie developers were able to create successive immersive sims by single-person or small teams, including Shadows of Doubt, Corpus Edax and Ctrl Alt Ego.

Arkane's Harvey Smith believed that while the sales trends for immersive sims in the 2010s were disappointing, there will always be a market for them but there will be a need to balance the cost of development to lower sales numbers. Smith attributes the lower sales of more recent games to the general trend of players favoring fast-paced action games with strong multiplayer components – with publishers being wary of games without such elements. Immersive sims by nature tend to be single-player experiences requiring thought-out approaches but Smith believes that the new titles will adapt to these player preferences in the future, particularly from indie developers. Dave Oshry, CEO of New Blood Interactive which released games with immersive sim features like Gloomwood and Fallen Aces, purposely avoided using "immersive sim" language to market their titles, saying that the term is "awful" for marketing, and that using more well-defined genre terms like "stealth game" or "role-playing game" are better for marketing purposes.

== Lineage ==
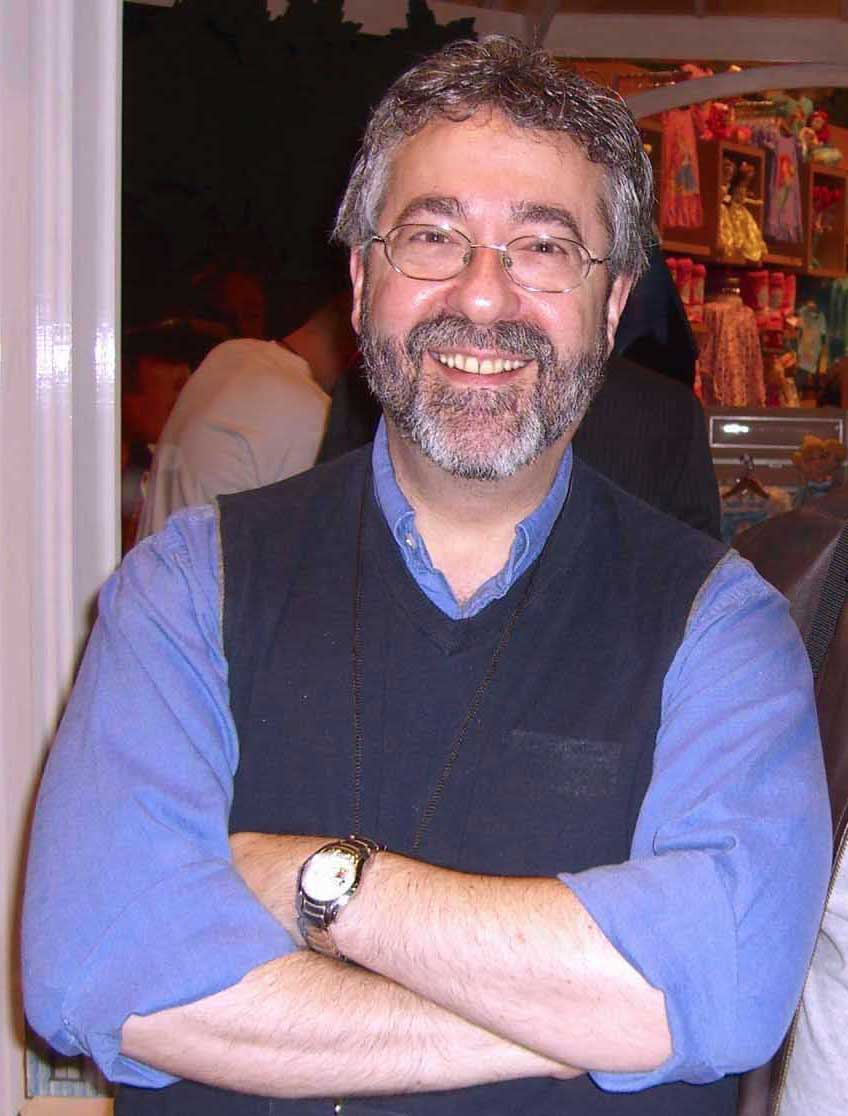
Warren Spector is one of the key figures that defined the immersive sim genre.

A small number of studios and developers have been associated with the immersive sim genre, creating a lineage in its development originating from Looking Glass Studios and its projects. Ultima Underworld was created by Paul Neurath and Doug Church, under their studio Blue Sky Productions and published by Origin Systems. Warren Spector of Origin (who had worked on Ultima VI) also worked closely with Blue Sky to finalize the game – which eventually transitioned into Looking Glass and created System Shock 2 and Thief. Spector later joined Ion Storm and founded its Austin, Texas studio where they developed the Deus Ex series. Looking Glass Studios eventually closed down but developers from it launched their own studios – notably Ken Levine who had helped with Thief and System Shock 2 left to form Irrational Games and create the BioShock series (which has been described as a spiritual sequel to the System Shock games). Following the release of BioShock Infinite, Levine significantly pared back Irrational Games to reform under a new name, Ghost Story Games, as to explore a new approach towards storytelling. However, Jason Schreier observed that many of those that had worked on the BioShock series at Irrational or other related studios often ended up either at existing studios or created their own studios that made their own immersive sim take on BioShock and continued this lineage.

Separately, Raphaël Colantonio had been part of the quality assurance team supporting Origin Systems for Electronic Arts (EA) in publishing games like System Shock in Europe. Colantonio left EA and eventually founded Arkane Studios, desiring to make an immersive sim sequel to the Ultima Underworld series. EA denied them the use of the intellectual property and instead Arkane produced Arx Fatalis. Later, Colantonio brought on Harvey Smith (a quality assurance tester for Origin for System Shock and one of the lead developers under Ion Storm for Deus Ex) and they subsequently designed the Dishonored series as well as building the new Prey atop similar immersive sim fundamentals. More recently, Neurath founded a new studio, OtherSide Entertainment obtaining the rights for an Underworld sequel from EA and for the System Shock property through Night Dive Studios whom also had acquired the rights from EA. Neurath brought on Spector to help create both sequels.

Many immersive sims that feature numeric passwords (such as BioShock, Prey, and Deathloop) use 451 or 0451 as part of the first code that the player encounters. This is in reference to System Shock games, which use it as part of the first door codes seen in the game; it is sometimes believed to be a reference to the Ray Bradbury novel Fahrenheit 451, though Spector stated in 2019 that this was not the case and that the code was used simply because it was the security code for the door of Looking Glass' studios in Cambridge. However, former Looking Glass programmer Marc LeBlanc said in 2023 that the code had originally been a Bradbury reference and that the studio's door code was set in reference to the game. Since then, the number's recurrence in immersive sims and various other games (such as Call of Duty: Modern Warfare, Firewatch, and The Last of Us Part II) has been described former Looking Glass developer Tim Stellmach as "kind of a signature that developers use to align themselves with Looking Glass". The name of Looking Glass is also played upon by developers of immersive sims to reflect on the importance of the seminal studio to the genre; for example, OtherSide Entertainment's name (playing on the title of Lewis Carroll's book Through the Looking-Glass) and Prey having the Looking Glass computer system that the player encounters frequently.
