= Doug Church =

American video game designer and producer (born 1968)

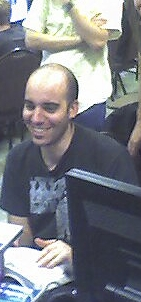
- Church tests an Indie Game Jam 2005 project.
- Born: November 16, 1968 (age 57); Evanston, Illinois, United States
- Occupations: Game designer, producer

Doug Church (born November 16, 1968, in Evanston, Illinois) is an American video game designer and producer. He started out at MIT in the late 1980s. Instead of finishing up there, he left and joined Looking Glass Studios, where the team was producing MS-DOS-based immersive sim games like Ultima Underworld, Ultima Underworld II, System Shock and the Thief series. His colleague Warren Spector has pointed out that Church was likely the one who first came up with the term "immersive simulation".

Later, Church joined Eidos Interactive as Technical Director, lending programming and design support across a series of titles from Ion Storm and Crystal Dynamics, including Tomb Raider: Legend. He left Eidos in 2005 and headed to Electronic Arts.

In 2003, the International Game Developers Association gave him its Community Contribution award. Part of that nod went to his time co-chairing the IGDA's educational committee and helping build links between the game industry and academia. He became a regular participant at Indie Game Jam events over the years, including putting together "Angry God Bowling" as an IGJ prototype.

In 2009, IGN listed him among the top 100 game creators of all time.

From July 2005 to 2009, Church worked at Electronic Arts' Los Angeles office as team leader on a project supervised by filmmaker Steven Spielberg.

On March 16, 2011, Valve announced that Church had been hired for an undisclosed position and project. He remained there for several years before moving on.

In August 2016, OtherSide Entertainment announced that Church had been hired as a creative consultant for the development of System Shock 3. More recently, he has served as project leader on Nightdive Studios' 2023 remake of the original System Shock. He has also received credits on Valve's 2022 Portal: Companion Collection, as well as Embark Studios titles The Finals and ARC Raiders.

== Games ==
Year	Title	Role
1992	Ultima Underworld: The Stygian Abyss	Programmer, additional support
1993	Ultima Underworld II: Labyrinth of Worlds	Lead programmer, designer, additional support
1994	System Shock	Lead programmer
1995	Flight Unlimited	Programmer
1996	Terra Nova: Strike Force Centauri	Programmer
1997	Flight Unlimited II	Programmer, additional support
1998	Thief: The Dark Project	Programmer
1999	System Shock 2	Programmer
2000	Thief II: The Metal Age	Engine programmer
2001	FreQuency	"Synth and Related Playstation 2 Voodoo"
2001	Deus Ex: Game of the Year Edition	Design, additional programming
2002	Freedom Force	Special thanks
2003	Whiplash	Special thanks
2003	Deus Ex: Invisible War	Special thanks
2003	Backyard Wrestling: Don't Try This at Home	Special thanks
2004	Thief: Deadly Shadows	Special thanks
2006	Tomb Raider: Legend	Design
2012	Counter-Strike: Global Offensive	
