= Mosa Lina =

2023 video game

- Developers: Stuffed Wombat, Silkersoft, Lukke, Rollin'Barrel, Anton Klinger (Switch port)
- Publishers: Stuffed Wombat; Accidently Awesome (Switch)
- Platforms: Windows, Linux, macOS, Nintendo Switch
- Release: Windows; October 17, 2023; Linux; October 20, 2023; macOS; January 30, 2024; Switch; May 28, 2025
- Genres: Platformer, physics game, immersive sim
- Modes: Single-player, multiplayer

Mosa Lina is a 2D physics puzzle platformer created by indie developer Stuffed Wombat. It was released on the PC in 2023, and ported to macOS the following year and to the Nintendo Switch in 2025. The game describes itself as a "hostile interpretation" of an immersive sim, in which the player solves open-ended physics and platforming puzzles using random selections of special tools and items.

== Gameplay ==
In Mosa Lina, the player's goal is to collect one or more fruits scattered throughout each level and reach an exit portal, while avoiding obstacles or going off-screen. The fruits are physics objects, and can be either touched directly by the player character or pushed out of the level to count.

Similar to roguelikes, the game creates a set of nine levels at the start of a new run, generated from a large pre-made set that are then modified by randomly placing the exit, enabling or disabling physics on certain platforms, and adding additional obstacles like falling spiked blocks. When the player dies, they respawn in another random level in the current run that has not been completed, until they are left with one level which becomes the special 'boss' level, which is further modified with additional sections, boxes that provide additional tools, and more fruit that must be collected to complete the run.

The player can use the different physics tools to traverse and manipulate the levels.

Also at the start of every run, the game selects nine special tools from a pool of 48, and the player is randomly assigned three of those tools each time they spawn into a level. These tools can be used to help collect the fruit and reach the exit, though each tool can only be used a limited number of times. These range from physics objects the player can deploy, such as boxes and floating balls, to a field that inverts gravity or a butterfly that teleports the player forward and teleports them back to the butterfly's location a few seconds later. The interactions between the tools and the game's physics engine allow the player to experiment with emergent and creative solutions to each level, which otherwise do not have a single intended solution - in fact, it is possible that the player is unable to actually solve the level with their current tools, requiring them to try again with another set of tools later or restart the run entirely. In this way, the chaotic design of the game's items bucks the trend of common "lock and key" design philosophy seen in traditional immersive sims, where special abilities are often made to overcome specific obstacles.

Mosa Lina features an abstract and minimalist pixel art style alongside an ambient electronic soundtrack, and no plot, which has been described as giving it a surreal, dream-like atmosphere.

In addition to single-player, the game can be played in local or online co-op, and features a level editor that can be used to create custom levels which can be uploaded to the Steam Workshop or shared cross-platform in-game.

== Development ==
Developer Stuffed Wombat is based in Austria. According to him, the name Mosa Lina was chosen due to his background in experimental game designer circles whose games are often "completely SEO anti-optimized", and to be "the opposite of the Da Vinci painting, this pristine and static thing that everyone knows by heart and is supposed to admire", a declaration "of war on perfection and smoothness and general likeability", which was a guiding principle from the game's earliest development stages. Stuffed Wombat created several prototypes just for the game's movement with the goal of having very forgiving edge control and collision for the player character. Hip-hop producer Silkersoft made the game's sound effects and music based on the early prototypes' visuals (which were darker and more barren than the final game), creating an alien, horror-like soundscape, while Stuffed Wombat pushed for the audio direction to be similar to the work of English ambient musician The Caretaker. While the final game features no story or worldbuilding whatsoever, the player character was supposed to be an astronaut in earlier iterations.

The game received a number of free updates after release, adding extra features such as more tools and levels, the level editor, co-op gameplay, and a speedrun mode. A number of features such as the ability to backflip or to encounter gravity-altering moon blocks were originally available by default, then removed, then re-added again as optional but disabled by default.

== Reception ==
Mark Brown of Game Maker's Toolkit says that "developer Stuffed Wombat sees Mosa Lina as a response or commentary on modern takes on immersive sims like Deathloop or Dishonored", where "abilities can feel less like emergent problem-solving tools and more like keys to open locks", saying that "Mosa Lina pushes back against that rigid puzzle-piece mentality and makes for a game where it's entirely up to you to find the right solution", and the game's varied tools, robust physics simulation, and randomness "lead to a game where I found myself creating clever and imaginative strategies over and over again", "the sort of memorable and emergent stories that you might get one or two times when playing through a typical immersive sim, but I had them every few minutes when playing Mosa Lina."

Writing for Sensatez, William Hernandez states that "as a puzzle, physics-based platformer, it's not exactly the kind of game that'll pop out in any significant way. The game's trailers might vaguely show off the game's quirkiness, but it's impossible to fully appreciate Mosa Lina until you're actually playing it. The game knows exactly what it wants to be, and it's impressive how much personality it can convey. Mosa Lina is experimental. Its formula isn't without flaws, but it definitely makes for a great game."
