= Toon Silly Stuff =

Supplement for Toon

- Cover art by Kyle Miller
- Designers: Allen Varney; Kyle Miller; Caroline Chase; Warren Spector
- Illustrators: Kyle Milelr
- Publishers: Steve Jackson Games
- Publication: 1985
- Genres: Cartoon RPG

Toon Silly Stuff is a supplement published by Steve Jackson Games in 1985 for the comic character role-playing game Toon.

== Contents ==
Toon Silly Stuff is a supplement in which various cartoony locations are detailed like haunted houses and outer space, along with descriptions of standard cartoon characters. It also contains an "Adventure Generator" table for the gamemaster to create instant adventure scenarios.

The book has four sections:

1. "Places to Go": Ten locations where characters can wreak havoc, such as a robot factory, a bakery, a zoo, or a hardware store. As well as maps of each location, the gamemaster is provided with absurd things that could happen to characters at each location.
2. "People to See": Descriptions of nine archetypal cartoon characters, as well as Foogle birds, a family of ghosts and Martians.
3. "Things to Do": Four short adventures, as well as a Toon Adventure Generator that allows the gamemaster to set up an adventure with a few dice rolls.
4. "Charts & Tables": Various random tables such as disguises, crazy animals, and bottle contents.

== Publication history ==
Inspired by the 1981 novel Who Censored Roger Rabbit? (later made into the 1988 movie Who Framed Roger Rabbit), Steve Jackson Games published the absurdist cartoon role-playing game Toon in 1984, and followed it with several supplements, including the 40-page softcover book Toon Silly Stuff, which was published in 1985. It was written by Allen Varney, Kyle Miller, Caroline Chase, and Warren Spector, with cover and interior art by Kyle Miller.

In 1991, Toon Silly Stuff was combined with Toon and several other supplements in Deluxe Edition Toon.

== Reception ==
In Issue 39 of Abyss, Mark Teller called this "just what I like to see in a supplement. It has a variety of types of material in a compact package ... The text is clearly presented and the general tone is in keeping with the cartoon theme of the game."

In Issue 184 of Dragon, Rick Swan gave it a rating of 3.5 out of 5, writing, "it's worth a look from anyone who's ever laughed out loud at Daffy Duck or empathized with Wile E. Coyote.

In Issue 38 of Animato!, Partrick Duquette wrote, "I can't think of anyone among our enthusiastic readers who wouldn't enjoy this game. Pump up the Carl Stalling Project on the stereo and practice your Marvin Martian voice!"
