= Ultima Underworld: The Stygian Abyss =

1992 first-person role-playing video game

- Cover art by Denis R. Loubet
- Developer: Blue Sky Productions
- Publisher: Origin Systems (Note: Published in Japan by Electronic Arts Victor)
- Director: Richard Garriott
- Producer: Warren Spector
- Designer: Paul Neurath
- Programmers: Jonathan Arnold; Doug Church; Jon Maiara; Dan Schmidt; Carlos Smith
- Artists: Carol Angell; Douglas Wike
- Writers: Brad Freeman; Dan Schmidt
- Composers: George Sanger; Dave Govett
- Series: Ultima
- Platforms: DOS: FM Towns; PC-98; PlayStation; Windows Mobile
- Release: March 21, 1992: DOS; NA: March 21, 1992; FM Towns; JP: December 1993; PC-98; JP: December 17, 1993; PlayStation; JP: March 14, 1997; Windows Mobile; NA: May 29, 2002
- Genre: Action role-playing
- Mode: Single-player

Ultima Underworld: The Stygian Abyss is a 1992 action role-playing game developed by Blue Sky Productions (later Looking Glass Studios) and published by Origin Systems. Set in the fantasy world of the Ultima series the story takes place inside the Great Stygian Abyss: a large cave system that contains the remnants of a failed utopian civilization. The player assumes the role of the Avatar—the Ultima series's protagonist—and attempts to find and rescue a baron's kidnapped daughter.

Ultima Underworld has been cited as the first role-playing game to feature first-person action in a 3D environment, and it introduced technological innovations such as allowing the player to look up and down. Its design combines simulation elements with concepts from earlier role-playing video games, including Wizardry and Dungeon Master, which led the game's designers to call it a "dungeon simulation". As such, the game is non-linear and allows for emergent gameplay.

Ultima Underworld sold nearly 500,000 units, and was placed on numerous hall of fame lists. It influenced game developers such as Bethesda Softworks and Valve, and it was an inspiration behind the games Deus Ex and BioShock. The game had a sequel, Ultima Underworld II: Labyrinth of Worlds (1993), and a new game in the series, Underworld Ascendant, was released in late 2018.

== Gameplay ==
Ultima Underworld is a role-playing video game (RPG) that takes place from a first-person perspective in a three-dimensional environment. The player's goal is to adventure through a large, multi-level dungeon, in which the entire game is set. The player uses a freely movable mouse cursor to interact with the game's world, and with the icon-based interface on the heads-up display (HUD). Each icon has a specific effect; for example, the player uses the Look icon to examine objects closely, while the Fight icon readies the weapons of the player character. The player's progression through the game is non-linear: areas may be explored, and puzzles and quests finished, in any order. An automatically filling map, to which the player may add notes, records what the player has seen above a minimum level of brightness. The player character may carry light sources to extend the line of sight in varying amounts. Exploratory actions include looking up and down, jumping, and swimming.

A goblin walks up an inclined surface. The player has selected the Fight icon, causing the player character's current weapon, a fist, to appear at the bottom of the screen.

The player begins the game by creating a character, for whom traits such as gender, class and skills may be selected. Skills range from fighting with an axe, to bartering, to picking locks. By participating in combat, quests and exploration, the character gains experience points. When certain amounts of experience points are accumulated, the character levels up, gaining additional hit points and mana. Experience is required to recite mantras at shrines in the game. Each mantra is a statement—such as "Om Cah"—that increases proficiency in a specific skill when typed. Simple mantras are provided in the game's manual, while more complex ones are hidden throughout the game. An inventory on the HUD lists the items and weapons carried by the player character; carrying capacity is limited by weight. Players equip items via a paper doll system, wherein items are clicked-and-dragged onto a representation of the player character.

Combat occurs in real-time, and the player character may use both melee and ranged weapons. The player attacks by holding the cursor over the game screen and clicking, depressing the button longer to inflict greater damage. Some weapons allow for different types of attacks depending on where the cursor is held; for example, clicking near the bottom of the screen may result in a jab, while clicking in the middle produces a slash. Simulated dice rolls occur behind the scenes to determine weapon accuracy. Enemies sometimes try to escape when near death, and the game's stealth mechanics may occasionally be used to avoid combat altogether. The player may cast spells by selecting an appropriate combination of runestones. Like mantras, runestones must be found in the game world before use. There are over forty spells, some undocumented; their effects range from causing earthquakes to flight.

The developers intended Ultima Underworld to be a realistic and interactive "dungeon simulation", rather than a straightforward role-playing video game. For example, many objects in the game have no actual use, while a lit torch may be used on corn to create popcorn. Weapons deteriorate with use, and the player character must eat and rest; light sources burn out unless extinguished before sleeping. A physics system allows, among other things, for items to bounce when thrown against surfaces. The game contains non-player characters (NPCs) with whom the player may interact by selecting dialogue choices from a menu. Most NPCs have possessions, and are willing to trade them. The game was designed to give players "a palette of strategies" with which to approach situations, and its simulation systems allow for emergent gameplay.

== Plot ==
=== Setting ===
Ultima Underworld is set in Britannia, the fantasy world of the Ultima series. Specifically, the game takes place inside a large, underground dungeon called the Great Stygian Abyss. The dungeon's entrance lies on the Isle of the Avatar, an island ruled by Baron Almric. The Abyss first appeared in Ultima IV: Quest of the Avatar, in which it contains the player's final goal, the Codex of Ultimate Wisdom.

Ultima Underworld is set after the events of Ultima VI: The False Prophet; in the time between the two games, a man named Cabirus attempted to create a utopian colony inside the Abyss. The eight settlements of the Ultima series each embody one of eight virtues, and Cabirus wished to create a ninth that embodied all virtues. To achieve this, he united diverse cultures and races in peaceful co-existence and planned to promote harmony by giving each group one of eight virtue-imbued magical artifacts. However, he died before distributing the artifacts, and left no instructions for doing so. As a result, the colony collapsed into anarchy and war, and the artifacts were lost. At the time of Ultima Underworld, the Abyss contains the remnants of Cabirus's colony, inhabited by fractious groups of humans, goblins, trolls and others.

=== Story ===
Before the beginning of the game, the Abyss-dwelling wizard brothers Garamon and Tyball accidentally summon a demon, the Slasher of Veils, while experimenting with inter-dimensional travel. Garamon is used as bait to lure the demon into a room imbued with virtue. However, the demon offers Tyball great power if he betrays Garamon. Tyball agrees, but the betrayal fails; Garamon is killed, but seals the demon inside the room. Because he lacks virtue, Tyball cannot re-enter by himself, and plans to sacrifice Baron Almric's daughter, Arial, at the doorway to gain entrance.

In the game's introduction, the ghost of Garamon haunts the Avatar's dreams with warnings of a great danger in Britannia. The Avatar allows Garamon to take him there, where he watches Tyball kidnap Arial. Tyball escapes, leaving the Avatar to be caught by the Baron's guards. The guards take him to the Baron, who banishes him to the Great Stygian Abyss to rescue Arial. After the introduction, the Avatar explores the dungeon and finds remnants of Cabirus's colony. A few possible scenarios include deciding the fate of two warring goblin tribes, learning a language, and playing an instrument to complete a quest. The Avatar eventually defeats Tyball and frees Arial.

However, as he dies, Tyball reveals that he had decided to contain the Slasher of Veils, whose prison he had been weakening, within Arial as a way to prevent it from destroying the world. Arial asks the Avatar to prevent the Slasher of Veils from being unleashed, and magically teleports back to the surface to evacuate its inhabitants. With help from Garamon's ghost, the Avatar gathers the eight talismans of Cabirus and throws them in the volcano at the base of the Abyss; Garamon's spirit uses the energy they release to open a portal and send the Slasher of Veils into another dimension. The Avatar is sucked through the portal into a chaotic alternate dimension, but escapes back to the Isle of the Avatar and makes it on board the Baron's ship as the volcano erupts. As the game ends, Garamon's spirit reveals that he teleported the inhabitants of the Abyss to another cave.

== Development ==
Ultima Underworld was conceived in 1989 by Origin Systems employee Paul Neurath. He had just completed work on Space Rogue, a hybrid title that features sequences both of 2D tile-based role-playing and of 3D space flight simulation. According to Neurath, Space Rogue "took the first, tentative steps in exploring a blend of RPG and simulation elements, and this seemed to me a promising direction." He felt that the way it combined the elements was jarring, however, and believed that he could create a more immersive experience.

I had played lots of D&D. I also read a range of fantasy: Howard, Leiber, Vance, Zelazny, Le Guin, and of course, Tolkien. Tolkien's description of Moria struck me in particular, and it seemed like a fine setting for a game.

— Paul Neurath

Neurath had enjoyed role-playing video games like Wizardry, but found that their simple, abstract visuals were an obstacle to the suspension of disbelief. He believed that Dungeon Master's detailed first-person presentation was a "glimpse into the future", and he sought to create a fantasy role-playing game that built on its example. In early 1990, Neurath wrote a design document for a game titled Underworld, which described such elements as "goblins on the prows of rowboats tossed in the waves, shooting arrows at the player above on a rope bridge swinging in the wind." He contracted former Origin employee Doug Wike to create concept art. Wike created a brief, hand-drawn animation with Deluxe Paint Animation, which depicted the game's interface and a creature moving toward the player. The animation defined the game's direction, and it was used as a reference point for the game's tone and features throughout development. That spring, Neurath founded the company Blue Sky Productions in Salem, New Hampshire, with the intention to create Underworld. Among the company's first employees was Doug Church, who was studying at the Massachusetts Institute of Technology (MIT). The team was thus composed of Doug Church as programmer, Doug Wike as lead artist and Paul Neurath as lead designer. Development began in May 1990.

An early difficulty was the implementation of texture mapping. Neurath had experimented unsuccessfully with the concept on an Apple II computer in the late 1980s, but he believed that the more powerful IBM PCs of the time might be able to process it. He contacted Lerner Research programmer Chris Green—an acquaintance from his past work with Ned Lerner—who created a working algorithm. Using the Space Rogue engine, Green's algorithm, assembly code from Lerner Research's Car and Driver and original programming, the Blue Sky team completed a prototype of Underworld after roughly a month of work. Neurath described the prototype as "fast, smooth, and [featuring] true texture mapped walls, though the ceiling and floor were flat shaded and the corridors and rooms were all 10' [3.0 m] high—it looked a lot like Wolfenstein-3D in fact." The team demonstrated it at the June 1990 Consumer Electronics Show (CES) and impressed Origin Systems. Origin producer Warren Spector later said, "I remember Paul showing me that demo ... at CES and being totally floored by it. None of us had ever seen anything like it." The two companies reached a publishing agreement that summer, and Origin suggested that the game be reworked to fit into the Ultima universe. The team agreed, and the game was renamed Ultima Underworld. While Spector had hoped to produce the game, he was not assigned to the role; and he later said that he "sort of watched [the other producer] jealously from the sidelines."

After the game was renamed, Doug Church recruited Dan Schmidt, a college friend who had just graduated from MIT, as a programmer. The team abandoned the Space Rogue engine and created a new one that could display a believable 3D world—one with varying heights and texture-mapped floors and ceilings. Church estimated that the first year of production was dedicated to creating the game's technological base. However, Neurath stated that the team spent "comparatively little" time on the game's technology, and that "most was spent working on game features, mechanics, and world building". Their ultimate goal was to create the "finest dungeon game, a game that was tangibly better than any of the long line of dungeon games that came before it." Each member of the small team assumed multiple roles; for example, the game's first two levels were designed by Paul Neurath, while the rest were built by artists, designers and programmers. According to Schmidt, Neurath contracted a writer to create the game's story and dialogue, but the relationship was a "mismatch"; and so the team decided to write the plot themselves. Alongside his programming work, Church co-wrote the game's story with Dan Schmidt, and he gradually took on project leader responsibilities. Writing duties for each level were given to the person who created that level; Schmidt's role was to edit the dialogue of each level to fit with that of the others. Schmidt also created the game's sound effects, which were synthesized—no recorded sounds were used—in a graphical sound editor. Neurath, who Church said was "very day to day at the beginning of the project", became more involved with the company's business and finances.

Church explained that the core of the project was its "dynamic creation". He noted that the team had "no set of rules ... or pre-written plan", but rather worked organically toward the general idea of creating a "dungeon simulation". Church believed that the game's Ultima series heritage was extremely helpful, as it gave the team an anchor for their experiments. According to Church, because the team was young and inexperienced, they were "improvising almost the whole time". He said that they would "just write something" that seemed interesting, but would then "get it half done, and we'd say, 'Eh? That's not working.'" He believed that this iterative method was useful overall, but that it entailed an abnormally large workload: it resulted in the creation of "four movement systems before we were done, several combat systems, and so forth". Certain failed experiments meant that the team created "[AI] code for many ideas which turned out to be largely irrelevant to the actual gameplay".

During the first year of the game's development, Church believed that Origin had little faith in the team's ability to complete the game. He later said, "They didn't pay any attention at all, frankly." While Origin CEO Richard Garriott helped the team in fitting the game into the Ultima franchise, Warren Spector later said that the company seemed "blasé" about Ultima Underworld "for the first several months after ORIGIN and Blue Sky signed the deal", despite his own belief that it was a "change-the-world project". Neurath opined that this was due to the team's status as outsiders, whose company was "some 1,500 miles distant" from their publisher. The team was advanced $30,000 to create the game, but its final cost was $400,000. The game was funded partly by Ned Lerner, and by Neurath's royalties from Space Rogue. Throughout the game's production, the studio was run on a tight budget.

Roughly a year into development, the team discovered that their second producer—the first having quit Origin near the beginning of development—had left the project. Neurath later said that "neither [producer] had much involvement" in the game, and that, following the second's departure, the team spent time without any producer at all. Rumors circulated that Origin planned to cancel the project. Following a proposal by the team around this time, Spector, who had previously worked with Neurath on Space Rogue, assumed the role of producer. Church later described this event as "a big win for everyone". Spector began to interact regularly with the team by phone and to visit the studio in person. Neurath later said, "Warren understood immediately what we were trying to accomplish with the game, and became our biggest champion within Origin. Had not Warren stepped in this role at that stage, I'm not sure Ultima Underworld would have ever seen the light of day." Church said that Spector helped the team polish the game and "make it real", and that Spector's past experience in the industry enabled him to keep the team focused on completing the game. He explained that Spector "had that ability to help me and the rest of the guys reset, from the big-picture view of someone who has done it before."

We had about eight of us in this 15x15 room, sitting in uncomfortable red deck chairs, faxing bug lists to Origin and back, blasting music and playing Monkey Island II about 30 minutes a day to avoid insanity.

— Doug Church

The final four months of the game's development constituted "crunch time". During this period, Neurath rented an extremely small basement office space in a Somerville, Massachusetts social services building: he sought to circumvent the long commute that several team members had been making from Massachusetts. Furniture consisted of inexpensive folding tables and "uncomfortable red deck chairs". Development took place during the winter, but the room was drafty and poorly heated. The team hired college friends such as Marc LeBlanc to bug test the game, and Spector stayed at the studio for roughly a month and a half, according to Church. Spector later said that "in that little office, that team created some serious magic. I mean, the sense of doing something incredible was palpable". Neurath summarized, "Despite the austere working environment, the game came together amazingly well in the final stretch, and we delivered the Gold Master just about two years after we had started." The game was released in March 1992.

=== Technology ===
Ultima Underworld's game engine was written by a small team. Chris Green provided the game's texture mapping algorithm, which was applied to walls, floors and ceilings. The engine allowed for transparencies, walls at 45 degree angles, multiple tile heights and inclined surfaces, doors that swung open and closed, and other aspects. Ultima Underworld was the first video game to implement many of these effects. The game was also the first indoor, real-time, 3D first-person game to not only allow the player to look up and down, but also tilt the view side to side (for example, while swimming), as well as the ability to jump.

Ultima Underworld uses two-dimensional sprites for characters, but also features 3D objects, as the team believed that it "had to do 3D objects in order to have reasonable visuals". The game uses physics to calculate the motion of thrown objects. During the game's alpha testing phase, part of the programming team worked to create a smooth lighting model. The game's advanced technology caused the engine to run slowly, and its system requirements were extremely high. Doug Church later downplayed the importance of the game's technology, stating that technological advancement "is somewhat inevitable in our field ... [and] sadly, as an industry we seem to know much less about design, and how to continue to extend and grow design capabilities". Instead, he claimed that Ultima Underworld's most important achievement was its incorporation of simulation elements into a role-playing game.

== Reception ==
Reception

Review scores
Publication	Score
AllGame	4/5
Dragon	6 out of 5
ACE	938 out of 1000
Datormagazin	5/5
Mega Zone	87%
Power Play (DE)	94%
Play Time	95%
Pelit	98%
Svenska Hemdatornytt	66%

Awards
Publication	Award
Chicago Tribune	Best Game of the Year
Origins Award	Best Fantasy or Science Fiction Computer Game of 1992

Ultima Underworld was not an immediate commercial success, which caused Origin to decrease its marketing support. However, its popularity increased via word of mouth in the years following its release. Sales eventually reached nearly 500,000 copies, with praise for its 3D presentation and automapping feature. In 1993 the game won the Origins Award for Best Fantasy or Science Fiction Computer Game of 1992, and was nominated for an award at the Game Developers Conference.

ACE called Ultima Underworld "the next true evolutionary step in the RPG genre", and noted that its simulation-style dungeon was "frighteningly realistic". The magazine thought that the game's sprite character models "detract from the dense atmosphere a bit", but ended the review by stating, "If you've got a PC, then you've got to have Ultima Underworld." Dragon Magazine opined that "to say this is the best dungeon game we've ever played is quite an understatement," and it "will leave you wondering how other game entertainments can ever stack up against the new standards Abyss sets."

Computer Gaming World's Allen Greenberg in 1992 described it as "an ambitious project" but "not without its share of problems." He praised the game's "enjoyable story and well-crafted puzzles", but disliked its "robotic" controls and "confusing" perspectives, and stated that "far more impressive sounds and pictures have been produced for other dungeon games". He summarized the game as "an enjoyable challenge with a unique game-playing engine to back it up." Scorpia was also positive, stating that despite flaws "Ultima Underworld is an impressive first product. The meticulous construction of a real-world dungeon environment is outstanding. [It] may be a dungeon trek, but it is certainly the dungeon trek of the future". In 1993 she praised the "superb graphics" of "a definite must for game players". The magazine later awarded the game "Role-Playing Game of the Year". Computer Shopper enjoyed its storyline and characters, and believed that the game "makes you feel as if you've entered a virtual reality". Despite describing its interface as "not truly intuitive", the reviewer finished by calling the game "addictive" and "a fine value". The Chicago Tribune awarded it Best Game of the Year, and called it "an amazing triumph of the imagination" and "the creme de la creme of dungeon epics".

Jim Trunzo reviewed Ultima Underworld: The Stygian Abyss in White Wolf #32 (July/Aug., 1992), rating it a 5 out of 5 and stated that "Ultima Underworld is simply the kind of product that you need to experience to fully understand where Origin has taken fantasy gaming."

The game was also well received by non-English publications. The Swedish Datormagazin considered the game to be "in a class by itself". In Germany, Power Play praised its "technical perfection" and "excellent" story, while Play Time lauded its graphical and aural presentation, and awarded it Game of the Month. Finland's Pelit stated, "Ultima Underworld is something totally new in the CRPG field. The Virtual Fantasy of the Abyss left reviewers speechless."

Ultima Underworld was inducted into many hall of fame lists, including those compiled by GameSpy, IGN and Computer Gaming World. PC Gamer US ranked the game and its sequel 20th on their 50 Best Games Ever list from 1997, citing "strong character interaction, thoughtful puzzles, unprecedented control, and genuine roleplaying in ways that have yet to be duplicated". In 2004, readers of Retro Gamer voted Ultima Underworld as the 62nd top retro game: the staff called it "easily one of the best entries in the long-running Ultima series."

In 1998, PC Gamer declared it the 18th-best computer game ever released, and the editors called it "Light-years ahead of their time, and still regarded as some of the best roleplaying games ever created". A poll conducted in May 2023 by GQ among a team of video game journalists listed it as the 95th-best video game of all time.

== Legacy ==
Ultima Underworld has been cited as the first RPG to feature first-person action in a 3D environment, and even as the first true first-person 3D game in any genre. Rival 3D games appeared; Legends of Valour advertised "Ultima Underworld, move over!" Gamasutra posited that "all 3D RPG titles from Morrowind to World of Warcraft share Ultima Underworld as a common ancestor, both graphically and spiritually ... [and] for better or for worse, Underworld moved the text-based RPG out of the realm of imagination and into the third dimension". Its soundtrack, composed by George "The Fat Man" Sanger and Dave Govett, was the first in a major first-person game to use a dynamic music system; the player's actions alter the game's music.

Ultima Underworld is considered the first example of an immersive sim, a genre that combines elements from other genres to create a game with strong player agency and emergent gameplay, and has influenced many games since its release. The game's influence has been found in BioShock (2007), and that game's designer, Ken Levine, has stated that "all the things that I wanted to do and all the games that I ended up working on came out of the inspiration I took from [Ultima Underworld]." Gears of War designer Cliff Bleszinski also cited it as an early influence, stating that it had "far more impact on me than Doom". Other games influenced by Ultima Underworld include The Elder Scrolls: Arena, Deus Ex, Deus Ex: Invisible War, Vampire: The Masquerade – Bloodlines, Half-Life, and Half-Life 2. Toby Gard stated that, when designing Tomb Raider, he "was a big fan of ... Ultima Underworld and I wanted to mix that type of game with the sort of polygon characters that were just being showcased in Virtua Fighter." Ultima Underworld was also the basis for Looking Glass Technologies' later System Shock.

Id Software's use of texture mapping in Catacomb 3-D, a precursor to Wolfenstein 3D, was influenced by Ultima Underworld. Conflicting accounts exist regarding the extent of this influence, however. In the book Masters of Doom, author David Kushner asserts that the concept was discussed only briefly during a 1991 telephone conversation between Paul Neurath and John Romero. However, Doug Church has said that John Carmack saw the game's summer 1990 software convention demo, and recalled a comment from Carmack that he could write a faster texture mapper. Paul Neurath has recounted the incident similarly, with both Carmack and Romero present.

Despite the technology developed for Ultima Underworld, Origin opted to continue using traditional top-down, 2D graphics for future mainline Ultima games. The engine was re-used and enhanced for Ultima Underworld's 1993 sequel, Ultima Underworld II: Labyrinth of Worlds. Looking Glass Studios planned to create a third Ultima Underworld, but Origin rejected their pitches. After Electronic Arts (EA) rejected Arkane Studios' pitch for Ultima Underworld III, the studio instead created a spiritual successor: Arx Fatalis.

On March 14, 1997, a 3D remake of the game (published by Electronic Arts Victor) was released exclusively in Japan for the PlayStation by Infinity Entertainment. All of the creatures and NPCs were recreated using polygon models; however, the items and environments use their original textures. The HUD and inventory were reworked to allow the game to be displayed in fullscreen. Additionally, the character were redrawn in an anime style to make them more appealing to the Japanese market. Sound effects were added and all of the music was remixed (with most of it slightly resembling the original music). New ending and introduction videos were also added.

In the early 2000s, Paul Neurath approached EA to discuss a port of Ultima Underworld to the Pocket PC. EA rejected the suggestion, but allowed him to look for possible developers; Neurath found that ZIO Interactive enthusiastically supported the idea, and EA eventually licensed the rights to the company. Doug Church and Floodgate Entertainment assisted with portions of its Pocket PC development, and the port was released in 2002.

GOG.com released an emulated version in June 2011 for Windows and in October 2012 for Mac OS X.

In 2015, Otherside Entertainment, a new developer founded by Paul Neurath and other Looking Glass and Irrational veterans, announced a new entry in the series, entitled Underworld Ascendant. The new title is an officially licensed part of the series set in the Stygian Abyss, but this licensing agreement does not extend to the Ultima name or greater IP, effectively orphaning Underworld from the Ultima series.
