= Ultima Underworld II: Labyrinth of Worlds =

1993 first-person role-playing video game

- Developer(s): LookingGlass Technologies
- Publisher(s): Origin Systems; Electronic Arts
- Director(s): Paul Neurath
- Producer(s): Warren Spector
- Designer(s): Paul Neurath; Doug Church; Tim Stellmach
- Programmer(s): Doug Church
- Writer(s): Austin Grossman
- Composer(s): Jon Blackley; Dan Schmidt
- Series: Ultima
- Platform(s): DOS, FM Towns, PC-98
- Release: DOS; NA: January 10, 1993; EU: 1993; FM Towns; JP: March 1995; PC-98; JP: March 17, 1995; Windows/macOS; WW: June 2, 2011
- Genre(s): Action role-playing
- Mode(s): Single-player

Ultima Underworld II: Labyrinth of Worlds is a 1993 action role-playing game developed by LookingGlass Technologies and published by Origin Systems. As the sequel to Ultima Underworld: The Stygian Abyss, the game is set in the Ultima fantasy universe. Players assume the role of the Avatar—the protagonist of the Ultima series—and adventure through multiple dimensions while seeking to prevent the evil Guardian from achieving world domination. Progression is largely nonlinear and the game allows for emergent gameplay.

Ultima Underworld II began production in April 1992, shortly after the completion of Ultima Underworld; and it was developed in nine months. The team sought to improve upon the foundation laid by the game's predecessor, particularly by increasing the size and interactivity of the game world. The team reused and improved the first game's engine. Development was impeded by insufficient staffing and extensive playtesting, and the rapid production cycle led to burnout on the team.

Most critics gave Ultima Underworld II positive reviews and lauded its graphics, design and nonlinearity. Complaints focused on its high system requirements and unrefined pacing. It has been placed on numerous hall of fame lists since its release. In reaction to the game's difficult development, Looking Glass altered its design approach: they streamlined ideas from the Ultima Underworld series to create System Shock. The team pitched a sequel to Ultima Underworld II multiple times, but Origin Systems rejected the idea. Arkane Studios' Arx Fatalis (2002) is a spiritual successor to the franchise originally pitched as a sequel. OtherSide Entertainment's Underworld Ascendant is the first officially licensed entry in the series in over 23 years.

== Gameplay ==
Ultima Underworld II is a role-playing video game that takes place from a character's eye view in a three-dimensional (3D) graphical environment. The player's goal is to adventure through dungeon-like indoor environments across eight parallel dimensions, while completing quests to help the inhabitants of each world. The player uses a freely movable mouse cursor to interact with the game's world and to manipulate the heads-up display (HUD) interface. Icons on the HUD allow the player to examine objects closely, to converse with non-player characters (NPCs) and to ready the player character's weapon, among other things. During the game, the player collects items and stores them in an inventory on the HUD. Because it uses the same engine as its predecessor, Ultima Underworld II shares many of that game's features. For example, it allows the player character to jump and swim, and it contains an automap.

The player character stands in Killorn Keep with his weapon raised. The HUD icons are in the bottom right corner, and the player's inventory takes up the right side of the screen.

The player begins by creating a character, for whom traits such as gender, character class and skills may be selected. Skills range from diplomacy and lockpicking to blacksmithing. The game starts in the castle of Lord British, through which the player accesses other dimensions. The player character gains experience points by fighting, completing quests and exploring. During combat, the player attacks by clicking the screen: more damage is dealt when the player presses and holds the attack button. Depending on where the player clicks, different types of attacks—such as thrusts and slashes—occur. The player may cast spells by using an appropriate combination of "runestones", which are collected throughout the game. When enough experience points have been accumulated, the player character levels up and gains hit points. Experience points also grant "skill points", which allow the character to increase skill proficiency. Unlike in Ultima Underworld: The Stygian Abyss, skills are not improved at shrines; rather, they are increased by training with NPCs at the castle or in other dimensions.

As with its predecessor, Ultima Underworld II was designed to generate emergent gameplay through the interplay of simulated systems. The developers attempted to combine role-playing elements with "a sophisticated three-dimensional simulation of a sensible and believable world". For example, torches burn out, items wear over time and the player character must eat. Many items in the game are useless but were included for the sake of realism. The game is nonlinear, in that players must "visit and revisit" areas as the character gains abilities and becomes stronger, instead of "clearing each square foot as they go". Many situations and puzzles in the game have multiple solutions.

== Plot ==
=== Setting and characters ===
Ultima Underworld II is set in the fantasy world of the Ultima franchise. It takes place across multiple parallel dimensions, the first being Britannia, the traditional setting of Ultima games. The protagonist is the Avatar, the main character of the series. Chronologically, the events of the game occur directly after those of Ultima VII: The Black Gate, rather than those of the original Ultima Underworld. As with Ultima VII, the villain of Ultima Underworld II is the Guardian, an evil being who seeks to conquer Britannia. The game features recurring characters from previous Ultima games, such as Lord British, Nystul, Dupre, Iolo and Mayor Patterson. Also present are Lady Tory and Miranda, the latter of whom appeared in Ultima VII.

=== Story ===
One year after the events of Ultima VII: The Black Gate, the Avatar and many other recurring characters from the Ultima series attend a celebration at the castle of Lord British. However, they are trapped when a large dome of impenetrable "blackrock" covers the castle. The Guardian plans to attack Britannia while the characters are trapped, and he explains that those who do not surrender will be left to die in the dome. Searching the sewers beneath the castle, the Avatar locates a smaller blackrock crystal that leads to alternate dimensions. The magic used by the Guardian to seal the castle caused interdimensional portals to open between eight parallel worlds, each of which is a "center" for the Guardian's power across dimensions. The denizens of these dimensions are ruled by the Guardian, and the player must free each world to weaken the Guardian's power over Lord British's castle and elsewhere. The Guardian mocks the efforts of the Avatar in their dreams throughout the game. As the Avatar explores other worlds, a contemporaneous plotline, which PC Zone's David McCandless called a "soap opera", unfolds at the castle. One of those trapped in the castle is a traitor, and the Avatar must discover their identity.

The first dimension visited by the Avatar is a prison tower in "Fyrna", which has been conquered by goblins led by the Guardian. There, the player rescues a human resistance leader named Bishop, who then returns to lead a rebellion against the Guardian. Back at the castle, the player gives a small blackrock gem obtained in the prison tower to Nystul, who enchants it to disrupt the portal in the sewers. Next, the player visits Killorn Keep, a floating fortress in a different dimension. Altara, a sorceress in Killorn Keep who is allied with Bishop, warns the Avatar that the Guardian has hidden a magical spy beneath the castle in Britannia. She provides a special dagger with which to kill it. After removing the spy, the Avatar visits a dimension of ice caves: the remnants of a civilization destroyed by the Guardian, now ruled by a ghost named Beatrice. The Avatar returns to the castle and finds that Lady Tory has been murdered by the traitor. The next dimension is Talorus, a world inhabited by energy beings called "Talorids" that each serve a single purpose, such as knowing only the past or producing runestones. Talorids are created to serve the Guardian, but the Avatar destroys and replaces the sole reproductive Talorid to free the race.

The Avatar completes a series of tests at Scintillus Academy, a mage school whose staff was killed by the Guardian. Afterwards, the player travels to the Pits of Carnage, a subterranean prison on a world where the Guardian trains soldiers to attack other dimensions; and to the Tomb of Praecor Loth, where a king killed in a war with the Guardian is buried. Finally, the Avatar visits the Ethereal Void, a strange world with floating, glowing pathways and no map. Eventually, the Avatar discovers that Mayor Patterson is the traitor and destroys the blackrock dome.

== Development ==
Looking Glass Technologies began to develop Ultima Underworld II in April 1992. The team's goal was to build upon the foundation laid by the game's predecessor, Ultima Underworld: The Stygian Abyss. They attempted to write a better, more complex plot and to include superior simulation elements and "play value". According to project leader Doug Church, the team's "biggest advantage" was the presence of four dedicated designers; by contrast, each member of the original game's team had assumed multiple roles. The Tomb of Praecor Loth was largely created by lead writer Austin Grossman, who took inspiration from the Dungeons & Dragons module Tomb of Horrors. The additional designers allowed Looking Glass to more carefully revise levels in Ultima Underworld II, so that players would have "interesting stuff" to see and do each time they explored an area. The team attempted to fine-tune the role-playing mechanics of Ultima Underworld, such as by making certain skills more powerful in the sequel. More puzzles and interactivity were added, and the game world was made several times larger than that of Ultima Underworld, according to Church. He later believed that the team was overambitious, and that the game was insufficiently focused and polished as a result.

Like its predecessor, Ultima Underworld II was produced by Warren Spector, who was Looking Glass' main link to publisher Origin Systems. Church later praised Spector's handling of the project: his weekly phone conversations and monthly meetings with Looking Glass helped Church and the team to refocus creatively during development. When the team failed to produce enough art for the game, Spector supplemented the art team with contractors from Origin, which Church believed was "critical" to the game's being released on schedule. As a result of the art team's distance from Looking Glass, Church had to phone "nine different area codes every couple days to check up on things". He recalled the challenge of describing the enemy designs by phone. Dan Schmidt and the recently hired Seamus Blackley composed the game's score in Blackley's apartment over one week. They attempted to give each world a unique sound, while hiding variations of the main theme in each track. The music system from the original Ultima Underworld was retained with only minor alterations, but the team included digitized sound effects instead of the synthesized audio used in the first game.

Ultima Underworld II was developed in nine months. It was originally slated for a February 1993 release, but the date was later moved up to December 1992. The game underwent two and a half months of playtesting by Origin and Looking Glass employees, and by remote testing firms. According to Church, the testing phase took more time than expected because of complaints from playtesters and the presence of numerous bugs. Church went to Origin's headquarters in Texas during the final stages of development. The team "tried desperately to make Christmas", and the game was completed around December 18. Church compiled the final version on his laptop in Spector's office. However, the game was held back for further playtesting even though it could have shipped on schedule. Church later commented, "[T]here was one bug we couldn't reproduce, and everyone really wanted to go home for Christmas. We ended up taking a few days off, checking it a few more days and using that version anyway." The delay caused the game to miss the holiday season. It was shipped in January 1993.

=== Technology ===
Ultima Underworld II was built with an improved version of the game engine used for its predecessor. The team enhanced its visual capabilities: they broadened the first-person view by 30%, expanded the color palette, added more 3D objects, increased the size and animation of character sprites and wrote a new texture mapping algorithm. Director Paul Neurath commented that Ultima Underworld's texture mapping had failed to "look quite as good as we had hoped", and that the new system realized their vision. The game's code is roughly 30% larger than that of Ultima Underworld—bloat that Church attributed to "second project syndrome".

== Reception ==
Reception

Review scores
Publication	Score
PC Format	93%
PC Zone	94 out of 100
PC Review	9 out of 10

According to Paul Neurath, Ultima Underworld II and its predecessor together sold half a million units. Paul Presley of PC Review called the game "huge" and praised its atmosphere, increased variety and higher graphical detail. However, he found that the game, unlike its predecessor, does not feature "anything that takes it to a higher plateau to wait for the others to catch up". He summarized Ultima Underworld II as "magnificent", and he wrote, "If someone were to hand me £40 and say buy either Underworld I or II, I'd take the sequel any time." PC Zone's David McCandless wrote, "Nothing can completely prepare you for the freedom the game gives you ... It's about as close to Virtual Reality as you are ever likely to get from your mouse driver." He praised the game's atmospheric sound and called its graphics "stunning": on a high-end computer, he found that "dungeons can move like a film". Partly because of the game's large size, he felt that Ultima Underworld II was looser and less involving than its predecessor, but he concluded that players would still "sit there, dribble slightly, and say 'blimey' every eight to ten minutes."

The Toronto Star's William Burrill called it "the best fantasy ... role-playing game in this (or any parallel) world." He praised its automap and noted its increased graphical fidelity. However, he found that the control system took time to learn, and he stated, "This is not a game you can master quickly or play in a night. It has its frustrations and its flaws, despite its brilliance of design". He summarized that "those who are patient will be richly rewarded with a game like no other." Computer Gaming World's Doug Sencat enjoyed the game's graphics and praised the plot, conversations and 3D world for giving a sense of "being there". However, he noted that the game's movement controls were "a pain" and that navigating the environment was initially "frustrating". Sencat was unfavorable toward the linearity of the plot and dialogue trees, and toward NPCs' inability to take actions independent of the player. He described the game as "a long and grueling quest" that often "seems more frustrating than enjoyable". Although Semcat called it "a relatively high-quality game", he finished, "By the time I finally saw daylight again, emerging from the Labyrinth, I must admit that it wasn't exultation I felt, but sheer relief." The magazine's Scorpia was more positive, calling the game "a good follow-up to the previous entry".

Jim Trunzo reviewed Ultima Underworld II: Labyrinth of Worlds in White Wolf #36 (1993), rating it a 5 out of 5 and stated that "Ultima Underworld II is a true gaming experience. If you haven't tried this type of adventure, you can rest assured that it is well worth the money. Take a break from group adventures seen from an overhead perspective. Get a new outlook on fantasy gaming and check out the view in Ultima II."

=== Legacy ===
In a 2004 retrospective review, PC Gamer UK's John Walker stated that Ultima Underworld II "was new and exciting in half a dozen areas at once, not just one. Somehow, no game has quite achieved that since". PC Gamer has included Ultima Underworld II in several lists of the best computer games of all time: the game placed 5th in 1994, 18th in 1998, 54th in 2001, 39th in 2007, and 98th in 2011. One writer for the magazine wrote, "Like Ultima Underworld but again and better. No, that won't do. Ultima Underworld [II] needs to be hailed from the roof-tops for being one of the best dungeon-based adventure RPGs of all illustrious gaming history." Another wrote that "[n]o other game since has raised the bar half as high". In 2011, a writer for PC Gamer called Ultima Underworld II "a game from the future" that was "[w]onderfully, richly, impossibly interactive".

According to Church, Looking Glass found Ultima Underworld II's long playtesting phase extremely stressful. Neurath commented that the game's rushed production led to burnout on the team. Near the end of development, the company decided that it "had done too many dungeon games", and it began to consider a project with a similar design philosophy but without a fantasy setting. After brainstorming sessions by Church, Spector, Grossman and Neurath, Looking Glass began development of System Shock. Grossman later stated that his work on the Tomb of Praecor Loth was in some ways a "mini-prototype" for ideas he fleshed out in System Shock. Looking Glass pitched a sequel to Ultima Underworld II several times, but Origin Systems rejected the idea. Years later, Arkane Studios pitched Ultima Underworld III to Electronic Arts and received a similar response, which inspired the studio to create the spiritual successor Arx Fatalis. In 2014, Neurath and his company OtherSide Entertainment announced Underworld Ascension, another spiritual successor to the Ultima Underworld series. In 2015 the game was renamed to Underworld Ascendant and a Kickstarter campaign was launched and successfully funded.
