= Toon Strikes Again =

Cartoon tabletop role-playing game supplement

- Cover by Kyle Miller
- Designers: Warren Spector
- Publishers: Steve Jackson Games
- Publication: 1985; 40 years ago
- Genres: Comedy
- Systems: Custom

Toon Strikes Again is a 1985 comedy tabletop role-playing game adventure for Toon, written by Warren Spector, published by Steve Jackson Games.

== Contents ==
Toon Strikes Again contains four adventures, advice for the gamemaster, and two pages in the back of the book presenting sample characters.

== Reception ==
Stephen Kyle reviewed Toon Strikes Again for White Dwarf #69, giving it an overall rating of 8 out of 10, and stated that "All in all, if you already play Toon, and enjoy it, you probably don't need this supplement; but if you'd like to play Toon, but can't figure out where to start, then this could be just what you are looking for."

Matt Williams reviewed Toon Strikes Again for Imagine magazine, and stated that "All this adds up to a feast of fun for Toon players, delightfully illustrated in addition. I'm not going to mince words here. Steve Jackson Games have cooked up a tasty side-dish for Toon, the game that gives a carte-oon blanche to the imagination."

Russell Grant Collins reviewed Toon Strikes Again in Space Gamer No. 76. Collins commented that "these adventures are full of events that should follow one after another as the characters move sequentially through them, but that hardly ever happens in Toon adventures. Far better if they had simply set up a situation and let the characters run loose in it, because that's what they're going to do anyway."

== Reviews ==
- Casus Belli #30 (Jan 1986)
