= Son of Toon =

Son of Toon is a 1986 role-playing game supplement published by Steve Jackson Games for Toon.

== Contents ==
Son of Toon is a supplement in which new shticks, gizmos, and campaign rules for the "Cartoon Series" are featured, along with three new adventure scenarios.

== Publication history ==
Son of Toon was written by Allen Varney, Warren Spector, and Kyle Miller and published by Steve Jackson Games in 1986 as a 40-page book.

Shannon Appelcline noted that "As with Paranoia the biggest problem with Toon was that it did not really encourage long-term campaign play. The third Toon supplement, Son of Toon (1986) tried to address this by introducing the 'cartoon series', a concept described by author and staffer Allen Varney. These series remained true to cartoon logic, containing no actual continuity, just consistent characters, running gags and recurring bad guys. Son of Toon was the final supplement for the game until an early 1990s revival."
