= Toon (role-playing game) =

1984 Cartoon tabletop role-playing game

The Cartoon Roleplaying Game
- Cover by Kyle Miller
- Designers: Greg Costikyan; Warren Spector
- Publishers: Steve Jackson Games
- Publication: 1984
- Genres: Comedy
- Systems: Custom

Toon is a comedy tabletop role-playing game in which the players take the roles of cartoon characters. It is subtitled The Cartoon Roleplaying Game. Toon was designed by Greg Costikyan and developed by Warren Spector, and first published in 1984 by Steve Jackson Games. In December 2025, development of a second edition was announced.

== Development ==
Jeff Dee came up with the idea of creating a role-playing game based on cartoons when he and Greg Costikyan were talking with several other designers about genres that no one had designed game systems for; although they agreed that such a game would be impossible to design, Costikyan designed Toon a few years later as a full game with the assistance of Warren Spector.

In December 2025, Steve Jackson Games announced that a second edition of Toon is in development, with a BackerKit launched in December 2025 stating a plan to release by December 2026.

== Style ==
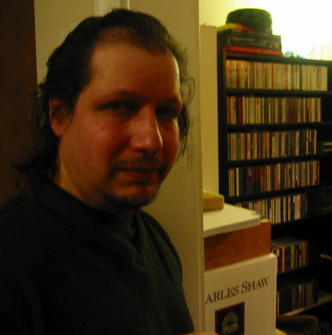
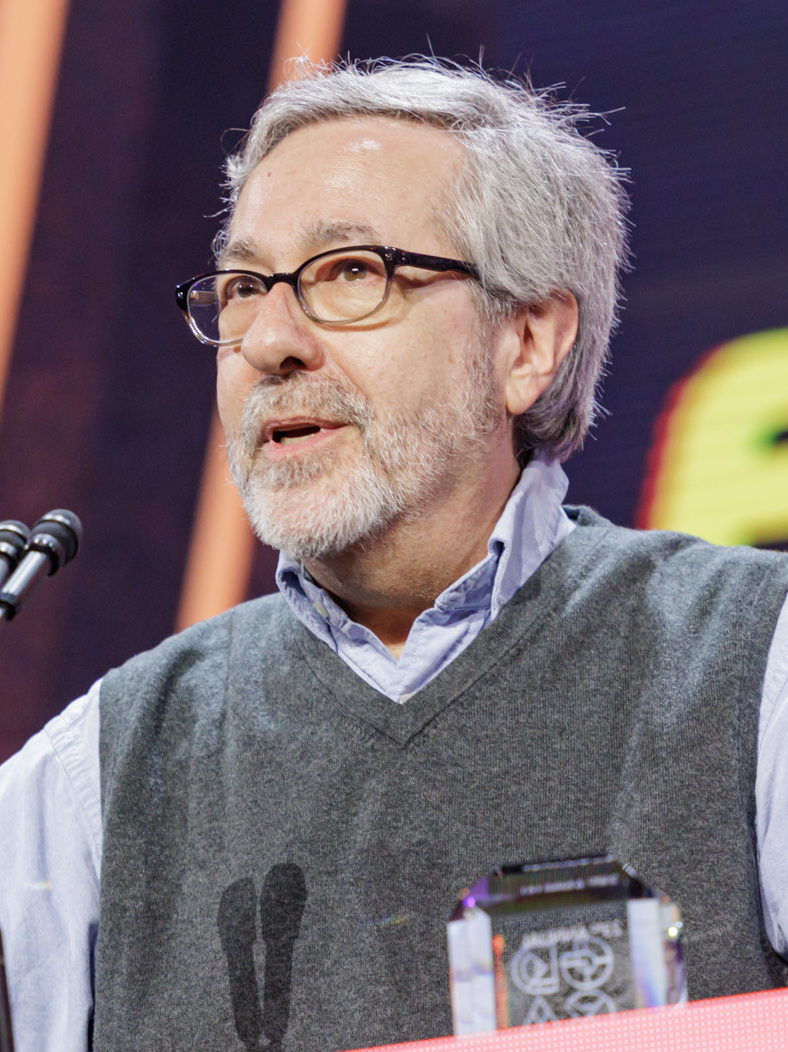
Greg Costikyan designed Toon with help from Warren Spector.

Although Toon is a genuine role-playing game requiring the participation of players and a game master (called the "Animator"), it is designed with a tongue-in-cheek style that deliberately parodies many of the conventions of more standard, "serious" role-playing games.

In Toon the player characters never die. As in many role-playing games, characters have hit points, which are deducted when the character is injured (usually in combat, or by having anvils fall on them). When characters are reduced to zero hit points they do not die or fall unconscious, but fall down. Since cartoon characters never actually die, and always return in time for the next scene, a fallen down character returns to play a set time later, with all hit points restored.

This lack of true "character death" is also designed to encourage players to deliberately abandon the skills and reflexes they learned in other games, namely to have their characters able to solve problems and fight enemies while staying alive. According to the game's rules, the two prime directives for Toon players to follow are "Forget Everything You Know" and "Act Before You Think".

The game encourages players to have fun above all other considerations – even to the point of breaking the rules of the game. If the players and the Animator agree that a players' actions in a game are funny and enjoyable, then that players' actions are allowed and encouraged. This can be seen as a way for players to "break the fourth wall" in the game, in the same way that animated cartoons often ignore reality for the sake of laughs.

The game uses a very simple skill-based task resolution system based on a list of only 23 skills that cover all possible character actions. These are assigned to four controlling attributes, humorously named "Muscle" (strength), "Zip" (dexterity and speed), "Smarts" (intelligence) and "Chutzpah" (pushiness and self-confidence). In addition, characters can have optional "Shticks", which give them unusual cartoon-like abilities, such as flying or invisibility.

The game was inspired by the classic Warner Bros. cartoons of the 1930s through the 1960s, and characters such as Bugs Bunny and Daffy Duck, but Steve Jackson Games is careful to avoid any copyright violations. For example, there is an "Ace Corporation" in Toon products (instead of the Acme Corporation), and the writers' guidelines for Toon prohibit the use of the word "toon" to mean "a cartoon character".

== Toon books ==
- Toon: The Cartoon Roleplaying Game. Spector, Warren; Costikyan, Greg (1984). Toon: The Cartoon Roleplaying Game. Austin TX, USA: Steve Jackson Games. ISBN 978-1556341977.
- Toon Silly Stuff (1985)
- Son of Toon (1985)
- Toon Strikes Again. Spector, Warren (1985). Toon Strikes Again. Austin TX, USA: Steve Jackson Games. ISBN 88-86149-04-2.
- Toon: The Cartoon Roleplaying Game (Deluxe Edition) (1991). Incorporates all material from the original edition, plus Toon Silly Stuff, Son of Toon, and Toon Strikes Again.
- Tooniversal Tour Guide (1992)
- Toon Tales (1993)
- Toon Ace Catalog (1994)
- Toon Munchkin (2006)

== Reception ==
In the December 1984 edition of Dragon (Issue #92), Michael Dobson commented that the game "appears at first glance to be an elaborate joke." But then he went on to say that "Toon is a genuinely good idea – an original (if unlikely) concept in role-playing – that is enjoyable, fast-moving, and incredibly silly." Dobson liked the simplicity of the rules system, and concluded with a strong recommendation, saying, "Inspired silliness – the very heart of this game."

In the December 1984 edition of Imagine (Issue #21), Mike Lewis liked the game, stating, "Toon is a very refreshing change from the usual run-of-the-mill rpgs which have been appearing recently. The game very firmly puts a sense of humour back into rpgs. If you are interested in cartoons, then Toon is an essential purchase – but even if you aren't, try it for a change. I am very impressed with the ideas behind this game and hope that it gets more support than most minority RPGs have done in the past. It deserves it."

In the January–February 1985 edition of Space Gamer (No. 72), R.A. Greer gave a positive review, commenting, "Toon is a quick cure for all your roleplaying ills, a fast-acting balm to be applied directly to your funny bone, speeding you back to those uncomplicated days of roleplaying when it was fun!"

In the January–February 1985 edition of Different Worlds (Issue #38), Larry DiTillio found much to like and gave the game a solid three stars out of four. He called the character generation rules "dirt simple", and found that resolving skills "is even easier than generating characters." He also admired the writing style, saying "[Greg] Costikyan has clarity, wit, and the good sense to be brief, as well as an obvious love for cartoons. The rulebook not only reads quickly and easily, it makes you eager to play the game." DiTillio concluded "for a few hours of silliness, Toon can't be beat and is a refreshing change from the ofttimes leaden pace of other role-playing games. It's fast, it's fun, it's simple."

In the March 1985 edition of White Dwarf (Issue #63), Stephen Kyle gave the game an excellent overall rating of 9 out of 10, stating that "all of us have favourite cartoons or characters and Toon enables you to recreate them easily and with a lot of fun."

In the April 1989 edition of Dragon (Issue #144), Jim Bambra took a retrospective look at the then five-year old game, and called it "a classic – a game which deserves the attention of everyone looking for a dramatic change of pace and emphasis in their role-playing." Bambra complimented the easy rules and flexible system, and concluded, "I highly recommend it as an evening’s entertainment and as a cure to role-playing blues. Buy a copy if you are in a silly mood or need to be cheered up."

In his 1990 book The Complete Guide to Role-Playing Games, game critic Rick Swan commented "If not the funniest RPG ... Toon is certainly the oddest ... It's a world of utter anarchy." Swan admired the creative list of skills and the Fifty Percent rule used by referees in ambiguous situations. However, Swan warned "Any game as freeform as Toon depends heavily on the improvisational skills of the referee, which is the game's major drawback." Despite this, Swan concluded by giving the game an excellent rating of 3.5 out of 4, saying, "In the hands of a witty referee and a group of receptive players, Toon can be hilarious, an excellent introductory game for novices, and a delightful change of pace for veterans."

In his 2023 book Monsters, Aliens, and Holes in the Ground, RPG historian Stu Horvath noted, "While other games had been funny before now, Toon was the first game entirely focused on comedy. More importantly, it was the first in a wave of rules-light games that flew in the face of the accepted design doctrine that RPGs needed complex rules systems to be fun or satisfying."

== Reviews ==
- Shadis #28 (1996)
- Casus Belli #23 (Dec 1984)
- Dragão Brasil (Issue 4 – Jul 1995) (Portuguese)
- Comics Feature #49

== See also ==
- Cartoon
- Cartoon physics
