= Shadows of Doubt =

2024 detective video game

- Developer: ColePowered Games
- Publisher: Fireshine Games
- Engine: Unity
- Platforms: Windows, Xbox Series S/X, PlayStation 5
- Release: Early access 24 April 2023 (Windows); Full game 26 September 2024
- Genre: Immersive sim
- Mode: Single-player

Shadows of Doubt is a 2024 first-person detective stealth video game developed by British developer ColePowered Games and published by Fireshine Games. It was released in early access on 24 April 2023 for Microsoft Windows. Upon release, Shadows of Doubt received generally favorable views, with critics praising the innovative design of the game's open-ended gameplay, whilst critiquing its repetitive elements and bugs. The game left early access on 26 September 2024, coinciding with a digital release on Xbox Series S/X and PlayStation 5, with a physical release planned in future for console versions of the game.

== Gameplay ==
Shadows of Doubt is an open world detective investigation game played from a first-person perspective. The player works as a private investigator who pursues murder cases in a city. The city's layout, its citizens and their routines, and all murder cases are procedurally-generated per save file, and the player can choose the city's name, size, and seed. The player has access to police transmissions and is alerted whenever a murder is reported, allowing them to open a case. The details of each murder case are randomly configured: murders may occur anywhere and at any time, any citizen can be involved, the crime can be carried out through a variety of lethal methods, and the available forensic evidence can include fingerprints, surveillance camera footage, witness observations, and more. The player also has to contend with false leads, time-sensitive evidence, anti-intrusion security measures ranging from locked doors to automated turrets, and hostile responses from citizens who catch the player doing anything illegal.

The player can complete a murder case by submitting a case resolution form to the local city hall. The form has five fields: the suspect's full name, their address, a piece of evidence placing the suspect at the crime scene, the murder weapon, and whether the suspect has been placed under arrest. Only the murderer's name is required for a successful submission, but a cash bonus is rewarded for each optional field that is correctly filled out. If the player accuses the wrong citizen, they will be fined and the real murderer will continue killing. Sometime after a murder case is resolved, the game will automatically select another citizen to carry out the next string of killings, presenting the player with a fresh case.

The player's overarching goal is to increase their social credit score by solving murder cases. Reaching the maximum social credit score enables the player to leave their city and enter retirement, concluding the game. Meanwhile, money earned from murder cases and various odd jobs is needed to purchase certain investigation tools, rent and furnish an apartment, pay for medical care when injured, pay off fines, and bribe citizens for information or access to restricted areas.

== Plot ==
Shadows of Doubt takes place in an alternate history that diverges from the real world in the year 1610: Henry IV of France is not assassinated, allowing English inventor William Lee's knitting machine to spur an early industrial revolution in France. Consequently, the Jacobite rising of 1745 prevails in England and Charles Edward Stuart is crowned King Charles III, leading to lasting peace between the two countries and the subsequent formation of an Anglo-French Empire under Louis XVI, which in turn quells the American Revolution in 1776. The Empire is torn apart by rebellions during the Mustard War from 1891 to 1901, and then reorganized into the democratic United Atlantic States in 1902, which enshrines corporate personhood into law in order to rebuild its economy. In 1965, Starch Kola, the world's oldest megacorporation, is elected President of the UAS and replaces local police forces with the privatized Starch Kola Enforcers.

The current year is 1979, and the player is a citizen of the UAS. Due to hyper-industrialization, radioactive fallout from the Mustard War, and rising sea levels caused by global warming, most people live and work in cramped, smog-shrouded cities isolated by the toxic water. Every UAS citizen dreams of attaining the lofty social credit score necessary to retire to The Fields, an exclusive district purportedly located in one of the last unsullied regions. As a former police officer, the player has the skills and tools to take on freelance investigation work. Since the Enforcers are spread thin, willing citizens are permitted to investigate murders, catalog evidence, and arrest criminals in exchange for cash and social credit score promotions. The catch is that successfully solving a murder as a freelancer often involves bending or even breaking the law.

== Development ==
Shadows of Doubt was created by ColePowered Games, the development studio of lead developer Cole Jeffries. Jeffries began work on the game in 2018 as an isometric 2D business simulation where players manage a detective agency to solve crimes in a city with procedurally-generated citizens. This design was later changed to a first-person 3D with players assuming the role of an individual detective, with models for the game adapted from Jeffries' 2015 city-themed title Concrete Jungle into pixel art and voxels. Jeffries cited System Shock and Deus Ex as inspiration for the game's first-person object interaction system, and the noir genre, urban landscapes of John Atkinson Grimshaw and midcentury interiors of designers including Verner Panton as references for the visual approach of the game.

The COVID-19 pandemic disrupted the development schedule, although a rough playable demo was created for the canceled EGX Rezzed expo in 2020. Writer Stark Holborn was brought onto the project to flesh out the setting.

A closed alpha test of Shadows of Doubt involving 250 participants was held in mid-2021. This was followed by a public demo that was first made available during Steam NextFest in February 2023, after which ColePowered Games confirmed the game's early access release date.

== Release ==
Shadows of Doubt left early access on 26 September 2024, coinciding with a digital release on Xbox Series S/X and PlayStation 5, with a physical release planned in future for console versions of the game.

The game also receives future updates. On 18 September, 2025, Shadows of Doubt added new modifiers, including a mode "Film Noir" mode with a black and white filter, permadeath and Ironman modes and a mode where the detective plays as a rat. It also added a mode titled "Snail Nemesis", apparently inspired by the "Immortal Snail" meme by Gavin Free, in which the detective is otherwise immortal, but is stalked by a snail that kills them if it manages to catch them.

== Reception ==
=== Pre-release ===
Describing the early access version of Shadows of Doubt as "incredibly refreshing", Rachel Watts of Rock Paper Shotgun praised the game for its "thrilling" sleuthing and advantages over scripted detective games, commending the "hands-off" design of the game in spite of its "overwhelming" pacing and investigation failures. Zoey Handley of Destructoid found the game to have "amazing" potential, citing the game's "believable" and persistent world and "fun" casework, but noting the game's state was "pretty rough" and "can sometimes break in interesting ways and defy logic". Whilst praising the game's "fun" gameplay loop and "impressive" open-ended design, Liv Ngan of Eurogamer found Shadows of Doubt to be unengaging and the world to be "formulaic" due to its procedural setting, noting the game's repetitive elements, the lack of player behavior on the outcome of a case, and the inconsistent visual styles and cultures in the game's setting.

=== Post-release ===
Reception

Aggregate scores
| Aggregator | Score |
|---|---|
| Metacritic | (PC) 68/100 |
| OpenCritic | 67% recommend |

Review scores
| Publication | Score |
|---|---|
| GamesRadar+ | 3.5/5 |
| PC Gamer (US) | 83/100 |
| PCGamesN | 7/10 |
| CGMagazine | 4/10 |
| Sports Illustrated | 8/10 |

Shadows of Doubt received "mixed or average" reviews from critics, according to review aggregator Metacritic, and 67% of critics recommended the game, according to OpenCritic.

Reviewers generally praised the game's open-ended approach to detective gameplay, with several recounting their experiences in undertaking a complex chain of actions to complete cases. PCGamesN described Shadows of Doubt as one of the best detective games on PC, with Paul Kelly writing that the game's investigation mechanics offered "complete freedom" and felt rewarding. Brendan Caldwell of Rock Paper Shotgun considered the game's open-ended design lent itself to "interesting, funny, and unique-feeling" gameplay. Justin Wood of CGMagazine praised the investigative mechanics as a "standout feature" of the game due to the "organic and challenging" gameplay and "numerous paths for progression". Describing Shadows of Doubt as "one of the best mystery games ever made", Ryan Woodrow of Sports Illustrated praised the game as "truly unique" due to its "hands-off" gameplay, although stating that this approach could be "obtuse" and lead to "frustrating" dead ends.

Critics expressed mixed assessments of the game's use of procedural generation in its detective gameplay. Caldwell commended the game's "commitment to simulation" and described it as a "deeply complex and emergent game", although found the "slightly wonky" behavior of characters, repetitive dialogue and case design exposed some of the "limitations of the game's world". Kelly stated the game's "dense sandbox" delivered on creating a "living world" with "fully-realized inhabitants", but other aspects fell short, due to the "repetitive and bland" interactions and lack of consequences to investigation. Wolens expressed that many items and interactions were prone to repetition, and the generated qualities of city inhabitants lacked an organic and social element that made individuals unmemorable. Wood considered the game's narrative to be "engaging and vital", but noted the procedural design meant that cases lacked an "actual connective tissue" in creating a broader story.

Many reviewers critiqued the persistence of technical problems in the full release of Shadows of Doubt. Wolens encountered "a few technical and mechanical gripes", finding the game to be resource-intensive and the generation of larger cities to be unplayable. Kelly stated that unexpected and buggy behaviors from NPCs could "break the illusion" of the simulation. Wood critiqued the game's "issues and technical imperfections" on console, due to crashes, long load times, menu and cursor bugs, and errors with the behaviour of evidence that made completing cases impossible.
