= Franco-British Union =

Proposed political union of the two states

Map of the Franco-British Union as proposed in 1940.

The Franco-British Union (French: Union franco-britannique) was a proposed union in the 20th century to unite the United Kingdom and the French Republic during the Second World War. This hypothetical union would have united their militaries, government, and the foreign policy of both nations. Though declined in the end, the proposed union has been compared with some historical similarities in the past, as attempts to unite the two nations under different circumstances has occurred.

== Historical unions ==
=== England and France ===
Ties between France and England have been intimate since the Norman Conquest, in which William the Conqueror duke of Normandy, became king of England, while also owing feudal ties to the French crown.

From 1066 to 1214, the King of England held extensive fiefs in northern France, adding to Normandy the counties of Maine, Anjou, and Touraine, and the Duchy of Brittany. After 1154, the King of England was also duke of Aquitaine (or Guienne), together with Poitou, Gascony, and other southern French fiefs dependent upon Aquitaine. Together with the northern territories, this meant that the King of England controlled more than half of France – the so-called Angevin Empire – though still nominally as the king of France's vassal. The center of gravity of this composite realm was generally south of the English Channel; four of the first seven kings after the Norman Conquest were French-born, and all were native speakers of French. For centuries thereafter the royalty and nobility of England were educated in French as well as English. In certain respects, England became an outlying province of France; English law took the strong impress of local French law, and there was an influx of French words into the English language.

This anomalous situation came to an end with the Battle of Bouvines in 1214, when King Philip II of France deposed King John of England from his northern French fiefs; in the chaos that followed, the heir to the throne of France, later Louis VIII, was offered the throne of England by rebellious English barons from 1216 to 1217 and travelled there to take it. He was proclaimed king of England in St. Paul's Cathedral, where many nobles, including King Alexander II of Scotland, paid him homage. He captured Winchester and soon controlled over half the kingdom, but after the death of King John his support dwindled and he was forced to make peace, renouncing his claim to the throne. England was ultimately able to retain a reduced Guienne as a French fief, which was retained and enlarged when war between the two kingdoms resumed in 1337.

From 1340 to 1360, and from 1369 on, the king of England assumed the title of "king of France"; but although England was generally successful in its war with France, no attempt was made to make the title a reality during that period of time.

The situation changed with King Henry V of England's invasion of France in 1415. By 1420, England controlled northern France (including the capital) for the first time in 200 years. King Charles VI of France was forced to disinherit his own son, the Dauphin Charles, in favour of Henry V. As Henry predeceased the French king by a few months, his son Henry VI was proclaimed king of England and of France from 1422 by the English and their allies but the Dauphin retained control over parts of central and southern France and claimed the crown for himself. From 1429 the Dauphin's party, including Joan of Arc, counterattacked and succeeded in crowning him as king.

Fighting between England and France continued for more than twenty years after, but by 1453 the English were expelled from all of France except Calais, which was lost in 1558. England also briefly held the town of Dunkirk in 1658–1662. The kings of England and their successor kings of Great Britain, purely as a habitual expression and with no associated political claim, continued to use the title "king of France" until 1801; the heads of the House of Stuart, out of power since 1688, used the title until their extinction in 1807.

=== Scotland and France ===
Norman or French culture first gained a foothold in Scotland during the Davidian Revolution, when King David I introduced Continental-style reforms throughout all aspects of Scottish life: social, religious, economic and administrative. He also invited immigrant French and Anglo-French peoples to Scotland. This effectively created a Franco-Scottish aristocracy, with ties to the French aristocracy as well as many to the Franco-English aristocracy. From the Wars of Scottish Independence, as common enemies of England and its ruling House of Plantagenet, Scotland and France started to enjoy a close diplomatic relationship, the Auld Alliance, from 1295 to 1560. From the Late Middle Ages and into the Early Modern Period Scotland and its burghs also benefited from close economic and trading links with France in addition to its links to the Low Countries, Scandinavia and the Baltic.

The prospect of dynastic union came in the 15th and 16th centuries, when Margaret, eldest daughter of James I of Scotland, married the future Louis XI of France. James V of Scotland married two French brides in succession. His infant daughter, Mary I, succeeded him on his death in 1542. For many years thereafter the country was ruled under a regency led by her French mother, Mary of Guise, who succeeded in marrying her daughter to the future Francis II of France. The young couple were king and queen of France and Scotland from 1559 until Francis died in 1560. Mary returned to a Scotland heaving with political revolt and religious revolution, which made a continuation of the alliance impossible.

Cordial economic and cultural relations did continue however, although throughout the 17th century, the Scottish establishment became increasingly Presbyterian, often belligerent to Roman Catholicism, a facet which was somewhat at odds with Louis XIV's aggressively Catholic foreign and domestic policy. The relationship was further weakened by the Union of the Crowns in 1603, which meant from then on that although still independent, executive power in the Scottish government, the Crown, was shared with the Kingdom of England and Scottish foreign policy came into line more with that of England than with France.

== Modern concepts ==
=== Entente cordiale (1904) ===
In April 1904 the United Kingdom and the Third French Republic signed a series of agreements, known as the Entente Cordiale, which marked the end of centuries of intermittent conflict between the two powers, and the start of a period of peaceful co-existence. Although French historian Fernand Braudel (1902–1985) described England and France as a single unit, nationalist political leaders from both sides were uncomfortable with the idea of such a merger.

=== World War II (1940) ===
In December 1939, Jean Monnet of the French Economic Mission in London became the head of the Anglo-French Co-ordinating Committee, which coordinated a joint planning of the two countries' wartime economies. The Frenchman hoped for a postwar United States of Europe and saw an Anglo-French political union as a step toward his goal. He discussed the idea with Neville Chamberlain, Winston Churchill's assistant Desmond Morton, and other British officials.

In June 1940, French President of Council Paul Reynaud's government faced imminent defeat in the Battle of France. In March, the French and British had mutually agreed that neither country would seek a separate peace with Nazi Germany. The French cabinet on 15 June voted to ask Germany for the terms of an armistice. Reynaud, who wished to continue the war from North Africa, was forced to submit the proposal to Churchill's War Cabinet. He claimed that he would have to resign if the British were to reject the proposal.

The British opposed a French surrender, so Churchill, the then Prime Minister of the United Kingdom proposed a Franco-British union. However, by the time the proposal reached France, the French had already signed the armistice.

They hoped that such a union would help Reynaud persuade his cabinet to continue the war from North Africa, but Churchill was skeptical when the British War Cabinet discussed the proposal and a similar one from Secretary of State for India Leo Amery on 15 June. On the morning of 16 June, the War Cabinet agreed to the French armistice request on the condition that the French fleet sail to British harbors. This disappointed Reynaud, who had hoped to use a British rejection to persuade his cabinet to continue to fight.

Reynaud supporter Charles de Gaulle had arrived in London earlier that day, however, and Monnet told him about the proposed union. De Gaulle convinced Churchill that "some dramatic move was essential to give Reynaud the support which he needed to keep his government in the war". The Frenchman then called Reynaud and told him that the British prime minister proposed a union between their countries, an idea which Reynaud immediately supported. De Gaulle, Monnet, Vansittart, and Pleven quickly agreed to a document proclaiming a joint citizenship, foreign trade, currency, war cabinet, and military command. Churchill withdrew the armistice approval, and at 3 p.m. the War Cabinet met again to consider the union document. Despite the radical nature of the proposal, Churchill and the ministers recognized the need for a dramatic act to encourage the French and reinforce Reynaud's support within his cabinet before it met again at 5 pm.

The final "Declaration of Union" approved by the British War Cabinet on 16 June 1940 stated that;

France and Great Britain shall no longer be two nations, but one Franco-British Union. The constitution of the Union will provide for joint organs of defence, foreign, financial and economic policies. Every citizen of France will enjoy immediately citizenship of Great Britain, every British subject will become a citizen of France.

Churchill and de Gaulle called Reynaud to tell him about the document, and they arranged for a joint meeting of the two governments in Concarneau the next day. The declaration immediately succeeded in its goal of encouraging Reynaud, who saw the union as the only alternative to surrender and who could now cite the British rejection of the armistice.

Other French leaders were less enthusiastic, however. At the 5 p.m. cabinet meeting, many called it a last minute plan by the British to acquire control over the French colonial empire, and said that "be[ing] a Nazi province" was preferable to becoming a British dominion. Philippe Pétain, a leader of the pro-armistice group and later leader of the Nazi client state of Vichy France, called the union "fusion with a corpse". While President Albert Lebrun and some others were supportive, the cabinet's opposition stunned Reynaud. He resigned that evening without taking a formal vote on the union or an armistice, and later called the failure of the union the "greatest disappointment of my political career".

Reynaud had erred, however, by conflating opposition to the union – which a majority of the cabinet almost certainly opposed – with support for an armistice, which it almost certainly did not. If the proposal had been made a few days earlier, instead of the 16th when the French only had hours to decide between armistice and North Africa, Reynaud's cabinet might have considered it more carefully.

Pétain formed a new government that evening, which immediately decided to ask Germany for armistice terms. The British cancelled their plans to travel to Concarneau.

=== Suez Crisis (1956) ===
In September 1956, due to a common foe during the Suez Crisis, an Anglo-French Task Force was created. French Prime Minister Guy Mollet proposed a union between the United Kingdom and the French Union with Elizabeth II as head of state and a common citizenship. As an alternative, Mollet proposed that France join the Commonwealth. British Prime Minister Anthony Eden rejected both proposals; France went on to join the Treaty of Rome, which established the European Economic Community and strengthened Franco-German cooperation.

When the Mollet proposal was first made public in the United Kingdom on 15 January 2007 through an article by Mike Thomson published on the BBC News website, it received rather satirical treatment in the media of both countries, including the name, coined by the BBC, of Frangleterre (a portmanteau of "France" and "Angleterre", the French word for England). The UK broadcaster stated that Mollet's proposal originated from newly declassified material, arguing no such archive documents exist in France.

On 16 January 2007, during a television interview on LCP, French journalist Christine Clerc asked former French Interior Minister Charles Pasqua, a Gaullist, about Mollet's 1956 proposal. Pasqua answered,

"if his request had been made official, Mollet would have been brought to trial for high treason".

== In fiction ==
The Lord Darcy alternative history stories take place in a world where Richard I of England lived much longer and managed to unite England and France under his rule; by the 20th century, Anglo-French is a common language spoken by the inhabitants on both sides of the Channel, and there is no doubt surrounding them being a single people.

The Grandville graphic novels are set in an alternate history where France won the Napoleonic Wars and merged Britain into the First French Empire. Britain eventually regained independence through violent resistance and reformed as a socialist republic in the late 20th century, shortly before the setting of the novels.

In the video game Shadows of Doubt, the country in which the game takes place, the United Atlantic States, is in the ruins of the former Anglo-French empire. The empire was formed in the late 18th century and was ruled by the House of Bourbon.

== See also ==
- France–United Kingdom relations
- English claims to the French throne
- Gallic Empire
- Carausian Revolt
