= Underworld Ascendant =

2018 video game

- Developer: OtherSide Entertainment (Note: Additional work by Fullbright)
- Publisher: 505 Games
- Producer: Paul Neurath
- Designer: Tim Stellmach
- Artist: Nate Wells
- Series: Underworld
- Engine: Unity
- Platforms: Windows; PlayStation 4; Xbox One; Linux; macOS
- Release: Windows; November 15, 2018; PlayStation 4; June 20, 2019; Xbox One; June 26, 2019; Linux, macOS; August 19, 2019
- Genres: Action role-playing, dungeon crawler
- Mode: Single-player

Underworld Ascendant is a first-person action role-playing game developed by Otherside Entertainment and published by 505 Games. It is the sequel to Ultima Underworld: The Stygian Abyss and Ultima Underworld II: Labyrinth of Worlds. Players assume the role of the Avatar, as they return to the Stygian Abyss. As in the original Ultima games, there is an emphasis on non-linear progression, simulated systems, and emergent gameplay. It was released on Microsoft Windows on November 15, 2018.

== Gameplay ==
Players assume the role of the Avatar, a human magically transported into the Underworld. As per the original Underworld games, players create their characters by selecting an assortment of skills. They are not restricted to predetermined character classes. The game is played from a first-person perspective. The Stygian Abyss is inhabited by three factions vying for its control, Dark Elves, Dwarves and Shamblers. The player can also encounter non-player characters of no factional alignment. Supporting any faction will affect the balance of power in the Abyss, and how factions react to the player.

The game aims to present multiple unscripted solutions to scenarios present in the game, using simulated systems dubbed the "Improvisation Engine," allowing for emergent behaviour with a wide range of player options rather than discrete puzzle solutions.

== Development ==
Paul Neurath, the designer of the original Underworld games, had been in discussion with EA on-and-off for 20 years regarding working again in the Underworld universe. In 2014, EA granted Neurath a license to use the Underworld setting, lore and characters, though this did not allow for the use of the Ultima brand. With the license in place, Neurath founded OtherSide Entertainment, and Underworld Ascension was announced in July 2014.

In February 2015, OtherSide took the game, renamed Underworld Ascendant, to Kickstarter. OtherSide hoped to raise $600,000 towards development of the game, and the crowdfunding campaign concluded in March 2015 with $860,356 raised. Though successful, the campaign left some goals unfunded such as modding tools and cooperative gameplay. Recognizing that a demanding RPG such as Underworld Ascendant could not capture a mass-market audience, Neurath limited the game's budget, believing that, "if you’re spending 50 million dollars you need to reach as many people as possible."

With a core team of only six, Neurath describes OtherSide as a mini-studio with an "almost tribal culture", where "everybody in there knows each other really well, they know their strengths and weaknesses and foibles", allowing for close communication and collaboration. The team at OtherSide included other Looking Glass Studios veterans, such as Tim Stellmach, Steve Pearsall and Robb Waters. Advisors include Austin Grossman, the lead writer of Ultima Underworld II and Warren Spector, producer of the original Underworld games.

After the Kickstarter campaign, the game continued to raise funding on its website, going over US$932,000 with an estimated increase of more than US$60,000. In August 2017, 505 Games announced that they will serve as the game's publisher.

In February 2018, Steve Gaynor of Fullbright announced that two of the company's level designers, Nina Freeman and Tynan Wales—as well as the studio's 3D environment artist, Kate Craig—would be contributing additional work to Underworld Ascendant.

Though originally slated for a September 2018 release, OtherSide released the game for Windows via Steam on November 15, 2018. Ports for PlayStation 4 and Xbox One were released the following year on June 20 and June 26, respectively, while ports for Linux and macOS were released two months later on August 19.

== Reception ==
Reception

Aggregate score
Aggregator	Score
Metacritic	37/100

Review scores
Publication	Score
Eurogamer	Avoid
GameSpot	2/10
IGN	3/10
PC Gamer (US)	25/100
RPGamer	1.5/5

Upon release Underworld Ascendant received generally negative reviews, with an aggregated score of 37/100 on Metacritic. Many critics noted the game appeared to be in an unfinished state, with many software bugs and partially implemented features. IGN concluded the title was "just broken," GameSpot noted " wherever you go your progress is constantly chafed by an all-pervading lack of refinement." Rock, Paper, Shotgun declined to review the title, asserting that it was "just not in a fit state to be released, and as such, not in a fit state to be reviewed." Particular criticism was given to its limited and poorly telegraphed save system that, upon loading, would send players back to the start of the current level regardless of progress.

On February 14, 2019, Otherside Entertainment released a substantial update aimed at addressing many criticisms of the game at launch. This update brought with it the inclusion of a functional free save system, changes to the level design and game flow, refinements to gameplay mechanics and enemy behaviors, optimized lighting, and numerous bug fixes.
