= Space Rogue =

1989 video game

- Developer: Origin Systems
- Publishers: Origin Systems; Wave Brain (PC-98, X68000); Night Dive Studios (digital)
- Producer: Dallas Snell
- Designer: Paul Neurath
- Programmers: Paul Neurath; Mark "Adam" Baum; Steven Muchow; Ned Lerner; John Miles
- Artists: Keith Berdak; Jeff Dee; Denis R. Loubet
- Platforms: Amiga, Apple II, Atari ST, Commodore 64, MS-DOS, FM Towns, Classic Mac OS, PC-98, X68000
- Release: 1989: 1989 (Apple II, C64, MS-DOS, Mac) 1990 (Amiga, ST); JP: July 1990 (FM Towns); JP: September 24, 1990 (PC-98); JP: December 18, 1990 (X68000)
- Genres: Space combat simulator, role-playing
- Mode: Single-player

Space Rogue is a space flight simulation video game developed by Origin Systems and published by Origin Systems, Wave Brain, and Night Dive Studios. The game was released in 1989 for Apple II and Commodore 64; the series was later ported to MS-DOS, Classic Mac OS, Amiga, and Atari ST. The game was also released in the Japanese language for PC-98, X68000, and FM Towns. The FM Towns version had its intro remade with slight animations and new illustrations, along with scrolling Japanese text, and exclusive CD quality background music. Taking place within the Far Arm of the Milky Way galaxy, Space Rogue's main story revolves around the player character's efforts to pursue a career and undertake long-range goals beyond his immediate mission.

The game features elements of a role-playing game, like the much later X Rebirth and Elite Dangerous. It is notable for being the first game designed for Origin by Paul Neurath, who went on to found Blue Sky Productions (later renamed Looking Glass Studios).

Space Rogue can be considered as the spiritual predecessor to Origin's Wing Commander series. The press release for Space Rogue stated that it is "the first of its kind in science-fiction/3D space flight simulation. An ORIGIN Cinematic Experience", implying that Space Rogue was originally meant to be a series of its own ('Ultima in Space'), before later on Origin turned to the Wing Commander series instead. In 2016, Night Dive Studios reacquired the rights and re-released it.

== Plot ==
The player takes on the role of a crew member aboard the Princess Blue, who was sent by his captain to investigate a small derelict spacecraft, the Sunracer class Jolly Roger. While he is on board the Jolly Roger, a group of aliens called the Manchis attack the Princess Blue using their Vulture class ships, destroying it.

Left only with the Jolly Roger, little money, and no ties to anyone, the player can decide his fate from there. He could engage in piracy, hunt bounties, become an interstellar merchant, or become embroiled in the interplanetary politics.

== Gameplay ==
The game is played switching back and forth between a traditional top-down style role-playing game (e.g. Ultima) and a 3D space combat simulator (e.g. Elite). Visiting starships, space stations, outposts, planets, and so on. The player is able to travel from one solar system to another using the ancient Malir Gates' wormhole, a form of 'Star Gate'. A minigame of travelling through rings must be successfully completed before the player can reach his intended system; a failed minigame will cause an aborted interstellar travel.

During the 3D space flight part of the game, the game offers 3 points of view: first person, third-person, and cinematic.

There is also an arcade game called "Hive!" in the bars, that can be played by the player. The gameplay is a 2D top-down shooter, with the player moving on foot, attacking the incoming Manchis. The ship in the arcade game resembled the Sunracer class ship featured in the manual that came with Space Rogue. After completing five levels, the player can win money which can then be spent in the rest of Space Rogue.

== Reception ==
Reception

Review scores
Publication	Score
Computer Gaming World	96% (PC)
Dragon	4.5/5 (PC)
Zzap!64	97% (C64)

Award
Publication	Award
Zzap!64	Golden Medal Award

Computer Gaming World called Space Rogue an "interesting" blend of arcade action, role-playing interaction and economic strategy.

In the January 1990 edition of Dragon, Patricia Hartley and Kirk Lesser called it a refreshing science-fiction game with crisp graphics that gives the players the feeling of flying in space. They concluded by giving it a rating of 3.5 out of 5, saying that it was an enjoyable adventure that offers a lot of action for a minimal investment.

Compute! stated that "the best of flight simulation and role-playing come together in Space Rogue ... believably and with style".

One reviewer for Zzap64 in 1990 wrote: "I thought Elite could never be beaten as the greatest ever space game, but after playing Space Rogue for hours on end I've changed my mind. This totally outclasses Elite and is the best Space Game for any machine!"

In the June 1990 edition of Games International, Mike Siggins was very disappointed in this game, calling it "an almost exact lift of Elite". He concluded by giving it a very poor rating of 2 out of 10, saying that the players should save the money and stick with the original.

== Sources ==
- DeWitt, Omar (December 1989). "Life in the Fast Frame" (PDF). Computer Gaming World. No. 66.
- Guerra, Bob (December 1989). "Space Rogue". Compute!. Vol. 11, no. 115. ISSN 0194-357X.
- Hartley, Patricia; Lesser, Kirk (January 1990). "The Role of Computers" (PDF). Dragon. Vol. 14, no. 153. ISSN 0279-6848.
- Hogg, Robin (1990). "Space Rogue". Zzap!64. No. 58. ISSN 0954-867X.
- Rand, Paul (May 1990). "Space Rogue". VideoGames: The Ultimate Gaming Magazine. No. 102.
