= Arx Fatalis =

2002 video game

- European cover art
- Developer: Arkane Studios (Note: Additional development by Floodgate Entertainment; ported to Xbox by Wizarbox.)
- Publishers: Windows; JoWooD Productions; Arkane Studios (digital); Xbox; NA: DreamCatcher Interactive; EU: Mindscape
- Director: Raphaël Colantonio
- Producers: Friis Torben Tappert; Holly D. Kreie
- Designer: Raphaël Colantonio
- Programmer: Cyril Meynier
- Artist: Olivier Enselme-Trichard
- Composers: Kemal Amarasingham; Simon Amarasingham
- Platforms: Windows, Xbox
- Release: Windows: GER: 28 June 2002; UK: 8 November 2002; NA: 12 November 2002; AU: 2002; Xbox: GER: 12 December 2003; NA: 22 December 2003; UK: 13 February 2004
- Genres: Action role-playing, dungeon crawl
- Mode: Single-player

Arx Fatalis is a 2002 action role-playing game developed by Arkane Studios and released for Windows and Xbox. The game is played from a first-person perspective and is set on a world whose sun has failed, forcing the above-ground creatures to take refuge in caverns. The game's mechanics include the use of mouse gestures to cast spells. Arx Fatalis received mostly positive reviews from critics but was not commercially successful. In 2011, Arkane Studios released the game's source code under the GNU General Public License (GPL), though the game assets remain proprietary.

== Plot ==
Arx Fatalis (Latin for "fatal fortress") is set on a world whose sun has failed, forcing the above-ground creatures to take refuge in caverns. The action in Arx Fatalis takes place in one of these large caves, where the members of various races, including trolls, goblins, dwarves, and humans, have made their homes on various levels of the cave. The player awakens inside a prison cell and, after making his escape, eventually discovers his mission is to subvert and imprison the God of Destruction, Akbaa, who is trying to manifest itself in Arx.

== Gameplay ==
Arx Fatalis features somewhat open-ended gameplay, allowing the player to allocate skill points for their character type in skills such as spellcasting, weapons and armour, stealth, and so on. There are several side quests that can be undertaken. A simple crafting system involves enchanting ammunition and weapons, or creating items, such as a fishing rod (fishing pole and rope), keyrings (key and ring), or pies (dough and rolling pin, optional apple and optional bottle of wine). Raw food can be cooked, like rounds of bread, chicken drumsticks, or pies. The main plot line is non-linear with the player collecting the various items to forge a sword required to defeat Akbaa in a final showdown. Additional goals come up such as dealing with the rebels of Arx, the snake women and The King of Arx. The player can resolve the conflict between them all and experience several different endings to the conflict with different consequences somewhat affecting the story.

There is no dialogue system in Arx Fatalis. Rather, the player makes choices through actions which lead to different consequences. There are also multiple ways to finish quests and the player can progress through the game in several different ways. For example, the player can use force to kill enemies and break down doors, or they can use stealth and avoid enemies.

One of the intuitive interfaces in Arx Fatalis is the spellcasting system. Using the mouse and the control key, runes are drawn in mid-air with mouse gestures, which must be correctly drawn in order to successfully cast a spell. The player can find or buy different runes as gameplay progresses, combinations of which unlock new spells.

This gestural interface was simplified in the Xbox version to account for the limitations of the joypad. Each direction of the directional pad corresponds to a different mouse direction and different combinations of directions are entered with the directional pad to draw runes and correspondingly cast spells. A queue of up to three spells can be cast in advance, ready to be activated at the press of a button. There is also an instant magic mode that allows the player to simply select the desired spell they want to cast from a list of learned spells during gameplay.

In addition, Arx Fatalis supports a stealth mode that is active when a stealth icon is visible on the interface. In stealth mode, usually when a player is in dark or shadowy areas, non-player characters cannot see them.

== Development ==
Arx Fatalis was the first title of French developer Arkane Studios, founded in 1999 by the game's lead designer and CEO Raphaël Colantonio. The design of Arx Fatalis was influenced by games from the now-defunct Looking Glass Studios, especially Ultima Underworld. Arkane Studios have stated that Arx Fatalis was intended to be Ultima Underworld III; however, while Raphaël Colantonio had support from Paul Neurath, one of the original developers of Ultima Underworld, Electronic Arts, who owned the rights, would not allow Arkane to make a sequel with their intellectual property unless he accepted some of their provisions. Colantonio refused to accept this and instead had Arkane set out on the game in the spirit of Ultima Underworld. Colantonio had difficulty in getting a publisher; with finances nearly exhausted, they had signed one small publisher who had gone bankrupt within the month, but later secured JoWooD Productions for publication, eventually releasing in 2002.

Arx Fatalis was released for Windows initially in Germany on 28 June 2002 before releasing in the UK on 8 November 2002 and in North America on 12 November 2002. It was ported the Xbox in North America on 22 December 2003 and in Europe on 13 February 2004.

On 14 January 2011, Arkane Studios released a 1.21 patch and the game's source code under the terms of the GNU General Public License (GPL). Based upon this source code, the Arx Libertatis project was formed to fix bugs and incompatibilities, and to port the game to operating systems such as Linux, FreeBSD and the OpenPandora handheld. As of April 2022, the most recent Arx Libertatis release is version 1.2.1.

Several fan-made translations of the game have also been made, including to Turkish and Korean.

== Reception ==
Reception

Aggregate scores
Aggregator	Score	
Aggregator	PC	Xbox
GameRankings	80%	73%
Metacritic	77/100	71/100

Review scores
Publication	Score	
Publication	PC	Xbox
1Up.com	N/A	B−
Computer Games Magazine	3.5/5	A−
Computer Gaming World	4/5	N/A
Edge	N/A	4/10
Eurogamer	7/10	7/10
Game Informer	N/A	7.5/10
GamePro	N/A	3/5
GameRevolution	B	N/A
GameSpot	8.4/10	8.3/10
GameSpy	3.5/5	3/5
GameZone	8.3/10	8.3/10
IGN	8/10	7.8/10
Official Xbox Magazine (US)	N/A	6.5/10
PC Gamer (US)	85%	N/A

While the game was well received, it was considered a commercial failure. The PC version of Arx Fatalis received "generally favourable reviews", while the Xbox version received "average" reviews, according to the review aggregation website Metacritic.

Arx Fatalis was released after the more successful fantasy role-playing games The Elder Scrolls III: Morrowind and Neverwinter Nights, with reviewers stating that although it is not as open as Morrowind, it will appeal to fans that like dungeon-crawler RPGs, paying homage to games like Ultima: Underworld.

GameSpot's Greg Kasavin was pleased with the experience that the PC version offered, stating that "Arx Fatalis is entertaining and great looking, and it should especially appeal to fans of other atmospheric first-person games, including Thief: The Dark Project, System Shock 2, and Deus Ex, let alone this year's Morrowind. Though marred by some technical issues (many of which have already been addressed by patches) and at times confusing to navigate in, Arx Fatalis nevertheless delivers a memorable, original role-playing experience", and IGN's Dan Adams enjoyed the same PC version, stating that "The atmosphere, spell system, puzzles, voices, and story were good and interesting enough to give me a pretty enjoyable experience."

Arx Fatalis was nominated as one of 2002's best computer role-playing game by Computer Gaming World, GameSpot and the Academy of Interactive Arts & Sciences. It was also a runner-up for RPG Vault's "Surprise of the Year" and "Debut Game of the Year" awards, and for GameSpot's "Best Sound" and the Game Developers Choice Awards' "Rookie Studio of the Year" prizes. It won RPG Vault's award for sound design that year. The editors of Computer Gaming World wrote that Arx Fatalis "has hands-down the most annoying interface of the year, but fortunately, it also sports sharp graphics [...] and a great story".

== Legacy ==
Arx Fatalis' critical praise gave Arkane the opportunity to work with Valve to develop a new title on their Source engine, and Colantonio opted to make a sequel, Arx Fatalis 2. However, the poor sales of the first game made it difficult to find a publisher. Arkane was eventually approached by Ubisoft and asked to apply the Arx Fatalis game engine to their Might and Magic. This became Dark Messiah of Might and Magic, released in October 2006. It refined the first-person melee combat of Arx Fatalis with a lesser emphasis on role-playing elements. During this time, Colantonio moved from France to Austin, Texas, leaving the main studio in the hands of his colleagues while he set up Arkane Austin in June 2006. Colantonio left the studio in 2017 to concentrate on smaller projects.

To celebrate Arkane Studios' 20th anniversary, the game was made available for free on PC from 28 to 31 May 2020.
