= Paul Neurath =

Video game designer

- Occupation: Video game designer
- Years active: 1986–present
- Known for: Looking Glass Studios, OtherSide Entertainment

Paul Neurath is a video game designer and creative director. He founded both Blue Sky Productions (later renamed Looking Glass Studios) and Floodgate Entertainment. He was the creative director of Zynga Boston. In 2014 he founded OtherSide Entertainment, that developed Underworld Ascendant, the third game in the Underworld series.

Neurath had a game credited to him as early as 1986, the computer adaptation of the Steve Jackson Games board game Ogre. As Creative Director at Looking Glass Studios, he oversaw such gaming titles as System Shock 2, Thief, Terra Nova and Flight Unlimited, as well as Ultima Underworld and its sequel.

== Games credited ==
Year	Title
1986	Ogre
1986	Deep Space: Operation Copernicus
1988	Autoduel
1989	Space Rogue
1989	Omega
1992	Ultima Underworld: The Stygian Abyss
1993	Ultima Underworld II: Labyrinth of Worlds
1995	Flight Unlimited
1995	Descent
1996	Terra Nova: Strike Force Centauri
1997	Flight Unlimited II
1998	Thief: The Dark Project
1999	Thief Gold
1999	System Shock 2
1999	Flight Unlimited III
2000	Thief II: The Metal Age
2002	Jane's Attack Squadron
2002	Arx Fatalis
2003	Neverwinter Nights: Shadows of Undrentide
2018	Underworld Ascendant
