= Game Maker's Toolkit =

YouTube channel about videogame design

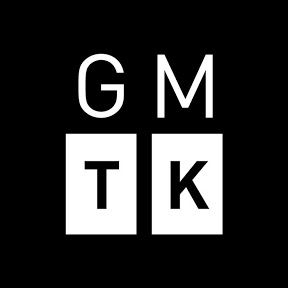
- Game Maker's Toolkit logo
- Born: Mark Brown
- Occupation: Video game journalist

YouTube information
- Channel: Game Maker's Toolkit
- Years active: 2014–present
- Genres: Game studies; Video game journalism
- Subscribers: 1.74 million
- Views: 219.6 million
- Last updated: 29 July 2026
- Website: gamemakerstoolkit.com

Game Maker's Toolkit (GMTK) is a video game analysis video series created by British journalist Mark Brown. Beginning in 2014, the series examines video game design and aims to encourage developers to improve their craft. It is hosted on YouTube and funded via Patreon.

Additional topics include game accessibility and level design. Since 2017, Brown has also hosted an annual GMTK game jam on itch.io. In 2024, he released a puzzle game, Mind Over Magnet, and in 2025 he released Word Play, a Scrabble inspired roguelike deck-building game.

== History ==
From 2009, Mark Brown worked as a freelance writer and critic, contributing to GamesRadar, Wired, The Escapist, Edge, Polygon and Eurogamer among others. Brown joined Pocket Gamer, a British mobile games publication, in August 2012 as news editor and later as features editor. In September 2013, he released Pixel This!, a nonogram game developed using Codea, on the App Store.

Brown began releasing episodes of Game Maker's Toolkit in November 2014; each discusses a certain issue in video game design and its implementation in specific games. The series was inspired by Every Frame a Painting. Brown launched a crowdfunding profile for the series on Patreon in 2015. He left his position as editor-at-large at Pocket Gamer in January 2017 to focus on Game Maker's Toolkit.

In 2016, Brown started a segment, Boss Keys dedicated to analysing the layout and design of dungeons in The Legend of Zelda franchise. Brown developed a mapping system to describe layouts of the dungeons. In the second season, which began in July 2018, Brown discusses the layout of game worlds in the metroidvania genre, such as those in the Metroid series. A second segment, Designing for Disability, launched in July 2018, explores accessibility in video games. It describes obstacles which may prevent some people from enjoying specific games and presents guidelines and practices that make video games more welcoming for players with disabilities.

In September 2021, he began Developing, a series focusing on the development of his puzzle game Mind Over Magnet, which released on November 13, 2024.

In May 2025, Brown announced his second game, a roguelike Scrabble game called Word Play, based on his entry for the GMTK Patreon Jam 2024.

== Reception ==
Brown's Game Maker's Toolkit videos have been covered by video game websites, such as Gamasutra, Kotaku and Rock, Paper, Shotgun. Designing for Disability series is included in Polygon's summary of "The best video essays of 2018" and its writer names Brown "one of the most measured and meticulous people" in video game criticism. The Telegraph mentions Brown as one of "20 gaming YouTubers you should be following", describing GMTK as "an intelligent look into the design philosophy behind popular games". Arts magazine Hyperallergic includes GMTK video "The Challenge of Cameras" in its roundup of web documentaries.

== Game Maker's Toolkit Game Jam ==
Game Maker's Toolkit has hosted an annual game jam on itch.io since 2017. Competing developers have a limited time period to design and create a video game fitting a theme unveiled at the beginning of the jam. Between 2017 and 2023, the time period was 48 hours, which was extended to 96 hours starting in 2024. The themes are design challenges.

Year	Date	Theme	# of participants	
Year	Date	Theme	Creators	Games
2017	14–17 July	Downwell's Dual Purpose Design	2,857	731
2018	31 August – 2 September	Genre without mechanic	3,313	1,029
2019	2–4 August	Only one	7,590	2,648
2020	10–12 July	Out of control	18,326	5,477
2021	11–13 June	Joined together	21,967	5,817
2022	15–17 July	Roll of the dice	22,077	6,168
2023	7–9 July	Roles Reversed	~23,100	6,900
2024	16–20 August	Built to Scale	~32,500	7,725
2025	30 July – 3 August	Loop	~38,000	9,594
2026	22–26 July	Count Down	~37,400	10,532

== Works ==
- Brown, Mark; Anderson, Sky LaRell (26 October 2020). "Designing for Disability: Evaluating the State of Accessibility Design in Video Games". Games and Culture. 16 (6): 702–718. doi:10.1177/1555412020971500. ISSN 1555-4120. S2CID 228982342.
