= OtherSide Entertainment =

American video game developer

OtherSide Entertainment, Inc.
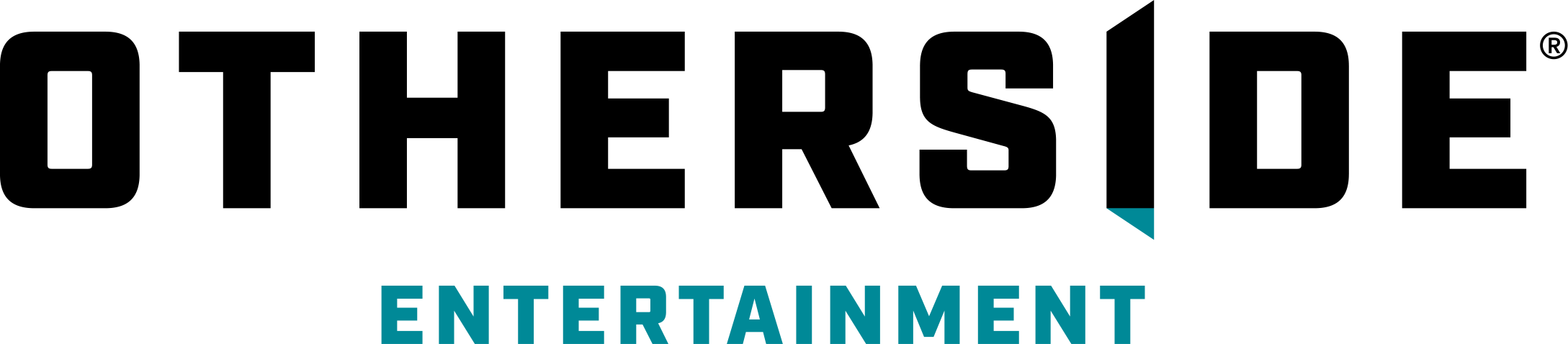
- Formerly: Cerulean Sky Productions, Inc. (2013–2014)
- Type: Private
- Industry: Video games
- Founded: 2013; 13 years ago
- Founder: Paul Neurath
- Headquarters: Boston, Massachusetts, U.S.
- Number of locations: 2 studios (2016)
- Key people: Paul Neurath (creative director); Warren Spector (studio director)
- Website: otherside-e.com

OtherSide Entertainment, Inc. is an American video game developer based in Boston, Massachusetts, founded in 2013 by Looking Glass Studios co-founder Paul Neurath. In June 2016, the company opened a second studio in Austin, Texas, led by Warren Spector. OtherSide developed Underworld Ascendant (2018), a spiritual successor to Looking Glass's Ultima Underworld series, and is developing a new intellectual property. They were acquired by Aonic.

== History ==
Prior to OtherSide, Paul Neurath had been a video game designer for Origin Systems and in 1990 founded Blue Sky Productions, which would later become Looking Glass Studios. Looking Glass developed numerous games that are considered highly influential on computer gaming, including System Shock and its sequel, the Ultima Underworld series, and the Thief series. Neurath had been the principal designer for the Ultima Underworld series. Following the closure of Looking Glass in 2000 and later the Boston offices of Zynga in 2012, Neurath opted to found OtherSide Entertainment (originally named Cerulean Sky Productions) in 2013, to bring the Underworld series to modern gaming. The studio includes many former Looking Glass developers, including Nate Wells and Tim Stellmach. The studio name "OtherSide" is a play on the name "Looking Glass".

In February 2016, Warren Spector joined OtherSide as its studio director. Spector had been advising the studio since its creation, and stated that he would establish and lead an Austin, Texas, studio for OtherSide by June that year.

Hasbro revealed at its February 2021 Investor Event that it was working with the studio in the "longer term". In March 2022, Spector stated that the studio was working on a Dungeons & Dragons game with Hasbro subsidiary Wizards of the Coast. Jason Schreier, Bloomberg News, commented that the cancellation of multiple unnamed video game projects by Wizards of the Coast in January 2023 led to a small layoff at the company and that "the reorganization will land hard for several independent studios such as Boston-based OtherSide Entertainment and Bellevue, Washington-based Hidden Path Entertainment, both of which were working on games for Wizards of the Coast".

== Games ==
OtherSide was founded initially to create a sequel to Ultima Underworld, titled Underworld Ascendant. Neurath, as the designer for Ultima Underworld, wanted to bring back the Underworld franchise, "making it more vital than ever before".

In December 2015, OtherSide announced that it was also working on System Shock 3, with it set to be published by Starbreeze Studios. Having made a deal with the owners of the System Shock franchise, Nightdive Studios, Otherside intended to develop both the long-awaited sequel and potentially further titles in the series. However, in February 2019 due to financial troubles, Starbreeze sold the distribution rights back to Nightdive, dropping out of the development and funding for System Shock 3.

In May 2020, OtherSide confirmed that Tencent obtained the rights to develop future System Shock titles. However, Spector affirmed that OtherSide is still involved in its development alongside Tencent.

In March 2022, Spector stated that System Shock 3 is not being developed by OtherSide. It remains to be seen if the game is canceled. They also confirmed that they are working on a new IP. In November 2022, the name of the IP was revealed as Argos: Riders on the Storm.

In January 2023, It was reported a Dungeons and Dragons game being developed by OtherSide was canceled.

Year	Title	Platform(s)	Publisher(s)
2016	Underworld Overlord	Android	OtherSide Entertainment
2018	Underworld Ascendant	Linux, macOS, Windows	505 Games
2026	Thick as Thieves	Windows	Megabit Publishing
TBA	Argos: Riders on the Storm	TBA	TBA
