= Warren Spector =

American game designer

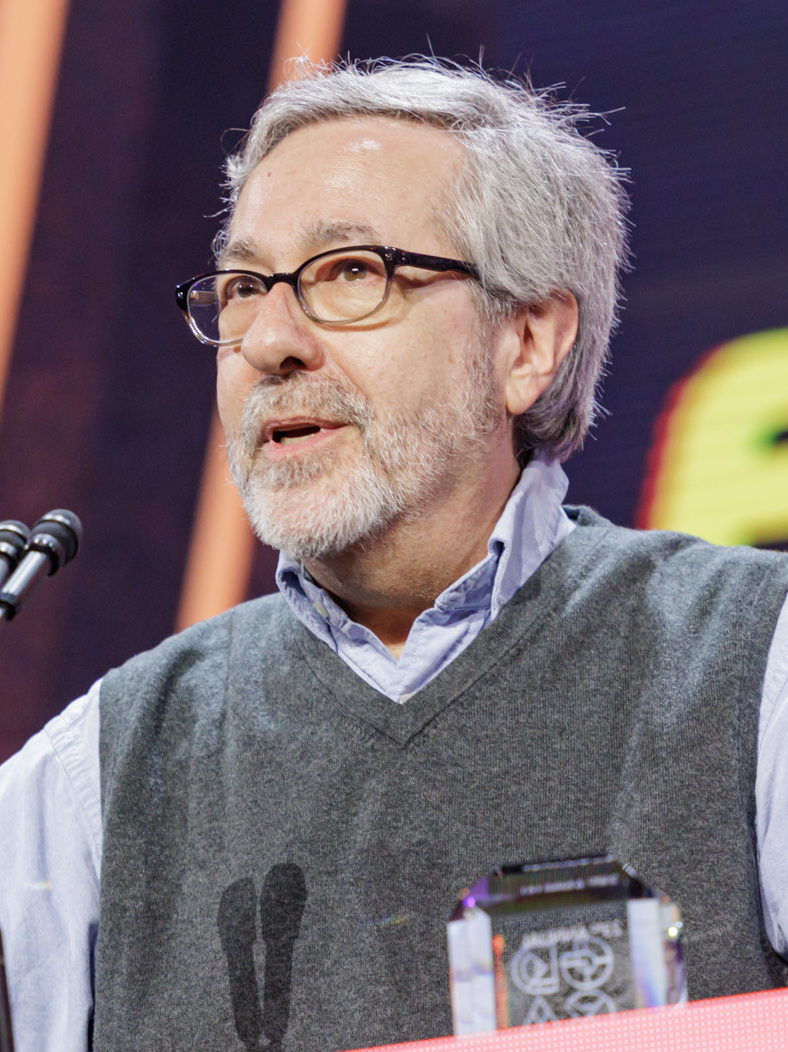
- Spector in 2023
- Born: October 2, 1955 (age 71)
- Education: Northwestern University (B.S.); University of Texas at Austin (M.A.)
- Occupations: Role-playing and video game designer; director; writer; producer; production designer
- Years active: 1983–2026
- Spouse: Caroline L. Spector (m. 1987)

Warren Evan Spector (born October 2, 1955) is an American retired role-playing and video game designer, director, writer, producer and production designer. He is known for creating immersive sim games, which give players a wide variety of choices in how to progress. Consequences of those choices are then shown in the simulated game world in subsequent levels or missions. He is best known for the critically acclaimed video game Deus Ex that embodies the choice and consequence philosophy while combining elements of the first-person shooter, role-playing, and adventure game genres. While employed by Looking Glass Studios, he was involved in the creation of several acclaimed titles including Ultima Underworld, Ultima Underworld II, System Shock, and Thief: The Dark Project.

== Early life ==
Spector grew up in Manhattan, which he described as a sometimes hostile environment where "short, pudgy, Jewish kids didn't fare well". He showed an intense devotion to whatever topic became his focus at any given time, from dinosaurs and airplanes as a small boy, to an interest in law by the sixth grade. At age 13, Spector had decided he wanted to be a film critic, and by high school, his interests expanded to include cars and basketball.

Spector and game designer Greg Costikyan were friends since high school.

Spector attended Northwestern University in Illinois, still intending to become a film critic, stating that he "knew more about movies than a lot of my teachers". Spector earned his BS in Communications at Northwestern, and went on to earn his MA in Radio-TV-Film at the University of Texas at Austin in 1980. His thesis was a critical history of Warner Bros. cartoons.

All through college, Spector enjoyed gaming, and recalls that he "played Avalon Hill games mainly, and a lot of OGRE and G.E.V. games, and Rivets from Metagaming. It was all boardgames until I became friends with science-fiction writers who were into D&D games, so I gave the game a try. I was hooked." Spector taught several undergraduate classes at the University of Texas at Austin, on the history, theory, and criticism of film.

== Career ==
=== Tabletop role-playing games ===
In 1983, after a job at the Harry Ransom Center as an archivist in charge of the David O. Selznick collection ended after a few months, Spector recalls that he "was sitting around, wondering how I was going to pay the next month's rent, when I got a call from Chris Frink. He was a writer for a weekly entertainment magazine I used to edit in college. Anyway, he said that he was now editor of Space Gamer magazine and asked if I wanted a job. So, in the fall of 1983, I started as an editor." Within a short time, Spector became the editor-in-chief for all Steve Jackson Games products, the company that owned and published Space Gamer magazine. Spector began producing role-playing games for the company, stating, "I supervised game development, typesetting, and the art and graphic departments." Greg Costikyan developed Toon (1984), based on an idea by Jeff Dee; Costikyan only intended the game to be an article in Fantasy Gamer magazine, but Spector liked the idea and expanded it into a complete role-playing system, publishing it as the first full role-playing game from Steve Jackson Games. Spector wrote the early Paranoia game supplement Send in the Clones (1985) with Allen Varney. Spector also worked on the GURPS role-playing game. In March 1987 he was hired by TSR, initially working on games such as Top Secret/S.I. and the Marvel Super Heroes role-playing game. He also worked on The Bullwinkle and Rocky Party Roleplaying Game, and the second edition AD&D rules set, as well as board games, choose-your-own-adventure books, and novels. Spector spent some time in TSR's research and development department, helping launch Spelljammer.

=== Origin and Looking Glass Studios ===
In 1989, Spector entered the video game industry and joined Origin, where he co-produced Ultima VI and Wing Commander and produced Ultima Underworld and Ultima Underworld II, Ultima VII Part Two: Serpent Isle, System Shock, Wings of Glory, Bad Blood, Martian Dreams, and others. He later became general manager of Looking Glass Austin. He worked briefly on Dark Camelot, which later became Thief: The Dark Project. However, Spector left Looking Glass soon afterward, just before Thief shipped, to pursue other interests. According to Spector, his decision to dissolve the Austin branch was prompted by the company's ongoing financial struggles and the realization that "continued existence of the Austin Studio was going to jeopardise the existence of Looking Glass overall".

=== Ion Storm ===
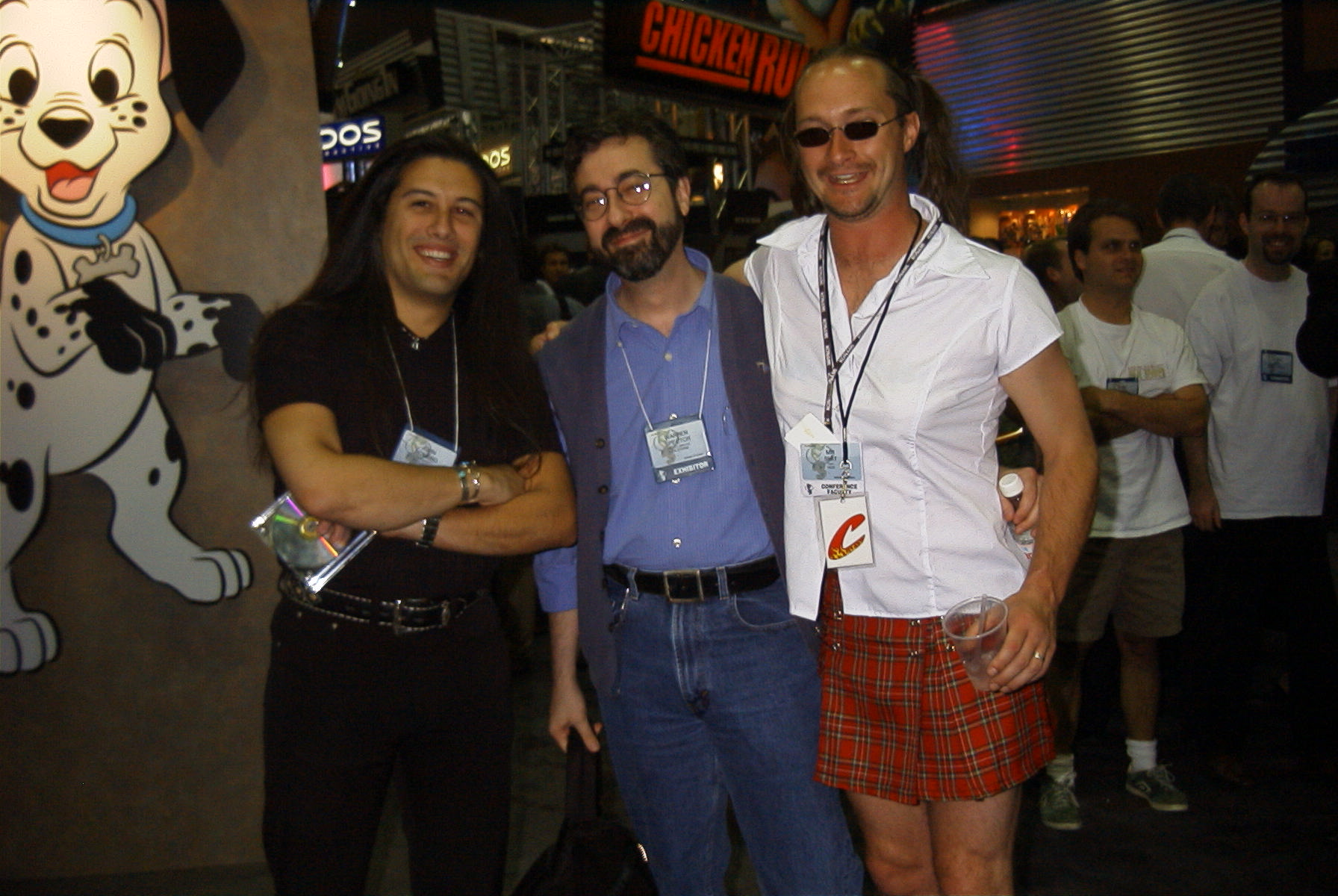
Spector, John Romero and Mike Wilson in attendance at E3 2000

In 1996, Spector was about to sign a contract with EA to do an unannounced project (which was revealed to be a "Command & Conquer Role-Playing Game") when he got a call from John Romero to join him at Ion Storm; Romero persuaded Spector by offering him the chance to make the game of his dreams with no creative interference and a big marketing budget. Spector later agreed. In 1997 he founded Ion Storm's Austin development studio, and his "dream project" later became the award-winning action/RPG called Deus Ex. As Ion Storm studio director, he oversaw development of Deus Ex: Invisible War (2003) and Thief: Deadly Shadows (2004). In 2004, Spector left Ion Storm to "pursue personal interests outside the company". Ion Storm was closed by owners Eidos Interactive in February 2005.

=== Disney ===
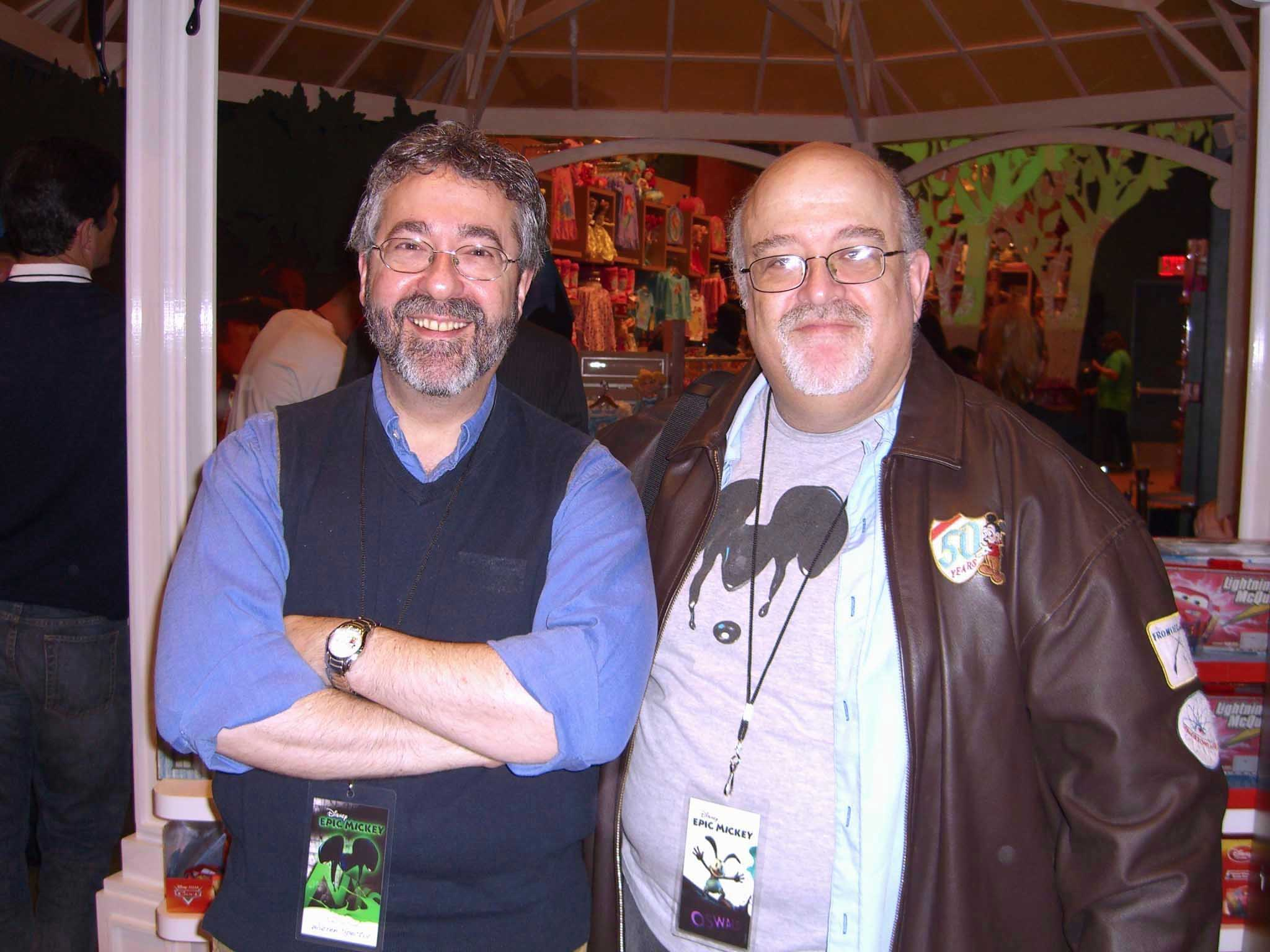
Spector with Peter David at the November 30, 2010 Times Square Disney Store launch party for Epic Mickey for which David wrote two tie-in products

In 2005 he established Junction Point Studios. Somewhere between the end of 2005 and mid-2007, Junction Point Studios and Spector worked on a third episode for Half-Life 2; this was ultimately cancelled by Valve. In July 2007, Disney Interactive acquired Junction Point Studios. His first project with Disney Interactive was a project involving Disney characters, titled Epic Mickey. The game is steampunk-themed and designed exclusively for the Wii; the game was released in 2010.

Disney closed Junction Point Studios in January 2013, and Spector left the company.

=== University of Texas ===
After leaving Disney Interactive, Spector worked with the University of Texas at Austin to build a new post-baccalaureate game development program – the Denius-Sams Gaming Academy. He worked with UT staff to create a curriculum and plan out courses and labs.

=== OtherSide Entertainment ===
In February 2016, Spector announced he had joined OtherSide Entertainment, a studio formed by Paul Neurath in 2014 and includes several previous Looking Glass developers, as their Studio Director, after having been in an advisory role from its inception. He will be helping the studio with their current development of System Shock 3 and Underworld Ascendant, the spiritual successor to Ultima Underworld which both Spector and Neurath worked on in the early 1990s. Though Spector had completed only two-and-a-half years of a three-year commitment to the University of Texas, he jumped at the chance to work on System Shock when Neurath approached him with the offer. He also believed the opportunity would help garner good favor from players that had been disappointed by his choice to work on Epic Mickey, even though he states that game had still been based on his past design philosophy used in the development of System Shock and Deus Ex. OtherSide Entertainment announced in November 2022 that Spector is working on a multiplayer game with immersive sim elements entitled Argos: Riders on the Storm, based on an original intellectual property. However, OtherSide announced in June 2026 that development of Argos would be canceled, laying off 17 employees.

On August 18, 2026, Spector announced his retirement from game development, citing his age, health, and the state of the industry as factors.

== Personal life ==
Spector met Caroline Skelley in 1984 at a comic book store in Austin, Texas, where she was employed. After Skelley got a job at Steve Jackson Games, she and Spector began a relationship. They were married on April 11, 1987. The couple sometimes worked together, such as on game supplements for the Marvel Super Heroes role-playing game. The two reside in Austin, Texas. Caroline is a fantasy writer.

== Credits ==
=== Video games ===
Year	Title	Role	Publisher
1990	Ultima VI: The False Prophet	Producer/writer	Origin Systems
1990	Wing Commander	Producer	Origin Systems
1990	Wing Commander: The Secret Missions	Producer	Origin Systems
1990	Bad Blood	Producer	Origin Systems
1991	Ultima: Worlds of Adventure 2: Martian Dreams	Producer	Origin Systems
1992	Ultima Underworld: The Stygian Abyss	Producer	Origin Systems
1993	Ultima Underworld II: Labyrinth of Worlds	Producer	Origin Systems
1993	Ultima VII, Part Two: Serpent Isle	Producer	Origin Systems
1993	Ultima VII, Part Two: The Silver Seed	Producer	Origin Systems; Electronic Arts
1994	Wing Commander: Privateer – Righteous Fire	Producer	Origin Systems
1994	System Shock	Producer	Origin Systems
1995	Wings of Glory	Producer	Electronic Arts
1995	CyberMage: Darklight Awakening	Producer	Electronic Arts
1995	Crusader: No Remorse	Producer	Electronic Arts
2000	Deus Ex	Director/Producer	Eidos Interactive
2003	Deus Ex: Invisible War	Studio Director	Eidos Interactive
2004	Thief: Deadly Shadows	Studio Director	Eidos Interactive
2010	Epic Mickey	Creative Director	Disney Interactive Studios
2012	Epic Mickey 2: The Power of Two	VP	Disney Interactive Studios
2018	Underworld Ascendant	Creative consultant	505 Games
2026	Thick As Thieves	Producer	Megabit Publishing
TBA	System Shock 3	TBA	TBA
TBA	Argos: Riders on the Storm	TBA	TBA

=== Role-playing games ===
- Toon – Developer (1984), Steve Jackson Games
- Bullwinkle and Rocky Role-Playing Party Game – Editor (1988), TSR, Inc.
- Uncanny X-Men Boxed Set – Editor (1990), TSR, Inc.

=== Novels ===
- Double Agent: Royal Pain/The Hollow Earth Affair by Richard Merwin/Warren Spector ISBN 0-88038-551-0

=== Comics ===
- DuckTales – Boom! Studios – (2011)

=== Gamebooks ===
- One Thing After Another – Puffin Books – (Marvel Super Heroes Gamebook #5)

== Awards ==
On 2016, Spector won the Honorific Award at the Fun & Serious Game Festival.
