= Liberty Island (Deus Ex) =

Fictional depiction of Liberty Island

- View of the level, looking towards the skyline
- First appearance: Deus Ex (2000)
- Created by: Ion Storm
- Genre: Science fiction

In-universe information
- Type: Island
- Location: New York Harbor

Liberty Island is the first level of the 2000 action role-playing video game Deus Ex, the first game in the Deus Ex franchise. Based on the New York City upbringing of designer Warren Spector and functioning as a tutorial level, it is set on a facsimile of the real-life Liberty Island, where the player character, JC Denton, has been sent to quell an armed insurgency that has seized the headquarters of UNATCO, a fictional United Nations counterterrorist organization. The level was well-regarded by critics for being the player's introduction to the game's immersive sim design and the many potential means to clear the level, and is known as an iconic video game location. It is also notorious for depicting a damaged Statue of Liberty and missing World Trade Center, despite being released prior to the September 11 attacks.

== Level content ==
JC Denton starts out on the Liberty Island docks, where he is given a brief, but information-dense introduction by his brother, Paul Denton, advising him of both lethal and non-lethal ways of "eliminating resistance". Already equipped with a pistol and stun gun, Denton is allowed to choose from one of three additional weapons – the sniper rifle, mini crossbow, and GEP gun rocket launcher. Of the three, the GEP gun ('Guided Explosive Projectile') is generally considered the most useful, as it can destroy a patrolling security robot, and the other two can be obtained within the level itself. Ironically, Paul criticizes the player's choice of the less destructive sniper rifle, despite being part of a law enforcement force. The player is given their main objectives after selecting the weapon. Nearby, the player can also use a crowbar to obtain binoculars, a lockpick, a multi-tool, and a bioelectric cell from nearby wooden crates. Upon proceeding into the level, Denton's handler, Alex Jacobsen, advises him to shoot on sight, demonstrating a marked difference between UNATCO's stated policy of non-lethality, as suggested by Paul, and its orders in practice.

The player can head to the north dock to meet a UNATCO informant, Harley Filben. Filben gives Denton the key to the statue after the player promises not to kill the NSF commander. The player can either use the front door, or a stack of crates in back to enter the statue. Once inside, the player can free Gunther Hermann, a top UNATCO agent, who is being held in a cell on the compound's lobby level. Finally, the player climbs the statue to interrogate NSF commander Leo Gold. The player can either kill the commander or talk him into surrendering without becoming hostile. Either way, this allows UNATCO to take over the island. Denton then enters UNATCO HQ, meeting other personal of UNATCO, and his boss, Joseph Manderley who gives him financial compensation for his actions and a briefing on his next mission. Denton then leaves UNATCO to travel to his next mission in Battery Park via a UNATCO boat. The UNATCO HQ is later revisited multiple times throughout the rest of the game though the rest of Liberty Island is inaccessible.

== Development ==
Game designer Harvey Smith had first intended the level to start with Denton showing up for work and meeting his colleagues, but was inspired by Ultima Underworld (1992), one of his favorite games, to start the player in a hostile environment. Liberty Island was intended as a vertical slice to demonstrate the gameplay. It was created due to Warren Spector having grown up in New York City, leading him to want to feature locations such as Battery Park and Liberty Island. Smith was not familiar with New York, but was excited by the island's large, open space. He stated it was "different and exciting" to design a level around something large. He stated it was indicative of the "go anywhere game" they were attempting to make, despite the long sightlines causing frame rates on some machines to "nosedive".

Developers were conflicted on the amount of freedom the player should be allowed during the level. Some on the team argued that the level should be based on a single set of powers, while others advocated for a completely different set, and yet others believed all possibilities should be open to the player at all times. Some also believed there should be clear paths indicating each style of play, whereas other team members advocated for an open area. Ultimately, the team developed rules that there should be negative space between encounters, leading to Liberty Island being designed with empty areas for "quiet, reflective moments". Roughly halfway through the game's development, it was decided that each path should support at least a combat, stealth and hacking approach.

The first person outside the development team to playtest the level was Caroline Spector, wife of Warren Spector. The level contained physics simulation of objects, which was at the time a novelty. The team assumed the level had failed at first, because she spent 20 minutes experimenting on the dock and playing with the objects. However, shortly afterwards, she told the developers that it was the most fun she had in a game, causing them to double down on the game's object physics. Liberty Island was ultimately the last level to be finished – the developers believed it was "high stakes", and were anxious to get it correct.

== Reception ==
Andy Kelly of PC Gamer described Liberty Island as "one of the greatest opening gambits in PC gaming", as well as the most iconic level in the game. Calling it a "trial by fire", he remarked that it was "the perfect introduction to Deus Ex’s unsurpassed freedom of play", noting the numerous ways the player could infiltrate the complex. However, he stated that it was a difficult level, especially for first-time players. Tom Francis of the same publication claimed that he always used Liberty Island as an example of what made Deus Ex great, calling it "huge for an open-air level" despite being small by real-world standards. He further elaborated that it "showcased everything that was unique and exciting about the game's open-ended approach to missions, demand for tactical planning, and constant surprises".

William Hughes of The A.V. Club stated that Liberty Island was the most clear example of the philosophy of choice present in Deus Ex, forcing players to ask questions more complex than simply which weapon to use. Citing the level's patrolling, automated security robot, Hughes pointed out how the player can either choose to destroy it with the GEP gun, attempt to sneak past it by hacking a security camera, ignore it and head for the back entrance, or use a nearby EMP grenade to disable it. Stating that it pioneered the idea of a video game remembering the player's decisions, he expressed the belief that the level felt like a "digital playground" with "unprecedented levels of choice".

Wireframe magazine called Liberty Island an "iconic opening mission", a "fine tutorial", and an example of a setting that complemented the core gameplay. Describing it as both an introduction to freeform gameplay and a means to build on the game's lore, the magazine stated that the "simple objective" of infiltrating the Statue of Liberty allowed the player to pivot around a "fixed point". They also noted that the level's entire makeup changes if the player is spotted by a security camera, functioning as a "twist" that changes the player's path. Justin Keverne of Game Developer described the island as "close enough to feel like a real place" despite its lack of complete accuracy, calling the "sensation of reality" common to locations throughout the game.

The content in the level itself was later considered prescient in predicting the rise of terrorist threats and wealth inequality in the 21st century. Due to artist error, the Twin Towers were omitted from the level's skybox, itself sparking conspiracies as it was seen as an uncanny prediction, as the game had been released a year prior to 9/11. The end of the level reveals that the attackers were simply unable to obtain the Ambrosia vaccine due to its distribution to the rich and powerful, casting the morality of killing them into doubt. The Statue of Liberty is depicted without its head, a metaphorically significant visual reminiscent of Planet of the Apes (1968) that indicates the loss of democracy, and showing that war in the 21st century would be waged with symbolic acts. Keverne called the level's symbolism "heavy-handed, but effective". The foggy, dark, nighttime setting also represents the declining health of civilization.

== Legacy ==
Liberity Island returns as the final level in Deus Ex: Invisible War though its layout is different to Deus Ex where it's revealed that following the collapse event that occurred in-between the two games, the island and UNATCO HQ were abandoned and also effectively turned into an Ice Cap by JC Denton following his merger with Helios through nanotechnology.

Liberty Island was described as influencing Smith in subsequent games, such as Dishonored (2012).
