= Liberty Island (disambiguation) =

Liberty Island is a federally owned island in Upper New York Bay in the United States, notable for containing the Statue of Liberty.

Liberty Island may also refer to:

- Liberty Island (California), an unrelated, mostly-flooded island in California
- Liberty Island (Deus Ex), a level in the video game Deus Ex based on the New York location
- Liberty Island (horse), a Japanese racehorse
