= TNM =

TNM may refer to:

- TNM staging system, a cancer staging system
- Teniente R. Marsh Airport, the main airport in Antarctica
- Telekom Networks Malawi, a Malawian mobile telecommunications company
- Tetranitromethane, an organic oxidizer
- The Nameless Mod, a total conversion mod released in 2009 for the game Deus Ex
- Thomas Nelson (publisher) (NYSE stock symbol), a publishing firm that began in Scotland in 1798
- Tokyo National Museum, the oldest and largest museum in Japan
- The News Minute, an Indian online publication
- Texas Nationalist Movement, a Texan political organization
