= Deus Ex (video game) =

2000 video game

- Cover art featuring protagonist JC Denton
- Developer: Ion Storm (Note: Mac OS port developed by Westlake Interactive. Remastered co-developed by Eidos-Montréal and Aspyr.)
- Publisher: Eidos Interactive (Note: Mac OS version and Remastered published by Aspyr.)
- Director: Warren Spector
- Producer: Warren Spector
- Designer: Harvey Smith
- Programmers: Chris Norden; Albert Yarusso; Scott Martin
- Artists: Jay Lee; Nghia Lam; Mike Washburn
- Writers: Sheldon Pacotti; Chris Todd; Austin Grossman
- Composers: Alexander Brandon; Dan Gardopée; Michiel van den Bos; Reeves Gabrels
- Series: Deus Ex
- Engine: Unreal Engine 1
- Platforms: Windows; Mac OS; PlayStation 2; PlayStation 5
- Release: June 23, 2000: Microsoft Windows; NA: June 23, 2000; AU: July 27, 2000; UK: August 4, 2000 Mac OS; NA: July 13, 2000 PlayStation 2; NA: March 26, 2002; EU: June 7, 2002; AU: December 13, 2002 Remastered Microsoft Windows, Nintendo Switch, PlayStation 5 & Xbox Series X/S; WW: TBA
- Genres: Action role-playing, first-person shooter, stealth
- Modes: Single-player, multiplayer

Deus Ex is a 2000 action role-playing game developed by Ion Storm and published by Eidos Interactive. Originally released for Microsoft Windows, it was released for Mac OS the same year, and for PlayStation 2 in 2002. A remaster for modern platforms was originally scheduled for release in February 2026, but was later delayed to an unspecified date. The gameplay—combining first-person shooter, stealth, and role-playing elements—features exploration and combat in environments connected to multiple city-based levels, with quests that can be completed in a number of ways and character customization based around cybernetic enhancements. Conversations between characters feature a variety of responses, with choices at key story points affecting how some events play out. A post-release patch incorporated deathmatch-style multiplayer.

Deus Ex is set in 2052, in a dystopian cyberpunk future beset by terrorist acts, economic inequality, and a plague dubbed the Gray Death. The player character, the cybernetically enhanced JC Denton, is an anti-terrorism agent who is deployed when a terrorist group interrupts supplies of a rare Gray Death vaccine. Investigating the incident, Denton ends up involved in a struggle between multiple factions for control of the world. The story is inspired by popular conspiracy theory motifs, incorporating groups including the Illuminati and Majestic 12.

The game was created by Warren Spector, who acted as director and producer, and put together a design concept during the early 1990s under the title "Troubleshooter". After being approached by Ion Storm about creating a project with complete creative freedom, Spector began pre-production in 1997. Staff included lead designer Harvey Smith, lead writer Sheldon Pacotti, and lead composer Alexander Brandon. The game was built using the Unreal Engine, which led to issues with coding and non-playable character behavior. Due to technical and time limitations, some planned features and areas had to be downscaled or cut entirely.

Upon release, Deus Ex was a commercial success, selling one million copies worldwide. It saw critical acclaim from game journalists for its design and freedom of player choice. Its graphics saw more mixed reactions, and the voice acting was faulted. The PlayStation 2 port saw mixed reactions, but many praised its adaptation of the game's mechanics to console. It won multiple gaming awards, has been ranked among the best video games of all time, and fostered an active fan community. It has also been cited as a prominent example of the "immersive sim" genre. Deus Ex was expanded into a series of the same name, beginning with the 2003 sequel Deus Ex: Invisible War.

== Gameplay ==
Players are given multiple ways to traverse obstacles, from lockpicking to armed combat.

Deus Ex is an action role-playing game with incorporated first-person shooter and stealth mechanics. Players take on the role of JC Denton, a man equipped with nanotechnology-based cybernetic enhancements called augmentations. At the game's opening the player chooses a combat difficulty−"Easy", "Medium", "Hard", or "Realistic"−and customize Denton's real name, visual appearance, and starting skills. The player moves around the environment, being able to climb ladders and jump onto crates, swim through bodies of water, and crouch to negotiate narrow spaces. The environment also has interactable objects such as computers and keypads, and certain objects in the game can be carried or thrown, from small items like boxes to human bodies.

Each hub area of the game has a variety of missions given to the player by non-playable characters (NPCs), which the player can choose to accept or ignore; these missions include quests linked to the main story and side quests unique to each hub area. These objectives can be completed in a variety of ways; these include using stealth to infiltrate an area, opening access points using hacking, launching an armed assault, or a combination of different tactics. When talking with NPCs, the player has access to multiple dialogue options, with the option chosen influencing the course of the conversation. Short messages are also given which direct the player towards different objectives.

There are a variety of melee and ranged weapons in the game, both lethal and non-lethal; ranged weapons can be upgraded using kits found during gameplay. Items, weapons, ammunition, and equipment can be purchased with credits, the in-game currency either gathered in the environment or earned through quests, or found during exploration. Items that can be picked up include weapon ammunition, health restoratives, and tools for bypassing barriers; lockpicks for mechanical locks, and multitools for electronic devices. The player's health is divided between multiple body parts, each requiring healing with items or at healing stations. Inventory space is limited, with items and weapons taking up varying amounts of space.

Denton's abilities can be enhanced over the course of the game. Skill points earned by completing quests can be spent on the eleven skill types; computers, electronics, the environment, lockpicking, medicine, swimming and five weapon proficiencies. For instance, raising environment proficiency allows for higher jumps and more resistance to hostile environmental effects. During character creation skill points can be reassigned from one skill to another, but after this point skill increases are permanent. Additionally, augmentation canisters can be found or bought throughout the game. Denton starts with three augmentations; the story-based infolink communicator, a light, and a tool for identifying hostiles. Other augmentations, such as increased movement speed, can be unlocked and upgraded using canisters a maximum of four times. One body area can only have one augmentation installed, and they are permanent. Using an augmentation costs energy, which is restored using consumable biocells.

A post-release patch added a multiplayer option. Set across different large levels pulled from different areas of the game, multiplayer was limited to "deathmatch" and "team deathmatch" modes, where players fought to the death either individually or as allied groups. Spawn points provided players with tools and equipment to navigate the level and fight other players, although there were a stricter inventory limit. Unless specified by the match host, players only receive augmentation canisters based on their kills, and must still between different upgrades. The multiplayer mode's servers shut down in April 2014.

== Synopsis ==
=== Setting and characters ===
Deus Ex takes place in the year 2052 in a dystopian cyberpunk future on the brink of social and economic collapse, where multiple conspiracy theories and organizations are real. The two main factions in-game are the Illuminati, portrayed as an ancient secret society controlling civilization from the shadows, and Majestic 12, once subordinate to the Illuminati and now a splinter group. During the events of Deus Ex, the world is being ravaged by a plague dubbed the Gray Death, with supplies of its Ambrosia vaccine limited. The game takes place across multiple locations including multiple parts of the United States (New York City, California, Nevada), Hong Kong, and Paris. A recurring location is Liberty Island, which houses an operating base for the United Nations Anti-Terrorist Coalition (UNATCO). UNATCO's main conflict is with the National Secessionist Force (NSF), a terrorist group targeting Ambrosia shipments. Another feature of the world is "augmentations", artificial enhancements using mechanics and nanotechnology.

The main protagonist is JC Denton, an agent for UNATCO who has received advanced nanotechnology; he works at UNATCO with his brother Paul Denton, who shares the same nanotech augmentations, under the command of Joseph Manderley. Other important characters are Tracer Tong, a hacker allied with the Triads of Hong Kong; Morgan Everett, a high-ranking Illuminati member; Daedalus, an artificial intelligence construct and its successor Icarus; Walton Simons, newly appointed Administrator of the Federal Emergency Management Agency (FEMA); and Bob Page, a corporate CEO and current leader of Majestic 12.

=== Plot ===
Note: While the general plot of Deus Ex follows a distinct path, many elements are subject to the player's decisions. The game also offers subplots that the player may or may not encounter, depending on their actions within the game. This synopsis concentrates on the main, unavoidable plot thread of the game.

JC Denton is brought straight from training when the NSF attack Liberty Island. While he defeats them, a shipment of Ambrosia is stolen and taken to New York. JC takes on multiple missions tracking the NSF and the Ambrosia shipment, eventually finding out that Paul has defected to the NSF, acting as a mole within UNATCO after learning the Gray Death was a man-made disease used for power and population control. As punishment for his defection, Simons takes control and activates a kill switch, giving Paul just 24 hours left alive. Ordered by Manderley to eliminate Tracer Tong in Hong Kong, JC instead finds Paul's hideout in New York, learning more details about UNATCO's operations but prompting his employers to attack him. JC's kill switch is also activated, and Paul can either escape or be killed by Simons' agents.

JC is taken to a Majestic 12 prison beneath UNATCO, but escapes with help from "Daedalus", initially assumed to be a hacker. JC travels to Hong Kong and finds Tong, getting help removing the kill switch in exchange for resolving a war between the Triads. Tong identifies the virus as created by VersaLife, Page's company and a former Illuminati asset. Destroying the universal constructor creating the virus and stealing the Ambrosia plans, JC is then sent by Tong to the Illuminati's remaining base in Paris. JC finds Morgan Everett, who explains the Gray Death was intended as an aid to augmentation, but was stolen and repurposed by Page and Simons. To stop Page from producing more Gray Death, JC agrees to defend against Simons's assault on Vandenberg Air Force Base, where a group of Majestic 12 defectors are hiding with a second universal constructor.

JC learns from the Vandenberg scientists that Daedalus is an AI currently allied with Everett. When Everett attempts to defeat Majestic 12 using Daedalus, Page counters with his successor AI Icarus. The process causes Daedalus and Icarus to merge into a new entity "Helios", which seizes control of worldwide communication. JC must then travel to Area 51, where Page is in the process of merging with Helios to gain global power. JC is then given three options for defeating Page and resolving the situation. Tong wants the base destroyed, bringing down the world's communication network and triggering a "Dark Age" of free city states, Everett wants to preserve the technology and re-establish the Illuminati as the world's controllers, and Helios seeks to merge with JC and become a benevolent dictator.

== Development ==
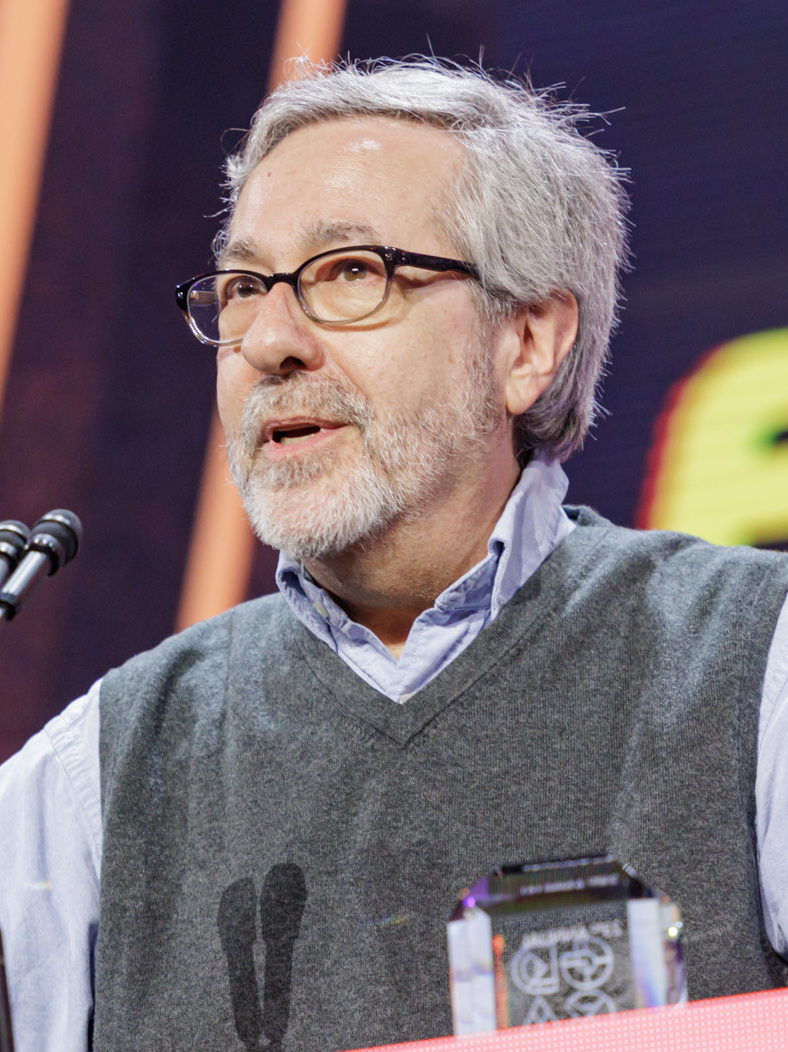
Warren Spector

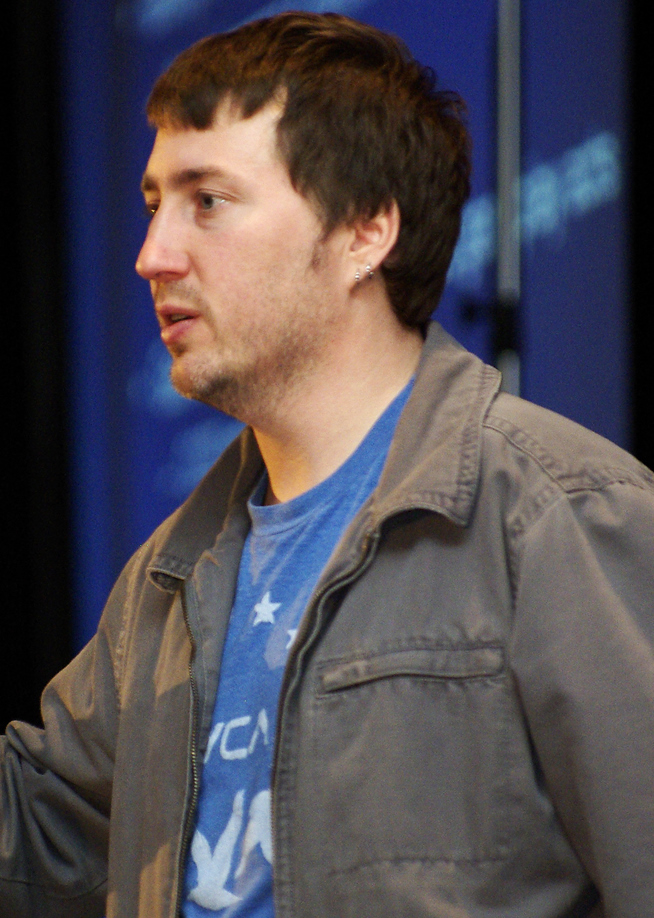
Harvey Smith

Spector created the original concept for Deus Ex and acted as producer and director; Smith was lead designer.

The concept for Deus Ex was created by Warren Spector, who first started writing its design document while working on Ultima Underworld II: Labyrinth of Worlds (1993). Initially titled "Troubleshooter", it laid out the basic gameplay ideas and real-world based setting. While he pitched the game concept to both Origin Systems and Looking Glass Studios, the pitch was turned down due to its ambitious nature, technical constraints of the time, and lack of interest from senior staff. Another game where he attempted these concepts, titled Junction Point, was cancelled mid-production. During his work on System Shock (1994) and the project which became Thief: The Dark Project (1998), Spector became frustrated at creative limitations placed on him, and due to financial troubles Looking Glass Studio closed down their Austin branch where Spector worked. He was invited to join the newly founded Ion Storm by co-founder John Romero, who offered Spector complete creative freedom on his next project. Spector eventually agreed and led the creation of Ion Storm's Austin studio where Deus Ex would be developed.

Publisher Eidos Interactive's former executive chairman Ian Livingstone described their decision to back Deus Ex as part of a strategy to broaden the company's portfolio away from Tomb Raider. He felt Eidos were right to back the concept due to Spector's skills and ambition. Pre-production began in August 1997 under the working title Shooter: Majestic Revelations. Spector led the game's team as producer and lead director. During the early stages he both helped run the new studio, and hired staff for the game. Team members included lead designer Harvey Smith, with whom Spector had worked at Looking Glass Studios, Chris Norden as lead programmer and assistant director, and level designer Steve Powers. The team eventually expanded to twenty people, split between two design teams and an art team led by Jay Lee. Development spanned a six-month pre-production period with a team of six, and twenty-eight months of full production with a staff of twenty. The game was declared gold (indicating that it was being prepared for duplication and release) in June 2000.

=== Game design ===
The original design document cited the gameplay inspirations as Half-Life, Fallout, Thief: The Dark Project, and GoldenEye 007; the game as a whole was meant to be "genre-busting" with combined elements of role-playing, first-person shooter, adventure and stealth. Spector later cited the limited choices available in the first Suikoden game as an inspiration for the broad range of story and gameplay options in Deus Ex. Spector's aim with the gameplay was to allow as much player freedom as possible; his design document and personal goals included "problems, not puzzles", "no forced failure", "players do; NPCs watch", and "areas with multiple entrance and exit points". These early designs underwent extensive expansions and alterations during early production. An early commitment was making level areas open-ended, with multiple ways to resolve gameplay and story situations. The opening "Liberty Island" was designed as a vertical slice, showing off the various gameplay elements the team wanted to implement overall. There were some limitations put in place such as restricting what and how many augmentations the player could have access to, which Spector explained as promoting variety between players. Following early negative feedback from an industry demo with several prominent designers including Doug Church and Gabe Newell, the augmentation gameplay was reworked to incorporate the limited energy mechanic.

The team opted to license a third-party engine for the game rather than building their own, which ultimately gave more time for story and gameplay development. Once pre-production was completed, the team settled on the Unreal Engine as it would cover most of what they wanted to do from a design perspective, and was easy for their programmers to handle. As the Unreal Engine was designed for first-person shooters, the RPG mechanics such as leveling and inventory were added by the developers, alongside additional graphical elements like lip syncing for dialogue. Programmer Scott Martin implemented a wide range of new NPC behavior including patrols, idling, and sitting down. During early testing the enemy reactions were so acute that Martin had to adjust their behavior and detection protocols to be more forgiving. The AI coding caused problems until late into development, with the team building on Unreal Engine's existing code and causing unpredictable NPC behavior as a result. Church provided help with some of the AI programming.

Spector described the early high-concept work on the game as the smoothest period, with later production running into repeated issues. The game's scale and conflicting suggestions from playtesters began causing problems for the team. There were also conflicts between Smith and Robert White, who both wanted to lead the gameplay design, so Spector split duties. Smith was given control of the simulation elements, while White was put in charge of the role-playing elements. The production milestones necessitated trimming or altering features; Spector recalled Smith using the phrase "Less is more" in reference to these elements. The conflicts between the two design teams were described by Spector as "a bunch of knock-down drag-out fights". The team's morale also suffered due to negative press surrounding Ion Storm from the Dallas studio; these included controversies surrounding Daikatana (2000), and the troubled production of Anachronox (2001). The Austin team adopted what Spector described as an unhelpful "'we'll show them' mentality", determined to distinguish their work from the Dallas studio.

Planned environments needed to be scaled down due to technical issues that were appearing in early demo builds. Some content was cut entirely including a female option for JC Denton, and stages set in the White House, Russia, and on board a space station. Finished elements from those cut sections were incorporated into the final story and levels. The feature Spector most regretting dropping was plans for multiplayer that would have featured at release, describing the other dropped content as "just kind of stupid stuff". By contrast, Martin was upset that those sections had to be cut, but understood they had to release the game due to troubles with Ion Storm's other titles. Spector later commented that all aspects of the game's systems, except for the inventory management and NPC conversations, were redesigned in some form during production.

=== Scenario ===
The storyline drew from multiple sources, including The X-Files, Colossus: The Forbin Project, The Manchurian Candidate, RoboCop, and Men in Black. Inspired by his wife's liking for The X-Files, Spector connected the "real world, millennial weirdness, [and] conspiracy" topics to appeal to a broad audience; Spector later stated the team's extensive research into conspiracies to reference in-game helped them understand how conspiracy theorists thought. The approach towards a player-driven storyline was inspired by a Dungeons & Dragons session he was part of in 1978 with science fiction author Bruce Sterling, one of the credited originators of the cyberpunk genre. During the session a story naturally emerged within the setting Sterling created, and Spector wanted to recapture that feeling. The more grounded world design, defined as a "real-world roleplaying game", was a direct reaction to his fatigue with the sci-fi and fantasy worlds he had worked with on earlier projects.

While the initial story plan was described as similar to The X-Files, Spector felt the final product was close in tone to James Bond. The story changed a lot during production, with supporting characters and antagonists changing a lot and the narrative being streamlined at the suggestion of staff members including Smith, but JC Denton's presence and role as a government agent remained consistent. The game's content, which included terrorism and cybernetically-enhanced soldiers, was also directly inspired by news stories that were starting to appear regularly in 1997. Some of the plot's references were described as being "literally ripped from the headlines" such as references to the Trilateral Commission and modern protest groups. Spector later felt uncomfortable with how some in-game events unintentionally mirrored later real-life developments such as the September 11 attacks.

The script was principally written by Sheldon Pacotti. Additional material was written by Chris Todd and Austin Grossman; Grossman focused on small verbal "barks" and rewriting conversations where needed, while Todd wrote in-game texts and the opening and ending cutscenes. When Pacotti joined in 1999, all the characters had names and detailed backstories, with the main job being implementing the plans of Spector and Smith into the finished game. The pre-release script was very large, and the writing team were working constantly on it for six months. Smith took the large draft script and trimmed it down, while designer Albert Yarusso created a dialogue management system. The writing team were reading several books covering popular conspiracy theories of the time, and Grossman attributed the political elements to Spector and Pacotti. After Pacotti was hired, the story's tone shifted sharply towards the "conspiracy and socialist angle". Pacotti enjoyed working on the story, writing for it constantly after being impressed by seeing Spector's playthrough of an early game. In hindsight, Grossman felt embarrassed by some of the character stereotypes they used for NPCs in Paris and Hong Kong.

The original design document had "dozens" of character concepts that survived into the final game, but had to be changed to fit design constraints. While Spector's original design only featured human enemies, his team persuaded him to add in robots and non-human enemies based on the game's lore, something he felt benefited the final product. Due to how characters such as Paul could die, they could not be full incorporated into the second half of the game's story, but scenes related to them were put in place later in development to resolve their plot lines if they survived. These insertions were decided a meeting between Smith, Church and the script writers. Some of the uneven character representation was explained as being due to focusing on gameplay over story, with their additions being last-minute inclusions. The endings were designed as isolated late-game choices independent from previous decisions made during within the game. Smith explained the decision as a way not to "trap" players into a particular route based on earlier decisions they might not understand. Plans for an ending following on from the player either dying to or siding with Page were dropped due to time constraints.

=== Audio ===
The music of Deus Ex was handled by members of Straylight Productions, a music group who had notably worked on the Unreal series. The main composer was Alexander Brandon, with additional work by Dan Gardopée, Michiel van den Bos and Reeves Gabrels. Gabrels' contributions were the club songs for New York, Paris and Hong Kong. Speaking in 2007, Brandon remembered Deus Ex as his favorite project due to positive feedback from players. As with their earlier projects, the music used the MOD module file format. The main theme was based on an unused music track created by Brandon for a cancelled Unreal project. Deus Ex was Brandon's last game as a member of Straylight, as he moved to Ion Storm as head of their audio department.

Speaking about the voice acting, Brandon described it as "really cheesy" but effective due to it communicating the different characters' personalities quickly. Both JC and Paul Denton were voiced by Jay Anthony Franke, an aspiring voice actor who was working in quality assurance (QA) at Ion Storm at the time. Franke estimated his lines totaled between 11,000 and 14,000 words. As he was also a QA tester for the game, his lines were added in very late by the sound team so he would not have to listen to himself during testing. Spector estimated that the game had around 150,000 lines of voiced dialogue, which was localized into European languages for its release in those regions.

== Release ==
During production, the game was originally planned for a release around Christmas 1998, but was repeatedly pushed back due to production problems. By mid-1998, the title had become Deus Ex, taken from the phrase "deus ex machina" originating in ancient theater and typically meaning an unexpected person or figure resolving a situation without warning. Spector described the title as a multilayered wordplay on the story's themes, the difficulties of game plots, the concept of a computer game, and a "self-referential" acceptance of trying one's best to resolve affairs. The game was shown off at the 1998 European Computer Trade Show, and first previewed at E3 1999. As part of the marketing, the team created an authentic-looking website for UNATCO and linked it to pre-existing government websites; excessive traffic from the UNATCO page caused one of those websites to crash, prompting a call from that agency's lawyers.

Eidos Interactive published Deus Ex for Microsoft Windows in 2000, with the final release date varying based on location: June 23 in North America, July 27 in Australia, and August 4 in the United Kingdom. The game was supported after release with software patches to resolve framerate issues with Direct3D, and introduce multiplayer mode. A Game of the Year edition was released on May 8, 2001, incorporating the additions and including a soundtrack CD. The Game of the Year edition was released through Steam on March 29, 2007.

Versions for Mac OS and Linux operating systems were being planned during the game's production. The Mac OS port was in development at Westlake Interactive prior to the PC version's release. The Mac OS port was published in North America by Aspyr on July 13, 2000, and was patched to fix technical issues and introduce multiplayer. A Linux port was in development at Loki Games before the company closed down in 2002.

=== Deus Ex: The Conspiracy ===
A port of the game for PlayStation 2 (PS2), titled Deus Ex: The Conspiracy outside Europe, was published by Eidos Interactive in 2002; it released in North America on March 26, in Europe on June 7, and in Australia on December 13. It was re-released as a Premium exclusive on the PlayStation+ service on June 17, 2025. The port was developed in-house by Ion Storm with a team of fourteen people, many drawn from the original team. Spector described the largest issue with the port being the PS2's limited memory space, since Spector wanted the game ported over with as much content intact as possible. As part of porting, the level maps were streamlined or re-arranged, the difficulty and augmentation mechanics were rebalanced, and the interface had to be fully redesigned to be understandable and easily usable for console users.

The initial design document as described by the port's producer Bill Money called for the levels to be redesigned with ending boss fights, which caused him to "flip". While the original character models used a mesh-based design, the PS2 version was updated to a skeletal model for more realistic movement. Motion capture was also added for male and female models. The release was delayed by a couple of months due to the need for optimisation to decrease load times and the burden on console memory. The frame rate issues required a lot of the game's code to be moved from the Unreal-native environment into C++ format.

=== Mods ===
The software development kit (SDK) for Deus Ex was released on September 22, 2000, and shortly thereafter, fans of the game began to create mods. In a press release related to the patch, Spector and other team members stated they were eager to see what the modding community would make. Notable mods include The Nameless Mod (TNM), a "total conversion" released in 2009; Deus Ex: Revision, a publisher-endorsed mod released in 2015 that overhauled the game's graphics, gameplay and soundtrack; and The Lay D Denton Project, a 2021 release which restores a female JC Denton with new voice acting and adjustments to existing voice lines to account for the gender change.

=== Deus Ex: Remastered ===
A modern remaster of the game, Deus Ex: Remastered, was announced during the September 2025 State of Play broadcast. It was scheduled for release on February 5, 2026, for PlayStation 5, Xbox Series X/S, Windows and Nintendo Switch before being delayed to an unspecified date due to fan backlash. The remaster is being co-developed by Eidos-Montréal and Aspyr, and published by Aspyr. It includes updated graphics, adjustments to the gameplay including autosave, and controller support inspired by later Deus Ex titles.

Audience response to the remaster's announcement trailer was negative, with users criticizing the updated graphics—some comparing the visuals to Grand Theft Auto: The Trilogy – The Definitive Edition—and opining that the remastering was inferior to available user mods. PC Gamer called the remaster's graphics "bafflingly shiny, alarmingly bulbous, [and] strangely smooth". Destructoid said, "The looks of the Deus Ex remaster are a trifecta of failure. They don't stay faithful to the original, and don't make it look just “a bit more modern”. This remaster looks like something they'd be making nowadays if gamers had really enjoyed the shiny, rubbery texture of that weird period during the PS3 and Xbox 360 era." Kotaku commented that the "newer, higher-resolution assets [...] didn't mesh well with the old models and geometry that was still left in the game, creating a bizarre effect where it looked even worse than the chunky but charming visuals of the original game." Rock, Paper, Shotgun, TheGamer, and GameRant also reported that the remaster's system requirements were too high considering the quality of the new graphics.

In response to the negative feedback, Aspyr announced that the remaster would no longer be released in February 2026, and all preorders would be refunded.

== Reception ==
=== Sales ===
According to Computer Gaming World's Stefan Janicki, Deus Ex had "sold well in North America" by early 2001 with regular placement in top ten best-selling lists for several weeks, and showed even better performance in Europe with similar sales position throughout the summer of 2000. The game achieved sales of 138,840 copies and revenues of $5 million in the United States by the end of 2000, according to PC Data. It received a "Silver" award from the Entertainment and Leisure Software Publishers Association (ELSPA) in February 2002, indicating lifetime sales of at least 100,000 units in the United Kingdom. The ELSPA later raised it to "Gold" status, for 200,000 sales. As of April 2009, Deus Ex has sold over 1 million copies worldwide.

=== Critical response ===
Reception

Aggregate score
Aggregator	Score	
Aggregator	PC	PS2
Metacritic	90/100	81/100

Review scores
Publication	Score	
Publication	PC	PS2
Edge	9/10	
Eurogamer	10/10	
Game Informer		9/10
GamePro	5/5	5/5
GameSpot	8.2/10	8.1/10
GameSpy	88/100	83/100
IGN	9.4/10	6.3/10
Next Generation	5/5	
Official U.S. PlayStation Magazine		4.5/5
PC Gamer (UK)	95/100	

Deus Ex met with very positive reception, with review aggregation website Metacritic giving it a score of 90 out of 100 based on 28 critic reviews. Across multiple reviews, the gameplay variety and amount of player freedom met with general praise. The graphics and audio saw more mixed reactions.

Jeff Lundrigan of Next Generation lauded the title as one of the best PC titles available due to the breadth of its gameplay options. Kieron Gillen of PC Gamer UK focused on gameplay in his review, highlighting the freedom of choice with approaches and depth of its systems. The reviewer for Edge similarly praised the amount of choices offered to players and the depth of customization through the skill and augmentation systems. Rob Fahay of Eurogamer was pleased with the amount of ways he could approach and solve a problem, and that unconventional solutions did not break the game. GamePro's Chris Patterson had similar sentiments towards the gameplay and number of approaches given to players during missions. Tal Blevins of IGN praised both the depth of gameplay options, and the strong level design, feeling that each complemented the other and that no two playthroughs would be the same. GameSpot's Greg Kasavin similarly praised the variety of approaches available in missions, but faulted the individual parts of gameplay like combat and hacking for a lack of depth. GameSpy's Gino Gard lauded the gameplay's core design, but noted erratic behavior in enemy AI.

Gard praised the graphics and environment design without details, and Patterson described it as one of the better-looking Unreal-powered games available. Edge enjoyed the game's visual design, putting a lot of its charm down to good level design. Kasavin was less positive about the graphics, mostly blaming low lighting levels, and further noted some space and technical issues. Blevin noted the graphics as one of the game's weak points, faulting the stiff character movement and graphical issues that appeared during gameplay. Lundrigan similarly noted stiff character animations, but otherwise praised the graphics as complementing the urban environment design. There was a recurring concern about the game's high graphical requirements.

Patterson positively noted the sound design, but felt the voice acting was "a mixed bag", praising supporting characters while faulting NPC accents used in the Paris and Hong Kong sections. Kasavin described the soundtrack as engaging but forgettable, and summed up the voice acting as "mediocre or at best inconsistent". Fahay praised the voice work as good by video game standards, Lundrigan noted the voice acting let down the writing, while Edge summed up the voice acting as "appalling".

Blevins summed up the story as "one of the finest crafted in any game", comparing it positively to a season of The X-Files in game form. Gillen described the story as having satisfying and optional depth, and praised the lack of traditional cutscenes. Kasavin enjoyed the overarching narrative, but faulted a lack of character development as they undermined later plot twists. Lundrigan enjoyed the writing and found it "remarkably fluid" in its detail variations, while Fahay summed up the story as "highly derivative". Edge enjoyed the opening premise, but criticized the use of "third-rate sci-fi nonsense" by its conclusion.

The PS2 port also saw positive reviews from critics, earning a score of 81 out of 100 Metacritic based on 25 reviews. Several reviewers described it as a good port. John Davison, writing for Official U.S. PlayStation Magazine, was impressed by how well the PC original's mechanics and depth had been adapted for a console game experience. Justin Leeper of Game Informer was generally positive about the game, but faulted the graphics as low quality for the time. In a second opinion, Matthew Kato praised the adaptation of the PC original's controls to the PS2's DualShock controller, but faulted the lack of improvements to environments and AI behavior. GameSpy's Christopher Buecheler positively noted new character models and accurate gameplay adaptation from PC, but noted some frame rate drops and felt the graphics looked poor compared to other PS2 games of the time. GamePro gave high praise to the control conversion with both movement and inventory management, but noted long load times between areas. Kasavin similarly faulted the long load times when going between different areas. IGN's David Smith was far less positive, praising the pre-established gameplay elements and sound design, but faulting its redone controls and lack of graphical upgrades.

=== Awards ===
List of awards and nominations
Year	Award	Category	Recipient	Result	Ref.
2001	Game Developers Choice Awards	Excellence in Game Design	Harvey Smith, Warren Spector	Won	
2001	Game Developers Choice Awards	Game Innovation Spotlight	Deus Ex	Won	
2001	Game Developers Choice Awards	Game of the Year	Deus Ex	Nominated	
2001	4th Annual Interactive Achievement Awards	Computer Innovation	Deus Ex	Won	
2001	4th Annual Interactive Achievement Awards	PC Action/Adventure	Deus Ex	Won	
2001	4th Annual Interactive Achievement Awards	Game of the Year	Deus Ex	Nominated	
2001	4th Annual Interactive Achievement Awards	PC Game of the Year	Deus Ex	Nominated	
2001	4th Annual Interactive Achievement Awards	PC Role-Playing	Deus Ex	Nominated	
2001	4th Annual Interactive Achievement Awards	Sound Design	Deus Ex	Nominated	
2001	British Academy of Film and Television Arts	PC Game of the Year	Deus Ex	Won	

== Legacy ==
According to Spector, Deus Ex received over thirty "Best of" awards from various outlets during 2001, something of which he remains proud. The game has also ranked high in lists of the best video games of all time compiled by various publications. 1UP.com listed it as one of the most important games of all time, calling its influence "too massive to properly gauge". Several articles and retrospectives have cited Deus Ex as a prominent example of the "immersive sim", a type of video game that promotes realism and freedom of player choice. A movie adaptation was also licensed by Columbia Pictures in 2002.

Speaking in 2015, Spector recalled that he never expected the game to sell well, but was pleased it gained a strong cult following and continued to receive fan letters about it. Several former staff workers including Smith, Paccotti, and others associated with Ion Storm recall their time with the game fondly as both a team effort and an informative experience.

=== Future games ===
A sequel to Deus Ex was announced in 2001, with Ion Storm and Eidos Interactive returning as developer and publisher respectively; the next game was designed as a console-focused release. Many of the original staff returned, with Smith acting as director, and Pacotti and Brandon returning as lead writer and composer. Titled Deus Ex: Invisible War, the game released in 2003 for Windows and the original Xbox. Ion Storm made multiple attempts to create a third Deus Ex title before closing in 2005. The Deus Ex series was revived at new developer Eidos-Montréal, which would go on to develop or supervise multiple titles beginning with the prequel Human Revolution (2011).

== See also ==
- 2000 in video games
- List of role-playing video games: 2000 to 2001
- Metal Gear Solid (1998 video game)
