= Queen of the Damned (soundtrack) =

Soundtrack album by various artists
- Released: February 19, 2002
- Recorded: 2000–2001
- Genre: Nu metal
- Length: 59:58
- Label: Warner Music Group
- Producers: Richard Gibbs, Jonathan Davis

Professional ratings
Review scores
Source	Rating
AllMusic	3/5 stars

Queen of the Damned: Music from the Motion Picture is the official soundtrack for the 2002 vampire film Queen of the Damned based on the Anne Rice novel of the same name. It released on February 19, 2002 via Warner Music Group and was produced by Richard Gibbs and Jonathan Davis of American nu metal band Korn. Frank Fitzpatrick and Rich Dickerson served as the music supervisors for the album.

== History ==
The original motion picture soundtrack for the film was Jonathan Davis' first musical project outside of his band, Korn. Originally, he was supposed to perform vocals on the soundtrack, but due to limitations in his record label contract with Sony, prohibiting his voice to appear on disc, he could not. Jeff Scott Soto was subsequently hired to do the vocal work, but didn't make the final cut either. Instead, five of Jon's friends from other bands were chosen, including Wayne Static of Static-X, David Draiman of Disturbed, Chester Bennington of Linkin Park, Marilyn Manson, and Jay Gordon of Orgy. Head and Munky from Korn, Sam Rivers of Limp Bizkit, L. Shankar, Vinnie Colaiuta and Terry Bozzio rounded out the studio musicians.

== Track listing ==
No.	Title	Writer(s)	Performer(s)	Length
1.	"Not Meant for Me"	Jonathan Davis; Richard Gibbs	Wayne Static of Static-X	4:09
2.	"Forsaken"	Davis; Gibbs	David Draiman of Disturbed	3:39
3.	"System"	Davis; Gibbs	Chester Bennington of Linkin Park	5:03
4.	"Change (In the House of Flies)"	Camillo Moreno; Chi Cheng; Abe Cunningham; Stephen Carpenter	Deftones	4:59
5.	"Redeemer"	Davis; Gibbs	Marilyn Manson	4:19
6.	"Dead Cell"	Papa Roach	Papa Roach	3:07
7.	"Penetrate"	Jason Miller; Ullrich Hepperlin	Godhead	4:18
8.	"Slept So Long"	Davis; Gibbs	Jay Gordon of Orgy	5:29
9.	"Down with the Sickness"	Mike Wengren; Dan Donegan; David Draiman; Steve Kmak	Disturbed	4:39
10.	"Cold"	Wayne Wells; Ken Lacey; Antonio Campos	Static-X	2:58
11.	"Headstrong"	William Martin; Scott Kohler; Guy Couturier; Todd Wyatt	Earshot	4:55
12.	"Body Crumbles"	Jeff Gutt; Judd Gruenbaum; Brandon Brown; Dan Hartwell; Jeff Blue	Dry Cell	3:07
13.	"Excess"	Adrian Thaws	Tricky	4:43
14.	"Beføre I'm Dead"	Free Dominguez; Bruce M. Somers	Kidneythieves	4:36
Total length:				59:58

== Other songs ==
=== Jonathan Davis ===
- "Careless (Akasha's Lament)" – 3:39

This song was omitted from the soundtrack album, however Jonathan Davis released it in downloadable form via Amazon and iTunes on November 16, 2007. It is also available on the live album Alone I Play.

Five additional songs, all written and performed by Jonathan Davis, were recorded (as shown in the credits of the movie Queen of the Damned) but did not make it on the official soundtrack. The songs were subsequently performed by other artists as shown on the official track listing. Davis's versions were eventually released as bonus material on the DVD and Blu-ray versions of the movie, including music videos.

- "Forsaken" – 3:39
- "Redeemer" – 3:45
- "System" – 4:44
- "Slept So Long" – 4:22
- "Not Meant for Me" – 2:42

Richard Gibbs has confirmed that there are two more songs that Jonathan Davis wrote, but it is unlikely that they will be released.

=== Aaliyah ===
Late actress and R&B singer Aaliyah, who played Akasha in the movie, was not featured on the soundtrack. Before her death, Davis and Aaliyah had planned to record a duet.

== Personnel ==
- Terry Bozzio – drums (8)
- Vinnie Colaiuta – drums (2, 3, 5, 8)
- Jonathan Davis – guitar (1, 3), bass (1, 3), keyboards (1–3, 5, 8)
- Jason Frederick – bass (8)
- Richard "Hard" Gibbs – keyboards (1–3, 5, 8)
- Sam Rivers – bass (2, 5)
- James "Munky" Shaffer – guitar (2, 5, 8)
- Shankar – double violin (2, 8), vocal improvisation (2)
- Brian "Head" Welch – guitar (2, 5, 8)

== Charts ==
=== Weekly charts ===
Weekly chart performance for Queen of the Damned: Music from the Motion Picture
Chart (2002)	Peak position
UK Compilation Albums (OCC)	59
UK Soundtrack Albums (OCC)	7
UK Rock & Metal Albums (OCC)	6

=== Year-end charts ===
Year-end chart performance for Queen of the Damned: Music from the Motion Picture
Chart (2002)	Position
Canadian Alternative Albums (Billboard)	91
Canadian Metal Albums (Billboard)	43

== Certifications ==
Certifications for Queen of the Damned: Music from the Motion Picture
Region	Certification	Certified units/sales
United States (RIAA)	Gold	500,000^{^}
^{^} Shipments figures based on certification alone.
