= Zerøspace =

Studio album by Kidneythieves
- Released: March 26, 2002
- Genres: Industrial rock; industrial metal
- Length: 60:40
- Label: Extasy International
- Producer: Bruce Somers

Kidneythieves chronology
Phi in the Sky (2001)	Zerøspace (2002)	Trickstereprocess (2004)

Professional ratings
Review scores
Source	Rating
AllMusic	4/5 stars
PopMatters	(positive)

Zerøspace is the second album from the band Kidneythieves, released on March 26, 2002. It includes a slightly reworked version of their 1998 cover of Patsy Cline's "Crazy" which originally appeared on the Bride of Chucky soundtrack.

"Beføre I'm Dead" is featured on the soundtrack of the 2002 film, Queen of the Damned.

== Track listing ==
All songs written by Kidneythieves, except where noted

1. Beføre I'm Dead – 4:36
2. Zerøspace – 3:50
3. Arsenal – 5:14
4. Mølten – 0:51
5. Black Bullet – 4:08
6. Dyskrasia – 4:21
7. Spank – 4:20
8. Glitter Girl – 4:15
9. Serene Dream – 3:36
10. Amnzerø – 2:07
11. Crazy – 3:18
12. Placebø – 6:39
13. Take a Train [Awakening] – 2:21

== Personnel ==
- Executive Producer – Yoshiki
