= Trypt0fanatic =

Studio album by Kidneythieves
- Released: July 20, 2010
- Recorded: 2007–2010
- Genre: Industrial rock
- Length: 38:00

Kidneythieves chronology
Trickstereprocess (2004)	Trypt0fanatic (2010)	The Mend (2016)

Trypt0fanatic is the third album from the Kidneythieves, released on July 20, 2010. The physical CD is only being distributed independently through the band's official website. There have been 5 bonus tracks digitally released only during 2010–2011. These include "Light Deceiver" (originally a free pre-order), "Tears On A Page [Live Acoustic]", Jude (Be Somebody) [Acoustic], and 2 remixes of "Lick U Clean", one by Beat Ventriloquists (included when you purchase a selected Tee or Tank from the KT Store), and the other by KMFDM.

== Track listing ==
1. Jude (Be Somebody) - 3:17
2. Beg - 3:38
3. Freeky People - 3:42
4. Velveteen - 4:05
5. Dead Girl Walking - 4:04
6. Size of Always - 3:41
7. Comets + Violins - 3:34
8. Lick U Clean - 3:43
9. Dark Horse - 3:31
10. Tears on a Page - 4:18

=== Bonus tracks ===
11. Light Deceiver - 4:39 Download Only
12. Tears on a Page (Live Acoustic) - 5:35 Download Only
