= Kidneythieves =

American industrial rock band

- Origin: Los Angeles, California, U.S.
- Genres: Industrial rock
- Years active: 1997–2004; 2007–present
- Labels: Push; Extasy; Warner Bros.; Red Sleeve Music
- Members: Free Dominguez; Bruce Somers
- Website: www.kidneythieves.com

Kidneythieves is an American industrial rock duo from Los Angeles, California. It was founded in 1997 by vocalist Free Dominguez and guitarist/engineer Bruce Somers, and throughout their existence have worked with a revolving door of session musicians and live band members. After releasing two albums, Trickster (1998) and Zerøspace (2002), Kidneythieves went on hiatus in late 2004, but regrouped again in late 2007.

== History ==
In 1998, Kidneythieves released their first single, "S+M (A Love Song)," as well as their first album, Trickster. They followed up their initial releases with the remix EP Phi in the Sky in 2001, and their second album Zerøspace in 2002. The album's title track was released as a single. Their song "Before I'm Dead" was featured in the 2002 film Queen of the Damned. In 2004, they re-released Trickster as Trickstereprocess, with digitally remastered tracks, five bonus tracks and a bonus DVD. After the release of Trickstereprocess, Free Dominguez went on to create an indie project while Bruce Somers created the band ShockNina.

In January 2007, Dominguez sent out a newsletter via email stating that she and Somers were collaborating once again on brand new Kidneythieves material. Mid-2010 saw the release of their long-awaited third album, Trypt0fanatic. In 2011 Kidneythieves released a 5-track EP, The Invisible Plan. (Both Trypt0fanatic and The Invisible Plan are only available on CD through the band's official website store, also including a pre-order bonus track for each release).

In December 2015, the band launched a Kickstarter campaign to fund their new album, The Mend, which was released in September 2016.

== Band members ==
Current members

- Free Dominguez – vocals, songwriting (1998–2004, 2007–present)
- Bruce Somers – guitars, programming, production, instruments, songwriting (1998–2004, 2007–present)

Touring members

- Christian Dorris – bass (1998–2004); drums (2007–2008)
- Moni Scaria – guitars (2001–2004, 2007–2009)
- Jon Siren – drums (2008)
- Chris Schleyer – guitars (1998–2001)
- Mirv Douglas – bass (2011–2014)
- Sean Sellers – drums, percussion (1998–2004)

== Discography ==
=== Studio albums ===
- Trickster (1998)
- Zerøspace (2002)
- Trypt0fanatic (2010)
- The Mend (2016)

Remastered albums

- Trickstereprocess (2004)

=== EPs and special editions ===
- Phi in the Sky (2001)
- The Invisible Plan (2011)
- Lick U Clean E4M (2011)

=== Live albums ===
- Kidneythieves Live in Chicago 2002 (2002)

Track Listing

1. Take a Train (Intro)
2. Black Bullet
3. Taxicab Messiah
4. Before I'm Dead
5. Crazy
6. Glitter Girl
7. Zerospace
8. Dyskrasia
9. Before I'm Dead Acoustic
10. Red & Violet

=== Singles ===
- S+M (A Love Song) (1998)
- Zerospace (2002)
- Freeky People (2010)

== Media appearances ==
=== Soundtrack contributions ===
- Bride of Chucky (1998)

- "Crazy" (cover of a Willie Nelson song made popular by Patsy Cline)

- Queen of the Damned (2002)

- "Before I'm Dead"

- Dissidia 012 Final Fantasy (2011)

- "God in Fire"

- Metal Gear Rising: Revengeance (2013)

- "A Stranger I Remain"

=== Television series ===
- First Wave (TV series) (1998)

- "S&M (a Love Song)" in Episode 10, Marker 262

- Wolf Lake (2001)

- "Black Bullet" in Episode 1, Meat the Parents

- CSI: Miami (2003)

- "Arsenal" in Episode 209 (Season 2, Episode 09), Bait

- Warehouse 13 (2010)

- "Taxicab Messiah" in Season 2, Episode 2, Mild Mannered

=== Video games ===
Selected songs from the album Trickster were featured in Deus Ex: Invisible War. They are performed in-game by fictional pop-star "NG Resonance", voiced by the lead vocalist, Free Dominguez.

The band collaborated with Takeharu Ishimoto on the song God in Fire, from the soundtrack to Dissidia 012 Final Fantasy. In 2013, Free Dominguez sang on the soundtrack to Metal Gear Rising: Revengeance on the track A Stranger I Remain (Maniac Agenda Mix).

=== Guest appearances and collaborations ===
Free Dominguez has contributed vocals to the third Conjure One album, Exilarch on the song "Run For Cover", as well as on Beat Ventriloquists EP, Goodnight Memory on the song "Unfolding", and will collaborate with them again on their forthcoming debut album. In 2004, Free's vocals were also featured on a number of songs, including "Geisha Superfly", "War of Love", "Invisible", "Kickstand" & "Rhinestone Halo" which she wrote for "The Insider project", a joint venture project with Matt "Dr." Fink of The Revolution and DJ Insider. Free's backing vocals can be heard on Zeromancer's album, Clone Your Lover on songs "Flirt (with Me)" & "Houses Of Cards". She sang the latter live on stage with Zeromancer in Germany. Free also fronted for Conjure One in Germany around the same time, then performed again with them in London shortly afterwards. (May 2010). Free Dominguez was featured on KMFDM's 2011 album, WTF?!, on the song, "Take It Like A Man". Aside from collaborations, Free has released solo material, the first being her debut album, "freedoming", which is currently Sold Out. A music video, "Questions & Lies" was made too which sounded different from the album version being more upbeat, titled "Questions & Lies (With Drums)" later being released as part of the iTunes exclusive "Freedoming - EP". For her second solo effort she recorded many songs, which were to be released on the album, "Core: A Zone", which was postponed due to kidneythieves being brought back together, and has since been unreleased, however in 2006 Free released a taster of the album in the form of the 5-track "Core: A Zone - EP". Free also recorded a cover of "Heart Of Gold" during this time. In late 2011 and early 2012 Free performed solo gigs, as well as opening for Jimmy Gnecco. Free sent out newsletters indicating that her third solo album, "Volcano + The Sea" would get a Spring 2012 release, delighting many fans worldwide. Also she had been planning on repackaging a selection of songs from her first two solo records for sometime, and finally announced an early 2012 release for them.

Bruce Somers has been working with the band Good Charlotte on their live production for their current world tour. Bruce mastered the latest releases from Richard Patrick's band Filter as well as the latest CD's by former Marilyn Manson and current Rob Zombie guitarist John 5. Bruce composed the music for "Coming Up Roses," a new film featuring Bernadette Peters. The feature was directed by Lisa Albright. Look for a theatrical release in 2011. Bruce recently composed the music for the 27th Northrop Grumman National Space Symposium.
