= Phi in the Sky =

EP by Kidneythieves
- Released: November 20, 2001
- Genre: Industrial rock
- Length: 36:25
- Label: Extasy International
- Producer: Bruce M. Somers

Kidneythieves chronology
Trickster (1998)	Phi in the Sky (2001)	Zerøspace (2002)

Professional ratings
Review scores
Source	Rating
Allmusic	1.5/5 stars

Phi in the Sky is an EP released by Kidneythieves in 2001, between the albums Trickster and Zerøspace. It features remixes and album versions of songs from Zerøspace.

== Track listing ==
1. "Black Bullet" (album version)
2. "Placebo" (Terminalhead remix)
3. "Zerøspace" (album version)
4. "Zerøspace" (Q-Burns Abstract Message remix)
5. "Spank" (KMFDM remix)
6. "Zerøspace" (DJ Merritt remix)
