= Trickster (album) =

Studio album by Kidneythieves
- Released: July 28, 1998
- Genre: Industrial rock, industrial metal
- Length: 43:50
- Label: Push Records

Kidneythieves chronology
Trickster (1998)	Phi in the Sky (2001)

Kidneythieves chronology
Zerøspace (2002)	Trickstereprocess (2004)	Trypt0fanatic (2010)

Professional ratings
Review scores
Source	Rating
Allmusic	3/5 stars
Pitchfork	6.2/10

Trickster was the first album released by Kidneythieves, on July 28, 1998. The album was released with the single "S+M (A Love Song)", as well as "Taxicab Messiah" which had a music video. It was rereleased in 2004 as Trickstereprocess (see below).

== Track listing ==
1. Taxicab Messiah - 4:20
2. S+M (A Love Song) - 3:33
3. Swanmate - 1:04
4. Feathers - 3:39
5. Trickster - 4:35
6. Creature - 4:30
7. K - 4:05
8. Pretty - 5:22
9. Layers - 3:50
10. Pleasant - 3:35
11. Mustard Seed - 5:17

== Trickstereprocess ==
Trickstereprocess is a 2004 re-release of the first CD from the Kidneythieves, completely digitally remastered. It includes five new bonus tracks. It also includes a bonus DVD that includes never before seen concert and rehearsal footage, as well as Kidneythieves music videos.

=== Track listing ===
CD:

1. Taxicab Messiah - 4:20
2. S+M (A Love Song) - 3:33
3. Swanmate - 1:04
4. Feathers - 3:39
5. Trickster - 4:35
6. Creature - 4:30
7. K - 4:05
8. Pretty - 5:22
9. Layers - 3:50
10. Pleasant - 3:35
11. Mustard Seed - 5:17
12. Veteran - 3:58
13. Red & Violet - 3:20
14. Taxicab Messiah (live) - 4:25
15. Pleasant (live) - 3:37
16. Before I'm Dead (acoustic) - 3:47

DVD:

1. red & violet [music video]
2. red & violet [multi-angle music video]
3. red & violet [boomerang-effect music video]
4. black bullet [live]
5. taxicab messiah [live]
6. before i'm dead [live]
7. glitter girl [live]
8. zerospace [live]
9. dyskrasia [live]
10. zerospace [music video]
11. taxicab messiah [music video]
12. credits

== Notes ==
- Some of the songs from this album were featured in the video game Deus Ex: Invisible War. These songs were performed by the in-game character, international pop star NG Resonance (voiced by lead vocalist Free Dominguez). (Tracks: 1 - 5, 9 & 10)
