= The Nameless Mod =

- Developer: Off Topic Productions
- Designer: Jonas Wæver
- Composers: Leonardo Badinella, Steve Foxon, Martin Ahm Nielsen, Andrew Livingston, Graeme Arthur, Jonathan Gladwill, Trent Robertson
- Engine: Unreal Engine 1
- Platform: Microsoft Windows
- Release: March 14, 2009
- Genre: Action role-playing game
- Mode: Single-player

The Nameless Mod (TNM) is a third-party total conversion modification released for the first-person shooter video game Deus Ex in 2009 by Off Topic Productions. It was in development for seven years, during which it was highly anticipated. It contains two main storylines, each taking 15 hours or longer to play through, depending on whether the player focuses on exploration and completing secondary objectives rather than completing the main story.

== Gameplay ==
The gameplay is mostly identical to that of Deus Ex, save for a few additions, such as an in-game IRC client which adds a multiplayer element to an otherwise single-player game. In addition, the mod adds a highly configurable difficulty system, the ability to skip all cut scenes and a new training mission to acclimatize players to the changes. It also features some scripted linear sequences and levels, which are mainly used to modify the atmosphere (e.g. navigating through a maze full of deadly robots or going through a hall with laser traps), although most of the maps in the game retain the multiple-solution standard set by Deus Ex.

=== Weapons ===
With regard to weapons, the biggest change in TNM is that the player character can now fight with his fists, and can use different gloves to augment his fists by adding different effects to his punches. Moreover, the fists can be improved by investing skill points in their respective category, which now replaces the swimming skill (which was considered by many to be fairly useless).

Other than that, the weapon arsenal was also upgraded, featuring several katanas, three new grenades, a napalm launcher and a rifle which fires PHAT rays (PHysically Anamorphic Transmogryphing rays which cause living targets to swell up until they explode) and rice bags as secondary ammunition. In addition to several other completely new weapons, the mod includes unique versions of some of the original weapons, pre-customised to suit the needs of particular characters. Some weapons now include multiple firing modes rather than secondary ammo type, which allows them to change the weapons function instantaneously.

The weapon modding feature was carried over from Deus Ex – players can modify existing guns, rifles and shotguns, but, unique to TNM, the changes will be reflected in the weapon model as well as in the weapon's functionality.

=== Meta Data ===
In any playthrough of the game, information about the world is gained, mainly in the form of passwords. The player can use those passwords on subsequent playthroughs, and therefore access certain areas that wouldn't be available in normal circumstances. This is anticipated, and many of the supposed sequence breakers are countered by interaction with the game's supervising AI, Narcissus. This adds more depth to game, as Narcissus has a major role in one of the game's endings.

== Synopsis ==
=== Setting ===
TNM takes place in the first 3 days of September 2004, in PlanetDeusEx Forum City, a city state on ForumPlanet. PlanetDeusEx is only one Forum City out of many, although it is the only one playable. Each Forum City draws inspiration from a different game, with its general architecture and rules being that of the game. Such as, PlanetDeusEx features augmentations, while other Forum Cities feature their games' respective kind of enhancement. PlanetWarcraft, for example, features resources, and PlanetQuake features power-ups. Even though they are all unique to each Forum City, they all represent the user's rank. Because the city is devoted to Deus Ex, many of its dwellers, which represent the users' avatars, will try to emulate or reference it, e.g. building secret basements, coming up with conspiracy theories, and of course doing some conspiring of their own. This setting also means that Internet nomenclature is widely used, such that an infolink call is referred to as a Private Message, police officers are replaced by "firewalls", the ruler of Forum City is called the "admin", and so on.

=== Plot ===
Trestkon, a retired intelligence agent, is called back to duty by the government because of a missing moderator, Deus Diablo. They believe Trestkon is the only person who can be trusted, as Trestkon has been removed from the politics of the city for a few years. As soon as he arrives to Forum City, Trestkon is faced with the decision of which faction to side with: the moderators of PlanetDeusEx (PDX) who summoned him or the megalomaniac Scara B. King, CEO of WorldCorp (WC). Depending on the player's choice, the story changes radically. If the player joins PDX, Trestkon will continue his search for the missing moderator with his friends. Should the player choose WC, Trestkon will instead help Scara exploit the weakened government to gain world dominance while fighting against PDX. The choice is made through interaction with Silver Dragon, a local cultist who vandalized WC property and is trapped in the basement of the WorldCorp building. Choosing to rescue him will help PDX, while choosing to kill him will help WC.

If the player chooses to work with PDX, Trestkon is sent to spy on their primary suspect for the abduction, WorldCorp. This puts them on to the existence of an old device that may be able to lead them to Deus Diablo, buried in the ruins of the city that Forum City was literally built on top of, Deus Ex Incarnate. After dealing with an incident of sabotage by WorldCorp, Trestkon delves into the ruins and retrieves the device, known as the "Firestaff". Trestkon then returns to Forum City where he must promptly deal with an ambush by WorldCorp mercenaries who have attacked the city in a desperate stalling move. Back at PDX headquarters, the Firestaff reveals that Deus Diablo is located on a previously unknown space station orbiting Forumplanet. Trestkon is sent to rescue the only independent helicopter pilot in the city from the clutches of a terrorist organisation (whom he may either annihilate or forge a truce with) so he can get to Aunt Betty Industries, a clothing factory outside the City which is a front for a space research facility. There, Trestkon secures a shuttle that takes him to the space station.

If the player chooses to work for WorldCorp, he is immediately told about the Firestaff, its purpose, and its location. Unfortunately DXI is closed to the public, including WorldCorp agents, so in order to gain access, Trestkon must acquire the highly guarded admin password for the city. Following a failed blackmail attempt and a dangerous loyalty test, Trestkon finally manages to steal the password from PDX's high-security server complex and goes into DXI to retrieve the Firestaff. In this storyline too, Trestkon emerges into an ambush, but this time set up by PDX. When the Firestaff reveals Deus Diablo's orbital location, he is sent to steal a helicopter and interrogate its pilot to obtain the codes to its navigation system. As a final obstacle before he can go to Aunt Betty Industries for their space shuttle, Trestkon is forced to infiltrate an air-control tower to lift an electronic lockdown detaining the helicopter.

In either storyline, when Trestkon reaches the space station, he is faced with the final decision of what faction to support. The options available to the player are based on previous decisions, such that not all options are accessible at any time:

- PDX ending: Trestkon takes over the station and bans Scara. This puts PDX in total control of Forum City and indeed all of ForumPlanet, and enables the moderators of each city to establish real democracy.
- WorldCorp ending: Trestkon destroys PDX using a laser powerful enough even to kill the otherwise immortal moderators. He then takes over the station and either makes Scara the omnipotent ruler of ForumPlanet, getting control of Forum City in return, or bans Scara and rules the world himself.
- Ryan ending: Trestkon sides with the eccentric owner of Aunt Betty Industries and destroys the space station, negating all the power of the government. This also kills all communications and electricity, rendering WC useless. Forum City is ruled by anarchy.
- Narcissus ending: a hidden ending in which Trestkon discovers that he is actually in a game and, with the player's help, learns to accept his role as a computer game character.

=== Cultural references ===
TNM features a more advanced text-reading system than that of Deus Ex, allowing the player to read multiple pages of the same book and allowing the books themselves to contain more information. Many of the texts in the world are used to expand the setting, and, true to TNM's setting, a large part of it was published through the internet, such as Twist, a novelization of Deus Ex, and Got Ghand #17, an article from a column in PlanetDeusEx. However, there are also excerpts from literary works outside of the internet, such as Douglas Adams's The Hitchhiker's Guide to the Galaxy and John Gray's Men Are from Mars, Women Are from Venus.

Outside of the content present in the books, there is also a huge number of popular and internet culture reference, such as the tasteful use of leet speak, posters and disc cases of popular games and movies, a minigame based around quotes and a mission with dialogue made up almost entirely of popular movie quotes. There is also one reference in the form of a weapon, the DaiKatana, which harms the player's character as he uses it. This is a reference to Daikatana, a well-known overhyped and buggy game.

== Development ==
TNM was started as a mod for Deus Ex on January 6, 2002 by Lawrence Laxdal. The original mod was similar to the finished product only by the basic premise, as it was planned as a one or two map mission. At the time, Jonas Wæver acted as the lead writer of the project, with the rest of the team made up of volunteer modders from the PlanetDeusEx forum. After a false start as an open-world game, TNM tried to follow Deus Ex's design style, but only in later stages was Deus Ex analyzed from a design point of view. According to the team, there was no pre-production phase – game assets were being produced while the design documents were written.

After a period of development, it was decided that the mod would expand beyond its original scope. This also led to an effort to broaden the target audience, because of the notoriety of the forum fan fiction genre, by taking in feedback from outside the team. Further into development, in order to control the project, Laxdal and Wæver started letting people go based on whether or not they were reliable. This has led to an interesting dynamic, in which developers who contributed more to the end project were also given more time for their pet projects, which are mostly additional features that contribute only to the gameplay and setting.

The scope of the project made it very time consuming to develop. Because of that, many of the assets were used as many times as possible, and often, two missions in different storylines take place on the same level. As the developers were spread across the world and were working for free, traditional management was impossible. Therefore, the team communicated mainly through instant messaging clients such as MSN Messenger, a developer forum and through an online database, which kept everyone on the team synchronised.

After the release, the developers continued to provide support for the mod in the form of patches and by personally dealing with issues in the forums. They also released several developer commentaries discussing the development process and post-mortem of the mod.

== Music ==
TNM Official Soundtrack

Soundtrack album by various artists
- Released: December 10, 2009
- Recorded: 2002–2009
- Genres: Ambient, electronic, jazz fusion, trip hop, alternative metal
- Length: 144:31
- Label: Open source

The soundtrack of TNM was composed by Graeme Arthur, Leonardo Badinella, Steve Foxon, Brian Giannotti, Jonathan Gladwill, Andrew Livingston, Martin Ahm Nielsen and Trent Robertson. As each artist comes from a different background, the soundtrack contains various mixed genres, including ambient music, jazz fusion, techno, light rock, metal and classical music. Similar to Deus Ex, each setting in the game has multiple tracks, with the actions of the player affecting which track will play at any given time. For example, joining WorldCorp will change the track played in the rival PlanetDeusEx building from Democracy, Pt. I to Democracy, Pt. II, a more suspenseful track containing similar motifs.

The TNM Official Soundtrack was released as a free download on December 10, 2009 on two discs, one featuring the music from friendly settings and the other featuring the music from the hostile ones. It does not include all of the tracks of TNM, but rather 25 hand-picked remastered and remixed tracks.

The song "Looking at You" by Music Playing Disorder, which features Leonardo Badinella, is played during the end credits.

=== Track listing ===
Disc 1 - Friendly
No.	Title	Composer	Length
1.	"The Nameless Theme"	Leonardo Badinella	3:05
2.	"Democracy Pt.I"	Leonardo Badinella	6:57
3.	"City Lights"	Martin Ahm Nielsen	7:16
4.	"Frequency Modulated"	Steve Foxon	9:20
5.	"Esoteric Semblance"	Graeme Arthur	9:34
6.	"The Party Zone"	Jonathan Gladwill	3:07
7.	"Urban Decay"	Martin Ahm Nielsen	5:14
8.	"Sol's Pt.I"	Leonardo Badinella	3:52
9.	"City of 00n"	Andrew Livingston	8:26
10.	"Spirits"	Martin Ahm Nielsen	5:02
11.	"Glass and Metal Pt.I"	Martin Ahm Nielsen	5:15
12.	"PDX Endgame"	Leonardo Badinella	2:55
13.	"ABI Endgame"	Leonardo Badinella	2:40
Total length:			1:12:38

Disc 2 - Hostile
No.	Title	Composer	Length
1.	"Sub Stance"	Steve Foxon	9:12
2.	"Under the Earth"	Steve Foxon	8:38
3.	"Sol Pt.II"	Leonardo Badinella	4:50
4.	"Hideout"	Martin Ahm Nielsen	4:46
5.	"Democracy Pt.II"	Leonardo Badinella	4:04
6.	"The Horror"	Trent Robertson	2:45
7.	"Glass and Metal Pt.II"	Martin Ahm Nielsen	5:55
8.	"Rewired"	Steve Foxon, Andrew Livingston	7:42
9.	"Strange String Thing"	Steve Foxon	7:25
10.	"Sub-Frequency"	Steve Foxon	4:58
11.	"Axis of Rotation"	Leonardo Badinella	9:39
12.	"WC Endgame"	Leonardo Badinella	2:12
Total length:			1:11:55

== Reception ==
The Nameless Mod received very positive reviews. The Australian PC PowerPlay gave it a 9/10 calling the gameplay perfect, while complaining about some bugs and lamenting the age of the graphics and audio somewhat. German magazine GameStar gave it a 5/5. The Mod also made first place Mod DB's Editor's Choice for Single-Player Mod of the Year, and 8th place on the player's choice for all categories of mods. As of 2023, it holds a 9.7/10 score in Mod DB's user rating.

The setting of the mod, however, got a polarized reception. Some of the reviewers found it fun and delightfully lighthearted, while others disliked it for perceived in-jokes and the goofiness of the characters, which is in contrast to Deus Ex's more serious style. Others complained about the attitude inconsistencies, with some aspects of the game being completely ridiculous (e.g. the cults) and some being far more serious.

TNM also attracted the attention of Eidos Montréal, which was developing a prequel to Deus Ex. While TNM was not officially commented on, it was well appreciated by its developers, as they gave Off Topic Productions two exclusive screenshots from their project, Deus Ex: Human Revolution, to include in the mod. Those screenshots were indeed included in a later patch, and can be found in one of the secret areas.
