= JC Denton =

Fictional character from the Deus Ex video game series

- Deus Ex character
- JC Denton in Deus Ex
- First appearance: Deus Ex (2000)
- Created by: Warren Spector, Harvey Smith
- Voiced by: Jay Anthony Franke

In-universe information
- Species: Cyborg
- Occupation: Nano-augmented agent
- Affiliation: UNATCO (initially), NSF, ApostleCorp (Invisible War)
- Nationality: American
- Real name: Player determinant (first game)
- Status: Player determinant (Invisible War)

JC Denton is a fictional character and the player character and protagonist of the first-person role-playing video game Deus Ex and a supporting character in its sequel, Deus Ex: Invisible War. He is voiced by Jay Anthony Franke in both games. Denton was created by Deus Ex director Warren Spector. In his twenties, Denton begins the first Deus Ex as a new graduate of UNATCO, and a prized nano-augmented agent. JC is initially dedicated to his duties, but is influenced by his brother, fellow nano-augmented UNATCO agent Paul Denton.

The character was intentionally designed as a blank slate, one which the player could roleplay and immerse themselves in. This characteristic led to criticism by reviewers, who singled out his monotone delivery and lack of prominent personality flaws. Despite this, JC Denton remains a popular and iconic video game character, with critics citing his deadpan humor as a memorable aspect.

== Concept and design ==
JC was designed as a blank slate, in accordance with the roleplaying elements of Deus Ex. The creators sought to maximize immersion in the game and player freedom. Warren Spector reported taking this "maybe too far" and developers directed Denton's voice actor "no emotion in your voice, no inflection, nothing". Spector continued: "That's how far we were willing to go to ensure that the players inhabited the body of the character."

JC's deadpan-voice and sarcasm was an influence for Adam Jensen, protagonist of the prequel series.

"JC Denton" is said to be a codename, and the player can create JC's true name and pick from a variety of preset appearances. In addition, JC's skill-set and augmentations may be customized, defining JC's characteristics. JC's personality and morality may be defined by the player, through actions and dialogue choices. JC Denton's voice actor, Jay Anthony Franke, was a quality-assurance tester at Ion Storm Studios, and did work on a previous game of the studio, Daikatana. This led to him being hired for the role of Denton. Franke was also a tester on Deus Ex, his lines not added until the end of production.

Denton is the clone of Paul Denton (also voiced by Franke), the first nano-augmented agent in the Deus Ex universe, though ostensibly not the first nano-augmented person. The two came from a family in poverty, until Paul was noticed by members of Majestic-12. In exchange for money, Paul's mother carries a clone of him, and eventually gives birth to JC. The two are shepherded by Majestic-12, with their parents murdered and JC put into a Majestic-12 run school.

Paul has been noted by critics to be an anchor for JC, as a non-controllable character whose motivation and actions are not decided by the player. Kirk Hamilton in Kotaku writes "J.C. Denton, by way of our actions, became a hero or a monster, and that transformation was largely reflected through the lens of his brother Paul."

== Appearances ==
=== Deus Ex ===
In the original, Denton begins as a newly graduated nano-augmented agent of UNATCO (United Nations Anti-Terrorist Coalition), fighting the secessionist NSF in New York. However, he learns that he is a pawn of a global conspiracy led by the organisation Majestic-12, and so defects with Paul. The ending of the game allows him to side with the Illuminati to bring about a benevolent conspiracy over the world, destroy the internet and bring about a decentralized dark age over the world, or merge with the artificial intelligence Helios in order to govern the world.

=== Deus Ex: Invisible War ===
In the second game, JC is no longer the player character. Invisible War takes place after events that mix elements from multiple of Deus Ex's endings. Denton brings about the collapse of globalized civilization but merges with Helios; however, this merger becomes problematic, almost killing him and forcing him into cryogenic stasis. His two accomplices, Paul and scientist Tracer Tong, both seek to bring about his plans while he is in stasis, by forming the organisation ApostleCorp. ApostleCorp trains JC's clone and second sibling, Alex Denton. The transhumanist agenda of ApostleCorp brings it into conflict with the other factions, the Templars, Illuminati, and Omar, in Invisible War. Alex awakens JC from stasis, and has the choice of aiding him in his plans to unite humanity in a post-human society or opposing him and killing him. If JC is sided with, Helios succeeds in creating a singularity-level society. If JC is opposed and Alex sides with another faction, JC is killed by the player, although Helios revives him during the last moments for a final fight.

== Characteristics ==
While the meaning of his initials is never revealed in the games, they were revealed by Warren Spector in 2017 to stand for "Jesus Christ", as fans had speculated since the game's release. Denton's full name was based on a friendly exclamation Spector often used, "Jesus Christ, Denton", referring to his friend, the writer Bradley Denton. This exclamation can be heard in the game shouted by Walton Simons if the player chooses to kill the prisoners while he interrogates them downstairs at UNATCO headquarters. The developers were planning to go further and make Denton a descendant of Jesus Christ, but this was never used in the game.

== Reception ==
In 2012, GamesRadar+ called JC Denton one of the best heroes in gaming, describing him as "the kind of guy you’d bring in if you need something done, and you need it done right". Characterizing him as a futuristic version of Sherlock Holmes, the site pointed to his intelligence, resourcefulness, and loner attitude as making him effective, while also calling him a "walking biochemistry project" due to his augmentations. Noting that Denton was "always up to the task", they nevertheless reinforced the fact that the player decided Denton's loyalties.

JC Denton and later Human Revolution protagonist Adam Jensen have sometimes been compared by critics due to their similarities. Robert Zak of PCGamesN stated that, while he believed that Denton and Jensen were similar at first, both being "mild rip-offs of Neo from The Matrix", upon replaying Deus Ex, he realized there was more to Denton than he had remembered. Calling JC a "bloody joker" and "an embodiment of action hero one-liner cheekiness who lightens the tone of a game at just the right moments", he cited witty retorts made by Denton to the leader of the NSF and fellow agent Anna Navarre. Explaining that Denton had "likeable brashness", Zak called him "a bit of a dick, but in an irreverent way", noting that the game had not, like its successors, tried to take its "crackpot" narratives overly seriously. In contrast, he described Jensen's dialog as full of "awkwardly written earnestness". While Rock Paper Shotgun's Alec Meer called Denton the "blankest of blank characters", he stated that Denton's motivations and dynamics were still better than Jensen's, due to the supporting characters surrounding him such as Paul Denton.

Kotaku's Kirk Hamilton wrote that the player embodied Denton's motivation by pressing the "W" key, allowing him to become either a hero or a monster, while the transformation was depicted via the lens of his brother. Contrasting Denton with Solid Snake, a similar "blank slate" character, he noted that Snake spent the previous decade growing without the player's help.

== Legacy ==
In 2021, a modding team released the Lay D Denton Project, which restored Ion Storm's original vision to have JC Denton be a gender-selectable protagonist, adding a female incarnation of Denton with full voice acting by Karen Rohan that mimicked the original as closely as possible. All references to Denton being male were changed, including splicing the original dialog.
