= Deus Ex: Invisible War =

2003 video game

- North American PC cover art
- Developer: Ion Storm
- Publisher: Eidos Interactive
- Director: Harvey Smith
- Producers: Bill Money; Paul Weaver
- Designer: Ricardo Bare
- Programmer: Chris Carollo
- Artists: Whitney Ayres; Sergio Rosas
- Writers: Sheldon Pacotti; Sarah Paetsch
- Composers: Alexander Brandon; Todd Simmons
- Series: Deus Ex
- Engine: Unreal Engine 2
- Platforms: Microsoft Windows; Xbox
- Release: NA: December 2, 2003; EU: March 5, 2004
- Genres: Action role-playing, first-person shooter, stealth
- Mode: Single-player

Deus Ex: Invisible War is a 2003 action role-playing video game developed by Ion Storm and published by Eidos Interactive for Microsoft Windows and Xbox. It is the second game in the Deus Ex series. The gameplay—combining first-person shooter, stealth, and role-playing elements—features exploration and combat in environments connected to multiple city-based hubs, in addition to quests that can be completed in a variety of ways and flexible character customization. Conversations between characters feature a variety of responses, with options in conversations at crucial story points affecting how some events play out.

Invisible War takes place twenty years after Deus Ex. The game follows a scenario whereby a combination of all three possible endings of Deus Ex took place, and the first game's events led to a period of war and economic depression dubbed the "Collapse", which resulted in several factions attaining power and influence across the world. The player character, Alex D, is evacuated from Chicago to Seattle following a terrorist attack, soon becoming embroiled in a network of plots as factions fight for control of the world. In addition to the series' recurring cyberpunk setting and conspiracy theory motif, the story focuses on the theme of terrorism.

Development of Invisible War began following the success of Deus Ex. The aim was to create a more accessible version of the original game's systems while preserving its essentials. Original designer Harvey Smith directed the game, while Alexander Brandon and Sheldon Pacotti returned respectively as composer and scenario writer. Additional music and voice work was provided by the rock band Kidneythieves. Due to being developed for PC and Xbox, the game's environments needed to be designed with the console's hardware limitations in mind. In later interviews, members of the team have faulted their decisions for the title.

The game was acclaimed for its graphics, narrative and the freedom of choice in both gameplay and story. Criticism was directed towards enemy artificial intelligence, some of the design choices and problems with the PC port. The game has sold over one million copies worldwide as of 2011. Later opinions from both journalists and the game's staff have been polarized, with several websites calling Invisible War the weakest entry in the Deus Ex series. After several unsuccessful efforts to create a third Deus Ex game prior to Ion Storm's 2005 closure, a prequel to the first game, Deus Ex: Human Revolution, was developed by Eidos Montréal and released in 2011.

== Gameplay ==
The player, as Alex D, faces a soldier in one of the game's main locations (HUD in image is from beta version and different from most releases).

Deus Ex: Invisible War is an action role-playing game with incorporated first-person shooter and stealth mechanics. Players take the role of Alex D, whose gender and general appearance can be customized at the beginning of the game. The game has multiple difficulty settings; these range from "Easy", which increases damage to enemies, to "Realistic", which raises enemy health while also decreasing available ammunition. The player moves around the environment, being able to climb ladders and jump onto crates, and crouch to negotiate narrow spaces. Items such as datacubes and holoprojectors can be accessed to expand upon the narrative and progress the story. Certain objects in the game can be carried or thrown, from small items to human bodies. Each hub area of the game has a variety of missions given to the player by non-playable characters (NPCs), which the player can choose to accept or ignore; these missions include quests linked to the main story and side quests unique to each hub area. These objectives can be completed in a variety of ways; these include using stealth to infiltrate an area, opening access points using hacking, or launching an armed assault. When talking with NPCs, the player has access to multiple dialogue options, with the option chosen influencing the course of the conversation.

There are a variety of melee and ranged weapons in the game, both lethal and non-lethal; the melee weapons include a combat knife, a baton, and a "stun prod" shock device. Ranged weapons include a pistol, a shotgun, a rifle, an SMG, and a rocket launcher. Other weapon types include a variety of grenades and bombs. All guns found in the game share the same ammunition pool, which is represented by a bar, and each gun type uses different amounts from the pool. Guns can be customized with items and pieces of equipment, such as outfitting a gun with a silencer or allowing it to shoot through glass silently. Other upgrades increase maximum damage and decrease ammunition use. Items, weapons, ammunition, and equipment are purchased with credits, the in-game currency either gathered in the environment or earned through quests. Items range from tools such as disposable multitools for unlocking doors to canisters that replenish health or energy. Defeated enemies drop items that can be collected, or can be found in the environment or in containers such as boxes and cabinets. The player can carry up to twelve item types, with consumable items able to be stacked in a single slot.

During the course of the game, the player acquires biomods – nanite-filled canisters that enhance their physical and mental attributes. There are two types of biomod canisters in the game: standard canisters and black market versions, both either found in the environment or purchased from certain NPCs. Standard and black market biomods cannot be installed in the same slot. Biomods are installed in five different slots representing different parts of the body—"Arm", "Cranial", "Eye", "Leg", and "Skeletal". Each region has three enhancement options the player can activate. Some biomod enhancements are exclusive to either standard or black market biomods. Biomod abilities range from enhancements to strength and agility to abilities linked to hacking terminals and taking control of hostile robots. Once activated, further biomod canisters can be used to upgrade existing abilities, or uninstall an ability to change it around, deleting and replacing the chosen enhancement with the new one. Biomod abilities tied to abilities such as cloaking use up the a portion of the player's energy bar when activated.

== Synopsis ==
=== Setting ===
Invisible War is set in the year 2072, twenty years after the events of the original Deus Ex; the Deus Ex series is set in a cyberpunk future rife with secret organizations and conspiracies such as the Illuminati and Majestic 12, an Illuminati splinter faction. During the first game's events in 2052, original protagonist JC Denton—a clone designed to serve Majestic 12—was drawn into a secret war between the Illuminati and Majestic 12, led by industrialist Bob Page. Page intended to make himself a global dictator by first undermining the Illuminati by creating a pandemic to blackmail the world's elite into supporting Majestic 12, then merging himself with the artificial intelligence (AI) Helios. In the back-story revealed in the course of Invisible War, a combination of all three possible endings of Deus Ex took place; JC kills Majestic 12 leader Bob Page, merges with Helios, destroys Majestic 12's base in Area 51 to cripple the world communication network, then sides with the Illuminati to rebuild the world in the wake of these events. JC's actions triggered a worldwide period of war and depression dubbed the "Collapse". Following the Collapse, major capitals organize themselves into city states, creating walled enclaves where the population can be watched and expansion is closely controlled. The story moves between a variety of locations across the world, starting in Seattle and moving on to Cairo, Trier and Antarctica. A recurring feature are "Augmentations", advanced nanotechnologies that enhance the human body; the type used in Invisible War are dubbed "biomods".

=== Characters and factions ===
The main protagonist is "Alex D"; their full name is Alex Denton, a clone from the same program which created JC and Paul Denton. Spirited away shortly before the events of Deus Ex, Alex is raised in Chicago before being inducted into the Tarsus Academy, a group controlled by the Denton-created ApostleCorp. At Tarsus, Alex is trained in the use of biomods. Alex's gender is chosen at the beginning of the game, with their selected gender affecting how some people react to them in conversations. Along with Alex, three other Tarsus students are encountered through the story: Billie Adams, a long-term friend of Alex; Leo Jankowski, a high-ranking and impulsive trainee; and Klara Sparks, a modest student who acts as Leo's friend and support. The students are overseen by Leila Nassif. Returning characters from Deus Ex include JC Denton; his brother Paul, who is rendered comatose after an unsuccessful biomod infusion; and Tracer Tong, an ally of the Dentons.

There are several factions within Invisible War that Alex is contacted by and can choose to side with and represent different viewpoints on how humanity's post-Collapse society should develop. The two factions handling reconstruction in city enclaves are a future version of the World Trade Organization (WTO), which builds and maintains the emergent city states, acting as the de facto government body; and the Order, a religion combining concepts from multiple faiths which has gained support from people outside the enclaves and is opposed to the WTO's policies. Later in the game it is revealed that both the Order and the WTO are puppet organizations of the Illuminati, respectively led by Illuminati members Nicolette DuClare and Chad Dumier, the latter a veteran of the war against Majestic 12. Two other factions are the Knights Templar, a group led by former Order leader Saman that makes militant strikes against groups espousing biomod use; and the Omar, a cult of cybernetically-enhanced humans who share a hive mind.

=== Plot ===
Note: While the general plot of Invisible War follows a distinct path, many elements such as faction alliances and character interactions are subject to the player's decisions. The game also offers several subplots and explanations which the player may or may not encounter, depending on their actions within the game. This synopsis concentrates on the main, unavoidable plot thread of the game.

The game opens after a terrorist attack on Chicago by the Knights Templar: a nanite bomb turns the entire city into grey goo, with the staff and trainees of the city's Tarsus Academy facility barely escaping in time to Tarsus' Seattle facility. After that too is attacked by terrorists, Alex discovers with Billie's help that Tarsus has been observing their trainees in secret under the guidance of Nassif, escapes the facility and is subsequently offered missions by Tarsus, the Order, the WTO, and the Omar. During these missions, Alex learns that their biomods were created by ApostleCorp, and follows Nassif from Seattle to Cairo, which is being disrupted by fighting between the factions. Alex's fellow students follow different paths during the narrative; Billie initially allies with the Order before joining the Knights Templar, Klara joins the WTO, while Leo becomes involved with the Omar and can become an unwilling convert.

After locating Nassif, Alex learns that they are part of JC's plan to distribute their biomod technology worldwide, and that JC is currently incapacitated due to his own augmentations clashing with Helios. Alex goes to Trier to use a teleportation gate to reach JC's hiding place in Antarctica. While in Trier, Alex meets up with Tong and is sent to save key figures from being killed by the Templars, learning of the Illuminati's involvement. After activating the teleportation gate and reaching Antarctica, Alex is confronted by Billie and then revives JC. JC explains his plan of connecting all of humanity to Helios using Alex's biomods, paving the way for an ideal democracy. Alex is sent to Cairo to revive Paul with their compatible biomods. There Alex has the option of saving Paul, killing him under orders from Dumier, or handing him over to Saman.

Brought by JC's agents to Liberty Island, Alex learns that the island holds an old part of the pre-Collapse worldwide communication network which can be used by each faction. No matter what choices Alex has made up to now, they can choose to side with any faction, or kill all the leaders on Liberty Island. If Alex follows JC's plan, the biomods are distributed worldwide, giving Helios the ability to access all human thought, allowing it to govern humanity. If Alex sides with the Illuminati, they use the network to help create a global surveillance state where communication and the economy are controlled. If Alex joins the Templars, they help unite humanity under a theocracy where biomod use and those considered impure are ruthlessly suppressed. Killing all other factions on Liberty Island leads to global chaos, turning Earth into a wasteland dominated by the Omar.

== Development ==
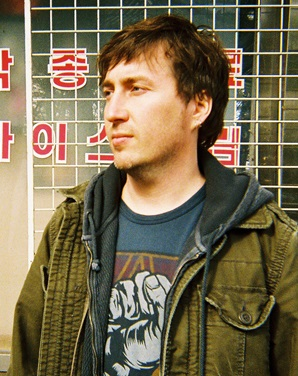
Harvey Smith (pictured 2006), who worked as a designer for the original Deus Ex, was the director for Invisible War.

Development of Invisible War began at series creator Ion Storm following the success of the original Deus Ex. Most of the development team returned, eager to both tell a new story and refine the original gameplay. There were also relative newcomers who had worked on the original game's PlayStation 2 (PS2) port. Harvey Smith, lead designer for the original game, was chosen by the original director and series creator Warren Spector to direct the game; Spector instead took on a supervisory role for both Invisible War and other projects within the company. While Smith was tempted to act as both director and designer, he saw that it would be too much work, so brought on Ricardo Bare as lead designer. Bare had been involved in the later development of Deus Ex, and despite his lack of experience as a designer was given the role when more qualified staff members were unavailable.

The music for the game was composed by Alexander Brandon and Todd Simmons; Brandon had previously worked on the original game. Brandon's guidance when composing the music for Invisible War was the sparse musical style of the Thief series, shifting away from the style used for the original game. The voice acting style also underwent changes, with the aim being for more professional performances. The improved voice acting was attributed to the team being given a larger budget. The soundtrack included six tracks from the album Trickster by industrial rock band Kidneythieves; the band's lead singer Free Dominguez provided voice work for the idol character NG Resonance. Dominguez described the experience of recording her voice work being fun.

When creating the game, the team's main aim was to create an experience that emulated the original game's freedom of choice while giving mainstream players more options for defining the player character. The gameplay drew inspiration from Ultima Underworld: The Stygian Abyss, System Shock, Dungeon Master and Thief: The Dark Project. Due to the game being designed for both consoles and PC players, the team wanted to minimize the number of menus to navigate, maintaining the core feeling of a first-person shooter. One of the aims was to improve the stealth elements, which the team felt was "broken" in Deus Ex. When designing the stealth, the team received input from the team developing Thief: Deadly Shadows, which was also in production at Ion Storm. They also had staff who had worked on Tom Clancy's Splinter Cell, then regarded as one of the best recent stealth-focused games. The original game's two different levelling systems of augmentations and skill points were combined into the biomod system. The use of universal ammunition was implemented so players would not need to worry about collecting ammunition types for multiple gun types. Spector later explained these changes as a means of helping sell the game to players outside the core fanbase; with both Invisible War and Thief: Deadly Shadows, they needed a wider player base in order to make the games profitable. A multiplayer mode, which had been added to the original game via a patch, was not included in Invisible War due to time and quality concerns.

The story was influenced by popular conspiracy theories, spy stories, and science fiction. The original writer for Deus Ex, Sheldon Pacotti, returned to write the game's script with newcomer Sarah Paetsch. A major difference from the first game was the player's freedom to change factions throughout the game, something not available in the first game. A core part of the experience was the branching narrative, giving the player multiple options of progress despite missions having a linear progression. Paetsch estimated that the game contained over 30,000 lines of voiced dialogue. The game's subtitle referred to the unseen battle that took place both around people and within them. The suggestion that all endings of Deus Ex should be part of the canon series of events was suggested by a staff member who worked on the original game's Hong Kong storyline. The locations were chosen for their distinct feel and—in some cases—iconic landmarks. They also chose locations associated at the time with the organizations featured in-game, such as Seattle and the WTO. The Antarctica setting was influenced by the John Carpenter's film The Thing. Rather than use JC as the main protagonist due to his actions in Deus Ex making him a grand figure in world history, the team created newcomer Alex, someone who would share JC's roots and begin "at the bottom of the pyramid", as was a popular element of many "immersive sim" games at the time. One of the themes included in the game was the nature of terrorism, and how people could be classified as terrorists or freedom fighters depending on circumstance.

While the original game was developed for Windows, the team developed Invisible War for console, using their experience creating the Deus Ex PS2 port. They chose the Xbox as it had the largest memory capacity. The biggest problem was the smaller processing power and RAM compared to PCs. Due to the limited hardware of the Xbox, the environment sizes needed to be scaled down compared to the first game, but the team tried to make the smaller areas denser, with more interactive elements. When creating the game, the team rebuilt all the systems from scratch from the engine to the render and sound system. The game used a combination of the Unreal Engine and the Havok physics software. The choice of Unreal was governed by several factors including familiarity with the engine and the wish to develop for both PC and console environments; while the basic structure of the Unreal Engine was used, the team replaced the renderer, artificial intelligence (AI) programming and physics engine. Integrating Havok allowed for "richer" simulation of real-time physics. The AI was designed to exhibit a wider range of responses than the original game, noticing disturbances, searching environments and being able to call in reinforcements. The CGI opening was created by Saab and Miller Productions, while the ending sequences were done by vTorque.

== Release ==
A sequel to Deus Ex was revealed by Eidos in 2001 through job listings advertising for designers to work on the game. Later that month at the 2001 Electronic Entertainment Expo (E3), Eidos confirmed that both the second Deus Ex and the next Thief game would be coming to consoles before arriving on PC; the explanation was that taking the restrictions of console hardware into account would make later ports to PC more effective. Eidos officially announced the game E3 2002; the platforms listed were PC, Xbox and PS2. It was later revealed that Ion Storm were struggling to work out how to port the game to PS2 given the extensive hardware differences between the three platforms, and were reluctant to do so due to these issues. Following the game's release, it was clarified that no PS2 version would be developed. As part of the promotion, the soundtrack was made available for download through the game's website. A demo was released in November 2003. The game was released in North America on December 2, 2003. Following the North American release, Ion Storm released a patch to fix issues with the graphics and additional gameplay elements such as quick saves. The game released in Europe on March 5, 2004. The Xbox version was also released in Japan. First announced in March 2004, the game was released on June 17.

== Reception ==
=== Sales ===
During its debut week in the United Kingdom, the game reached #3 in the charts, described as a respectable debut. In their financial report in April 2005, Eidos reported that Invisible War was among the titles to have sold between 500,000 and one million copies since release, placing it among their successful titles. As of April 2011, Invisible War has sold over 1.2 million copies worldwide, placing it above the original game in terms of copies sold.

=== Critical reception ===
Reception

Aggregate score
Aggregator	Score	
Aggregator	PC	Xbox
Metacritic	80/100 (44 reviews)	84/100 (50 reviews)

Review scores
Publication	Score	
Publication	PC	Xbox
Computer and Video Games	8.6/10	8/10
Eurogamer	N/A	8/10
Game Informer	9.5/10	9/10
GamePro	5/5	5/5
GameSpot	8/10	8/10
IGN	9/10	9/10
Official Xbox Magazine (US)	N/A	9.1/10
PC Gamer (US)	92%	N/A

Computer and Video Games called both versions of the game enjoyable despite elements of world building and gameplay not carried over from the original. Eurogamer's Rob Fahay, while noting that its focus on some aspects of the first game over others left it at a disadvantage, still called it "excellent". Adam Biessener and Justin Leeper of Game Informer, respectively reviewing the PC and Xbox versions, praised the variety of choices in gameplay and the quality of the story and voice performances, calling both great examples of games within the science fiction genre. GamePro praised the story, its extensive voice acting, the number of choices available in gameplay progression and the completion of objectives.

GameSpot's Greg Kasavin, who reviewed both versions, praised the game's ambition and the elements that worked, but said that people would focus on the faults with its narrative delivery and gameplay structure; he summed up the game as a "great and original experience that's well worthwhile". Steve Butts of IGN said that, while some would say the gameplay made too many concessions towards casual players, it was still a well-built and enjoyable video game, praising most of the alterations made by the developers. Ryan McCaffrey of Official Xbox Magazine called the game a "brilliant RPG" despite noting its short length, praising its narrative, gameplay freedom, and in-game physics. Kieron Gillen, reviewing the game for PC Gamer, praised the game's wide variety of choice despite some elements such as the biomod upgrade system not evolving. He noted that the elements that had not been directly carried over from Deus Ex would taint people's perception of the game.

General praise went to the variety of choice in its narrative and gameplay, despite the former being seen as lacking in places and the latter being held back by other factors such as the limitations of the Biomod upgrade system and its limited environment sizes. Poor AI behavior was also a recurring criticism. The Xbox version was praised for its performance and graphics despite several reviewers noting distracting drops in frame rate and other technical issues. The PC version was frequently criticized as having similar frame rate issues in addition to problems with the controls, the necessity for a powerful computer to run the game properly, and the fact that the game was scaled down to run on the Xbox.

=== Accolades ===
As part of his review, McCaffrey named the game as "Editor's Choice". At the National Academy of Video Game Trade Reviewers 2003 awards ceremony, Invisible War was nominated for awards in the "Character Design" and "Lighting/Texturing" categories. At the 2004 Game Developers Choice Awards, Pacotti and Paetsch were nominated in the "Excellence in Writing" category for their work on the game. At that year's Interactive Achievement Awards, the game was nominated in the categories of "Computer Role-Playing Game of the Year" and "Console First-Person Action Game of the Year".

== Legacy ==
Invisible War has retrospectively been seen as the weakest mainline entry in the Deus Ex series compared to both the original game and subsequent titles. IGN's Brian Albert, in a history of the series, felt that its technical shortcomings and science fiction aesthetics prevented Invisible War from finding the same appeal as the original game. Neon Kelly of VideoGamer.com said the game was "widely regarded as a disappointment" due to the controversial design choices relating to its gameplay and console-focused structure.

Several retrospectives on the game have cited it as a disappointing game in the wake of the highly acclaimed original: both Heather Alexandra of Kotaku and Richard Cobbett of PC Gamer said that—while the game was not bad in itself—it failed to live up to the Deus Ex series traditions and worked against the brand. In a dedicated retrospective of the game for Eurogamer, Tristan Donovan said that the game was "destined to spend its future living in the shadow of the game that came before it and, now, the game that came after it", despite it having enough elements to be considered an entry in the Deus Ex series.

Members of staff have also spoken out against their role in the game: Spector openly regrets listening to the focus testers during early development as this influenced the shift in setting, Brandon faulted the sound—the more professional voice acting and sparse musical style—as being foreign to the Deus Ex series, while in multiple interviews Smith expressed disappointment with the design decisions taken with the game despite him still liking it. In a conversation with Spector during a lecture at the University of Texas, Smith voiced his opinions on the game's development:

"I feel like we f----- up the technology management of it, [...] We had bad team chemistry. We wrote the wrong renderer. We wrote the wrong kind of AI. And then we shipped too early. The story was even bad. Like, it wasn't a bad story story. It was more like we moved into the future, which – we didn't realize at the time – undermined a lot of what made Deus Ex great."

=== Future games ===
Following the release of Invisible War, multiple attempts were made to create a third Deus Ex title, even after both Spector and Smith left Ion Storm. The two main projects were dubbed Deus Ex: Insurrection, which used the same engine as Invisible War while moving away from its divisive mechanics; and Deus Ex 3, which aimed to be an open world game with a branching narrative. Prospective development on the third Deus Ex game was halted when, following further staff departure and financial difficulties, the studio's owner Eidos Interactive closed them down in 2005. A separate project developed by Crystal Dynamics, intended as the fourth Deus Ex project following Insurrection and titled Deus Ex: Clan Wars, was reworked as Project Snowblind. Invisible War was the last Deus Ex game developed by Ion Storm prior to its closure.

In 2007, the next entry in the Deus Ex series at the newly-established Eidos Montréal with the aim of revitalizing the Deus Ex series, with the game being both a prequel and a reboot of the series. First announced shortly after beginning development, Deus Ex: Human Revolution was released in 2011 to critical and commercial success. A direct sequel to Human Revolution, Deus Ex: Mankind Divided, released in 2016. Mankind Divided and other projects following Human Revolution form part of a project dubbed the "Deus Ex Universe", with both games and additional media designed to expand upon the series setting.
