= Vertical slice =

Type of milestone, benchmark, or deadline in project management

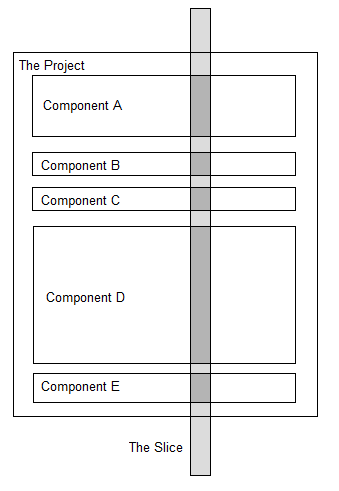
A vertical slice from the components of a project

A vertical slice (VS) is a type of milestone, benchmark, or deadline, with emphasis on demonstrating progress across all components of a project.

== Overview ==
The term vertical slice refers to a cross-sectional slice through the layers that form the structure of the software code base. It is mostly used in Scrum terminology where the work is planned in terms of features (or stories).

For example, a software project may consist of three layers (or components):

1. Data access layer (bottom)
2. Business logic layer (middle)
3. User interface layer (top)
